= List of metropolitans and patriarchs of Kyiv =

Metropolitan of Kyiv is an episcopal title that has been created with varying suffixes at multiple times in different Christian churches, though always maintaining the name of the metropolitan city — Kiev (Kyiv) — which today is located in the modern state of Ukraine. The church was canonically established and governed by the Ecumenical Patriarch of Constantinople in Kievan Rus'. Following the Council of Florence and the Union of Brest, there are now parallel apostolic successions: in the Russian Orthodox Church, the Orthodox Church of Ukraine, the Ruthenian Uniate Church and its successors. This list contains the names of all the metropolitan bishops (hierarchs) who have claimed the title. It is arranged chronologically and grouped per the claimed jurisdiction.

== Patriarchate of Constantinople (988-1441) ==
Metropolitan of Kyiv
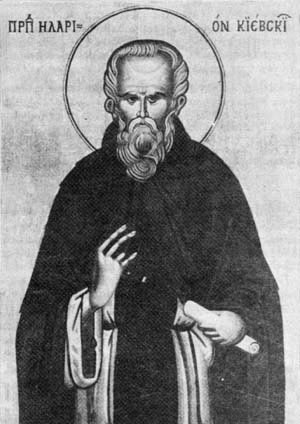
- Metropolitan Hilarion (1051–1054)
- Residence: Saint Sophia's Cathedral
- Seat: Kyiv, Ruthenia
- Appointer: Ecumenical Patriarch of Constantinople
- Formation: 988
- First holder: Michael I
- Final holder: Maximus
- Abolished: 1299
- Succession: Metropolitan of Kyiv and Moscow (Vladimir)

- "Michael I and Leontius", 988(?)–1004(?)
- Theophylact, 988–1018
- John, 1008(?)–1017(?)
- Teopempt 1037(?)–1043(?)
- "Cyril" (information about him appeared only no earlier than the 16th century)
- Hilarion 1051–(?)
- Ephraim, 1055(?)–(?)
- George, 1072(?)–(?)
- John II Prodrom, 1077(?)–1089
- John III, 1090–1091
- Nicholas, 1097–1101(?)
- Nikephoros, 1104–1121
- Nikita, 1122–1126
- Michael, 1130(?)–1145(?)
- Clement, 1147–1159
- Constantine, 1156–1159
- Theodore, 1161–1163
- John IV, 1164–1166
- Costantine II, 1167–1177(?)
- Michael II,
- "John V (?)–(?)"
- Nicephorus II, 1182(?)–1197(?)
- Matthew, 1210(?)–1220
- Cyril, 1224–1233
- Joseph I, 1237–(?)
- "Peter (Akerovich)", 1241–1246 (Archbishop of Ruthenia), never confirmed by the Patriarch
- Cyril II, 1250–1281
- Maximus, 1283–1299 Consecrated as metropolitan in 1283, Maximus moved the episcopal seat to Vladimir in 1299.
- Peter, 1308–1326 Metropolitan Peter moved the episcopal seat to Moscow in 1325.

=== Division of the Metropolis of Kiev and all Rus' ===
Metropolitan of Kyiv, Galicia and all Rus
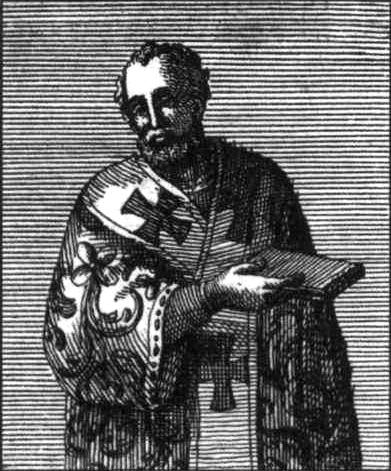
- Metropolitan Mykhailo
- Seat: Vilnius, Grand Duchy of Lithuania
- Appointer: Ecumenical Patriarch of Constantinople
- Precursor: Metropolitan of Halych (Lithuania); Metropolitan of Kyiv, Moscow and all Rus
- Formation: 1458
- First holder: Gregory
- Final holder: Michael
- Abolished: 1595
- Succession: Ruthenian Uniate Church; Metropolitan of Kyiv, Galicia and all Rus

In the 14th century, Emperor Andronikos II Palaiologos sanctioned the creation of two additional metropolitan sees: the Metropolis of Halych (1303) and the Metropolis of Lithuania (1317).

Metropolitan Roman (1355–1362) of Lithuania and Metropolitan Alexius of Kiev both claimed the see. Both metropolitans travelled to Constantinople to make their appeals in person. In 1356, their cases were heard by a Patriarchal Synod. The Holy Synod confirmed that Alexius was the Metropolitan of Kiev while Roman was also confirmed in his see at Novogorodek. In 1361, the two sees were formally divided. Shortly afterwards, in the winter of 1361/62, Roman died. From 1362 to 1371, the vacant see of Lithuania–Halych was administered by Alexius. By that point, the Lithuanian metropolis was effectively dissolved.

Metropolis of Kiev and all Rus' (See in Vladimir)	Metropolis of Halych (See in Halych)	Metropolis of Lithuania (See in Navahrudak)
Maximus (1285–1305)	Niphont (1303–1305)	Metropolis of Lithuania (See in Navahrudak)
Peter of Moscow (1308–1326)	sede vacante (1305–1326) (Administered by Peter of Moscow)	Theophilus 1317–1330

In 1325, the metropolitan seat was moved from the city of Vladimir to Moscow.

Metropolis of Kiev and all Rus' (See in Moscow)		Metropolis of Lithuania (See in Vilno)		Metropolis of Halych (See in Halych)	
1326–1328	vacant	1317–1330	Theophilus	1326–1329	Gabriel
1328–1353	Theognostus	1352	Teodorite	1337–1347	Theodore II
1354–1378	Alexius	1354–1362	Roman (united)		
1384–1385	Dionysius I	1376–1406	Cyprian	1370–1391	Antoniy
1382–1389	Pimen	1376–1406	Cyprian	1370–1391	Antoniy
1376–1406	Cyprian (united)				
1410–1431	Photius	1415–1419	Gregory		
1433–1435	Gerasimus (united)				
1436–1458	Isidore (united)				

Following the signing of the Council of Florence, Metropolitan Isidore of Kiev returned to Moscow in 1441 as a Ruthenian cardinal. He was arrested by the Grand Duke of Moscow and accused of apostasy. The Grand Duke deposed Isidore and in 1448 installed own candidate as Metropolitan of Kyiv — Jonah. This was carried out without the approval of Patriarch Gregory III of Constantinople. When Isidore died in 1458, he was succeeded as metropolitan in the Patriarchate of Constantinople by Gregory the Bulgarian. Gregory's canonical territory was the western part of the traditional Kievan Rus' lands — the states of the Grand Duchy of Lithuania and the Kingdom of Poland. The episcopal seat was in the city of Navahrudak which is today located in Belarus. It was later moved to Vilnius — the capital of the Grand Duchy of Lithuania. A parallel succession to the title ensued between Moscow and Vilnius. The Metropolitans of Kiev are the predecessors of the Patriarch of Moscow and all Rus' that was formed in the 16th century.

== In the Holy See ==
An Ecumenical council of the Church — the Council of Florence — took place from 1431 to 1449. Although he resisted at first, the Grand Prince of Moscow — Vasily II of Moscow — eventually permitted the Metropolitan of Kiev and all Rus' — Isidore of Kiev — to attend the council. Isidore, who was of Greek origin, submitted to the articles of the Bull of Union with the Greeks which united the Eastern Orthodox Church with the Holy See. The Great Prince of Moscow voided the union in his lands and imprisoned Isidore for some time. In September 1443, after two years of imprisonment, Metropolitan Isidor escaped to Tver, then to Lithuania and on to Rome. He was graciously received by the pope in 1443. Pope Nicholas V (1447–1455) sent him as legate to Constantinople to arrange the reunion there in 1452, and gave him two hundred soldiers to help the defence of the city.

- Gregory II, (1458–1473). His title to the metropolitan see was acknowledged both by the Holy See and by the Ecumenical Patriarchate of Constantinople.
- Misail Pstruch, 1476–1480 – his election was accepted by Casimir IV Jagiellon (King of Poland and Grand Duke of Lithuania), after he agreed to adhere to the Union of Florence. He was appointed by Pope Sixtus IV.
  - Spyridon Satana, 1476–1482 – consecrated as Orthodox metropolitan of Kyiv by Patriarch Raphael I of Constantinople but rejected by Casimir IV

== Patriarchate of Constantinople (1441–1596) ==
Following the Fall of Constantinople, the Union of Florence disintegrated. The patriarchy of Constantinople resumed the Eastern Orthodox succession with Simeon of Kiev. His tenure was challenged by the anti-Eastern Orthodox sentiments of the King of Poland Casimir IV Jagiellon and the 1482 plundering of Kiev by the Crimean Khan Mengli Giray, an ally of the Grand Prince Ivan III of Moscow.

- Simeon of Kiev, 1481–1488 – first accepted Orthodox metropolitan since 1458
- Jonah Hlezna, 1489–1494
- Macarius Chort, 1495–1497
- Joseph Bolharynovich, 1499–1501
- Jonah, metropolitan of Kyiv, 1503–1507
- Joseph Soltan, 1509–1522
- Joseph Rusin, 1523–1533
- Macarius Moskovytyanyn, 1534–1555
- Sylvester Bilkevich, 1556–1567
- Jonah Protasevich, 1568–1577
- Elias Kucha, 1577–1579
- Onesiphorus Devochka, 1579–1589
- Michael III, 1589–1599

In 1595, most Eastern Orthodox leaders in the Metropolis of Kiev and all Rus' signed the Union of Brest with the Holy See, thereby establishing the Ruthenian Uniate Church.

== In the Holy See (Union of Brest) ==
Following the failure of the Union of Florence, a second attempt at union was essayed in 1595/6. It resulted in the Union of Brest which re-established full communion with the Holy See. The effect was to create the Ruthenian Uniate Church. This is a list of Metropolitans of Kiev, Galicia and all Ruthenia in the Ruthenian Uniate Church before the partitions of Poland:

- 1596—1599 Michael III (Polish: Michał Rahoza, Belarusian: Міхаіл Рагоза)
- 1600—1613 Hypatius Pociej (Polish: Hipacy Pociej, Belarusian: Іпацій Пацей)
- 1613—1637 Joseph Rutski (Polish: Józef Welamin Rucki, Belarusian: Язэп Руцкі)
- 1637—1640 Raphael Korsak (Polish: Rafał Mikołaj Korsak, Belarusian: Рафаіл Корсак)
- 1641—1655 Antonius Sielawa (Polish: Antoni Sielawa, Belarusian: Антон Сялява)
- 1666—1674 Gabriel Kolenda (Polish: Gabriel Kolenda, Belarusian: Гаўрыла Календа)
- 1674—1693 Cyprian Żochowski (Polish: Cyprian Żochowski, Belarusian: Кіпрыян Жахоўскі)
- 1694—1708 Leo Załęski (Polish: Lew Ślubicz-Załęski, Ukrainian: Лев Слюбич-Заленський)
- 1708—1713 George Winnicki (Polish: Jerzy Winnicki, Ukrainian: Юрій Винницький)
- 1714—1729 Leo Kiszka (Polish: Leon Kiszka, Ukrainian: Лев Кишка)
- 1729—1746 Athanasius Szeptycki
- 1748—1762 Florian Hrebnicki
- 1762—1778 Philip Wołodkowicz
- 1778—1779 Leo Szeptycki
- 1780—1786 Jason Smogorzewski
- 1787—1805 Theodosius Rostocki

== Patriarchate of Constantinople (Exarchate of Ukraine) ==
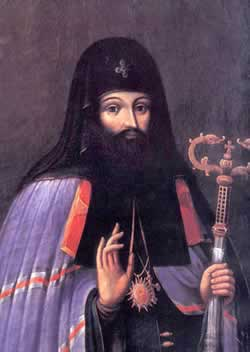
Petro Mohyla

Some clergy in the Commonwealth refused to subscribe to the Union of Brest and continued with the old rites and their allegiance to the Ecumenical Patriarch. More than 25 years of struggles within parishes for possession of church buildings and monasteries ensued. In 1620, the patriarch of Jerusalem — Theophanes III — entrenched the schism by establishing an "Exarchate of Ukraine" for those dissenting clergy and laity who refused to conform to the union. Parallel successions to the title of Metropolitan of Kiev, Galicia and all Rus' (Ruthenian: Митрополитъ Кієвскій, Гáлицкїй, й всеѧ` Рѡ´ссїи) continued until 1686. In that year, the Metropolis was transferred to the jurisdiction of the Patriarchate of Moscow, which then assumed the right to consecrate the Kievan metropolitans. (Note: King Sigismund III Vasa accused their consecrator, Theophanes III, Greek Orthodox Patriarch of Jerusalem, of being a covert agent working on behalf of the Ottoman Empire and ordered his arrest and the arrest of those consecrated by him.)

List of metropolitans of the "Exarchate of Ukraine":

- Job (1620–1631)
- Isaiah (1631–1633) (Note: The hierarchy which was consecrated in 1620 was legalized by the government in a 1632 agreement that permitted both the disuniate Greek Orthodox and uniate Greek Catholic jurisdictions within the Polish–Lithuanian Commonwealth.)
- Peter III (1633–1646) who was the first metropolitan to be recognized by the Crown of Poland
- Sylvester (1647–1657)
- Dionisius II (1657–1663) who transferred the episcopal seat from Kyiv to Chyhyryn due to Muscovite military incursions
- Joseph V, 1663–1675
  - Anton Vinnicky, (anti-Metropolitan) 1663–1679
- vacant 1679–1685

Appointed by Romanov civil authorities (residence in Kyiv):

- Locum Tenens Lazar Baranovych, 1659–1661
- Locum Tenens Methodius Filimonovich, 1661–1668
- Locum Tenens Lazar Baranovych, 1670–1685

== In the Patriarchate of Moscow ==
Metropolitan (Archbishop) of Kyiv, Galicia (and all Little Rus)
- Seat: Kyiv, Kiev Governorate (Cossack Hetmanate)
- Appointer: Patriarch of Moscow and all Russia
- Precursor: Metropolitan of Kyiv, Galicia and all Rus, Exarch of Ukraine
- Formation: 1685
- First holder: Gedeon
- Final holder: Anthony
- Abolished: 1919
- Succession: Metropolitan of Kyiv, Galicia, Exarch of Ukraine; Ukrainian Autocephalous Orthodox Church

=== Metropolitans of Kyiv, Galicia and of all Little Rus (1685–1770) ===
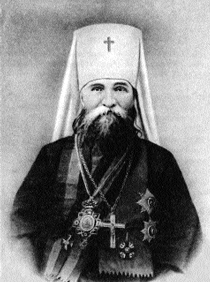
Metropolitan Vladimir

According to the Russian Orthodox Church, the ecclesiastical jurisdiction of the Greek Orthodox metropolis was transferred from the Ecumenical Patriarchate to the Moscow Patriarchate in 1686 thereby establishing the Metropolis of Kiev (Patriarchate of Moscow). This interpretation is disputed by the Orthodox Church of Ukraine (see 2018 Moscow–Constantinople schism).

- Gedeon Chetvertinsky, 1685–1690 (Former bishop of Lutsk, Gedeon Chetvertinsky was elected by the sobor initiated by the Hetman Ivan Samoilovych and later went for consecration to Moscow instead of Constantinople)
- Metropolitan Varlaam, 1690–1707
- Ioasaph, 1708–1718

In 1718 Peter the Great abolished metropolitan.

- Varlaam (Vanatovich), 1722–1730, archbishop
- Raphael, 1731–1747, metropolitan since 1743

In 1743 metropolitan was reinstated.

- Timothy, 1748–1757
- Arsenius, 1757–1770

In 1767 Catherine the Great stripped the Metropolitan Arsenius of title "of all Little Rus"

=== Metropolitans of Kyiv and Galicia (1770–1921) ===
In 1770, the Most Holy Synod stripped the metropolis of its suffragan sees. The title became an honorific with no practical sense of governing an ecclesiastical territory beyond its own geographic remit. This is a list of bishops who retained this empty title:

- Gabriel, 1770–1783
- Samuel, 1783–1796
- Hierotheus, 1796–1799
- Gabriel II, 1799–1803
- Serapion, 1803–1822
- Eugene, 1822–1837
- Philaret, 1837–1857
- Isidore, 1858–1860
- Arsenius II, 1860–1876
- Philotheus, 1876–1882
- Platon, 1882–1891
- Joanicius, 1891–1900
- Theognostus, 1900–1903
- Flavian, 1903–1915
- Vladimir, 1915–1918
  - Nicodemus, 1918 (as bishop of Chyhyryn)
- Anthony, 1918–1919 When Gen. Pyotr Wrangel′s White Army was defeated in South Russia in November 1920, Anthony emigrated. In 1921 he settled down in Sremski Karlovci, Serbia. Along with several other Russian bishops in exile, he established an independent Russian church administration that sought to embrace all Russian Orthodox diaspora, known as the Russian Orthodox Church Outside Russia (ROCOR).
  - Nazarius Blinov, 1919–1921

=== Metropolitans and Archbishops of Kyiv and Galicia (1921–present) ===
==== Bishops in communion with the Patriarchate of Moscow (1921–present) ====
Metropolitan of Kyiv and all Ukraine (Exarchate of Ukraine)
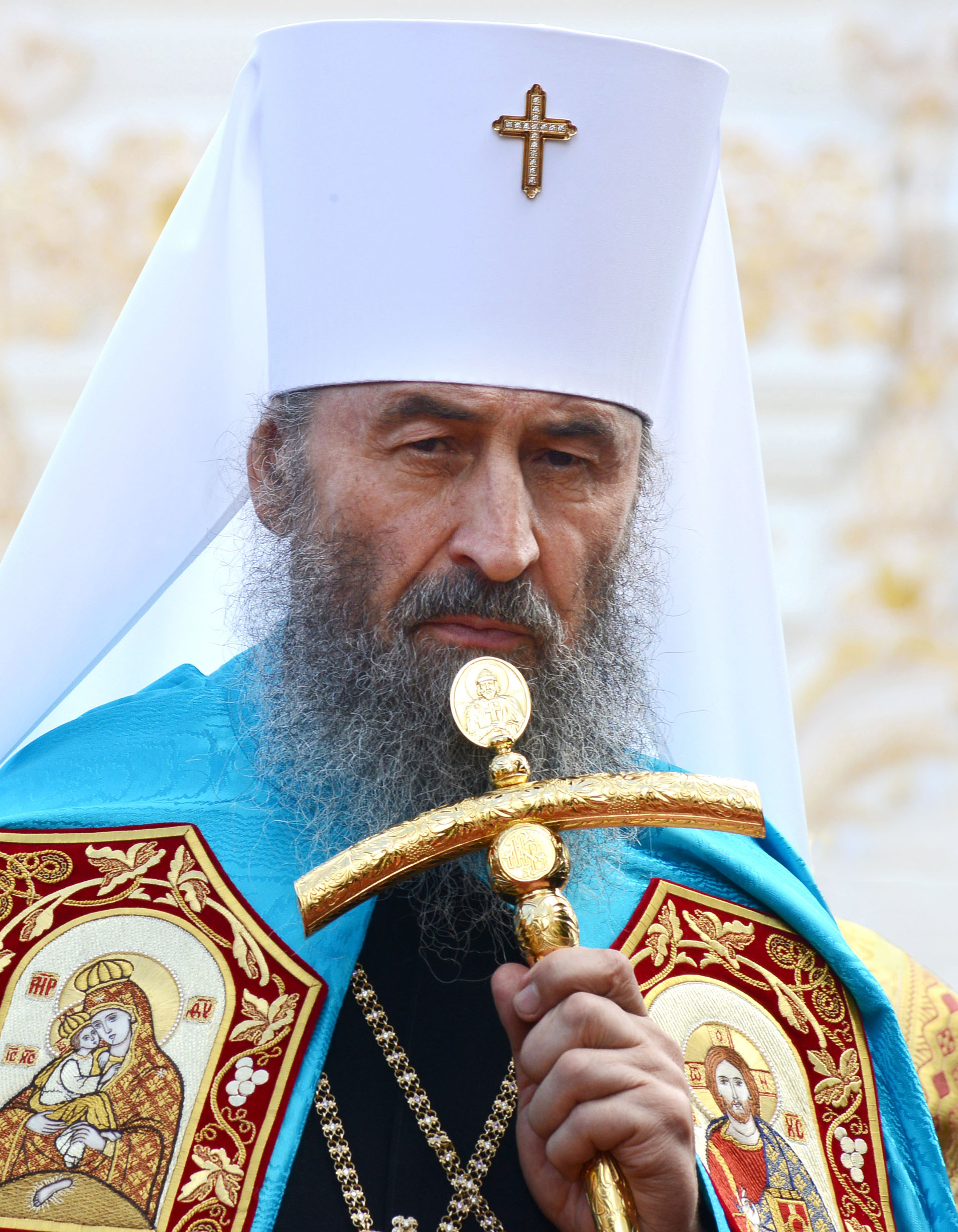
- Incumbent; Metropolitan Onuphrius since 2014
- Seat: Kyiv, Ukraine (formerly the Ukrainian SSR)
- Appointer: Patriarch of Moscow and all Rus'
- Precursor: Metropolitan of Kyiv, Galicia and all Rus, Exarch of Ukraine
- Formation: 1921
- First holder: Michael Yermakov

The Russian Orthodox Church erects exarchates which have a limited autonomy within a defined geographical territory (e.g. Belarusian Exarchate). Such an exarchate was erected for Kyiv in 1921. This is a list of exarchs of the Patriarchate of Moscow to date:

- Michael Yermakov, 1921–1925, bishop in 1921–27 exarch of Ukraine 1921–1929
- Georges Deliev, 1923–1928, bishop acting
- Macarius Karamzin, 1924, bishop acting
- Sergius Kuminsky, 1925–1930, bishop acting
- Demetrius Verbitsky, 1930–1932, archbishop
- Sergius Grishin, 1932–1934, archbishop
- Constantine Dyakov, 1934–1937, exarch of Ukraine 1929–1937
- Alexander, 1937–1938
- Nicholas Yarushevich, 1941–1944, exarch of Ukraine 1941
  - During World War II, the Ukrainian Soviet Socialist Republic was occupied by Nazi Germany. Exarch Nicholas moved to Moscow. The rest of bishops loyal to the Moscow Patriarchate created the Ukrainian Autonomous Orthodox Church (UAOC) which was recognized by Metropolitan Nicholas. When the German armies retreated from the SSR, the UAOC was dissolved; the exarchate was reinstated.
  - Oleksii Hromadskyi, 1941–1943 (Ukrainian Autonomous Orthodox Church)
  - Panteleimon Rudyk, 1943–1944 (Ukrainian Autonomous Orthodox Church)
- John Sokolov, 1944–1964, exarch of Ukraine
- Ioasaph II, 1964–1966, exarch of Ukraine
- Filaret II, 1966–1990, exarch of Ukraine

In 1990, the Russian Orthodox Church accorded a limited form of self rule to the Ukrainian Exarchate. The additional freedoms were not enumerated. The church is currently styled the "Ukrainian Orthodox Church (Moscow Patriarchate)" (UOC-MP). The metropolitan is styled "Metropolitan of Kyiv and all Ukraine". There have been three metropolitans of the UOC-MP to date:

- Filaret II (1990–1992) Following differences with the Patriarchate, he left and joined the newly formed Ukrainian Orthodox Church – Kyiv Patriarchate. In 1997, he was excommunicated by the Moscow Patriarchate.
- Volodymyr II Sabodan (1992–2014)
- Onufriy Berezovsky, 2014–incumbent

==== Bishops not in communion with the Patriarchate of Moscow (1923–present) ====
In 1923, a split occurred in the Patriarchate of Moscow. A majority (initially) of bishops associated themselves with a wing of the Church that was supported by the OGPU (the Soviet secret police). A minority, called "The Living Church", was spread across the territory of the USSR. Many episcopal sees in the 1920s and 1930s had 2 parallel bishops: one from the Living Church, another from the Moscow Patriarchate. The Living church had its headquarter in Kharkiv and was active in the Ukrainian Soviet Socialist Republic.

- Tikhon (Vasilevsky), 1923
- Nikolay (Fedotov), 1923–1924
- Aleksandr (Shcherbakov), 1924
- Innokentiy (Pustynsky), 1924–1929
- Iuvenaliy (Moshkovsky), 1928–1929
- Pimen (Pegov), 1929–1935
- Aleksandr (Chekanovsky), 1935–1937
- Vladimir (Zlobin), 1938–1941

===== Metropolitan of Kyiv and All Ukraine (self-consecrated) =====
- Vasyl Lypkivsky, 1921–1927
- Mykola Boretsky, 1927–1930
- Ivan Pavlovsky, 1930–1936

Due to Soviet pressure, the UAOC is liquidated in 1936, some of its members emigrated to the United States.

===== All-Ukrainian Orthodox Autocephalous Synodical Church =====
Created in 1923, the church was part of all-Soviet Renovation movement (Obnovlenichestvo). It was liquidated in 1935, but after the remaining communities were headed by acting primate.

- Pimen (Pegov), 1923-1935
- Oleksandr (Chekanovskyi), 1935-1937

===== Fraternal Parish Association of the Ukrainian Orthodox Autocephalous churches =====
In 1925 there was created another organization which opposed both the Living Church and Ukrainian Autocephalous Orthodox Church. After 1937 it disappeared.

- Feofil Buldovsky, 1925–1937

===== Polish Orthodox Church period (World War II) =====
Following the partition of Poland between Nazi Germany and Soviet Union, the Soviet Union annexed most of territory of the Polish Orthodox Church. Most of bishops were forced to switch to the Russian Orthodox Church except for very few. In 1942, UAOC was re-established with help of those few bishops left within the Polish Orthodox Church. Polikarp Sikorsky was appointed as temporary administrator of the Church by the primate of the Polish Orthodox Church, Dionizy (Waledyński).

- Polikarp Sikorsky, (Administrator of the Church under the title of Metropolitan of Lutsk and Kovel), 1942–1944

This relative freedom lasted till the return of the Red Army in 1944, after that the UAOC was again liquidated and remained structured only in the diaspora. In 1944 the Orthodox Metropolitan of Warsaw, Dionizy Waledynski, was appointed "Patriarch of All Ukraine", but the Soviet Union did not allow any operation in Ukraine.

== Ukrainian Orthodox Church – Orthodox Church of Ukraine ==
=== Patriarchs of Kyiv and all Rus-Ukraine (Kyiv Patriarchate) ===
Patriarch Mstyslav (Stepan Ivanovych Skrypnyk) was the Patriarch of Kyiv and all Rus' and the primate of the Ukrainian Autocephalous Orthodox Church (UAOC) and the Ukrainian Orthodox Church (Kyiv Patriarchate) (UOC–KP) from 1991 to 1993. After Mstyslav's death in 1993, the temporary union ended; the Ukrainian Orthodox Church – Kyiv Patriarchate and the Ukrainian Autocephalous Orthodox Church separated. After being dismissed in 1992 by the Archhierarch Synod of the Ukrainian Orthodox Church, the Ukrainian Metropolitan Filaret joined the UOC–KP under Patriarch Mstyslav. Patriarch Mstyslav did not recognize the union. The primates of the Ukrainian Orthodox Church–Kyiv Patriarchate continue to style themselves as patriarch:

- Volodymyr (1993–1995)
- Filaret II Denysenko (1995–2018; 2019–2026) (see Conflict between Filaret and Epiphanius)

=== Metropolitans and Patriarch of Kyiv and All Ukraine (Ukrainian Autocephalous Orthodox Church) ===
In 1989 the Ukrainian Autocephalous Orthodox Church was legally registered in the Ukrainian SSR. This was made possible by the President Gorbachev's policies of Perestroyka. Previously, only the Russian Orthodox Church in Moscow was allowed to function in Ukraine. It was not in communion with the Patriarchate of Moscow. It was disestablished in 2018. It had four metropolitans during that time:

- Mstyslav (1991–1993) as Patriarch of Kyiv and all Ukraine
- Dymytriy (1993–2000) as Patriarch of Kyiv and all Ukraine
- Mefodiy Kudriakov (2000–2015)
- Makariy Maletych (2015–2018)

On 15 December 2018, the UAOC along with the UOC–KP merged into the unified Orthodox Church of Ukraine.

=== One church ===
Metropolitan of Kyiv and all Ukraine
- Митрополит Київський і всієї України
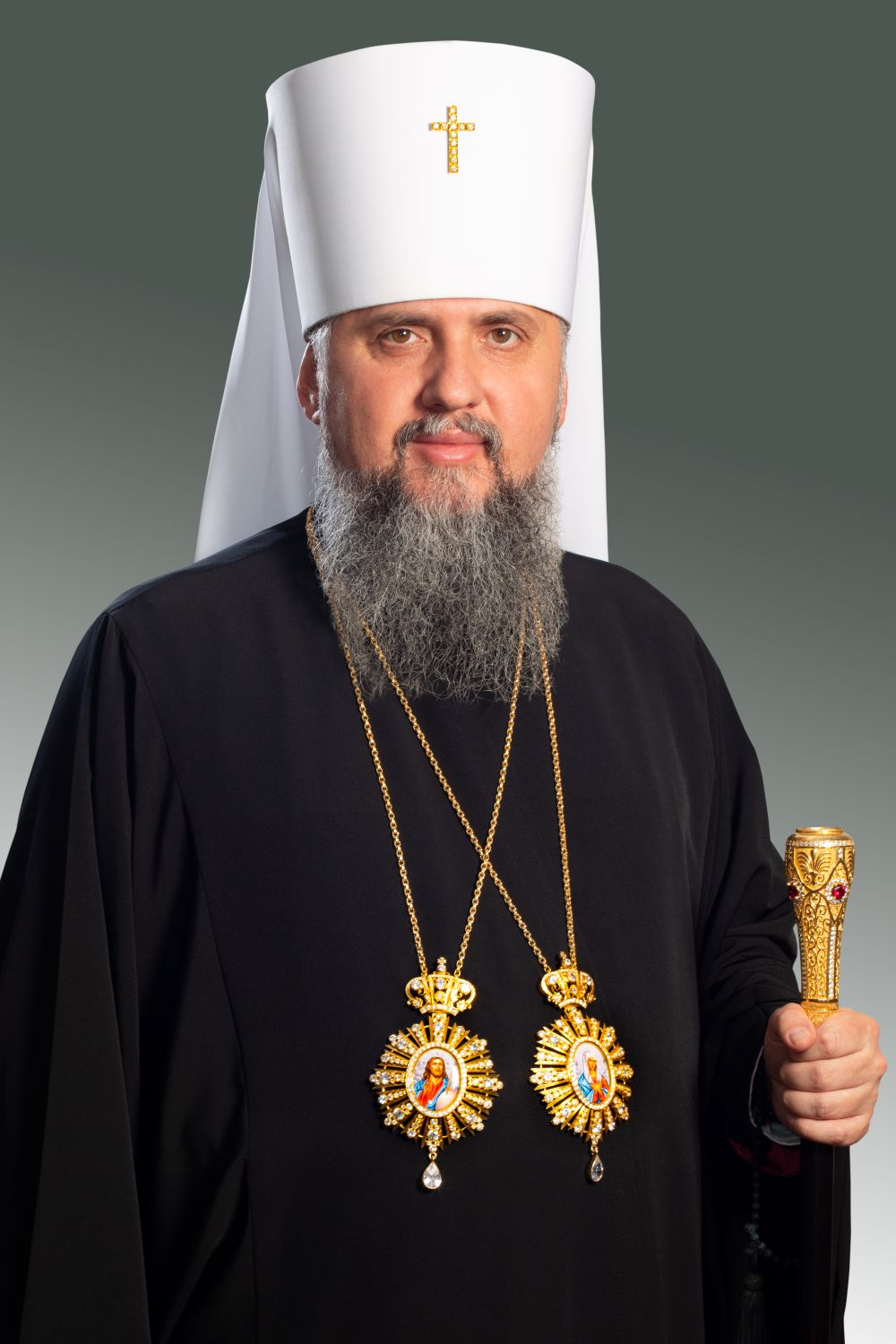
- Incumbent; Epiphanius of Kyiv since 2018
- Seat: Kyiv, Ukraine
- Formation: 2018
- First holder: Epiphanius of Kyiv

The Orthodox Church of Ukraine (OCU) was established by a unification council on 15 December 2018. The council voted to unite the existing Ukrainian Orthodox churches (UOC-KP, UAOC and parts of the UOC-MP) through their representatives, on the basis of complete canonical independence. The primate of the Church is styled the "Metropolitan of Kyiv and all Ukraine". The unification council elected Epiphanius (Dumenko) as its first primate. The Church was officially granted autocephaly on 5 January 2019 by decree of the Ecumenical Patriarch, Bartholomew I.

In June 2019, however, Filaret and a few clergymen declared a split from the UOC, in a dispute over the leadership of the Church.

As of December 2019, the OCU is recognized by the Ecumenical Patriarchate of Constantinople, the Patriarchate of Alexandria, the Church of Greece, and the Church of Cyprus.

This is a list of Metropolitans of Kyiv and all Ukraine:

- Epiphanius of Kyiv (2018–present)

== See also ==
- Bishop of Kyiv (disambiguation)
- Roman Catholic Diocese of Kyiv-Zhytomyr
