= Metropolis of Lithuania =

1315–1371 metropolis of the Eastern Orthodox Church

The Metropolis of Lithuania was a metropolis of the Ecumenical Patriarchate of Constantinople in the Eastern Orthodox Church. It was erected on the territory of the Grand Duchy of Lithuania between 1315 and 1317. It was disestablished in 1371. The seat (cathedra) of the metropolis was initially in Navahrudak. It had only two metropolitan bishops. The establishment took place in the aftermath of the Mongol invasion of Kievan Rus' which was exploited by the rulers of Lithuania to greatly expand their territory. To help legitimize their annexations and to bind their new subjects more closely to the state, the royal powers favoured the erection of a metropolis for the inhabitants of the Grand Principality. To avert the possibility of the state going over to the Holy See, the hierarchs based in Moscow latterly supported the erection of the metropolis as the lesser of two evils. Throughout the existence of the metropolis, the metropolitans struggled for religious control of the Rus' eparchies with the secular and religious powers in the Kingdom of Galicia–Volhynia, the Principality of Tver, and the Grand Duchy of Moscow.

== Background ==
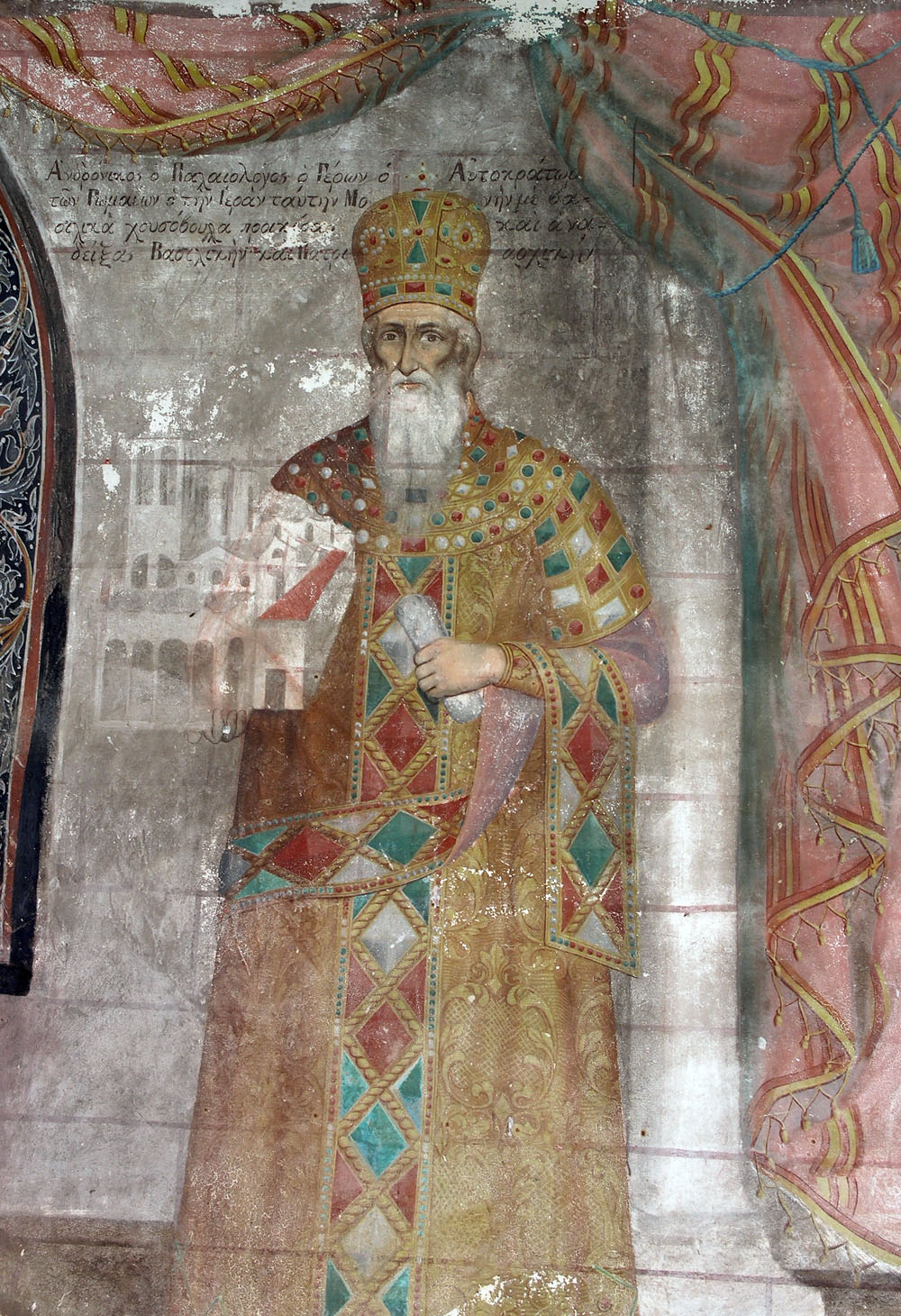
Fresco of Emperor Andronikos II Palaiologos, who established the Metropolis

Having escaped the brunt of the Mongol invasions, the Grand Duchy of Lithuania expanded into neighbouring areas that had been weakened by internal strife and by the Mongol predations. While these expansions were usually at the expense of slavic principalities of the former Kievan Rus', sometimes they were voluntary. For example, the dukes of the Principality of Turov began to cooperate more and more with the Grand Duchy and by the early 14th century the Principality non-violently joined the Grand Duchy. In 1320, most of the principalities of western Rus' were either made into vassals or were directly annexed by Lithuania. In 1321, Gediminas captured Kiev, sending Stanislav, the last Rurikid to rule Kiev, into exile. Gediminas also re-established the permanent capital of the Grand Duchy in Vilnius, presumably moving it from Old Trakai in 1323. The state continued to expand its territory under the reign of Grand Duke Algirdas and his brother Kęstutis, who both ruled the state in harmony.

At the time, religious allegiance played an important role in politics. While adhering to the pagan faith, Grand Dukes Vytenis and Gediminas understood the political importance of controlling the Church. Furthermore, the Metropolitan of Kiev and all Rus' — Peter of Moscow — moved the seat of the metropolis to Moscow. The lack of a metropolitan bishop for the inhabitants of the Grand Duchy impeded the development of the idea of a single Lithuanian state that was being advanced by the ruling family. At the same time, the religious leaders in Rus' realised that the lack of a separate metropolis would leave the Lithuanian state susceptible to the influence of the Latin Church. In attempting to preserve the continued cultural and religious unity of Rus', the Orthodox leaders realised that they might ultimately drive the people into the arms of Rome. By the mid-1350's, the senior clergy of the Rus' in Lithuania were agreed that a separate Lithuanian metropolis was the lesser of two evils. The question was raised in their letters to patriarchate in Constantinople between 1328 and 1347. Consequently, the Grand Dukes of Lithuania requested the Patriarch to establish a separate diocese that was independent from Moscow.

The Patriarch of Constantinople generally preferred a united Metropolis of Kiev and all Rus' and was reluctant to divide its authority. Therefore, whenever possible, the patriarchs would unite the metropoles in the former territory of Kievan Rus'. By the 1440s however, just before the Fall of Constantinople, the Grand Duchy of Moscow had effectively won the dispute and became the new spiritual center of the Orthodox tradition in Eastern Europe.

== Metropolitan Theophilus (1317–1329) ==
Emperor Andronikos II Palaiologos established the metropolis while Patriarch John XIII of Constantinople ordained the prelate - Theophilus — who was of Rus' origin. A surviving list of his property shows that Theophilus traveled extensively around the Rus' principalities and presented expensive gifts to prominent rulers of the region, perhaps as part of a campaign to become the Metropolitan of Kiev.

The episcopal see of the metropolis was in Navahrudak. It had two suffragan dioceses in Turov and Polatsk.

From 1303 to 1347, a new metropolis also existed on the southern borders of the Lithuanian lands - the Metropolis of Halych. There were long periods of time when this metropolitan seat lay vacant.

From 1317 to 1329 Grand Duke Gediminas flirted with Roman Catholicism and wrote to Pope John XXII. The pope replied in 1324 and an active attempt to bring Lithuania into the Latin camp was made. Envoys were dispatched to Vilnius, but when they arrived the situation had changed. Gediminas claimed that he had never said in his letters that he was ready to be baptized and that his scribes, the Franciscan brothers Henry and Berthold apparently had written things which he had never told them. The papal legates reported to the pope that the magnates of Samogitia made threats against the life of the Grand Duke and his family and that there were also external Russian threats should he accept the Roman rite:

"It is for this that the king renounced the faith to the point that he no longer dared to utter a word about baptism."

Following the death of Peter of Moscow in 1326, Theophilus and a candidate presented by Moscow were rejected by Constantinople as too political for the Metropolis of Kiev. Instead, the patriarch appointed an independent person -Theognostus - as the new Metropolitan.

== Sede vacante (1329–1355) ==
When Theophilus died in 1329, Theognostus succeeded in restoring unity in the Rus' by claiming that there were too few Christians in pagan Lithuania. The seat of the metropolis was left vacant. In the meantime, Theognostus had authority over all Rus' and Lithuania until his own death in 1353. For two years, the see was again vacant.

== Metropolitan Roman (1355–1362) ==
Following a civil war, Algirdas was acknowledged as the new Grand Duke of Lithuania. Having increased the territorial extent of the state in the south, he was in a stronger position to advocate for the restoration of metropolis. In 1360, he deposed Theodore who was the last ethnic Rus' prince of Kiev. In his place, he placed his own son, Vladimir, on the throne.

After the death of Theognostus in 1353, Algirdas did not at first attempt to revive the Metropolitanate of Lithuania. Instead, he promoted his own candidate - Teodoryt - to the see of Kiev and All Rus'. When Teodoryt failed to gain support in the Ecumenical Patriarchate, he turned to the schismatic Bulgarian Orthodox Church and received ordination there. Such actions may indicate that Algirdas envisioned an autocephalous church of his own. In any case, Theognostus' favoured candidate — Alexius — was consecrated as Metropolitan of Kiev and All Rus' in 1354.

Algirdas now changed his support from Teodoryt to Roman. Roman was a monk from Tver and a relative of Algirdas' wife Uliana. Algirdas agreed to cease his support for Teodoryt on the grounds that his ordination was uncanonical, on condition that Roman was also appointed as Metropolitan of All Rus'. Algirdas even promised to convert to Orthodoxy in exchange for the ordination of Roman. In Constantinople, Patriarch Callistus I was deposed and was succeeded by Patriarch Philotheus I of Constantinople (November 1353 – 1354).

In 1355, after diplomatic struggles, a restored Patriarch Callistus I of Constantinople, in agreement with Philotheus, united the Metropolis of Halych with the Metropolis of Lithuania under the leadership of Metropolitan Roman. Callistus also confirmed that Alexius remained in possession of the "Metropolis of Kiev and all Rus'". All eparchies of the Halych metropolis were transferred to the jurisdiction of a united metropolis, which was also known as the "Metropolis of Lithuania-Volhynia".

There were now two metropolitans in Rus' lands. While Roman won over some bishops, he failed to secure the support of the Bishop of Tver. The ecclesiastical authorities of Constantinople did not take any measures to delineate the powers of the two metropolitans; neither did they assign any particular diocese of the old Rus' metropolis to the new metropolis of Lithuania-Volhynia. As a result, Roman began to claim that he ruled not only the dioceses of Lithuania-Volhynia, but also those of the entire Rus' metropolis. The ensuing struggle between the two metropolitans continued until Roman's death in 1362.

Both Metropolitans travelled to Constantinople to make their appeals in person. In 1356, their cases were heard by a Patriarchal Synod. The Holy Synod confirmed that Alexis was the Metropolitan of Kiev while Roman was also confirmed in his see at Novogorodek. In 1361, the two sees were formally divided. Shortly afterwards, in the winter of 1361/62, Roman died. From 1362 to 1371, the vacant see of Lithuania–Halych was administered by Alexius. By that point, the Lithuanian metropolis was effectively dissolved.

== Disestablishment of the metropolis ==
Following the disestablishment of Roman’s see, the territory of Lithuania was officially lowered to the rank of a bishopric. It was placed under the jurisdiction of the Metropolitan of Kiev and all Rus'. While the senior clergy of the Orthodox Church in Moscow asserted that the territory of the Grand Duchy was within their canonical scope, they made little attempt to evangelise the territory. No Orthodox missionaries were sent to work among the Lithuanians. The common folk were unwilling to embrace Christianity. Given the support of paganism among the nobility, the royal family was unwilling to alienate them by granting approval for Orthodox missionaries to operate in the state. In any case, following the predations of the Mongol invasion, large parts of the countryside were underpopulated and Kiev itself was uninhabitable for a considerable period of time. This explains why the metropolitan see moved to Vladimir. Monks and other clergy also moved to the north to escape the intrusions of the Mongol overlords. No notable monastery was located in lands controlled by the Lithuanians.

Algirdas interpreted the dissolution as an insult to himself and to the Lithuanian state. In 1371, he again attempted to erect a separate Lithuanian metropolis. He wrote to the Patriarch strongly condemning Alexius of neglecting his flock in Lithuanian areas. He also accused Alexius of being more interested in politics than in religion:

"Such metropolitans we did not have in the days of our forefathers. He blesses the Muscovites to slaughter, but never comes to us. And to Kiev he does not come . . .the metropolitan should bless the Muscovites that they help us as we are fighting for them against the Germans. We invite him, but he never comes. Give us another metropolitan for Kiev, Smolensk, Tver, Little Russia, Novoselsk, and Nizhni Novgorod."

Constantinople replied with an ironic reference to Algirdas' being the king of "fire-worshippers" (i.e. still a pagan). Nevertheless, the point was carried, and Algirdas' intervention was successful in raising his own candidate — Cyprian — to the throne.

== Temporary metropolis ==
On 2 December 1375, at the Holy Council in Constantinople, Philotheus, who had been restored to the patriarchy, ordained Cyprian as "Metropolitan of Kiev, Rus' and Lithuania", but with the condition that after the death of the elderly Metropolitan Alexius, he would become the metropolitan of Kiev and all Rus' and unite the entire metropolis under his authority.

On 12 February 1376, Alexius died; by the terms of the agreement with the patriarch, Cyprian was entitled to rule the religious affairs of all Rus'. On 6 June 1376, Cyprian arrived at his residence in Kiev. He attempted, but failed, to get recognition of his rights in the whole metropolitan diocese from the Grand Duke of Moscow Dmitri Donskoi, Novgorod, and Pskov. However, in the same year, there was a palace mutiny in Constantinople in which power was usurped by Andronikos IV. The new emperor deposed Patriarch Philotheus and installed Macarius in his stead. Macarius assured Dmitriy of Moscow in writing that he denied Cyprian's claims to the Church of Great Rus. He also offered to send the Grand Duke's nominee — Mitya — to Constantinople for his consecration as metropolitan. Mitya, however, died (1379) within sight of Constantinople. Mitya was accompanied by Pimen. The succeeding Patriarch — Nilus — may have been tricked by Pimen using forged letters into consecrating Pimen in Mitya's place in June 1380.

As a result, Cyprian's rights to the united metropolis was disputed by Pimen (1380–1382). Dmitry, upon hearing the news of Pimen's consecration, angrily swore not to accept Pimen upon his return. Thus Pimen's metropolitanate was contested from the start, and he accomplished little as a result. Cyprian's rights were also disputed by Dionysius (1384–1385). Dionysius died in detention in Kiev on 15 October 15, 1385. After this, Cyprian enjoyed undisputed leadership of the Church throughout the Rus' and Lithuanian lands. He died in 1406.

== See also ==
- Exarchate of the Ecumenical Patriarchate in Lithuania

== Sources ==
- Majeska, George P. (1984). Russian Travelers to Constantinople in the Fourteenth and Fifteenth Centuries. Dumbarton Oaks. ISBN 0-88402-101-7.
- Meyendorff, John (1989). Byzantium and the Rise of Russia: a Study of Byzantino-Russian Relations in the Fourteenth Century. St Vladimir's Seminary Press. ISBN 0-88141-079-9.
- Rowell, S. C. (1994). Lithuania Ascending: A Pagan Empire Within East-Central Europe, 1295–1345. Cambridge Studies in Medieval Life and Thought: Fourth Series. Cambridge University Press. ISBN 978-0-521-45011-9.
- Lithuanian metropoly at the Encyclopedia of Ukraine
