= Pimen, Metropolitan of Kiev =

- Metropolitan of Kiev and All Rus
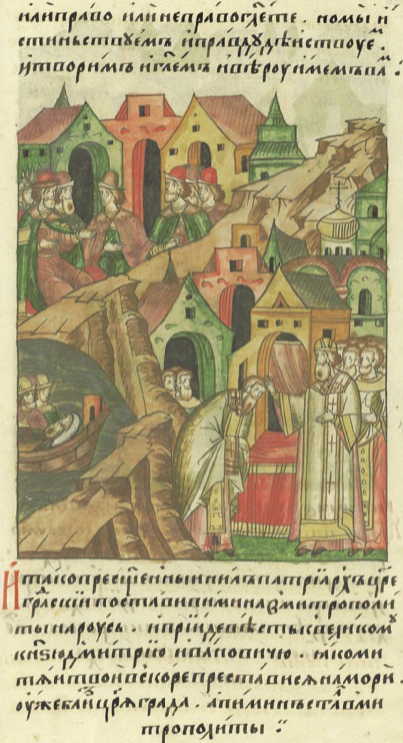
- Patriarch Nil consecrates Pimen as Metropolitan of Kiev
- Church: Russian Orthodox Church
- See: Moscow
- Installed: 1382
- Term ended: 1384
- Predecessor: Cyprian, Metropolitan of Kiev
- Successor: Dionysius, Metropolitan of Kiev

Personal details
- Born: c. 1304
- Died: 11 September 1389

Pimen (Russian: Пимен, Pimen; known as Pimen the Greek, Russian: Пимен Грек, Pimen Grek) was the Metropolitan of Kiev and all Rus' from June 1380 until he was deposed in 1384. At the same time, Cyprian, Metropolitan of Kiev was alive and claimed the same title.

== Biography ==
Pimen was the hegumen of the Goritskii Monastery in Pereiaslavl-Zalesskii. In 1379, the Grand Prince of Moscow, Dmitry sent him to Constantinople with his nominee for the metropolitanate, the Archimandrite Mitya, where the latter was to be consecrated by the Ecumenical Patriarch. Mitya, sometimes referred to as Mikhail, was a secular (non-monastic) priest and Namestnik (vicar) of the late Metropolitan Alexius of Kiev (in office: 1354 to 1378) as well as the Pechatnik ( carrier of the seal) of the Grand Prince. Mitya, however, died (1379) within sight of Constantinople and was buried at Galata (a Genoese possession north of the Golden Horn). Patriarch Nilus of Constantinople consecrated Pimen in Mitya's place in June 1380. This was done without the knowledge of the Grand Prince and the Patriarch was said to have been tricked (perhaps to exonerate him later for any complicity he may have had in the deception), as Pimen had apparently used forged grand-princely letters to get Patriarch Nilus to consecrate him. Dmitry, upon hearing the news of Pimen's consecration, angrily swore not to accept Pimen upon his return. Thus Pimen's metropolitanate was contested from the start, and he accomplished little as a result.

Cyprian had been the rightful metropolitan – he had been named Metropolitan of Lithuania and Western Rus' and was to succeed to the Metropolitanate of Kiev and All Rus' upon the death of Metropolitan Alexius. On 12 February 1378, Alexius died. However, the Grand Prince only accepted Cyprian in March 1381 because of his anger at Pimen's consecration. In fact, the Grand Prince sent his confessor, Hegumen Fedor of the Simonovskii Monastery, to Kiev to bring Cyprian to Moscow (he arrived in May of that year). When Pimen arrived back in Russia, the Grand Prince had him arrested and sent to Chukhloma in the Kostroma district. Upon hearing this news, Patriarch Nilus excommunicated Dmitry Donskoy and imposed an interdict, whereupon Dmitry deposed Cyprian, whom he blamed for the matter. Cyprian was banished from Moscow in October 1382 and Pimen allowed to come to Moscow and take up his duties as metropolitan; Dmitry wanted to avoid excommunication and interdiction – his personal feelings, however, had not changed.

Pimen was himself deposed in 1384; the Grand Prince, still angry at the illegitimate nature of Pimen's election, filed charges and sent Pimen to the Patriarch in June 1384 to answer the charges. Nilus, claiming ignorance of Pimen's conspiracy to become metropolitan, ordered two metropolitans be sent to Moscow to investigate. Dionysius of Suzdal, who had opposed Pimen in 1382 (he himself had hoped to be named metropolitan), was sent as well, but traveled instead to Kiev, when he tried to negotiate with Cyprian, the rightful metropolitan. While Pimen was deposed that winter and Dionysius apparently was to be consecrated in his place, in fact, Dionysius was arrested in Kiev at Cyprian's instigation and died in confinement there in October 1385. In May 1385, Pimen went to Constantinople to plead his case, but Cyprian arrived there shortly thereafter to argue his case for recognition as the metropolitan. The Patriarch convened a council to decide the matter, but procrastinated for three years, leading Dmitry Donskoy to finally dismiss the Greek metropolitans in Moscow and to send his confessor, Fedor, to plead for Pimen's removal. Pimen had returned to Moscow in 1388, but was never reinstated and left again for the Byzantine Empire in April 1389 to appeal, yet again, to the Patriarch of Constantinople; he remained in Chalcedon, where he died on 11 September 1389 and was buried in the Church of John the Forerunner. Dmitry Donskoy had died the previous May, and his son, Grand Duke Vasilii, finally accepted Cyprian as metropolitan in Moscow.

Eastern Orthodox Church titles
| Preceded by Cyprian | Metropolitan of Moscow; 1382–1384 | Succeeded by Dionysius I |
