= Metropolis of Halych =

1303–1458 metropolis of the Eastern Orthodox Church

The Metropolis of Halych was a metropolis of the Ecumenical Patriarchate of Constantinople in the Eastern Orthodox Church. It was erected on the territory of the Kingdom of Galicia–Volhynia in 1303 by Patriarch Athanasius I of Constantinople. The episcopal seat of the metropolis was in the city of Halych in the Cathedral of the Dormition.

== Historical background ==
In 1241, the Kingdom of Galicia-Volhynia was captured by the Mongol army. In 1245, King Daniel of Galicia won a decisive battle over the Hungarian-Polish army of his opponent Rostislav Mikhailovich and united Halychia with Volhynia. After this victory, he built his residence in Kholm in the western part of Volhynia. After Daniel's visit to Batu Khan, he made payments of tribute to the Golden Horde.

In 1299, the Metropolitan of Kiev and All Rus' — Maximus — transferred the metropolitan seat from Kiev to the city of Vladimir-on-Klyazma. In reaction to this move, King Daniel's son and successor on the throne — Leo I — petitioned the Ecumenical Patriarch to erect a new metropolis in the territory of his kingdom. Leo died in 1301 but his son — Yuri I of Galicia — succeeded in securing the charter of establishment from Patriarch Athanasius I of Constantinople with the approval of Emperor Andronikos II Palaiologos.

== Eparchies ==
There were five suffragan sees (eparchies) in the metropolis that were mostly located in the region of Volhynia: Volodymyr of Volhynia, Lutsk, Peremysl, Turiv, Kholm.

== Metropolitan Niphont (1303–1305) ==
Little is known about the first metropolitan — Niphont (1303–1305). Following his death, the see lay vacant for three years. During that time, there were civil struggles with neighbouring realms. In 1308 Yuri Lvovych nominated Peter of Moscow as Metropolitan of Kiev and all Rus'. In the absence of a hierarch in Halych, Peter was effectively the administrator of that metropolis as well as his own metropolis of Kiev. In 1325, Peter moved his metropolitan seat 200 kilometers (120 mi) to the west from Vladimir to Moscow.

== Metropolitan Gabriel (1326–1329) ==
Following the death of Peter in 1326, the see of Halych was filled by Gabriel. Two years later, Theognostus of Kiev (reigned 1328–1353) was consecrated as the Metropolitan of Kiev and all Rus'. Theognostus and the Grand Dukes of Moscow wanted to get rid of a rival metropolis in Rus' lands. After Gabriel's death in 1329, the metropolis entered a period of crisis. The see again lay vacant until 1337.

== Metropolitan Theodore (1337–1347) ==
In 1337, Patriarch John XIV of Constantinople approved the appointment of a new Metropolitan of Halych — Theodore. Little is known about his career. Following his death in 1347, the Grand Prince of Moscow — Simeon — conspired with Theognostus of Kiev to convince Emperor John VI Kantakouzenos to disestablish the Halych metropolis. At that time, the Kingdom of Galicia–Volhynia was convulsed by the Galicia–Volhynia Wars which resulted in the kingdom being sundered between the Grand Duchy of Lithuania and the Kingdom of Poland.

== Erection of the Metropolis of Lithuania-Volhynia ==
Theognostus of Kiev died in 1353. He was succeeded in the Metropolis of Kiev and all Rus' by Alexius (reigned 1354–1378). In 1355, after diplomatic struggles, a restored Patriarch Callistus I of Constantinople, in agreement with Philotheus, united the Metropolis of Halych with the Metropolis of Lithuania under the leadership of Metropolitan Roman. Callistus also confirmed that Alexius remained in possession of the "Metropolis of Kiev and all Rus'". All eparchies of the Halych metropolis were transferred to the jurisdiction of a united metropolis, which was also known as the "Metropolis of Lithuania-Volhynia". The rivalry between Roman and Alexius continued until Roman's death in 1362. From 1362 to 1371, the vacant see of Lithuania–Halych was administered by Alexius.

== Disestablishment of the Metropolis of Lithuania–Volhynia ==
In 1370 or 1371, the united metropolis was disestablished by Patriarch Philotheus I of Constantinople. The territory of the former metropolis was reunited to the Metropolis of Kiev under Alexius. The territory of the former metropolises of Halych and of Lithuania were officially lowered to the rank of bishoprics within the Kiev metropolis. These changes, however, did not end the political rivalry for religious influence in Rus'.

=== Re-establishment of the Metropolis of Halych ===
Just before his death, King Casimir III the Great of Poland revived the Halych metropolis for a short period. Casimir cited the precedent of the existence of a metropolis created by Athanasios I. He convinced Philotheus I, who served as Patriarch of Constantinople for the second time, to consecrate Antoniy as Metropolitan of Halych. In May 1371, he wrote to Alexius informing him that he had separated the Halych (Galician), Kholm, Turov, Peremyshl, and Vladimir-Volhynia dioceses from the Kiev metropolis for the third time. He proclaimed one of the bishops of these dioceses — Anthony — as Metropolitan of Halych. Antoniy only exercised control over the three eparchies that were within the territory of the expanded Polish realm. Following the death of Antoniy in 1391, King Władysław II Jagiełło tried to have Ivan, the Bishop of Lutsk, consecrated as Antoniy's successor. Ivan failed to receive the approval of the patriarch. The revived metropolis was again extinguished, never to rise again.

=== Disputes in Lithuania ===
The Grand Duke of Lithuania — Algirdas — attacked Muscovy on three occasions between 1368 and 1372 as part of the Lithuanian–Muscovite War. This was in support of his ally, Mikhail II, Prince of Tver. It may also have been motivated by a desire to advance his calls for a separate metropolis for the Grand Duchy that was independent of Moscow. Cyprian was sent by the Patriarch as a trustee (envoy) to the Rus' princes in the Lithuanian and Muscovite lands with the goal to reconcile the Lithuanian and Tverite princes with Metropolitan Alexius and to prevent the total division of the Church between Wilno and Moscow. Cyprian went to Constantinople from the Grand Duchy of Lithuania carrying a letter from the leading Ruthenian Eastern Orthodox clergy requesting the patriarch to consecrate him as the Metropolitan of Lithuania.

Hostilities between Moscow and Lithuania resumed; in August 1375 Muscovite troops captured Tver. Patriarch Philotheus I was aware of the threat of Catholization of the population of the Grand Duchy of Lithuania. He therefore agreed to grant the petition of the previous Grand Duke — Algirdas — to create a separate metropolis in the territory of the Grand Duchy. Philotheus also listened to the petitions of the Eastern Orthodox princes to have Cyprian as their metropolitan. On 2 December 1375 at the Council of Constantinople, Philotheus consecrated Cyprian as "Metropolitan of Kiev, Rus' and Lithuania", under a condition that "upon the death of Alexius, Cyprian should become the Metropolitan of Kiev and all Rus".

In 1414, Grand Duke Vytautas attempted to re-establish the Metropolis of Lithuania. He arranged for a synod of bishops to elect Gregory Tsamblak as the Metropolitan of Lithuania. The consecration took place without the consent of Patriarch Euthymius II of Constantinople and was not recognized in Moscow. The rivalry effectively ended in 1448 when Moscow began selecting the metropolitans independently without approval from the Ecumenical Patriarchate, which collapsed in 1453.

In 1458 two metropolises of Kiev and all Rus' and Halych were merged by the Patriarch of Constantinople into one, the Metropolis of Kiev, Halych and all Rus'.

== List of metropolitans ==
- 1303–1305 Niphont
- 1305–1326 sede vacante. The metropolis was effectively administered by Peter of Moscow (as Metropolitan of Kiev and all Rus')
- 1326–1329 Gabriel
- 1329–1337 sede vacante. The metropolis was effectively administered by Theognostus of Kiev (as Metropolitan of Kiev and all Rus')
- 1337–1347 Teodore

Disestablishment of the Metropolis of Halych
- 1347–1353 The territory of the former metropolis was again administered by Theognostus of Kiev (as Metropolitan of Kiev and all Rus')
- 1353–1356 The territory of the former metropolis was administered by Alexius (as Metropolitan of Kiev and all Rus')

Establishment of the Metropolis of Lithuania-Volhynia
- 1356–1362 Transfer of all former Halych eparchies to a newly erected "Metropolis of Lithuania-Volhynia" under Metropolitan Roman

Disestablishment of the Metropolis of Lithuania-Volhynia
- 1362–1370 sede vacante. The territory of the former metropolis was again effectively administered by Alexius

Establishment of the Metropolis of Halych (of the second creation)
- 1370–1391 Antoniy (as Metropolitan of Halych)

Disestablishment of the Metropolis of Halych

Establishment of the "Metropolis of Kiev, Rus' and Lithuania" (1375)
Disestablishment of the "Metropolis of Kiev, Rus' and Lithuania" (1376)

== Sources ==
- Majeska, George P. (1984). Russian Travelers to Constantinople in the Fourteenth and Fifteenth Centuries. Dumbarton Oaks. ISBN 0-88402-101-7.
- Rowell, S. C. (1994). Lithuania Ascending: A Pagan Empire Within East-Central Europe, 1295–1345. Cambridge Studies in Medieval Life and Thought: Fourth Series. Cambridge University Press. ISBN 978-0-521-45011-9.
