= Metropolitan Peter =

Metropolitan Peter may refer to:

- Peter of Moscow (died 1326), metropolitan of Kiev
- Petro Mohyla (1596–1647), metropolitan of Kiev and Ecumenical Patriarch
- Petar II Petrović-Njegoš (1813–1851), metropolitan of Cetinje and ruler of Montenegro
- Peter of Krutitsy (1862–1937), head of the Russian Orthodox Church

== See also ==
- Peter Akerovich, sometimes identified as the vicar of the metropolitanate of Kiev in 1244–1245
