= Cyprian, Metropolitan of Kiev =

Metropolitan of Kiev and All Rus' (1375–1406)

Saint Cyprian, Metropolitan of Kiev
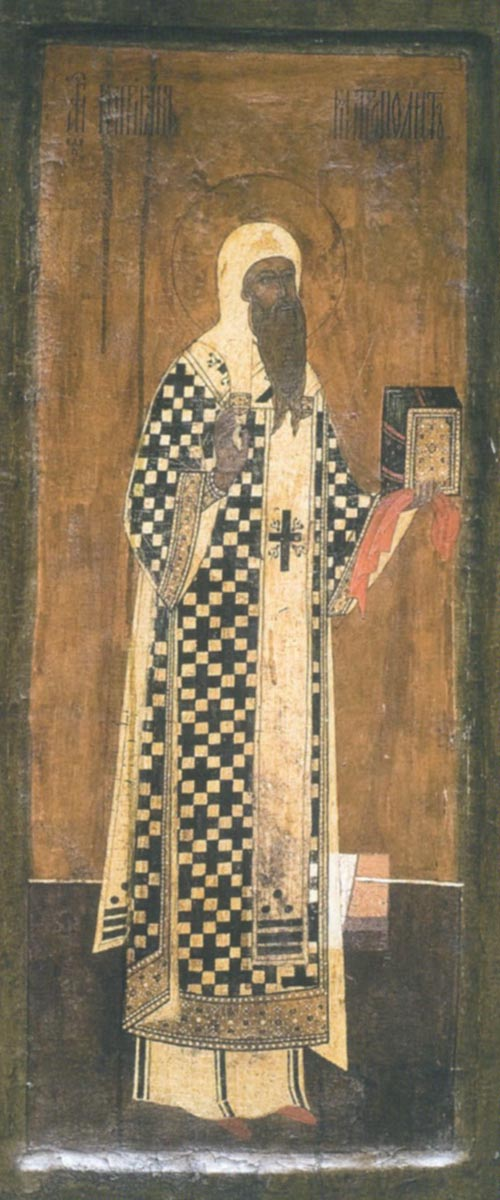
- Icon of the 17th century in Assumption Cathedral Kremlin.

Metropolitan of Kiev, Rus' and Lithuania (1375–1376) Metropolitan of Kiev and all Rus' (1376–1406)
- Born: c. 1336; Bulgaria
- Died: 16 September 1406
- Venerated in: Eastern Orthodox Church; Catholic Church
- Feast: 16 September (Eastern Orthodox)

Saint Cyprian, Metropolitan of Kiev
- Metropolitan of Kiev and All Rus'
- Church: Russian Orthodox Church
- See: Moscow
- Installed: 1381–1382, 1390–1406
- Predecessor: Alexius
- Successor: Photius

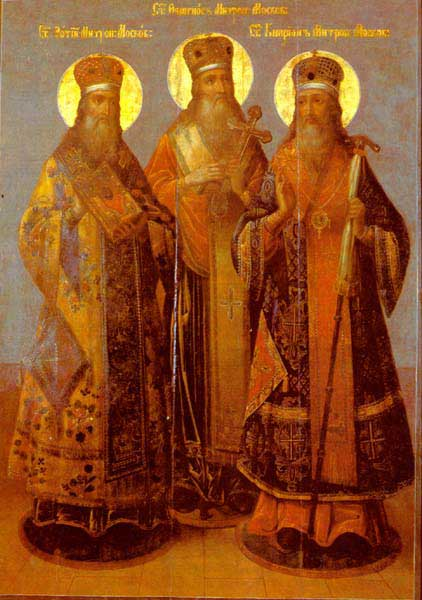
Theognostus, Cyprian, Photius

Cyprian (Note: Bulgarian: Киприан; Russian: Киприан; Belarusian: Кіпрыян; Ukrainian: Кипріан.) (c. 1336 – 16 September 1406) was a prelate of Bulgarian origin, who served as the Metropolitan of Kiev, Rus' and Lithuania (2 December 1375 – 12 February 1376) and the Metropolitan of Kiev and all Rus' (12 February 1376 – 16 September 1406) in the Ecumenical Patriarchate of Constantinople. During both periods, he was opposed by rival hierarchs and by the grand prince of Moscow. He was known as a bright opinion writer, editor, translator, and book copyist. He is commemorated by the Russian Orthodox Church on May 27 and September 16 (O.S.).

== Early life ==
Cyprian was a clergyman of Bulgarian origin. He is supposed to have been born in aristocratic family of Tsamblak family from the capital Tarnovo. After his upbringing, education, and worldview, he was a hesychast. As a young man Cyprian studied at Kilifarevo, just south of Tarnovo, where he possible accepted his monastic vows and where a disciple of Gregory of Sinai named Theodosius of Tarnovo, who had founded a Hesychast monastery. In Kilifarevo monastery Cyprian met with future Bulgarian patriarch (between 1375 and 1393) Euthymius, who also was studying hesychasm and was later regarded as one of the most important figures of medieval Bulgaria. In 1363 along with Euthymius, Theodosius, and two of Theodosius's followers, Cyprian arrived in Constantinople where he was introduced to Patriarch Callistus I and for a few months studied at the Monastery of Stoudios. Following the death of Theodosius (27 November 1363), Cyprian continued his studies at Mount Athos, becoming a Hesychast. On the other hand, according to Dimitri Obolensky, Cyprian only became a monk in the early 1370s in Constantinople. At Mount Athos Cyprian befriended Philotheus Kokkinos. In the beginning of the 1370s, after the return of Philotheus to the patriarchal throne, Cyprian became "his closest monk".

== Background ==
In 1356, after diplomatic struggles, Patriarch Callistus I of Constantinople united the Metropolis of Halych with the Metropolis of Lithuania under the leadership of Metropolitan Roman. Callistus also confirmed that Alexius remained in possession of the "Metropolis of Kiev and all Rus'". All eparchies of the Halych metropolis were transferred to the jurisdiction of a united "Metropolis of Lithuania-Volhynia" (also known as "Lithuania–Halych"). The rivalry between Roman and Alexius continued until Roman's death in 1362, when Lithuania–Halych was placed under the control of Alexius. In 1371, the united metropolis was officially lowered to the rank of a bishopric and placed under the jurisdiction of the Metropolitan of Kiev and all Rus'. However, it did not end the political rivalry for religious influence in Rus'.

== Career ==
=== Hostilities between Lithuania and Muscovy ===
The Grand Duke of Lithuania — Algirdas — attacked Muscovy on three occasions between 1368 and 1372 as part of the Lithuanian–Muscovite War. This was in support of his ally, Mikhail II, Prince of Tver. It may also have been motivated by a desire to advance his calls for a separate metropolis for the Grand Duchy that was independent of Moscow. Cyprian was sent by the Patriarch as a trustee (envoy) to the Rus' princes in the Lithuanian and Muscovite lands with the goal to reconcile the Lithuanian and Tverite princes with Metropolitan Alexius and to prevent the total division of the Church between Wilno and Moscow. In winter of the same year, it is possible that Cyprian visited Kiev for the first time along with other cities of the Grand Duchy of Lithuania. On 9 March 1374 he visited Tver on the consecration of the Bishop of Tver, Euthymius. Later, with Metropolitan Alexius, he left for Pereslavl-Zalessky. Cyprian returned to Constantinople from the Grand Duchy of Lithuania carrying a letter from Orthodox Christian Lithuanian-Ruthenian with a request to the patriarch to consecrate him as the Metropolitan of Lithuania.

Hostilities between Moscow and Lithuania resumed; in August 1375 Muscovite troops captured Tver. Patriarch Philotheus I was aware of the threat of Catholization of the population of the Grand Duchy of Lithuania. He therefore agreed to satisfy the petitions of the previous Grand Duke of Lithuania —Algirdas — to create a separate metropolis in the territory of the Grand Duchy of Lithuania. Philotheus also listened to the petitions of the Eastern Orthodox princes to have Cyprian as their metropolitan. On 2 December 1375 at the Council of Constantinople, Philotheus consecrated Cyprian as "Metropolitan of Kiev, Rus' and Lithuania", under a condition that "upon the death of Alexius, Cyprian should become the Metropolitan of Kiev and all Rus".

=== Metropolitan of Kiev and all Rus' ===
On 6 June 1376, Cyprian arrived at his residence in Kiev. He attempted, but failed, to get recognition of his rights in the metropolitan diocese from the Grand Duke of Moscow — Dmitri Donskoi. In fear of his life both from the Grand Duke as well as the approaching armies of Tokhtamysh, Cyprian chose to live either in Lithuania or at Constantinople. On 12 February 1378, Alexius died; by the terms of the agreement with the patriarch, Cyprian was entitled to rule the religious affairs of all Rus'. Instead, the Grand Prince deposed him without seeking the permission of the Ecumenical Patriarchate of Constantinople. In his place, the Grand Prince appointed Pimen (1380–1384). Later, the Grand Prince also deposed Pimen. He next appointed Dionysius (1384–1385), again without the permission of Constantinople. In February 1389, Patriarch Antony IV of Constantinople convened a council that restored the unity of the metropolis by finally recognizing Cyprian as "the true bishop of all Rus'". In 1390, Cyprian returned to Moscow and was recognised as the legitimate Metropolitan of Kiev and all Rus' by the new Grand Prince — Vasili II. Cyprian held this title until his death in 1406. During his term, his main objectives were to preserve a unified metropolis in Rus' and to secure peace with Lithuania.

== Achievements ==
Cyprian is remembered as a wise and experienced church administrator who fought for the unity of the Russian church. In fact, he is mainly responsible for uniting the Church in the Grand Duchy of Moscow and the Grand Duchy of Lithuania. He faced serious opposition during his metropolitanate; Dmitry Donskoy and his advisors were excommunicated for opposing Cyprian's efforts to take up his place in Moscow, and Novgorod the Great – especially Archbishops Aleksei and Ioann II – also opposed his efforts to adjudicate ecclesiastical cases there, which would have allowed him to gain the court fees from Novgorod during the time he sat in judgement there.

Cyprian was an erudite person and alumnus of Tarnovo Literary School. He oversaw the copying and creation of a number of important works, including the Troitskaia Chronicle (or Troitskaya letopis) and, probably, the Metropolitan Justice (also known as the Pravosudiye metropolich’ye or Правосудие митрополичье). He also rewrote the Life of Metropolitan Peter, originally written around 1327. He also corrected biblical books and translated a number of ecclesiastic works from Greek into Old Church Slavic.

The Book of Degrees (Stepénnaya kniga), which grouped Russian monarchs in the order of their generations, was started by Cyprian in 1390 (but completed only in 1563).

== Death ==
He died on 16 September 1406. Cyprian is buried in the Assumption Cathedral in the Moscow Kremlin. He was canonized by the Russian Orthodox Church in the 15th century. St. Kiprian Peak on Greenwich Island in the South Shetland Islands, Antarctica is named for Cyprian.

== Sources ==
- Cyprian, Metropolitan of Moscow, Orthodox Church in America: http://oca.org/saints/lives/2016/09/16/102627-repose-of-st-cyprian-the-metropolitan-of-moscow-and-all-russia
- N. F. Droblenkova and G. M. Prokhorov, “Kiprian (ok. 1330-16.IX.1406) Mitropolit Kievskii i vseia Rusi,” in D. S. Likhachev, Slovar knizhnikov i knizhnosti drevnei Rusi, vol. 2, pt. 1, pp. 464-465.
- Majeska, George P. (1984). Russian Travelers to Constantinople in the Fourteenth and Fifteenth Centuries. Dumbarton Oaks. ISBN 0-88402-101-7.
- Rowell, S. C. (1994). Lithuania Ascending: A Pagan Empire Within East-Central Europe, 1295–1345. Cambridge Studies in Medieval Life and Thought: Fourth Series. Cambridge University Press. ISBN 978-0-521-45011-9.
- Cyprian, Metropolitan at the Encyclopedia of Ukraine

Андреев В.Ф. Из истории Русской Церкви XIV-XV веков. Митрополит св. Киприан. Великий Новгород, 2008.

Eastern Orthodox Church titles
Preceded by New creation	Metropolitan of Kiev, Russia and Lithuania (Ecumenical Patriarchate of Constantinople); 2 December 1375–12 February 1378	Succeeded by Title abolished

Eastern Orthodox Church titles
Preceded by Alexius	Metropolitan of Kiev and all Rus' (Ecumenical Patriarchate of Constantinople); 12 February 1378–16 September 1406	Succeeded by Pimen (contested); Dionysius I (contested); Photius (recognised by Constantinople)
