= Dionysius I =

Dionysius I may refer to:

- Dionysius I of Syracuse (ca. 432–367 BC), Greek tyrant of Syracuse
- Dionysius I (Syriac Patriarch), or Dionysius Telmaharensis (died 845), Patriarch of the Syriac Orthodox Church
- Dionysius I, Metropolitan of Moscow (died 1385)
- Patriarch Dionysius I of Constantinople (died 1492), Patriarch of Constantinople
- Mar Dionysius I (died 1808), Metropolitan of the Malankara Church
