= Patriarch Alexy of Moscow =

Patriarch Alexy of Moscow may refer to:

- Patriarch Alexy I of Moscow and All Russia (1877–1970), ruled in 1945–1970
- Patriarch Alexy II of Moscow and All Russia (1928–2008), ruled in 1990–2008

== See also ==
- Alexius, Metropolitan of Moscow (c. 1296–1378)
