= PEČAT-type coin =

Early Lithuanian mint

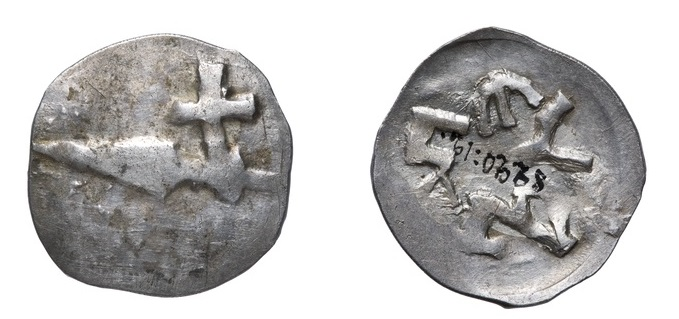
PEČAT-type coin with a joint symbol of a spearhead and a cross.

PEČAT or ПЕЧАТЬ -type coin was the first Lithuanian coin minted in the fourth quarter of the 14th c. in Vilnius, the capital city of Grand Duchy of Lithuania. They were minted by Jogaila, Vytautas the Great, and possibly Algirdas or Skirgaila. The coins depict a unique symbol consisting of a spearhead with a cross. The name comes from the fact that on the reverse a circular inscription ПЕЧАТЬ in Cyrillic letters is impressed. The word means "stamp".

A particularly important argument for determining the time of minting the PEČAT-type coins is the Borshchiv treasure where a PEČAT-type coin was found along with the Novgorod Republic's hryvnia, Grand Prince of Kyiv Vladimir Olgerdovich's coins, and Golden Horde's Khans' dirhams (the latest coins of them are of Khan Tokhtamysh, minted in the early 1380s).

Coins of this type were used simultaneously by both Jogaila and Vytautas, who fought against each other in the Lithuanian Civil War (1381–1384). PEČAT-type coins are sometimes attributed to Grand Duke Algirdas' reign as well and the use of a cross on a pagan ruler's coins can be considered as a diplomatic gesture of the pagan ruler towards Christian counterparts. or to showcase Algirdas' marriages with Orthodox princesses, especially Uliana of Tver. Vladimir Olgerdovich, son and vassal of Algirdas, minted his own coins at the Principality of Kyiv since the 1360s.
