= George of Kiev =

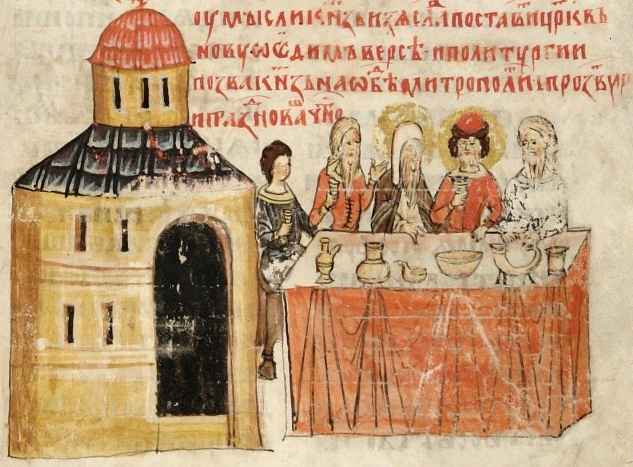

George (Георгий in Russian, died 1079) was an Eastern Orthodox Metropolitan of Kiev and all Rus', serving from 1069 to 1073.

George was the seventh Byzantine church leader in Kievan Rus, and he arrived to what is now Ukraine around 1062. George did not recognize the sanctity of the local martyrs, and four years after his appointment he returned to Byzantium.

Metropolitan George is credited as author of polemical work "Struggle against the Latina" (Stiazanie s latinoiu) in relation to the 1054 East–West Schism.

== See also ==
- Theological differences between the Catholic Church and the Eastern Orthodox Church

Preceded by	Metropolitan of Kiev and All-Rus'; 1069–1073	Succeeded by
