= Kirill II of Kiev =

Kirill II, Kyrylo II or Cyril II (Russian: Кирилл II; Ukrainian: Кирило, romanized: Kyrylo; died 6 December 1281) was the metropolitan of Kiev from 1242 until his death. He was close to the khan of the Golden Horde, Mengu-Timur.

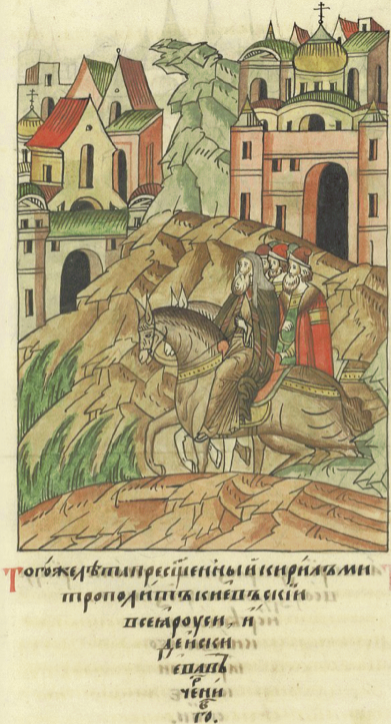
Miniature from the Illustrated Chronicle of Ivan the Terrible

== Biography ==
Kirill was appointed metropolitan of Kiev by Daniel of Galicia. Soviet historians such as Mikhail Priselkov (1940) and Dmitry Likhachev (1947) have asserted that Kirill moved his official residence as metropolitan from Kiev to Vladimir on the Klyazma from about the year 1250, and thereafter made only infrequent journeys south to Kiev. This view was challenged by historians Joseph T. Fuhrmann (1976) and Donald Ostrowski (1993), who pointed out several entries in Rus' chronicles such as the Nikon Chronicle indicating that Kiev remained the de jure and de facto residence of Kirill during his entire tenure as metropolitan, as well as the early years of his successor Maximos.

Prior to 1251 was close to Prince Daniel of Galicia (Danylo Halytskyi).

In 1246 on the road to Nicaea he was negotiating with the Hungarian King Bela IV, which resulted in the marriage of a Hungarian princess to Daniel Galitsky.

Around 1251 Kirill left Daniel Galitsky, who in 1254 received the royal crown from the Pope.

In 1251, he went to Novgorod, where he first met with Alexander Nevsky. Soviet and modern Russian historians have argued that after this encounter, Kirill almost continuously resided in the north-east, working closely with Prince Alexander Nevsky, constantly traveling around the country.

In 1252, Alexander Nevsky became a ruler of Vladimir instead of his brother Andrew Yaroslavich, and the Metropolitan solemnly met Alexander Nevsky, who had recently returned with a Jarlig to rule on behalf of the Khan, and supported his reign. Prince Alexander Nevsky and Kirill acquiesced to Mongol domination and vassalage.

Rus' chronicles record that khan Mengu-Timur and Metropolitan Kirill sent Sarai Bishop Theognostus to the Emperor Michael VIII and the Patriarch of Constantinople as their joint envoy with letters and gifts from each of them. This embassy was probably held around 1278, as Theognostus returned to Sarai in 1279.

It appears that relations with Egypt were also discussed by Theognostus with the emperor and the patriarch. Anyway, at about the same time, Meng-Timur tried to establish direct diplomatic ties with Egypt through Constantinople.

== Church ==
Around 1252 Cyril received a charter from Batu Khan, which guaranteed the inviolability of the Orthodox Church. A charter of 1267, issued by Berke Khan, has been authentically preserved. In 1258 he founded the bishopric in Tver. In 1261, with the assistance of Alexander Nevsky, an Orthodox diocese was founded in Sarai. In 1274 a council of bishops of the Russian Church was held in Vladimir, with the aim to order and restore the ecclesiastical legislation.

In 1279, Khan Meng-Timur issued a charter that defended the faith and the sanctity of the rights of clergy from abuse by Mongol officials. Kirill appointed bishops to Vladimir, Rostov and Sarai.

Kirill died in Pereslavl-Zalessky, Grand Duchy of Vladimir and Suzdal. At first his body was moved to Vladimir, but later to Kiev where he was buried on a territory of the Sophia Cathedral compound.

== Bibliography ==
- Ostrowski, Donald (1993). "Why did the Metropolitan Move from Kiev to Vladimir in the Thirteenth Century". Christianity and the Eastern Slavs. Volume I: Slavic Cultures in the Middle Ages. Berkeley: University of California Press. pp. 83–101. ISBN 9780520360198. doi:10.1525/9780520313606-009
  - Ostrowski, Don (30 December 2015). "The Move of the Metropolitan from Kiev in 1299". Academia.edu. p. 26. (updated, open-source version of the same article)

Preceded by Joseph	Metropolitan of Kiev and all Rus'; 1250–1281	Succeeded by Maximus
