= Nicephorus II of Kiev =

Nicephorus II or Nikephoros II was the Metropolitan of Kiev and All-Rus' from 1183 to 1198.

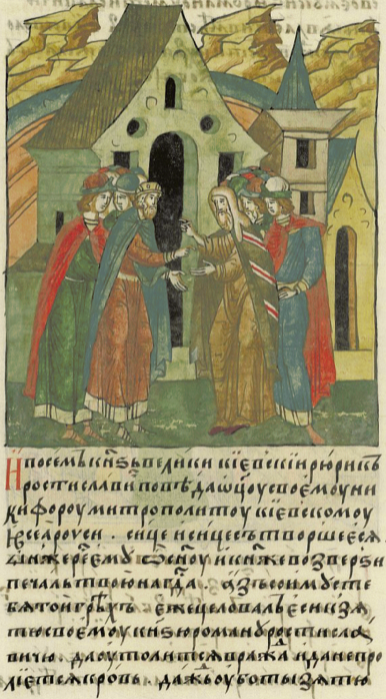
Council of Nicephorus II and Rurik Rostislavich, miniature from the Illustrated Chronicle of Ivan the Terrible

Of a Hellenic descent, his stay on the Metropolitan episcopal cathedra was marked by increasingly complex events of inter-princely relations and contradictions. One of the first acts that very clearly revealed such problems was the appointment of Nicholas the Greek to the Rostov bishopric by Metropolitan Nicephorus II in 1183. This event was even recorded by the Chronicle, which eloquently presented the reasons for the prince's antipathy towards the new metropolitan: "In the same year [1183] the bishop of Polotsk, named Dionysius, died, and we will therefore talk about this. When Leon, the bishop of Rostov, died, Nicholas the Greek was presented as bishop. But Vsevolod Yurievich, the prince of Suzdal, did not accept him, and sent [an envoy] to Kiev to Svyatoslav Vsevolodovich and to Metropolitan Nicephorus, saying: “The people of our land did not elect this one. And if you have appointed him, then wherever you please, keep him there. And appoint for me Luka, the humble in spirit and meek abbot of the Holy Savior at the Berestove.” Although Metropolitan Nicephorus did not want to appoint him, he, strongly urged by Vsevolod and Svyatoslav, appointed Luka bishop in the Suzdal land, and [Nicholas] sent him to Polotsk to be bishop. As we can see from the chronicle, the prince of Suzdal Vsevolod Yuryevich the Great Nest, in rejecting the new bishop, referred to the already existing custom in that region "to elect a bishop by the people of our land."

The subsequent consecrations of bishops for Metropolitan Nicephorus II of Kyiv were no longer so problematic. Thus, in the autumn of 1186, the Novgorodians (people of the Great Novgorod) elected Gabriel (in monasticism Gregory, later glorified as a saint), the brother of Archbishop Elijah, who had died on September 7 of the same year, to the widowed see. Metropolitan Nicephorus II, as noted, with the Ruthenian princes, having summoned Gabriel to Kyiv, on March 29, 1187, ordained him Archbishop of Novgorod. Following that, two years later [1189] Metropolitan Nicephorus II granted the request of Grand Duke Rurik Rostislavich and ordained Adrian, the prince's spiritual father of Bilhorod, hegumen of the Kiev-Vydubychi Michael's Monastery, as bishop: "In the same year [1189] Bishop Maxim of Bilhorod died, and Rurik appointed his spiritual father Andrian, hegumen of the [monastery] of St. Michael Vydobytsky, as bishop in his place." Similarly, in Kyiv Metropolitan Nicephorus II, on January 23, 1190, at the request of Prince Vsevolod Yurievich of Suzdal, appointed his confessor Jona as Bishop of Rostov, who took over the see after the death of Luka. On December 10, 1193, Metropolitan Nicephorus II ordained Bishop Martyrius, surnamed Rushanin, to Novgorod, who was chosen by lot from three candidates for the archbishopric after the death of Gabriel. The later was also glorified among the saints. In 1197, at the request of Prince Vsevolod Yurievich, Metropolitan Nicephorus II ordained Paul as bishop of Pereyaslav-Ruthenian. Also in 1190, with the support of the Kiev prince, Metropolitan Nicephorus II managed to establish a new, twelfth (12th) diocese of the Ruthenian Orthodox Church, the bishopric of Ryazan.

It is known that Metropolitan Nicephorus II of Kyiv and All Rus', after his arrival at the see, ordained Presbyter Vasily, who was a priest of the church at Shchekavytsia, as archimandrite of the Kyiv Pechersk Monastery. In this God-pleasing work, the saint was assisted by the Bishop of Turov, Lawrence (1182–1194), the newly appointed Bishop of Polotsk, Nicholas the Greek, and all the hegumens of the Kyiv monasteries. This event is recorded in the Tale of Bygone Years and the Kyiv Caves Patericon.

In 1189 Nicephorus II was calling on Svyatoslav and Ryurik, the Grand Princes of Kyiv to liberate the Princely Halych from Hungarian occupation.

In 1194 Nicephorus led the ceremony of enthronement of Ryurik Rostislavich which took place in the Saint Sophia Cathedral in Kyiv.

Preceded by John V of Kiev	Metropolitan of Kiev and All-Rus'; 1183–1198	Succeeded by Matthew of Kiev
