= Ukrainian Autonomous Orthodox Church =

The Ukrainian Autonomous Orthodox Church (Ukrainian: Українська Автономна Православна Церква, romanized: Ukraïns'ka Avtonomna Pravoslavna Tserkva) was a short-lived confession that existed on territory of the Reichskommissariat Ukraine at the time when Ukraine was occupied by Nazi Germany during the Second World War.

== History ==
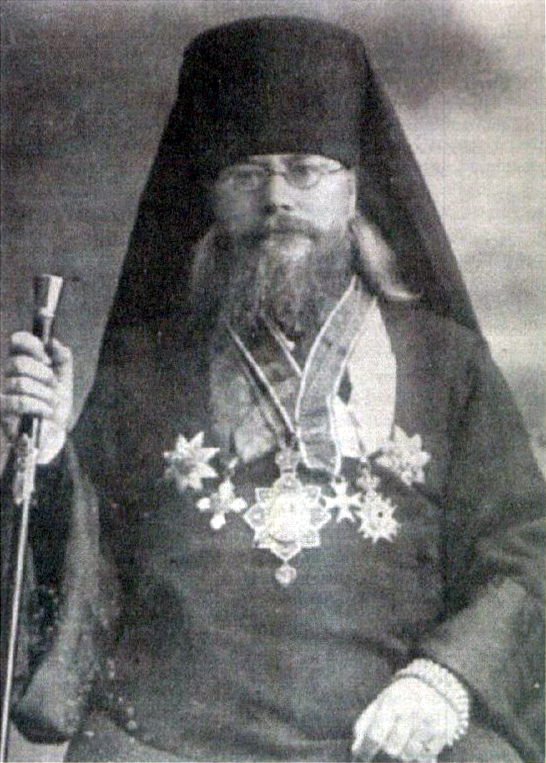
Aleksy Hromadsky

The church was established on August 18, 1941, by a synod of Ukrainian bishops in Pochaiv Lavra headed by Archbishop Alexy (Hromadsky) of Lutsk, who became the new church's metropolitan.

The church's founders announced their intention to achieve Autocephalous status for the Ukrainian Church but rejected the path towards autocephaly adopted by the renewed Ukrainian Autocephalous Orthodox Church, declaring it uncanonical and unilateralist, as it had simply announced its independence. As such, the new church was proclaimed under the canonical link to the Moscow Patriarchate and invoked the 1918 decision of the Russian Orthodox Church that granted autonomy to the Ukrainian Church. Despite recognizing the spiritual authority of the Moscow Patriarchate over Ukraine, they considered this authority suspended as long as the patriarch was under Soviet control. At the same time, the bishops rejected the idea of Ukraine being the canonical territory of the Polish Orthodox Church, although the Polish Orthodox Metropolitan Dionysius continued to claim jurisdiction over the Western Ukrainian territories formerly controlled by Poland between the World Wars.

The UAOC's influence spread from Volhynia to the Dnieper Ukraine, where several parishes and monasteries joined the church, including the Kyiv Pechersk Lavra, the cradle of Eastern Orthodox Christianity in the region. This church appealed to the ethnic Russians and Russian speaking population of Ukraine, while the Ukrainian Autocephalous Orthodox Church was closely tied to the Ukrainian nationalist movement. Although some attempts were made to unite the two jurisdictions in 1941–2, these ultimately failed.

The spread of the church brought about a fierce rivalry within the church, which was suppressed by the Soviet authorities but revived under the German occupation. Metropolitan Alexy and Bishop Mstyslav of the Autocephalous Church attempted unification of the two churches, and an Act of Unity was signed in Pochaiv on 8 October 1942. Under the pressure from his synod of bishops, Alexy later renounced the union, withdrawing his signature, and on 7 May 1943 he was murdered, it is said by nationalists from the Ukrainian Insurgent Army, who saw this as an act of treason.

After the murder of Metropolitan Alexy, the church was led by Archbishop Panteleymon (Rudyk) and the relationship with the Ukrainian Autocephalous Orthodox Church remained tense throughout 1943–44, by which time the Red Army offensive pushed the German invaders out of Ukraine.

Upon the liberation of Ukraine from Nazi occupation, Ukraine Autonomous Orthodox Church's hierarchs joined the Russian Orthodox Church, with those outside of the USSR joining the Russian Orthodox Church Outside of Russia.

== See also ==
- History of Christianity in Ukraine
