= Peter Akerovich =

Metropolitan of Kiev from 1241 to 1245

Peter Akerovich (Note: Russian: Пётр Акерович; Ukrainian: Петро Акерович.) was Metropolitan of Kiev from 1241 to 1245.

== Life ==
He was born into a boyar family. He became hegumen of the Saint Saviour Monastery in Berestovo, and from 1240, an Orthodox bishop.

Akerovich participated in the First Council of Lyon in 1245, where he informed the Catholic West of the Tatar threat. He was employed by Grand Prince Michael of Chernigov in diplomatic service.

Nothing is known of Akerovich after 1246.

== Notes ==
Preceded by Joseph of Kiev	Metropolitan of Kiev and All Rus'; 1241–1246	Succeeded by Cyril III of Kiev
