= Poemenius (mythology) =

Figure in Greek mythology

In Greek mythology, Poemenius or Poemenios (Ancient Greek: Ποιμένιος) was one of the leaders of the satyrs who joined the army of Dionysus in his campaign against India.
