= Maximos, Metropolitan of Kiev =

Rus' bishop

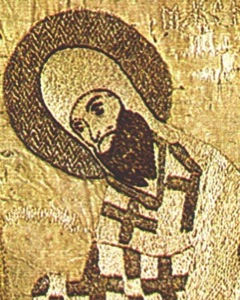
Maximos, Metropolitan of all Rus'

Maximus or Maximos (Russian: Максим, romanized: Maksim; Ukrainian: Максим, romanized: Maksym; died 6 December 1305) was a metropolitan bishop of the Metropolis of Kiev and all Rus' in the Ecumenical Patriarchate of Constantinople. He was consecrated in Constantinople and reigned from 1283 to 1305. Maximos was of Greek origin.

At that time, the Rus' princes were vassals of the Golden Horde. Khan Tokhta wanted to eliminate the princes' semi-independence. To that effect, he had sent his brother Tudan to the Rus' lands in 1293. Tudan's army devastated fourteen towns. Tokhta himself (also known as Tokhta-Temur) went to Tver and forced Dmitry of Pereslavl (also known as Dmitry Alexandrovich), who was allied to Nogai Khan, to abdicate. Rus' chronicles depicted these events as "The harsh-time of Batu returns.". Some sources suggest that Tokhta and Nogai, who was effectively the co-emperor, had worked together.

Maximos was known for his ecclesiastic trips to the Golden Horde and for mediating between the quarreling princes of the north-eastern Rus' (e.g. Dmitry of Pereslav and Andrey of Gorodets, the sons of Alexander Nevsky). Under instructions from the Khan, Maximus left Kiev in 1299 and transferred the metropolitan chair to the city of Vladimir on the Klyazma which is situated 200 kilometers (120 mi) east of Moscow. Following that, Patriarch Athanasius I of Constantinople established the Metropolis of Halych in 1303 with its see in Halych in the Kingdom of Galicia–Volhynia.

In 1301, Maximos attended a patriarchal council in Constantinople. He supported the Prince of Tver and Vladimir Mikhail Yaroslavich in his struggle with Prince of Moscow Yuri Danilovich for the title of Grand Prince of Vladimir.

He was canonised a saint in the Russian Orthodox Church in 1982, and his feast day is celebrated on December 6 (December 19, N.S.).

== Bibliography ==
- Ivakin, Hleb Yuriyovych (1996). Історичний розвиток Києва XIII — середина XVI ст [Historical development of Kyiv in the 13th to mid-16th centuries] (in Ukrainian). Kyiv. p. 272. ISBN 5-85654-047-6.
- Artemenko, I.I. (1982). История Киева в трех томах, четырех книгах. Том первый. Древний и средневековый Киев [History of Kiev in three volumes, four books. Volume one. Ancient and Medieval Kiev] (in Russian). Kiev: Naukova Dumka. p. 408.
- Ostrowski, Donald (2023) [1993]. "Why Did the Metropolitan Move from Kiev to Vladimir in the Thirteenth Century?". California Slavic Studies. Volume 16. University of California Press. pp. 83–101. doi:10.1525/9780520313606-009. ISBN 9780520313606.
  - Ostrowski, Don (30 December 2015). "The Move of the Metropolitan from Kiev in 1299". Academia.edu. p. 26. (updated, open-source version of the same article)

Preceded by Kirill II	Metropolitan of Kiev and all Rus' (Ecumenical Patriarchate of Constantinople); 1285–1305	Succeeded by Peter
