= Kliment Smoliatich =

Klim(ent) Smoliatich (died after 1164) was the Metropolitan of Kiev and All-Rus' from 1147 to 1154.

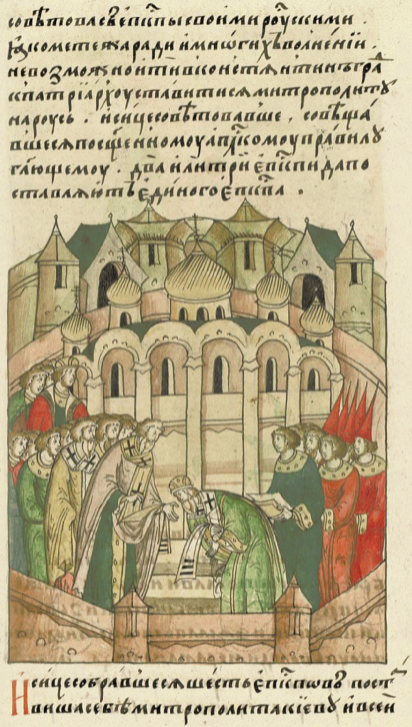
Consecration of Clement as Metropolitan, miniature from the Illustrated Chronicle of Ivan the Terrible

Originally from the Smolensk region (whence his surname), Klim became a monk of the Zarub Monastery. He was elected metropolitan by a synod of the hierarchy of the Rus' church under pressure from Prince Iziaslav Mstislavich. However, his election was never confirmed by the Patriarch of Constantinople.

Klim was also opposed by Prince Yuri Dolgorukiy, Iziaslav's rival, and the bishop of Novgorod the Great, Niphont. After Iziaslav's death he was forced to abdicate as metropolitan and became bishop of Volodymyr-Volynskyi. Klim was an erudite sermonizer and philosopher. His best-known work is Poslaniie do presvitera Khomy (Letter to Presbyter Khoma), which has survived in two manuscript forms. It contains a symbolic explanation of the Holy Scriptures, and demonstrates his knowledge of Homer, Plato, and Aristotle. Other works are also attributed to him.

Preceded by Michael II of Kiev	Metropolitan of Kiev and All-Rus'; 1147–1154	Succeeded by Constantine I of Kiev
