= Metropolis of Kiev and all Rus' =

Eastern Orthodox Metropolis (988–1596)

The Metropolis of Kiev and all Rus' (Ukrainian: Митрополит Київський та всієї Русі, romanized: Mytropolyt Kyivskyi ta vsiiei Rusi) was a metropolis of the Eastern Orthodox Church that was erected on the territory of Kievan Rus'. It existed between 988 AD and 1590s AD. The long lasting "tug of war" between bishops from the Grand Duchy of Lithuania and bishops of the Principality of Moscow resulted in reorganization of the metropolis as the bishops from Moscow refused to recognize decisions of the Ecumenical Patriarch of Constantinople. Canonically, it was under the jurisdiction of the Ecumenical Patriarchate of Constantinople. The metropolitan seat (cathedra) was located in the city of Kiev until it was moved to Vladimir-na-Klyazme in 1299 and then Moscow in 1325.

The metropolis was later revived in the territory of the Polish–Lithuanian Commonwealth from 1620 AD to 1686 AD as an exarchate of the Ecumenical Patriarchate. Again, to reflect its exclusion from the Tsardom of Russia, this episcopal title was renamed the "Metropolis of Kiev, Galicia and all Rus'". The fate of the metropolis after that date is a matter of dispute: according to the Orthodox Church of Ukraine, the metropolis was uncanonically annexed or was in abeyance until it received the tomos of autocephaly from the Ecumenical Patriarch; on the other hand, the Russian Orthodox Church (ROC) maintains that it was absorbed by the Patriarchate of Moscow and all Rus' and is currently an exarchate of the ROC that styles itself on the Ukrainian Orthodox Church (Moscow Patriarchate) (UOC-MP).

== History to the Union of Florence ==
=== Christianization of Kievan Rus' ===
The history of the Orthodox Church in the region of Kievan Rus' is usually traced to the Baptism of Rus' at Kiev. While the date of this event is commonly given as 988, the evidence is contested. In that year, the Grand Prince of Kiev—Vladimir the Great—together with his people, were baptised in the river Dniper by clergy of the Ecumenical Patriarch of Constantinople. There is a legendary account that the first bishop might have been dispatched to Kiev in 864 by the Patriarch Photios I. If true, it would have occurred after Kiev had been captured by the Varangians in 860. It is possible that a Prince of Kiev—Askold—might have been baptized due to the existence of the church of Saint Nicholas at Askold's Grave. During the reign of Prince Igor of Kiev, in Kiev existed the Saint Elijah Church, while during signing the 944 treaty with the Greeks some Ruthenians took an oath on the Bible. From its foundation, the metropolis was subordinate to the Ecumenical Patriarchate of Constantinople:

When the historical data, coming out of the fog of ambiguity, become accurate, they tell us about the dependence of our Church in hierarchical management on the Patriarch of Constantinople. Given that such data date back to the time of Prince Yaroslav, son and successor to the princely throne of Volodymyr, it is quite correct, in the absence of other information, we must assume that this dependence of our Church on Constantinople was under Prince Vladimir, ie from acceptance by him and our ancestors of the Christian faith from Byzantium

— Ivan Vlasovskyi, church historian

=== Establishment of the metropolitan see ===
It is not known for certain when the Metropolis of Kiev was established. The earliest recorded metropolitan bishop is Michael of Kiev (988–992). He was appointed by the Ecumenical Patriarch of Constantinople—Nicholas II of Constantinople. He was given the title of Metropolitan of Kiev and all Rus'. The cathedra was located in the city of Kiev (or possibly Tmutarakan).

In 1037, Prince Yaroslav the Wise built a new cathedral – St. Sophia – and moved the metropolitan seat there. In 1051, Yaroslav the Wise contrived to have a Ruthenian candidate elected as metropolitan—Hilarion of Kiev. He reorganized the church hierarchy and improved the structure of the metropolis.

A delegation of the metropolis, blessed by Metropolitan Ivan III, took part in the Council of Bari (1089) that was convened by Pope Urban II to heal the Great Schism. Members of this mission were in Bari to consecrate the transferred tomb of St. Nicholas of Myra. After that time came the rise of the cult of Saint Nicholas in Rus'.

During the pre-Mongol period, there were 22 metropolitans. Most were Greeks sent by the patriarchs of Constantinople. The natives of the lands of Rus' were Hilarion of Kiev (1051–1062), Ephraim of Pereyaslavl (1089–1097), Kliment Smoliatich, and Kirill II of Kiev (1233–1236).

On the eve of the Mongol-Tatar invasion, there were 16 dioceses in the metropolis: Kyiv (988), Chernihiv (991), Belgorod (991), Vladimir (992), Novgorod (992), Rostov (992), Polatsk (992), Turiv (1005), Przemyśl (1026), Pereiaslav (1036), Yurii (1036), Galician (1134), Smolensk (1137), Riazan (1198), Suzdal (1213).

=== Fragmentation of Kievan Rus' ===
By the late 12th century, Kievan Rus' was beginning to fragment into a number of principalities. One of the most influential of these was the Grand Duchy of Vladimir under the Rurik dynasty. Grand Duke Vladimir II Monomakh founded the eponymous city of Vladimir which is located 200 kilometers (120 mi) east of Moscow. In 1113 he was popularly acclaimed as the supreme ruler of the Kievan Rus. Mstislav I of Kiev, who reigned from 20 May 1125 to 15 April 1132, was the last undisputed ruler of all Kievan Rus'. After his death, the throne of Kiev became an object of struggle between various territorial associations of Rurikid princes.

The younger son of Vladimir II, called Yuri Dolgorukiy (George), was the Grand Prince of Vladimir-Suzdal. Under his rule, the principality gained military strength. In the Suzdal-Ryazan war of 1146, it conquered the Ryazan Principality. Later in the 1150s, George twice occupied Kiev and seized the throne. He last ruled Kiev from August 1150 to the winter of 1151. His rule marked the effective end of the Rus' as a unified entity. From that time onwards, the lands of the northeastern Rus' played an important role in the politics of Kievan Rus'.

In March 1169, a coalition of native princes led by the Grand Prince of Vladimir-Suzdal—Andrey Bogolyubsky—sacked Kiev and forced the ruling prince—Mstislav II of Kiev—to flee to Volhynia. Andrei appointed his brother—Gleb of Kiev—as Prince of Kiev while Andrei himself continued to rule his realm from Vladimir on Klyazma. From that time onwards, north-eastern Rus', which was centered on the city of Vladimir, became one of the most influential Rus' lands. Following the Mongol invasions, three powerful states remained as the successors of Kievan Rus': the Principality of Vladimir-Suzdal in the north-east—which would evolve into the Principality of Muscovy; the Kingdom of Galicia–Volhynia in the south-west; and the Grand Duchy of Lithuania to the north.

=== Kievan Rus' under the Mongols ===
Kievan Rus in 1237

Following the Mongol invasion and the sack of Kiev in 1240, communications between Kiev and Constantinople deteriorated. Shortly after Kirill II of Kiev (1250–1281) was appointed as metropolitan, the founder of the Golden Horde—Batu Khan—demanded that he transfer the cathedra from Kiev to the city of Vladimir. The transfer did not occur until 1299 under Kirill's successor, Maximos. The hierarchs continued to be styled "Metropolitan of Kiev and all Rus"; they were supposed to be responsible for all Orthodox Christians in Rus, including those in Galicia, which became a kingdom in 1253, and the Grand Duchy of Lithuania which had gained control of the former Principality of Polotsk". In 1324, his successor—Peter of Moscow—again transferred the cathedra, this time to Moscow.

The Princes of the Grand Duchy of Vladimir effectively controlled the metropolitan see with the permission of the Khan of the Golden Horde. The most important Rus prince (usually the Prince of Moscow, but sometimes a Tver or another principality) continued to be styled the "Grand Prince of Vladimir". The Grand Princes were originally crowned in Vladimir's Cathedral of the Assumption. After the Mongol destruction, Vladimir never fully recovered. By the 14th Century, Moscow had superseded Vladimir as the seat of the Grand Prince. The title had become an honorific symbol of majesty. The princes chose to be crowned in the Cathedral of the Assumption in the Moscow Kremlin. This cathedral was a loose copy by the Italian architect Aristotele Fioravanti of the original in Vladimir.

=== Establishment of new metropolitan areas ===
==== Metropolis of Lithuania ====
Having escaped the brunt of the Mongol invasions, the Grand Duchy of Lithuania expanded into neighbouring areas that had been weakened by internal strife and by the Mongol predations. While these expansions were usually at the expense of slavic principalities of the former Kievan Rus', sometimes they were voluntary. For example, the dukes of the Principality of Turov began to cooperate more and more with the Grand Duchy and by the early 14th century the Principality non-violently joined the Grand Duchy. In 1320, most of the principalities of western Rus' were either made into vassals or were directly annexed by Lithuania. In 1321, Gediminas captured Kiev, sending Stanislav, the last Rurikid to rule Kiev, into exile. Gediminas also re-established the permanent capital of the Grand Duchy in Vilnius, presumably moving it from Old Trakai in 1323. The state continued to expand its territory under the reign of Grand Duke Algirdas and his brother Kęstutis, who both ruled the state in harmony.

At the time, religious allegiance played an important role in politics. While adhering to the pagan faith, Grand Dukes Vytenis and Gediminas understood the political importance of controlling the Church. Furthermore, the Metropolitan of Kiev and all Rus'—Peter of Moscow—moved the seat of the metropolis to Moscow. The lack of a metropolitan bishop for the inhabitants of the Grand Principality impeded the development of the idea of a single Lithuanian state that was being advanced by the ruling family. At the same time, the religious leaders in Rus' realised that the lack of a separate metropolis would leave the Lithuanian state susceptible to the influence of the Latin Church. In attempting to preserve the continued cultural and religious unity of Rus', the Orthodox leaders realised that they might ultimately drive the people into the arms of Rome. By the mid-1350's, the senior clergy of the Rus' in Lithuania were agreed that a separate Lithuanian metropolis was the lesser of two evils. The question was raised in their letters to patriarchate in Constantinople between 1328 and 1347. Consequently, the Grand Dukes of Lithuania requested the Patriarch to establish a separate diocese that was independent from Moscow.

The first Metropolitan of Lithuania—Theophilus—reigned from 1317 to 1329. Emperor Andronikos II Palaiologos established the metropolis while Patriarch John XIII of Constantinople ordained Theophilus who was of Rus' origin. When Theophilus died in 1329, the Metropolitan of Kiev and all Rus'—Theognostus—succeeded in restoring unity in the Rus' lands by claiming that there were too few Christians in pagan Lithuania. The seat of the Metropolis of Lithuania was left vacant between 1329 and 1355. In the meantime, Theognostus had authority over all Rus' and Lithuania until his own death in 1353. For two years, the see was again vacant. It suited the metropolitans in Moscow to brand the Lithuanians as fire worshippers. Grand Duke Algirdas promoted his candidate Roman for the metropolis of Lithuania. Roman was a monk from Tver and a relative of Algirdas' wife Uliana. Algirdas agreed to cease his support for his previous candidate Teodoryt on the grounds that his ordination was uncanonical, on condition that Roman was also appointed as Metropolitan of All Rus'. Algirdas even promised to convert to Orthodoxy in exchange for the ordination of Roman. In Constantinople, Patriarch Callistus I was deposed and was succeeded by Patriarch Philotheus I of Constantinople (November 1353 – 1354). In 1355, a restored Callistus, in agreement with Philotheus, ordained Roman as Metropolitan of All Rus'.

In 1355, after diplomatic struggles, Patriarch Callistus I of Constantinople united the Metropolis of Halych with the Metropolis of Lithuania under the leadership of Roman. Callistus also confirmed that Alexius remained in possession of the "Metropolis of Kiev and all Rus'". All eparchies of the Halych metropolis were transferred to the jurisdiction of a united "Metropolis of Lithuania-Volhynia" (also known as "Lithuania–Halych").

There were now two metropolitans for all Rus' (see Metropolis of Lithuania-Volhynia below).

==== Metropolis of Halych ====
In 1241, the Kingdom of Galicia-Volhynia was captured by the Mongol army. In 1245, King Daniel of Galicia won a decisive battle over the Hungarian-Polish army of his opponent Rostislav Mikhailovich and united Halychia with Volhynia. After this victory, he built his residence in Kholm in the western part of Volhynia. After Daniel's visit to Batu Khan, he made payments of tribute to the Golden Horde.

In 1299, the Metropolitan of Kiev and all Rus'—Maximus—transferred the metropolitan seat from Kiev to the city of Vladimir-on-Klyazma. In reaction to this move, King Daniel's son and successor on the throne—Leo I—petitioned the Ecumenical Patriarch to erect a new metropolis in the territory of his kingdom. Leo died in 1301 but his son—Yuri I of Galicia—succeeded in securing the charter of establishment from Patriarch Athanasius I of Constantinople with the approval of Emperor Andronikos II Palaiologos.

The first Metropolitan of Halych was Niphont (reigned 1303–1305). Following his death, the see lay vacant for three years. During that time, there were civil struggles with neighbouring realms. A Catholic from the Polish Piast dynasty—Yuri II Boleslav—succeeded to the throne of Halych. In 1308, he nominated Peter of Moscow as Metropolitan of Kiev and all Rus'. In the absence of a hierarch in Halych, Peter was effectively the administrator of that metropolis as well as his own metropolis of Kiev. In 1325, Peter moved his metropolitan seat 200 kilometers (120 mi) to the west from Vladimir to Moscow. The second metropolitan was Gabriel (reigned 1326–1329). From 1329–1337 the see was again vacant. During this period the metropolis was effectively administered by Theognostus of Kiev (as Metropolitan of Kiev and all Rus'). The last metropolitan was Teodore (reigned 1337–1347). Following his death in 1347, the Grand Prince of Moscow—Simeon—conspired with Theognostus of Kiev to convince Emperor John VI Kantakouzenos to disestablish the Halych metropolis. At that time, the Kingdom of Galicia–Volhynia was convulsed by the Galicia–Volhynia Wars which resulted in the kingdom being sundered between the Grand Duchy of Lithuania and the Kingdom of Poland.

==== Metropolis of Lithuania-Volhynia ====
Theognostus of Kiev died in 1353. He was succeeded in the Metropolis of Kiev and all Rus' by Alexius (reigned 1354–1378). In 1355, after diplomatic struggles, a restored Patriarch Callistus I of Constantinople, in agreement with Philotheus, united the Metropolis of Halych with the Metropolis of Lithuania under the leadership of Metropolitan Roman. Callistus also confirmed that Alexius remained in possession of the "Metropolis of Kiev and all Rus'". All eparchies of the Halych metropolis were transferred to the jurisdiction of a united metropolis, which was also known as the "Metropolis of Lithuania-Volhynia".

There were now two metropolitans for all Rus'; the ensuing struggle between them continued until Roman's death in 1362. Initially, Roman won over some bishops. He failed, however, to secure the support of the Bishop of Tver. Both Metropolitans travelled to Constantinople to make their appeals in person. In 1356, their cases were heard by a Patriarchal Synod. The Holy Synod confirmed that Alexius was the Metropolitan of Kiev while Roman was also confirmed in his see at Novogorodek. In 1361, the two sees were formally divided. Shortly afterwards, in the winter of 1361/62, Roman died; at that point, the Lithuanian metropolitanate was effectively dissolved. From 1362 to 1371, the territory of the former metropolises of Halych and of Lithuania were officially lowered to the rank of bishoprics within the Kiev metropolis. These changes, however, did not end the political rivalry for religious influence in Rus'.

==== Metropolis of Kiev and Lithuania ====
The Grand Duke of Lithuania—Algirdas—attacked Muscovy on three occasions between 1368 and 1372 as part of the Lithuanian–Muscovite War. Hostilities between Moscow and Lithuania resumed; in August 1375 Muscovite troops captured Tver. Patriarch Philotheus I agreed to grant the petition to create a separate metropolis in the territory of the Grand Duchy. Philotheus also listened to the petitions of the Eastern Orthodox princes to have Cyprian as their metropolitan. In 1375, Philotheus consecrated Cyprian as "Metropolitan of Kiev and Lithuania". At the Council of Constantinople, it was decided that "upon the death of Alexius, Cyprian should become the Metropolitan of Kiev and all Rus'".

==== Reunification of the Metropolis of Kiev and all Rus' ====
In 1325, the metropolitan seat was moved from Vladimir to Moscow by Metropolitan Peter of Moscow under the instruction of Grand Prince Ivan of Moscow. During the 14th century, the church was de facto split in two or three. Starting from the 15th century, the church was finally reunited and continued to be governed from Moscow by the Metropolitan of Kiev and all Rus.

On 12 February 1376, Alexius died; by the terms of the agreement with the patriarch, Cyprian was entitled to rule the religious affairs of all Rus'. On 6 June 1376, Cyprian arrived at his residence in Kiev. He attempted, but failed, to get recognition of his rights in the whole metropolitan diocese from the Grand Duke of Moscow Dmitri Donskoi, Novgorod, and Pskov. However, in the same year, there was a palace mutiny in Constantinople in which power was usurped by Andronikos IV. The new emperor deposed Patriarch Philotheus and installed Macarius in his stead. Macarius assured Dmitriy of Moscow in writing that he denied Cyprian's claims to the Church of Great Rus. He also offered to send the Grand Duke's nominee—Mitya—to Constantinople for his consecration as metropolitan. Mitya, however, died (1379) within sight of Constantinople. Mitya was accompanied by Pimen. The succeeding Patriarch—Nilus—may have been tricked by Pimen using forged letters into consecrating Pimen in Mitya's place in June 1380.

As a result, Cyprian's rights to the united metropolis was disputed by Pimen (1380–1382). Dmitry, upon hearing the news of Pimen's consecration, angrily swore not to accept Pimen upon his return. Thus Pimen's metropolitanate was contested from the start, and he accomplished little as a result. Cyprian's rights were also disputed by Dionysius (1384–1385). Dionysius died in detention in Kiev on 15 October 15, 1385. After this, Cyprian enjoyed undisputed leadership of the Church throughout the Rus' and Lithuanian lands. He died in 1406.

The Lithuanian masses remained pagan until suddenly, to the surprise of all, Lithuanians, Russians, and Teutonic Knights alike, they were brought to Roman Christianity through royal fiat. In 1387, Algirdas' successor, King Władysław II Jagiełło, converted Lithuania to Catholicism. This marked the beginning of a long period of hardship for the Orthodox Church in western Rus'.

In 1414, Grand Duke Vytautas attempted to re-establish the Metropolis of Lithuania. He arranged for a synod of bishops to elect Gregory Tsamblak as the Metropolitan of Lithuania. The consecration took place without the consent of Patriarch Euthymius II of Constantinople and was not recognized in Moscow.

== Union of Florence ==
An Ecumenical council of the Catholic Church—the Council of Florence—took place from 1431 to 1449. Although he resisted at first, the Grand Prince of Moscow—Vasily II of Moscow—eventually permitted the Metropolitan of Kiev and all Rus— Isidore of Kiev—to attend the council. Isidore, who was of Greek origin, submitted to the articles of the Bull of Union with the Greeks which united the Orthodox Church in Russia with the Latin Church. In 1443, the Florentine Union was condemned by the Orthodox Churches (Patriarchate of Alexandria, Patriarchate of Antioch and Patriarchate of Jerusalem) at the Cathedral of Jerusalem. These events caused a crisis in the metropolis.

=== Parallel successions ===
The Great Prince of Moscow voided the union and imprisoned Isidore for some time. He then appointed his own candidate as metropolitan—Jonah. Since this appointment was not approved by Constantinople, Jonah unilaterally changed his title to "Metropolitan of Moscow and all Russia" in 1448. From that date until 1589, sixteen hierarchs with that title were locally appointed without being recognised by the Ecumenical Patriarch of Constantinople.

Notwithstanding, the Ecumenical Patriarch continued to appoint metropolitans for the united Catholic and Eastern Orthodox ("Uniate") dioceses in those Ruthenian lands that were not controlled by the Tsardom of Moscow. In the Polish and Lithuanian lands, the next uniate hierarch was Gregory the Bulgarian. He was consecrated by a Latin Patriarch of Constantinople. In 1469, his appointment was also approved by the Ecumenical Patriarch of Constantinople—Dionysius I. The episcopal see of the new hierarch was located in Vilnius, the capital of the Grand Duchy of Lithuania. With the appointment of Gregory, the title was changed to Metropolitan of Kiev, Galicia and all Rus' (Ukrainian: Митрополит Київський, Галицький, та всієї Русі, romanized: Mytropolyt Kyivskyi, Halytskyi, ta vsiiei Rusi). In 1569, the Union of Lublin created a single state, the Polish–Lithuanian Commonwealth, one of the largest countries in Europe at the time. It replaced the personal union of the Crown of the Kingdom of Poland and the Grand Duchy of Lithuania with a real union and an elective monarchy. After that, the life of the Orthodox Church became much more complicated since Catholic clergy and gentry were more numerous and more powerful. Internally, the Orthodox Church was beset with accusations of simony and digamy.

== From the Union of Florence to the Union of Brest ==
=== Patriarchate of Moscow and all Rus' ===
At the end of the 16th century, two eastern patriarchs visited Ruthenia. First to arrive in 1586 was the Patriarch of Antioch—Joachim VI. Having become acquainted with the situation, he granted the Lviv Dormition Brotherhood the rights of stauropegia. At the same time, the patriarch appointed Bishop Cyril Terlecki of Lutsk as his exarch in the metropolis. When traveling across eastern Europe from 1588 to 1589, Patriarch Jeremias II of Constantinople visited Moscow. He confirmed the autocephaly of the Eastern Orthodox Church in Russia. For the first time since 1448, an Ecumenical Patriarch consecrated a metropolitan in Rus' lands—Job of Moscow—as the Patriarch of Moscow and all Rus'.

=== Metropolis of Kiev, Galicia and all Ruthenia ===
When he arrived in the Commonwealth, Jeremias II also supported the Orthodox fraternities and deposed the digamist, Metropolitan Onesiphorus. In his place, he appointed the Archimandrite of Minsk Monastery—Michael Rohoza as Metropolitan of Kiev, Galicia and all Rus'. This confirmed the effective territorial division of the Eastern Orthodox Church in the former Kievan Rus'.

The Bishop of Lviv—Hedeon Balaban—took part in negotiations over union with the Roman Catholic Church on 1590. However, he later joined with Prince Kostiantyn Ostrozky at the Council of Brest in 1596 in opposition to union. He maintained this position until his death.In December 1594, Bishop Cyril Terlecki, on behalf of the Ruthenian episcopate, announced that the Orthodox Church intended to transfer the ecclesiastical jurisdiction of the Church from the Ecumenical Patriarchate of Constantinople to the jurisdiction of the Holy See. This union was conditional on Church retaining the Byzantine Rite and the ancient rights of the Church. In December 1595, representatives of the Ruthenian Church in Rome signed the terms of union with the Catholic Church. The terms permitted them to retain the Byzantine rite, the Julian calendar, the right to elect a metropolitan and bishops, the Orthodox church calendar, the lower clergy had the right to marry, and so on. On 6 October 1596, in Brest, Metropolitan Rogoza convened a council attended by bishops, archimandrites, priests and laity. The Union of Brest was proclaimed at the cathedral. Most of the bishops and nobility supported the union. On the other hand, many priests, monasteries, Cossacks and burghers opposed the union. Immediately after the council, Metropolitan Rogoza deprived two bishops who opposed the Union of their sees: Bishop Balaban of Lviv and Bishop Mykhailo Kopystensky of Przemyśl. Prince Konstantin-Vasyl Ostrozky also did not support the union. In addition, the Lviv Brotherhood, as a stauropegia that was directly subordinate to the Patriarch of Constantinople, initially opposed the Union. Bishop Balaban became the exarch of the patriarch for Orthodox Ukrainians. The Kiev and Vilnius fraternities actively declared themselves, and Orthodox fraternities began to operate in Mogilev, Minsk, Lublin, Lutsk, and other cities. Most monasteries, including: Kyiv-Pechersk, Vydubychi, Epiphany, St. The Trinity in Vilno, Pochaiv, and others also did not support the union. But officially the eparchies of Kiev, Volodymyr-Volyn, Turoŭ-Pinsk, Lutsk, Chełm and Polatsk accepted the Union.

This had the effect of creating the Ruthenian Uniate Church which later became known as the Ukrainian Greek Catholic Church. With the Union of Uzhhorod, dioceses in Transylvania and Hungary also joined the Ruthenian Uniate Church.

==== Exarchate of Ukraine ====
As with the previous Florentine union, the Union of Brest was not accepted by all orthodox clergymen causing some eparchies (dioceses) to continue their loyalty to Constantinople. In 1620 the Greek Orthodox Patriarch of Jerusalem Theophanes consecrated Job Boretsky as the new Metropolitan of Kiev, Galicia and all Ruthenia and the Exarch of Ukraine. This appointment revitalized Eastern Orthodox churches and deepened the schism.

== See also ==
- Bishop of Kyiv (disambiguation)

== Sources ==
- Majeska, George P. (1984). Russian Travelers to Constantinople in the Fourteenth and Fifteenth Centuries. Dumbarton Oaks. ISBN 0-88402-101-7.
- Meyendorff, John (1989). Byzantium and The Rise of Russia. Crestwood, New York: St. Vladimir's Seminary.
- Rowell, S. C. (1994). Lithuania Ascending: A Pagan Empire Within East-Central Europe, 1295–1345. Cambridge Studies in Medieval Life and Thought: Fourth Series. Cambridge University Press. ISBN 978-0-521-45011-9.
