= Dionysius, Metropolitan of Kiev =

Dionysius
- Metropolitan of Kiev and all Rus'
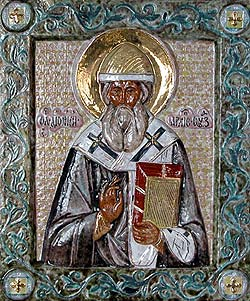
- Icon of Dionysius
- Church: Russian Orthodox Church
- See: Moscow
- Installed: 1384
- Term ended: 1385
- Predecessor: Pimen, Metropolitan of Moscow
- Successor: Cyprian, Metropolitan of Kiev

Personal details
- Born: c. 1300
- Died: 15 October 1385

Saint Dionysius I (Russian: Дионисий, romanized: Dionisy; secular name: David; c. 1300 – 15 October 1385) was the metropolitan of the Russian Orthodox Church from 1384 to 1385.

== Life ==
A native of the Principality of Kiev, David entered the Kiev Caves Lavra as young man, where he was tonsured a hieromonk and given the religious name Dionysius. He is known to have spent a number of years living in a cave that he dug out himself on the banks of the Volga River not far from Nizhny Novgorod. Later, Dionysius founded the Pechersky Monastery on that same spot, which was dedicated in honour of the Ascension of the Lord. In 1374, he was consecrated as the bishop of Suzdal and won love and respect on the part of the locals.

In 1378, Dionysius was recommended as the Metropolitan by Sergius of Radonezh after the death of Metropolitan Alexius. However, Grand Prince Dmitri Donskoi had his own candidate – a priest by the name of Mikhail (Mityaya). Dionysius was one of a number of bishops at the council who opposed Mikhail, who was suspected of heresy (strigolniki). If elected, Mikhail wanted to introduce a new way of enthroning the Metropolitan at home, in Russia, rather than traveling to Constantinople to be installed by the ecumenical patriarch (at the time, Russia did not have an autocephalous church). In 1379, Dionysius went to Constantinople carrying a protest against the choice of Mikhail addressed to the Patriarch. Mikhail was afraid that Dionysius would get the patriarch's blessing and followed him to Constantinople. However, Mikhail died on his way there and one of his accompanying clergymen, Archmandrite Pimen, reached Constantinople before Dionysius and was named as the metropolitan in place of Mikhail.

In 1382, Dionysius received the title of archbishop from the patriarch, who was impressed with his piety and humility. In 1383, Dionysius returned from this long journey to his congregation at Suzdal and continued his struggle against the strigolniki. He also implored Dmitri Donskoi against Pimen, whom he viewed as a usurper, since no one in the Russian Church, not even the grand prince himself, had been consulted before Pimen was appointed as metropolitan. In 1384, Dionysius was sent back to Constantinople to ask for Pimen's deposition and his own appointment as metropolitan. Patriarch Neilus Kerameus was not sure whether he could trust Dionysius and sent two metropolitans to Moscow, who were supposed to depose Pimen and install the archbishop of Suzdal. On his way back to Moscow, Dionysius stopped in Kiev, where he was detained by the Kievan prince Vladimir Olgerdovich at the insistence of Cyprian, the archbishop of Kiev, who was to have succeeded as the metropolitan of Moscow in 1378 upon the death of Alexius, but who was not finally welcomed into Moscow until 1390. Dionysius died in detention on 15 October 1385. He was buried in the Caves of St. Anthony at Kiev, in the monastery in which he began his spiritual life.

== Veneration ==
The Russian Orthodox Church used to celebrate his feast day on 19 July, but subsequently this tradition died down. He is now commemorated on 15 October according to the traditional Julian calendar (28 October in the modern Gregorian calendar), where he is listed as "Metropolitan of Suzdal", since he was never able to take possession of his metropolitan see.

== Sources ==
- Печников, М. В. (2007). "Дионисий". Православная энциклопедия — Т. 15: Димитрий — Дополнения к "Актам Историческим". Православная энциклопедия. pp. 241–246. ISBN 978-5-89572-026-4.

Eastern Orthodox Church titles
Preceded by Pimen	Metropolitan of Kiev in Moscow	Succeeded by Cyprian (restored)
