= Poemenius =

Poemenius (Ancient Greek: Ποιμένιος, romanized: Poimenios) is a given name of Greek origin. Derived from ποιμήν, 'shepherd', the name means "pastoral, rural, simple". The standard Latin form is Pimenius, whence Pimenio and Pymenio in Romance. The attested feminine form is Poemenia. The Russian version is Pimen (Пи́мен, Пими́н).

Bearers of the name include:

- Poemenius (mythology), one of the leaders of the satyrs in Greek mythology
- Poemenius (usurper), Roman usurper based in Trier in 353
- Saint Pimenius, Christian martyred in Rome in 362
- Poemen (c. 350–450), one of the Desert Fathers, called Abba Poemen or Poemen the Great
- Pimenio (fl. 629–646), bishop of Assidonia
- Pimen, Metropolitan of Kiev, called Pimen the Greek, metropolitan in Moscow from 1382 to 1384
- Patriarch Pimen I of Moscow, (1910–1990), head of the Russian Orthodox Church
- Pimen Orlov (1812–1865), Russian painter
