= Theognostus of Kiev =

- Metropolitan of Kiev and all Rus'
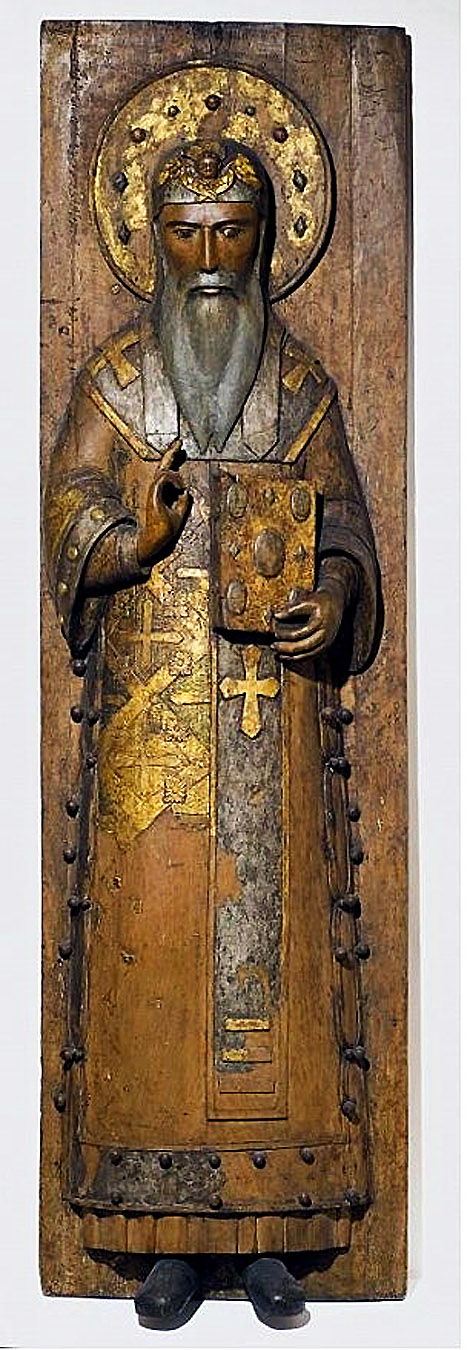
- Tombstone wooden frame with the figure of Theognost,17th century
- Church: Russian Orthodox Church
- See: Moscow
- Installed: 1328
- Term ended: 1353
- Predecessor: Peter
- Successor: Alexius

Theognostus (Russian: Феогност, romanized: Feognost; died 11 March 1353) was a bishop of the Ecumenical Patriarch of Constantinople who served as Metropolitan of Kiev and all Rus'.

== Life ==
Theognostus was born in Constantinople and later in his life became Peter's successor as Metropolitan of Kiev and all Rus'. He chose Moscow as his primary seat after he had lived for several years in Volodymyr in Volhynia.

It was his lot to reconcile Novgorod with the Grand Duchy of Moscow in times of their mutual animosity. Theognostus managed to save all of the Russian churches' valuables and gave up all his personal property after he had refused to collect tribute from the churches in favor of the Golden Horde. He was tortured by the Tatars for such audacity. It was the Khan who finally gave up and confirmed the existing privileges of the Russian Orthodox Church. After a fire swept through Moscow, Theognostus started to restore the churches.

In 1353, feeling that his days were numbered, Theognostus recommended Alexius (Bishop of Vladimir) his successor. Theognostus was buried in the Cathedral of the Dormition in Moscow. He was canonized by the Russian Orthodox Church in the 19th century.

Eastern Orthodox Church titles
Preceded by Peter	Metropolitan of Kiev and all Rus' (Ecumenical Patriarch of Constantinople); 1328–1353	Succeeded by Alexius (seat in Moscow); Theodorite (seat in Kiev)
