= Peter of Moscow =

Russian bishop and saint

- Metropolitan of Kiev and all Rus'
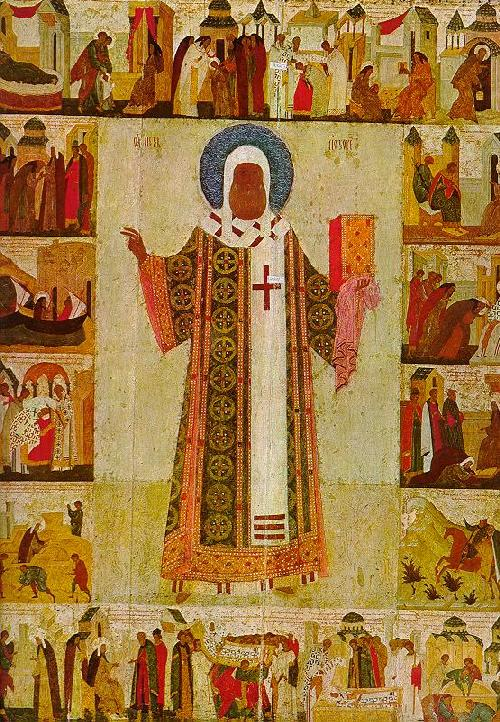
- Metropolitan Peter, with Scenes from His Life, 15th-century icon by Dionisius
- Church: Russian Orthodox Church
- See: Moscow
- Installed: 1308
- Term ended: 1326
- Predecessor: Maximos
- Successor: Theognostus

Peter of Moscow (Russian: Пётр Московский, Peter of Kiev, Peter of Rata, Russian: Пётр Ратенский, Ukrainian: Петро Ратенський; c. 1260 – 20 December 1326) was an Eastern Orthodox bishop of Kiev, who moved his see from Vladimir to Moscow in 1325. Later he was proclaimed a patron saint of Moscow. In spite of the move, the office remained officially entitled "Metropolitan of Kiev and all Rus'" until the autocephalous election of Jonah in 1448.

== Life ==
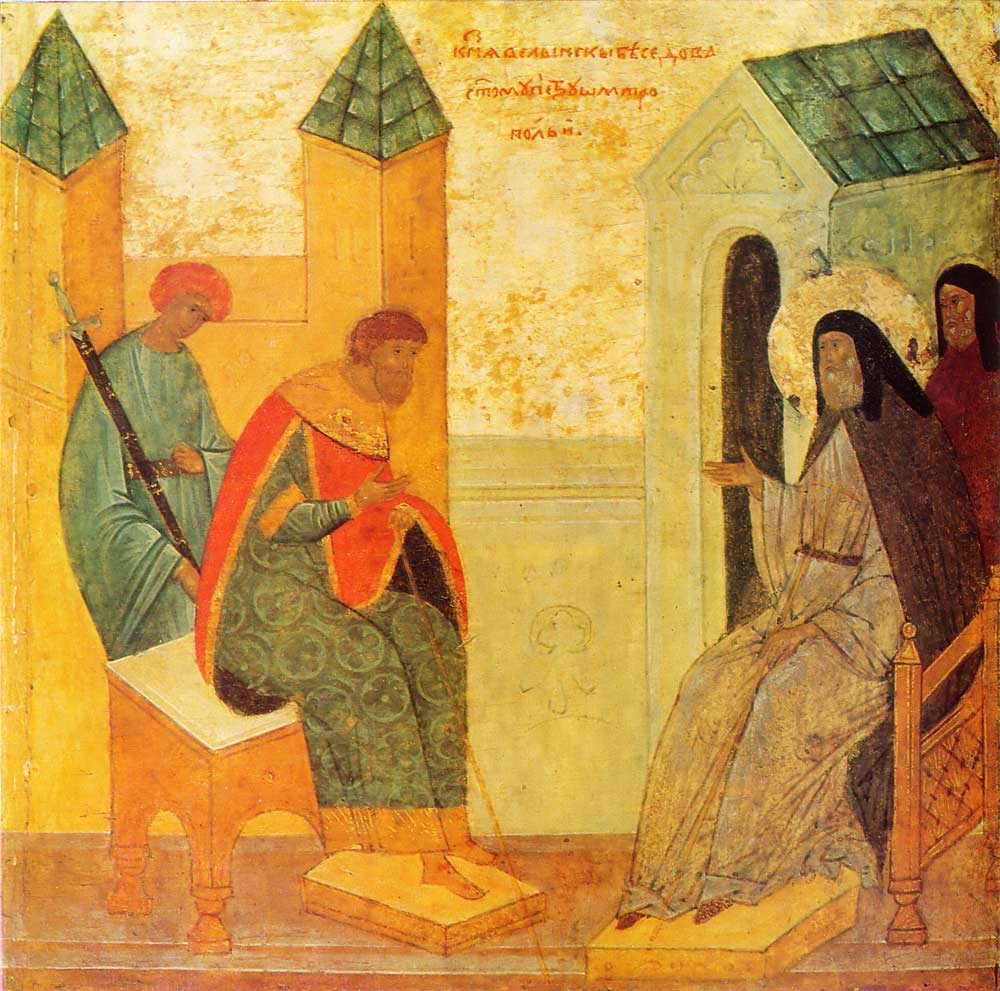
Yuri Lvovych of Galicia nominating Peter as metropolitan, depiction from late 15th century

Saint Peter of Moscow
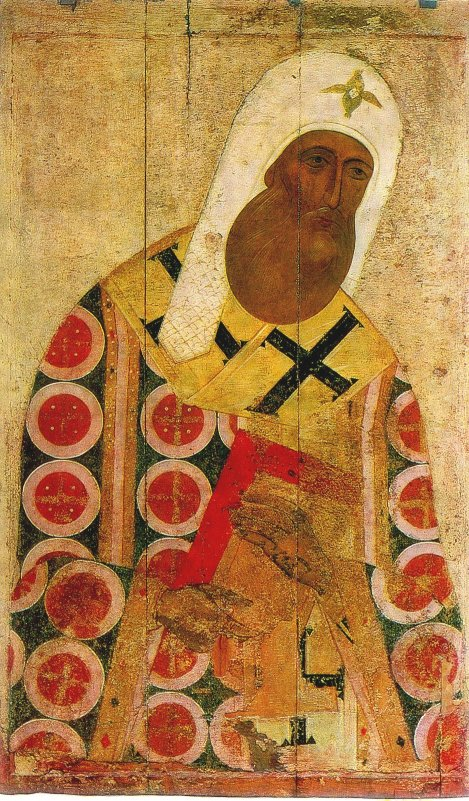
- 15th-century Russian Icon of Metropolitan Saint Peter of Moscow

Confessor and Wonderworker
- Born: c. 1260; Volhynia, Kingdom of Galicia–Volhynia
- Died: 21 December 1326 (aged 66); Moscow, Grand Duchy of Moscow
- Venerated in: Eastern Orthodoxy
- Canonized: 1339 by Metropolitan Alexis of Kiev
- Major shrine: Cathedral of the Dormition, Moscow, Russia
- Feast: 5 October; 24 August (Translation of his relics); 21 December (Day of repose in 1326)
- Patronage: Moscow

Peter was born in Volhynia (part of the Kingdom of Galicia–Volhynia). His parents were Theodore and Eupraxia. At the age of twelve, young Peter entered a monastery where he learned iconography. The igumen of the monastery had Peter ordained as a hieromonk. After years of ascetic labors at the monastery, the hieromonk Peter, with the blessing of the igumen, left the monastery in search of a solitary place.

He built a cell at the Rata River and began to pursue asceticism in silence. Afterwards, at the place of his ascetic exploits, a monastery was formed, called the Novodvorsk. The Icon of the Most Holy Theotokos “Of St Peter” was so called because it was painted by Peter while he was igumen of the Ratsk monastery near Volhynia. During a visit to the Ratne monastery by Maximus, Metropolitan of Kiev and all Rus', Peter gave him the icon as a gift.

In 1308 king Yuri I of Galicia nominated and the Patriarch of Constantinople appointed Peter to the vacant see of Kiev and all Rus'. Mikhail Yaroslavich, Grand Prince of Vladimir and Tver, wanted to advance his own candidate for this position. Peter's nomination caused prolonged animosity between Mikhail and Peter to the point that the latter had to ask for protection from the Prince of Moscow in 1325.

Peter travelled to Constantinople where Patriarch Athanasius consecrated him as Metropolitan of Rus and bestowed on him the hierarchal vestments, staff and icon. Upon his return to Rus' in 1308, Metropolitan Peter arrived at Kiev after a year, and then proceeded on to Vladimir. During this time of Tatar (Mongol) authority Rus was in turmoil, and Peter was often obliged to change the place of his residence.

Peter transferred his metropolitan duties from depopulated Kiev to Vladimir. In 1325 Metropolitan Peter, at the request of the Grand Prince of Moscow, Ivan Kalita, transferred the metropolitan cathedra-chair from Vladimir to Moscow as part of Ivan's relocation. The move strengthened the political position of Moscow and established it as the spiritual capital of fragmented Rus. After Peter's move to Moscow, the Cathedral of the Dormition and several other stone churches were built by Ivan Kalita in the Moscow Kremlin. The foundation of the Vysokopetrovsky Monastery in Moscow is ascribed to Peter. He also authored a few sermons and epistles.

Peter died on 21 December 1326. After his canonization by Metropolitan Alexis, his veneration was propagated all over Moscovy. Accordingly, many churches were dedicated to Peter the Metropolitan in Moscow and other cities of Russia. His feast day is celebrated on 24 August (the translation of his relics to the Dormition Cathedral in Moscow), 5 October (in common with Metropolitans Jonah and Alexis), and the 21st of December (the date of his repose).

Eastern Orthodox Church titles
Preceded by Maximus	Metropolitan of Kiev and all Rus' (With its see in Moscow)	Succeeded by Theognostus of Kiev
