= Alexius, Metropolitan of Kiev =

Metropolitan of Moscow from 1354 to 1378

- Metropolitan of Kiev and all Rus'
- Church: Russian Orthodox Church
- See: Moscow
- Installed: 1354
- Term ended: 1378
- Predecessor: Theognostus
- Successor: Cyprian

Saint Alexius
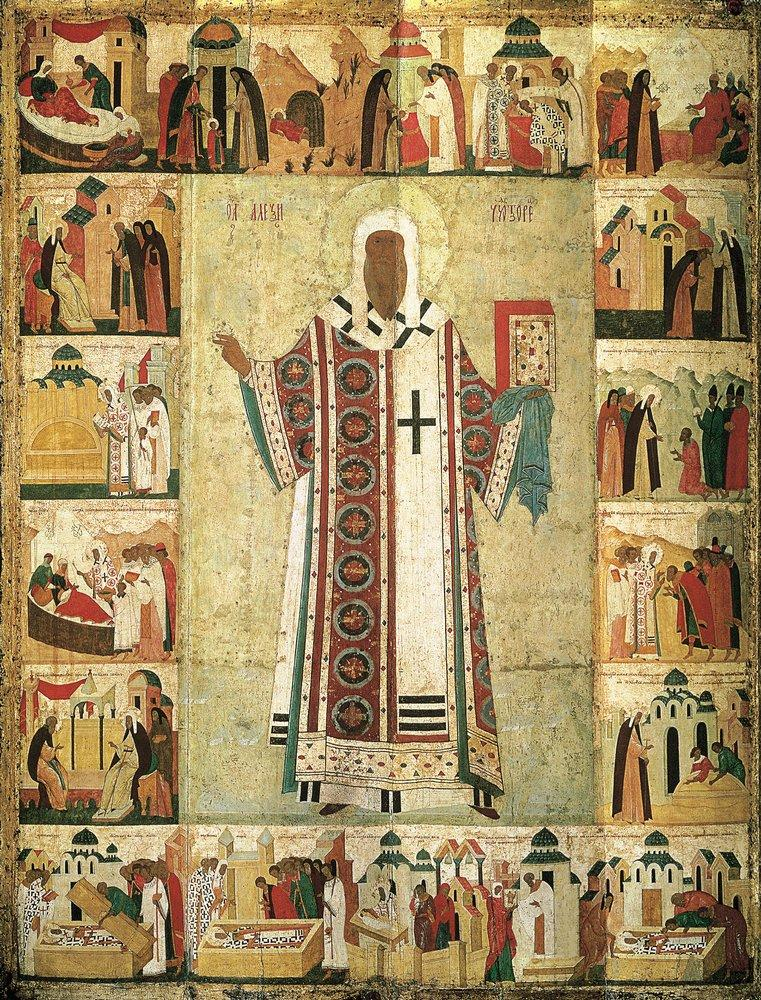
- Icon of St. Alexis with scenes from his life by Dionisius

Metropolitan of Kiev
- Born: c. 1296; Moscow
- Died: 1378
- Venerated in: Russian Orthodox Church
- Canonized: 1448
- Major shrine: Chudov Monastery
- Feast: 12 February
- Attributes: Vested wearing bishop's omophorion and patriarch's koukoulion. Sometimes holding a Gospel Book with his right hand raised in blessing
- Patronage: Moscow

Alexius (Russian: Алексий, Aleksii; before 1296–1378) was Metropolitan of Kiev and all Rus' from 1354. He presided over the Muscovite government during Dmitrii Donskoi's minority.

== Biography ==
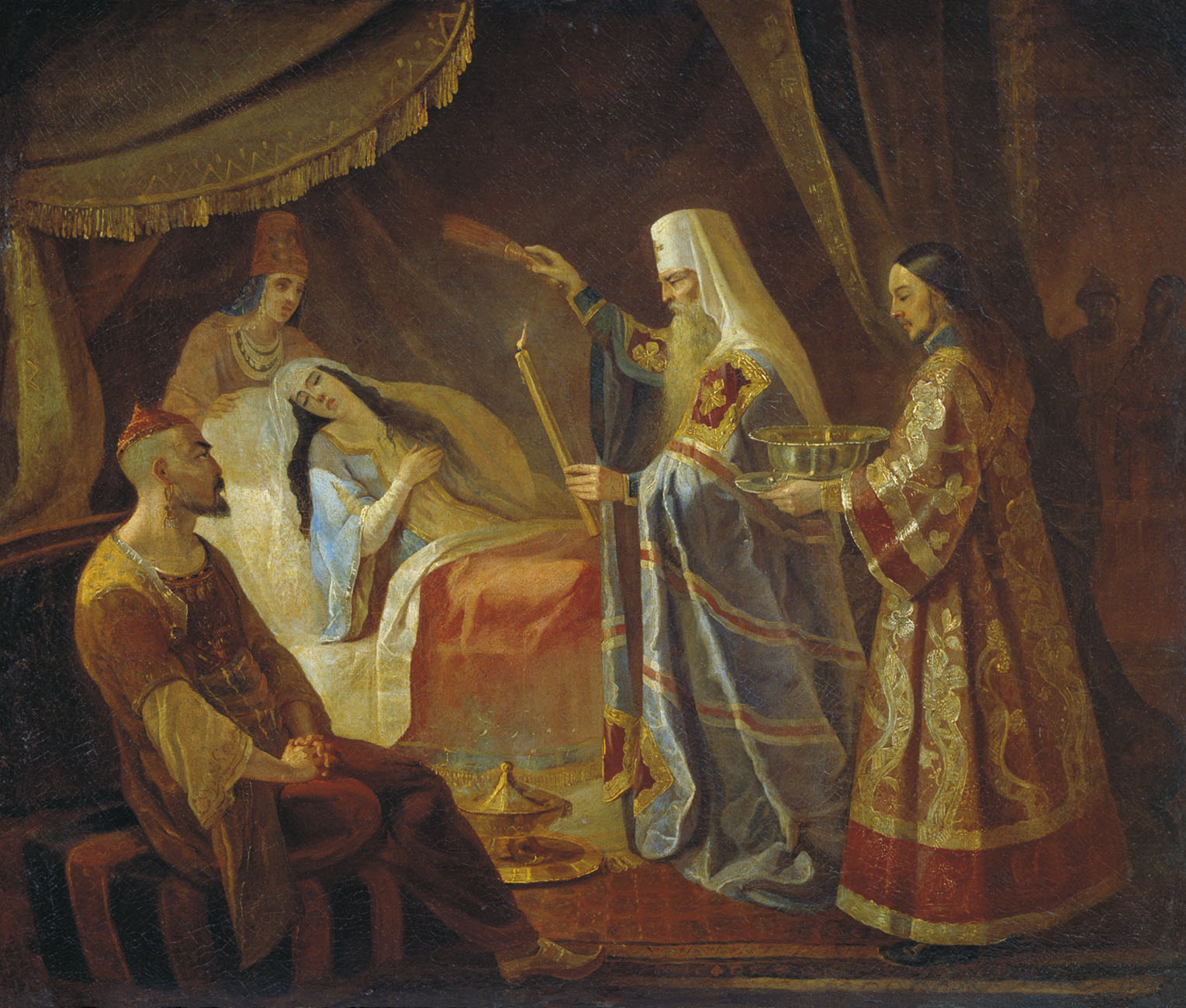
Metropolitan Alexis Healing the Tatar Queen Taidula from Blindness, Yakov Kapkov

Alexius, whose name at birth was Eleutherius, was a son of Феодор (Theodore) Biakont and Mary, his father was a boyar from Chernigov who settled in Moscow and founded the Pleshcheev boyar family. He took monastic vows at the Epiphany Monastery of Moscow around 1313, at which time he was given the religious name of Alexius. In 1333 or so, he joined the household of Metropolitan Theognostus. In 1340, Alexius was appointed the metropolitan's deputy in Vladimir and twelve years later was consecrated as Bishop of Vladimir.

By the will of Symeon the Proud, Alexius was appointed adviser to his brothers – Ivan and Andrew. After visiting Constantinople, he was chosen to become the Metropolitan of Kiev and all Rus' in 1354. When Dmitry Donskoy and Vladimir the Bold were young, Alexius was their spiritual tutor and served as regent at the same time. He took the side of Dmitrii Donskoi in his struggle against Tver and Nizhny Novgorod, where he once sent Sergius of Radonezh to suspend service in churches and monasteries, until the political strife was over.

In 1357, Alexius was summoned by Jani Beg, the Khan of the Golden Horde, to cure his mother Taydula Khatun of blindness. The metropolitan's success is held to have prevented a Tatar raid on Moscow.

In 1360s, Alexius founded the Andronikov, Chudov, and Alekseyevsky monasteries. He promoted Metropolitan Peter's canonization by the Russian Orthodox Church. Shortly before his death, Alexius fruitlessly tried to convince Sergius of Radonezh to become his successor. Alexius was an author of a number of sermons and epistles. He was canonized by the Russian Orthodox Church in 1448 and is revered as one of the patron saints of Moscow.

== Feast days ==
12 February, (the day of his repose), 20 May, (the day of the uncovering of his relics) and 5 October, (Synaxis of the Hierarchs of Moscow). His relics are venerated in Ephiphany Cathedral in Elokhovo.

== Popular culture ==
The 2012 film The Horde is a highly fictionalised narrative of how Alexius healed Taidula from blindness.

Eastern Orthodox Church titles
Preceded by Theognostus	Metropolitan of Kiev and all Rus' (Ecumenical Patriarchate of Constantinople)	Succeeded by Cyprian
