= Yuriy Pohulyaiko =

Ukrainian politician

- Юрій Погуляйко
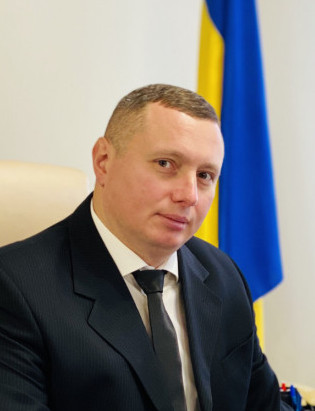

Governor of Volyn Oblast
- In office 2 December 2019 – 8 November 2024
- Preceded by: Oleksandr Kyrychuk (acting)
- Succeeded by: Ivan Rudnytsky

Personal details
- Born: Yuriy Mykhailovych Pohulyaiko; 12 November 1978 (age 47) Verkhnoshevyrivka, Krasnodon Raion, Luhansk Oblast, Soviet Union (now Ukraine)

Yuriy Mykhailovych Pohulyaiko (Ukrainian: Юрій Михайлович Погуляйко; born on 12 November 1978) is a Ukrainian politician, lawyer, and civil servant, who has served as the Governor of Volyn Oblast from 2019 to 2024.

== Biography ==
Yuriy Pohulyaiko was born on 12 November 1978 in the Luhansk Oblast in Eastern Ukraine.

=== Education ===
He graduated from Luhansk State Agrarian University as a manager of organizations and enterprises, Interregional Academy of Personnel Management (lawyer), Academy of Management of the Ministry of Internal Affairs (lawyer).

=== Employment ===
Puhulyaiko worked as a district police inspector, detective officer of the branch of the State Service for Combating Economic Crime of the Krasnodon city department of the Ministry of Internal Affairs of Ukraine in the Luhansk Oblast. He served in the positions of privates and commanding officers in the internal affairs bodies of the Ministry of Internal Affairs of Ukraine in the Mykolaiv, Dnipropetrovsk, Chernihiv and Luhansk Oblats, then in the National Police.

He served in the tax police of the Main Department of the SFS of Donetsk region. Pohulyaiko held the position of First Deputy Head of the Luhansk Regional State Administration, since 22 August 2019.

On 30 October 2019, at an extraordinary session, members of the Volyn Oblast Council approved an appeal to the President of Ukraine, in which they disagreed with the personnel decision of the Cabinet of Ministers of Ukraine to approve the appointment of Pohulyaiko as the Governor of Volyn Oblast. He was appointed and took office on 2 December.

=== Criticism ===
On 9 April 2020, the Svoboda faction in the Volyn Oblast Council criticized some public officials in the council, including Pohulyaiko, for using Russian in their duties, which they claim is in violation of the Ukrainian constitution and a 2019 law protecting Ukrainian as the state language.

== Personal life ==
He is married and has two children.
