= Oleksandr Kyrychuk =

Ukrainian politician

- Олександр Киричук

Governor of Volyn Oblast (acting)
- In office 11 June 2019 – 2 December 2019
- Preceded by: Oleksandr Savchenko
- Succeeded by: Yuriy Pohulyaiko

Personal details
- Born: Oleksandr Oleksiyovych Kyrychuk; 2 July 1973 (age 52) Lutsk, Ukraine, Soviet Union

Olexandr Oleksiyovych Kyrychuk (Ukrainian: Олександр Олексійович Киричук; born on 2 July 1973), is a Ukrainian politician, businessman, and activist, who had served as the acting Governor of Volyn Oblast from 11 June 2019 to 2 December 2019.

== Biography ==
Oleksandr Kyrychuk was born on 2 July 1973.

In 1991, he graduated from the Lutsk Cooperative Training and Production Complex "Vocational School", the organization of cooperative trade, commodity science of consumer goods, commodity expert-organizer.

From August 1995 to May 2004, he was an entrepreneur.

From May 2004 to January 2007, he was an Assistant Consultant to Continuum-Ukr-Resource LLC in Lutsk.

From February 2006 to July 2016, he was a part-time director of Tarles LLC.

From February 2007 to March 2009, he was the 1st Deputy Director of Zakhidbud Industry LLC.

From March 2009 to April 2011 he was the Commercial Director of Euroton LLC.

In April and May 2011, he was the deputy director of the state utility company "Lutskteplo" Volyn region.

In 2011 he graduated from Kyiv National University of Trade and Economics, marketing, as a marketing specialist.

From June 2011 to December 2014, he was the Director of the state utility company "Lutskteplo" in Volyn Oblast, when on 31 December, he was dismissed by the order of the Mayor of Lutsk Mykola Romanyuk, appointing Artur Vasylevsky as the acting director.

From December 2014 to October 2015, he was temporarily out of work.

On 25 February 2015, Kyrychuk plans to file a lawsuit demanding his reinstatement as director of the company.

On 1 March 2015, employees of Lutskteplo gathered near the Lutsk City District Court, to hear Kyrychuk's case of reinstatement to protest against his reinstatement.

On 18 March 2015, Kyrychuk filed a lawsuit proving that his dismissal is illegal, and demanded to reinstate him in office and collect the salary, which he has already accrued ₴33,000. According to the plaintiff, this amount has already accrued to him since 2 January 2015.

On 1 April 2015, Kyrychuk withdrew the lawsuit. According to Ihor Petruk, a lawyer with Lutskteplo, said that ₴33,000 should be collected not from the company but from Mayor Romanyuk who fired Kyrychuk. The plaintiff's lawyer, Viktor Pylypchuk, tried to prove that the dismissal was illegal and that the mayor had acted illegally. Pylypchuk motivated his statement by the fact that the employees of the enterprise physically resisted Kyrychuk and did not let him into the enterprise. Hours later, Kyrychuk dropped the lawsuit. Pylypchuk could not explain the reasons for his client's decision, but the parties can still appeal the court's decision.

On 13 May 2015, the court initially ruled to impose a fine of ₴510 on Kyrychuk, but ruled that he won an appeal.

From October 2015 to May 2016, he was the Project Manager of management and functional executors of Ukravtogaz Regional Production Department of Kyivavtogaz.

On 27 December 2015, a Kyrychuk was arrested by the Ukrainian police as they noticed a Skoda Superb parked in front of the pedestrian crossing in front of the Ukraina Hotel. The police decided to find out the reason for the driver's stop, but then immediately noticed that he was drunk.

On 26 January 2016, Kyrychuk was charged of drunk driving and was on trial by the Lutsk City District Court. However, Judge Alla Bornos decided to psotpone the case.

From May to July 2016, he was an advisor to the staff of the regional production department of Lvivavtogaz.

In 2016, he graduated from the private higher educational institution "Academy of Recreational Technologies and Law", higher school pedagogy, teacher of universities and higher educational institutions, teacher of vocational school, professional in innovation.

From July 2016 to July 2018, he became the director of Tarles LLC. On 21 April 2018, according to the Governor of Volyn Oblast, Oleksandr Savchenko, Kyrychuk stated that he would nominate Kyrychuk and Facebook blogger, Denis Pyatyhorets as deputy governors. In the past, he ran unsuccessfully for the Lutsk City Council.

From July to November 2018, he was again temporarily out of work.

In November 2018, Kyrychuk became the First Deputy Head of the Volyn Regional State Administration, serving under Governor of Volyn Oblast, Oleksandr Savchenko.

On 11 June 2019, Kyrychuk was the acting Governor of Volyn Oblast. As governor, on 30 July, he visited to the Lyuboml Region, where he discussed with local authorities the problem of landfills near the border.

On 2 December 2019, Kyrychuk was replaced by Yuiry Pohulyaiko.
