= Roman Karpyuk =

Ukrainian teacher and politician (1964–2022)

Deputy Chairman of the Volyn Oblast Council
- In office 27 March 2014 – 9 January 2022

Member of the Volyn Oblast Council
- In office 2010 – 9 January 2022

Personal details
- Born: Roman Petrovych Karpyuk; 31 January 1964 Shklyn, Volyn Oblast, Ukrainian SSR, Soviet Union
- Died: 9 January 2022 (aged 57)
- Party: Batkivshchyna

Roman Petrovych Karpyuk (Ukrainian: Роман Петрович Карпюк; 31 January 1964 – 9 January 2022) was a Ukrainian politician. A member of the Batkivshchyna party and later the Strength and Honor party after 2020, he served as deputy chairman of the Volyn Oblast Council from 2014 to 2022.

== Early life ==
Karpyuk was born on 31 January 1964 in Shklyn, which was then part of the Ukrainian SSR in the Soviet Union. In 1985, he graduated from the Lesya Ukrainka Volyn National University with a degree in physical education, qualifying him to be a teacher in physical education in secondary schools. Afterwards, he completed his mandatory conscription in the Soviet Armed Forces, before working as a coach and teacher in secondary schools in Volyn and Lutsk. In 1997, he transitioned into being the Chairman of the Board for the spports club "Olimpia". He then taught at the Lutsk Biotechnical Institute of ISTU as its Dean of Faculty.

From 2000 to 2002 he was the Head of the Lutsk Representative Office of the Open International University of Human Development "Ukraine". Then, from 2002 to 2004, he was the rector of the Lutsk branch of the university. He was also from 2014 to 2015 Rector of the Academy of Recreational Technologies and Law. He was later appointed the head of the Volyn branch of the National Olympic Committee of Ukraine.

== Political career ==
From March 2014 to 2022 he was the Deputy Chairman of the Volyn Oblast Council, first representing Batkivshchyna and later Strength and Honour (after 2020).

== Personal life ==
Karpyuk competed in competitive sport fishing, taking part in multiple competitions in Volyn. He died on 9 January 2022, at the age of 57 during a local sports competition.
