= Alexander Petrovsky =

Alexander Petrovsky may refer

- Metropolitan Alexander, a metropolitan of Kiev, Ukrainian Exarchate
- Fictional character from Sex and the City played by Latvian actor Mikhail Baryshnikov
