= Ukrainian Orthodox Church (Moscow Patriarchate) =

Church in Ukraine

- Emblem
- Classification: Christian
- Orientation: Eastern Orthodox
- Primate: Metropolitan Onufriy
- Bishops: 114 (53 governing)
- Clerics: 12,551 (2022)
- Nuns: 2,727
- Parishes: 8,097 (May 2024)
- Monastics: 4,620 (2022)
- Monasteries: 161 (2022)
- Language: Church Slavonic, Ukrainian, Russian, Romanian
- Liturgy: Byzantine Rite
- Territory: Ukraine
- Origin: 988 (establishment of the Metropolitanate of Kyiv); 1990 (self-rule within the Moscow Patriarchate)
- Recognition: 27 May 2022 (Note: On 27 May 2022 the church claimed it had amended its status to "testify to the full independence and autonomy of the Ukrainian Orthodox Church". Recognized by the Patriarchate of Constantinople as part of the Russian Orthodox Church.); 24 March 2023 (Note: Recognized by Patriarch Ilia II of Georgia as separate from the Russian Orthodox Church on 24 March 2023.)
- Members: 6% of the Ukrainian Orthodox population (Note: March 2022, study by Info Sapiens; 4% of the entire population of Ukraine.)
- Official website: church.ua; uoc-news.church

The Ukrainian Orthodox Church (UOC), (Note: Ukrainian: Українська православна церква, УПЦ, romanized: Ukrainska pravoslavna tserkva, UPTs; Russian: Украинская православная церковь, УПЦ, romanized: Ukrainskaya pravoslavnaya tserkov', UPTs) commonly referred to by the exonym Ukrainian Orthodox Church of the Moscow Patriarchate (UOC-MP), (Note: Russian: Украинская православная церковь Московского патриархата, УПЦ-МП, romanized: Ukrainskaya pravoslavnaya tserkov' Moskovskovo patriarkhata, UPTs-MP) is an Eastern Orthodox church in Ukraine.

The Ukrainian Orthodox Church was officially formed in 1990 as the successor to the Ukrainian Exarchate of the Russian Orthodox Church (ROC) as the Ukrainian branch of the ROC.

On 27 May 2022, following a church-wide council in Kyiv, the Ukrainian Orthodox Church announced its full independence and autonomy from the Moscow Patriarchate. The council made this decision in protest of the February 2022 Russian invasion of Ukraine, and particularly in response to Russian Orthodox Church head Patriarch Kirill's support for the invasion. Still, the UOC did not declare full autocephaly from the Russian Orthodox Church. As of 2025, its leadership is also still published in the ROC's calendar.

Since the Unification Council on 15 December 2018 which formed the separate Orthodox Church of Ukraine (OCU), the Ecumenical Patriarchate of Constantinople has disputed the claims by the Moscow Patriarchate of its ecclesiastical jurisdiction over the territory of Ukraine.

The Russian Orthodox Church does not currently recognize a change in their relationship to the UOC. However, in June 2023 ROC hierarch Metropolitan Leonid (Gorbachev) of Klin, scorned the UOC's decision to separate from the Moscow Patriarchate, saying, "When the opportunity presented itself to get out from under the wing of Moscow, they did it," and declared that the ROC would absorb the UOC's dioceses in Russian occupied areas of Ukraine.

On 20 August 2024, the Ukrainian parliament banned the Russian Orthodox Church by adopting the Law of Ukraine "On the Protection of the Constitutional Order in the Field of Activities of Religious Organizations". The law gave Ukrainian religious organizations affiliated with the ROC nine months to break off its relations with the Patriarchate of Moscow in accordance with the Canon law of the Eastern Orthodox Church.

== Name ==
The Ukrainian Orthodox Church insists on its name being just the Ukrainian Orthodox Church, stating that it is the sole canonical body of Orthodox Christians in the country, a Ukrainian "local church" (Ukrainian: Помісна Церква). The church rejects being labeled "Russian" or "Moscow."

It is also the name that it is registered with the State Committee of Religious Affairs in Ukraine.

It is often referred to as the Ukrainian Orthodox Church (Moscow Patriarchate) or UOC (MP) in order to distinguish between the two rival churches contesting the name of the Ukrainian Orthodox Church.

Following the creation of the Orthodox Church of Ukraine, on 20 December 2018, the Ukrainian parliament voted to force the UOC-MP to rename itself in its mandatory state registration, its new name must have "the full name of the church to which it is subordinated". This was protested by UOC-MP adherents. On 11 December 2019 the Supreme Court of Ukraine allowed the Ukrainian Orthodox Church (UOC) to retain its name. The UOC had argued that their governing center is in Ukraine's capital, Kyiv, not in Russia's capital, Moscow, and therefore it should not be renamed.

On 27 December 2022 the Constitutional Court of Ukraine ordered the UOC to change its name and indicate its affiliation with Russia. It took into account the verdict of the European Court of Human Rights in the case "Ilin and others against Ukraine" that stated Ukrainian law could force "religious organization, wishing to be registered, to take a name which makes it impossible to mislead the faithful and society as a whole and which makes it possible to distinguish it from existing organizations."

In May 2024 of the 8,097 UOC parishes 22 of them directly indicated their affiliation in their name.

== Relationship with the Russian Orthodox Church ==
Prior to the February 2022 full-scale Russian invasion of Ukraine the church stated that it was one of the "self-governing" churches under the jurisdiction of the Moscow Patriarchate, i.e. the Russian Orthodox Church (ROC). (In the terminology of the current Statute of the ROC, a "self-governing Church" is distinguished from an "autonomous Church").

The UOC claims since May 2022 that 'any provisions that at least somehow hinted at or indicated the connection with Moscow were excluded'; since then it is a matter of dispute as to whether the Church is under the ecclesiastical jurisdiction of the Russian Orthodox Church. Despite claims that the church did not publish its new statute, the new statute is publicly available on government, news, and official church websites.

The ROC defines the UOC-MP as a "self-governing church with rights of wide autonomy". It has also ignored all UOC-MP's declarations of it not being connected with it anymore and continues to include UOC-MP clerics in various commissions or working groups.

According to the Russian Orthodox Church, the Primate of the UOC-MP is the most senior permanent member of the ROC's Holy Synod and thus has a say in its decision-making in respect of the rest of the ROC throughout the world.

Despite the de facto annexation of Crimea by the Russian Federation in 2014, the eparchies of the UOC in Crimea initially continued to be administered by the UOC. In June 2022 the Moscow Patriarchate claimed to transfer Crimea from the Ukrainian Orthodox Church to the Moscow Patriarchate. The UOC continues to list the Crimean eparchies as its own, and has not recognized any change to its territorial boundaries based on decisions taken by the ROC. On 27 March 2023, Archbishop Viktor (Kotsaba) said that the territories of the Ukrainian Orthodox Church include the Crimea and Donbas areas of Ukraine.

On 21 June 2023, Metropolitan Leonid (Gorbachev) of Klin, a hierarch of the Russian Orthodox Church, decried the Ukrainian Orthodox Church's decision to separate from the Moscow Patriarchate and declared that the Russian Orthodox Church would absorb UOC dioceses in areas of Ukraine occupied by Russia.

In a Patriarchal calendar for 2024 released by the Russian Orthodox Church in December 2023 all the then bishops of the (designated itself as not connected to Russia) UOC were listed as bishops of the Russian Orthodox Church. In response, Archbishop Jonah (Cherepanov) of the Ukrainian Orthodox Church said that the UOC does not recognize any of the ROC's attempts to make decisions affecting Ukrainian dioceses. Later, the UOC's official website stated the following: "In order not to become an object of manipulation, everybody wishing to obtain official information about the UOC and its episcopate should refer solely to official sources of the Ukrainian Orthodox Church. This pertains also to information included in church calendars."

The UOC publicly distended itself from the World Russian People's Council headed and led by ROC head Patriarch Kirill of Moscow of late March 2024. During this Congress a document was approved that stated that the Russian invasion of Ukraine was a "Holy War." The document also stated that following the war "the entire territory of modern Ukraine should enter the zone of Russia's exclusive influence". This was to be done so "The possibility of the existence of a Russophobic political regime hostile to Russia and its people on this territory, as well as a political regime controlled from an external center hostile to Russia, should be completely excluded." The document also made reference to the "triunity of the Russian people" and it claimed that Belarusians and Ukrainians "should be recognised only as sub-ethnic groups of the Russians". The UOC stated on 28 March 2024 that they "dissociates itself from the ideology of the Russian world."

== History ==
=== Under the Ecumenical Patriarchate of Constantinople ===
==== Metropolises in Moscow, Lithuania and Galicia ====
The Ukrainian Orthodox Church considers itself the sole descendant in modern Ukraine of the Metropolis of Kiev and all Rus' that was established in the 10th century following the baptism of Kievan Rus'. Due to the Mongol invasion of Rus' in the 13th century, the metropolitan seat was moved to Vladimir and later to Moscow. In the Kingdom of Galicia and Volhynia to the south-west, a separate metropolis was erected - the Metropolis of Halych. Similarly, in the north-west, another metropolis was erected at the behest of Algirdas, the Grand Duke of Lithuania - the Metropolis of Lithuania.

==== Revival ====
In 1596, the Metropolitan of Kyiv, Galich and all Rus' Michael Rohoza accepted the Union of Brest transforming dioceses of the Ecumenical Patriarchate of Constantinople into the Ukrainian Greek Catholic Church under the Holy See's jurisdiction. In 1620, the Ecumenical Patriarchate of Constantinople Cyril Lucaris reestablished Orthodox dioceses for the Orthodox population of what was then the Polish–Lithuanian Commonwealth — under the Metropolitan of Kyiv, Galicia, and all Russia Job Boretsky as the Patriarchal Exarch.

=== Merger into the Moscow Patriarchate ===
Following the transfer of the Cossack Hetmanate under the sovereignty of the Tsardom of Russia in 1654, the Kyivan metropolis in 1686 was transferred by the Patriarch Dionysius IV under the jurisdiction of the Moscow Patriarchate, following the election of Gedeon Svyatopolk-Chetvertynsky as the Metropolitan of Kyiv, Galicia, and all Russia with the help of the Hetman of Zaporizhian Host Ivan Samoylovych. In late 2018, the Ecumenical Patriarchate of Constantinople indicated that information about that it transferred jurisdiction over Ukraine to the Moscow Patriarchate was inaccurate as Constantinople temporarily provided Moscow with stewardship over the Ukrainian church. The Russian Orthodox Church immediately rejected that statement and called for further discussion and revision of historical archives.

Soon, Gedeon gradually lost control of the dioceses which had been under the jurisdiction of the Metropolitan of Kyiv. In January 1688, Gedeon's title was changed by Moscow to the ″Metropolitan of Kyiv, Galich, and Little Russia″. Gedeon's successors were effectively mere diocesan bishops under the Moscow Patriarchate and later Russia's Most Holy Synod.

Before the Battle of Poltava, when Ivan Mazepa sided with Carl XII, the new Metropolitan Ioasaf along with bishops of Chernigov and Pereyaslav was summoned by Peter the Great to Hlukhiv where they were ordered to declare an anathema onto Mazepa. After the battle of Poltava, in 1709 Metropolitan Ioasaf was exiled to Tver and in 1710 a church censorship was introduced to the Kyiv metropolia. In 1718 Metropolitan Ioasaf was arrested and dispatched to Saint Petersburg for interrogation where he died.

From 1718 to 1722, the Metropolitan See in Kyiv was vacant and ruled by the Kyiv Spiritual Consistory (under the authority of the Most Holy Synod); in 1722 it was occupied by Archbishop Varlaam.

==== Synodal period ====
In 1730, Archbishop Varlaam with all members of the Kyiv Spiritual Consistory were put on trial by the Privy Chancellery. After being convicted, Varlaam as a simple monk was exiled to the Kirillo-Belozersky Monastery in Vologda region where he served a sentence of imprisonment of 10 years. After the death of the Russian Empress Anna in 1740, Varlaam was allowed to return and recovered all his Archiereus titles. He however refused to accept back those titles and, after asked to be left in peace, moved to the Tikhvin Assumption Monastery. In 1750 Varlaam accepted the Great Schema under the name of Vasili and soon died in 1751.

In 1743, the title of Metropolitan was re-instated for Archbishop Raphael Zaborovsky.

On 2 April 1767, the Empress of Russia Catherine the Great issued an edict stripping the title of the Kyivan Metropolitan of the style "and all Little Russia".

==== Fall of monarchy in Russia and Exarchate ====
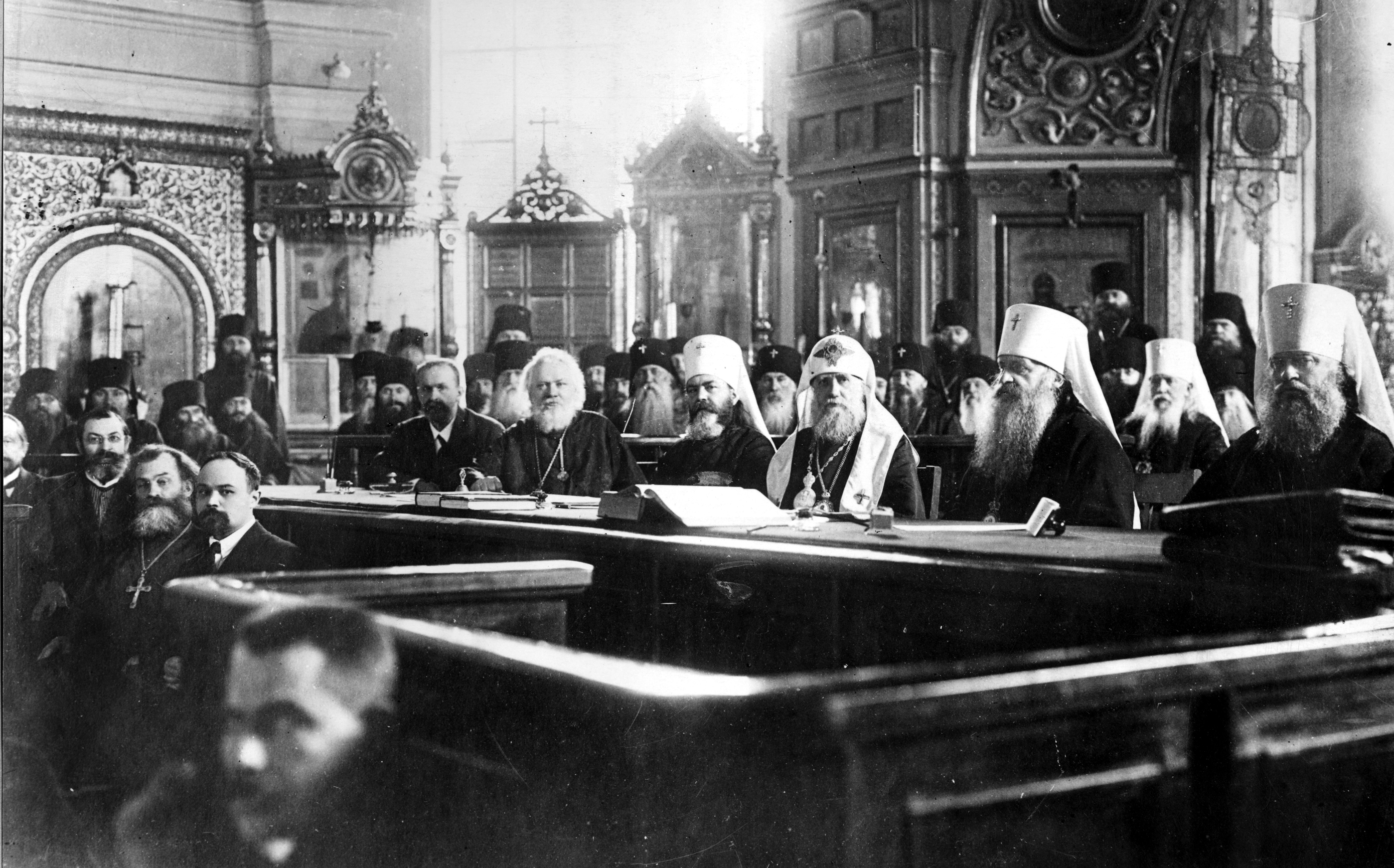
Participants of the 1917 Local Council. Metropolitan Antony Khrapovitsky is to the right of Patriarch Tikhon.

Metropolitan Vladimir Bogoyavlensky chaired the All-Ukrainian Church Council that took a break between its sessions on 18 January 1918 and was to be resumed in May 1918. On 23–24 January 1918, the Red Guards of Reingold Berzin occupied Kyiv (see Ukrainian–Soviet War). In the evening of 25 January 1918, Metropolitan Vladimir was found dead between walls of the Old Pechersk Fortress beyond the Gates of All Saints, having been killed by unknown people.

In May 1918, the Metropolitan of Kyiv and Galich Antony Khrapovitsky was appointed to the Kyiv eparchy, a former candidate to become the Patriarch of Moscow at the Russian Local Council of 1917 and losing it to the Patriarch Tikhon. In July 1918 Metropolitan Antony became the head of the All-Ukrainian Church Council. Eventually he sided with the Russian White movement supporting the forces of Anton Denikin's of South Russian entity, while keeping the title of Metropolitan of Kyiv and Halych. After the defeat of the Whites and the exile of Antony, in 1919-21 the metropolitan seat was temporarily held by the bishop of Cherkasy Nazariy (also the native of Kazan). After the arrest of Nazariy by the Soviet authorities in 1921, the seat was provisionally held by the bishop of Grodno and newly elected Exarch of Ukraine Mikhail, a member of the Russian Black Hundreds nationalistic movement. After his arrest in 1923, the Kyiv eparchy was provisionally headed by various bishops of neighboring eparchies until 1927. After his return in 1927 Mikhail became the Metropolitan of Kyiv and Exarch of Ukraine until his death in 1929.

In 1945, after the integration of Zakarpattia Oblast into the USSR, eastern parts of the Eparchy of Mukačevo and Prešov were transferred from the supreme jurisdiction of the Serbian Orthodox Church to the jurisdiction of the Exarchate of Russian Orthodox Church in Ukraine, and a new Eparchy of Mukachevo and Uzhgorod was formed.

==== Dissolution of the Soviet Union and self rule ====
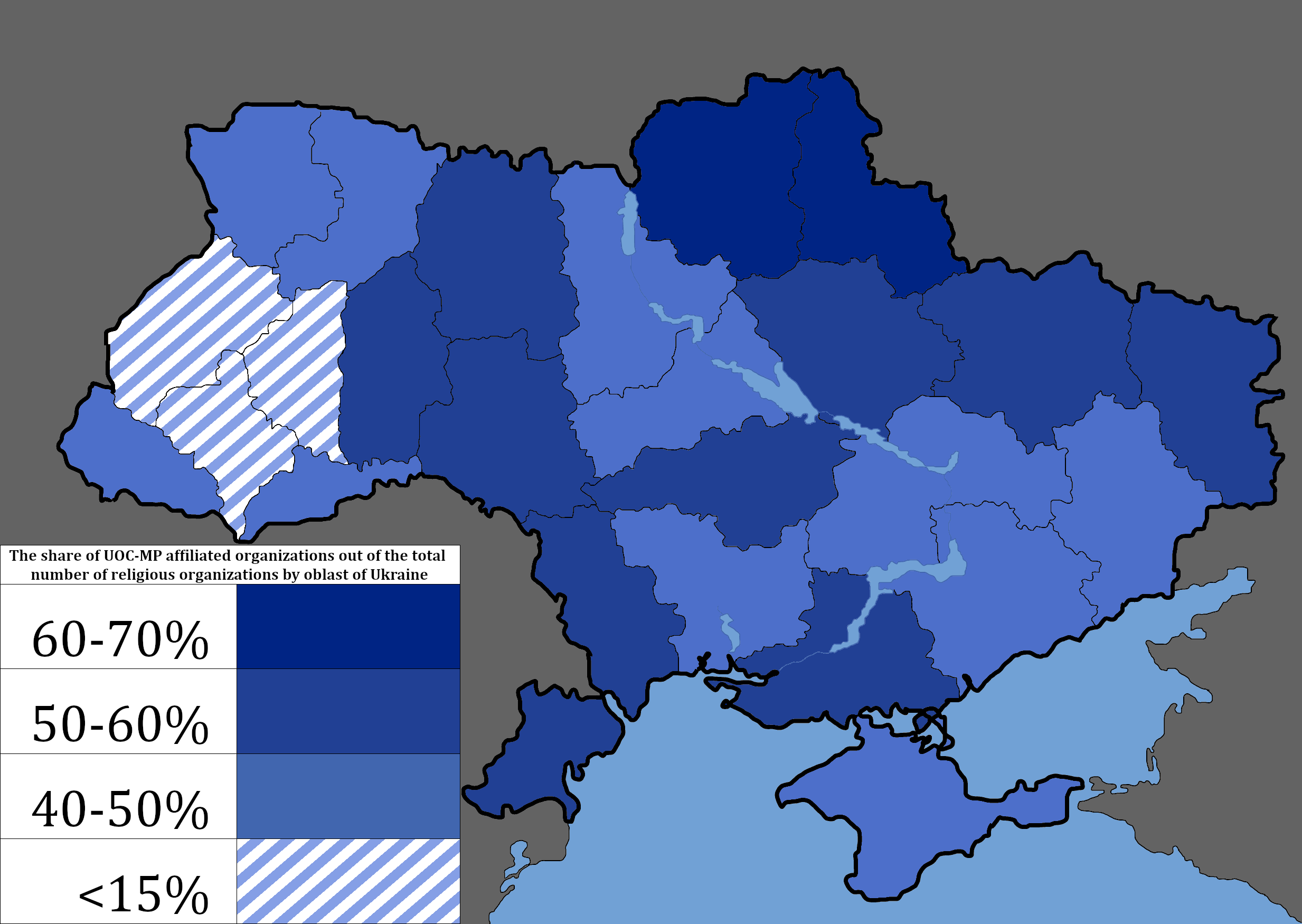
Map showing the percentage of religious organizations that were UOC-MP affiliated by oblast of Ukraine, 2006

On 28 October 1990, the Moscow Patriarchate granted the Ukrainian Exarchate a status of a self–governing church under the jurisdiction of the ROC (but not the full autonomy as is understood in the ROC legal terminology). However, the Ukrainian branch remained crucial to the Moscow Patriarchate, because of historical and traditional roots in Kyiv and Ukraine, and because nearly a third of the Moscow Patriarchate's 36,000 congregations were in Ukraine.

Metropolitan Vladimir (Sabodan), who succeeded Filaret (Denysenko), was enthroned in 1992 as the Primate of the UOC under the title Metropolitan of Kyiv and all Ukraine, with the official residency in the Kyiv Pechersk Lavra, which also houses all of the Church's administration.

The UOC-MP, prior to 2019, was believed to be the largest religious body in Ukraine with the greatest number of parish churches and communities counting up to half of the total in Ukraine and totaling over 10,000. The UOC also claimed to have up to 75 percent of the Ukrainian population. Independent surveys showed significant variance. According to Stratfor, in 2008, more than 50 percent of Ukrainian population belonged to the Ukrainian Orthodox Church under the Moscow Patriarch. Razumkov Centre survey results, however, tended to show greater adherence to the rival Ukrainian Orthodox Church of the Kyivan Patriarchate.

Many Orthodox Ukrainians do not clearly identify with a particular Orthodox jurisdiction and, sometimes, are even unaware of the affiliation of the parish they attend as well as of the controversy itself, which indicates the difficulty of using survey numbers as an indicator of a relative strength of the church. Additionally, the geographical factor plays a major role in the number of adherents, as the Ukrainian population tends to be more churchgoing in the western part of the country rather than in the UOC-MP's heartland in southern and eastern Ukraine. Politically, many in Ukraine see the UOC-MP as merely a puppet of the ROC and consequently a geopolitical tool of Russia, which have stridently opposed the consolidation and recognition of the independent OCU.

==== Russo-Ukrainian War and changing allegiances of parishes ====
Since 2014, the church has come under attack for perceived anti-Ukrainian and pro-Russian actions by its clergymen.

In spring 2014, Ukraine lost control over Crimea, which was unilaterally annexed by Russia in March 2014. (Note: The status of the Crimea and of the city of Sevastopol is currently under dispute between Russia and Ukraine; Ukraine and the majority of the international community consider the Crimea to be an autonomous republic of Ukraine and Sevastopol to be one of Ukraine's cities with special status, while Russia, on the other hand, considers the Crimea to be a federal subject of Russia and Sevastopol to be one of Russia's three federal cities.) The Ukrainian Orthodox Church (Moscow Patriarchate) Metropolitan of Feodosia and Kerch Platon Udovenko, and other Ukrainian Orthodox Church priests, blessed Russian weapons and met with representatives of (the then formed Russian administrative unit) Republic of Crimea. Notwithstanding this Russian annexation of Crimea, the Ukrainian Orthodox Church (Moscow Patriarchate) kept control of its eparchies in Crimea until June 2022.

Continuing during the spring of 2014 in the Donbas region of eastern Ukraine, pro-Russian protests escalated into an armed separatist insurgency. Early in April 2014, masked gunmen took control of several of the region's government buildings and towns. This action led to the creation of the self-proclaimed Donetsk People's Republic and Luhansk People's Republic. This further resulted in an armed conflict between Russian Separatist forces in Donbas and the Ukrainian Army. Instances were recorded of Ukrainian Orthodox Church (Moscow Patriarchate) clergymen supporting the Donetsk People's Republic and Luhansk People's Republic. On 14 September 2015, the church urged the pro-Russian separatists to lay down their arms and take advantage of the amnesty promised to them in the Minsk II agreement.

From 2014 until 2018 around 60 Moscow Patriarchate parishes switched to the Kyivan Patriarchate in transfers the leadership. The Moscow patriarchate says these changes were illegal. According to the Razumkov Center, among the 27.8 million Ukrainian members of Orthodox churches, allegiance to the Kyiv Patriarchate grew from 12 percent in 2000, to 25 percent in 2016—and much of the growth came from believers who previously did not associate with either patriarchate. In April 2018, the Moscow patriarchate had 12,300 parishes and the Kyivan Patriarchate 5,100 parishes.

In 2017, Ukraine passed laws which the Moscow Patriarchate interpreted as discriminatory.

==== Greater autonomy from the ROC ====
From 29 November to 2 December 2017, the Russian Orthodox Church Bishops’ Council met to consider the matter of autonomy to the UOC-MP. The members decided to write a separate chapter of the ROC Statute to confirm the status of UOC-MP which contained the following provisions:

1. The Ukrainian Orthodox Church is granted independence and self-governance according to the Resolution of the Bishops’ Council of the Russian Orthodox Church which took place on 25–27 October 1990.
2. The Ukrainian Orthodox Church is an independent and self-governed Church with broad autonomy rights.
3. In her life and work the Ukrainian Orthodox Church is guided by the Resolution of the 1990 Bishops’ Council of the Russian Orthodox Church on the Ukrainian Orthodox Church, the 1990 Deed of the Patriarch of Moscow and All Russia and the Statute on the governance of the Ukrainian Orthodox Church.

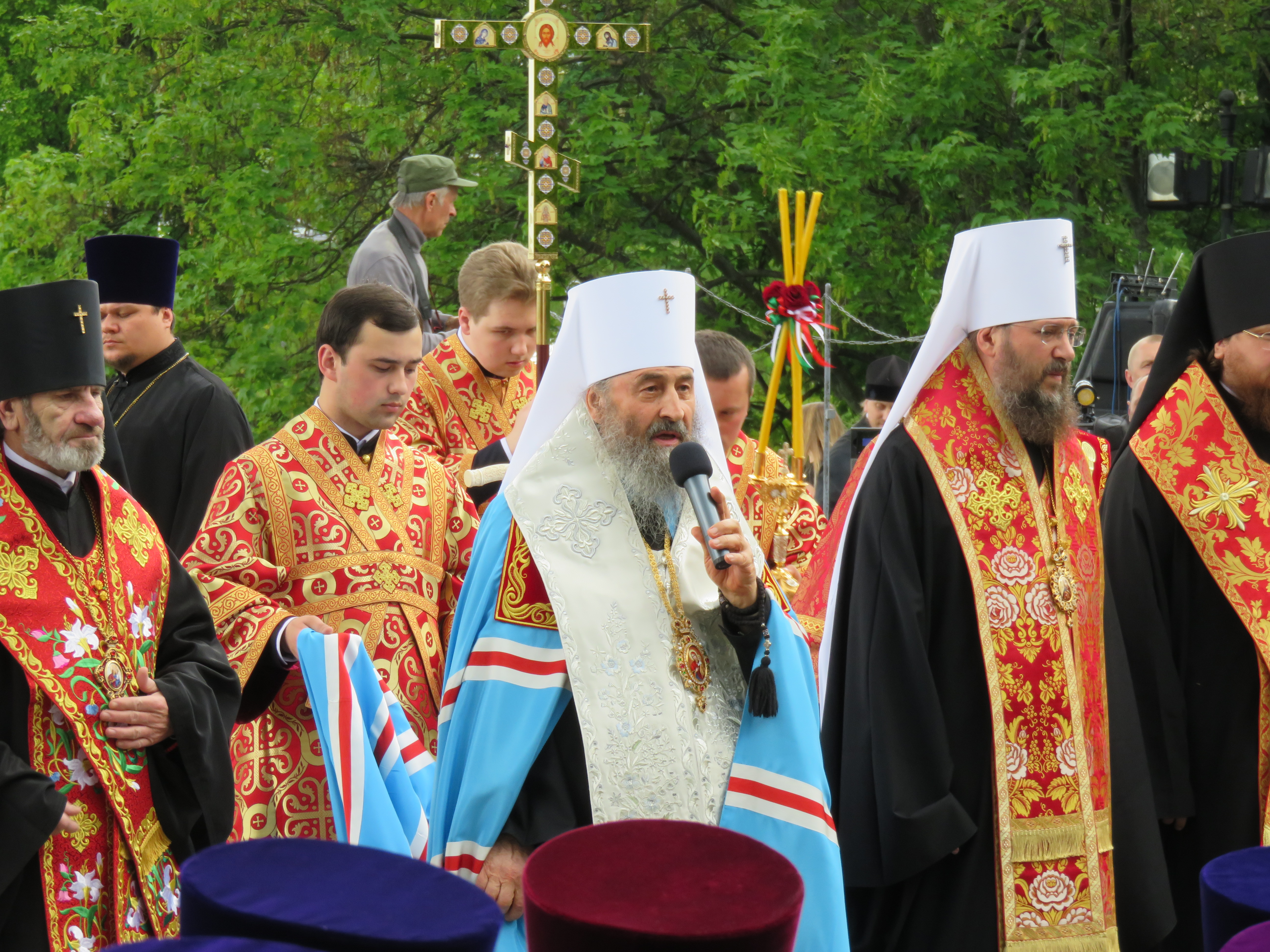
Metropolitan Onufriy Berezovsky in Kyiv, 8 May 2016

In December 2017, the Security Service of Ukraine published classified documents revealing that the NKGB of the USSR and its units in the Union and autonomous republics, territories and regions were engaged in the selection of candidates for participation in the 1945 council that elected Patriarch Alexy I of Moscow from the representatives of the clergy and the laity. This included "persons who have religious authority among the clergy and believers, and at the same time checked for civic or patriotic work". A letter sent in September 1944 and signed by the head of the 2nd Directorate of the NKGB of the USSR Fedotov and the head of the Fifth Division 2nd Directorate of Karpov stated that "it is important to ensure that the number of nominated candidates is dominated by the agents of the NKGB, capable of holding the line that we need at the Council."

On 13 December 2018, a priest of the church, Volodymyr Maretsky, was sentenced in absentia to 6 years of imprisonment for hindering the Armed Forces of Ukraine in 2014 during the Russo-Ukrainian War. In November–December 2018, Security Service of Ukraine (SBU) carries out raids across the country targeting the UOC churches and priests.

In the week following the creation of the Orthodox Church of Ukraine on 15 December 2018, several parishes announced they would leave the UOC (MP) and join the new church.

On 20 December 2018, the Verkhovna Rada (Ukraine's national parliament) passed a legislation to change the UOC's registered name. Ukrainian deputy Oleksandr Bryhynets described the law as stipulating if "the state is recognized as the aggressor state, the church whose administration is based in the aggressor state must have in its title the full name of the church to which it is subordinate." The law also gave such a church "no right to be represented in military units on the front line." The Russian Orthodox Church is based in Russia, which is considered by Ukraine as an aggressor state following the 2014 Russian military intervention in Ukraine. The UOC was part of the Russian church at that time, but considered to be a "self-governing church with rights of wide autonomy", thus, the UOC argued that its governing center was in Kyiv and it could not be legally renamed on the basis of this law. On 11 December 2019, the Supreme Court of Ukraine allowed the Ukrainian Orthodox Church to retain its name.

The January 2019 establishment of the Orthodox Church of Ukraine (OCU) by Patriarch Bartholomew I of Constantinople, joined two other churches: the Ukrainian Orthodox Church – Kyiv Patriarchate (UOC-KP), and the Ukrainian Autocephalous Orthodox Church (UAOC), along with two bishops who formerly belonged to the UOC-MP. The remaining UOC-MP hierarchy continued to dismiss Patriarch Bartholomew's actions in Ukraine and remained loyal to the UOC-MP, while the church retained the vast majority of its parishes. A May 2019 report by the European Council on Foreign Relations noted that the Moscow Patriarchate claimed 11,000 churches in Ukraine, while the new OCU claimed 7,000.

==== Russian invasion of Ukraine ====
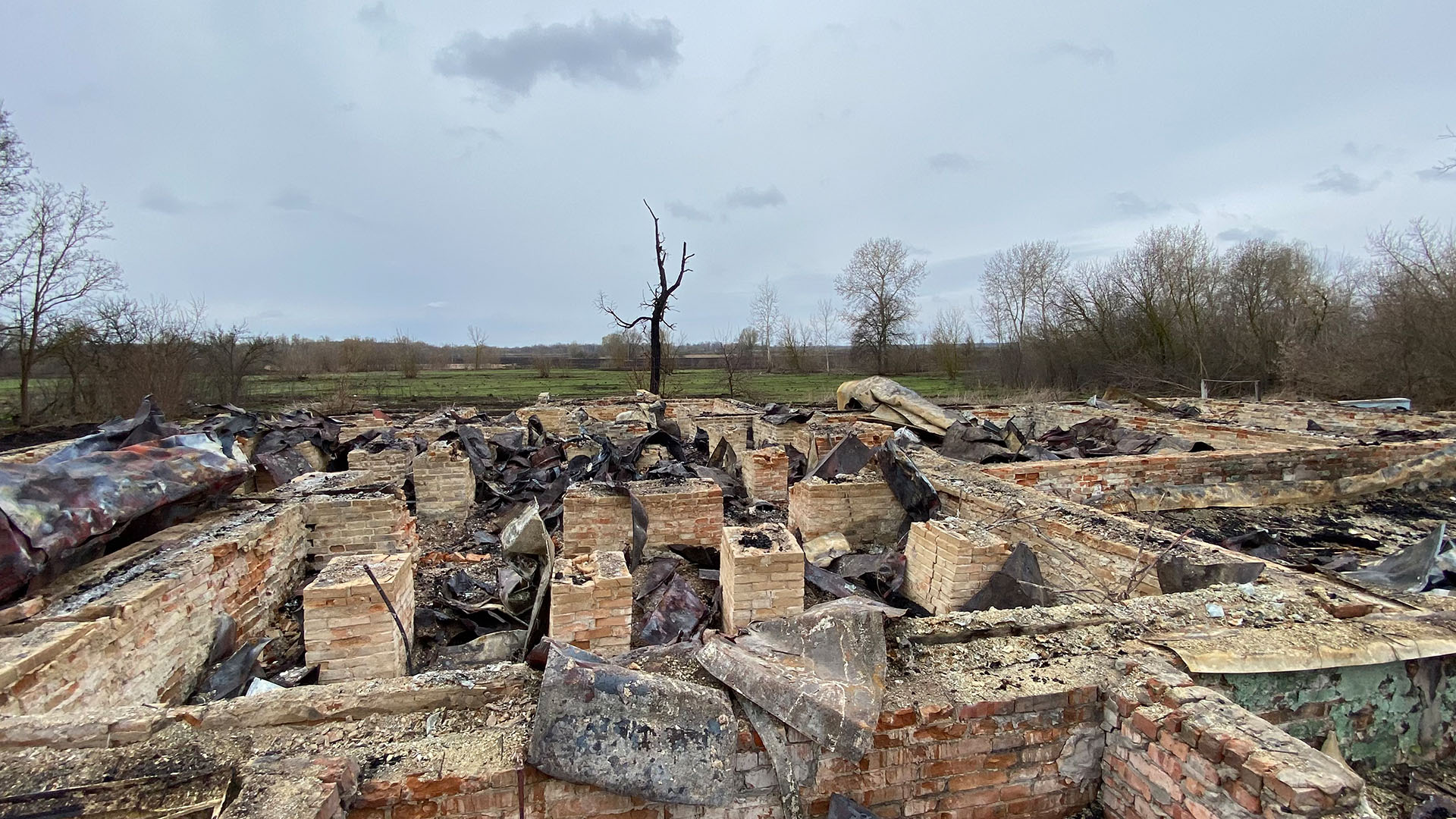
Church of the Ascension of the Ukrainian Orthodox Church in Lukianivka, which was destroyed by Russian troops during Russia's failed Kyiv offensive of February – April 2022

On 24 February 2022, Metropolitan Onufriy stated that the large scale Russian invasion of Ukraine on that day was "a repetition of the sin of Cain, who killed his own brother out of envy. Such a war has no justification either from God or from people." In April 2022, after the Russian invasion, some UOC parishes signaled their intention to switch allegiance to the Orthodox Church of Ukraine. The attitude and stance of the head of the Russian Orthodox Church, Patriarch Kirill of Moscow, to the war is one of the oft-quoted reasons. At the time, the UOC and the other Orthodox churches stated that the church known as the Ukrainian Orthodox Church (UOC) was one of the "self-governing" churches under the jurisdiction of the Moscow Patriarchate, i.e., the Russian Orthodox Church (ROC).

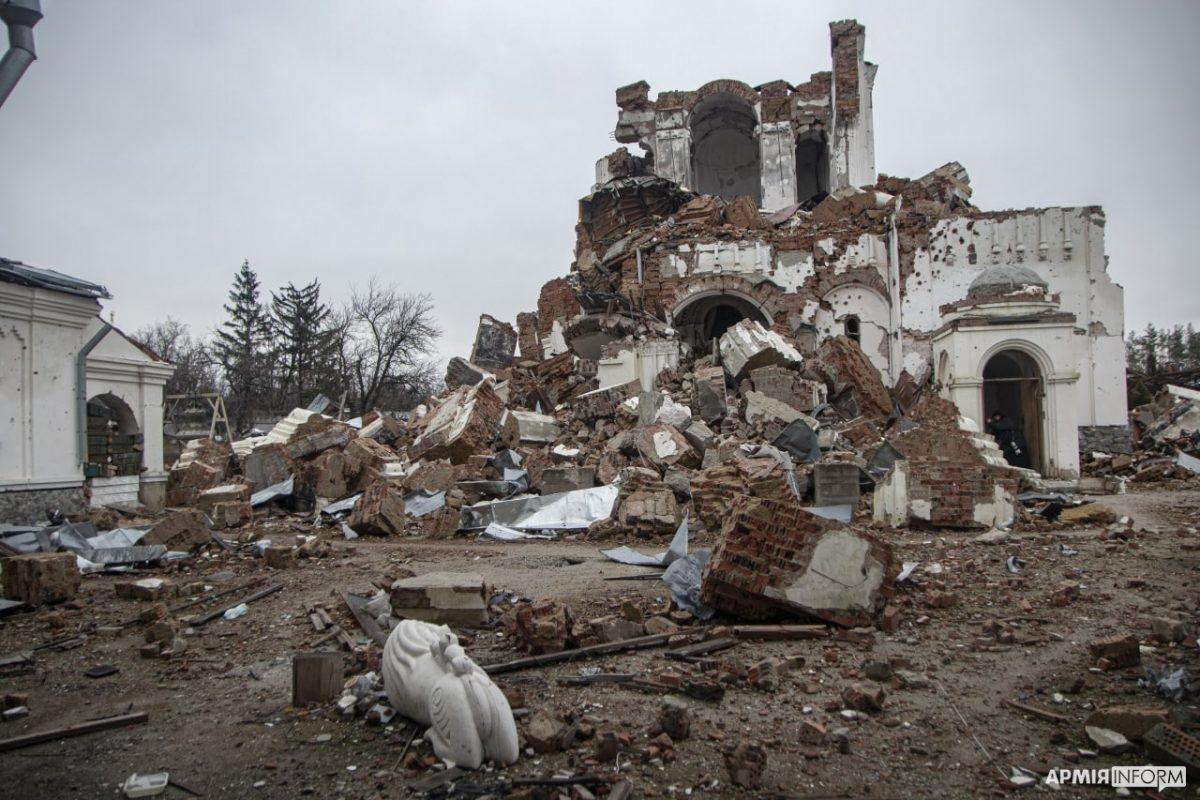
St. George's church of the Ukrainian Orthodox Church Sviatohirsk Lavra monastery complex after Russian shelling on 12 May 2022

On 12 May 2022, the synod of the UOC met for the first time since the start of the war and issued a statement of support for Ukraine's armed forces, while condemning the Russian invasion. Some critics claim that the church collaborates with Russian clergymen and that the church turns a blind eye towards these collaborators. The same day the church issued another statement in which it insinuated that "the religious policy during the presidency of Petro Poroshenko and the destructive ideology of the so-called Orthodox Church of Ukraine" had led to the 24 February 2022 Russian invasion of Ukraine.

On 27 May 2022 the Ukrainian Orthodox Church held a synod and the same day released a declaration in which it stated "it had adopted relevant additions and changes to the Statute on the Administration of the Ukrainian Orthodox Church, which testify to the complete autonomy and independence of the Ukrainian Orthodox Church." An official request for autocephaly (an autocephalous church does not report to any higher-ranking bishop) was not made; the consent of Russian Orthodox Church (for independence) was not sought; neither was sought the approval of (the) other Orthodox churches. The church did not publish its new constitution. In an announcement on Telegram, Archpriest Nikolai Danilevich (head of the UOC's Department of External Church Relations) stated: "The UOC disassociated itself from the Moscow Patriarchate and confirmed its independent status, and made appropriate changes to its statutes. All references to the connection of the UOC with the Russian Orthodox Church have been removed from the statutes. In fact, in its content, the UOC statutes are now those of an autocephalous Church." In its 27 May 2022 declaration the church first (point was to) condemned the war, its secondly called on both Ukraine and the Russian Federation to continue the peace negotiations "for a strong and reasonable dialogue that could stop the bloodshed" and it thirdly stated it disagreed with "the position of Patriarch Kirill of Moscow and All Russia regarding the war in Ukraine". In the statement it also expressed its disagreement with the Patriarch of Constantinople to grant autocephaly in January 2019 to the Orthodox Church of Ukraine and it asked for end of the "forcible seizure of churches and the forced transfer of parishes of the Ukrainian Orthodox Church." Prior to 27 May 2022, more than 400 parishes had left the Moscow Patriarchate as a consequence of the invasion.

On 27 May 2022, the church also decided to open foreign parishes. By April 2023, it had established more than 40 parishes in 15 European countries: Austria, Belgium, Denmark, Italy, Spain, Ireland, the Netherlands, Germany, Norway, Portugal, Hungary, France, Switzerland, Sweden, and the United Kingdom.

On 29 May 2022, Metropolitan Onufriy did not mention Patriarch Kirill during the liturgy as someone who had authority over him (like before), instead he commemorated all heads of churches, similar to primatial divine liturgies. Onufriy also did not commemorate the Ecumenical Patriarch Bartholomew I of Constantinople, Patriarch Theodoros II of Alexandria, Archbishop Ieronymos II of Athens (Greece), and Archbishop Chrysostomos II of Cyprus - indicating that communion is still interrupted between them. Despite the removal of direct mentions of the Russian Orthodox Church, the Charter of the Patriarch of Moscow and All Russia Alexy II the statute refers to declares the canonical dependence on the ROC. According to a Ukrainian theologian Oleksandr Sahan, the church have done these changes in order to avoid renaming in accordance with the Ukrainian law.

In June 2022, the Moscow Patriarchate decided to re-transfer Crimea from the Ukrainian Church of the Moscow Patriarchate by creating the Metropolitanate of Crimea. Since the 2014 Russian annexation of Crimea the Ukrainian Orthodox Church had kept control of its eparchies in Crimea. The UOC continues to list the Crimean eparchies and has not recognized any change to its territorial boundaries based on decisions taken by the ROC. On 27 March 2023, Archbishop Viktor (Kotsaba) said that the territories of the Ukrainian Orthodox Church include the Crimea and Donbas areas of Ukraine.

On 30 June 2022, the Lviv City Council decided to ban the Moscow Patriarchate on the territory of Lviv.

During the Russian occupation of Kharkiv Oblast, Metropolitan of Izium and Kupiansk, Elisey, blessed the Russian-appointed Governor Vitaly Ganchev. During the Russian occupation of Sumy Oblast, Metropolitan of Romny Iosif requested that his Metropolitanate would be under direct subordination of the Russian Orthodox Church. All Luhansk Oblast bishops of the UOC were present at a meeting with the leader of the (a part of Ukraine declared independent by pro-Russian forces in 2014) Luhansk People's Republic, Leonid Pasechnik, in the summer of 2022. Metropolitan Panteleymon of Luhansk and Alchevsk was present during the annexation of Donetsk, Kherson, Luhansk and Zaporizhzhia oblasts ceremony in Moscow, Russia, on 30 September 2022. Metropolitan Ilarion of Donetsk and Metropolitan Lazar of Crimea had received invitations to this ceremony, but declined to go. Metropolitan Panteleymon refused the possibility that his Metropolitanate would be under direct subordination of the Russian Orthodox Church, and he himself does not have Russian citizenship. Metropolitan Onufriy did not publicly condemn collaborating UOC clergymen, and they were not dismissed from the church. Metropolitan Onufriy did ban from the church UOC clergymen that transferred themself to the Orthodox Church of Ukraine (OCU). Following the liberation of Romny on 4 April 2022 Metropolitan Iosif is believed to have fled to Russia, and he was replaced by Metropolitan Roman on 19 October 2022. After in the 2022 Kharkiv counteroffensive Ukraine recaptured Izium (on 10 September 2022) Metropolitan Elisey also went fugitive and he was replaced also. (Note: An archpriest of the UOC Izium diocese, Oleksandr Svyrydov, who blessed Russian troops during the Russian occupation of Kharkiv Oblast and who also fled to Russia when Kharkiv Oblast was largely liberated was later appointed rector of the Orthodox parish of the Church of St John the Baptist in Diocese of Tver of the Russian Orthodox Church.)

By early November 2022, the Security Service of Ukraine had exposed 33 alleged "agents" and alleged unofficial artillery observers among the UOC priests and clergy. It had opened 23 criminal proceedings. This was part of a series of searches conducted by Ukrainian law enforcement at premises of the Ukrainian Orthodox Church, over 350 church buildings and 850 persons were investigated. In 2022, 52 criminal cases involving 55 UOC clergymen, including 14 bishops, were opened. 17 UOC clergymen were sanctioned by the National Security and Defence Council of Ukraine. They were accused of proposing that the dioceses they lead join the Russian Orthodox Church; agreeing to cooperate with the occupation authorities; promoting pro-Russian narratives; and justifying Russia's military aggression in Ukraine.

On 2 December 2022, Ukrainian President Volodymyr Zelenskyy introduced a bill to the Verkhovna Rada that would officially ban all activities of the UOC in Ukraine. On the same day, the Kyiv Pechersk Lavra monastery was claimed to be extrajudicially transferred from the UOC to the Orthodox Church of Ukraine (OCU), but the UOC refuted this.

On 14 December 2022, Ukraine handed over a UOC priest to Russia in a prisoner exchange. The priest had been sentenced for treason in Ukraine. (Note: In an interview dated 21 April 2023 the head of the Security Service of Ukraine Vasyl Malyuk claimed that Ukraine had exchanged one priests of the Ukrainian Orthodox Church of the Moscow Patriarchate (accused of collaborating with the Russian Federation) for 28 Ukrainian servicemen.)

On 27 December 2022, the Constitutional Court of Ukraine recognized as in accordance with the Constitution of Ukraine the 20 December 2018 law to change the UOC-MP's registered name to indicate affiliation with Russia. The court also upheld the law that restricted access to the Armed Forces of Ukraine and other military formations of Ukraine to clergy from a church "from outside Ukraine" "which carried out military aggression against Ukraine."

Although the UOC-MP, in a press conference on 31 December 2022, again stated that ‘any provisions that at least somehow hinted at or indicated the connection with Moscow were excluded’, the Russian Orthodox Church ignored this and continued to include UOC-MP clerics in various commissions or working groups despite these individuals not agreeing to this. For instance, in late December 2022, UOC-MP Archpriest Volodymyr Savelyev was against his knowing included in the ROC Publishing Council for the period 2023–2026, after finding this out he demanded to be expelled from the council (while simultaneously condemning "the aggressive war waged by Russia against my homeland — Ukraine").

In January 2023, 13 representatives of the UOC-MP were deprived of their Ukrainian citizenship, including two metropolitans. In February 2023, five UOC-MP (either) metropolitans, archbishops, and bishops were deprived of their Ukrainian citizenship, while Metropolitan Feodosiy Platon was banned from entering Ukraine.

The religious buildings and other property of the Kyiv Pechersk Lavra Cultural Reserve (although state property) have been used for decades by the UOC-MP free of charge. On 10 March 2023, the Reserve announced that the 2013 agreement on the free use of churches by the religious organisation would be terminated (on the grounds that the church had violated their lease by making alterations to the historic site, and other technical infractions) and the UOC-MP was ordered to leave the territory by 29 March. The UOC-MP answered back that there were no legal grounds for the eviction and called it "a whim of officials from the Ministry of Culture." On 17 March 2023, the press secretary for Russian President Vladimir Putin, Dmitry Peskov, stated that the decision of the Ukrainian authorities not to extend this lease to representatives of the UOC-MP "confirms the correctness" of the (24 February 2022) Russian invasion of Ukraine. The UOC-MP did not fully leave Kyiv Pechersk Lavra following 29 March 2023.

On 7 April 2023, Ukrainska Pravda reported that their research had uncovered that several high-ranking UOC-MP clergymen, including Metropolitan Onufriy, had obtained Russian passports. The UOC-MP denied that its clergymen and its leader, Metropolitan Onufrii, had Russian citizenship. Metropolitan Onufriy did not deny he used to have it, but claimed he had obtained a Russian passport to fulfill his desire to live out his last days in the Trinity Lavra of St. Sergius, but that he did not have this ambition anymore.

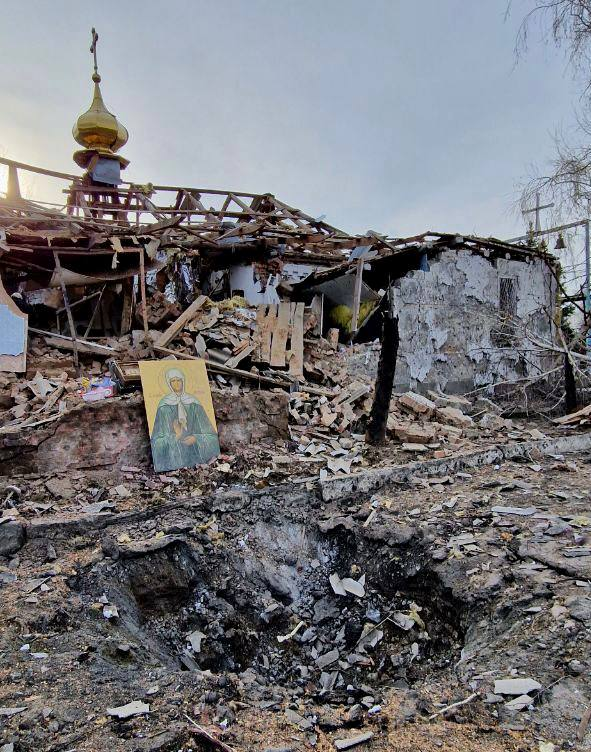
Saint Michael church (1906) of the Ukrainian Orthodox Church in Komyshuvakha after Russian shelling on Easter night, 16 April 2023. Visible is the icon of Saint Matrona of Moscow.

On 10 April 2023, the Rivne Oblast Council voted to ban the activities of the UOC in Rivne Oblast. The following day the Volyn Oblast Council banned the activities of the church in Volyn Oblast.

On 10 April 2023, registration data analyser company Opendatabot stated that 277 parishes had left the Moscow Patriarchate since the February 2022 Russian invasion; 63 of those 227 parishes had done so in the first three months of 2023. Opendatabot concluded that on 10 April 2023, 8,505 churches were subordinate to the Ukrainian Orthodox Church in Ukraine.

On 13 April 2023, the Ukrainian Orthodox Church consecrated Holy Chrism in Kyiv for the first time in 110 years.

On 27 April 2023, the Zhytomyr Oblast Council voted to outlaw the activities of the church in Zhytomyr Oblast.

On 28 April 2023, the Vinnytsia Oblast Council terminated all land lease contracts of the church in Vinnytsia Oblast.

On 3 May 2024, Opendatabot concluded that 8,097 churches were subordinate to the Ukrainian Orthodox Church in Ukraine.

On 25 June 2024, Ukraine handed over a UOC priest to Russia in a prisoner exchange. The priest had been sentenced to 5 years in prison "for justifying Russian armed aggression." On 26 June 2024, this priest, Metropolitan Ionafan, was met by the head of the Russian Orthodox Church, Patriarch Kirill of Moscow, who awarded Ionafan with the Order of St. Sergius of Radonezh, first class.

On 8 January 2026, the State Service of Ukraine for Ethnopolitics and Freedom of Conscience stated that 1,378 parishes had left the Moscow Patriarchate and had become part of its rival, the Orthodox Church of Ukraine, since the February 2022 Russian invasion. According to their data (as of 1 January 2026), 9,792 UOC-MP religious communities continued to operate in Ukraine, and there were 10,118 religious organizations subordinate to the church.

==== Outlawing of "religious organizations to operate under the control of a state that carries out aggression against Ukraine" ====
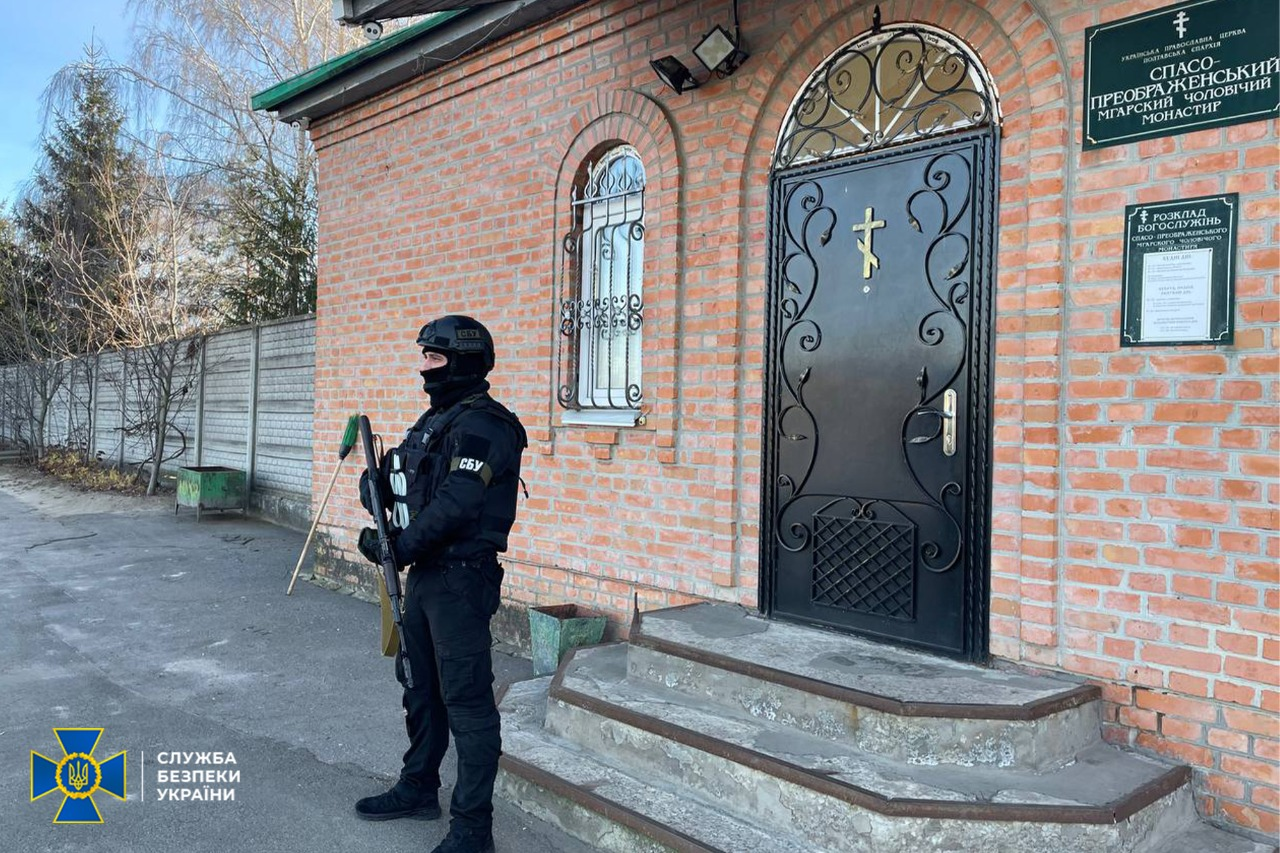
Security Service of Ukraine agent searching a UOC-MP church

On 20 August 2024, the Verkhovna Rada (the national parliament of Ukraine) adopted the Law of Ukraine "On the Protection of the Constitutional Order in the Field of Activities of Religious Organizations", introducing the possibility of banning Ukrainian religious organizations affiliated with the Russian Orthodox Church nine months from the moment the State Service of Ukraine for Ethnopolicy and Freedom of Conscience issues the order, if this religious organization does not sever relations with the Russian Orthodox Church in accordance with Orthodox canon law. On 24 August 2024 (also the Independence Day of Ukraine), President Volodymyr Zelenskyy signed the law. The same day, the law was also published in Holos Ukrainy, and the law came into force on the day following its publication.

On 2 July 2025, the Ukrainian President, Volodymyr Zelenskyy, issued a decree that effectively revoked the Ukrainian citizenship of Metropolitan Onufriy (head of the church). Alongside the accusation that he had obtained Russian citizenship (which he admitted to), the Security Service of Ukraine (SBU) accused Onufriy of maintaining ties with the Russian Orthodox Church, "whose representatives openly support Russian aggression against Ukraine", and had deliberately opposed obtaining canonical independence from this church. The SBU also concluded that, "despite the full-scale invasion of Russia", Onufriy continued to support the policy of the Russian Orthodox Church and its leadership, in particular Patriarch Kirill of Moscow.

== Administrative divisions ==
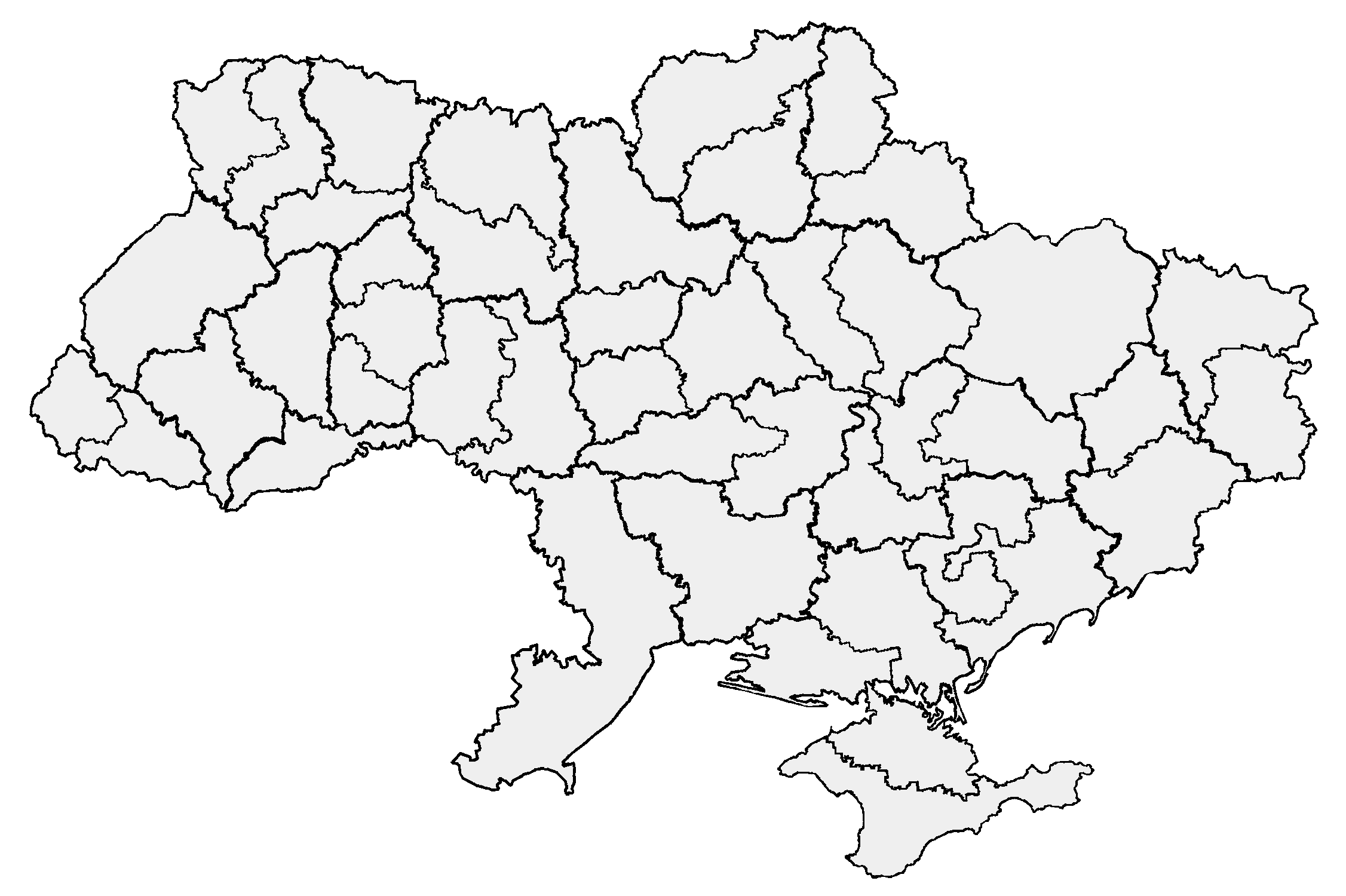
Eparchies of the Ukrainian Orthodox Church (Moscow Patriarchate) in 2011

In October 2014 the Russian Orthodox Church in Ukraine was subdivided into 53 eparchies (dioceses) led by bishops. Also there were 25 vicars (suffragan bishops).

In 2008 the Church had 42 eparchies, with 58 bishops (eparchial - 42; vicar - 12; retired - 4; with them being classified as: metropolitans - 10; archbishops - 21; or bishops - 26). There were also 8,516 priests, and 443 deacons. Technically each Orthodox parish is an individual legal entity.

Notwithstanding the 2014 Russian annexation of Crimea the Ukrainian Orthodox Church (Moscow Patriarchate) kept control of its eparchies in Crimea until June 2022. In January 2019 the head of the Information and Educational Department of the UOC-MP, Archbishop Clement, stated that "from the point of view of the church canon and the church system, Crimea is Ukrainian territory."

In June 2022 the Moscow Patriarchate decided to re-transfer Crimea from the Ukrainian Church of the Moscow Patriarchate. They did this by creating the Metropolitanate of Crimea. The UOC continues to list the Crimean eparchies and has not recognized any change to its territorial boundaries based on decisions taken by the ROC. On 27 March 2023, Archbishop Viktor (Kotsaba) said that the territories of the Ukrainian Orthodox Church include the Crimea and Donbas areas of Ukraine.

Following the February 2022 full-scale Russian invasion of Ukraine the church opened more than 40 parishes in 15 European countries (Austria, Belgium, Great Britain, Denmark, Italy, Spain, Ireland, the Netherlands, Germany, Norway, Portugal, Hungary, France, Switzerland, Sweden).

== List of primates ==
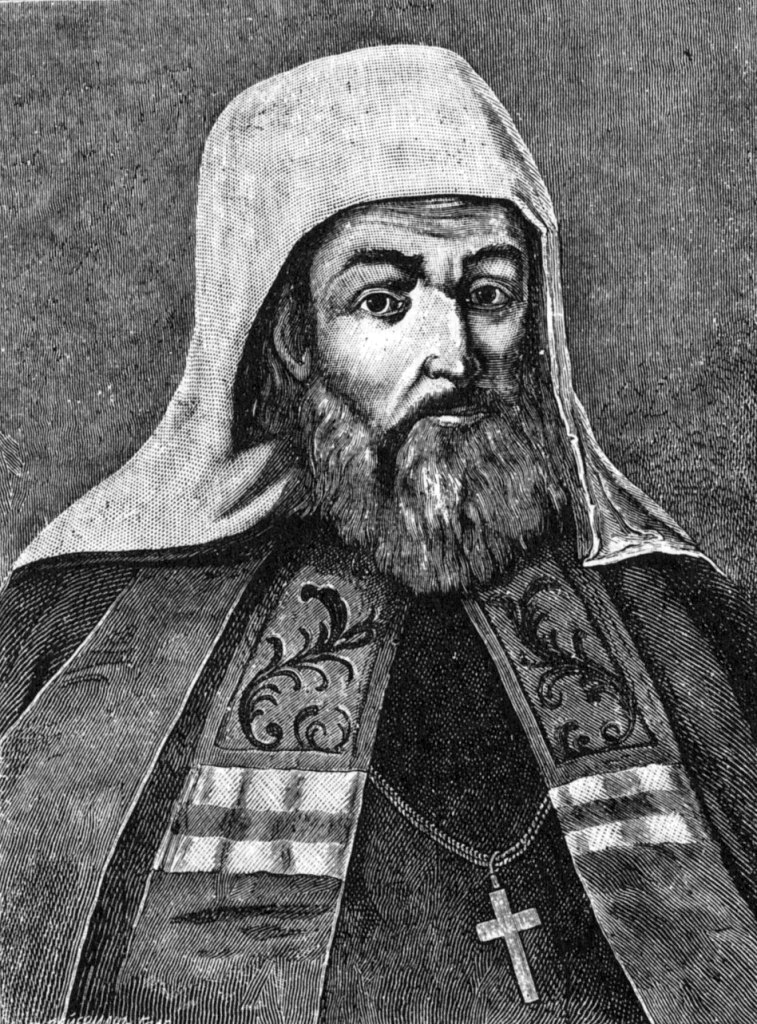
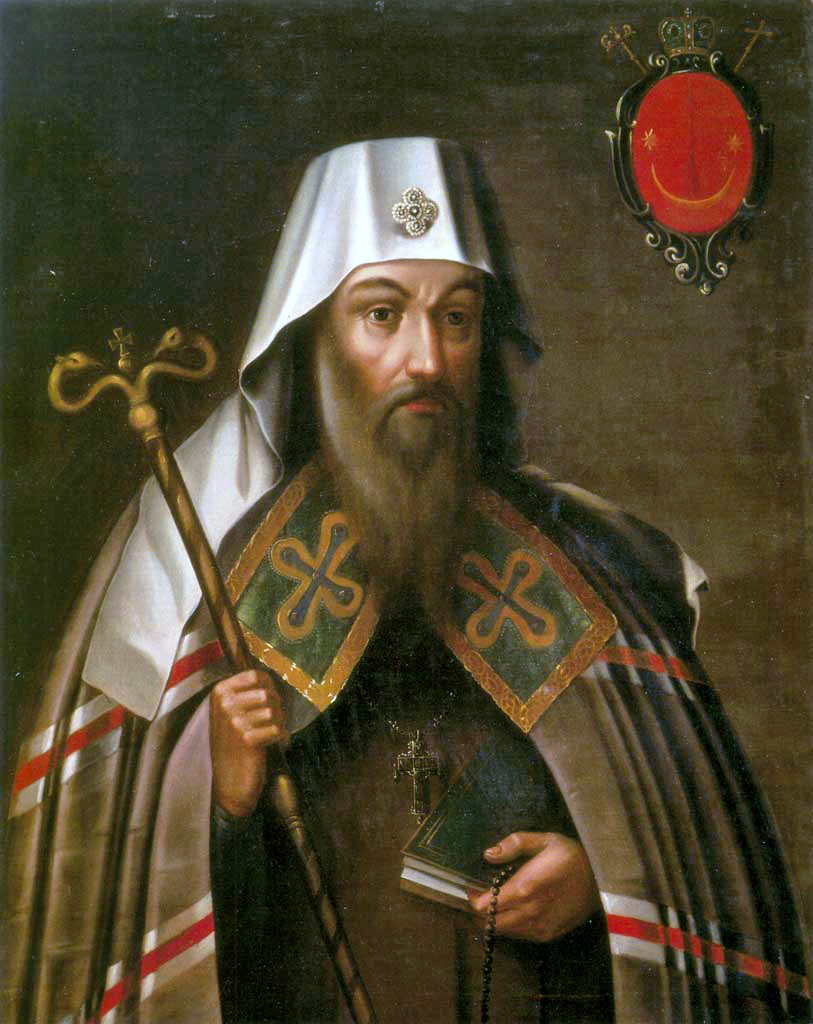
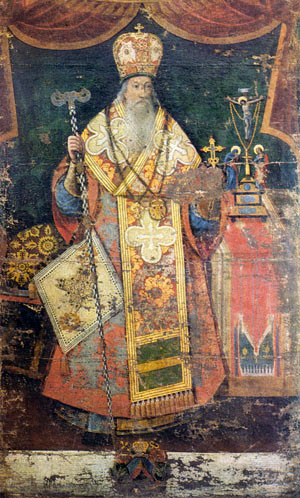
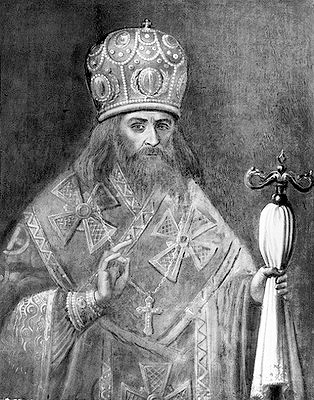
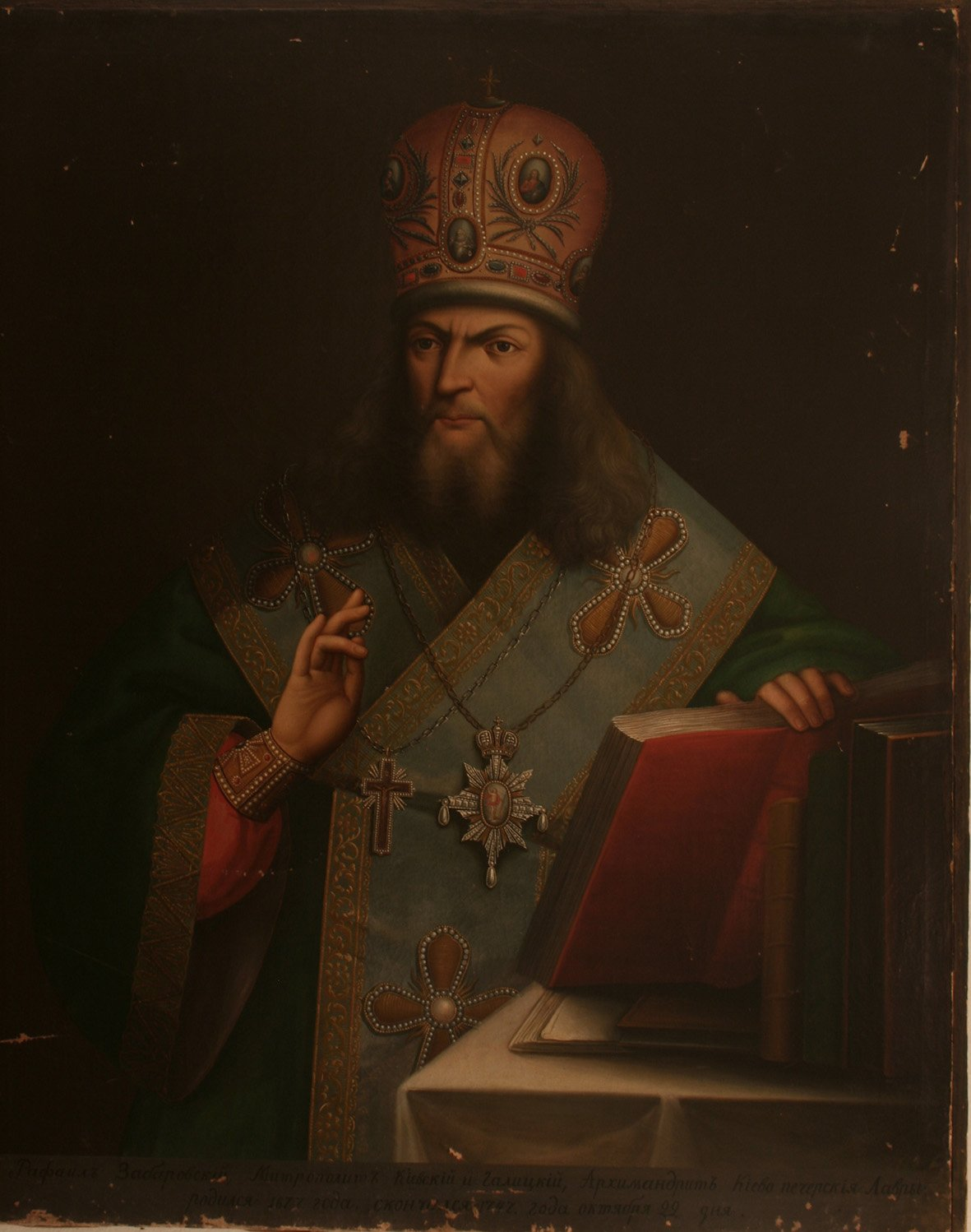
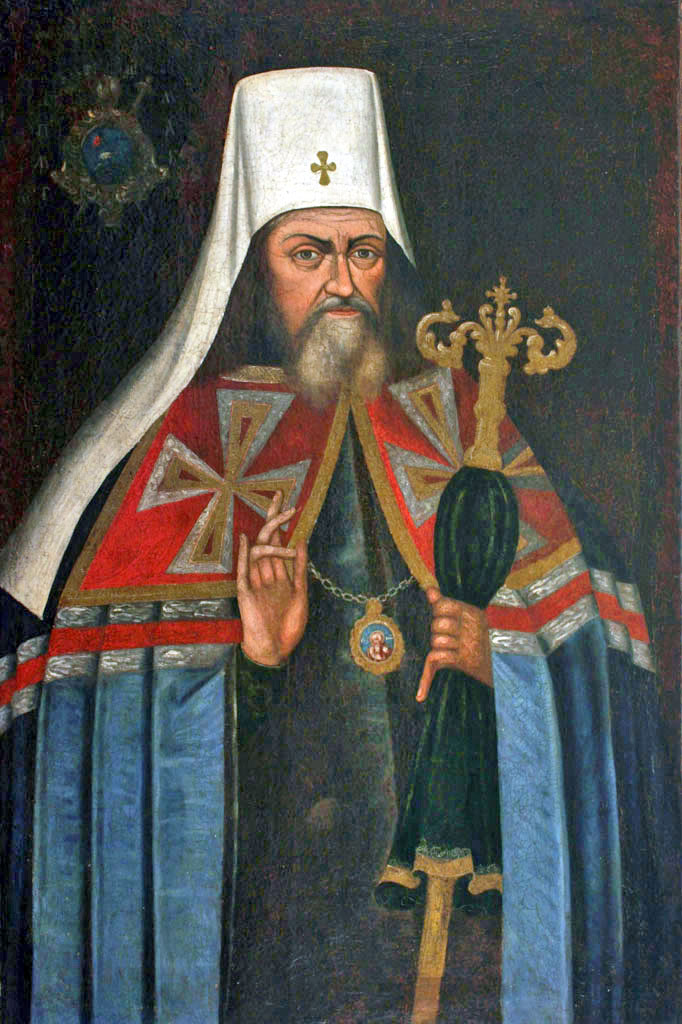
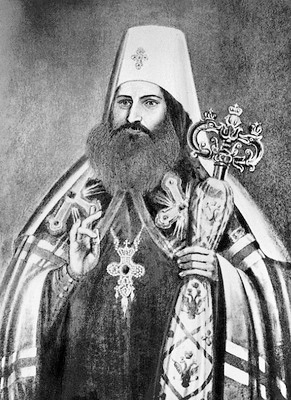
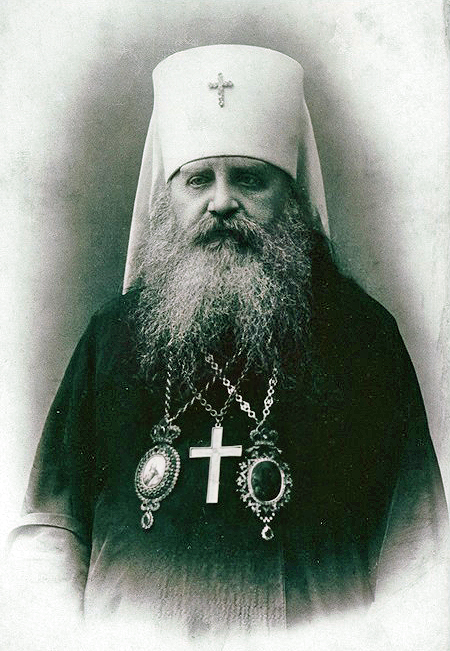
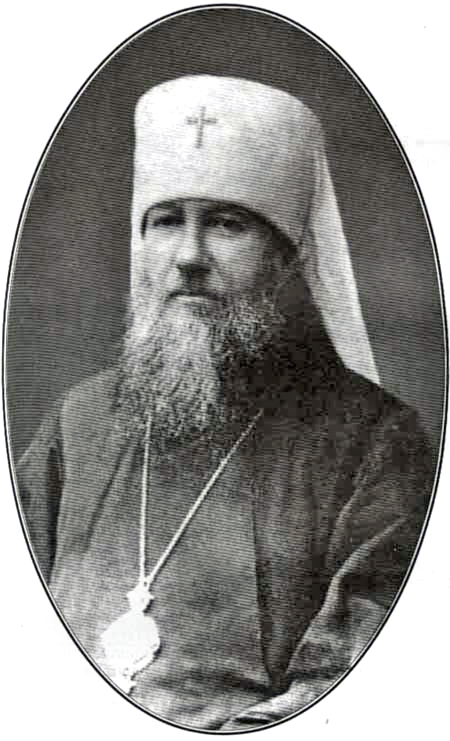
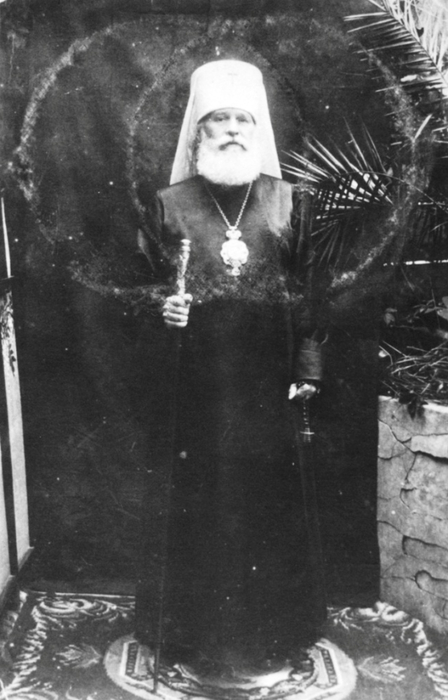
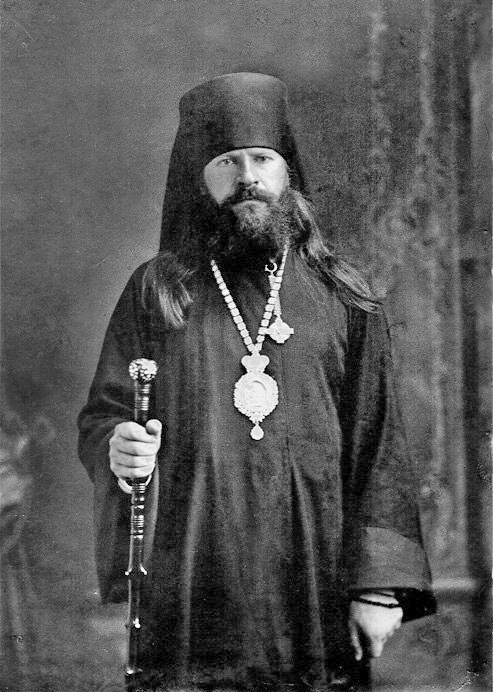
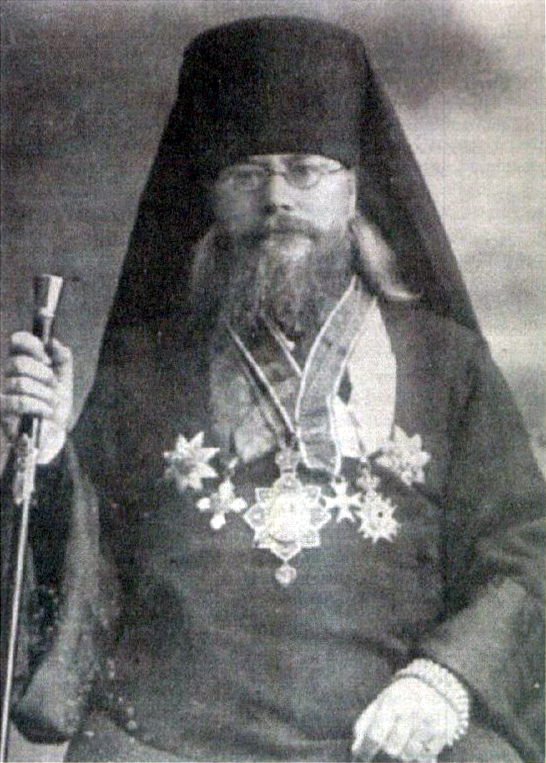
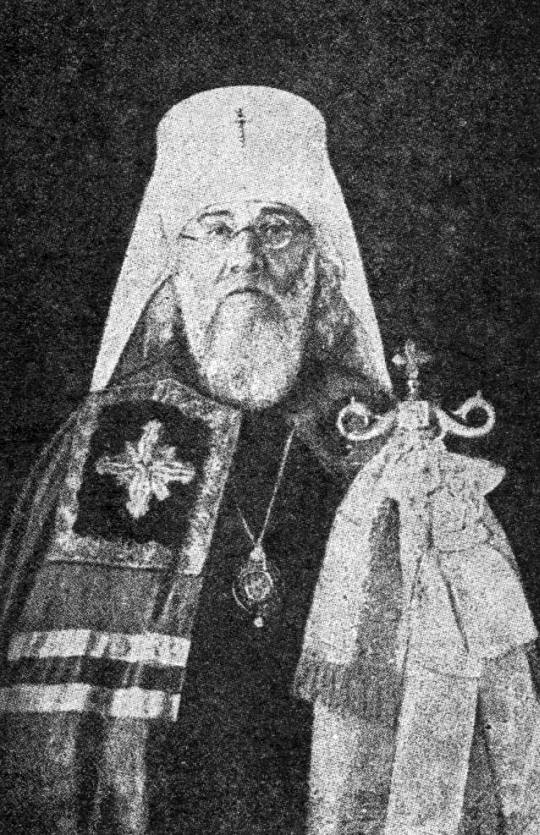
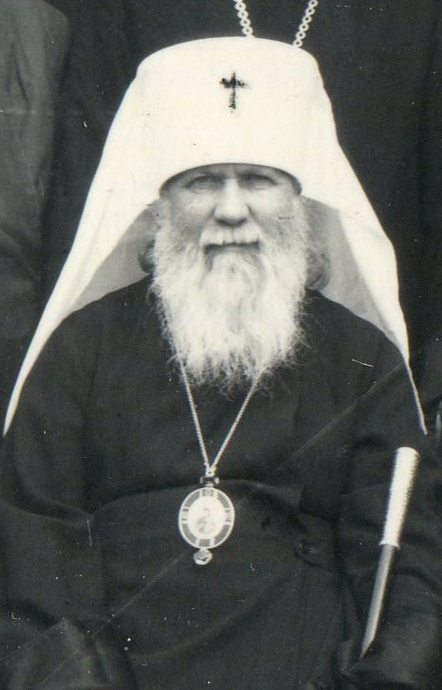
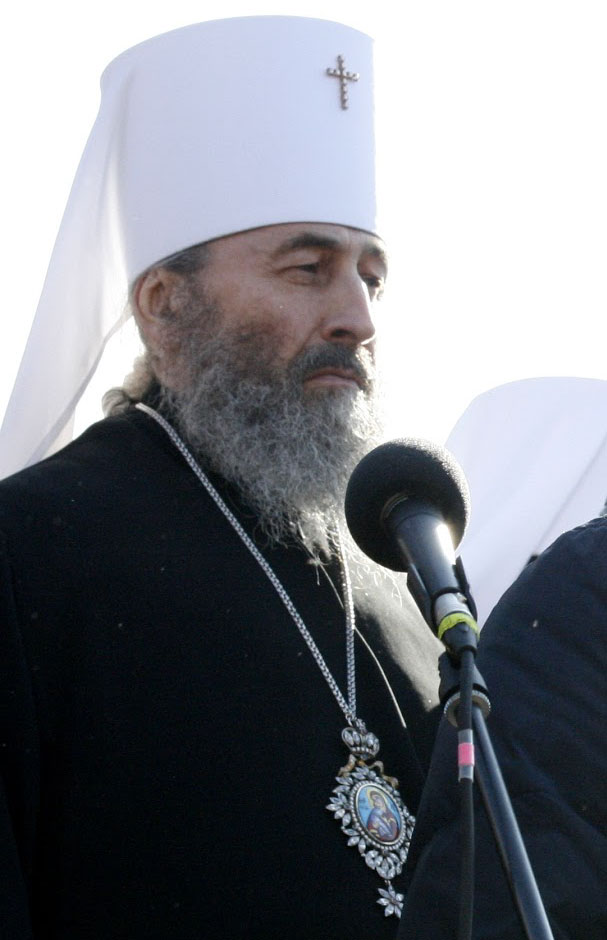
Metropolitan Gedeon	Metropolitan Varlaam	Metropolitan Joasaph	Archbishop Varlaam
Metropolitan Raphael	Metropolitan Timothy	Metropolitan Arseniy	Metropolitan Antony
Metropolitan Michael	Metropolitan Constantine	Metropolitan Nicholas	Metropolitan Alexis
Metropolitan John	Metropolitan Ioasaph	Metropolitan Onuphrius

=== Metropolitan of Kyiv, Galich, and all Little Russia ===
- Metropolitan Gedeon Svyatopolk-Chetvertynsky 1685–1690, the first Metropolitan of Kyiv of the Russian Orthodox Church, until 1688 was titled as the Metropolitan of Kyiv, Galicia, and all Ruthenia
- Metropolitan Varlaam 1690–1707
- Metropolitan Ioasaph 1707–1718
- none 1718–1722
- Archbishop Varlaam 1722–1730
- Metropolitan Raphael 1731–1747, until 1743 as Archbishop
- Metropolitan Timothy 1748–1757
- Metropolitan Arseniy 1757–1770, in 1767 Metropolitan Arseniy became Metropolitan of Kyiv and Halych

Note: in 1770 the office's jurisdiction was reduced to a diocese's administration as Metropolitan of Kyiv and Galicia. The autonomy was liquidated and the church was merged to the Russian Orthodox Church.

=== Exarch of Ukraine ===
Due to emigration of Metropolitan Antony in 1919, until World War II Kyiv eparchy was often administered by provisional bishops. Also because of political situation in Ukraine, the Russian Orthodox Church introduced a new title in its history as the Exarch of Ukraine that until 1941 was not necessary associated with the title of Metropolitan of Kyiv and Halych.

- Metropolitan Mikhail (Yermakov) 1921–1929 (Bishop of Grodno and Brest, 1905–1921; Archbishop of Tobolsk, 1925; and Metropolitan of Kyiv, 1927–1929)
- Metropolitan Konstantin (Dyakov) 1929–1937 (Metropolitan of Kharkiv and Okhtyrka, 1927–1934 and Metropolitan of Kyiv 1934–1937)
- none 1937–1941, exarch was not appointed

=== Metropolitan of Volyn and Lutsk, Exarch of West Ukraine and Belarus ===
On canonical territory of the Polish Orthodox Church of the recently annexed territories of western Ukraine and western Belarus

- Metropolitan Nicholas (Yarushevich) 1940–1941

=== Metropolitan of Kyiv and Halych, Exarch of Ukraine ===
- Metropolitan Nicholas (Yarushevich) 1941–1944
  - During World War II, on the territories of Ukraine occupied by Nazi Germany, Metropolitan Aleksiy organized the Ukrainian Autonomous Orthodox Church that considered itself part of the Russian Orthodox Church.
- Metropolitan John (Sokolov) 1944–1964
- Metropolitan Joasaph (Leliukhin) 1964–1966
- Metropolitan Filaret (Denysenko) 1966–1990

=== Metropolitan of Kyiv and all Ukraine ===
- Metropolitan Filaret (Denysenko) 1990–1992
- Metropolitan Volodymyr (Sabodan) 1992–2014
- Metropolitan Onuphrius (Berezovsky) 2014–Present

== See also ==
- Autocephaly of the Orthodox Church of Ukraine
- 2018 Moscow–Constantinople schism
- List of monasteries of the Ukrainian Orthodox Church (Moscow Patriarchate)
- Transition of church communities to OCU

== Sources ==
- Tomos for Ukraine: rocking the Moscow foundation
- Russian Orthodox Church severs ties with Ecumenical Patriarchate
