= Church of the Ascension, Lukianivka =

Orthodox church in Kyiv Oblast, Ukraine

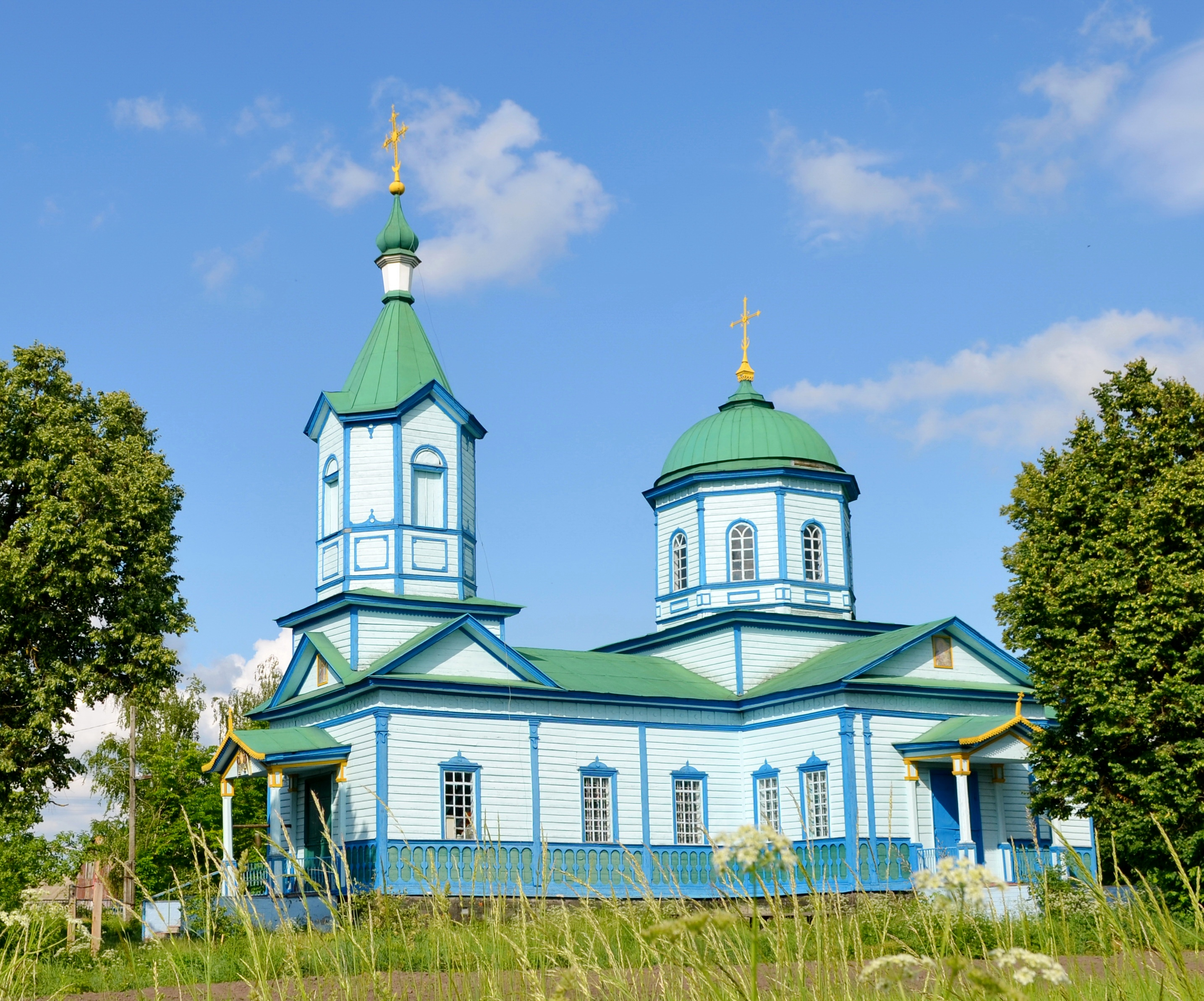
Church of the Ascension, Lukianivka

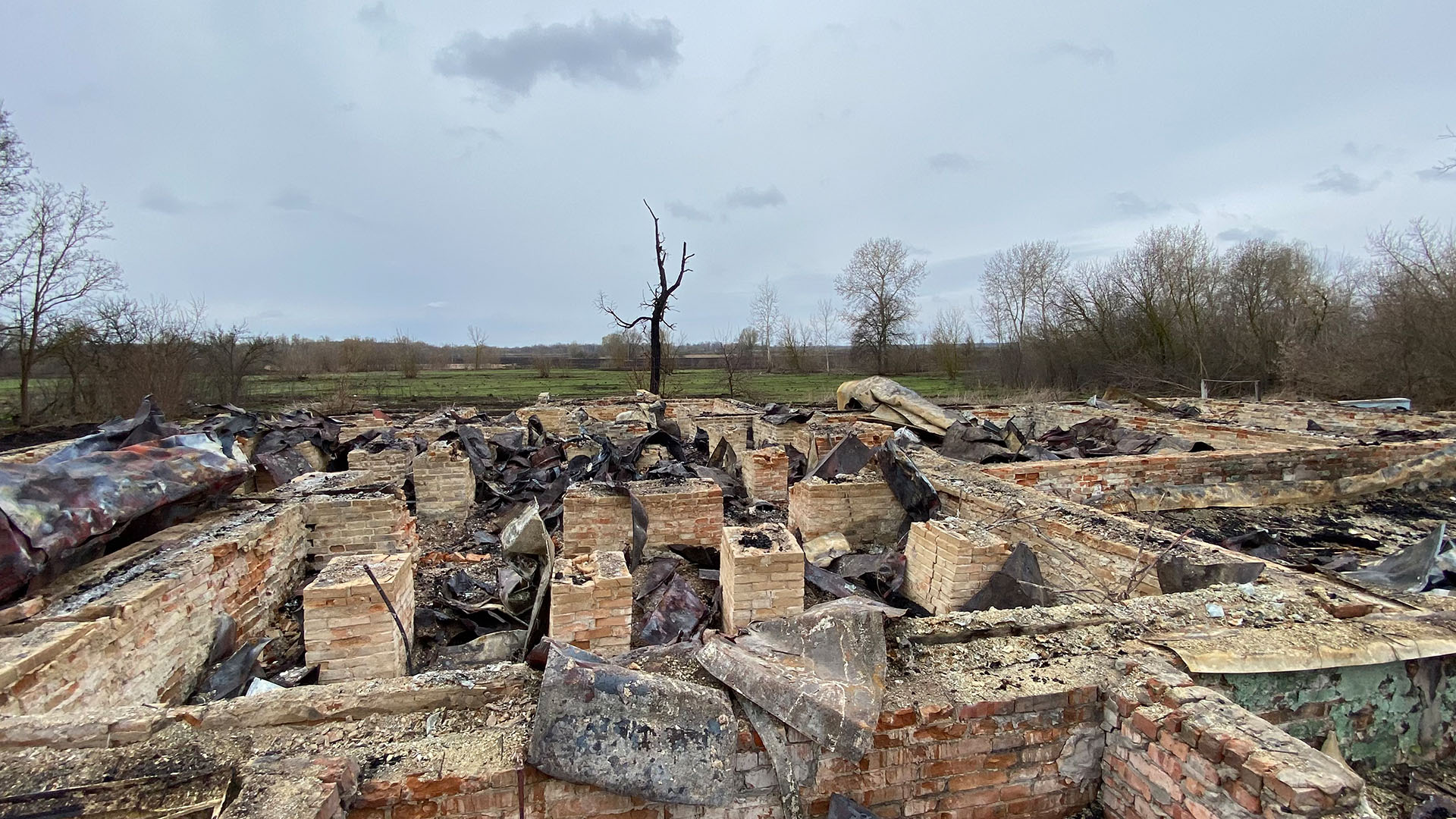
Ruins of the church

Church of the Ascension (Ukrainian: Храм Вознесіння Господнього) was a wooden Orthodox church in the village of Lukianivka, Brovary Raion, Kyiv Oblast, Ukraine.

In 1758, the first church was built in the village. During 1879, the present church was built opposite the old one. The old church was soon dismantled, but the site remained undeveloped. The church was closed in 1930. Worship services were resumed in the church during the German occupation in 1941, and the church had not been closed since. The church belonged to the Boryspil Eparchy of the Ukrainian Orthodox Church.

On 25 March 2022, after the village, after being occupied for a while by the Russian army during the 2022 Russian invasion of Ukraine, was retaken by the Ukrainian Armed Forces, it was discovered that the Russians destroyed the church. According to the priest, "at 4 o'clock in the morning, a Russian tank destroyed this church with four shots."
