= Anatolii Frantsuz =

Ukrainian politician (1954–2025)

Anatoliy Frantsuz
- Анатолій Француз

Governor of Volyn Oblast
- In office 12 June 2002 – 3 February 2005
- Preceded by: Borys Klimchuk
- Succeeded by: Volodymyr Bondar

Personal details
- Born: Anatoliy Yosypovych Frantsuz; 23 March 1954; Monastyryska, Ternopil Oblast, Ukrainian SSR, USSR
- Died: 18 January 2025 (aged 70); Kyiv, Ukraine
- Education: Kyiv College of Ministry of Interior
- Occupation: Military officer

Anatolii Yosypovych Frantsuz (Ukrainian: Анато́лій Йо́сипович Францу́з; 23 March 1954 – 18 January 2025) was a Ukrainian politician. He served as governor of Volyn Oblast from 2002 to 2005.

Frantsuz died in Kyiv on 18 January 2025, at the age of 70.
