= Strength and Honor =

Political party in Ukraine

Strength and Honor Civic Movement Сила і честь
- Leader: Ihor Smeshko
- Founded: 2009
- Headquarters: Kyiv
- Ideology: Conservatism; Constitutional democracy Fiscal conservatism Economic liberalism Pro-Europeanism
- Political position: Centre-right
- Verkhovna Rada: 0 / 450
- Regions: 570 / 43,122

Website
- www.sylaichest.org

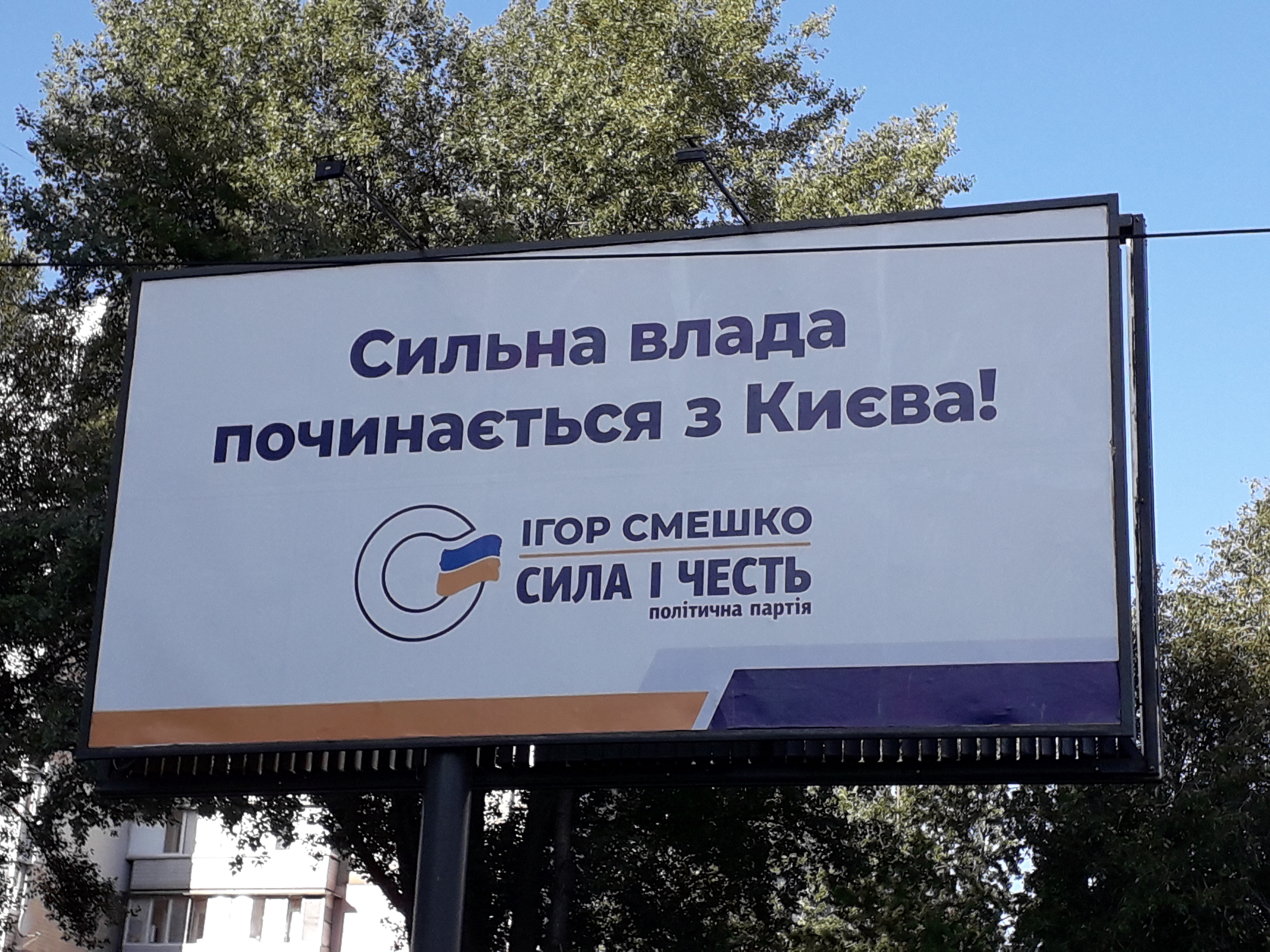
"Strong governance starts with Kyiv" – a Strength and Honor billboard during the 2020 Ukrainian local elections in Kyiv

Strength and Honor (Ukrainian: Сила і Честь, romanized: Syla i Chest', SiCh) is a Ukrainian political party led by Ihor Smeshko.

== History ==
Before the creation of the political party "Strength and Honor" Ihor Smeshko led the NGO "Strength and Honor". The party was officially registered as a political party in December 2009 and has since been led by Smeshko.

The party took part in the 2014 Ukrainian parliamentary election, but was then not formally led by Smeshko since he was the chairman of the Intelligence Committee under the President of Ukraine (Petro Poroshenko). The party election list was instead led by General Oleksander Kichtenko. In the election the party gained 0.08% of the vote and thus could not overcome the 5% election threshold. Smeshko took part in the 2019 Ukrainian presidential election and took sixth place with 6.04% of the vote.

In the first quarter of 2019, the party's financial report stated that the party accounts had only ₴40 thousand (about €1,200). The report also admitted that the party had 14 local organizations, none of which had its own bank account and since the party had not paid salaries, they had to be run by volunteers, or nobody at all.

In June 2019, journalist Dmitry Gordon became the head of the election headquarters of the party Strength and Honor.

The top 10 of the party list for the July 2019 Ukrainian parliamentary election included Smeshko himself, former minister in the Azarov Government Volodymyr Semynozhenko, incumbent MPs Olena Sotnyk, Iryna Sysoyenko and Refat Chubarov and former commander of the Ukrainian army Volodymyr Zamana. But in the election the party won 3.82%, not enough to clear the 5% election threshold and thus no parliamentary seats. The party also failed to win a constituency seat.

In the 2020 Ukrainian local elections, Strength and Honor won 575 local and regional level seats across Ukraine, earning 1.35% of the vote. Its biggest success came in Volyn Oblast in Western Ukraine (Roman Karpyuk, Viktor Halan-Vlashchuk, Liudmyla Stasiuk, Volodymyr Dybel), where it won four seats on the regional parliament, the Volyn Oblast Council.
