= Volodymyr Bondar =

Ukrainian politician (born 1968)

- Володимир Бондар
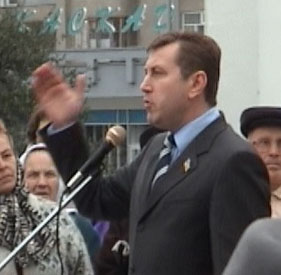

Governor of Volyn Oblast
- In office 2005 – 10 December 2007
- Preceded by: Anatoliy Frantsuz
- Succeeded by: Mykola Romanyuk

Personal details
- Born: Volodymyr Nalkovych Bondar; 16 October 1968 (age 58) Lutsk, Ukrainian SSR, Soviet Union
- Party: Reforms and Order Party; Our Ukraine; United Centre
- Education: East European University

Volodymyr Nalkovych Bondar (Ukrainian: Володимир Налькович Бондар; born 16 October 1968, Lutsk, Ukraine) is a Ukrainian political activist and later politician. Bondar served as a member of the Verkhovna Rada from 2002 to 2005 after taking on various offices at the Volyn Oblast State Administration, and after leading the rada he served as Governor of Volyn Oblast from 2005 to 2007.

== Early life ==
Bondar was born on 16 October 1968 in the city of Lutsk, which was then part of the Ukrainian SSR in the Soviet Union. After studying at Vocational School No. 9 in Lutsk, he initially entered the workforce as a locksmith at the Lutsk State Bearing Plant No. 28 and also completed his mandatory service in the Soviet Army. He then attended the Lesya Ukrainka Volyn National University within the Faculty of Law, and in 1996 earned a degree in history and socio-political disciplines.

== Political career ==
In 1995-2001 he worked at the Volyn Oblast State Administration. He was first part of the Volyn Regional Center of Social Service for the Youth as a specialist, and was then promoted to Head of the Department for Juvenile and Youth Affairs and Deputy Head of the Department for Internal Policy.

In 2002-2005 with breaks Bondar was a member of the Verkhovna Rada representing Reforms and Order Party within the Our Ukraine Bloc of Viktor Yushchenko. He served for constituency no. 22 of the Volyn region, and during this time he served on the committees for relations with Poland and Morocco. In 2005-2007 he served as a Governor of Volyn Oblast. After served as head of the administration, he served as an adviser to Yushchenko and as a chief consultant of the Main Service for Organizaitonal Support of the Seretariat.

From 2010 to 2011 he was then Head of the Center for Municipal Reforms "Lutsk – 1432", the following year of the State Enterprise "Warm House", and then from 2013 to 2016 Deputy Director of the LLC "Lutsk Utility Systems". In November 2016 he was appointed Deputy Head of the State Agency of Forest Resources, a position that ended in 2019.

== Personal life ==
On 17 February 2021 he was approved as a Candidate of Economic Sciences (Doctor of Philosophy) for his thesis on managing forestry production on the basis of a market economy from the Institute of Agroecology and Environmental Management of the National Academy of Sciences of Ukraine.
