= Transition of church communities to OCU =

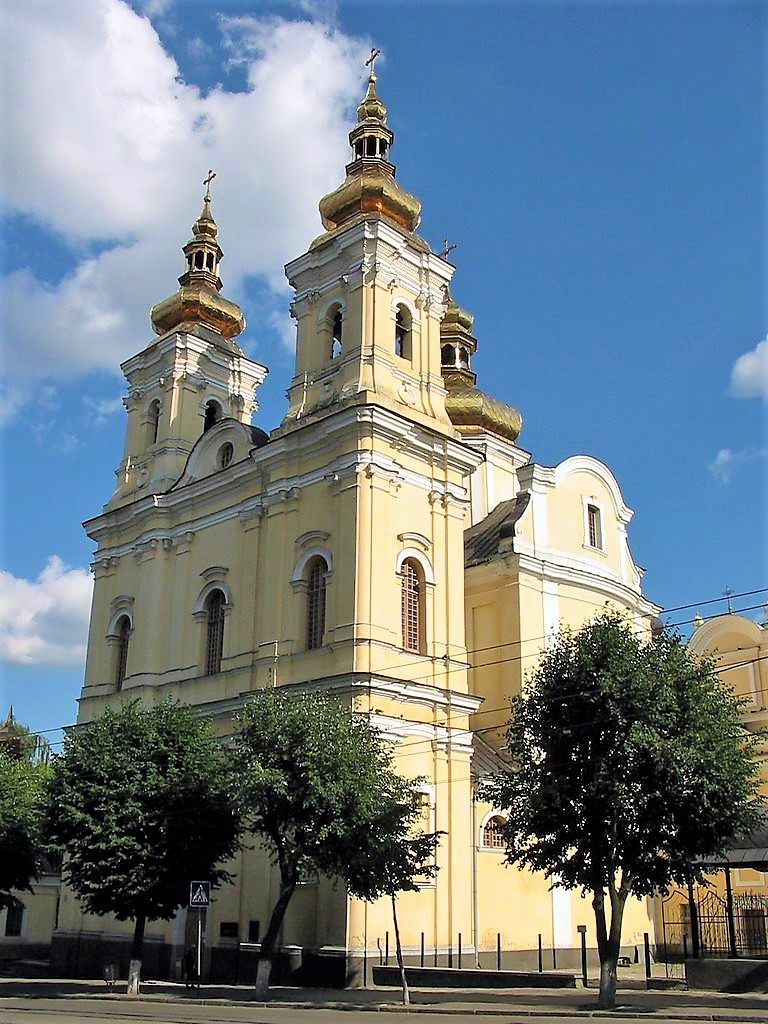
The Transfiguration Cathedral, built in 1779 in Vinnytsia, was one of the first to transfer from the UOC (MP) to the OCU in December 2018

The transition of church communities to the OCU is the process of transition of parishes, previously affiliated to the Ukrainian Orthodox Church (Moscow Patriarchate) (UOC MP), from that metropolis to the Orthodox Church of Ukraine (OCU). This process began with the Unification Council of 15 December 2018, which resulted in the creation of the Orthodox Church of Ukraine. Between 15 December 2018 and 7 November 2022, 1153 parishes (or about 9.5% of the 12,092 parishes the UOC MP had in December 2018) announced their transition from the UOC MP to the OCU.

In 2022 after the start of Russian invasion of Ukraine about 700 more parishes transferred from the UOC (MP) to the Orthodox Church of Ukraine. In general, in four years after the unification council, almost 1,500 religious communities joined the OCU. Throughout 2023 386 UOC (MP) parishes joined the OCU. From December 2023 to April 2024, 96 churches passed to the Orthodox Church of Ukraine.

== Counts of parish transitions ==
There were two periods of transition:

- From the beginning of the Russo-Ukrainian War to the Unification Council, there were transitions from the UOC MP to the Ukrainian Orthodox Church – Kyiv Patriarchate (UOC KP).
- From the Unification Council to date, there were transitions from both the UOC MP and the UOC KP to the UOC.

Prior to the Unification Council, 62 parishes transferred from the UOC MP to the UOC KP. Counts by year: 23 in 2014; 22 in 2015; 5 in 2016, 10 in 2017; 2 in 2018.(uk) On 10 December 2018, the UOC MP published its annual report stating that it had 12,092 parishes by the end of 2018 (2017: 12,069). From 15 December 2018, the transition of UOC MP parishes to the OCU occurred as follows, numerically by month:

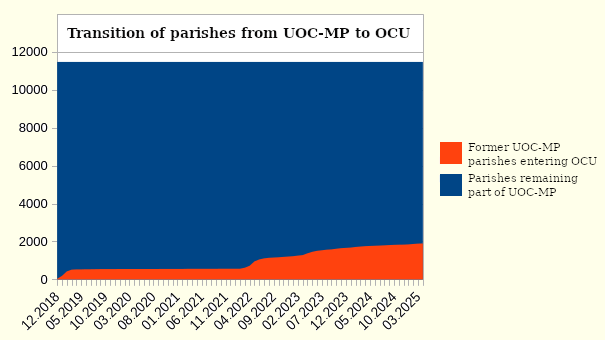
Transition of parishes from Ukrainian Orthodox Church (Moscow Patriarchate) to the Orthodox Church of Ukraine

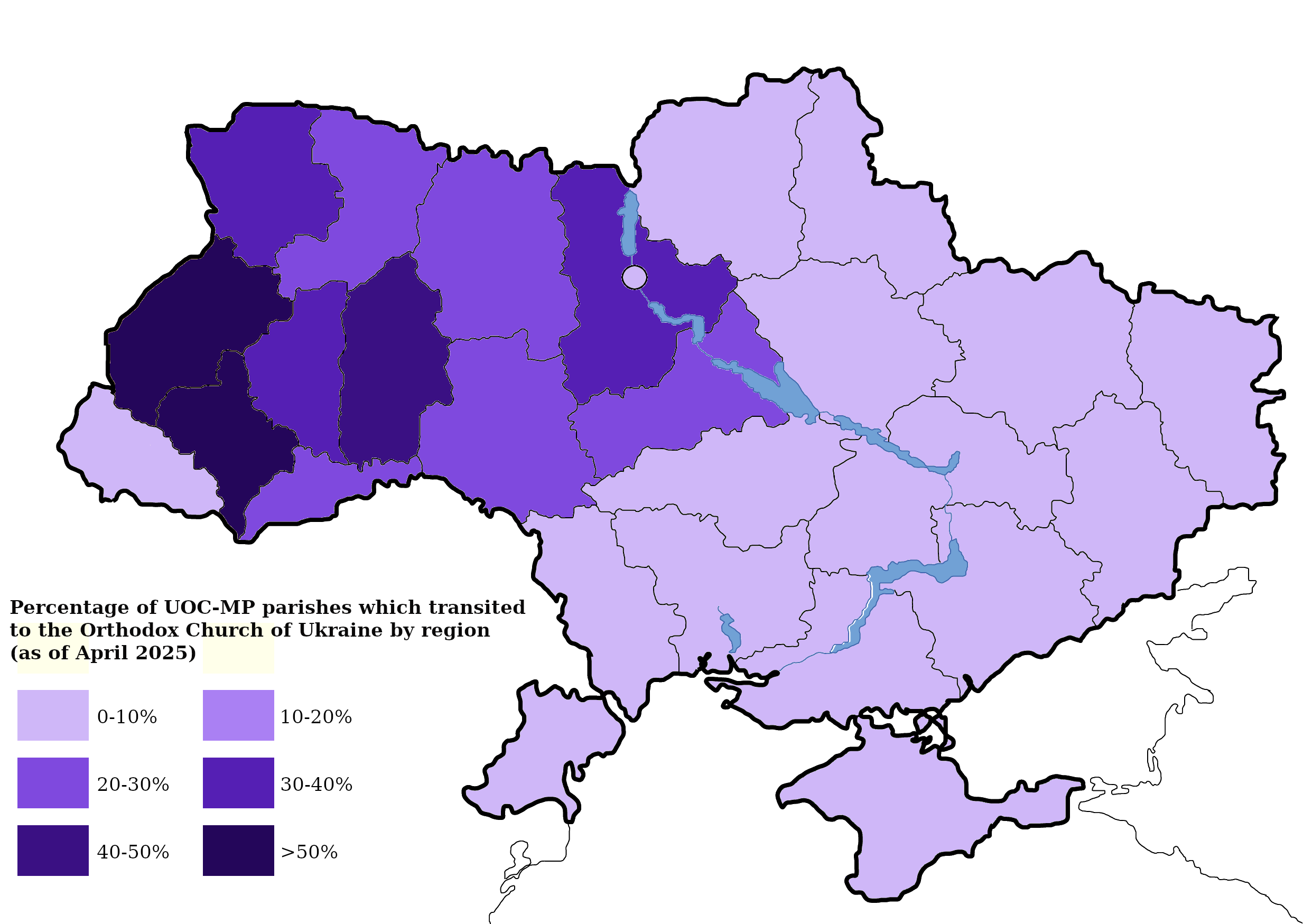
Percentage of transited parishes by region

No.	Month	Number of parishes which left the UOC (MP)	
No.	Month	In month	Cumulative
1	December 2018	35	35
2	January 2019	152	187
3	February 2019	234	421
4	March 2019	93	514
5	April 2019	14	528
6	May 2019	1	529
7	June 2019	7	536
8	July 2019	1	537
9	August 2019	3	540
10	September 2019	4	544
11	November 2019	1	545
12	December 2019	2	547
13	January 2020	1	548
14	February 2020	1	549
15	July 2020	1	550
16	August 2020	1	551
17	October 2020	1	552
18	February 2021	1	553
19	March 2021	5	558
20	May 2021	2	560
21	October 2021	3	563
22	February 2022	1	564
23	March 2022	54	618
24	April 2022	104	722
25	May 2022	229	951
26	June 2022	104	1055
27	July 2022	55	1110
28	August 2022	30	1140
29	September 2022	14	1154
30	October 2022	13	1167
31	November 2022	19	1186
32	December 2022	16	1202
33	January 2023	19	1221
34	February 2023	31	1252
35	March 2023	24	1276
36	April 2023	95	1371
37	May 2023	73	1444
38	June 2023	50	1494
39	July 2023	27	1511
40	August 2023	30	1541
41	September 2023	16	1557
42	October 2023	22	1579
43	November 2023	30	1643
44	December 2023	15	1658
45	January 2024	16	1674
46	February 2024	32	1706
47	March 2024	22	1728
48	April 2024	20	1748
49	May 2024	14	1761
50	June 2024	10	1771
51	July 2024	10	1781
52	August 2024	12	1793
53	September 2024	13	1806
54	October 2024	11	1817
55	November 2024	8	1825
56	December 2024	4	1829
57	January 2025	11	1840
58	February 2025	15	1855
59	March 2025	22	1891
60	April 2025	7	1898
61	May 2025	11	1909
62	June 2025	8	1917
63	July 2025	5	1922
64	August 2025	4	1926
65	September 2025	2	1928
66	November 2025	4	1932
67	December 2025	3	1935
68	January 2026	6	1941
69	February 2026	3	1944

== See also ==
- Religion in Ukraine

== Sources ==
- Explore Ukraine's Contemporary Religious Landscape in MAPA's New Story Map Journal // Harvard Ukrainian Research Institute, 8 February 2020
- Religious pluralism in Ukraine // harvard-cga.maps.arcgis.com
- "Як Московська церква рятує себе в Україні. Десять прийомів". glavcom.ua. Главком. 2019-02-01. Archived from the original on 2019-06-25.
- "Скільки парафій має УПЦ МП у кожній області України. Інфографіка". www.volynnews.com. Волинські новини. 2019-02-14.
- "В уряді розказали, як Москва гальмує перехід громад до ПЦУ". risu.org.ua. Релігійно-інформаційна служба України. 2019-12-04.
- Карта переходів громад з московського патріархату станом на січень 2025 року
