= Borys Klimchuk (politician) =

Ukrainian politician (1951–2014)

- Борис Клімчук

Governor of Volyn Oblast
- In office 4 November 2010 – 5 February 2014
- Preceded by: Mykola Romanyuk
- Succeeded by: Oleksandr Baskhalenko

Ambassador of Ukraine to Azerbaijan
- In office 15 April 2008 – 26 March 2010
- Preceded by: Stepan Volkovetsky
- Succeeded by: Myroslav Bashschuk

Ambassador of Ukraine to Lithuania
- In office 11 February 2004 – 15 April 2008
- Preceded by: Mykola Derkach
- Succeeded by: Ihor Prokopchuk

Advisor to the President of Ukraine
- In office 12 June 2002 – 11 February 2004

Governor of Volyn Oblast
- In office 7 July 1995 – 12 June 2002
- Preceded by: Anatoliy Frantsuz
- Succeeded by: Yuriy Lenartovych

Personal details
- Born: Borys Petrovych Klimchuk; 18 March 1951 Boloskhy, Ukraine, Soviet Union
- Died: 2 September 2014 (aged 63) Berlin, Germany
- Party: Party of Regions

Borys Petrovych Klimchuk (Ukrainian: Борис Петрович Клімчук; 18 March 1951 – 2 September 2014) was a Ukrainian politician who had served as the Governor of Volyn Oblast from 2010 to 2014, having already served from 1995 to 2002.

== Biography ==
Klimchuk was born on 18 March 1951 in the village of Voloshky, Kovelsky district, Volyn Oblast to parents Petro and Olha. He graduated from Kharkiv State University. M. Gorky in 1974 with a degree in geographer, teacher of geography.

In 1974 he worked as a teacher at the Ostroh boarding school in Rivne Oblast. Between 1975 and 1990 he was a geography teacher in schools in the city of Kovel. From August 1975 to August 1980, he was a teacher at Kovel Secondary School No. 7. From August 1980 to January 1982, he was the director of Kovel 8-year school No. 9. From January 1982 to June 1982, he was an engineer at the Kovelsilmash plant. From June 1982 to June 1990, he was the director of Kovel Secondary School No. 11.

On 1 December 1990, he was elected a member of the regional committee of the Communist Party. From June 1992 to April 1998, he was the Chairman of the Volyn Oblast Council.

On 7 July 1995, Klimchuk became the Governor of Volyn Oblast.

In 1998, he graduated from the Kharkiv National Law Academy Yaroslav the Wise with a degree in law.

He left office on 12 June 2002 as he was appointed an advisor to President Leonid Kuchma

On 11 February 2004, Klimchuk was appointed the Ambassador of Ukraine to Lithuania.

On 15 April 2008, Klimchuk became the Ambassador of Ukraine to Azerbaijan.

On 26 March 2010, Klimchuk became governor of Volyn Oblast for a second term.

During the mass protests that took place in Ukraine in late 2013 and early 2014, Klimchuk was forced to resign via a resignation letter.

On 24 January 2014, Klimchuk resigned for the sake of preserving peace and preventing protests from intensifying. At the same time, he asked the leaders of the Lutsk Euromaidan to write statements that they will not call on citizens to use violence. Klimchuk emphasized that the document was registered and sent to the capital to the Presidential Administration. The protesters, who were standing under the walls of the cabinet, greeted the governor's decision with shouts of "Well done!" On 5 February, The resignation was accepted by president Viktor Yanukovych, and was dismissed from office.

== Death ==
Borys Petrovych Klimchuk died on 2 September 2014 in Berlin after a serious illness, where he was treated at the "Charite" clinic.

He was buried in the village of Volya-Lyubotivska next to the graves of his parents.
