= Oleksandr Savchenko =

Ukrainian politician

- Олександр Савченко
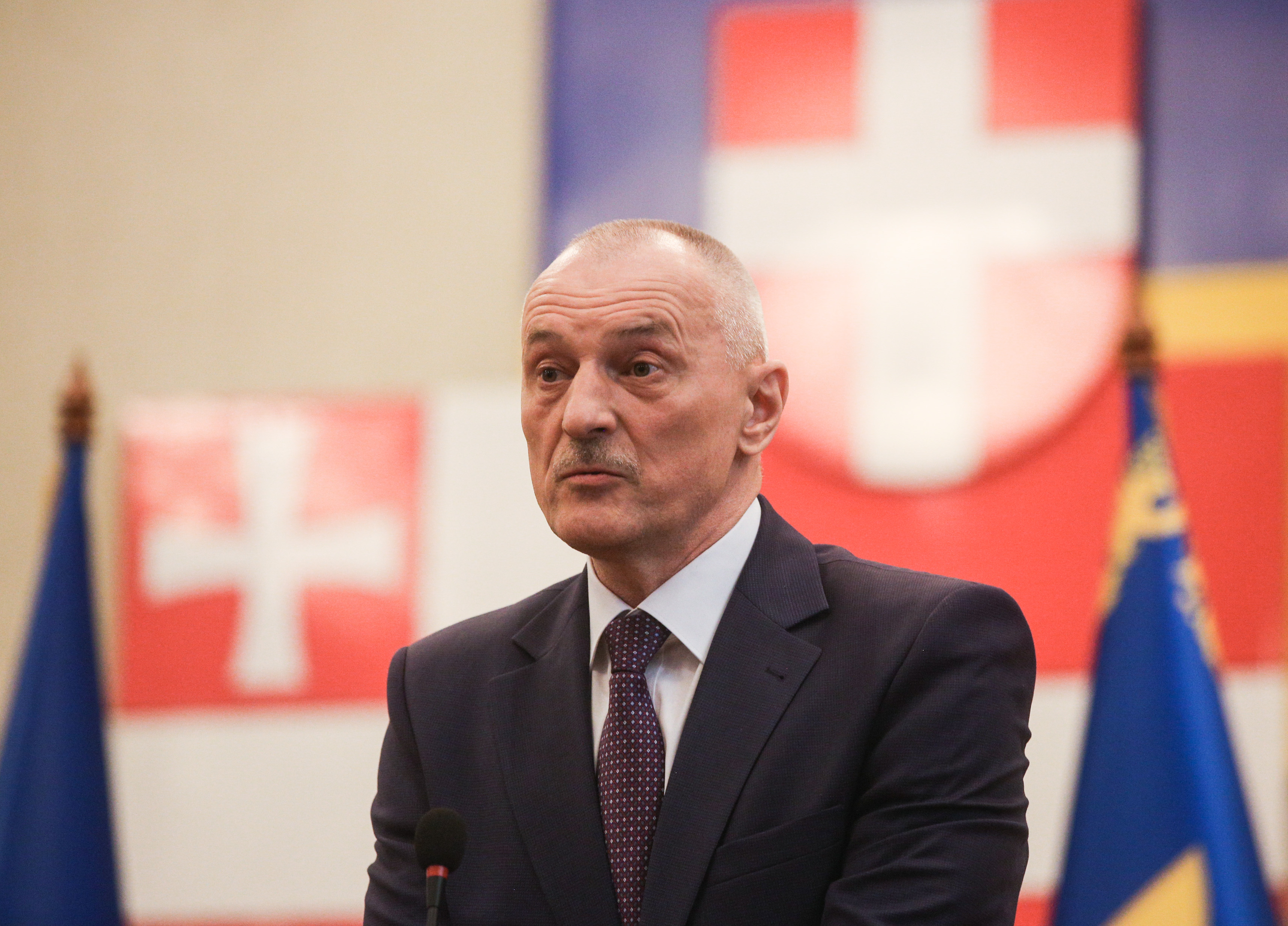

Governor of Volyn Oblast
- In office 23 March 2018 – 11 June 2019
- Preceded by: Volodymyr Hunchyk
- Succeeded by: Oleksandr Kyrychuk (acting)

First Deputy Chairman of Kyiv Oblast
- In office 19 January 2017 – 28 November 2017

Personal details
- Born: Oleksandr Illich Savchenko; 5 August 1957 (age 68) Nyzhchi Vereshchaky, Ukraine, Soviet Union
- Party: UKROP
- Spouse: Iryna Ivanivna
- Children: Nadiya

Oleksandr Illich Savchenko (Ukrainian: Олександр Ілліч Савченко; born on 5 August 1957), is a Ukrainian politician who was the Governor of Volyn Oblast from 23 March 2018 until 11 June 2019.

== Biography ==
Oleksandr Savchenko was born in a village of Nyzhchi Vereshchaky on 5 August 1957.

In 1979, he graduated from the Kirovograd Institute of Agricultural Engineering (faculty "Construction and Road Machinery and Equipment"), and have obtained the qualification of a mechanical engineer. The same year, he worked as a mechanical engineer of the Krasnodar Krasnoyarsk Production Association "Reinforced Concrete".

From 1979 to 1981, he served in the ranks of the Armed Forces of the USSR.

From 1981 to 1984, he worked as an engineer of the automobile department of the Gozo Department of Internal Affairs of the city of Kyiv.

He also served in the Internal Affairs of Ukraine from 1984 until 2005.

In 1994, he graduated from the Ukrainian Academy of Internal Affairs, specialising in Jurisprudence, and qualified as a lawyer.

From 2005 to 2007, he was the Director of the Department of the State Service of Protection of the Ministry of Internal Affairs of Ukraine.

From 2007, he was promoted as Deputy Minister of Internal Affairs of Ukraine and Chief of Public Security Police of the Ministry of Internal Affairs of Ukraine until the end of 2010.

From 2012 to 2014, Savchenko worked as assistant-counselor of the People's Deputy of Ukraine, Viktor Razvadovsky. In 2014, he also worked as the Director of the Department of Economic Security and Risk Management of the National Joint-Stock Company Naftogaz Ukrainy.

He was promoted with the same job as a director until 2016.

From January 19 to November 28, 2017, Oleksandr Savchenko is the first deputy chairman of the Kyiv Oblast. He was released on his own accord.

On March 22, 2018, Savchenko was appointed Governor of Volyn Oblast. He officially took office on 23 March.

Savchenko is a member of the political party UKROP.

Since 11 June 2019 acting Governor of Volyn Oblast is Oleksandr Kyrychuk.

== Family ==
He is married to Iryna Ivanivna, and has a daughter, Nadiya.

== Personal life ==
According to Mykhaylo Svystovych's memoirs, Savchenko in 2001 personally ordered him to detain with a bag of empty bottles, which, according to the version he put forward, was given to replenish his mobile phone. False version of the detainee failed to prove and Svystovych was released, but the bottles were confiscated.

He has a collection of Swiss watches and a Vertu phone.
