= Roman Romanyuk (politician, born 1985) =

Ukrainian politician (born 1985)

- Роман Романюк

Governor of Volyn Oblast (acting)
- Incumbent
- Assumed office 12 January 2026
- Preceded by: Ivan Rudnytsky

Deputy Head of the Volyn Oblast State Administration
- Incumbent
- Assumed office 3 January 2025

Personal details
- Born: Roman Vyacheslavovych Romanyuk; 24 June 1985 (age 41) Lutsk, Ukrainian SSR, Soviet Union (now Ukraine)

Roman Vyacheslavovych Romanyuk (Ukrainian: Роман В'ячеславович Романюк; born on 24 June 1985 in Lutsk), is a Ukrainian politician who has been acting governor of Volyn Oblast since 12 January 2026.

== Biography ==
Roman Romanyuk was born on 24 June 1985 in Lutsk. In 2006, he graduated from the Lutsk National Technical University, majoring in economics and entrepreneurship, with a bachelor's degree in finance. In 2007, he obtained the degree of specialist in finance. In 2018, he graduated from Lesya Ukrainka Volyn National University, majoring in law. In 2021, he obtained a Candidate of Sciences degree in economics.

From May 2007 to February 2010, he worked as the manager of the Volyn Regional Directorate branch, as well as the acting manager of the Cathedral branch. He was then director of the Cathedral Branch of Pravex Bank. He then headed Pravex's Cathedral Branch of the Retail Western Regional Center from February 2010 to February 2012. From March 2012 to January 2017, he was an assistant director of Bogdan Corporation's subsidiary company "Auto Assembly Plant No. 1," then headed the regional employment center from February 2017 to July 2022. From July 2022 to February 2024, he worked as the Head of the Secretariat of the Commissioner for Human Rights of the Verkhovna Rada.

On 3 January 2025, Romanyuk became the deputy head of the Volyn Oblast State Administration. On 12 January 2026, in accordance with the Presidential Decree, he became the acting governor.
