= Ivan Rudnytsky (politician) =

Ukrainian politician

- Іван Рудницький

Governor of Volyn Oblast
- In office 8 November 2024 – 12 January 2026
- Preceded by: Yuriy Pohulyaiko
- Succeeded by: Roman Romanyuk (acting)

Personal details
- Born: 14 January 1978 (age 48) Drohobych, Lviv Oblast, Ukrainian SSR, Soviet Union (now Ukraine)

Ivan Lvovych Rudnytsky (Ukrainian: Іван Львович Рудницький; born on 14 January 1974), is a Ukrainian politician and security officer who his currently the Governor of Volyn Oblast since 8 November 2024.

== Biography ==
Ivan Rudnytsky was born on 14 January 1978 in Drohobych of the Lviv Oblast.

His father, Lev Ivanovych (born in 1949) was a serviceman of the Soviet Army, a resident of Drohobych.

In 2000, he completed his studies at the Drogobych State Pedagogical University with a degree in pedagogy and methodology of secondary education, “English language and literature”, “French language and literature”. Received the qualifications of a teacher of English and French and foreign literature

In 2008, he graduated from the Ivan Franco National University of Lviv, specializing in law with a lawyer.

Between 2014. and 2015, sources mentioned him as he had been the deputy chief of the USBU in the Transcarpathian region, the head of the main department for the fight against corruption and organized crime. From 2015 to 2018, he held a similar position in the Lviv Oblast.

As a deputy chief of the USBU in the Lviv region since 2015, he declared 227.4 thousand UAH income. His wife Yuliya Naumchuk-Rudnitskaya did not work, except 15.3 thousand UAH of material assistance, but uses the 2014 BMW X5 car.

It was related to the persecution of members of the "Autonomous Resistance" of Lviv, who was authorized in 2016, by the then head of the Lviv USBU Andriy Tkachuk.

From July 2019 to July 2022, he was the Head of the Department of Security Service of Ukraine in the Zakapartia Oblast.

From July 2022 to May 2024, he was the head of the SBU department in the Poltava Oblast, in May 2024 he was appointed head of the Department of the SBU of the Volyn region.

On 8 November 2024, Rudnytsky became the Governor the Volyn Oblast.

== Family ==
He is married and has one child.
