= Governor of Volyn Oblast =

- Seal of Volyn Oblast
- Incumbent; Roman Romanyuk (acting) since 12 January 2026
- Residence: Lutsk
- Term length: Four years
- Inaugural holder: Volodymyr Blazhenchuk; 1945
- Formation: 1992 as Presidential representative
- Website: Government of Volyn Oblast

The governor of Volyn Oblast is the head of executive branch for the Volyn Oblast in Ukraine.

The office of governor is an appointed position, with officeholders being appointed by the president of Ukraine, on recommendation from the prime minister of Ukraine, to serve a four-year term.

The official residence for the governor is located in Lutsk. Since 2 December 2019 the governor is Yuriy Pohulyaiko.

== Governors ==
- Volodymyr Blazhenchuk (1992–1994, as the Presidential representative)
- Yuriy Lenartovych (1994, acting until 1994 as the Presidential representative)
- Borys Klimchuk (1995–2002, as the Governor)
- Anatoliy Frantsuz (2002–2005)
- Volodymyr Bondar (2005–2007)
- Mykola Romanyuk (2007–2010, acting to 2007)
- Borys Klimchuk (2010–2014)
- Oleksandr Bashkalenko (2014)
- Hryhoriy Pustovit (2014)
- Volodymyr Hunchyk (2014–2018)
- Oleksandr Savchenko (2018–2019)
- Oleksandr Kyrychuk (acting) (2019-) was (acting) Governor.
- Yuriy Pohulyaiko (2019–2024)
- Ivan Rudntksy (2024-2026)
- Roman Romanyuk (acting) (2026-present)

== Sources ==
- World Statesmen.org
