= Mykola Romanyuk =

- Микола Романюк

Mayor of Lutsk
- In office 4 November 2010 – 3 February 2017
- Preceded by: Bohdan Shyba
- Succeeded by: Ihor Polishchuk

Governor of Volyn Oblast
- In office 10 December 2007 – 26 March 2010
- Preceded by: Volodymyr Bondar
- Succeeded by: Borys Klimchuk

Personal details
- Born: Mykola Yaroslavovych Romanyuk; 24 August 1958 Zolochivka, Ukraine, Soviet Union
- Died: 3 February 2017 (aged 58) Lutsk, Ukraine
- Party: Independent

Mykola Yaroslavovych Romanyuk (Ukrainian: Микола Ярославович Романюк; 24 August 1958 - 3 February 2017), was a Ukrainian politician who served as the mayor of Lutsk from 2010 until his death in 2017.

He had also served as the Governor of Volyn Oblast from 2007 to 2010.

He had also a member of the Volyn Regional Council for three convocations.

== Biography ==
Mykola Romanyuk was born on 24 August 1958 in the village of Zolochivka, Mlyniv district, Rivne region.

He had two higher educations in the specialties of "technological engineer" at Lviv Forestry Institute, graduated in 1982, and "economist" from the Lutsk Industrial Institute, graduated in 1995.

He started working in 1975 as a worker at the Lutsk Furniture Factory. After obtaining higher education, he returned to the same enterprise, where he worked as a foreman from 1982 to 1983.

From 1983 to 1993, he worked at the Komsomol, at the party and youth work. At that time, he included works as an instructor, and headed of the department of Komsomol organizations of the Lutsk City Committee of the Komsomol from 1983 to 1984. He was promoted to first secretary of the Lutsk City Committee of the Komsomol from March 1984 to 1988. He became the head of the propaganda and agitation department of the Lutsk City Committee of the Communist Party of Ukraine in 1988. Then he became the first secretary of the Volyn regional committee of the LKSM of Ukraine from 1988 to 1991, and then promoted as the chairman of the youth and sports committee of the Volyn regional executive committee from 1991 to 1992. He became the deputy head of the youth and sports department of the Volyn regional state administration from 1992 to 1993.

He had been a member of the Volyn Regional Council of three convocations.

From February 1993 to November 2007, Romanyuk headed the Volyn Main Regional Department of Privatbank CJSC.

On 10 December 2007, by decree of the President of Ukraine, Viktor Yushchenko, Romanyuk was appointed Governor of Volyn Oblast. He was dismissed on 26 March 2010.

From April 2010 to November 2010, he was the director of the Volyn Main Regional Department of the Public Joint-Stock Company CB "Privatbank".

In the elections on 31 October 2010, Romanyuk was elected mayor of Lutsk. He took office on 4 November.

He was reelected in 2015, running from the Petro Poroshenko Bloc, gaining 55.69% of the vote in the second round (37,575 votes).

On 31 January 2017, Romanyuk was hospitalized in the intensive care unit of the Lutsk City Clinical Hospital in serious condition. He died on 3 February without regaining consciousness. On 5 February, after a memorial service at the Holy Trinity Cathedral in Lutsk and a farewell ceremony at the Taras Shevchenko Volyn Regional Academic Music and Drama Theater, Romanyuk was buried in Zolochivka.

== Family ==
He was married and had two sons.
