= Volyn Oblast Council =

Legislature of Volyn Oblast, Ukraine

Volyn Oblast Council Волинська обласна рада
- 8th convocation

Type
- Type: Unicameral

Leadership
- Chairman: Hryhorii Nedopad, For the Future since 25 November 2020
- 1st Deputy Chairman: Yurii Polishchuk, Svoboda since 26 July 2019
- Deputy Chairman: Hryhorii Pustovit, Batkivshchyna since 25 November 2020

Structure
- Seats: 64
- Political groups: For the Future (22); European Solidarity (9); Batkivshchyna (9); Servant of the People (8); Svoboda (7); Agrarian Party (5); Strength and Honor (4)

Elections
- Last election: 25 October 2020

Meeting place
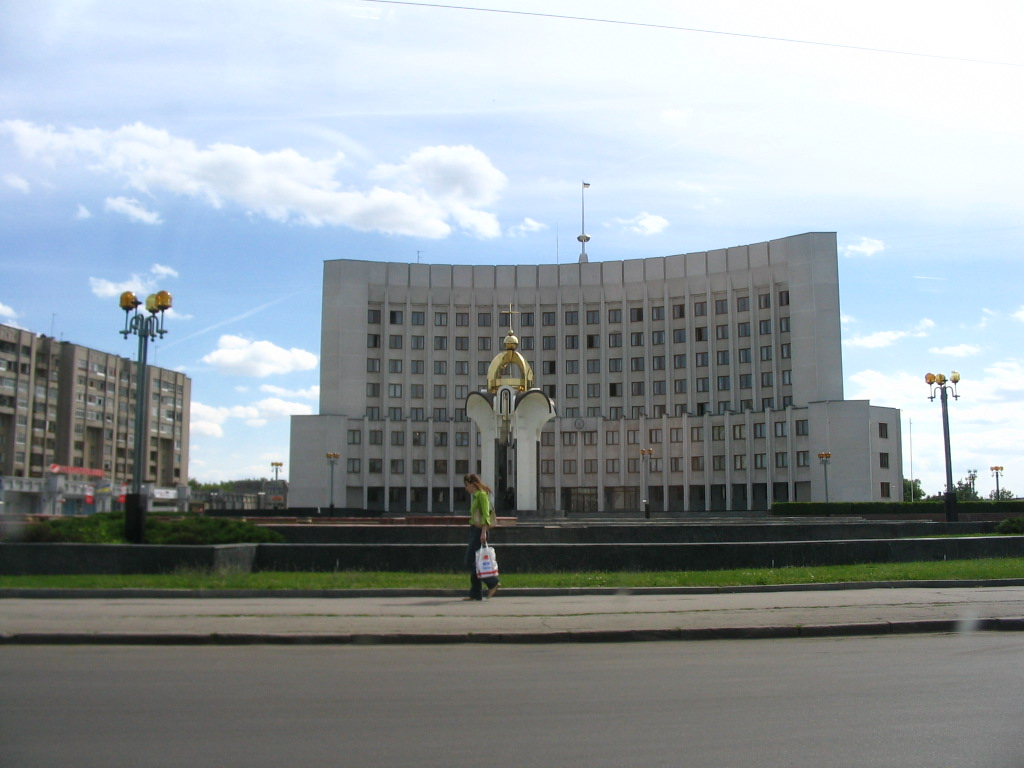
- Lutsk, Volyn Oblast

Website
- https://new.volynrada.gov.ua/

The Volyn Oblast Council (Ukrainian: Волинська обласна рада) is the regional oblast council (parliament) of the Volyn Oblast (province) located in western Ukraine.

Council members are elected for five year terms. In order to gain representation in the council, a party must gain more than 5 percent of the total vote.

As of August 2025, the opposition consists of 5 deputies from the Agrarian Party of Ukraine and 9 deputies from "European Solidarity". The situational coalition consists of "For the Future", "Fatherland", "Servant of the People", "Freedom", "Strength and Honor".

== Recent elections ==
=== 2020 ===
Distribution of seats after the 2020 Ukrainian local elections

- 22 For the Future
- 9 European Solidarity
- 9 Fatherland
- 8 Servant of the People
- 7 Svoboda
- 5 Agrarian Party
- 4 Strength and Honor

Election date was 25 October 2020

=== 2015 ===
Distribution of seats after the 2015 Ukrainian local elections

- 17 UKROP
- 13 Solidarity
- 12 Fatherland
- 7 Svoboda
- 6 Radical Party
- 5 Self Reliance
- 4 Our Land

Election date was 25 October 2015

== Chairmen ==
=== Regional executive committee ===
- Grigory Grishko (1939–1941)
- Filipp Reshetnyak (1944–1949)
- Andrei Mizyuk (1949–1952)
- Mark Tkachuk (1952–1956)
- Efim Yaroshchuk (1956–1972)
- Ivan Tserkovny (1972–1975)
- Boris Sventsitsky (1975–1985)
- Vladimir Fedorov (1985–1988)
- Mikhail Parasunko (1988–1991)

=== Regional council ===
- Volodymyr Blazhenchuk (1990–1992)
- Borys Klimchuk (1992–1998)
- Vasyl Dmytruk (1998–2006)
- Anatoliy Hrytsiuk (2006–2010)
- Volodymyr Voitovych (2010–2014)
- Valentyn Viter (2014–2015)
- Ihor Palytsia (2015–2019)
- Iryna Vakhovych (2019–2020)
- Hryhoriy Nedopad (since 2020)
