= Joseph Petrovykh =

Metropolitan of Russian orthodox church (1872–1937)

Metropolitan Joseph
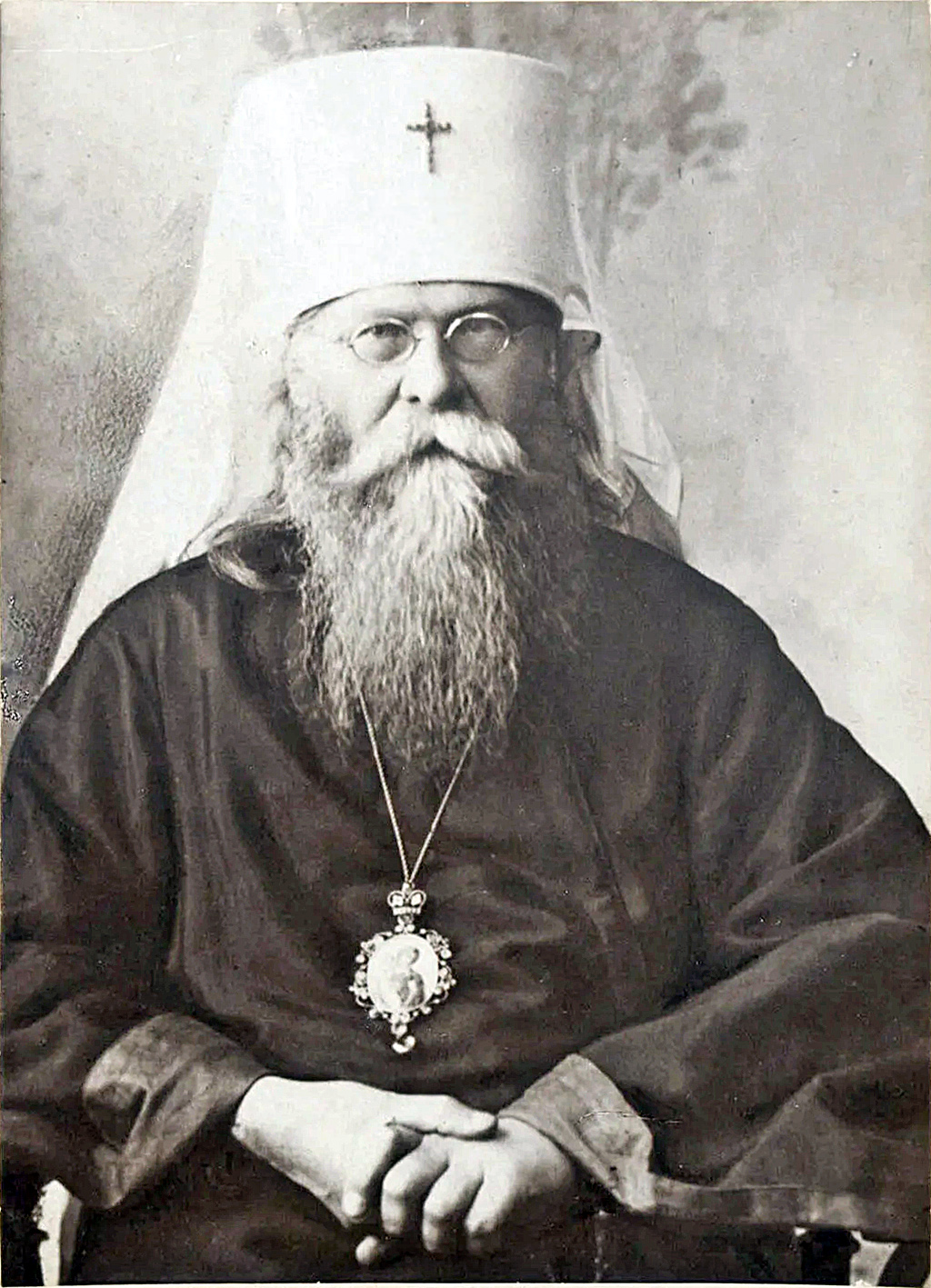
- Metropolitan Joseph in 1928
- Born: Ivan Semyonovich Petrovykh; 15 December 1872; Ustyuzhna, Novgorod Governorate, Russian Empire
- Died: 20 November 1937 (aged 64); Chimkent, Kazakh SSR, Soviet Union
- Cause of death: Summary execution by shooting

Metropolitan Joseph (Russian: Митрополит Иосиф, secular name Ivan Semyonovich Petrovykh, Russian: Иван Семёнович Петровых; 15 December 1872 – 20 November 1937) was a bishop of the Russian Orthodox Church, metropolitan of Petrograd (1926–1927). Master of Theology (1903) and spiritual writer. He refused to accept the Declaration of 1927 on full loyalty to the soviet authorities and his transfer to the Diocese of Odessa, he became the leader of Josephite movement. In 1937, he was murdered during the Great Purge.

He was glorified in the face of saints by the Russian Orthodox Church Outside of Russia as the Holy Martyr Joseph of Petrograd.

== Biography ==
=== Early life ===
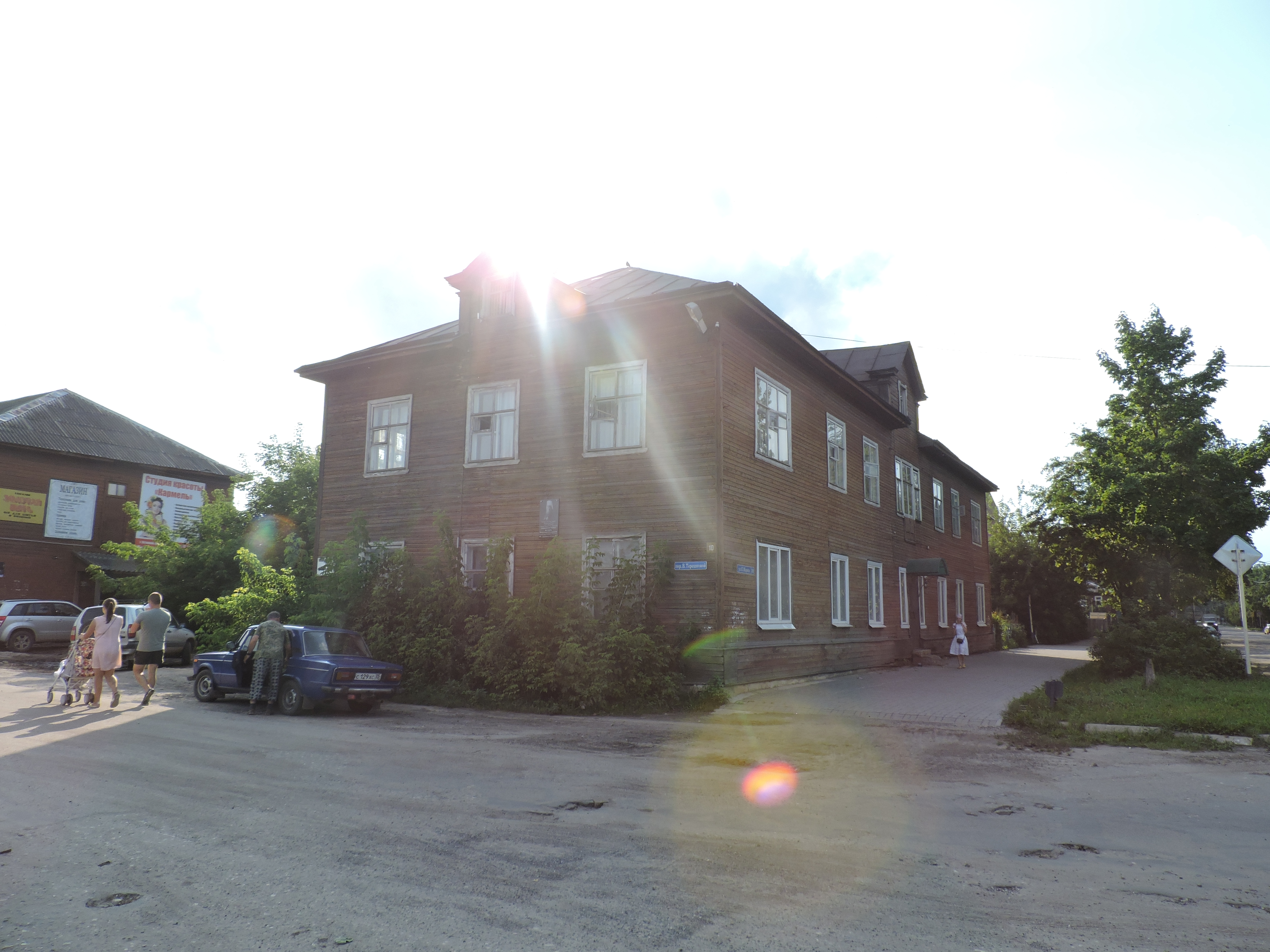
The house in Ustyuzhna, on which a commemorative plaque to the metropolitan Joseph was placed. Actually he was born and lived in a neighboring house.

He was born on December 15, 1872, in town of Ustyuzhna, Novgorod Governorate (now Vologda Oblast, Russia), in family of Semyon Kirillovich Petrovykh, who owned a bakery, and Evdokia Ivanovna, née Gankovskaya, who was involved in housework and raising children. Since there was a lot of housework, a she-cook was engaged. The Petrovykh's house was located in Kazansky Lane (now Valentina Tereshkova Lane). Ivan Petrovykh was the 4th child (in total there were 9 children in the family). His baptism took place on December 17, 2 days after his birth. Like all his brothers and sisters, in the parish church of the Ascension of the Lord on Vspolye (destroyed in 1939). The Petrovykh family was distinguished by piety. They celebrated church holidays, on the angel days they gathered at the common table.

On the recommendation of the priest of the Ascension Church, Ivan was accepted into the Ustyuzhna Theological College, which he brilliantly graduated from in 1889 and entered the Novgorod Theological Seminary, located in the Antoniev Monastery. Little is known about Ivan Petrovykh seminary years. But known, that his study was successful. Only in one subject, logic, he had a score of 4 ("very good"), in the rest subject his score was 5 ("excellent"). In 1895, Ivan Petrovykh, as the best student of the Novgorod Theological Seminary, was sent to study at the state expense to the Moscow Theological Academy (located in Sergiyev Posad, Moscow Governorate). During the holidays, Ivan worked at monasteries and churches, sorting and putting in order various church documents. In the summer, he also tried to make pilgrimages to the holy places of Russia. He successfully completed the task of the Imperial Academy of Sciences, writing down the Northern Russian people's dialect according to the developed program. On December 4, 1896, in the presence of a crowded meeting of teachers and students, Ivan Petrovykh delivered a farewell speech at the burial of the deceased Professor Andrey Smirnov, which probably became his first public speech.

He was also one of the best students at the Moscow Theological Academy; only in general church history, the history of the Russian Church and the history of philosophy did he receive marks "very good". All other marks were "excellent". The Academy Council awarded him the degree of Candidate of theology for his essay on the history of the Jewish people by Josephus Flavius. On July 11, 1899, Metropolitan Vladimir (Bogoyavlensky) of Moscow and Kolomna approved it "with granting him the right to teach at the seminary and not to hold a new oral test when seeking a master degree." In June 1899 he visited the Holy Land. Ivan recorded his impressions of visiting the places of earthly life and the exploits of Jesus Christ in the form of essays, which were later published in the journal "Soulful Reading". While studying at the academy, he began to keep a spiritual diary, in which he recorded his spiritual observations and emotions.

=== Teaching and monasticism ===
In order to continue his scientific studies after graduating from the Moscow Theological Academy, he was left with her as a professorial scholarship "to prepare for the replacement of vacant teaching chairs". In October 1899, the Council of the Moscow Theological Academy approved the program of classes for the study of the last period of Biblical history and the intention to rework his candidate thesis into master one. A year later, Ivan Petrovykh's scholarship report was highly appreciated by the rector of the Moscow Theological Academy, Bishop Arsenius (Stadnitsky) of Volokolamsk, who proposed to elect Ivan Petrovykh to the position of a teacher of Biblical history. On September 4, 1900, at the meeting of the Council of the Moscow Theological Academy, Ivan Petrovykh gave two trial lectures on the topics: "Rome and Jerusalem (on the characteristics and history of the period of Roman rule)" and "Samuel and Saul in their mutual relations". The last lecture was published in "Theological Bulletin", а journal of the Moscow Theological Academy for December 1900. After giving lectures, he was elected correcting the duties of an associate professor in the Department of Biblical History of the Moscow Theological Academy. At the same department, the rector of the Moscow Theological Academy, Bishop Arsenius, gave a course of lectures on the initial period of Biblical history from the patriarchs to the first kings, and Ivan Petrovykh gave the subsequent period.

"In the arms of the Father. Diary of a Monk". Volume 4–5. 1909

At this time, he makes the final decision about monastic tonsure, which he has been thinking about since childhood. As he wrote in his diary: "Several highly moral, noble, beautiful and immaculate girls had the desire and hope of life to share with me the happiness of marriage. I myself was almost tempted to arrange this happiness, those who expected it with me were deeply saddened by my choice of monasticism". On July 10, 1901, he wrote a petition for admission to the community of monastics, as well as a letter to Bishop Arsenius (Stadnitsky) with a similar request. On August 26, 1901, in the Gethsemane Skete at the Trinity-Sergius Lavra, Ivan was tonsured by Bishop Arsenius (Stadnitsky) into a mantle with the naming of the name Joseph in honor of the Old Testament Patriarch Joseph. On September 30, 1901, in the Trinity Cathedral of the Trinity-Sergius Lavra, Monk Joseph was ordained a hierodeacon, and on October 14, in the Intercession Church of the Moscow Theological Academy, he was ordained a hieromonk. For his zealous service in the Intercession Academic Church, a few months after his ordination, Hieromonk Joseph, at the request of the rector of the Moscow Theological Academy, Bishop Arsenius, was awarded a nabedrennik.

In April 1903, Hieromonk Joseph, who was acting the position of docent of the academy at the Department of Biblical History, submitted a petition to the Academy Council to consider his work "The History of the Jewish People on the Archaeology of Josephus. (Experience of critical analysis and processing)" as a master thesis. The dissertation was defended on June 6, 1903, in the assembly hall of the Moscow Theological Academy, the report on the master's dispute was published in the "Theological Bulletin". At the end of the debate, the Council of the Moscow Theological Academy unanimously recognized the defense as sufficient and decided to apply for the approval of the applicant in the academic degree of Master of Theology. In the same year, the dissertation was published as a separate book in the printing house of the Trinity-Sergius Lavra. It provoked responses from theologians and was generally highly appreciated. On June 19, 1903, by decree of the Most Holy Synod, Hieromonk Joseph was confirmed in the Master of Theology degree. In December of the same year, he was appointed extraordinary professor at the Department of Biblical History and inspector of the Moscow Theological Academy. On January 18, 1904, he was elevated to the rank of Archimandrite.

Since January 1905, excerpts from the diary of Archimandrite Joseph began to be published by the magazine "Soulful Reading", indicating only the initials of the author. With the blessing of Bishop Arsenius (Stadnitsky), the diary was also published in the printing house of the Trinity-Sergius Lavra, also without the full name of the author. As a specialist in Biblical topics, he later wrote several articles for the Orthodox Theological Encyclopedia, as well as detailed comments and explanatory articles in the "Explanatory Bible" on the books "Judith", "Esther" and the "Books of Maccabees".

In 1905, after Bloody Sunday, he stopped commemorating the imperial family at divine services and was temporarily banned from serving. On January 3, 1906, he filed a petition for a month's leave for this time, the certificate of the Lavra's doctor was attached to the petition, which indicated that Archimandrite Joseph "needs a temporary termination of his official duties and full rest to restore the nervous system that has been very tired lately".

=== Abbot of the Jabłeczna and Yuriev monasteries ===
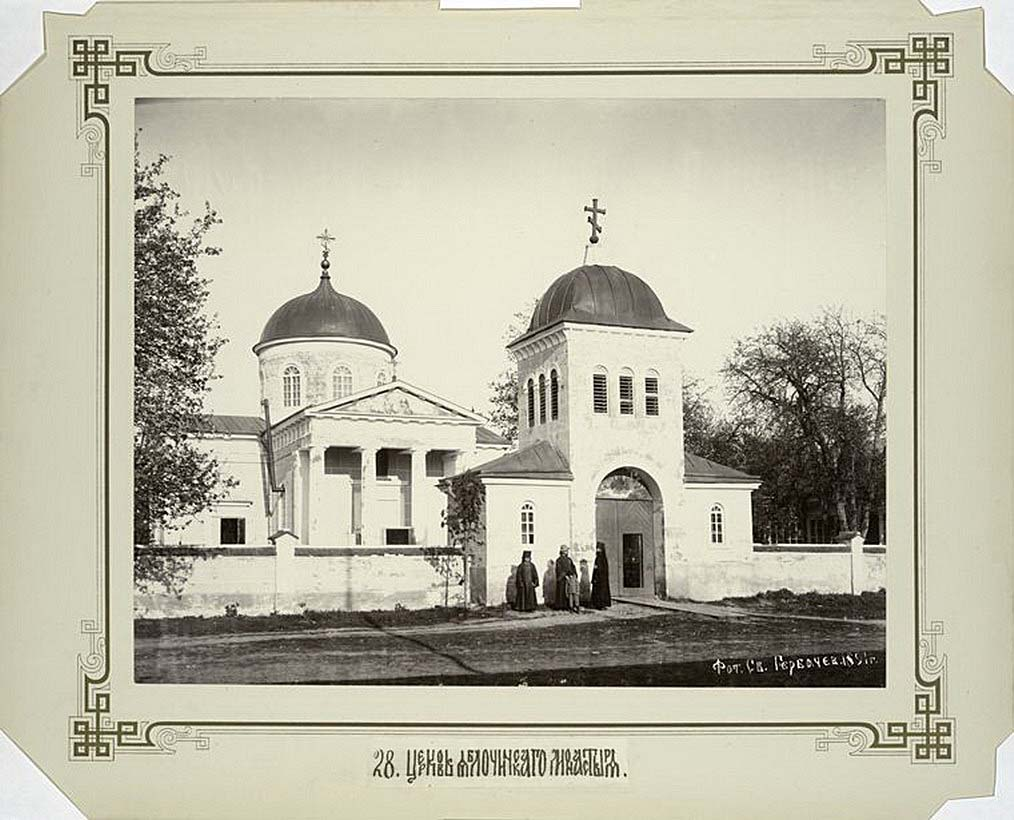
St. Onuphrius Monastery in Jabłeczna

The "Provisional Rules" issued by the Most Holy Synod on February 21, 1906, as an addition to the Statute, gave broad autonomy to the Moscow Theological Academy, but they were not accepted by Archimandrite Joseph, because, in his opinion, they created an impossible situation for monastics in the theological school. At this time, Archimandrite Joseph decided to leave the academy. Bishop Eulogius (Georgievsky) of Chełm informed the Most Holy Synod of the need, in view of the extreme intensification of Catholic propaganda, to organize an Eastern Orthodox missionary center in the only male St. Onuphrius Monastery in Jabłeczna in the diocese with an urgent request to put a theologically educated pastor at the head of the monastery for this purpose. As such, Bishop Eulogius petitioned for the appointment of Archimandrite Joseph, in accordance with desire expressed by Archimandrite Joseph to devote himself to missionary activity. By the decree of the Most Holy Synod of June 30, 1906, Archimandrite Joseph was appointed rector of the St. Onuphrius Monastery in Jabłeczna, Siedlce Governorate at Kingdom of Poland, with his dismissal from the educational service.

At the beginning of August of the same year, Archimandrite Joseph arrived at his new destination. It was a far western outskirts of the Russian Empire, where a small Eastern Orthodox population was surrounded by hostile Catholics and constantly experienced strong pressure and harassment from them. Archimandrite Joseph found the monastery in a pitiful state: "Unexpectedly, I was forced to condemn myself to live in a poor, upset, neglected, provincial, deserted monastery. After the splendor of the Lavra — oh, what a severe deprivation, ordeal, chagrin!". Most of all, Archimandrite Joseph was struck by the carelessness and slovenliness in relation to the worships and to the church. In letters to friends and admirers in Sergiyev Posad, he asked for the most necessary things, answering their questions about the needs of the monastery: simple vestments for everyday service, which were not found for him in the monastery; about circles for a chalice to cover from flies; about tissues to cover the throne and the altar, in the monastery they were covered with white sheets (always dirty), and for vessels that were not covered there at all and always stood in dust and dirt. He asked his benefactors for a new rug laid from the throne to the ambon, because "the old one was covered in holes and stains from the nice habit of the local brethren to spit! It's unpleasant even to look at. And there is absolutely nothing to replace it with. It's terrible, and on great holidays you will have to admire this outrage." He also complained about the unpainted wooden floors, with many holes, from which whole herds of mice ran out, their tracks covered the altar and even the altar, all the coverings on which were soaked to the point of nausea with a disgusting mouse smell. Archimandrite Joseph was distressed by the lack of education and the lack of church manners of the local population.

Archimandrite Joseph undertook to put the monastery in order. He composed a worship and an akathist to the heavenly patron of the monastery, St. Onuphrius; he arranged a reliquary for his relics; ordered icons of St. Seraphim and St. Sergius for the monastery, which were met with a procession at the station and solemnly transferred to the monastery, attracting many worshippers. During the transfer of the icon of St. Sergius in December 1906, so many people gathered that the small church of the monastery could barely accommodate all the worshippers. Soon Archimandrite Joseph began the repair and reconstruction of the church in the Jabłeczna monastery and already in the spring of 1907 noted in a letter that "everything was done as well as possible — good, spacious, bright, I would not wish for better, only if it would be closer to Russia." The consecration of the church was carried out after major repairs on December 16, 1907, without Archimandrite Joseph.

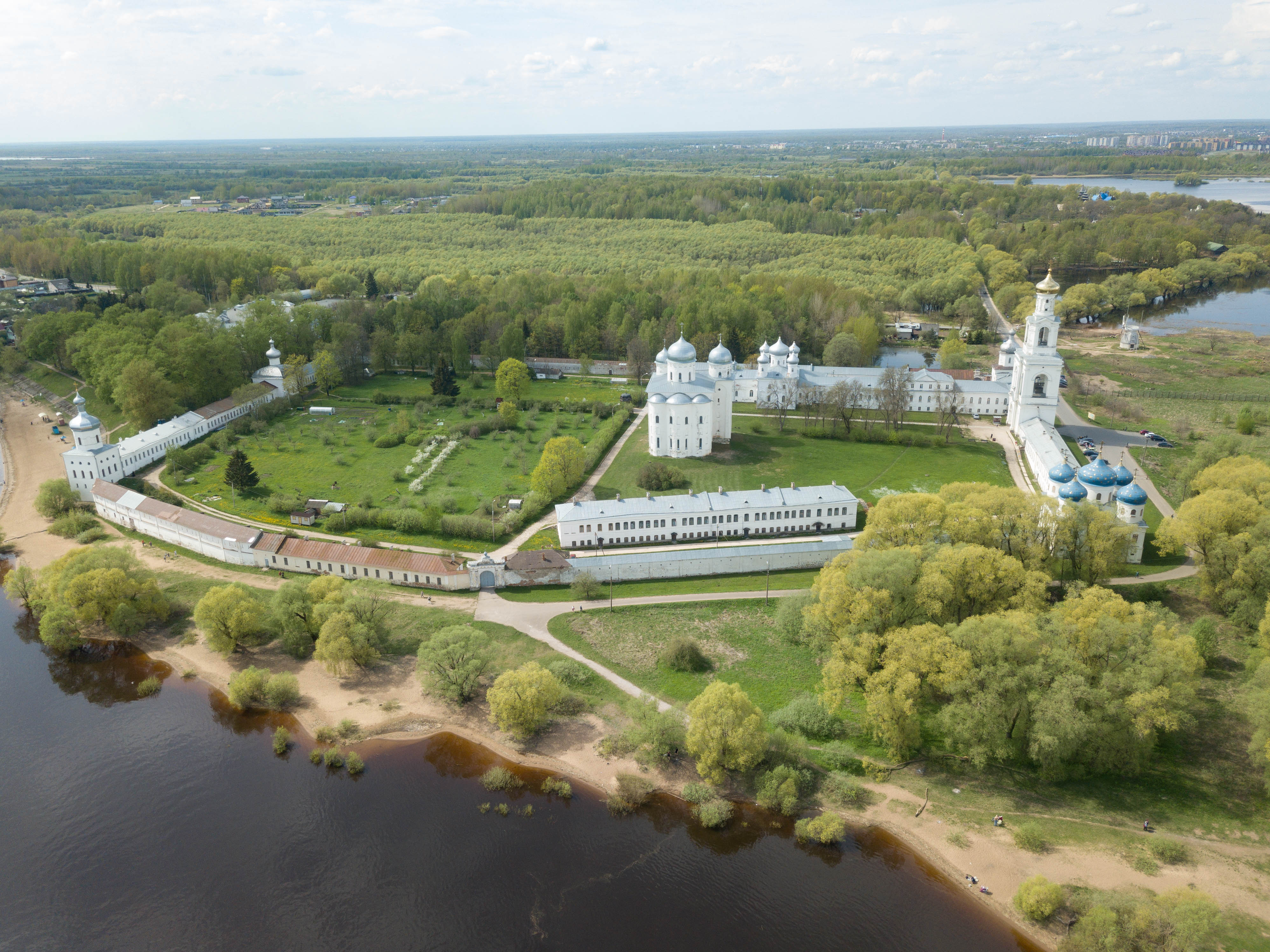
Yuriev Monastery

In September 1907, he was appointed rector of the Yuriev Monastery, located three versts from Novgorod, on the left bank of the Volkhov River. In terms of the number and splendor of the churches, it was second only to the Kiev-Pechersk Lavra and the Trinity-Sergius Lavra. After the poor Jabłeczna monastery in the far western outskirts, the transfer to one of the richest monasteries in Russia, and even in his native Novgorod area, was supposed to bring Archimandrite Joseph joy. Later, when he became the abbot of a monastery in Rostov, he wrote that serving in Novogorod was "invaluable and irreplaceable for the soul." Archimandrite Joseph sometimes served in the St. Sophia Cathedral, took part in religious and moral readings, which were held on Sundays in the hall of the Novgorod male gymnasium and other public buildings. Information about the Novgorod ministry of Archimandrite Joseph is rather scarce. It is known that he was the victim of slander, as he wrote in his diary: "The enemy took terrible revenge on me for something, probably extremely unpleasant to him. He slandered, blackened my name with a malicious attack on me by others. The slander found a response in the highest spheres. It came to a request about my morality." His successor as rector of the Yuriev Monastery, Archimandrite Anatoly (Yunger), filed a complaint against him to the Synod, accusing him of embezzlement of monastic capital. Obviously, Archimandrite Anatoly's complaint was not given a move. Soon Archimandrite Anatoly was removed from the position of abbot.

=== Bishop of Uglich ===
On February 27, 1909, by decree of the Holy Synod, the rector of the Yuriev Monastery, Archimandrite Joseph was appointed Bishop of Uglich, the second vicar of the Diocese of Yaroslavl with his elevation to the rank of bishop. At the same time, he was appointed rector of the Spaso-Yakovlevsky Monastery in Rostov with a residence at the monastery. On March 14, 1909, in the meeting room of the Holy Synod the nomination of Archimandrite Joseph to the episcopal dignity took place. On March 15, 1909, his episcopal consecration took place in the Holy Trinity Cathedral of the Alexander Nevsky Lavra. Metropolitan Anthony (Vadkovsky) of St. Petersburg led the divine service, he also handed the bishop's baton to the ordained bishop and delivered an edifying speech. On March 20, 1910, bishop Joseph was renamed the first vicar of the diocese.

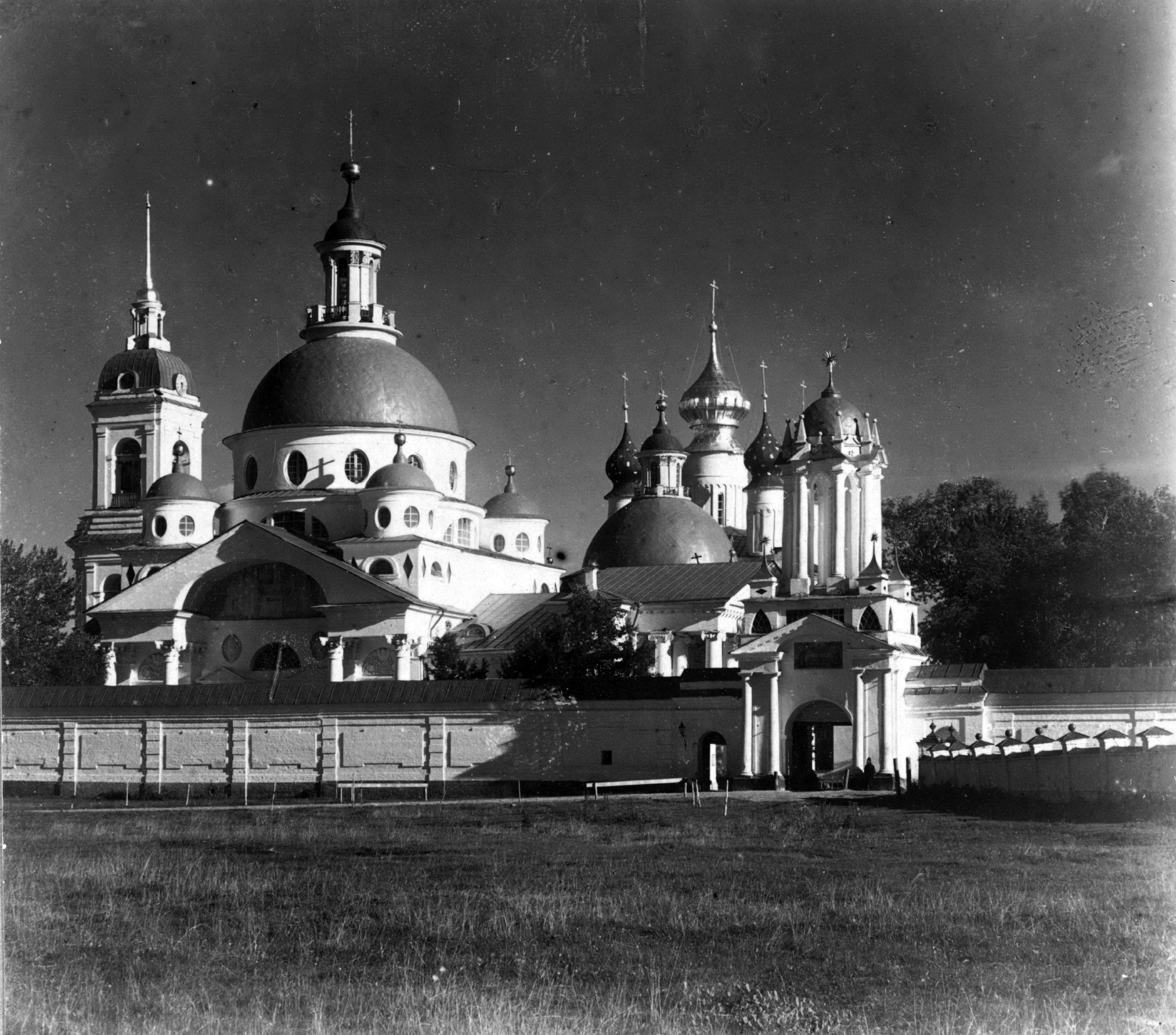
Spaso—Yakovlevsky Monastery in 1911

The first thing that the new rector had to start his activity with was a letter of protest against the planned construction of a sago plant on a plot of land closely adjacent to the Church of Michael the Archangel and only separated by a road from the eastern wall of the Spaso—Yakovlevsky Monastery. The letter had an effect, and the plant was not built. He prepared and conducted celebrations dedicated to the 200th anniversary of the repose of St. Demetrius of Rostov, held on October 26–28, 1909 at the Spaso-Yakovlevsky Monastery with a large gathering of clergy and laity. In the future, he carefully collected and stored everything connected with the memory of St. Demetrius. From the first days of his abbacy, Bishop Joseph immediately took up the improvement of the monastery. In the very first year of his abbacy, Bishop Joseph consecrated the church in honor of the Our Lady of Tolga and carried out the restoration of the Conception Cathedral. He also began the construction of the cave church of the Resurrection, and less than three years later, on Easter of 1912, the church was already consecrated. In 1913, a 155-pound bell was raised to the monastery bell tower, bought by Bishop Joseph in the Boris and Gleb Monastery. In 1916, Bishop Joseph consecrated the chapel in honor of the Our Lady of Vatopedi, in 1917 - the church in honor of the icon of the Mother of God "Joy of All who Mourn" at the hotel of the monastery.

Bishop Joseph also studied shrines and antiquities of Rostov with great interest, finding time even to write art criticism articles. As a connoisseur of church singing, he managed to gather in the Spaso-Yakovlevsky Monastery wonderful choirs that were famous in Rostov, including the children's choir organized at the monastery. He loved ancient chants and mourned the widespread distortion and even the complete loss of them. The desire to thoroughly familiarize himself with ancient church chants became one of the main goals of Bishop Joseph's pilgrimage to Mount Athos and then to the New Athos Monastery in Abkhazia in the summer of 1911, when he received a month leave. He paid serious attention to the "Society of Khorugv Bearers" in Rostov, whose members, in addition to directly wearing banners and church shrines, as well as maintaining order during worship, took care of the splendor of churches and helping the poor and sick.

Despite the fact that Bishop Joseph was a vicar bishop, he had a lot of time occupied with administrative everyday episcopal work. This is also an overview of the churches of the diocese with their annual detour, as evidenced by the annual reports with an accurate indication of all villages and distances between them, as well as the total number of versts covered on the way, stored in the archives of the monastery. And extensive business and administrative correspondence; and answers to numerous petitions and requests on various issues. From June 18 to August 1, 1912, Bishop Joseph ruled the Diocese of Yaroslavl after Archbishop Tikhon (Bellavin) left for the Caucasus for treatment. On May 22, 1913, he received Emperor Nicholas II, who arrived to Rostov with his family and entourage in connection with the celebration of the 300th anniversary of the House of Romanov. On December 16, 1913, Grand Duchess Elizabeth Feodorovna visited the Spaso-Yakovlevsky Monastery incognito. In December 1913, by decree of the Most Holy Synod, Archbishop Agathangel (Preobrazhensky) of Vilna and Lithuania was appointed to the Yaroslavl see, while Archbishop Tikhon (Bellavin) was transferred to the Vilna see. On January 12, 1914, Archbishop Tikhon was seen off in Rostov. In the last word, Archbishop Tikhon also mentioned Bishop Joseph: "The pious citizens of Rostov petitioned for the establishment of a vicariate in the town of Rostov. To the best of his ability, Vladyka Tikhon contributed to this. Now the Rostovites have a enlightener, His Grace Joseph, who is zealous for faith and piety."

On February 5, 1914, a new archbishop arrived in Yaroslavl. Bishop Joseph was among the clergy who welcomed the new archpastor. On May 1, 1914, Archbishop Agathangel visited Rostov. In the future, Archbishop Agathangel repeatedly came to Rostov and concelebrated with Bishop Joseph. From August 25 to September 16, 1914, Bishop Joseph was entrusted with temporary administration of the Diocese of Kostroma, since at that time the ruling and vicar bishops simultaneously left Kostroma. On August 29, 1914, Bishop Joseph served a memorial service in the Kostroma Cathedral "for the leaders and soldiers who laid their bellies on the battlefield." A procession was made from the cathedral to the central Susanin Square, where a prayer service was held at the St. Alexander Chapel in the concelebration of the entire city clergy "for the granting of victory to the Russian Army over the enemy, and to the people over drunkenness." On September 3, 1914, he ordered "to declare to all the deans, abbots and abbesses of monasteries and parish priests to provide possible assistance by collecting for the needs of the Red Cross for the entire duration of the war." Upon his return to Rostov, Bishop Joseph completed the construction of a two-story stone House named after John of Kronstadt, built according to the latest technical requirements. The building houses a hospital, a shelter for the poor and wanderers, and an elementary school for poor children. On October 28, 1914, on the day of the memory of Demetrius of Rostov, a solemn consecration was performed. The hospital immediately began its work. Two years later, his excellent condition was noted by the Grand Duke Nicholas Mikhailovich of Russia, who visited Rostov.

It is unknown how Bishop Joseph met the February Revolution of 1917. On May 31, 1917, together with Bishop Andrew (Ukhtomsky) of Ufa and edinoverie Archpriest Simeon Shleyov, Bishop Joseph visited the Old Believers' council of the Belokrinitskaya hierarchy in Moscow. Bishops Andrew and Joseph appealed to the Old Believers with a proposal to discuss the possibility of reconciliation and unification, and, in their opinion, "unification in no case can and should not be mechanical, external. It should be full, heartfelt, so that each side contributes its talent to the common treasury of church life and multiplies it." The undertaking was not crowned with success: the Old Believer bishops, who at first kindly received Bishops Andrew and Joseph, but then responded with a rather harsh message. In the same year Bishop Joseph was elected a member of the All-Russian Local Council of 1917-1918, but did not participate the sessions.

On December 1, 1917, in connection with the transfer of Archbishop John (Smirnov) of Riga to the Ryazan see, Bishop Joseph was appointed temporary administrator of the Diocese of Riga. Due to the occupation of Riga by German troops, the diocesan administration was located in Yuryev (now Tartu, Estonia). On January 30 (February 12), 1918, he was released from the temporary administration of the Diocese of Riga due to the appointment of Bishop Platon (Kulbusch) of Reval as the temporary administrator of the diocese.

On the basis of the Decree on Museum Property of October 10, 1918, the Spaso-Yakovlevsky Monastery as a monument of ancient art was transferred to the museum Department of the People's Commissariat for Education. In April 1919, an "agreement" was signed between the Rostov District Council of Workers' and Soldiers' Deputies and the abbot of the monastery, Bishop Joseph; the namestnik, Archimandrite Tikhon (Shigin); the treasurer, hieromonk Demetrius, and other monks on the transfer "for indefinite" use of the monastery with churches to the monastery brethren. At the same time, normal monastic life turned out to be impossible due to the settlement of entire families in monastic premises by orders, and the monastery itself turned into a "noisy bazaar". The food of the brethren was the most meager; in winter they experienced unbearable cold, they had to cut down many trees in the monastery fence to heat the cells. In February 1919, Metropolitan Agathangel (Preobrazhensky), who had returned to his diocese, settled in this monastery.

=== Archbishop of Rostov ===
On January 22, 1920, he was appointed Archbishop of Rostov, vicar of the Diocese of the Yaroslavl. In Rostov on April 25, 1920, the tenth Congress of city and county Councils decided to open the holy relics in the churches of Rostov Uyezd. After the opening on April 26 of the same year of the relics of the Rostov Wonderworkers in the Assumption Cathedral, the Spaso-Yakovlevsky Dimitrievsky and Avraamiev monasteries, Archbishop Joseph organized and led a procession as a protest. The Yaroslavl Extraordinary Commission initiated an investigation into the fact of resistance to the opening of the relics, and Archbishop Joseph was in the case as one of the main defendants. In his testimony during interrogations, archbishop Joseph stressed that he had no "counter-revolutionary intentions", that he had not conducted any agitation and did not admit himself guilty of anything. On July 7, 1920, an arrest warrant was signed for Archbishop Joseph, and the next day he was arrested and imprisoned. At that time, hundreds of signatures of believers in his defense were collected in Rostov and surrounding villages; citizens' statements about the release of Archbishop Joseph were attached to the materials of the investigative case. The investigator proposed to sentence Archbishop Joseph and two other defendants to capital punishment. On July 18, Archbishop Joseph was transported to Moscow and imprisoned in the internal prison of the Cheka. Here he was charged with "campaigning and resisting the execution of the government's order to open the holy relics of the Rostov miracle workers." On July 26, 1920, by the decree of the Presidium of the Cheka, "Petrovykh I. S. was sentenced to imprisonment in a concentration camp for 1 year on probation with a warning of not doing of agitation." After his release from prison, Archbishop Joseph returned to the Spaso-Yakovlevsky Monastery.

In March — April 1922, the Rostov Uyezd Commission for the seizure of church valuables compiled an inventory of items made of precious metals and precious stones belonging to the Spaso-Yakovlevsky Monastery; then chalices, salaries, holy water bowls, silver reliquaries of the saints were seized. On May 28, 1922, the same commission adopted a resolution on bringing to justice the clergy of the Spaso-Yakovlevsky Monastery, and above all Archbishop Joseph, "for hiding valuables," as noted in the minutes of the commission meeting: "Due to the fact that there was a significant number of valuables that did not appear in the new inventory, which is confirmed by the fact that the executive troika discovered 2 mitres, gold and silver ones, that did not appear in the inventory, with precious stones". Archbishop Joseph immediately did not recognize the Renovationist High Church Administration created in May 1922. Later, during one of the interrogations in 1932, he testified that in 1922 he was accused of agitating against the seizure of valuables "because of the slander of the Renovationists," for whom he was one of the main enemies in the diocese. On November 19, 1922, Archbishop Joseph "for resisting the seizure of church valuables" was sentenced by the Yaroslavl Revolutionary Tribunal to four years in prison.

By the order of the chairman of the All-Russian Central Executive Committee Mikhail Kalinin on January 5, 1923, he was released ahead of schedule. As he wrote later: "To have mercy is to have mercy entirely and completely, as the All-Union starosta M. I. Kalinin once pardoned me - that's what I understand and I am infinitely grateful to him for it." After his release, he stayed at the Alekseevsky Monastery in Uglich. In connection with the arrest of Metropolitan Agathangel (Preobrazhensky) of Yaroslavl, he became the temporary administrator of the diocese, managed the diocese until the release of Metropolitan Agathangel in April 1926. Categorically rejected any dialogue with the Renovationists. He made a decisive contribution to overcoming the Renovationist schism in the Diocese of Yaroslavl. In a letter from the head of the Yaroslavl Department of the GPU dated August 8, 1923, he said: "The Renovationist group has now almost completely ceased its activities under the onslaught of the "Tikhonite" group. The majority of the clergy and believers follow the path of "Tikhonism", weakening the morally and financially renovationist group. Bishop Joseph of Rostov is at the head of the Tikhonite group. This person in the Yaroslavl province is currently very authoritative not only among the clergy and believers, but also among the Soviet workers of the grassroots apparatus, and especially the Rostov uyezd. <...> In order to maintain the activity of the renovationist group, it is certainly necessary to remove Bishop Joseph from the borders of the Yaroslavl province, which will significantly weaken the Tikhonite group, and thereby give the opportunity to revive the renovationist group." These persistent petitions went unanswered. And for more than three years Archbishop Joseph remained in Rostov, uniting all Orthodox dioceses loyal to the Patriarch Tikhon and Metropolitan Agathangel, who was exiled to Siberia. Moreover, in 1925 and 1926, Archbishop Joseph led processions with the Our Lady of Vatoped in the volosts of the Rostov Uyezd, receiving permission for them from local authorities. The residents of Rostov have kept a good memory of Archbishop Joseph for a long time. Together with the memory of him, they carefully kept, as family heirlooms, photos of him, icons, books and other things presented to them.

March 18, 1924 (by old style) Patriarch Tikhon engaged Archbishop Joseph to work in the temporary Holy Synod. On May 8 of the same year, when at the meeting of the Holy Synod, on the proposal of the Patriarch, a resolution was adopted on the formation of the highest bodies of church administration, the name of Archbishop Joseph is also included in the list of members of the Holy Synod. However, this work did not last long. A little over a month later, the Patriarch was forced to announce the termination of the work of the Holy Synod due to the lack of registration by the civil authorities of both the Synod itself and the bishops who were part of it. From the end of 1924 until August 1926, Archbishop Joseph temporarily managed the Diocese of Novgorod. There is no detailed information about his ministry there. Obviously, Archbishop Joseph often visited and served in Novgorod and tried to counteract the Renovationists there as well. His letter to Archpriest Alexander Sovetov, rector of St. Sophia Cathedral, dates back to that time. Archbishop Joseph collected money for the repair of the cathedral and promised to bring a certain amount by Easter to start work. He asked Archpriest Alexander to tell him the exact figure for heating repairs and was sure that he would be able to find it, and thus carry out repairs and keep the cathedral for himself, successfully defending it from the renovationists encroaching on it. He was aware of things in Leningrad, as he was passing through there and sometimes took part in worships. A large number of believers gathered his episcopal services at the Nativity of the Theotokos Cathedral in Rostov.

On April 7, 1925, Patriarch Tikhon died. Archbishop Joseph participated in the meeting of bishops on April 12, 1925, which confirmed Metropolitan Peter (Polyansky) of Krutitsy as Locum Tenens of the Patriarchal Throne. On December 6, 1925, anticipating the arrest, Metropolitan Peter in his testamentary order named Archbishop Joseph as the third candidate for the place of Deputy Patriarchal Locum Tenens, after Metropolitans Sergius (Stragorodsky) of Nizhny Novgorod and Metropolitan Michael (Yermakov) of Grogno. On December 9, 1925, Metropolitan Peter was arrested, and Metropolitan Sergius (Stragorodsky), who was in Nizhny Novgorod, assumed the rights of a deputy. Archbishop Joseph at that time supported Metropolitan Sergius, who assumed the rights of Deputy Locum Tenens after the arrest of Metropolitan Peter, when Metropolitan Agathangel (Preobrazhensky) of Yaroslavl, named by the will of Patriarch Tikhon as the second candidate for the post of Locum Tenens of the Patriarchal Throne, was released from arrest and issued a message on April 18, 1926, on the assumption of the rights of Patriarchal Locum Tenens. As a result, Metropolitan Agathangel decides to abandon his claims to the position of patriarchal deputy. On June 8, Metropolitan Agafangel brings this to the attention of the authorities, informs Metropolitan Peter about it on June 12, and telegraphs Metropolitan Sergius on June 17: "I, due to extremely upset health, have already refused to fill the post of Patriarchal Locum Tenens".

=== Metropolitan of Leningrad ===
On August 26, 1926, by order of the Deputy Patriarchal Locum Tenens, Metropolitan Sergius (Stragorodsky), Archbishop Joseph was transferred to the Leningrad see and elevated to the rank of Metropolitan of Leningrad with the laying of a white hood with a diamond cross and a cross on the mitre. His appointment to the Leningrad (Petrograd) see was interceded by the clergy of Leningrad, who pinned great hopes on him in restoring order and peace in the Diocese of Leningrad, by that time it was already split between supporters of a conciliatory and irreconcilable line in relation to the Soviet government. Archbishop Alexy (Simansky) of Tikhvin arrived to Novgorod, where metropolitan Joseph stayed at that time, and informed him about this appointment. JOseph accepted the appointment "out of obedience", but objected to the title "of Leningrad", calling himself "metropolitan of Petrograd". At divine services, he was also commemorated as "of Petrograd" (official name of the city during 1914–1924).

In Leningrad, the news of the appointment of a well-known fighter for the faith, a man of ascetic life and a learned bishop to the chair, widowed since 1922, after the execution of Metropolitan Benjamin (Kazansky) of Petrograd, was received with joy. On September 11, metropolitan Joseph arrived to Leningrad. Metropolitan Joseph was warmly welcomed by the flock and clergy as a worthy successor of Metropolitan Benjamin. As Mikhail Cheltsov wrote, "His appointment was met with great, even enthusiastic joy. Well, I thought, at last we are with a real hierarch again, at last the episcopal discord and the races for primacy will stop, at last, little by little, order will come in our affairs and relationships. So we thought and naively thought, we forgot our terrible enemy: the Soviet government, which could not leave us even with little well-being, and we, with our naivety, allowed the most grandiose tactlessness. This tactlessness consisted in arranging a grandiose celebration on Alexander Nevsky Day, August 30 [September 12 by new calendar]." In the evening of that day (the eve of the memory of St. Alexander Nevsky) and in the morning of the feast day, he performed a solemn divine service in the Trinity Cathedral of the Alexander Nevsky Lavra. 150 clergymen and 8 bishops attended the celebration. During his stay in Leningrad, Metropolitan Joseph met with his younger brothers: Nikolay and Pyotr. The meeting took place at the apartment of Nikolay, and the Metropolitan Joseph was accompanied by one of his servants. According to the testimony of Metropolitan Joseph's relatives, he was in a hurry to leave for Rostov the Great, hoping to receive the brothers on his return.

The religious upsurge associated with the appointment of Metropolitan Joseph and his great popularity in Leningrad caused concern to the Joint State Political Directorate. On the evening of September 13, Metropolitan Joseph left Leningrad for Novgorod to collect his belongings, and from there he was summoned to Moscow, where he had a conversation with Yevgeny Tuchkov, who oversees church affairs at the Joint State Political Directorate. The authorities decided not to allow Metropolitan Joseph to return to Leningrad, and he was exiled to Rostov, he was forbidden to leave the town. Metropolitan Joseph appointed Bishop Gabriel (Voyevodin), who had not served before and lived as a private person with his relatives, as the interim administrator of the diocese. Meanwhile, relations between the "conciliatory" or "liberal" clergy headed by Archpriest Nikolai Chukov and the "right" were increasingly strained in the diocese. The "conciliatory" clergy tried to return Archbishop Alexy (Simansky), appointed to Novgorod, to the Petrograd diocese, the "rights" actively opposed this.

On December 6, 1926, after the arrest of Metropolitan Sergius in November of the same year, Metropolitan Joseph, in accordance with the testamentary order of Metropolitan Peter (Polyansky), assumed the rights of Deputy Patriarchal Locum Tenens. Being under threat of arrest, Metropolitan Joseph, a day after taking over the administration, on December 8, 1926, issued a testamentary decree-a message on the succession of the supreme church authority, naming 3 successors in case he could not fulfill his powers: Archbishops Cornelius (Sobolev) of Sverdlovsk, Thaddeus (Uspensky) of Astrakhan and Seraphim (Samoilovich) of Uglich. In addition, Metropolitan Joseph indicated the names of hierarchs who, in the event of the death of Metropolitan Peter (Polyansky) or "the sufficiently clarified hopelessness of his return to the administration of church affairs" could become locum tenens. These are Metropolitan Kirill (Smirnov) and Metropolitan Agathangel (Preobrazhensky) named in Patriarch Tikhon's will, as well as Metropolitan Arsenius (Stadnitsky) and Metropolitan Sergius (Stragorodsky) named in Metropolitan Peter's will.

A day after the publication of the testamentary decree, Metropolitan Joseph was arrested. The arrest was connected with the secret election of the patriarch, initiated in autumn 1926 by bishop Paulinus (Kroshechkin) and archbishop Cornelius (Sobolev). In the conditions of the impossibility of convening a local council, they decided to hold the election of the patriarch by secret questioning and collecting signatures of bishops. The majority of the interviewed bishops supported the candidacy of Metropolitan Kirill (Smirnov) of Kazan. Metropolitan Joseph was interrogated on December 10, 1926. On December 16, Metropolitan Joseph was summoned by the Joint State Political Directorate to Moscow and on December 29 was taken to the place of exile in the closed Nikolo-Modensky Monastery, located 35 km from Ustyuzhna. Archbishop Seraphim (Samoilovich) of Uglich assumed the rights of Deputy Patriarchal Locum Tenens.

On March 30, 1927, Metropolitan Sergius (Stragorodsky) returned the duties of Deputy Patriarchal Locum Tenens. On May 18 of the same year, he convokes a Temporary Patriarchal Holy Synod as an advisory body to himself. On May 20, permission was received from the NKVD for the activities of the Synod, but only temporary. On May 25, a Synod meeting was held, and on the same day a circular was sent to the dioceses, in which the bishops were recommended to organize diocesan councils and register them with local authorities. At the same time, the bishops were allowed to invite the persons they needed to the diocesan councils themselves. In the Diocese of Leningrad, an application to the Administrative Department was submitted by Bishop Nicholas (Yarushevich), who in the spring of 1927, after the arrest of Bishop Gabriel, temporarily managed the diocese. Bishop Nicholas submitted an application to the Administrative Department of the Joint State Political Directorate with a request to register: 1) Diocesan administration consisting of: himself as the administrator of the diocese, vicar bishops Seraphim (Protopopov) and Demetrius (Lyubimov); 2) a provisional Council consisting of six archpriests: Vasily Veryuzhsky, Nikolai Chukov, Nikolai Vinogradov, Sergiy Bogolyubov, Mikhail Cheltsov and Vasily Yablonsky with Secretary Alexey Zapadalov. By including clergy from both groups in the Diocesan Council, Bishop Nicholas apparently hoped to eliminate differences and divisions in the diocese. However, the authorities were in no hurry to register the Diocesan administration. As the Leningrad security officers informed Yevgeny Tuchkov, the registration was deliberately delayed "in order to identify the enemy," they were assigned the candidacies of Veryuzhsky, Bogolyubov and Zapadalov as "terry Tikhonites" and "supporters of Metropolitan Joseph."

On July 29 of the same year, Metropolitan Sergius (Stragorodsky) together with the Temporary Patriarchal Holy Synod, issued the "Declaration" on relationship to Soviet power. It was sent to all dioceses and parishes and then published on August 19, 1927, in Izvestia. As Archpriest Mikhail Cheltsov, one of leader of irreconcilable part of Leningrad clergy, wrote: "The message that came out struck the vast majority of believers. There was nothing to object to his three main thoughts — about the need to legalize church administration, about the naturalness for our clergy abroad to abandon harsh speeches against the Soviet government and about the desirability of convening a Local All—Russian Council - it was all accepted by almost everyone. But the tone of the message is somehow obsequious and non—ecclesiastical, its many words and even whole expressions did not so much cut the ear as outraged the mind and feelings. It was seen that the ecclesiastical power had again bound itself to the secular government, subordinated itself to it, losing its freedom. And for what? So far, only for the establishment and legalization of the mitr<opolitan> Sergius and the Synod that consists with him. But what kind of Synod is this? The names of its members did not foretell anything good to any of us: all these are the names of vicars or unknown bishops. And finding among them the name of Alexy, our former vicar, and now Archbishop of Khutyn, set up the vast majority of us against the Synod...". In mid-August, the vicar of the Diocese of Leningrad, Bishop Demetrius (Lyubimov) of Gdov, and a group of Leningrad clerics addressed Metropolitan Joseph with a message in which they expressed their disagreement with the course of Metropolitan Sergius' church policy. Such an appeal found a compassion from Metropolitan Joseph. In September of the same year, with the consent of the authorities, he moved from the Nikolo-Modensky Monastery to Rostov, where he still served in the Saviour-Yakovlevsky Monastery. There was no response to Metropolitan Joseph's request to Evgeny Tuchkov to allow him to leave for Leningrad.

=== Opposition to Metropolitan Sergius ===
On September 13, 1927, at a meeting of the Provisional Patriarchal Holy Synod chaired by Metropolitan Sergius, "for reasons of greater benefit to the church," it was decided to transfer Metropolitan Joseph to the Diocese of Odessa (the official decree was dated September 17). Metropolitan Joseph was summoned to Moscow, where he was informed of the new appointment. Having learned, according to him, that "the relocation was caused by the intrigues of individuals," he declared its illegality, referring to the definition of the Local Council of 1917-1918 "On Diocesan administration," and demanded that his case be referred to the court of bishops. Returning to Rostov, Joseph wrote a letter to Metropolitan Sergius on September 28, in which he again called the decision on his transfer "illegal and in no way acceptable," pointing out its cause as "the evil intrigue of a bunch of people who did not want him to stay in Leningrad." In the letter, Metropolitan Joseph accused Metropolitan Sergius of "lamentably slavish obedience, completely alien to the church principle" and again refused to obey the decree of the Deputy Locum Tenens as non-canonical, "adopted under the influence of extraneous factors and for this reason adversely affecting the church organization".

Later, Metropolitan Joseph announced his refusal to comply with the decision to transfer to the Diosede of Odessa to Bishop Demetrius (Lyubimov), who visited him in Rostov, who brought this news to Leningrad. On October 3, Bishop Nicholas (Yarushevich) of Peterhof, who temporarily ruled the Diocese of Leningrad, reported to the Synod about the discontent in the city in connection with the transfer of Metropolitan Joseph from Leningrad. On October 12, however, the Synod approved the decision to transfer Joseph to the Diocese of Odessa. The vicars of the Leningrad diocese were ordered to stop commemorate the name of Metropolitan Joseph at the divine service and submit to Bishop Nicholas. On October 22, the text of an extract from the Synod's decree on the new appointment was received by Metropolitan Joseph in Rostov. On October 25, Metropolitan Joseph's transfer to Odessa was officially announced in the churches of the Leningrad diocese. On October 30, Metropolitan Joseph sent a new message to the Synod with a refusal to leave the Leningrad department, stating that he "does not want to obey the church authorities," which, according to him, is in a "servile state".

During the negotiations conducted on 12–14 December 1927 in Moscow with Metropolitan Sergius by a delegation of Leningrad clergy and laity, Metropolitan Joseph met with Bishop Demetrius (Lyubimov) and got acquainted with the delegation's requirements for changing church policy and approved it. On December 26 of the same year, after unsuccessful negotiations with the Deputy Patriarchal Locum Tenens of the Leningrad supporters of Metropolitan Joseph, the vicar bishops Demetrius (Lyubimov) of Gdov and Sergius (Druzhinin) of Koporye signed an Act of departure from Metropolitan Sergius and termination of Canonical Communion with him. This decision received the preliminary approval of Metropolitan Joseph. In the second half of December, he wrote to Bishop Demetrius: "I approve of your step, I join you, but, of course, I am deprived of the opportunity to help you more significantly." After the Synod banned Bishops Demetrius and Sergius from the service, Metropolitan Joseph, in a letter dated January 7, 1928, again approved the departure of his vicars from Metropolitan Sergius and urged them to ignore the orders of the highest church authority.

On February 2, 1928, the archbishops Sylvester (Bratanovsky) of Vologda and Anatoly (Grisyuk) of Samara arrived to Rostov with an admonition from the Synod, but Metropolitan Joseph did not admit his guilt in church disorders and soon, together with the vicar Bishop Eugene (Kobranov) of Rostov, signed the act of departure from the metropolitan Sergius. Prior to the widespread circulation of Metropolitan Agathangel's appeal, Metropolitan Joseph was summoned to Yaroslavl and interrogated at the local department of the Joint State Political Directorate together with Metropolitan Agafangel by Tuchkov, who arrived from Moscow, who assured Metropolitan Agathangel that the state authorities would not consider his speech against the course of Metropolitan Sergius as political and would not interfere in church affairs. At the same time, Metropolitan Joseph announced his agreement to lead a part of the Leningrad flock that had separated from Metropolitan Sergius and all others who followed their example. In a message to the Leningrad flock dated February 8, Metropolitan Joseph entrusted the temporary administration of the diocese to Bishop Demetrius (Lyubimov) and called for his name as the ruling bishop to be exalted at the divine services, following the name of the Patriarchal Locum Tenens Metropolitan Peter. At the end of February, Metropolitan Joseph was again detained, taken to Moscow, and then exiled to the Nikolo-Modena Monastery.

On March 29, 1928, the Deputy Patriarchal Locum Tenens Metropolitan Sergius (Stragorodsky) and the Provisional Patriarchal Holy Synod issued a refutation of Metropolitan Joseph's arguments about the illegality of Metropolitan Sergius' transfers of a number of bishops to other chairs. Metropolitan Sergius and the Synod explained these movements as beneficial for the Church, since the displaced bishops were not able to manage their departments, but could be called to church work in other places. Regarding Metropolitan Joseph's statements about the non-canonicity of his appointment to the Diocese of Odessa, Metropolitan Sergius and the Synod pointed out that it did not differ from the previous appointment of Metropolitan Joseph to the Diocese of Leningrad, which he did not object to. On April 11, by the decree of the Deputy Locum Tenens and the Provisional Patriarchal Holy Synod, together with other bishops who had left the subordination of Metropolitan Sergius, he was dismissed to rest with the canonical trial of the archbishops and a ban in the priesthood. Metropolitan Joseph was blamed for not obeying the appointment to the Odessa department given by the highest church authority, and his refusal to be appointed contributed to the turmoil and schism in the Leningrad diocese. Another point of accusation was Metropolitan Joseph's open statements about the departure from Metropolitan Sergius and calls for the unification of all hierarchs, who separated from the Deputy Locum Tenens.

In mid-April 1928, Metropolitan Joseph appealed to Yevgeny Tuchkov with a written request to drop the charges against him and allow him go to Leningrad, but his situation did not change. The supervision of Metropolitan Joseph at the Nikolo-Modensky Monastery was not strict and did not limit the life of the bishop and the brethren very much. Metropolitan Joseph lived in a cell with a bedroom, the windows of which overlooked the courtyard of the church, received visitors and pilgrims, spiritual children, relatives, numerous visitors. He was allowed to celebrate on great holidays in any of the three churches of the monastery. Remaining in exile, Metropolitan Joseph could not fully manage the Josephite movement led by him. Nevertheless, couriers constantly went to him, bringing news of events, decrees for signature, financial assistance, he transmitted through them practical instructions, letters, explanations, advices. Metropolitan Joseph usually directed those who personally addressed him to Bishop Demetrius (Lyubimov), appointed by him as interim administrator with requests to resolve their issues. On January 7, 1929, Archbishop Demetrius elevated bishop Demetrius to the rank of archbishop. Archbishop Demetrius kept in constant contact with Metropolitan Joseph, informed him about the events.

Metropolitan Joseph urged Archbishop Demetrius to be careful with involving new people in the movement in order to avoid provocations. Metropolitan Joseph also advocated the registration of the Josephite parishes in the state authorities, called on them to carry out their orders in relation to church affairs (taxes, patents for the production of candles, etc.), if they do not affect the foundations of faith. In his letters to Demetrius, Metropolitan Joseph particularly insisted that in no case should the commemorations of the Patriarchal Locum Tenens of Metropolitan Peter be stopped, even if in this case they would threaten reprisals. After the arrest of Archbishop Demetrius (Lyubimov) on November 29, 1929. Metropolitan Joseph appointed Bishop Sergius (Druzhinin) as the temporary administrator of the Josephite parishes, but soon, after receiving complaints about Bishop Sergius from a number of priests, he restricted his rights in administration. When the clergy addressed him, Metropolitan Joseph began to solve many issues on his own.

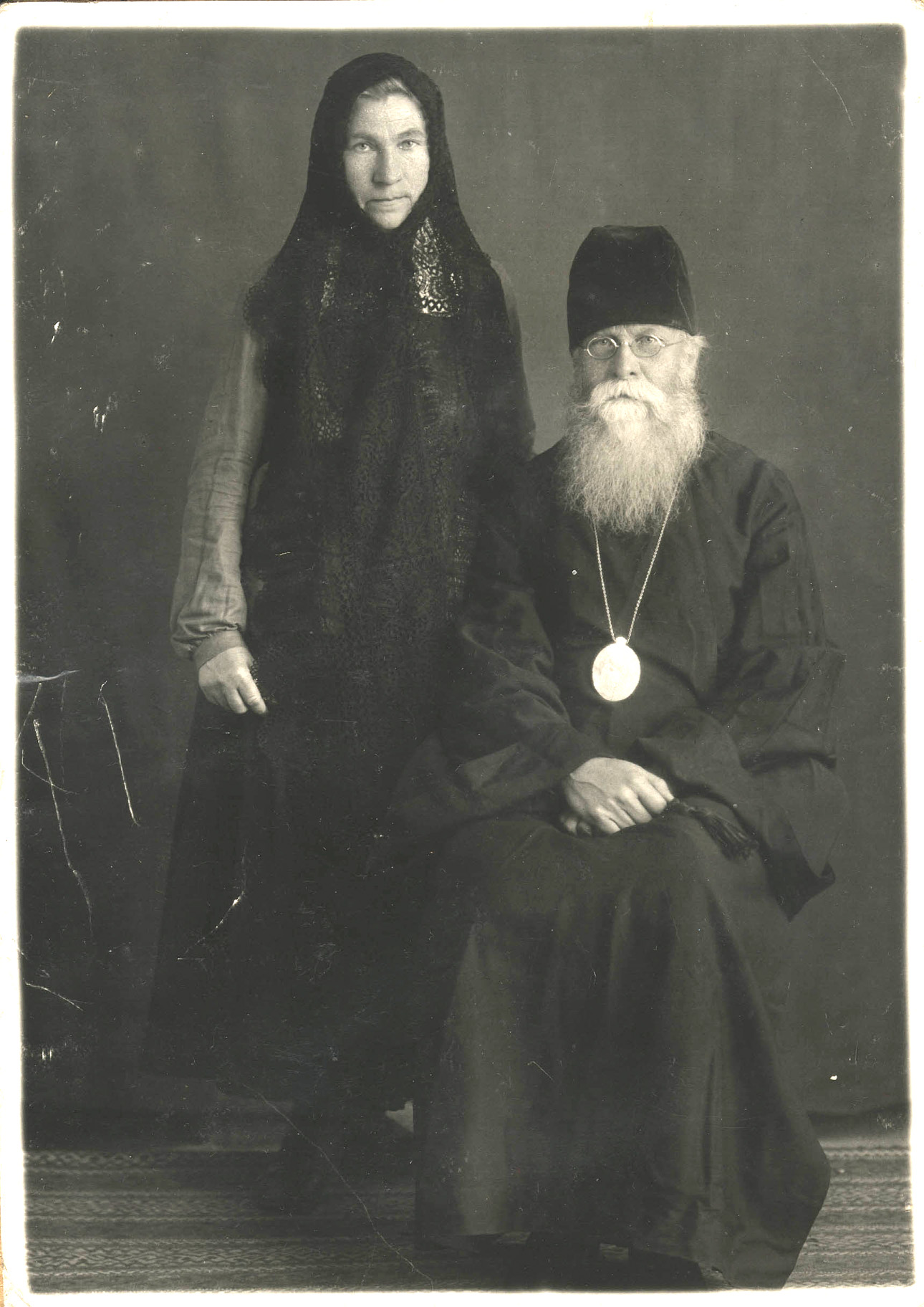
Metropolitan Joseph in exile in Shymkent. 1933

On September 12, 1930, he was arrested. He was first held in a prison in Leningrad, where he was subjected to enhanced interrogations, and in December 1930 he was transferred to the Moscow internal prison of the Joint State Political Directorate. He was held in the investigative case "The All-Union Counterrevolutionary Monarchical Organization of churchmen "The True Orthodox Church"" together with the josephite bishops, Demetrius (Lyubimov), Alexius (Buy), lay activist Mikhail Novosyolov, Archpriest Anatoly Zhurakovsky, Professor Alexei Losev and others. He was accused of heading the "ecclesial administrative center" of the organization. During the investigation, he did not hide his negative attitude to the church policy of Metropolitan Sergius, but categorically denied accusations of counterrevolution and anti-Soviet activities, stating: "After all, criticism of the words and deeds of Metropolitan Sergius is not at all criticism or an attack against the Authorities."

On September 3, 1931, Metropolitan Joseph was sentenced by Collegium of the Joint State Political Directorate to 5 years in a concentration camp, the sentence was replaced by expulsion to Kazakhstan for the same period. Since the autumn of 1931, he lived in the city of Auliye-Ata (Mirzoyan during 1936–1938, now Taraz), according to some sources, he worked briefly as an accountant at a copper mining plant. He lived in a small Kazakh adobe house on the outskirts of the town, where he occupied a room with an overhead light, furnished very modestly: there was a roughly made table, a trestle-bed on which he slept, and a couple of chairs. A small altar was built in the house, Metropolitan Joseph celebrated the liturgy daily. The metropolitan's household was run by the nun Maria (Koronatova), a former teacher from Ustyuzhna, who followed him to exile. Metropolitan Joseph maintained relations with his supporters, received envoys from different regions of the country. According to some reports, he performed secret services in illegal communities of Josephites in neighboring settlements. He corresponded with Metropolitan Kirill (Smirnov), who also was exiled in Kazakhstan, and Bishop Eugene (Kobranov). After the expiration of the exile period in 1935, he remained at his former place of residence. On June 24 (according to other sources, on September 23, 1937), he was arrested by the Mirzoyan district department of the NKVD and placed in a prison in the town of Shymkent. He was in the same case with Metropolitan Kirill and Bishop Eugene, accused of leading a "counter-revolutionary insurgent organization of churchmen." On November 19, a by special troika of the NKVD of the South Kazakhstan Oblast he was sentenced to death. He was executed on 20 November 1937 together with Metropolitan Kirill and Bishop Eugene in the Lisya Balka tract near Shymkent (now part of Shymkent).

== Legacy ==
In 1981, Metropolitan Joseph was glorified as a New Martyr by decision of the synod of bishops of the Russian Orthodox Church Outside Russia. The name of Metropolitan Joseph was named among the few New Martyrs whose names were made public directly at the Council.

On September 15, 2012, a commemorative plaque made of black marble was installed in the town of Ustyuzhna (now Vologda Oblast), with the inscription in pre revolutionary orthography "in house No. 14 on this lane (former Kazansky) in 1872, the Holy Martyr Joseph, Metropolitan of Petrograd (secular name of Ivan Semyonovich Petrovykh), was born and lived the first 17 years of his life. Shot in 1937".

== Literature ==
- Артемов Н. Новосвященномученик Иосиф Петроградский // Вестник Германской епархии РПЦЗ. 1999. - No. 2. - С. 7–11
- Сахаров, Михаил; Сикорская, Лидия, eds. (2011). Священномученик Иосиф, митрополит Петроградский: Жизнеописание и труды (PDF). Новомученики и исповедники Российские пред лицом богоборческой власти (in Russian). М.: Братонеж; СПб.: Кифа. ISBN 978-5-7873-0654-5.
- Шкаровский М. В. Иосиф (Петровых) // Православная энциклопедия. — М., 2011. — Т. XXV : «Иоанна деяния — Иосиф Шумлянский». — С. 649–653.
