= Catacomb Church =

Illegal Russian Orthodox communities after the 1920s

The Catacomb Church (Russian: Катакомбная церковь, romanized: Katakombnaya tserkov') as a collective name labels those representatives of the Russian Orthodox clergy, laity, communities, monasteries, brotherhoods, etc., who for various reasons, moved to an illegal position from the 1920s onwards. In a narrow sense, the term "catacomb church" means not just illegal communities, but communities that rejected subordination to the acting patriarchal locum tenens Metropolitan Sergius (Stragorodsky) after 1927, and that adopted anti-Soviet positions. During the Cold War of 1947-1991 the Russian Orthodox Church Outside of Russia (the ROCOR) popularized the term in the latter sense, first within the Russian diaspora, and then in the USSR (by sending illegal literature there). The expression "True Orthodox church" (Russian: истинно-православная церковь, romanized: istinno-pravoslavnaya tserkov) is synonymous with this latter, narrower sense of "catacomb church".

The historian Mikhail Shkarovsky argues that "the catacombness of the Church does not necessarily mean its intransigence. This term covers all unofficial and therefore not state-controlled church activities".

Organizationally, the Catacomb Church communities were usually not interconnected.

Unofficial Muslim, Catholic, Protestant, Judaic and Uniate groups in the Soviet Union also engaged in similar Catacomb-like activity.

From the 1990s some (though not all) Catacomb Church groups began to emerge from the "underground" and to affiliate with various more-mainstream Orthodox bodies.

== Origin ==
The death of Patriarch Tikhon, the leader of the Russian Orthodox Church in April 1925 led to unrest among the followers of the church. Tikhon's designated successors were arrested by the civil authorities. Metropolitan Sergius became the Acting patriarchal locum tenens of the Moscow Patriarchate. Sergius issued a declaration in 1927 calling all members of the Russian Orthodox Church to profess loyalty towards the Soviet government. The declaration sparked division among the hierarchy, clergy, and laity, which led to the formation of the Russian True Orthodox Church, or Catacomb Church, a group of which was the Josephite movement.

Opposition to Sergius' declaration was based not only on his political concessions, but also on canonical and theological disagreements.

== Terminology ==
The earliest documented use of the word "catacombs" to describe the Russian realities of the 20th century is found in the letters of abbess Athanasia (Gromeko) to Metropolitan Eulogius (Georgievsky), written in 1923 from Petrograd. After the nuns were expelled from their church building by the Renovationists, the community did not disband, but continued its existence as a convent in a private home. In two of the four surviving letters, abbess Athanasia uses the expressions "my catacombs" and "my secret catacomb church" several times. It can be seen from the context that this is how she designates her house church, contrasting her "catacombs" with the officially functioning church of the Renovationists.

The use of the expressions "catacombs" and "catacomb church" in relation to the 1920s–1930s realities showed a certain educational and cultural level of those who used these concepts. This is because people who called their existence "catacomb" compared it with the life of early Christians, who allegedly secretly gathered during the persecution to hold religious ceremonies in the catacombs of Rome. So, the persecutions that befell the Church under Soviet rule were likened to the persecutions of the first centuries of Christianity. According to historian Alexey Beglov, the term "catacombs" and its derivatives were a local Petrograd/Leningrad neologism, where there were many active church intellectuals who could appreciate the diversity of meanings associated with this word.

Meanwhile, in the 1920s and 1930s, the term "catacomb church" was not widely used; other expressions were used more often. In letters sent during 1923 to the Commission for Religious Cults under the Central Executive Committee of the RSFSR from North Caucasus and from Middle Asia, and later from the Central Black Earth Region, there were references to "Old Orthodox" and "True Orthodox Christians" who opposed themselves to the Renovationists. In these documents, it is not the legal position of the parish that comes to the fore, but its attitude to the Renovationist Higher Church Administration and attitude to the "Living Church". In addition, opponents of the Renovationists used the self-designation "Tikhonites".

The term "Catacomb Church" began to be actively used in the works of Ivan Andreyev, a figure of the Josephite movement who fled to Western Europe in 1944, under the influence of whose works this term became widespread in emigrant periodicals. Other emigrants of the second wave of Russian emigration noted the purely foreign nature of the expression "catacomb church". Since its resumption in 1947, the magazine Orthodox Russia had been running the column "And the Light Shines in Darkness" with the subtitle "Soviet Catacombs of the Spirit", in which everything related to the everyday side of the underground Soviet church life was published. The catacomb church was described as the only force opposing the godless regime. In the works of Russian Orthodox Church Outside of Russia (ROCOR) authors, the typical image of the catacomb church was formed: ecclesiastical and political opposition to the leadership of the Moscow Patriarchate, illegality from the point of view of Soviet legislation, and consistent anti-Soviet sentiments of its members. Such "catacombists" were perceived as a staunch fighter against the regime. In this form, the expression "catacomb church" became an instrument of ideological polemics used by the ROCOR. According to the ideologists of the ROCOR, the powerful underground church in the USSR which was in opposition to the Moscow Patriarchate proved the illegitimacy of the official hierarchy.

In journalism, this term has passed into the official documents of the ROCOR. The ROCOR Bishops' Council of 1956 declared that only "the Catacomb Church has preserved purity and fidelity to the spirit of the ancient Apostolic Church" and enjoys "respect among the people." On September 14, 1971, the ROCOR Bishops' Council officially adopted a resolution, which implied that the ROCOR was in communion with the "Catacomb Church", but not with the Moscow Patriarchate. This position was criticized by people who directly knew church life in the USSR. Archpriest Vasily Vinogradov, who fled the USSR and served 6 years in Soviet camps, noted that Metropolitan Anastasius (Gribanovsky), who headed the ROCOR, and the hierarchs subordinated to him, wanted to live in a myth about the supposedly numerous catacomb Church that existed in Russia, and considered them as doing wishful thinking. Another refugee from the USSR, Natalia Kiter, a spiritual writer and an active participant in the church life and the underground Orthodox brotherhoods in Leningrad until 1941, complained to Metropolitan Anastasius that Orthodox Russia was distorting her articles about ascetics and martyrs among the clergy of the Moscow Patriarchate. She said that Orthodox Russia changed her articles to state that those member of the Moscow Patriarchate were catacombists rejecting the Moscow Patriarchate. In response to her protests, the editorial board of Orthodox Russia replied: "The truth is extremely harmful for the cause of the church in America."

In 1974, Alexander Solzhenitsyn, who was exiled from the USSR, addressed an open letter to the participants of the 3rd All-Diaspora Council of the Russian Orthodox Church organised by the ROCOR, where, among other things, he criticized the "pious dream" of the existence of the "sinless – but also bodiless – catacomb" (о «сколь безгрешной, столь и бестелесной катакомбе»). He also stated that the Catacomb Church should not replace the "real Russian Orthodox people" in the eyes of the Russian diaspora. Solzhenitsyn wrote that the Catacomb Church as a whole is more a myth than a reality, that secret communities took place only because of the lack of functioning churches. He claims that after the weakening of the atheist dictatorship and the opening of churches, the problem of underground parishes has practically disappeared, and that most Eastern Orthodox Christians, including former Catacomb Church members, were using the official churches of the Moscow Patriarchate. The appeal of Alexander Solzhenitsyn caused a heated debate, revealing the opposing positions of the disputants. Some completely denied the existence of the Catacomb Church, while others sought to prove the opposite and thereby justify their own position which was irreconcilable with the respect due to the official Church in the USSR (the Moscow Patriarchate). Solzhenitsyn's opinion was not met with sympathy by the leadership of the ROCOR. In 1975, First Hierarch of ROCOR Metropolitan Philaret (Voznesensky) wrote to Solzhenitsyn that not only priests, but also bishops were part of the Catacomb Church.

In the 1960s and 1970s, through illegal literature published abroad, and then through samizdat, the concepts of "catacombs" and "catacomb church" returned to the USSR. After that, some authors in the USSR used the word "catacomb" to designate ecclesiastical opposition to the Moscow Patriarchate, while others used it as a technical term as a synonym for the epithet "illegal" from the point of view of Soviet legislation. Since the second half of the 1980s, in connection with the policy of glasnost, the concept of "catacombs" has returned to journalism.

== Literature ==
- "Introduction to Russia's Catacomb Saints". Orthodox Christian Information Center.
- Шкаровский, Михаил (1999). Русская Православная Церковь при Сталине и Хрущеве [The Russian Orthodox Church under Stalin and Khrushchev] (PDF). Moscow: Крутицкое Патриаршее Подворье, Общество любителей церковной истории.
- Беглов, Алексей (2008). В поисках «безгрешных катакомб». Церковное подполье в СССР [In search of "sinless catacombs". The Church underground in the USSR]. Moscow: Издательский Совет Русской Православной Церкви, «Арефа». ISBN 978-5-94625-303-1.
- Graham, Loren; Kantor, Jean-Michel (2009). Naming Infinity: A True Story of Religious Mysticism and Mathematical Creativity. Harvard University Press. pp. 133–34. ISBN 978-0-674-05391-5.
- В. Г. Пидгайко. ИСТИННО ПРАВОСЛАВНЫЕ ХРИСТИАНЕ // Православная энциклопедия. — М. : Церковно-научный центр «Православная энциклопедия», 2011. — Т. XXVII. — С. 704-716.
- Маковецкий А. В., "Роль участников катакомбного движения в организационном оформлении епархий Русской Православной Церкви заграницей на канонической территории Московского Патриархата (1982—1994 гг.)" // Церковно-исторический вестник. 2013—2014. — № 20/21. — С. 218—225
- Кострюков, Андрей (2020). К истории взаимоотношений между Русской Зарубежной Церковью и катакомбным движением на родине в 1970—1980-х гг. [On the History of the Relationship between the Russian Church Abroad and the Catacomb Movement at Home in the 1970s and 1980s] (PDF). Церковь и время. 1 (90): 118–136.
- Moss, Vladimir (1991-12-01). "The true orthodox church of Russia". Religion in Communist Lands. 19 (3–4): 239–250. doi:10.1080/09637499108431518. ISSN 0307-5974.
