= Moscow Theological Academy =

Educational institution of Russian Orthodox Church

- Московская духовная академия
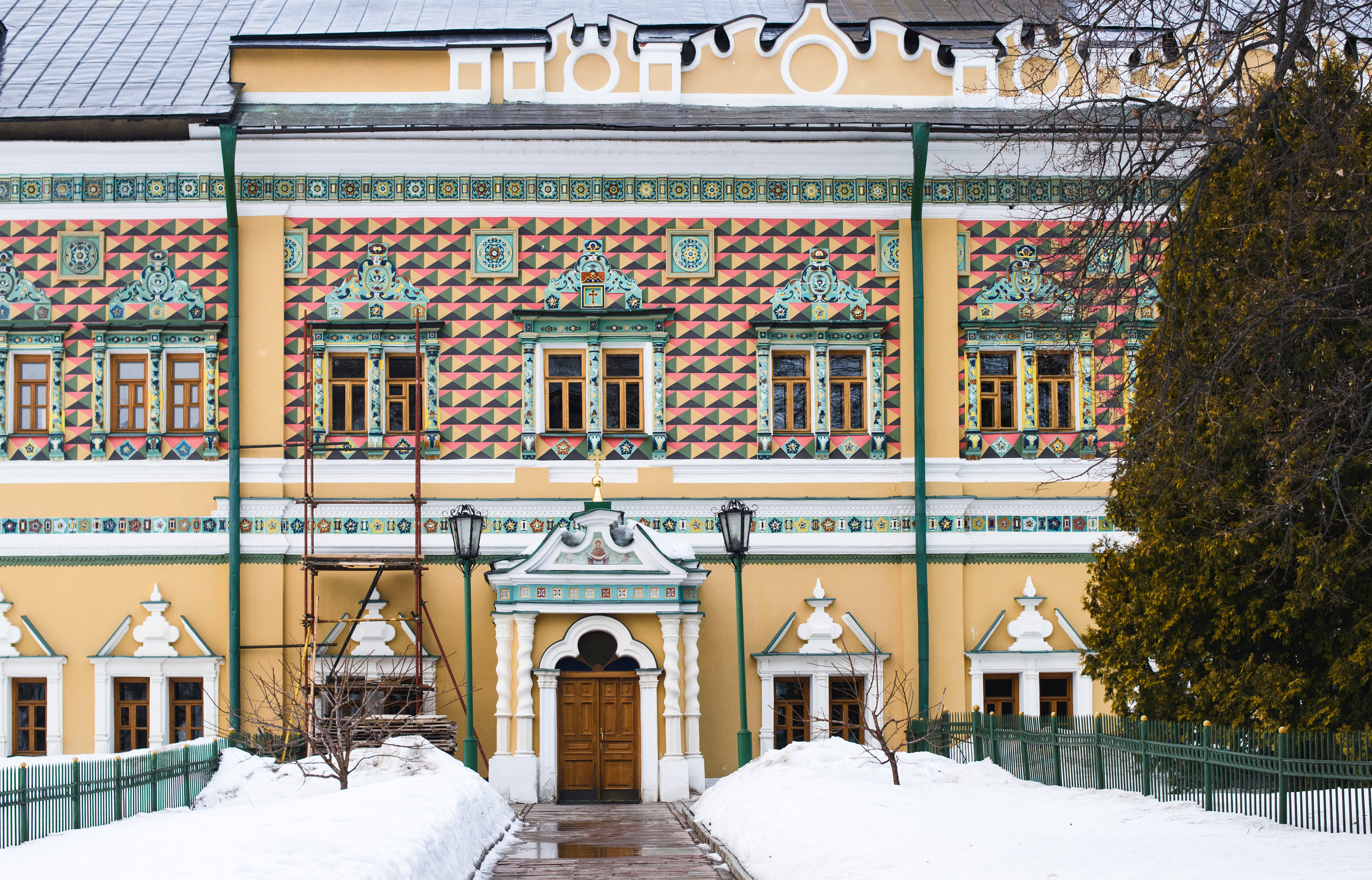
- Active: 1685–1919, 1944–present
- Rector: Cyril (Zinkovsky)
- Location: Sergiyev Posad, Russia; 56.3116°N 38.1311°E
- Website: mpda.ru

Moscow Theological Academy (Russian: Московская духовная академия) is a higher educational institution of the Russian Orthodox Church, training clergy, teachers, scholars, and officials.

The Academy traces its origin to the Slavic Greek Latin Academy, which was founded in 1685 by the Greek Lichud brothers. It was reorganized in 1814 and moved from Moscow to the Trinity Lavra of St. Sergius in the town of Sergiyev Posad, Moscow Oblast. The academy was closed in 1919, and reopened in 1944.

== History ==
=== Academy in 1814-1917 ===
In 1814, the Moscow Slavic Greek Latin Academy moved from Moscow to the Trinity-Sergius Lavra. The grand opening of the Academy in the Lavra took place on October 1, 1814. Now it has become known as the Moscow Theological Academy. The training at the Academy consisted of two two-year courses. At the opening of classes in 1814, the following subjects were read: interpretation of the Holy Scriptures, philosophy, world literature, general civil history, mathematics, languages: Hebrew, Greek, German, French and English. In 1816, lecturing of dogmatic theology was begun, since 1817 moral theology and comparative theology added. The program also included other subjects: pastoral theology, church eloquence, church history, canon law (since 1840), patristics (since 1841), metaphysics (since 1842), history of philosophy (since 1843), biblical history, Russian civil history, church archaeology (since 1844). In this form, the program lasted until 1869. Special importance was attached to the study of ancient languages: Greek and Latin, in the study of which students achieved considerable success.

From 1835 to 1841, the position of rector was held by Archimandrite Philaret (Gumilyevsky), who initiated the publication of the works of the Holy Fathers at the Moscow Theological Academy. In January 1842 first translations of the works of St. Gregory the Theologian was presented. At the same time "Additions to the works of the Holy Fathers" was created. Having begun systematic publishing activity with a series of patristic works, the Academy embarked on the path of revival of Orthodox theology. The "Additions" published articles of church-historical and theological content. This is the first scientific journal of the Academy. The Moscow Theological Academy also took part in the translation of the Bible into Russian.

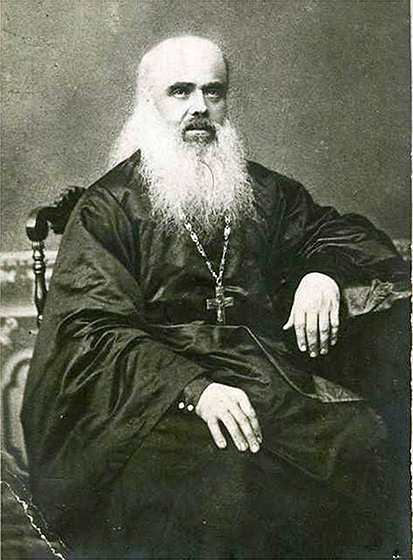
Alexander Gorsky

The years of rectorship of Archpriest Alexander Gorsky, 1862-1875, became one of the most scientifically striking periods in the history of the Moscow Theological Academy. During this time preparation and implementation of the reforms of the 1860s could not but affect the life of religious educational institutions. George Florovsky wrote: "According to the new Charter, the Theological Academies were given a twofold task. It was supposed to be not only a theological higher school, but also a kind of pedagogical institute of the spiritual department. And the Academies did not so much prepare for pastoral work, as for pedagogical activity. Hence the inevitable multiplicity of subjects and dispersion. Other subjects were taught only then in order to prepare teachers for lower-level schools according to them." The academic Charter came into effect in 1869. The Charter of 1869 generally met the requirements of its time and helped Archpriest Alexander Gorsky to expediently direct the life of the Academy. Under Gorsky leadership, with the support of Metropolitan Innocent (Veniaminov) of Moscow, a church was built in the academic assembly hall in the building of the Royal Palaces, consecrated on February 12, 1870 in honor of the Intercession of the Most Holy Theotokos. Following the church, Archpriest Alexander Gorsky achieved the creation of an academic cemetery on the territory of the Academy garden.

In 1884, a new Charter of theological academies was introduced. The Charter eliminated the autonomy of theological academies and seminaries, strengthening supervision of students. New trends in the life of the Academy were introduced by the rector Archimandrite Anthony (Khrapovitsky) (1890-1895), formerly the rector of the St. Petersburg Theological Seminary. Under Archimandrite Anthony, in 1892, the publication of "Additions to the Works of the Holy Fathers" continued under the new name "Theological Bulletin" (Богословский вестник). Patristic creations have now been published as appendices to the new magazine.

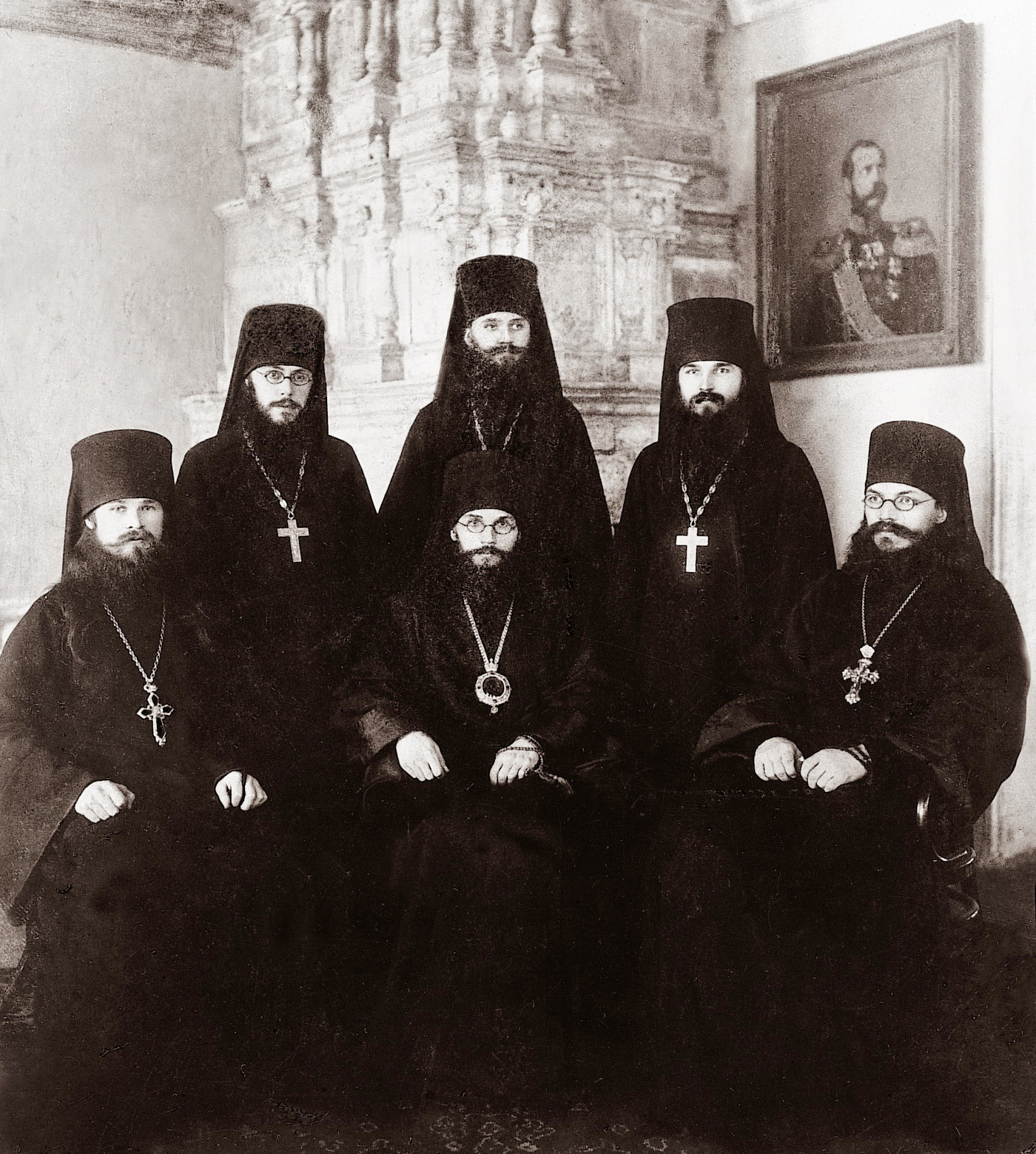
Sitting: Archimandrite Varlaam (Ryashentsev), Bishop Theodore (Pozdeevsky), Archimandrite Simeon (Kholmogorov); standing from left to right: Hieromonk Gurias (Stepanov), hieromonk Philip (Gumilyevsky), hieromonk Herman (Ryashentsev). 1909-1910.

On March 13, 1898, Archimandrite Arsenius (Stadnitsky) was appointed rector. On February 28, 1899, he was consecrated as titular bishop of Volokolamsk, vicar of the Diocese of Moscow, preserving the post of rector of the Academy. Since that time, the Academy has been regularly headed by a rector in the episcopal rank. In 1909 bishop Theodore (Pozdeevsky) became rector. In the late 19th — early 20th centuries, the issue of a new reform of theological schools was discussed in church circles. The reform of church education was also discussed in 1906 at the Pre-Council Presence. After an active discussion, the Most Holy Synod worked out a new statute, adopted in 1910 and supplemented in 1912.

From July 7 to July 14, 1917 the All-Russian Congress of Learned Monasticism gathered at the Academy. In September 1917, for the first time in the history of the Academy, the election of the rector took place. Anatoly Orlov, professor of the Department of History and Denunciation of Western Confessions, was elected rector. A month later, the newly elected rector was ordained a priest. The last remarkable event of academic life was the celebration of the 50th anniversary of the death of Metropolitan Philaret (Drozdov), which took place on November 18 and 19, 1917.

=== Soviet era ===
The decree of January 23, 1918 On separation of Church from State and school from Church prohibited "the teaching of religious doctrines in all state and public, as well as private educational institutions," but the decree of the People's Commissariat of Justice of August 24 of the same year allowed the teaching of religious doctrines in "specially theological" institutions. In 1918, the last set of applicants was held at the Moscow Theological Academy. On August 22, the lectures began. On October 1, the annual act took place, which was attended by Patriarch Tikhon, who celebrated the liturgy in the Academic Church of The Intercession of the Most Holy Theotokos on the same day. The academic year was difficult, there were only four classrooms at the disposal of the Academy, the number of students was significantly reduced. Serious problems with the financing of the Academy began. March 2, 1919 The Board of the Academy adopted a resolution on the termination of the "Theological Bulletin". In the spring of 1919 the school year was completed ahead of schedule due to lack of funding and the seizure of academic buildings by the state. After the final closure of the classes in Sergiev Posad, the Academy continued its activity at the churches of Moscow until the end of the 1920s. All books, archives and manuscripts from the Academy's book depositories were withdrawn to the vaults or funds of the Lenin Library in the 1930s.

On September 4, 1943, the Kremlin hosted a meeting of the Joseph Stalin, with the hierarchs of the Russian Orthodox Church — Patriarchal Locum Tenens Metropolitan Sergius (Stragorodsky), Metropolitan Alexy (Simansky) of Leningrad and Metropolitan Nicholas (Yarushevich) of Kiev and Galicia. One of the most important results of this meeting was an agreement on the revival of theological education. On June 14, 1944, the grand opening of the Orthodox Theological Institute and Theological and Pastoral courses took place in Novodevichy Convent. On August 28, 1944, the Holy Synod appointed Archpriest Tikhon Popov, a graduate of the Kiev Theological Academy (1896-1900), as rector. At the suggestion of the Council for the Affairs of the Russian Orthodox Church, teachers of theological educational institutions were classified as qualified workers of public education and received ration cards, the same as university teachers. Students received work cards, they were granted a deferral from conscription for mobilization. On the wave of popular enthusiasm associated with the victorious end of the Second World War, it seemed that the newly opened theological schools were opening up huge prospects in the field of the revival of spiritual education. The teachers hoped that the state would not prevent the publication of scientific and theological periodicals and monographs. The Educational Committee at the Synod at a meeting on August 26, 1946 decided to transform the Orthodox Theological Institute to the Moscow Theological Academy with a four-year course of study. The third and forth courses of the Institute became the first and second courses of the Academy, and the preparatory courses and the first two courses of the Institute became a Seminary with a four-year program. Administratively, the Academy and the Seminary were united. The two-pronged theological school became officially called "Moscow Theological Academy and Seminary". In October 1948 the Moscow Theological Academy and Seminary returned to the Trinity-Sergius Lavra. By 1957, All historical buildings were returned to the Academy.

After the secret resolution of the Central Committee of the CPSU "On the shortcomings of scientific and atheistic propaganda" dated October 4, 1958, state bodies began to actively interfere in the admission process of applicants. Komsomol and party leaders, employees of state security agencies met with young men who applied for admission to the Moscow Theological Seminary and tried in every way to keep them from this step. During the entrance exams, applicants were unexpectedly called to military training, and those who entered were denied registration. The number of students of theological schools began to decline. Soon it was decided not to allow admission to religious educational institutions of persons who had special secondary and higher education. It was forbidden to publish textbooks, to teach general education subjects. Teaching of classical languages was reduced to minimum. In 1969, a regent class was formed at the Academy, which was transformed into a Regent School in 1985. At that time it was the only possible form of women's religious education. In the late 1970s - early 1980s, teachers with university humanities education were accepted to Moscow theological schools, and they received knowledge in the field of church sciences independently.

A great disaster for the Moscow Theological Academy and Seminary was a fire on the night of September 27–28, 1986. 5 seminary students died, a dormitory with an assembly hall burned down, the Intercession Church was damaged. Restoration work was completed by 1988.

=== Since 1991 ===
In the 1990s all the restrictions with which the Soviet government tried to slow down the development of theological schools and theological science were completely lifted, but new difficulties appeared, mainly related to the difficult economic situation in Russia and with limited funding for theological education.

The resumption of the "Theological Bulletin" took place in 1993, when the first episodic issues began to be published.

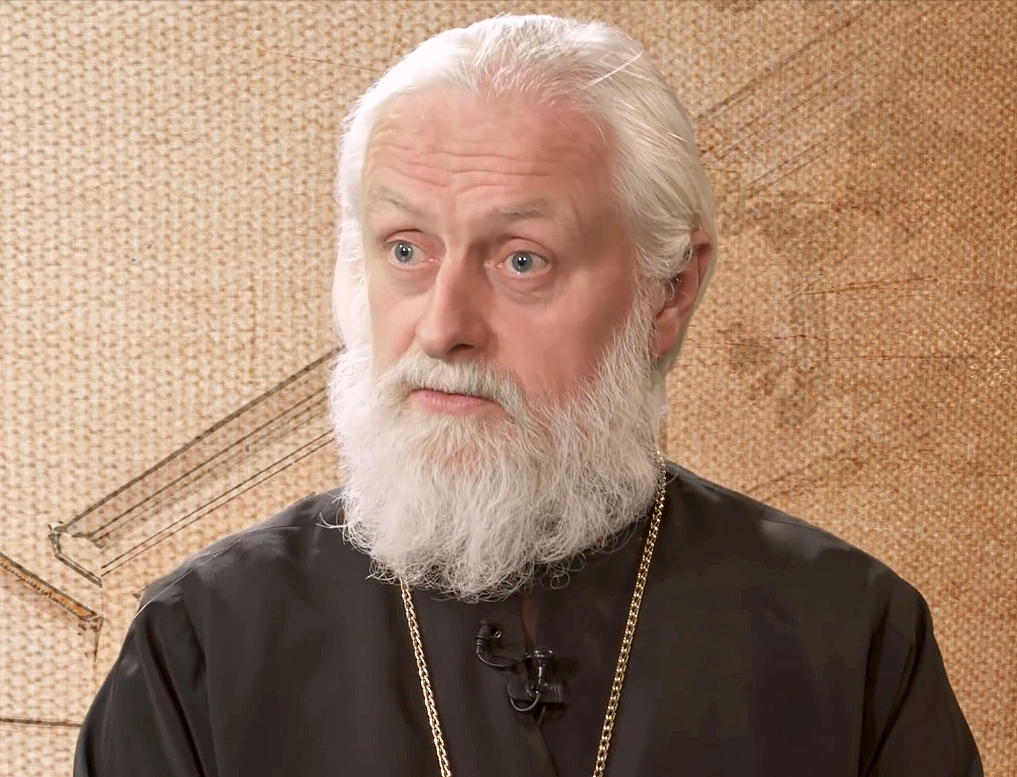
Eugene Reshetnikov

On July 18, 1995, Bishop Eugene (Reshetnikov) was appointed rector of the Moscow Theological Academy and Seminary. In order to activate the process of reforming the system of theological education in the Russian Orthodox Church, the position of rector was combined with the position of Chairman of the Educational Committee at the Holy Synod. Bishop Eugene granted creative freedom for the initiatives of a number of initiative teachers both in the field of teaching and in the implementation of a number of publishing and spiritual and educational projects. The Academy had its own small publishing house, which for several years was headed by hieromonk Euthymius (Moiseyev). A number of Cabinets were created: Greek, Pedagogical, Biblical, which initially took over part of the work to improve information support and the quality of teaching in the relevant fields. Thanks to the efforts of a group of teachers, a language reform was carried out on the basis of the Greek Cabinet after which the teaching of classical languages was restored in the Seminary and then in the Academy.

Back in 1994, the Bishops' Council decided to prepare by 2000 a program for the transition to a system of theological education, within which seminaries should become higher schools that train clergymen, while academies should be transformed into research centers that provide theological specialization. On the basis of the Council's definition, a working group was created to develop in detail the concept of a new system of theological education. Proposals were developed to reform the system of theological education, which, with clarifications, were approved by the Holy Synod on December 27, 1996.

Since 2000, there have been language courses and study-abroad programme opportunities.

Since 2016, the "Theological Bulletin" has been published on a permanent basis, with four issues a year. In 2019 journals "Theological Questions" (Вопросы богословия) and "Metaphrast" (Метафраст), "The Church Historian" (Церковный историк), "Praxis", "Word and Image. Questions of the Study of Christian Literary Heritage" («Слово и образ. Вопросы изучения христианского литературного наследия») and "Bulletin of Church Art and Archaeology" (Вестник церковного искусства и археологии) has been launched. In 2020 journal "Biblical Scholia" (Библейские схолии) has been launched.

On February 5, 2021, the Postgraduate Department of the Moscow Theological Academy received state accreditation.

== Rectors ==
- Palladius (Rogovsky) (1700-1703)
- Raphael (Krasnopolsky) (1703-1704)
- Sylvester (Kraisky) (1704-1705)
- Anthony (Karmsky) (1705-1706)
- Theophylact (Lopatinsky) (1706-1722)
- Gideon (Vishnevsky) (1722-1728)
- Herman (Koptsevich) (1728-1731)
- Stefan (Kalinovsky) (1734-1735)
- Mitrophan (Slotvensky) (1737-1739)
- Platon Levitsky (1739-1741)
- Porphyry (Kraysky) (1743-1748)
- Gennadius (Dranitsyn) (1757-1758)
- Gideon (Slominsky) (1758-1761)
- Gabriel (Petrov-Shaposhnikov) (1761 - 1763)
- Gennadius (Granitsky) (1764-1768)
- Anthony (Gerasimov-Zybelin) (1768)
- Theophylact (Gorsky) (1769-1774)
- Ambrose (Podobedov) (1774-1778)
- Damascene (Rudnev) (1778-1782)
- Paul (Ponomaryov) (1782-1783)
- Apollos (Baibakov) (1783-1786)
- Methodius (Smirnov) (1791-1794)
- Ambrose (Yakovlev-Orlin) (1794-1795)
- Eulampius (Vvedensky) (1795-1799)
- Seraphim (Glagolevsky) (1798-1799)
- Vladimir (Tretyakov) (1799-1801)
- Augustine (Vinogradsky) (1801-1804)
- Moses (Bliznetsov-Platonov) (1804-1807)
- Sergius (Krylov-Platonov) (1808-1810)
- Simeon (Krylov-Platonov) (1810-1816)
- Philaret (Amfiteatrov) (March 16, 1816 — June 1, 1819)
- Kirill (Bogoslovsky-Platonov) (May 1819 - 1824)
- Polycarp (Gaitannikov) (November 4, 1824 - 14 December 1835)
- Philaret (Gumilevsky) (December 14, 1835-1841)
- Eusebius (Orlinsky) (1841-1847)
- Alexius (Rzhanitsyn) (1847-1853)
- Eugene (Sakharov) (August 31, 1853 - 1857)
- Sergius (Lyapidevsky) (October 4, 1857-21 January 1861)
- Sabbas (Tikhomirov) (January 21, 1861 — November 4, 1862)
- Alexander Gorsky (1862-1875)
- Michael (Luzin) (February 11, 1876 — December 1876)
- Sergey Smirnov (1878-1886)
- Christopher (Smirnov) (July 30, 1886 - 13 December 1890)
- Anthony (Khrapovitsky) (1890 - 1895)
- Lawrence (Nekrasov) (July 17, 1895 - March 13, 1898)
- Arsenius (Stadnitsky) (March 13, 1898 - 5 December 1903)
- Evdokim (Meshchersky) (December 9, 1903 - 1906)
- Theodore (Pozdeevsky) (August 1906 - 13 March 1917)
- Hilarion (Troitsky) (March — September 1917) Acting
- Anatoly Orlov (September 10, 1917 - April 1922)
- Vladimir Strakhov (1922 - end 1920s)
- Tikhon Popov (August 28, 1944 - 23 October 1946)
- Nikolai Chepurin (October 23, 1946 - 7 February 1947)
- Sergey Savinsky (February 7 — October 28, 1947) Acting
- Hermogenes (Kozhin) (October 28, 1947 - 11 August 1949)
- Alexander Smirnov (August 15, 1949 - 19 September 1950)
- Vladimir Vertogradov (1950-1951) Acting
- Konstantin Ruzhitsky (August 1951 — November 18, 1964)
- Philaret (Denisenko) (December 22, 1964 — May 14, 1966)
- Philaret (Vakhromeyev) (May 14, 1966 - 18 April 1973)
- Vladimir (Sabodan) (April 18, 1973 — July 16, 1982)
- Alexander (Timofeyev) (July 16, 1982 — August 12, 1992)
- Philaret (Karagodin) (August 12, 1992 — 17 July 1995)
- Eugene (Reshetnikov) (July 17, 1995 — July 14, 2018)
- Ambrose (Yermakov) (July 14, 2018 — August 30, 2019)
- Pitirim (Tvorogov) (August 30, 2019 — August 25, 2020)
- Theodoritus (Tikhonov) (August 25, 2020 — August 25, 2022)
- Cyril (Zinkovsky) (since August 25, 2022)

== Literature ==
- Кедров Н. И. Московская духовная семинария, 1814—1889 : Краткий исторический очерк с приложением списков начальников, наставников и воспитанников. — М. : типолитогр. т-ва И. Н. Кушнерев и Ко, 1889. — IV, 162, 158 с.
- Салтыков А., свящ. Краткий очерк истории Московской Духовной Академии // Богословские труды. — 1986. - Сб.: 300-летие МДА. — С. 73—112.
- Голубцов С. А. Московская Духовная Академия в революционную эпоху. Академия в социальном движении и служении в начале XX века : по материалам архивов, мемуаров и публикаций. — М. : Мартис, 1999. — 254 с. — ISBN 5-7248-0065-9
- Езова, Людмила (2005). "Московская Духовная Академия в конце XIX начале ХХ в". Россия и современный мир (in Russian) (1): 221–237.
- "Московская духовная академия". Orthodox Encyclopedia (in Russian). Vol. XLVII. Moscow. 2017. pp. 153–187.
