= Nizhny Novgorod electoral district =

Historical electoral district in Russia

Nizhny Novgorod
- Former Civilian constituency for the All-Russian Constituent Assembly
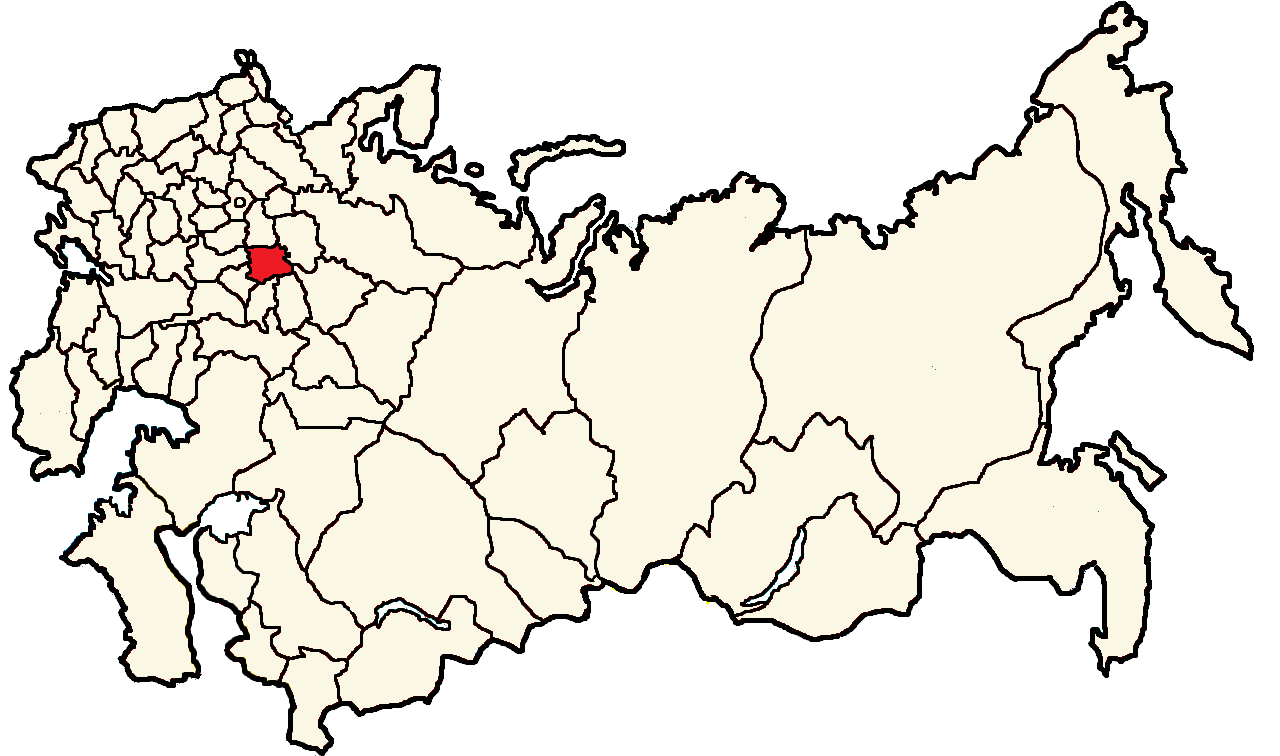

Former constituency
- Created: 1917
- Abolished: 1918
- Number of members: 9
- Number of Uyezd Electoral Commissions: 11
- Number of Urban Electoral Commissions: 3
- Number of Parishes: 252

The Nizhny Novgorod electoral district (Russian: Нижегородский избирательный округ) was a constituency created for the 1917 Russian Constituent Assembly election. The electoral district covered the Nizhny Novgorod Governorate. Nine seats in the Constituent Assembly were assigned to the Nizhny Novgorod constituency.

Only in the Nizhny Novgorod constituency could the combined forces of clergy and far right make an electoral impact. The Christian Union for Faith and Fatherland had a relative success.

== Results ==
Nizhny Novgorod
Party	Vote	%	Seats
List 3 - Socialist-Revolutionaries and the Soviet of Peasants Deputies	314,004	54.15	6
List 7 - Bolsheviks	133,950	23.10	2
List 11 - Christian Union for Faith and Fatherland	48,428	8.35	1
List 12 - Kadets	34,726	5.99	
List 8 - All Muslim Socialist Bloc	19,935	3.44	
List 5 - Union of Old Believer Accord	16,230	2.80	
List 2 - Mensheviks	7,634	1.32	
List 10 - Popular Socialists	2,666	0.46	
List 6 - Ukrainian Group	126	0.02	
Unaccounted	2,198	0.38	
Total:	579,897		9

Deputies Elected
Sergius	Christian Unity
Fokeev	SR
Kutuzov	SR
Lukyanov	SR
Rakov	SR
Sumgin	SR
Tyurikov	SR
Danilov	Bolshevik
Romanov	Bolshevik

The result given by Radkey, used in the table above, doesn't include List 4 - Cooperative Group, List 9 - Landowners and Progressive Democrats and List 1 - Voters Group of Gorbatovsky Uezd.
