= Nicholas Yarushevich =

Bishop of the Russian Orthodox Church

Nicholas
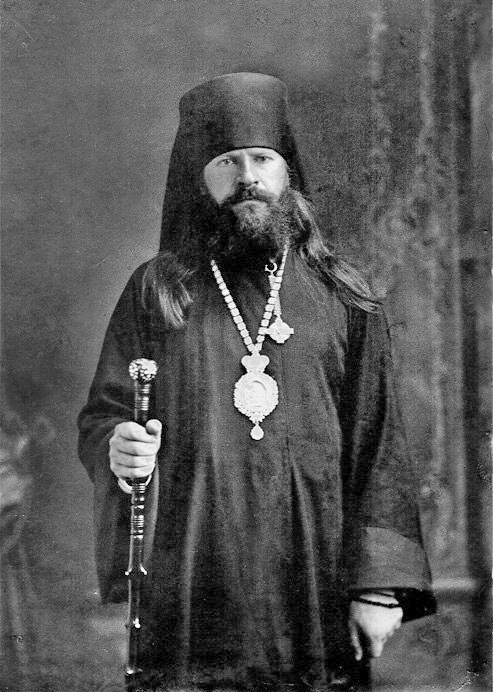
- Church: Russian Orthodox Church
- Metropolis: Metropolitan of Krutitsy and Kolomna
- See: Moscow
- Installed: 28 January 1944
- Term ended: 19 September 1960
- Predecessor: Alexander
- Successor: John
- Other posts: Metropolitan of Kiev, Galicia, Exarch of Ukraine; Governing in Finland (temporarily); Metropolitan of Volyn and Lutsk, Exarch in western regions of Ukraine and Belarus; Archbishop of Petergof

Orders
- Ordination: 1914
- Consecration: 7 April 1922 by Benjamin (Kazansky), Aleksiy (Simansky), Artemiy (Ilyinsky), Venedikt (Plotnikov)

Personal details
- Born: Boris Dorofeyevich Yarushevich; 12 January 1892 Kovno, Russian Empire
- Died: 13 December 1961 (aged 69) Moscow, Soviet Union

Metropolitan Nicholas (Russian: Митрополит Николай; born Boris Dorofeyevich Yarushevich, Russian: Борис Дорофеевич Ярушевич; 12 January 1892 – 13 December 1961) was the metropolitan of Kiev in the Patriarchate of Moscow.

== Biography ==
Metropolitan Nicholas was born in Kovno (now Kaunas, Lithuania), where his father, Archpriest Dorofey Filofeyevich Yarushevich, was rector of Alexander Nevsky Cathedral. He was educated at St Petersburg University, and graduated in 1914 from the Saint Petersburg Theological Academy. Soon after he was ordained, he was sent to the front during the war with Germany, but was recalled in 1915 after falling seriously ill. In 1918, he was appointed rector of the Saints Peter and Paul Cathedral in Petrograd (St Petersburg). On March 25, 1922 he was consecrated Bishop of Peterhof, vicar of the Petrograd dioscese, but he was almost immediately arrested for refusing to recognise the so-called Renovationism.

He was released in 1927, when he supported the declaration of Metropolitan Sergius, who controversially pledged loyalty of the Church to the Soviet authorities without concurrence of numerous senior members of the Orthodox, including Metropolitan Joseph (Petrovykh), head of the Leningrad (St Petersburg) diocese, who was deposed and later executed. Nicholas was temporarily in charge of the diocese from September 1927 to February 1928. He was made Archbishop of Peterhof in 1935, and in 1936-1940 was additionally in charge of the Novgorod and Pskov dioceses.

Nicholas was one of just four bishops in the USSR who survived the Great Purge, and was so trusted by the Soviet authorities that in 1940, after the Red Army had overrun Eastern Poland, under the terms of the Pact between Stalin and Hitler, he was appointed Metropolitan of Volhynia and Lutsk and Exarch of the western regions of Ukraine and Belarus. He was elevated to the rank of Metropolitan on 9 March 1941. After the German invasion of the Soviet Union, he was appointed Metropolitan of Kiev and Galicia. Later, as the German troops advanced, he was evacuated to Moscow.

On 2 November 1942, Metropolitan Nicholas became the first Russian priest in more than 20 years to be given an official position, when he was a member of the Extraordinary State Commission for the Establishment and Investigation of the Atrocities of the German Fascist Invaders and their Accomplices. In this capacity, he took part in 'investigating' the Katyn massacre, in which thousands of Polish officers had been murdered on Stalin's orders. He went along with the commission's verdict that it was a German atrocity.

In the early hours of September 5, 1943, together with Metropolitan Sergius and Metropolitan Alexius, Nicholas had a meeting with Joseph Stalin, where the latter proposed to reestablish the Moscow Patriarchate and elect the Patriarch. On September 8, 1943, when the Moscow Patriarchate was reestablished, Nicholas became a permanent member of the Holy Synod. In 1944 he was appointed Metropolitan of Krutitsy. In 1946, when the External Church Relations Department was established within the Patriarchate, Metropolitan Nicholas became its chairman. He and the Patriarch Alexei were now the two leading personalities in the Russian Orthodox Church. According to the historian Philip Walters:

Both men were astute politicians, and both have been criticized for their alleged subservience to the demands of the State; both, however, were men of considerable spiritual integrity.

According to Christopher Andrew and Vasili Mitrokhin, both Patriarch Alexius and Metropolitan Nicholas, "were highly valued by the KGB as agents of influence."

Metropolitan Nicholas met Stalin again in April 1945. That year he visited Great Britain and France. In August, he persuaded the Orthodox churches in France to recognise the authority of the Moscow Patriarch, though they split with Moscow later. In 1950 he became a member of the World Peace Council, occupying a staunchly pro-Soviet position.

Nicholas held Joseph Stalin in high esteem, but he came into conflict with Stalin's successor Nikita Khrushchev when Communist Party policy took an anti-religious turn in 1959. He was dismissed from the position of the Chairman of the External Church Relations Department on June 21, 1960; on September 19, he was relieved of his other posts and vanished from public view. He died on December 13, 1961.
