= Josephite movement =

20th-century movement in the Russian Orthodox Church, followers of Metropolitan Joseph

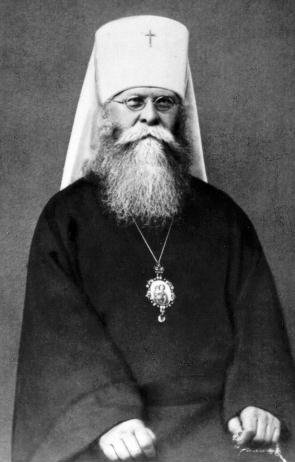
Metropolitan Joseph (Petrovykh)

Josephites (Russian: иосифляне, romanized: Iosiflyane) were a movement in Russian Orthodox Church, originated in the USSR at the end of 1927. The name is derived from the name of Metropolitan Joseph (Petrovykh) of Petrograd. The Josephites tried to create a centralized administrative structure headed by their de facto leader, Archbishop Demetrius (Lyubimov). They were part of a broader current of non-commemorators (Непоминающие) who refused to mention Patriarch Sergius of Moscow during liturgical services. The Josephites were the most numerous and united church movement among the non-commemorators. According to historians Mikhail Shkarovsky and Alexey Beglov, the number of parishes that joined Josephism reached about 2.5 thousand. Leningrad became the center of the movement, and Josephism was also widely spread in the Vyatka, Izhevsk, Novgorod, Voronezh, Tambov, Krasnodar, Kiev and Kharkov dioceses.

The resistance began after Metropolitan Sergius (Stragorodsky) issued a formal declaration to all members of the Russian Orthodox Church, in which Sergius called for loyalty toward the Soviet government: "We need to show, not in words but in deeds, that not only those who are indifferent to Orthodox Christianity, not only those who have betrayed it, but also its most zealous adherents, for whom it is dear as truth and life, with all its dogmas and traditions, with all its canonical and liturgical structure, can be faithful citizens of the Soviet Union, loyal to the Soviet government. We want to be Orthodox and at the same time recognize the Soviet Union as our civil motherland, whose joys and successes are our joys and successes and whose failures are our failures."
