= Patriarch Alexy I of Moscow =

13th Patriarch of Moscow and all Rus'

His Holiness Alexy I
- Patriarch of Moscow and all the Rus'
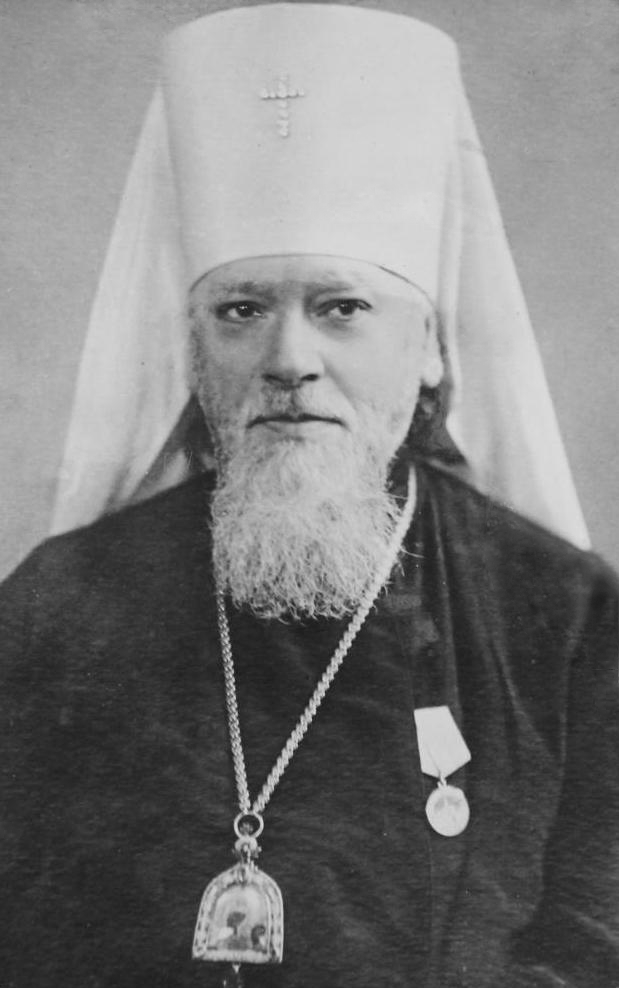
- Alexy I in 1940
- Church: Russian Orthodox Church
- See: Moscow
- Installed: 4 February 1945
- Term ended: 17 April 1970
- Predecessor: Sergius I
- Successor: Pimen I

Orders
- Ordination: 3 January 1904
- Consecration: 11 May 1913 by Gregory IV of Antioch

Personal details
- Born: Sergey Vladimirovich Simanskiy; November 8, 1877 Moscow, Russian Empire
- Died: April 17, 1970 (aged 92) Peredelkino, Moscow Oblast, RSFSR, Soviet Union
- Buried: Trinity Lavra of St. Sergius
- Denomination: Eastern Orthodoxy
- Education: Imperial Moscow University (1899); Moscow Theological Academy

Patriarch Alexy I (Alexius I, Russian: Патриарх Алексий I, secular name Sergey Vladimirovich Simansky, Russian: Серге́й Влади́мирович Сима́нский; 8 November [O.S. 27 October] 1877 – 17 April 1970) was the 13th Patriarch of Moscow and all Rus', Primate of the Russian Orthodox Church (ROC) between 1945 and 1970.

== Life ==
Born in Moscow to a noble family, his father was a Chamberlain of the Russian Imperial Court. In 1899, he graduated from Moscow Imperial University with a law degree, was conscripted by the army and served in a grenadier regiment. In 1902, he enrolled at Moscow Theological Academy, and by 1906, he had been elevated to the dignity of archimandrite and was appointed rector of the seminary at Tula.

After the Bolshevik Revolution, he was arrested several times, and in 1922, exiled to Kazakhstan. In 1926, he returned to Saint Petersburg (which had been renamed Leningrad) and was appointed Archbishop of Khutyn, that is, the vicar of the Diocese of Novgorod.

On 29 July 1927, Metropolitan Sergei Stragorodsky, acting as de facto head of the Russian Orthodox Church, signed a statement of unconditional loyalty to the Soviet State. The statement was co-signed by all members of the Holy Synod, and Archbishop Alexy of Khutyn. He ran the diocese for much of the next seven years while Metropolitan Arsenius Stadnitsky was in prison or exile. In 1933, Alexius served briefly as Archbishop of Novgorod (for several months) and then metropolitan of Leningrad.

In the early hours of 5 September 1943, Metropolitan Alexius, together with Metropolitan Sergius and Metropolitan Nicholas (Yarushevich), met with Joseph Stalin in the Kremlin where a historic decision was made regarding the fate of the Church in the state ruled by the militantly atheist Communist party. In the midst of World War II, Stalin decided to allow the Russian Orthodox Church to legally function again after two decades of severe persecution. Restrictions on the Patriarchate of Moscow were relaxed somewhat and many churches throughout the Soviet Union were re-opened. Stalin tried to appeal to patriotic feelings of the Russian people, especially the peasantry, the backbone of the Red Army, many of whom grew up in still deeply religious families.

When Patriarch Sergius died on 15 May 1944, Metropolitan Alexy took his place as Patriarchal locum tenens. In his first statement after assuming control of the Church, the Metropolitan assured Stalin of his "profound affection and gratitude" and vowed to "safeguard the Church against mistakes and false steps".

On 2 February 1945, with Stalin's approval, Alexius I was elected Patriarch of Moscow and all of Russia and enthroned on February 4, 1945.

In 1946, Alexius I presided over the controversial "re-unification" of the Ukrainian Greek Catholic Church with the ROC, seen by many as a takeover forced by the Stalinist government.

In the same year, Patriarch Alexius called on all Catholics in the Soviet Union to reject all allegiance to the Pope: "Liberate yourself! You must break the Vatican chains, which throw you into the abyss of error, darkness and spiritual decay. Hurry, return to your true mother, the Russian Orthodox Church!"

Pope Pius XII replied: "Who does not know, that Patriarch Alexius I recently elected by the dissident bishops of Russia, openly exalts and preaches defection from the Catholic Church. In a letter lately addressed to the Ruthenian Church, a letter, which contributed not a little to the persecution?"

Patriarch Alexius joined the World Peace Council, "a Soviet front organization," when it was founded in 1949. According to Christopher Andrew and Vasili Mitrokhin, both Patriarch Alexius and Metropolitan Nicholas "were highly valued by the KGB as agents of influence."

After the death of Stalin on 5 March 1953, the Patriarch composed a personal statement of condolence to the USSR's Council of Ministers. It read, "His death is a heavy grief for our Fatherland and for all the people who inhabit it. The whole Russian Orthodox Church, which will never forget his benevolent attitude to Church needs, feels great sorrow at his death. The bright memory of him will live ineradicably in our hearts. Our Church proclaims eternal memory to him with a special feeling of abiding love."

In 1955, Patriarch Alexius declared, "The Russian Orthodox Church supports the totally peaceful foreign policy of the Soviet Union, not because the Church lacks freedom, but because Soviet policy is just and corresponds to the Christian ideals which the Church preaches."

From 1959, however, the Russian Orthodox Church also had to endure a new wave of persecution, mostly carried out on the orders of the new Soviet leader Nikita Khrushchev.

Despite this, Patriarch Alexius was permitted by the KGB to enroll the Russian Orthodox Church into the Christian Peace Conference in 1958 and the World Council of Churches in 1961.

In 1965, Fathers Gleb Yakunin and Nikolai Eschlimann wrote an open letter to Patriarch Alexius. According to Evgeny Barabanov, "They showed convincingly how a significant part of the governing episcopate, with voluntary silence or cunning connivance, had assisted the Atheists to close churches, monasteries, and religious schools, to liquidate religious communities, to establish the illegal practice of registering christenings, and had yielded to them control over the assignment and transfer of priests."

The letter was published as samizdat ("self-published", i.e., underground press). In May 1966, Patriarch Alexius ordered both priests suspended from the ministry. Soviet dissident Aleksandr Solzhenitsyn sharply criticized the treatment of Fathers Gleb and Nikolai in his own open letter to Patriarch Alexius.

Patriarch Alexius died of a myocardial infarction at the age of 92 in 1970 and was buried in the Trinity Lavra of St. Sergius at Sergiyev Posad outside of Moscow.

== Legacy ==
Alexius I remains a controversial figure. Supporters praise Alexius I for working hard to ensure the survival of the Christianity in Russia, advocating peace and inter-church unity.

The Patriarch was an amazing man. Until his last days, he retained the clear shine of his eyes and the firmness of his handwriting. In worship—and in life—he was inimitable; it was impossible to repeat him. An interesting detail: in the service, he was immediately visible, optically the eye focused on him, although he was ... of incomplete average height. With the beginning of contacts with foreign Churches, Patriarchs from the East began to come to us, majestic, who did not know what repression was, but when they stood in the same row, our Patriarch stood out among them for his spiritual greatness. This inner content set him apart from all the hierarchs ... The Patriarch's character was very contrasting—I would say fiery. When he was angry, he flared up, became terribly angry, but then he always got very upset about it and regretted what had happened. Besides, he had a great sense of humor.

— Metropolitan Pitirim Nechaev, Alexy I's subdeacon

He was a sufferer, who served God in the most turbulent and difficult time for both the Church and the Fatherland. And he survived that time. We believe that the Lord helps such workers of the field of Christ. And along with the memory of them, the Lord bless us all with unforgettable blessings. His Holiness the Patriarch shows a sign of true Christian love. The one whom God encourages always has love in his heart.

— Metropolitan Eulogius Smirnov, another subdeacon of Alexy I

However, his opponents often accused him of complicity with the Soviet authorities. A leading critic of Patriarch Alexei's leadership was Father Gleb Yakunin who claimed in his books and articles that the postwar hierarchy of the Russian Orthodox Church was controlled by KGB informants.

== Bibliography ==
- Imperial Moscow University: 1755-1917: encyclopedic dictionary. Moscow: Russian political encyclopedia (ROSSPEN). 2010. p. 21. ISBN 978-5-8243-1429-8 – via A. Andreev, D. Tsygankov.

Eastern Orthodox Church titles
Preceded by Sergius I	Patriarch of Moscow; 1945–1970	Succeeded by Pimen I
