= Lux in Tenebris =

Biblical Latin phrase

Lux in tenebris is a Latin phrase from the Vulgate Bible which means, "light in darkness". The phrase is part of the fifth verse of the Gospel of John, which was translated from the original Greek as follows:

... et lux in tenebris lucet, et tenebrae eam non comprehenderunt. —John 1:5 (VUL)
and the light shineth in darkness; and the darkness comprehended it not. —John 1:5 (KJV)

This verse is part of the longer prologue to John's gospel, in which the author evokes the imagery of light in reference to Jesus, the second person of the Trinity. Jesus is understood to be the light of God, who is sent by the Father to illumine the world out of sin and darkness.

This phrase, in the more complete form lux in tenebris lucet, is the motto of Columbia University School of General Studies, and was also the national motto for the former British colonial protectorate of Nyasaland (now Malawi). The motto of Kenya's leading private hospital, The Nairobi Hospital remains lux in tenebris.

It is also the title of a short one-act farce, written in prose, by the German dramatist Bertolt Brecht. It is thought that he wrote it in 1919, under the influence of, "that great Munich clown Karl Valentin".
