= Spaso-Yakovlevsky Monastery =

Eastern Orthodox monastery

Coordinates: 57.173°N 39.390°E

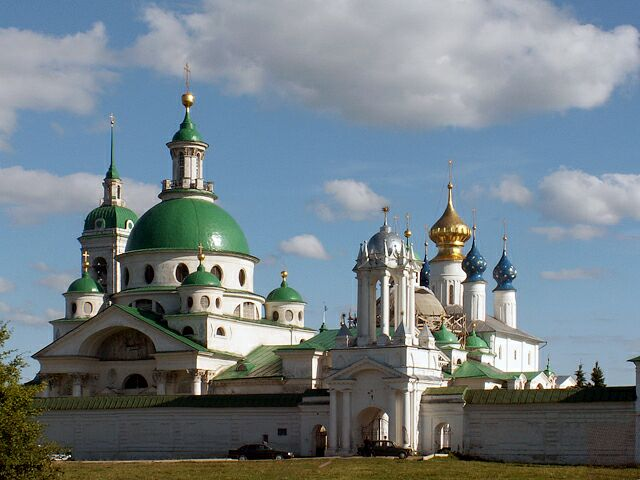
Monastery of St. Jacob Saviour

Monastery of St. Jacob Saviour (Russian: Спасо-Яковлевский монастырь, romanized: Spaso-Yakovlevsky) is an Eastern Orthodox monastery situated to the left from the Rostov kremlin on the Rostov's outskirts.

The monastery was founded in 1389 by St Iakov of Rostov, who was banished from his town for sparing a woman sentenced to death. Iakov moved south from Rostov and settled near the church of Archangel Michael, built in the 11th century by St Leontiy of Rostov.

From the 14th up to the late 17th century all the buildings in the monastery were made of wood. The earliest kept building is Cathedral of Conception of St Anna (Zachatievsky Cathedral). It has been constructed in 1686. Another 17th-century building is Savior Transfiguration Cathedral (Spaso-Preobrazhensky Cathedral) which once belonged to the abolished Spaso-Pesotsky Monastery.

The Spaso-Yakovlevsky Monastery has been greatly venerated as the shrine of St Dmitry of Rostov. He arrived at Rostov on the 1 of March, 1702, following orders of Peter the Great. Upon his death in 1709 two valuable icons of Holy Mother were moved into the Troitsky Cathedral. Most of the monastery structures were built in the late 18th and early 19th centuries in the fine neoclassical style. The Cathedral of St Dmitry of Rostov was constructed in 1794–1802 with support of Nikolai Sheremetev's column.
