= Arsenius Stadnitsky =

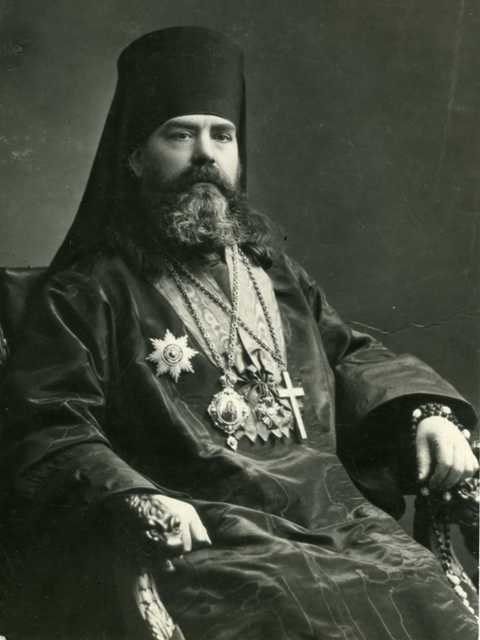

Metropolitan Arsenius (Russian: Митрополит Арсений, secular name Avksenty Georgievich Stadnitsky; 3 February 1862, Komarovo, Bessarabia – 10 February 1936, Tashkent) was a Soviet Eastern Orthodox prelate who helped lead the church in the late Imperial and early Soviet periods. He was a member of the Holy Governing Synod from 1906 and a candidate for Patriarch of All Rus' in 1917.

He was Bishop of Pskov from 1903 to 1910, Archbishop of Novgorod from 1910 to 1917, when that office was elevated to a metropolitanate. He continued as Metropolitan of Novgorod until 1933, when he was named Metropolitan of Tashkent and Turkestan (he was exiled to Central Asia by the Soviet authorities at that time). He died in Tashkent on 10 February 1936.
