= Patriarch Sergius of Moscow =

Head of the Russian Orthodox Church (1867–1944)

Sergius I
- Patriarch of Moscow and all the Rus'
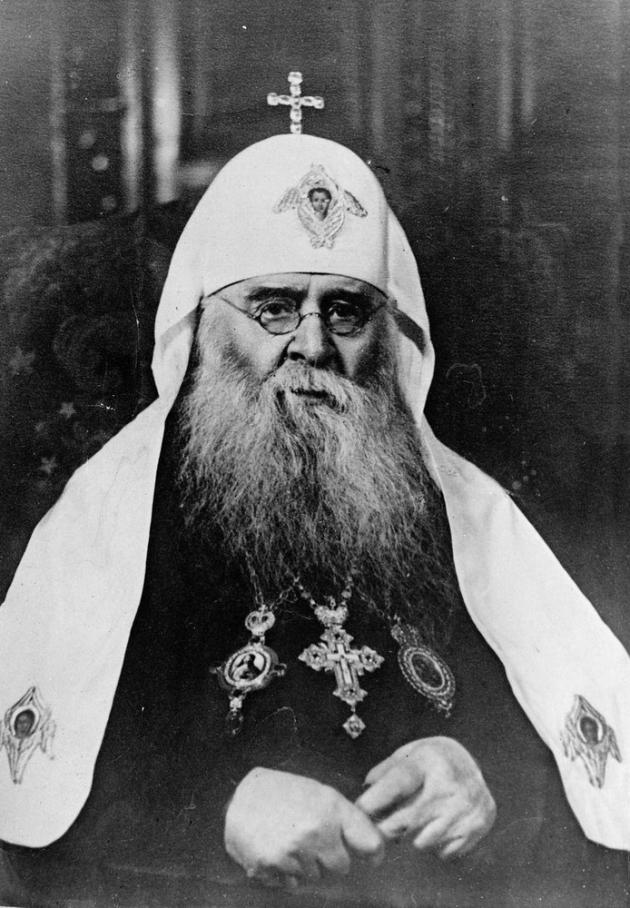
- Sergius in 1943
- Church: Russian Orthodox Church
- See: Moscow
- Installed: 8 September 1943
- Term ended: 15 May 1944
- Predecessor: St. Tikhon
- Successor: Alexy I

Personal details
- Born: Ivan Nikolayevich Stragorodsky; January 23, 1867 Arzamas, Nizhny Novgorod Governorate, Russian Empire
- Died: May 15, 1944 (aged 77) Moscow, Soviet Union
- Denomination: Eastern Orthodox Church

Patriarch Sergius I (Russian: Патриа́рх Се́ргий; born Ivan Nikolayevich Stragorodsky, Ива́н Никола́евич Страгоро́дский; 23 January [O.S. 11 January] 1867 – May 15, 1944) was the 12th Patriarch of Moscow and all the Rus', from September 8, 1943 until his death on May 15, 1944. He was also the de facto head of the Russian Orthodox Church in 1925–1943, firstly as deputy Patriarchal locum tenens (1925–1937) subsequently as Patriarchal locum tenens (1937–1943).

Starting in 1927, he pursued a policy of unconditional loyalty to the Soviet government, which led to significant criticism of him and the separation of some lay people and clerics.

== Early life ==
Ivan Nikolayevich Stragorodsky was born on January 11, 1867, in the town of Arzamas, Nizhny Novgorod Governorate, in to the deeply religious family of an archpriest, Nikolai Stragorodsky. On January 30, 1890, he was tonsured a monk and given the name Sergius. He studied at the Nizhny Novgorod Theological Seminary, from which he graduated in 1886, and later at the Saint Petersburg Theological Academy, graduating in 1890. That same year, Sergius was sent with the Russian Orthodox spiritual mission to Japan, where he became a professor of Dogmatic Theology in Tokyo and fluent in Japanese; he already knew Greek, Latin, and Hebrew from his theological studies. After returning home from Japan, he was appointed Inspector of the Saint Petersburg Theological Academy on October 6, 1899, and became its rector on January 21, 1901.

On February 25, 1901, Sergius was consecrated Bishop of Jamburg, the vicar of the Diocese of St. Petersburg. On October 6, 1905, he was appointed Archbishop of Vyborg and All Finland. As a prominent hierarch in the capital, he was one of the first church officials whom Grigori Rasputin contacted after arriving in St. Petersburg.

On May 6, 1911, he became a member of the Most Holy Synod. He was transferred to the see of Vladimir and Shuya on August 10, 1917, and on November 28 of the same year, Patriarch Tikhon elevated him to the rank of Metropolitan of Vladimir. In January 1921, the Bolsheviks arrested Metropolitan Sergius; after several months in Moscow's Butyrka prison, he was exiled from Moscow to Nizhny Novgorod.

From June 16, 1922, to August 27, 1923, Sergius participated in the Renovationist schism by signing a memorandum that recognized the authority of the schismatic "Living Church." He later publicly repented of his actions, and on August 27, 1923, he was formally forgiven and received back into communion by Patriarch Tikhon. He was appointed the Metropolitan of Nizhny Novgorod by Patriarch Tikhon on March 18, 1924.

== Acting locum tenens ==
Facing intense persecution from the Soviet government that made convening a proper Local Council (Поместный Собор) for an election impossible, Patriarch Tikhon took the extraordinary measure of creating a secret will to ensure a line of succession. In this testament, he named three bishops in a specific order of priority to lead the Church after his death.

Following Tikhon's death, the first two candidates on his list, Metropolitan Kirill of Kazan and Metropolitan Agathangel of Yaroslavl, were already in prison or exile. Consequently, on April 12, 1925, the third candidate, Metropolitan Peter of Krutitsy, was formally affirmed as the Patriarchal Locum Tenens (Местоблюститель Патриаршего Престола, or "Guardian of the Patriarchal Throne") by the 58 bishops who had gathered for Tikhon's funeral.

However, Peter's leadership in freedom was short-lived. After refusing to compromise with the state, he was arrested by the OGPU just eight months later, on December 10, 1925. Foreseeing his imminent arrest, Peter had followed Tikhon's example and prepared his own testament, naming a new list of successors.

After Peter's arrest, the first candidate on his list, Metropolitan Sergius of Nizhny Novgorod, was the only one not already in prison or exile. He assumed leadership of the Church, but with the carefully chosen title of Deputy Patriarchal Locum Tenens (Заместитель Патриаршего Местоблюстителя). This title explicitly signified that Peter remained the de jure head of the Church and that Sergius was merely acting as his substitute. It was hoped that Peter would return to his duties upon his release, though he was ultimately executed in 1937.

Sergius himself was arrested and imprisoned from November 30, 1926, to March 27, 1927. During his incarceration, the chain of succession continued, with other bishops temporarily taking on the role of Deputy Locum Tenens according to the established wills.

== Declaration of loyalty toward the USSR ==
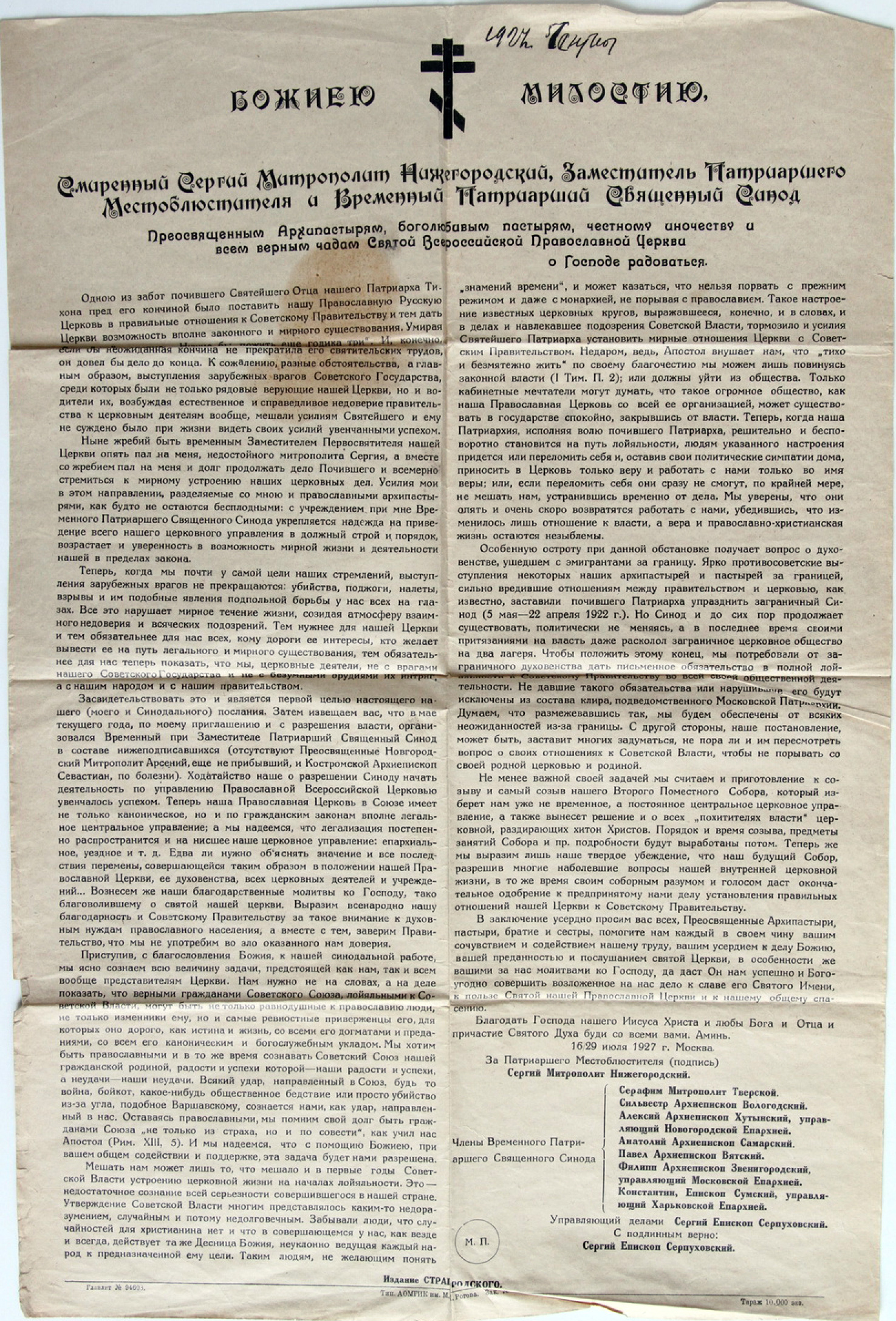
A Leaflet with text of the Declaration

Seeking to save the institutional Church from annihilation, Sergius, acting as the deputy patriarchal locum tenens, sought ways to reconcile with the Soviet government. He engaged with the OGPU to secure a legal existence for the Church. To this end, he formed the Provisional Patriarchal Holy Synod, so named because the legitimate locum tenens, Metropolitan Peter of Krutitsy, was still alive in prison. This Synod received official recognition from the OGPU, allowing it to function legally.

On July 29, 1927, together with members of the Synod, Sergius issued his famous and controversial declaration: an encyclical letter professing the absolute loyalty of the Russian Orthodox Church to the Soviet Union and its government's interests. In it, he stated:

We need to show, not in words but in deeds, that not only those who are indifferent to Orthodox Christianity, not only those who have betrayed it, but also its most zealous adherents, for whom it is dear as truth and life, with all its dogmas and traditions, with all its canonical and liturgical structure, can be faithful citizens of the Soviet Union, loyal to the Soviet government. We want to be Orthodox and at the same time recognize the Soviet Union as our civil motherland, whose joys and successes are our joys and successes and whose failures are our failures. Any blow directed at the Union, be it a war, a boycott, some kind of social disaster, or just a murder from around the corner, like the Warsaw one, is recognized by us as a blow directed at us.

— Epistle to Pastors and their Flocks, 1927

This declaration sparked an immediate schism within Russian Orthodoxy. Many believers, including numerous respected bishops in prisons and exile, broke communion with Sergius. This opposition movement became known as the "Josephites," after one of its leaders, Metropolitan Joseph of Petrograd. The policy of submission to the Soviet state is commonly called "Sergianism," a derogatory term coined by its opponents to denote a betrayal of the Church's principles.

In 1934, Sergius assumed the more elevated title of "His Beatitude, Metropolitan of Moscow and Kolomna." Then, in 1936, following a false, state-sponsored report of Metropolitan Peter's death, Sergius dropped "Deputy" from his title and assumed the full position of patriarchal locum tenens, even though Peter was, in fact, still alive.

Despite Sergius's pledge of loyalty, his declaration failed to stop the state's persecution. The arrests and executions of clergy and the destruction of churches intensified, reaching a peak during the Great Purge of 1937–1938. Before the 1941 invasion by Nazi Germany, only four ruling bishops remained active and out of prison in the entire USSR. Likewise, of the approximately 50,000 Russian Orthodox priests active in 1918, only about 500 remained by 1935.

Patriarchal locum tenens Peter of Krutitsy was executed by firing squad in 1937.

Only after the German invasion of the Soviet Union in 1941 did Joseph Stalin scale back the anti-religious campaign, needing the moral and patriotic support of the Church for the war effort. In the early hours of September 5, 1943, Stalin met with the three chief hierarchs of the Church, Sergius, Alexy (Simansky), and Nikolai (Yarushevich), and promised concessions in exchange for their loyalty. Among the concessions were the opening of theological schools, the limited release of imprisoned clerics, and the return of some church property, including the Trinity Lavra of St. Sergius. Most importantly, he granted permission for the Church to convene a council and elect a new Patriarch.

In return, the Soviet government formalized its control over the Church. A new state body, the Council for the Affairs of the Russian Orthodox Church (CAROC), was created to oversee it. Headed by a general from the NKGB, the council ensured that the Church would operate under the strict supervision of the state's security services.

== Election to the Patriarchate and death ==
On September 8, 1943, a bishops’ council of the Russian Orthodox Church met at the Patriarchal Residence in Moscow and unanimously elected Metropolitan Sergius (Stragorodsky), the Patriarchal Locum Tenens, to the restored office of Patriarch of Moscow and all Rus’.

Four days later, on September 12, he was formally enthroned at Moscow's Epiphany Cathedral at Yelokhovo as the Patriarch of Moscow and all Rus'. At the time of his installation, Patriarch Sergius was 76 years old and in frail health. His tenure lasted only eight months; he died from a cerebral hemorrhage in Moscow on May 15, 1944.

Eastern Orthodox Church titles
Preceded by Tikhon	Patriarch of Moscow; 1943–1944	Succeeded by Alexy I
Awards and achievements
Preceded by Greer Garson	Cover of Time Magazine; 27 December 1943	Succeeded by George Marshall
