= Political parties of Russia in 1917 =

The political parties of Russia in 1917 were the aggregate of the main political parties and organizations that existed in Russia in 1917. Immediately after the February Revolution, the defeat of the right–wing monarchist parties and political groups takes place, the struggle between the socialist parties (Socialist Revolutionaries, Mensheviks, Bolsheviks) and liberals (Constitutional Democrats) on the one hand, and the struggle between moderate socialists (Mensheviks, right–wing Socialist Revolutionaries, centrist Socialist Revolutionaries) and radicals (Bolsheviks, left–wing Socialist Revolutionaries, anarchists).

== Synopsis ==
The February revolution sharply intensifies political life in Russia, many parties, party factions and associations are formed, the total number of which reaches 50 by November 1917. A number of small factions appeared that did not play a significant role in the events: the Menshevik Internationalists (Left Mensheviks), the Socialist Revolutionary Maximalists, the Russian Socialist Workers' Party of Internationalists, the Social Democratic faction "Unity" headed by Plekhanov and others. Of the significant changes in the party system in 1917, the following occurred:

- The final elimination of the right–wing monarchist parties from political life; by the fall of 1917, the liberal Constitutional Democratic Party became the most "rightist", gravitating towards the idea of a constitutional monarchy on the British model;
- The split of the Russian Social Democratic Labor Party into Menshevik and Bolshevik factions by November 1917 becomes final due to sharp ideological contradictions;
- The Social Democratic faction of the "Interdistrictites", which insisted on overcoming this split, became part of the Bolsheviks in August 1917;
- By the fall of 1917, there was a split in the Socialist Revolutionary Party into Left, Center and Right.

== Defeat of the right–wing monarchist movements ==
Right–wing parties were persecuted almost immediately after the February Revolution. Already on March 5, 1917, the executive committee of the Petrograd Soviet prohibits the publication of Black Hundred newspapers, including Russkoe Znamya and Novoye Vremya. Also on March 5, the Provisional Government establishes an Extraordinary Commission of Inquiry, before which, in addition to the highest tsarist officials and generals, also the leaders of the right–wing parties appeared.

The main Black Hundred organization, the Union of the Russian People, was already in a protracted crisis from 1907 to 1910, splitting into several parts. After the February Revolution, the organization curtailed its activities, disbanding its departments and destroying its archives. One of the leaders of the organization, Alexander Dubrovin, was arrested during the revolution. According to some sources, the Main Council of the organization in Petrograd was defeated during the events.

The organizations "Russian People's Union Named After Mikhail Archangel" and "Russian Assembly" also ceased their activities. The oldest Black Hundred organization, the Union of Russian People, actually ceased its activity in 1910–1911. The Russian Monarchist Party was banned, its leader Keltsev was placed under house arrest for several months.

The estate noble organization "United Nobility", which back in January 1917 declared about the "inviolability of the foundations of autocracy and readiness to serve it with faith and truth", after the February Revolution, sharply changed its rhetoric. The Permanent Council of the organization sends telegrams to the localities calling for "quiet work and the maintenance of order", on March 9, 1917, adopts a resolution: "The nobility must direct all forces to promote the now unified legitimate government". Similar resolutions are adopted by the meetings of the leaders and deputies of the nobility of the Samara Province on March 5, the Moscow Province on March 13.

However, the further political activity of the noble organizations is already beginning to provoke a strong rejection of the new government. Particularly strong hostility was caused by the attempts of the nobles to infiltrate various committees in the villages, which aroused the hostility of the communal peasants. In August 1917, the Ministry of Finance made a request to the Ministry of Justice to terminate the activities of noble estate institutions due to the inability to finance them. In September, the Ministry of Justice announced the alleged abolition of all estates in general, and the nobility in particular, the provincial leaders of the nobility were asked to "submit the files to the archives in advance".

Even a number of grand dukes recognize the provisional government. On March 9, 11 and 12, telegrams from the Grand Dukes Nikolai Nikolaevich, Alexander Mikhailovich, Boris Vladimirovich, Sergei Mikhailovich, Georgy Mikhailovich and Prince Alexander of Oldenburg arrive in the name of the Prime Minister Prince Lvov.

The Holy Governing Synod to the Faithful Children of the Russian Orthodox Church.
Grace to you and peace be multiplied (2 Peter 1:2).
The will of God has come true. Russia has embarked on the path of a new state life. May God bless our great Motherland with happiness and glory on its new path.
Beloved children of the holy Orthodox Church!
The Provisional Government came into control of the country at a difficult historical moment. The enemy still stands on our land, and great efforts are in store for our glorious army in the near future. At such a time, all the faithful sons of the Motherland should be imbued with common inspiration.
For the sake of millions of better lives, laid down on the battlefield, for the sake of countless funds spent by Russia on protection from the enemy, for the many sacrifices made to win civil liberty, for the sake of saving your own families, for the happiness of the Motherland, leave any strife in this great historical time and disagreement, unite in brotherly love for the good of the Motherland, trust the Provisional Government; all together and each separately, make every effort to make it easier for him by labor and deeds, prayer and obedience, the great task of establishing new principles of state life and by common reason to lead Russia on the path of true freedom, happiness and glory.
The Holy Synod fervently prays to the All–Merciful Lord, may He bless the labors and undertakings of the Provisional Government, may give it strength, strength and wisdom, and may guide the sons of the great Russian state subordinate to it on the path of brotherly love, glorious defense of the Motherland from the enemy and a serene peaceful order.

Humble Vladimir, Metropolitan of Kiev
Humble Macarius, Metropolitan of Moscow
Humble Sergius, Archbishop of Finland
Humble Tikhon, Archbishop of Lithuania
Humble Arseny, Archbishop of Novgorod
Humble Michael, Archbishop of Grodno
Humble Joachim, Archbishop of Nizhny Novgorod
Humble Vasily, Archbishop of Chernigov
Protopresbyter Alexander Dernov

— Proclamation of the Most Holy Governing Synod on March 9, 1917 "To the Faithful Children of the Russian Orthodox Church on the Occasion of the Current Events"

The reaction of the Russian Orthodox Church to the revolution was complex. The last years of the monarchy's existence turned the highest hierarchs of the Church negatively towards the personality of Grigory Rasputin. Bishop of Tauride and Simferopol Theophan and Metropolitan of Saint Petersburg and Ladoga Anthony speak negatively about Rasputin. Schiarchimandrite Gavriil (Zyryanov), the elder of the Seven Desert, even spoke about Rasputin like this: "Kill him like a spider – forty sins will be forgiven".

Rasputin, starting in 1912, actively intervened in the activities of the Holy Synod and in the process of appointing bishops, in particular, removing his former supporter, Bishop Hermogenes of Saratov and Tsaritsyno (according to some sources, the conflict even reached a fight) and, conversely, bringing Metropolitan Macarius of Moscow, Metropolitan of Petrograd and Ladoga Pitirim, Archbishop of Tobolsk and Siberia Varnava closer. After the resignation in 1915 of the Chief Prosecutor of the Synod, Vladimir Sabler, the new chief prosecutor, Alexander Samarin, also soon resigned due to a conflict with Rasputin.

Metropolitan Pitirim, having a reputation as a "Rrasputinets", was arrested during the February Revolution and deprived of his see, Metropolitans Macarius and Varnava were dismissed by the Synod's decree.

On March 7, 1917, changes were made to the text of the state oath for persons of Christian confessions; the oath included a commitment to "serve the Provisional Government". On March 9, the reference to the king was removed from the traditional formula "For Faith, King and Fatherland".

On March 9, the Synod issued a message "To the Faithful Children of the Orthodox Russian Church on the Current Events", which also recognized the Provisional Government. General Anton Denikin, in his memoirs, described this message as "sanctioning the coup d'etat". In general, the Church comes to the point of view that since Nicholas II abdicated the throne, and Grand Duke Mikhail Alexandrovich recognized the Provisional Government, then the Church should also recognize it. On the tenth of March, the clergy of the Russian Orthodox Church themselves took an oath of allegiance to the Provisional Government and subsequently took part in the same oath of allegiance to the ranks of the army and navy.

On March 11, 1917, the clergy of the Russian Orthodox Church established a form of oath for members of the Provisional Government, who were sworn in on March 15. The formula of the solemn promise included the oath "... before Almighty God and my conscience to serve the people of the Russian State with faith and righteousness ... with all the measures provided to me to suppress any attempts, directly or indirectly aimed at restoring the old order ... to take all measures to convene as soon as possible ... of the Constituent Assembly, to transfer to its hands the fullness of power".

However, on the other hand, such a "swearing–in" confused both part of the flock and a certain part of the clergy, who viewed the situation in the country as an "interregnum". Researcher Mikhail Babkin cites, as a characteristic, a letter to the Holy Synod of a group of persons who signed themselves as "Orthodox Christians" and asked to explain to them "what to do with the old oath and with the one that will be forced to take? What kind of oath should be dearer to God, the first, al the second?". On the whole, the position of the Church to some extent knocked the ground out from under the feet of the monarchist movements, depriving them of ideological support.

On April 27, 1917, the Provisional Government dissolves the old structure of the Synod, seeking to cleanse it of the "Rasputinists". Only Archbishop Sergiy of Finland and Vyborg remained from the old staff. The Church sees in the fall of the monarchy a reason to move from the synodal system to the patriarchal one. In April, the Russian Orthodox Church began to prepare for the Local Council, which began its work in August 1917; in August, the post of Chief Prosecutor of the Synod was abolished. In February 1918, the synodal structure was finally liquidated. In general, contemporaries perceived the Local Council as a church analogue of the Constituent Assembly.

For the first time, the Church raised the question of convening a Local Council during the 1905 revolution. Nicholas II agreed to the convocation of the council and authorized the formation of the Pre–Council Presence, which operated in January – December 1906. However, in 1907 the decision to convene the council was "postponed". In 1912, the Synod again convened the Pre–Council Meeting, but the Tsar did not authorize the convocation of the council.

== Socialist Revolutionary Party in 1917 ==
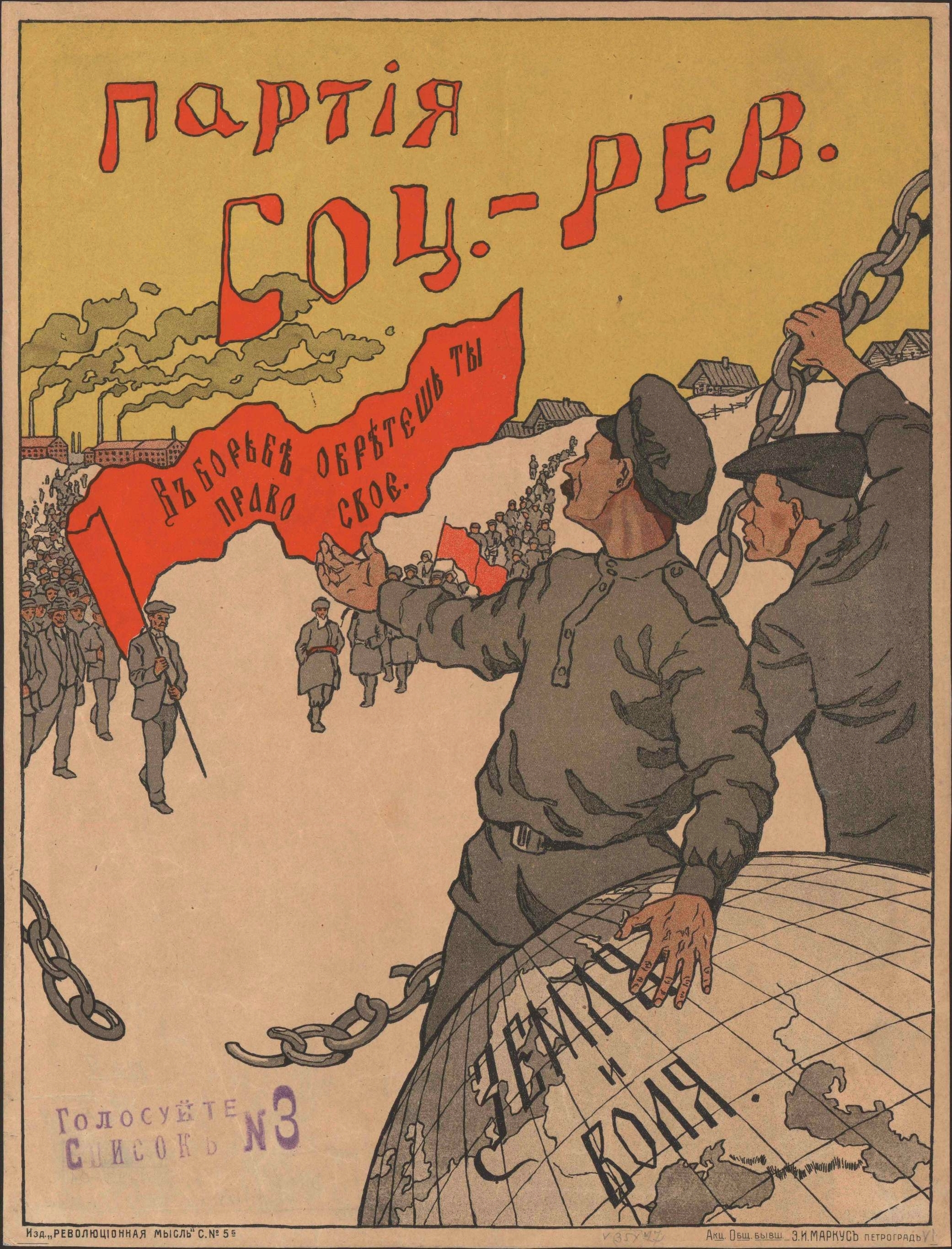
Election poster of the Socialist Revolutionary Party, 1917

In the spring of 1917, the most influential socialist party was the Socialist Revolutionaries, who until 1917 were engaged in active terrorist activities against the autocracy. This party adhered to the theory of "peasant socialism", which believed that in Russia, as in an agrarian country, "socialism" should grow primarily from the village with its communal traditions. The Socialist Revolutionary slogan "socialization of agriculture" corresponded to the aspirations of the bulk of the peasantry, awaiting a "black redistribution" of the landlord's land.

In the period 1909–1916, the Socialist Revolutionary Party fell into decay as a result of its defeat by the tsarist police. One of the most powerful blows to the party was the activities of the police provocateur Azef, exposed in 1908, who was even able to become the leader of the Socialist Revolutionary Fighting Organization and one of the organizers of such a high–profile terrorist attack as the elimination of Grand Duke Sergey Alexandrovich. However, the February Revolution turns the Socialist Revolutionaries into one of the main political parties in the country. The Socialist Revolutionary newspaper Delo Naroda has a circulation of 300,000 copies. In total, in 1917, up to a hundred Socialist Revolutionary publications were published.

By the beginning of the summer of 1917, the number of Socialist Revolutionaries reached 800 thousand people, by the end – up to 1 million people. 436 local organizations are being formed, located in 62 provinces, as well as on the fronts and fleets. However, in the entire history of the party, only four of its congresses were held; in 1917, the party did not adopt a permanent charter; since 1906, the Temporary Organizational Charter, as amended, continues to operate. In 1909, the party decided to introduce a mandatory payment of membership fees, but this decision never became generally accepted.

The rapid growth of the party, combined with its loose structure, leads to a strong confusion in the social composition and political convictions. The Socialist Revolutionary Party is sometimes joined by whole villages, regiments and factories by people of very different positions, often having a poor idea of the party itself and of its ideology. By the summer of 1917, the leadership of the Socialist Revolutionary Party began to observe the massive entry of careerists into the party that had become influential in February 1917 and expressed doubts about the quality of the "March" Socialist Revolutionaries. After the Bolsheviks came to power on October 25, 1917, the "March" Socialist Revolutionaries, who joined the party for careerist goals, unexpectedly find themselves in opposition. An avalanche–like exodus from this party begins, which ends in early 1918.

By the fall of 1917, the Socialist Revolutionaries had actually split into three parties (left, centrists, and right), which formed parallel party structures. Right–wing Socialist Revolutionaries (Alexander Kerensky, Boris Savinkov, Nikolay Avksentyev, Ekaterina Breshko–Breshkovskaya), close in views to the "Trudoviks", became a moderate trend. They considered Lenin's slogan of a socialist revolution premature, and took a broad part in the activities of the Provisional Government. Of the centrist Socialist Revolutionaries who dominated the party until its collapse, one can single out Semyon Maslov and the main Socialist Revolutionary ideologist Viktor Chernov.

At the same time, a radical trend also stands out in the party (Maria Spiridonova, Boris Kamkov, Yuri Sablin). At the 3rd Congress of the Socialist Revolutionary Party in late May – early June 1917, the left wing forms its own faction and accuses the Central Committee of "shifting the center of the party's support to strata of the population that, due to their class character or level of consciousness, cannot be a real support for the policy of true revolutionary socialism", demands the transfer of land to the peasants, the transfer of power to the Soviets, the refusal to prepare the June 1917 offensive. The Central Committee forbids them from speaking on behalf of the party criticizing the decisions of its 3rd Congress. By September, left–wing Socialist Revolutionaries begin to dominate the party organizations of Petrograd, Helsingfors and Voronezh, and in the Petrograd organization they make up up to 40 thousand people out of 45 thousand. In October 1917, the separation of the left–wing Socialist Revolutionaries into a separate party was finally formalized after sharp conflicts with the centrist Central Committee: the left–wing Socialist Revolutionaries supported the Bolsheviks in the Pre–Parliament, at the Northern Regional Congress of Soviets, included in the Revolutionary Military Committee of the Petrograd Soviet that actually led the uprising, supported Bolsheviks at the historic 2nd All–Russian Congress of Soviets of Workers' and Soldiers' Deputies.

The split of the Socialist Revolutionaries becomes irreversible after the October armed uprising in Petrograd on October 25, 1917: on October 29, the Central Committee of Socialist Revolutionaries expels its left wing from the party, on October 30 it dissolves the Petrograd, Helsingfors and Voronezh party organizations. In response, the left–wing Socialist Revolutionaries immediately began to form their own party structures, calling for November 17 a congress separate from the centrists.

== Mensheviks in 1917 ==
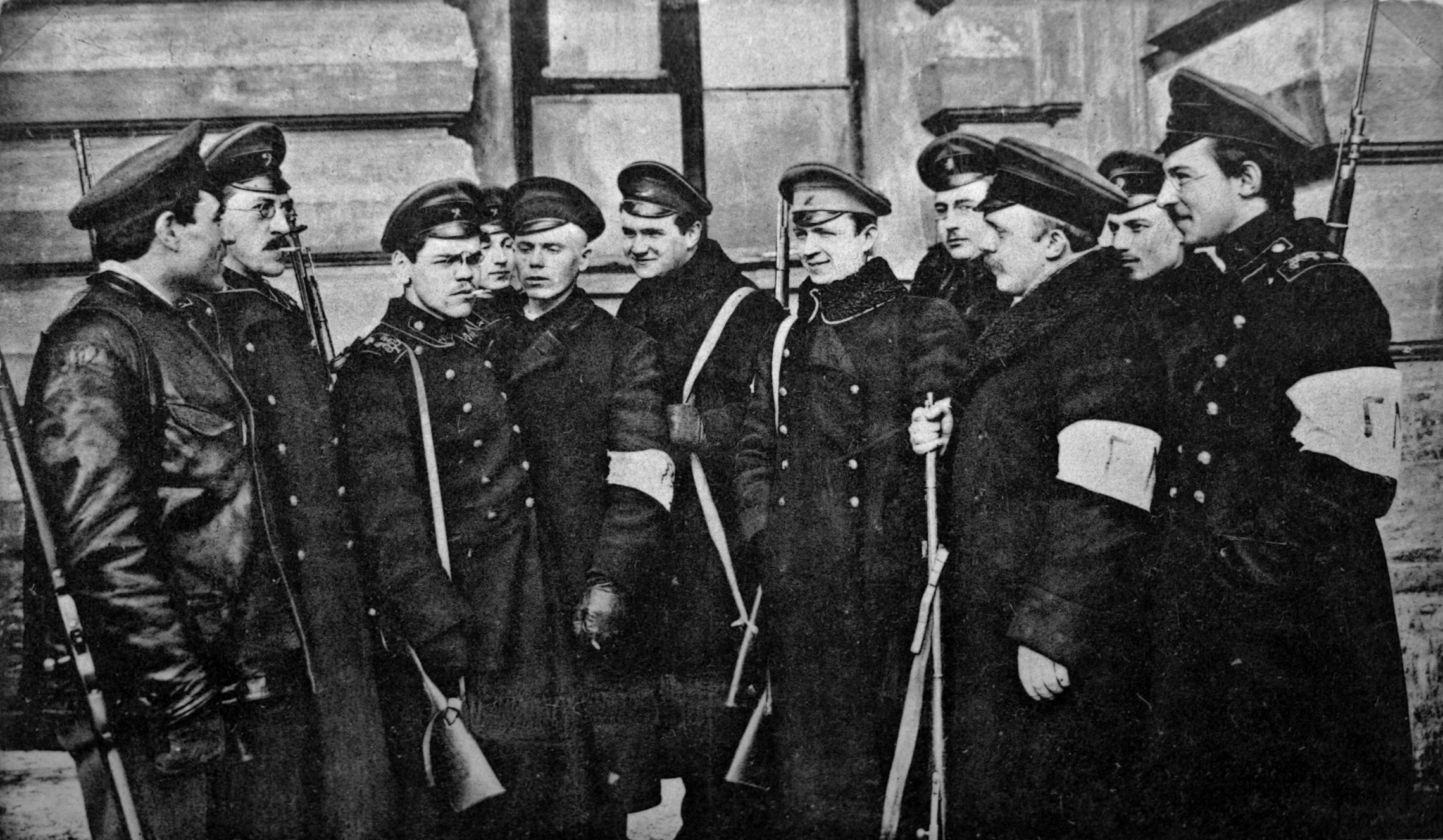
Students, members of the people's militia. March 1917

The Mensheviks were supporters of Marxism and the socialist revolution, however, they rejected the view of Lenin and Trotsky on the bourgeois democratic revolution in Russia as a possible prologue to the revolution in Germany and beyond the socialist world. The disadvantages of the Mensheviks in the political competition were indecision and an amorphous organizational structure; the Bolsheviks opposed it with a rigid, centralized organization headed by a charismatic leader.

The foundations for the split of the Social Democrats into Bolshevik and Menshevik factions were laid back at the Second Congress of the Russian Social Democratic Labor Party of 1903 due to different formulations about the organization of the party: the Bolsheviks, led by Lenin, demanded from the party members "personal participation", and the Mensheviks – "personal assistance". The difference in wording indicated different approaches to party building: if Lenin's followers insisted on the formation of a rigid centralized organization, an organization of "professional revolutionaries", then the Mensheviks – on free association.

The fierce factional struggle within the framework of the still unified Russian Social Democratic Labor Party stretched out for many years. In 1905, the Bolsheviks and Mensheviks held parallel congresses, the Bolsheviks in London and the Mensheviks in Geneva. At the 4th Congress of the Russian Social Democratic Labour Party (1906) in Stockholm, the Bolsheviks, despite their name, were in the minority. In 1912, parallel party conferences were held: the Bolshevik in January in Prague, and the Menshevik in Vienna in August, and both sides considered their conferences to be general party. The Menshevik August Bloc of 1912 in Vienna demonstrated that the party was already a motley mosaic of warring factions.

In August 1917, the Mensheviks convened the so–called Unification Congress of the Russian Social Democratic Labor Party, at which they decided to rename their party to the Russian Social Democratic Labor Party (United). In fact, the reunification of the Bolsheviks and Mensheviks into a single party did not happen; instead, the Mensheviks themselves split into four factions, "extreme defencists", "revolutionary defencists", Internationalists–Martovites and Novaya Zhizn Internationalists (from the name of the newspaper Novaya Zhizn). The last faction in September 1917 emerged as an independent party, the Russian Social Democratic Labor Party (Internationalists). In addition, the Unity faction, led by Plekhanov, split off.

The main reason for the internal Menshevik splits was the question of peace, which divided the party into "defencists" who defended the idea of the so–called "revolutionary defencism" ("war to a victorious end"), and "internationalists" who leaned towards the position of the Bolsheviks.

The political platforms of the "Menshevik Internationalists" ("Martovites") and "non–factional United Social Democrats" ("Novozhiznets", the Russian Social Democratic Labor Party (Internationalists)) were close to the Bolshevik platform. Both factions (parties) were represented in the post–October composition of the All–Russian Central Executive Committee, albeit by a small minority. The Russian Social Democratic Labor Party (Internationalists), although it did not accept the October Revolution, began to draw closer to the Bolsheviks in 1918 and, after negotiations stretched out for several years, in 1920 finally became part of the Russian Communist Party (Bolsheviks).

In general, all the Menshevik factions, both "left" and "right", refused to support the October armed uprising in Petrograd, to characterize it as the establishment of a "Bolshevik dictatorship" by means of a "military conspiracy". The Mensheviks defiantly boycotted the Second Congress of Soviets of Workers' and Soldiers' Deputies and refused to take part in the formation of a new government.

The Constituent Assembly election result confirmed the marginalization of the Mensheviks, obtaining a little over a million votes. Nearly half of the Menshevik vote came from Georgia. The Mensheviks were the most voted party in the Transcaucasus and the Chinese Eastern Railway electoral districts. In about 20% of the constituencies, pro-war Mensheviks and Internationalists ran on competing slates and in Petrograd and Kharkov the defencists had set up their own local organizations.

== Bolsheviks ==
=== Early 1917 ===
The February Revolution of 1917 catches the Bolshevik Party by surprise. As researchers Richard Pipes and Mikhail Voslensky point out, Lenin back in January 1917, in exile, speaking to young Swiss socialists, declared: "We, the elderly, may not live to see the decisive battles of this coming revolution. But I can, I think, express with great confidence the hope that the youth ... will have the happiness not only to fight, but also to win in the coming proletarian revolution". Alexander Shlyapnikov, head of the Russian Bureau of the Central Committee of the Russian Social Democratic Labor Party (Bolsheviks), who was directly in Petrograd before the revolution, noted that "all political groups and organizations of the underground were against the protest in the coming months of 1917".

The leader of the constitutional democrats, Pavel Milyukov, expressed the same spirit when he noted that "January and February [before the revolution] of 1917 passed somehow colorlessly". The Socialist Revolutionary militant Sergey Mstislavsky noted that the revolution found the revolutionaries asleep, "like the evangelical foolish virgins". In the words of Vasily Shulgin, "the revolutionaries are not ready yet, but the revolution is ready".

The Bolshevik Party was banned in 1914, the Bolshevik faction of the State Duma was arrested. During the February Revolution, not a single member of the Central Committee of the Russian Social Democratic Labor Party (Bolsheviks) was in Petrograd – all of them were in exile or emigration.

The police managed to introduce a number of provocateurs into the ranks of the Bolsheviks. The provocateur Roman Malinovsky even managed to become a member of the Central Committee and in 1913 the Chairman of the Bolshevik faction in the Duma, but in 1914 he fled Russia under the threat of exposure. One of the last exposed provocateurs was Shurkanov, a member of the Petrograd Committee of the Russian Social Democratic Labor Party (Bolsheviks), who called on the Bolsheviks to take action during the February Revolution. Richard Pipes also points out that the police managed to infiltrate their agents even in the newspaper Pravda; all Lenin's articles in Pravda until July 1914 were reviewed by the police before being published. In 1913, the chief editor of Pravda was the provocateur Miron Chernomazov (Lyutekov, Moskvich).

The leadership of the party (the Foreign Bureau of the Central Committee) was in exile, the Russian Bureau of the Central Committee operated illegally in Russia, the composition of which was constantly changing due to arrests.

During the events, the last Tsarist Minister of Internal Affairs, Alexander Protopopov, arrested the members of the Petrograd Committee of the Russian Social Democratic Labor Party (Bolsheviks) who were in Petrograd, in connection with which the role of the Bolsheviks in the uprising that took place was insignificant, and their influence in the newly formed Petrograd Soviet was minimal.

Immediately after the February Revolution, the Bolsheviks were the third most influential party among the socialists, numbering only about 24 thousand members (in Petrograd – only 2 thousand) and constituted a minority in the Soviets. Although Soviet historiography dates the separation of the Bolsheviks into an independent party by 1912, in fact, at the time of the February Revolution, the demarcation from Menshevism had not yet been completed. Many socialists considered the split of the Russian Social Democratic Labor Party into Bolshevik and Menshevik factions as a temporary phenomenon; until 1913, the Bolsheviks and Mensheviks were even represented in the State Duma by one Social Democratic faction.

The Social Democratic faction of the Interdistrictites defended the restoration of a single Russian Social Democratic Labor Party; in 54 of the 68 provincial cities of Russia in March–April 1917 there were joint Bolshevik–Menshevik organizations of the Russian Social Democratic Labor Party. At the First Congress of Soviets of Workers' and Soldiers' Deputies in June 1917, 73 delegates declared their party affiliation as non–factional Social Democrats.

Just a few days before Lenin's arrival from exile, the All–Russian Conference of Bolsheviks on March 28 in Petrograd discusses the possibility of reuniting with the Mensheviks into a single party, and Stalin notes that "unification is possible along the Zimmerwald–Kienthal line".

At the First Congress of Soviets (June 1917), the Bolsheviks received only 12% of the seats. However, already at this congress, in response to the statements of the Menshevik Tsereteli that "At the moment there is no political party in Russia that would say: give us power, leave, we will take your place", Lenin declared from his seat: "There is such a party!".

From the diaries of Nicholas II, it is clear that back in May 1917 he vaguely imagined how the Bolsheviks differed from other revolutionaries. The May 1 entry noted that the council is being attacked "by some other organizations much more to the left". Leon Trotsky in his work "History of the Russian Revolution" notes that at the beginning of 1917 "the Bolsheviks were little known".

=== Growth of influence ===
The number of Bolsheviks increases from 24,000 in February 1917 to 240,000 in June and 350,000 by October. Mikhail Voslensky draws attention to the fact that, in contrast to the Socialist Revolutionaries, oriented towards the peasant majority, the Bolsheviks declared their main support of the factory workers, not so numerous, but better organized and more disciplined: "the experience of Land and Freedom showed that the hope for the peasantry as the main revolutionary force it did not justify itself. A handful of revolutionary intelligentsia was too small to turn over the colossus of the tsarist state without relying on some large class ... Such a large class in Russia in those conditions could only be the proletariat, which was rapidly growing in numbers at the turn of the 19th and 20th centuries. ... The Narodniks' attempt to rely on the majority of the population – the peasantry – has failed, therefore the Leninists are guided by the minority, but organized and disciplined – by the working class in order to seize power by its hands". At the beginning of 1917, the Bolsheviks were not supporters of the "socialization of the land" (that is, the distribution of all land directly to peasant communities), defending the principle of "nationalization of the land" (that is, the transfer of all land to state ownership).

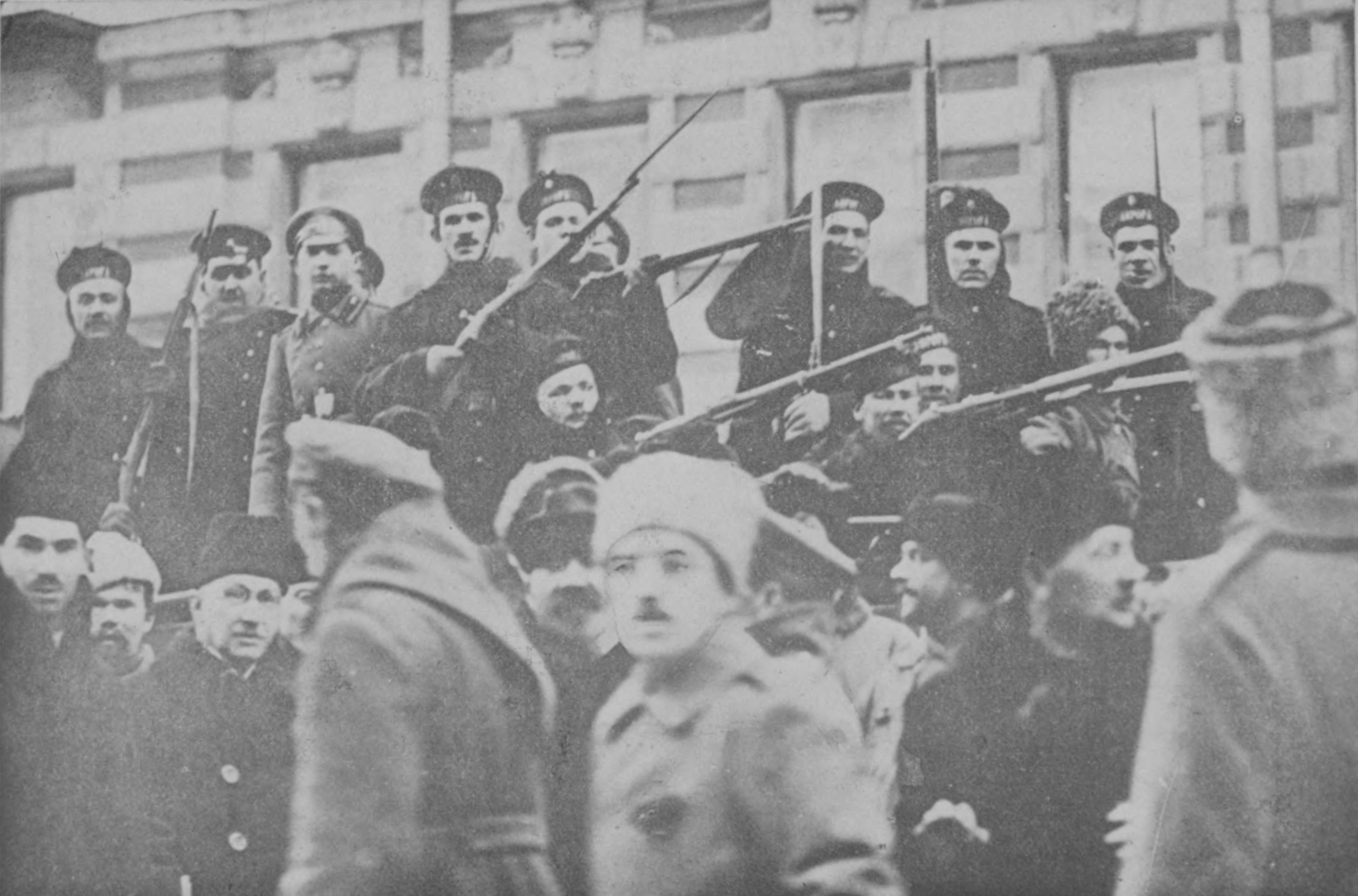
Revolutionary Baltic sailors, 1917

The Bolsheviks put forward a number of populist slogans, among which the key was the demand for an immediate separate peace with Germany ("a democratic peace without annexations and indemnities"), which attracted wavering masses of soldiers and sailors to their side. The sympathies of the workers were attracted by the support for "workers' control" over production and the factory committees. By the fall of 1917, the Bolsheviks also effectively abandoned the slogan of "nationalizing the land" and "intercepting" the Socialist Revolutionary slogan of "socializing" it (that is, distributing it to the peasants).

The Bolshevik Decree on Land, one of the first to be adopted after coming to power, actually carried out a Socialist Revolutionary program. According to Lenin, the Bolsheviks adopted "the decisions of the lower classes, although we did not agree with them". Particularly strongly influenced by Lenin was the publication by the Socialist Revolutionaries at the First All–Russian Congress of Soviets of Peasant Deputies in August 1917 of a consolidated peasant order, generalized of 242 orders. The consolidated mandate directly demanded "equalizing labor" distribution of landlord land among the peasants, with the exception of only a few "highly cultured former landlord farms". Already reading the Decree on Land at the Second All–Russian Congress of Soviets of Workers' and Soldiers' Deputies, Lenin stated in his report:

Here voices are heard that the decree and the order itself were drawn up by the Socialist Revolutionaries. So be it. Does it matter who it was drawn up, but, as a democratic government, we cannot bypass the decision of the lower classes, even if we disagreed with it. In the fire of life, applying it in practice, conducting it in the field, the peasants themselves will understand where the truth is. And even if the peasants continue to follow the Socialist Revolutionaries and even if they even give this party a majority at the Constituent Assembly, then here too we will say: so be it. Life is the best teacher, and it will show who is right, and let the peasants from one end, and we will solve this issue from the other end.

In fact, the peasants have already begun mass land grabbing since April 1917; The Interim Government was unable to stop this process. At the same time, the course taken by the Bolsheviks for the immediate construction of "socialism" as a whole in 1917 was incomprehensible to the "masses".

By November 1917, the more energetic and better organized Bolsheviks were pushing back other socialist parties. The influence of the Bolsheviks becomes predominant in the Soviets of large industrial cities, on the fronts and fleets (first of all, on the Northern and Western Fronts and the Baltic Fleet). In the Petrograd Soviet, the Bolsheviks occupy up to 90% of the seats in September–October 1917. At the same time, the popularity of the Bolsheviks in small towns remains insignificant, and Socialist Revolutionaries dominate in the villages.

By October 1917, the number of the Bolshevik party reached 350,000, the Mensheviks – up to 200,000.

The structure of the Bolshevik Party in 1917 was marked by considerable flexibility. After Lenin returned from emigration in April 1917, the Foreign Bureau and the Russian Bureau of the Central Committee, which had become meaningless in connection with the legalization of the party, were abolished, the Military Organization of the Central Committee and the Secretariat of the Central Committee, as well as the Press Bureau were formed.

In August, national sections appeared in the party's structure, primarily Lithuanian and Jewish, a group was formed to lead the trade union movement, a municipal group under the Central Committee. In August, the Political Bureau was formed, but the Central Committee remained the main decision–making center in October–December 1917. The composition of the Central Committee of the Russian Social Democratic Labor Party (Bolsheviks), which made the decision on the armed uprising, was elected in the composition of 21 people at the Sixth Congress of the Russian Social Democratic Labor Party (Bolsheviks) on July 26 – August 3, 1917.

=== Bolshevik Committee ===
The composition of the Central Committee of the Russian Social Democratic Labor Party (Bolsheviks), which decided on an armed uprising in October 1917, was elected at the Sixth Congress of the Russian Social Democratic Labor Party (Bolsheviks), held on August 8–18, 1917. The historic decision on the uprising was adopted at a meeting on October 23 by a vote, 10 votes to 2 (Kamenev and Zinoviev). The decision was confirmed at an enlarged meeting of the Central Committee on October 16.

Several structures were formed to lead the uprising: the Political Bureau (October 10), the Military Revolutionary Committee of the Petrograd Soviet (October 12), and the Revolutionary Military Center (October 16). Unlike the Political Bureau and the Military Revolutionary Center, which were institutions of the Russian Social Democratic Labor Party (Bolsheviks), the Military Revolutionary Committee was an institution of the Petrograd Soviet, that is, a Soviet, and not a party organ. The Political Bureau, first organized on October 23, 1917, did not have the same power at that time as this body received in the last decades of the Soviet Union; the Political Bureau became a permanent body only in 1919.

Members of the Central Committee
Name	Nationality	Age
Fyodor Sergeev	Russian	34
Jan Berzin	Latvian	28
Andrey Bubnov	Russian	33
Nikolay Bukharin	Russian	29
Felix Dzerzhinsky	Pole	40
Grigory Zinoviev	Jew	34
Lev Kamenev	Russian	34
Alexandra Kollontai	Ukrainian	45
Vladimir Lenin	Russian	47
Vladimir Milyutin	Russian	33
Matvey Muranov	Ukrainian	44
Victor Nogin	Russian	39
Alexey Rykov	Russian	36
Yakov Sverdlov	Jew	32
Ivar Smilga	Latvian	24
Nikolay Krestinsky	Ukrainian	34
Grigory Sokolnikov	Jew	29
Joseph Stalin	Georgian	39
Leon Trotsky	Jew	38
Moisey Uritsky	Jew	44
Stepan Shaumyan	Armenian	39

Candidates for members of the Central Committee
Name	Nationality	Age
Prokofiy Japaridze	Georgian	37
Adolf Joffe	Jew	35
Alexey Kiselev	Russian	38
Georgy Oppokov	Russian	29
Valerian Obolensky	Russian	30
Evgeny Preobrazhensky	Russian	31
Nikolay Skripnik	Ukrainian	45
Elena Stasova	Russian	44
Ivan Teodorovich	Pole	42
Varvara Yakovleva	Russian	32

Total: 31 people, 14 Great Russians (45%), 17 Russians (Great Russians, Little Russians and White Russians) (55%), 6 Jews (19.3%), 2 Latvians (6%), 2 Poles (6%), 2 Georgians (6%), 1 Armenian (3%).

Average age: 36.

Further fate:

Killed during the Civil War: 3 (10%) Uritsky (shot by a Socialist Revolutionary terrorist), Shaumyan (shot among 26 Baku commissars), Japaridze (shot among 26 Baku commissars).

Died in the 1920s: 6 (19%) Sergeev (died in 1921 during tests of the air car), Dzerzhinsky, Lenin, Nogin, Sverdlov (died in 1919), Ioffe.

Killed during the "Great Purge": 18 (58%) Berzin, Bubnov, Bukharin, Zinoviev, Kamenev, Milyutin, Rykov, Smilga, Krestinsky, Sokolnikov, Trotsky (liquidated by an agent of the People's Commissariat of Internal Affairs in Mexico in 1940), Kiselev, Lomov (Oppokov), Obolensky (Osinsky), Preobrazhensky, Skripnik (committed suicide during the campaign of persecution), Teodorovich, Yakovleva (sentenced to 20 years in 1937, died in 1944).

Survived the purge: 4 (13%) Kollontai, Muranov, Stalin, Stasova.

The ethnic composition of the repressed: 9 Russians (50%), 4 Jews (22%), 2 Latvians (11%), 2 Ukrainians (11%), 1 Pole (6%).

After the Bolsheviks came to power, the structure of their party continued to change; the number of various national sections in March 1918 reached nine, including the Czechoslovak and Anglo–American sections. Organizations such as the Workers' Bureau and the Organizational Bureau were formed.

=== Analysis of the composition of parties ===
Valery Zhuravlev draws attention to a comparison of the composition of parties such as the Bolsheviks and Constitutional Democrats:

- Bolsheviks:
  - Age composition: about half are between 26 and 35 years old, one in fifteen is under 26 years old. As of 1907, the average age of the Bolsheviks was even less than 30 years old.
  - Social composition: every third of the lower strata of the city and village, every second – from the middle strata of provincial cities, every fourth – from the non–capital elite. About 36% are workers.
  - Data collected by the credentials committee of the Fifth Congress of the Russian Social Democratic Labor Party on the Bolshevik delegates. Russians among the 105 Bolsheviks were almost 80%. Workers accounted for 36%, writers and representatives of other liberal professions – 27%, commercial and industrial employees – 11%, etc. Higher education had 20% of the Bolshevik delegates, secondary – 32%, the lowest – 37%, home – 2%, 9% declared themselves self–taught. The average age of the Bolshevik delegate was less than 30 years old.
- Constitutional Democrats:
  - Age composition: one in fifteen at the age of 31–35, the bulk is much older. Every third person is over 52 years old.
  - Social composition: mainly the elite of large cities.
  - Ethnic composition: Russians ("Great Russians") – 88%, Jews – 6%.
- Mensheviks:
  - Social composition: radical intelligentsia, "labor aristocracy".
  - National composition (data for 1907): 34% Russians, 29% Georgians, 23% Jews. Among the Mensheviks, an unusually high percentage of Georgians is noted; of the significant Mensheviks, one can single out Nikolay Chkheidze, chairman of the executive committee of the Petrograd Soviet in its first composition, and Irakli Tsereteli, a member of the first composition of the executive committee of the Petrograd Soviet and the Minister of Posts and Telegraphs in the second composition of the Provisional Government.

In 1914, 27 of the 32 members of the Central Committee of the Constitutional Democratic Party were hereditary nobles (including 2 titled), 1 – a personal nobleman, 2 – hereditary honorary citizens, 1 – a bourgeoisie, 1 – a "foreigner" (Jew). 13 members of the Central Committee were landowners, 6 had their own enterprises or were members of the boards and councils of various economic societies. By professional affiliation, 19 members of the Central Committee were zemstvo leaders, 11 had academic degrees, 6 were lawyers, and 1 was an engineer. Among the permanent leaders of the Constitutional Democratic Party were Pavel Milyukov, princes Peter and Pavel Dolgorukov belonging to the Rurik family, Prince Dmitry Shakhovskoy, Prince Vladimir Obolensky, Academician Vladimir Vernadsky, professors Sergey Muromtsev, Vladimir Gessen, Lev Petrazhitsky, Sergei Kotlyarovsky.

The Central Committee of the Constitutional Democratic Party, elected in May 1917, consisted of 66 people, including 5 princes, one baron, one countess, several large bankers and industrialists, about 20 professors, etc. According to the memoirs of Ariadna Tyrkova, "We had almost no youth ... Many Constitutional Democratic professors were extremely popular, but students did not join the professorial party. Only a few high schools had student Constitutional Democratic groups. The student also had to have the courage to preach Constitutional Democracy in the student environment. We were too moderate for the youth".

According to the data cited by Richard Pipes, in 1907, 38% of the Bolsheviks and 26% of the Mensheviks were peasants, and they did not live in the villages, but declassed elements who had gone to the city. Lenin received the main support from the provinces of Central Russia, while the Mensheviks were most popular in Georgia.

Other features of the Bolshevik party were a low level of education (only every fifth – higher and every fourth – incomplete higher), among the Bolshevik elites there is an unusually large proportion of those who were brought up in childhood without fathers (37%).

The researcher Vadim Kozhinov, having analyzed the ethnic composition of the Central Committee of the Bolshevik Party in the period 1917–1922, includes 27 Russians, 10 Jews and 11 persons of other nationalities (Latvians, Poles, Georgians, Armenians, etc.).

Another way to compare the composition of parties is to analyze the age, educational and national composition of the deputies of the Constituent Assembly by faction. This analysis shows that the average age of the Bolshevik faction was the smallest and amounted to 34 years. At the same time, the average age of the Socialist Revolutionary faction was 37, the Mensheviks – 42, and the Constitutional Democrats – 48. The level of education also differs greatly by faction: it was the highest among Constitutional Democrats (up to 100% with higher education). Among the Socialist Revolutionary deputies of the Constituent Assembly, 66% of people had higher and incomplete higher education, among the Bolsheviks – 54% (32% higher, 22% – incomplete higher education).

In terms of the ethnic composition of the Constituent Assembly, the most diverse was the Bolshevik faction, in which 54% were Russians, 23% Jews, 6.5% Poles and Balts each. In the Socialist Revolutionary faction, Russians accounted for 72%, Jews – 14%.

By the will of the tyrants, peoples tormented each other,
You got up, labor Petersburg,
And the first one started the war of all the oppressed;
Against all oppressors;
To kill the very seed of war.

No victims – heroes lie under this grave;
Not grief, but envy, is your fate in hearts;
All grateful descendants on terrible red days;
Gloriously you lived and died beautifully.

— Epitaphs at the memorial on the Champ de Mars in Saint Petersburg

Vladimir Lenin was 47 years old in 1917, as can be seen from the above data, he was noticeably older than the bulk of the Bolsheviks. In this environment, it is not surprising that one of Lenin's pseudonyms appeared – "The Old Man", which he, however, began to use as early as 1901–1909. Some researchers also mention Lenin's pseudonym – "Beard".

=== Democratic centralism ===
One of the features of the Bolsheviks was a rigid organization based on the principle of democratic centralism, proposed by Lenin in his theoretical work of 1902 "What Is to Be Done?". The principles of building a Bolshevik party developed by Lenin meant strict discipline, the subordination of the lower to the higher and the obligation to fulfill the decisions made, which was described as a "party of a new type".

Rosa Luxemburg, in her article in the Iskra newspaper of July 10, 1904, describes Lenin's approach as follows: "Lenin's point of view is the point of view of merciless centralism ... In this view, the Central Committee, for example, has the right to organize all local party committees and, consequently, to determine the personnel of each individual local organization, to give them a ready–made charter, to dissolve them categorically and re–create them, and as a result, thus indirectly influence the composition of the highest party authority – the congress. Thus, the Central Committee is the only really active core of the party, all the other organizations are only its executive bodies".

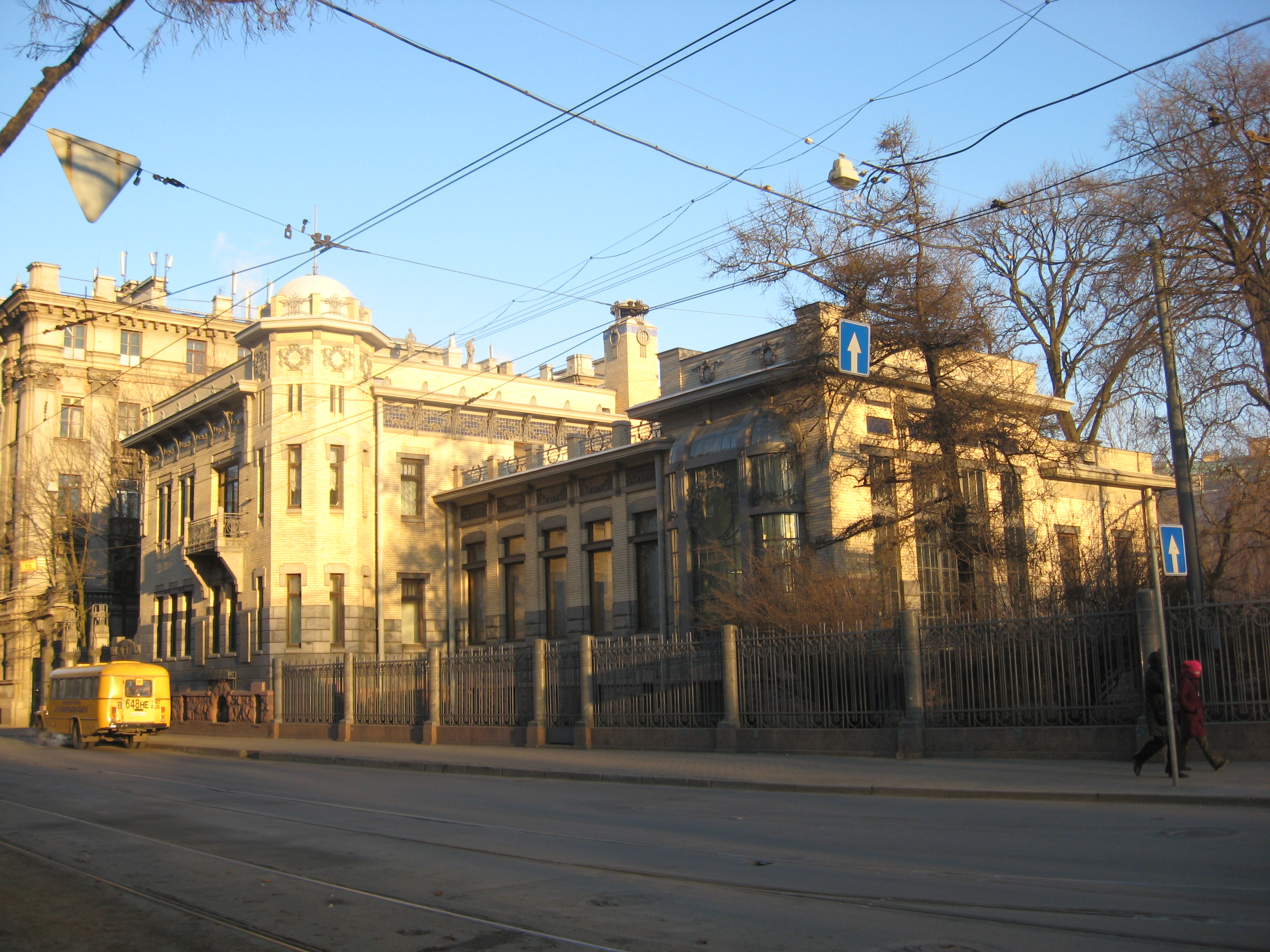
The Kshesinskaya mansion, the residence of the Bolsheviks in March–July 1917

According to Trotsky's statement in August 1904, "In internal party politics, these methods of Lenin lead to the fact that ... the Central Committee replaces the party organization and, finally, the dictator replaces the Central Committee". One of the founders of Russian Marxism, the Menshevik Pavel Axelrod, expressed himself even more rudely, calling the Leninist organization "a simplified copy ... of the bureaucratic–autocratic system ... of the Minister of Internal Affairs". Researcher Mikhail Voslensky calls such an organization «a revolutionary "mafia"», "a military organization of agents", "where democracy was considered an unnecessary game, and everything was based on conspiracy and mutual responsibility".

A similar hierarchical centralized organization was created by Lenin, including under the influence of "Narodnaya Volya", which included Lenin's older brother, Alexander Ulyanov, who was hanged in 1887 for attempting to assassinate Alexander III. As far as Lenin himself was able to find out first–hand, "Narodnaya Volya", in contrast to "Earth and Freedom", had a hierarchical command structure of a paramilitary type headed by the executive committee. At the same time, the executive committee made all decisions not by order of the "dictator", but only collectively. According to the data cited by Richard Pipes, in the period 1887–1891, in his views, Lenin actually became a supporter of Narodnaya Volya, on his own initiative looking for the oldest members of the movement in Kazan and Samara and questioning them about the history of the movement and its practical organization. Lenin himself in 1904 describes the principle of "democratic centralism" as follows: "the organizational principle of revolutionary social democracy ... seeks to proceed from above, defending the expansion of the rights and powers of the center in relation to the part". Separately, Lenin emphasizes the need for timely and regular disposal of the party from its ineffective members: "to get rid of an unfit member, the organization of real revolutionaries will not stop at any means".

Over the past 10 years, the most energetic, vigorous, and capable of tireless struggle, resistance and constant organization has been the element, those organizations and those persons who are concentrated around Lenin. ... There is no doubt that Lenin is the constant organizing soul of all more or less serious party undertakings. In addition, he is essentially the only practically revolutionary leader, and therefore only elements who are selflessly loyal to him and revolutionary–minded adhere to him. This circumstance is the reason why the Leninist faction is always better organized than others, stronger in its unanimity, more inventive in terms of putting its ideas into the working environment and applying it to the political situation.

— Report of the tsarist police department "On the Current Situation of the Russian Social Democratic Labor Party", 1913

The principle of centralized but collegial leadership, characteristic of Narodnaya Volya, was also observed in the Bolshevik Party at least until the second half of 1918. Lenin always enjoyed tremendous authority among the Bolsheviks as the founder of the party, a charismatic leader and the main party ideologist, but his power was not absolute. A number of key decisions were taken by a majority vote of the Central Committee, contrary to Lenin's clearly expressed will. Thus, in November 1917, the Central Committee refused to expel Zinoviev and Kamenev from the party, confining itself to a ban "to make statements that run counter to the party's line", and Lenin resigned himself to this decision. In preparation for an armed uprising, the majority of the Central Committee rejected Lenin's demand to start the uprising immediately and postponed it until the Second All–Russian Congress of Soviets was convened, in accordance with Trotsky's proposal. This circumstance aroused extreme concern in Lenin, and he repeatedly "pressed" on his comrades–in–arms, demanding to accelerate the preparation for the uprising.

It also cost Lenin great efforts to "push through" the decision to conclude the Brest Peace Treaty on German terms. The majority of the Central Committee supports Trotsky's formula "no peace, no war", and after the final collapse of this formula, the decision on peace is made by the Central Committee only after Lenin's threat to resign, which threatened the Bolsheviks with a split and a serious political crisis with unpredictable consequences.

Richard Pipes in his research claims that Lenin's power became absolute only by the end of 1918, after he recovered from the assassination attempt on August 30, 1918; a rapid recovery after a seemingly fatal wound was superimposed on the traditional for Russia notions of the sacredness of the tsar. Vladimir Bonch–Bruevich, in the first edition of his memoirs, claimed that the sight of the wounded Lenin reminded him of "the removal from the cross of Christ, crucified by priests, bishops and the rich". The general opinion of the Bolshevik elites was expressed by Kamenev, who had repeatedly argued with Lenin earlier, who declared that "... the further, the more I am convinced that Ilyich is never wrong. In the end, he is always right ... How many times it seemed that he fell through – in the forecast or in the political course, and in the end, both his forecast and the course were always justified".

=== Vanguard of the working class and introduction of consciousness ===
Another ideological innovation, formulated by Lenin in his "What Is to Be Done?", was the terms "bringing in consciousness" and "vanguard of the working class". Lenin assumed that the factory workers by themselves may not show "consciousness", presenting not political, but only economic demands ("trade unionism"), "the class political consciousness can be brought to the worker only from the outside ... by its own efforts the working class is able to develop only the consciousness of the trade unionist". It was the "party of a new type" that was supposed to deal with this "bringing in of consciousness", acting here as the "vanguard" ("the vanguard of the working class"). As Richard Pipes points out, Lenin arrived at this view through personal contact with workers in the 1890s, "the only period of his life when he had direct contact with the so–called proletariat".

According to Lenin's plan, the Bolshevik Party was built as an "organization of professional revolutionaries", since it was assumed that the core of the party would professionally engage only in "revolutionary activities", receiving its content at the expense of the party ("anything talented and "promising" agitator of the workers should not work at the factory for 11 hours. We must make sure that he lives on the means of the Party"). The socialists competing with Lenin did not have such an organization. Lenin called the absence of "professional revolutionaries" in other parties "handicraft".

An attempt to put such principles into practice leads to the fact that at the Second Congress of the Russian Social Democratic Labor Party (1903) Lenin got into a personal quarrel with the leader of Menshevism Yuli Martov, and the Russian Social Democratic Labor Party – to a split into Bolshevik and Menshevik factions. Since Lenin did not succeed in transforming the entire Social Democratic Party on his own principles, he is taking a course to form his faction into a separate party, forming parallel party structures; thus, at the end of 1904, his supporters formed the Bureau of Majority Committees, in fact a parallel Central Committee of the still united Russian Social Democratic Labor Party. At the Fourth Congress of the Russian Social Democratic Labor Party (1906) in Stockholm, the Bolsheviks, despite their name, find themselves in the minority. The Fifth Congress of the Russian Social Democratic Labor Party (1907) in London was accompanied by a bitter struggle between the two factions.

As the historian Yuri Felshtinsky points out, the policy of splitting the Russian Social Democratic Labor Party into Menshevik and Bolshevik factions was supported by the Police Department, which recklessly believed that this would weaken the revolutionary movement. One of the most consistent supporters of the split of the Social Democrats was the police provocateur Roman Malinovsky.

Long–term (1903–1917) factional struggle against the Mensheviks allowed Lenin to accumulate considerable political experience. Richard Pipes in his work "The Russian Revolution. Book 2. The Bolsheviks in the Struggle for Power (1917–1918)" draws attention to the fact that Lenin actively used in 1917–1918 the method he first tested during the split of the Russian Social Democratic Labor Party in 1903. If it was impossible to seize any organ, the Bolsheviks formed another, parallel organ from their supporters, bearing the same name. Thus, in November 1917, the Bolsheviks split the Pro–Socialist Revolutionary Second Congress of Soviets of Peasant Deputies, forming a parallel Congress of their supporters, and in January 1918 neutralized the All–Russian Executive Committee of the Railway Trade Union, forming a parallel All–Russian Executive Committee of Railway Workers.

Researcher Mikhail Voslensky, in his fundamental work Nomenclature, comments on Lenin's principles of "bringing consciousness" and "the vanguard of the working class" as follows:

...All of a sudden intellectuals come to the worker... and declare: "Your point of view is not at all of your class. We intellectuals will teach you your class interest". Isn't it strange? Not only strange, but suspicious. And the further you listen to the reasoning of the smart intellectuals, the more suspicious it becomes. Indeed: what is the worker's point of view? He wants to increase his earnings and improve working conditions. For this he is ready to fight, uniting with other workers. So why is this not the class interest of the worker? "This is trade unionism", the intelligentsia scare them with an incomprehensible, but apparently abusive word. "This is a betrayal of the interests of the working class!".

What are these interests, according to the intellectuals who have appeared? It turns out, that the party led by them, the intelligentsia, came to power in the state. Excuse me, whose class – or group – interest are these intellectuals trying to "bring" into the consciousness of the worker: his or their own? Of course, the intellectuals–party members promise the worker that with their coming to power they themselves will vegetate for a pittance and work day and night in the name of his interests, for him rivers of milk will flow in the banks of the jelly. But if the worker is smart, he will realize that the rivers, if they flow, will not be for him, and zealous intellectuals are unlikely to work for him, and no matter how he works for them.

Does it mean that the intellectuals are deceiving him? Certainly. Does it mean that rivers of milk will really flow for them? Unfortunate ones, they do not yet suspect that after their victory rivers of their blood will flow!

== Anarchists ==
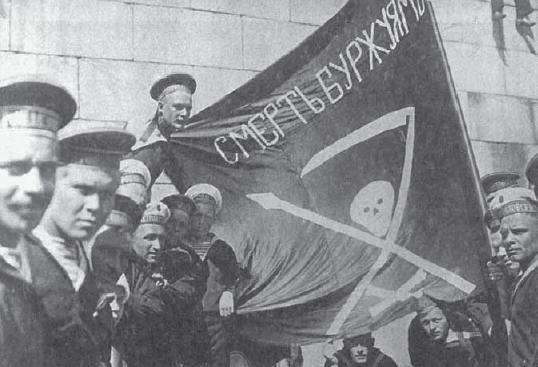
Revolutionary sailors – anarchists in Helsingfors in the summer of 1917

The movement of anarchists in Russia noticeably intensified during the 1905 revolution, the number of anarchist groups in the period 1905–1907 in comparison with 1903 increased by about ten times. The main ideologues of Russian anarchism were Mikhail Bakunin and Pyotr Kropotkin, who developed the doctrine of "anarcho–communism" as a free union of separate communities ("communes") without any central state power at all.

According to researcher Valery Kryvenky, anarchists were distinguished by a number of features:

We are called villains. This screaming pack assumes that we are only capable of plunder, as they call our expropriations. Isn't this the most ardent protest against property? We weaken by this the state, the government, which kills a lot of people and forces to fight us, weakening ourselves by this and giving rise to self–hatred by its cruelty towards us. I, openly exposing my life to mortal danger, go to "ex". I need money for food, for my ideological work, in order to go to a concert, to a theater, to a lecture where people preach their religion from the podium, in order to buy a box of "Pskov" cakes, sweets, fruits, good port wine, or just hire a reckless driver and shoot an arrow along Sumskaya, as our "anointed folk" fly. I use everything, and I only take, but I don't give anything. I only destroy. Life is a struggle, inequality in struggle, beauty in inequality. It is through this chaos of the existing that the "robbers" go to the new. Alone, alone, without any nicknames or organizations.

— Article "Confession" in the newspaper of individualist anarchists "Towards the Light", Kharkov, January 5, 1920
- Extreme organizational atomization. In Russian anarchism, small groups predominated, from 3 to 30 people, united in larger "federations".
- A number of ideological divisions. Among the currents of anarchism, dominated by "anarcho–communism" based on the ideas of Kropotkin, "anarcho–syndicalism" (shifting the main attention to the organization of professional associations) and "anarcho–individualism" with the ideas of general and immediate anarchy, especially attractive to the lumpen proletariat (anarchism, anarcho–universalism, anarcho–biocosmism, anarcho–humanism, neonihilism and Makhaevshchina). The "Anarcho–Communists", in turn, split into "Khlebovoltsy" (the emigrant organization "Bread and Freedom"), "Beznachaltsy", "Chernoznamentsy" (after the name of the newspaper "Chernoe Znamya") and "Anarcho–Cooperators" (a group publishing house and magazine "Pochin"). On the issue of war in the Russian anarchist movement, there was a split between the so–called "anarcho–trenches" and "anarcho–internationalists". The anarcho–syndicalists also did not escape schisms; the anarcho–federalists (Nikolai Proferansov, Nikolai Lebedev) subsequently emerged from them. Due to the extreme diversity of the anarchist movement, in 1917 the anarchists did not even manage to hold their All–Russian Congress.
- The sharp, even in comparison with the Bolsheviks, predominance of the youth; in 1905–1907, the average age of anarchists was 18–24 years, education is not higher than primary. In terms of ethnic composition, among the anarchists in the period 1905–1907, there were 50% of Jews, about 41% of Russians. The social base of the anarchists was, first of all, the declassified elements, artisans, small traders, workers of small enterprises.
- Reliance on acts of "direct action" (terror and expropriation). The most successful act of the anarchists was the robbery in the amount of 250 thousand rubles in October 1907 from the treasury in the Georgian city of Dusheti. Many anarchist groups are formed with names like "Bloody Hand", "Avengers", "Hawk", the line between expropriation and robbery for the purpose of personal enrichment turns out to be rather fragile for a number of them.

The defeat of the first Russian revolution leads to the almost complete defeat of anarchist associations. By 1913, their number dropped to 7 (in 1908 – 108 groups). The surviving groups are mainly concerned with issuing proclamations; however, in 1911 the Moscow anarchists succeeded in carrying out a number of successful raids ("expropriations") on state–owned wine warehouses and postal and telegraph offices.

The February Revolution leads to the restoration of Russian anarchism; already on March 13, 1917, the Moscow Federation of Anarchist Groups was established. The anarchists already in March 1917 put forward slogans for the dispersal of the Provisional Government ("immediate reprisals against the ministers of the old government"), the transfer of all power to the Soviets, the introduction of anarcho–syndicalist workers' control in industry, and an immediate end to the war. The liquidation of individual police officers, expropriations, seizures of newspapers and printing houses are carried out. Moscow becomes the main center of the anarchist movement, in Petrograd the headquarters of the anarchists is located in the unauthorizedly seized former dacha of Durnovo. Anarcho–syndicalists control individual factory committees and trade unions, primarily the trade unions of bakers, port workers, metalworkers. The revolutionary naval bases in Kronstadt and Helsingfors became major centers of anarchism.

Anarchists declare:

1. All adherents of the old regime must be immediately removed from their places.

2. All orders of the new reactionary government that pose a danger to freedom – to cancel.

3. Immediate reprisals against the ministers of the old government.

4. Realization of real freedom of speech and press.

5. Issuance of weapons and ammunition to all combat groups and organizations.

6. Material support for our comrades who have been released from prison.

At this stage, the tactical goals of the anarchists fully coincide with the Bolsheviks. In July and October 1917, the Bolsheviks and anarchists act together (see also Conflict over the Durnovo dacha). The rapprochement was also facilitated by Lenin's work "State and Revolution", written by him in 1917 during the underground in Finland, and in many respects coincided with certain anarchist ideas. With the formation of the Petrograd Military Revolutionary Committee, it includes three anarchists: Iosif Bleikhman, Justin Zhuk, Konstantin Akashev.

The disagreements between the anarchists and the Bolsheviks begin almost immediately after October 1917, with the outlined course towards building a new centralized state machine. Anarchists are especially hostile to the establishment in December 1917 of the Supreme Council of the National Economy, an organ of centralized management of industry, opposing it with the anarcho–syndicalist idea of organizing free decentralized factory committees and agricultural committees from below. The slogan of the so–called "third revolution", which was supposed to destroy the power of the Bolsheviks, was spreading more and more among the anarchists.

== See also ==
- List of political parties in Russia
- List of political parties in the Soviet Union
