= Eparchy of Kyiv (Moscow Patriarchate) =

Eparchy of Moscow Patriarchat in Ukraine; on territory of Ukraine

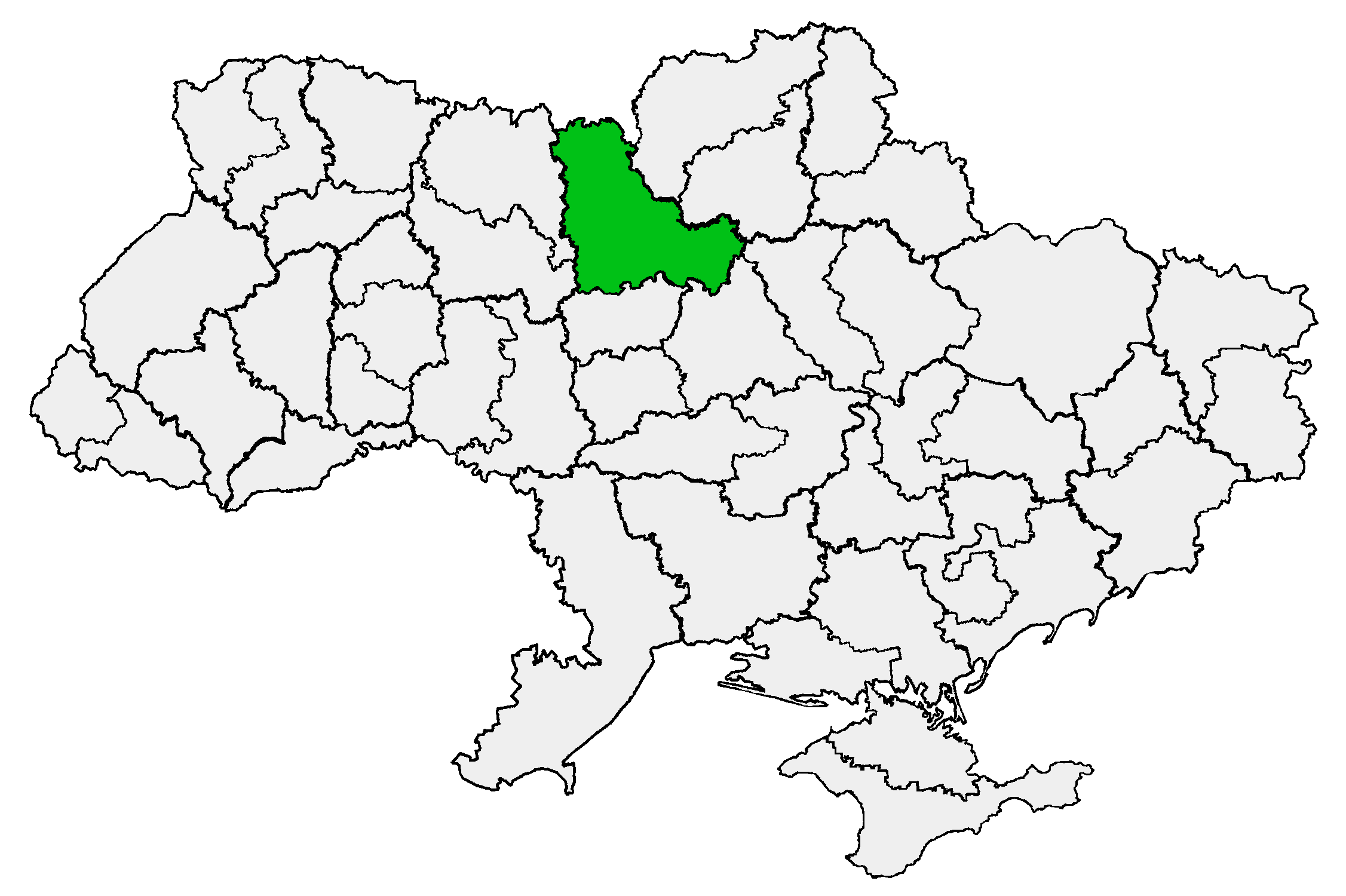
Eparchy of Kyiv of the Ukrainian Orthodox Church (Moscow Patriarchate)

Eparchy of Kyiv (Ukrainian: Київська єпархія, Russian: Киевская епархия) is central eparchy of the Ukrainian Orthodox Church (Moscow Patriarchate) under the supreme ecclesiastical jurisdiction of the Russian Orthodox Church.

The seat of Eparchy is in Kyiv. Eparchy is primatial, its head being the Metropolitan of Kyiv and all Ukraine. Since 2014, office is held by Metropolitan Onufriy (Berezovsky).

== History ==
The eparchy claims its heritage to the original eparchy of Kyiv that dates back to the establishment of the Old Russian (Ruthenian) Church under the jurisdiction of Ecumenical Patriarchate of Constantinople. Old Russian (Ruthenian) Kyiv diocese (or archdiocese) is first mentioned in 891, as the 60th by ranks of honor in the list of departments subordinate to the Patriarch of Constantinople, and 61st in the charter of Emperor Leo (886-911). From its beginnings, eparchy of Kyiv was central or primatial diocese of the Metropolitanate, which also included a number of other dioceses, created after the baptism of Kievan Rus during the rule of Great Prince Vladimir in 988.

In reality the eparchy history starts since 1685–1686, when the eparchy of Kyiv, along with all the Metropolitan of Kyiv, has been "transferred" from the Patriarchate of Constantinople to the Moscow.

By Tsar Peter I the Metropolitan of Kyiv in the early 18th century became known as archbishop. This lasted until the middle of the century, when the decree of Empress Elizabeth Petrovna, they were again granted the dignity of the Metropolitan. In the 17th and 18th centuries, Kyiv diocese consisted of two parts on the right and left banks of the Dnieper River, within subsequently ceded to Chernihiv and Poltava provinces. Most of the diocese called itself "the Diocese of Kyiv" and smaller - "Abroad". The jurisdiction of the metropolitan of Kyiv in the 18th century, was chaplain of Warsaw within Poland.

Since 1918, the decision of the All-Russian Church Council of 1917-1918 Kyiv bishops again become the heads of not only the diocese, but the Church and the autonomous region within Ukraine. After its liquidation by order of Patriarch Tikhon was established Ukrainian Exarchate. The Bishops' Council of the Russian Orthodox Church, 25–27 October 1990, established autonomous and self-governing Ukrainian Orthodox Church, with its primatial Diocese of Kyiv, managed since 1992 by Metropolitan Volodymyr Sabodan who died in 2014.

== Ruling bishops ==
- Gedeon Chetvertinsky
- Varlaam Jasinsky
- Joasaph Krokovsky
- Varlaam Vonatovich
- Raphael Zaborovsky
- Timothy Shcherbatsky
- Arsenius Mohylansky
- Gavril Kremenetsky
- Hilarion Kondratovsky (acting)
- Samuel Myslavsky
- Hierothenius Malitsky
- Gavril Bănulescu-Bodoni
- Serapion Aleksandrovsky
- Yevgeny Bolkhovitinov
- Filaret Amfiteatrov
- Isidore Nikolsky
- Arsenius Moskvin
- Filothy Uspiensky
- Platon Gorodetsky
- Joannicius Rudniev
- Silvester Malevansky (acting)
- Theognost Lebiediev
- Flavian Gorodetsky
- Vladimir Bogoyavlensky
- Nicodemus (Krotkov) (acting)

=== Exarchs of Ukraine ===
- Antony (Khrapovitsky)
- Nazarius Blinov (acting)
- Michael Yermakov (acting)
- Vasilius Bogdashevsky (acting)
- Makarius Karmazin (acting)
- Michael Yermakov
- Sergius Kuminsky (acting)
- Georgius Dieliyev (acting)
- Dimitrius Verbitsky
- Sergius Grishin
- Constantine Dyakov
- Alexander Petrovsky (acting)
- Nicholas (Yarushevich)
  - Nazi occupation (Ukrainian Autonomous Orthodox Church, Panteleimon Rudyk)
- John Sokolov
- Joasaph Leliukhin
- Alypius Khotovitsky (acting)

=== Ukrainian Orthodox Church ===
- Filaret (Denysenko)
- Nicodemus (Rusnak) (acting)
- Volodymyr Sabodan
- Onufriy (Berezovsky)
