= List of monasteries of the Ukrainian Orthodox Church (Moscow Patriarchate) =

The Ukrainian Orthodox Church (Moscow Patriarchate) is an Eastern Orthodox religious body in Ukraine, with 251 monasteries and convents in its various dioceses.

== Autonomous Republic of Crimea ==
There are 22 monasteries one of them having a stauropegial status.

=== Dzhankoy Diocese ===
1. Transfiguration Monastery

=== Feodosiya Diocese (2) ===
1. Katerlez St. George's Convent
2. Kyzyltash St. Stephen of Sourozh's Monastery

=== Eparchy of Kyiv (1) ===
1. St. Paisius Velichkovsky's stauropegial Monastery

=== Simferopol Diocese (18) ===
1. Annunciation male metochion
2. Balaclava St. George's Monastery
3. Holy Dormition and St. Anastasia's Monastery
4. Holy Trinity Convent
5. Inkerman St. Clement's Monastery
6. Korsun Icon of the Mother of God female skete
7. Mangup Mountain Annunciation Monastery
8. Nativity of Christ male metochion
9. Protection of the Mother of God Monastery]
10. St. Anastasia the Great Martyr's male skete
11. St. Lazarus of Murom's Monastery
12. St. Luke the Apostle's Monastery
13. St. Nicholas's Monastery
14. St. Sabbas the Sanctifieds's Monastery
15. St. Theodore Stratelates the Great Martyr's Monastery
16. Sts. Cosma and Damian's Monastery
17. Toplovskiy St. Parasceva's Convent
18. Transfiguration male skete

== Cherkasy Oblast ==
There are 11 monasteries.

=== Cherkasy Diocese ===
1. Chyhyryn Holy Trinity Convent
2. Krasnohirskiy Protection of the Mother of God Convent
3. Lebedyn St. Nicholas's Convent
4. Motronynskyi Holy Trinity Convent
5. Nativity of the Most Holy Mother of God Monastery
6. St. Alexis the Man of God's Monastery
7. St. Onuphrius's Monastery
8. Transfiguration Convent

=== Uman Diocese ===
1. "Hegumenness of Holy Mt. Athos" Icon of the Mother of God Convent
2. St. George's Convent
3. St. Panteleimon's Convent

== Chernihiv Oblast ==
There are 12 monasteries.

=== Chernigiv Diocese ===
1. Danivka St. George's Convent
2. Domnytsya Nativity of the Most Holy Mother of God Monastery
3. Novhorod-Siverskyy Transfiguration Monastery
4. St. Lawrence of Chernihiv's Convent
5. Yeletskiy Holy Dormition Convent

=== Nizhyn Diocese ===
1. "Healer" Icon of the Mother of God female metochion
2. Annunciation Monastery
3. Entry of the Mother of God Convent
4. Hustynya Holy Trinity Convent
5. Krupytsky St. Nicholas's Convent
6. Meeting Of the Lord female metochion
7. Rykhly Desert St. Nicholas's Monastery

== Chernivtsi Oblast ==
=== Chernivtsi and Bukovina Diocese ===
1. "Gorecha" Nativity of the Most Holy Mother of God Monastery
2. Boyany Icon of the Mother of God Convent
3. Buncheny Ascension Monastery
4. Entry of the Mother of God Convent
5. Kolinkivtsi St. Vladimir's Monastery]
6. Kulivtsi Holy Dormition Monastery
7. Myrrh-bearers’ Convent
8. Neporotovo St. Nicholas's Monastery
9. Protection of the Mother of God Convent
10. St. Anne's Convent
11. St. Athanasius the Athonite's Convent
12. St. John of Sochava's Convent
13. St. John the Theologian's Monastery
14. St. Panteleimon's male metochion
15. St. Seraphim's Monastery

== Dnipropetrivsk Oblast ==
=== Dnipropetrovsk Diocese ===
1. "Holy Sign" Icon of the Mother of God Convent
2. Ascension Convent
3. Holy Trinity Desert Monastery
4. Samara St. Nicholas's Monastery]
5. Tikhvin Convent

=== Kamianske Diocese ===
1. Protection of the Mother of God Convent
2. St. Joseph's Convent

=== Eparchy of Kryvyi Rih ===
1. Protection of the Mother of God Convent
2. St. Vladimir the Priest-Martyr's Monastery

== Donetsk Oblast ==
=== Donetsk Diocese ===
1. "Joy of All Who Sorrows" Icon of the Mother of God female skete
2. All Saints' male skete
3. Holy Dormition female skete
4. Iberian Icon of the Mother of God Convent
5. Kasperivska Icon of the Mother of God Convent
6. St. Basil's Monastery
7. St. George's male skete
8. St. John of Shanghai's male skete
9. St. Nicholas's Convent
10. Sts. Antony and Theodosius of the Caves' male skete
11. Svyatohirsk Holy Dormition Lavra
12. Turkowice Icon of the Mother of God female skete]

=== Horlivka Diocese ===
1. Protection Mother of God female skete
2. St. Sergius of Radonezh's Convent
3. St. Stephen's Convent]

== Ivano-Frankivsk Oblast ==
=== Ivano-Frankivsk Diocese ===
1. Dukonya Holy Trinity Monastery
2. Protection of the Mother of God Convent
3. Uhornyky St. Michael the Archangel's Monastery]

== Kharkiv Oblast ==
=== Izium Diocese ===
1. Nativity of St. John the Forerunner male skete
2. Pisky Icon of the Mother of God Monastery
3. Sts. Boris and Gleb's Convent

=== Kharkiv Diocese ===
1. Protection of the Mother of God Monastery
2. St. Michael the Archangel's Convent

== Kherson Oblast ==
=== Kherson Diocese ===
1. Annunciation Convent
2. Protection of the Mother of God Monastery
3. St. Nicholas's female skete

=== Nova Kakhovka Diocese ===
1. Bizyukiv St. Gregory's Monastery
2. Korsun Icon of the Mother of God Convent

== Khmelnytskyi Oblast ==
=== Kamianets-Podilskyi Diocese ===
1. Holy Trinity Convent

=== Khmelnytskyi Diocese ===
1. "Life-Bearing Well" Icon of the Mother of God Convent
2. Exaltation of Cross Monastery
3. St. John the Forerunner's Monastery
4. St. Michael the Archangel's female skete
5. Transfiguration Convent

=== Shepetivka Diocese ===
1. Horodyshche Nativity of the Most Holy Mother of God Monastery
2. St. Alexander Nevsky's Convent
3. St. Anne's Convent

== Kirovohrad Oblast ==
=== Kropyvnytskyi Diocese ===
1. St. Elizabeth's Monastery

=== Oleksandriya Diocese ===
1. Protection of the Mother of God Monastery
2. Theophany Convent

== Kyiv Oblast ==
=== Bila Tserkva Diocese ===
1. Rzhyshchiv Transfiguration Monastery
2. St. Barbara the Great Martyr's Convent
3. St. Mary Magdalene the-Equal-to-the-Apostles' Convent
4. St. Seraphim's Monastery
5. Sts. Regal Martyrs' Convent

=== Boryspil Diocese ===
1. "Life-Bearing Well" Icon of the Mother of God Monastery
2. Ascension Monastery
3. Holy Dormition Convent
4. St. Michael the Archangel's Monastery
5. Transfiguration Monastery

=== Kyiv Diocese ===
1. "Comfort and Consolation" Icon of the Mother of God Convent
2. "Kyiv Brotherhood" Icon of the Mother of God Convent
3. "Listener" Icon of the Mother of God Convent
4. Annunciation Monastery
5. Deposition of Robe of the Mother of God in Blachernae Monastery
6. Flor’s Ascension Convent
7. Holosiyive Protection of the Mother of God Monastery
8. Holy Trinity and St. Jonah's Monastery
9. Kytayeve Holy Trinity Monastery
10. Kyiv Entry of the Mother of God Monastery
11. Kyiv Holy Dormition Caves Lavra
12. Nativity of the Most Holy Mother of God in Tserkovshchina Tract Monastery
13. Protection of the Mother of God Convent
14. St. Alexander of Rome the Martyr's male skete
15. St. Cyril's Monastery
16. St. Michael's stauropegial male metochion
17. St. Nicholas's female skete
18. St. Olga the-Equal-to-the-Apostles' Convent
19. St. Panteleimon's Convent
20. Tikhvin St. Nicholas's Convent
21. Tithe Nativity of the Most Holy Mother of God Monastery
22. Transfiguration Monastery
23. Transfiguration Convent
24. Ven. Anastasia of Kyiv's Convent
25. Zvirynets St. Michael the Archangel's Monastery

== Luhansk Oblast ==
=== Donetsk Diocese ===
1. St. Theodosius of Chernihiv's male skete

=== Luhansk Diocese ===
1. Ascension Monastery
2. Iberian Icon of the Mother of God female community]
3. Nativity of the Most Holy Mother of God Conven
4. St. John the Forerunner's Monastery
5. St. Olga the Regal Martyr's Convent

=== Rovenky Diocese ===
1. St. Andrew's Monastery

=== Severodonetsk Diocese ===
1. St. Elijah's Monastery
2. St. Sergius of Radonezh's Monastery
3. Starobilsk "Joy of All Who Sorrows" Icon of the Mother of God Convent

== Lviv Oblast ==
=== Lviv Diocese ===
1. St. Onuphrius's Monastery
2. Transfiguration Convent

== Mykolayiv Oblast ==
=== Mykolaiv Diocese ===
1. Pelahiyivka St. Michael the Archangel's Convent
2. Sts. Constantine and Helen's Monastery

== Odesa Oblast ==
=== Balta Diocese ===
1. "Joy of All Who Sorrows" Icon of the Mother of God Convent
2. Protection of the Mother of God and Balta St. Theodosius Monastery

=== Odesa Diocese ===
1. "Pantanassa" Icon of the Mother of God male skete
2. Ascension female skete
3. Borysivka Transfiguration Convent
4. Iberian Icon of the Mother of God Monastery
5. Nativity of Christ male skete
6. Nativity of the Most Holy Mother of God Convent
7. Nativity of the Most Holy Mother of God female skete
8. Odesa Holy Dormition Monastery
9. Protection of the Mother of God male skete
10. St. Elijah's Monastery
11. St. John the Forerunner's male skete
12. St. Michael the Archangel's Convent
13. St. Nicholas's Monastery
14. St. Panteleimon's Monastery
15. Sts. Constantine and Helen's Monastery]
16. Teplodar Resurrection Convent

== Poltava Oblast ==
=== Kremenchuk Diocese ===
1. Kozelshchyna Nativity of the Most Holy Mother of God Convent
2. Pototsky Sts. Antony and Theodosius's Monastery

=== Poltava Diocese ===
1. Holy Cross Exaltation Monastery
2. Mhar Transfiguration Monastery
3. Velyki Budyshcha Holy Trinity Convent

== Rivne Oblast ==
=== Moscow Diocese ===
1. Korets Holy Trinity Stauropegial Convent

=== Rivne Diocese ===
1. Annunciation Convent
2. Ascension female skete
3. Derman Holy Trinity Convent
4. Horodok St. Nicholas's Convent
5. Hoshcha Protection of the Mother of God Convent
6. Holy Dormition Monastery
7. Iberian Icon of the Mother of God Convent]
8. Mezhyrich Holy Trinity Monastery
9. Myrrh-bearers’ female skete
10. Nativity of the Most Holy Mother of God Convent
11. St. Anne's female skete
12. St. Barbara the Great Martyr's male skete
13. St. George's female metochion
14. The Synaxis of Twelve Apostles female skete

=== Sarny Diocese ===
1. "Life-Bearing Well" Icon of the Mother of God Monastery
2. Iberian Icon of the Mother of God Convent
3. Protection of the Mother of God Monastery]
4. Protection of the Mother of God Monastery
5. Volyn Icon of the Mother of God Convent]

== Sumy Oblast ==
=== Kyiv Diocese ===
1. Nativity of the Most Holy Mother of God Glinskaya Pustyn stauropegial Monastery

=== Konotop Diocese ===
1. Molchansky Caves Nativity of the Most Holy Mother of God Convent
2. Sofronievo-Molchansky Nativity of the Mother of God Monastery
3. St. Charalampias the Priest-Martyr's Convent
4. St. Nicholas's female metochion

=== Sumy Diocese ===
1. Okhtyrka Holy Trinity Monastery

== Ternopil Oblast ==
=== Kyiv Diocese ===
1. Pochayiv Holy Dormition Lavra

=== Ternopil Diocese ===
1. Kremenets Theophany Convent
2. Pochayiv Holy Spirit Monastery
3. Zahaytsi St. John the Almoner's Monastery

== Vinnytsia Oblast ==
=== Kyiv Diocese ===
1. Holy Trinity Stauropegial Convent
2. Pochayiv Icon of the Mother of God stauropegial female skete

=== Mohyliv-Podilskyi Diocese ===
1. Beheading of St. John 's Monastery
2. St. Nicholas's Monastery
3. Transfiguration Monastery
4. Holy Dormition Monastery
5. St. Michael the Archangel's Convent
6. Bar Icon of the Mother of God Convent
7. Brayiliv Holy Trinity Convent
8. Lemeshivka St. John the Theologian's Monastery

== Volyn Oblast ==
=== Kyiv Diocese (2) ===
1. St. Alexander Nevsky's stauropegial Convent
2. Zymne Svytohirsky Holy Dormition stauropegial Convent

=== Volodymyr-Volynsk Diocese ===
1. Myltsi St. Nicholas's Monastery
2. Nyzkynychi Holy Dormition Monastery
3. St. John the Forerunner's male skete
4. Svityaz Sts. Peter and Paul's Monastery

=== Volyn Diocese ===
1. Exaltation of Cross Monastery
2. Mikhnivka Meeting of the Lord Convent
3. Starosilye Holy Trinity Convent

== Zakarpattia Oblast ==
=== Khust Diocese ===
1. "Unexpected Joy" Icon of the Mother of God Monastery
2. Ascension Convent
3. Holy Trinity Convent
4. Holy Trinity Monastery
5. Hrusheve St. Michael the Archangel's Monastery
6. Nativity of the Most Holy Mother of God Convent
7. Protection of the Mother of God male skete]
8. St. Elijah's Monastery
9. St. Elijah's male skete
10. St. George's Monastery
11. St. John the Forerunner's Monastery (Bedevlya)
12. St. John the Forerunner's Monastery (Roztoky)
13. St. John the Theologian's Convent
14. St. Michael the Archangel's Convent
15. St. Nicholas's Monastery
16. St. Panteleimon's Monastery
17. St. Panteleimon's female skete
18. St. Seraphim's Convent
19. St. Sergius of Radonezh's Convent
20. St. Simeon's Monastery
21. St. Stephen's Monastery
22. Transfiguration Monastery
23. Uhlya Holy Dormition Convent

=== Mukachevo Diocese ===
1. Entry of the Mother of God Convent
2. Holy Dormition Convent
3. Holy Dormition Monastery
4. Kazan Icon of the Mother of God Monastery
5. Krasnohirskiy All Saints' Monastery
6. Mukachevo St. Nicholas's Convent
7. Pochayiv Icon of the Mother of God Monastery
8. Protection of the Mother of God Monastery
9. Protection of the Mother of God male skete
10. Protection of the Mother of God Monastery
11. Resurrection Monastery
12. St. George's Monastery]
13. St. John the Forerunner's Convent
14. St. John the Theologian's Monastery
15. St. Mary Magdalene the-Equal-to-the-Apostles's Convent
16. St. Panteleimon's Monastery
17. St. Seraphim's Convent
18. St. Vladimir the-Equal-to-the-Apostles' Monastery
19. Sts. Cyril and Methodius's Convent

== Zaporizhzhia Oblast ==
=== Berdyansk Diocese ===
1. Holy Dormition Convent
2. St. Ambrose of Optina's Monastery
3. St. Michael the Archangel's Convent
4. St. Seraphim's Convent

=== Zaporizhzhia Diocese ===
1. St. Elizabeth's Convent
2. St. John the Theologian's Convent
3. St. Nicholas's Convent
4. St. Sabbas the Sanctified's Monastery
5. Tikhvin Icon of the Mother of God female skete

== Zhytomyr Oblast ==
=== Kyiv Diocese ===
1. "Assuage My Sorrows" Icon of the Mother of God stauropegial Convent
2. Athos Icon of the Mother of God stauropegial Convent
3. Horodnytsya St. George's stauropegial Monastery
4. Iberian Icon of the Mother of God stauropegial female skete]
5. St. John the Russian's stauropegial male metochion
6. St. Silvanus the Athonite's stauropegial male skete
7. Zhytomyr St. Anastasia of Rome's stauropegial Convent

=== Ovruch Diocese ===
1. Kazan Icon of the Mother of God Monastery
2. St. Basil's Convent

=== Zhytomyr Diocese ===
1. Chervone Nativity of Christ Convent
2. Holy Mandylion Protection Convent
3. Tryhirya Transfiguration Monastery

== Sub-list of stauropegial monasteries ==
1. Korets Holy Trinity Stauropegial Convent, belongs directly to the Russian Orthodox Church
1. St. Paisius Velichkovsky's stauropegial Monastery (Autonomous Republic of Crimea)
2. Nativity of the Most Holy Mother of God Glinskaya Pustyn stauropegial Monastery (Sumy Oblast)
3. Pochayiv Holy Dormition Lavra (Ternopil Oblast)
4. Holy Trinity Stauropegial Convent (Vinnytsia Oblast)
5. Pochayiv Icon of the Mother of God stauropegial female skete (Vinnytsia Oblast)
6. St. Alexander Nevsky's stauropegial Convent (Volyn Oblast)
7. Zymne Svytohirsky Holy Dormition stauropegial Convent (Volyn Oblast)
8. "Assuage My Sorrows" Icon of the Mother of God stauropegial Convent (Zhytomyr Oblast)
9. Athos Icon of the Mother of God stauropegial Convent (Zhytomyr Oblast)
10. Horodnytsya St. George's stauropegial Monastery (Zhytomyr Oblast)
11. Iberian Icon of the Mother of God stauropegial female skete] (Zhytomyr Oblast)
12. St. John the Russian's stauropegial male metochion (Zhytomyr Oblast)
13. St. Silvanus the Athonite's stauropegial male skete (Zhytomyr Oblast)
14. Zhytomyr St. Anastasia of Rome's stauropegial Convent (Zhytomyr Oblast)

== Statistics ==
=== Monasteries by oblast ===
- Zakarpattia Oblast – 42
- Kyiv and Kyiv Oblast – 25
- Autonomous Republic of Crimea – 22
- Rivne Oblast – 20
- Odesa Oblast – 18
- Chernivtsi Oblast – 15
- Donetsk Oblast – 15
- Chernihiv Oblast – 12
- Zhytomyr Oblast – 12
- Cherkasy Oblast – 11
- Luhansk Oblast – 10
- Vinnytsia Oblast – 10
- Dnipropetrovsk Oblast – 9
- Khmelnytskyi Oblast – 9
- Volyn Oblast – 9
- Zaporizhia Oblast – 9
- Sumy Oblast – 6
- Kharkiv Oblast – 5
- Kherson Oblast – 5
- Poltava Oblast – 5
- Ternopil Oblast – 4
- Ivano-Frankivsk Oblast – 3
- Kirovohrad Oblast – 3
- Lviv Oblast – 2
- Mykolaiv Oblast – 2

=== Monasteries by eparchy (diocese) ===
- Kyiv – 39 (Kyiv–25, ARC–1, Sumy–1, Ternopil–1, Vinnytsia–2, Volyn–2, Zhytomyr–7)
- Khust – 23 (Zakarpattia)
- Mukachevo – 19 (Zakarpattia)
- Simferopol – 18 (ARC)
- Odesa – 16 (Odesa)
- Bukovina – 15 (Chernivtsi)
- Rivne – 14 (Rivne)
- Donetsk – 13 (Donetsk–12, Luhansk–1)
- Cherkasy – 8 (Cherkasy)
- Mohyliv-Podilskyi – 8 (Vinnytsia)
- Nizhyn – 7 (Chernihiv)
- Chernihiv – 5 (Chernihiv)
- Dnipro – 5 (Dnipropetrovsk)
- Khmelnytskyi – 5 (Khmelnytskyi)
- Bila Tserkva – 5 (Kyiv)
- Boryspil – 5 (Kyiv)
- Luhansk – 5 (Luhansk)
- Sarny – 5 (Rivne)
- Zaporizhia – 5 (Zaporizhia)
- Konotop – 4 (Sumy)
- Volodymyr-Volynskyi – 4 (Volyn)
- Berdiansk – 4 (Zaporizhia)
- Uman – 3 (Cherkasy)
- Horlivka – 3 (Donetsk)
- Ivano-Frankivsk – 3 (Ivano-Frankivsk)
- Izium – 3 (Kharkiv)
- Kherson – 3 (Kherson)
- Shepetivka – 3 (Khmelnytskyi)
- Severodonetsk – 3 (Luhansk)
- Poltava – 3 (Poltava)
- Ternopil – 3 (Ternopil)
- Volyn – 3 (Volyn)
- Zhytomyr – 3 (Zhytomyr)
- Feodosiya – 2 (ARC)
- Kamianske – 2 (Dnipropetrovsk)
- Kryvyi Rih – 2 (Dnipropetrovsk)
- Kharkiv – 2 (Kharkiv)
- Nova Kakhovka – 2 (Kherson)
- Oleksandriya – 2 (Kirovohrad)
- Lviv – 2 (Lviv)
- Mykolaiv – 2 (Mykolaiv)
- Balta – 2 (Odesa)
- Kremenchuk – 2 (Poltava)
- Ovruch – 2 (Zhytomyr)
- Dzhankoy – 1 (ARC)
- Kamianets-Podilskyi – 1 (Khmelnytskyi)
- Kropyvnytskyi – 1 (Kirovohrad)
- Rovenky – 1 (Luhansk)
- Sumy – 1 (Sumy)
- Moscow – 1 (Russian Orthodox Church)
