= Nikodim Krotkov =

Archbishop of the Russian Orthodox Church (1868–1938)

Nikodim
- Metropolis of Kiev and Galicia; Archbishop of Kostroma and Galich
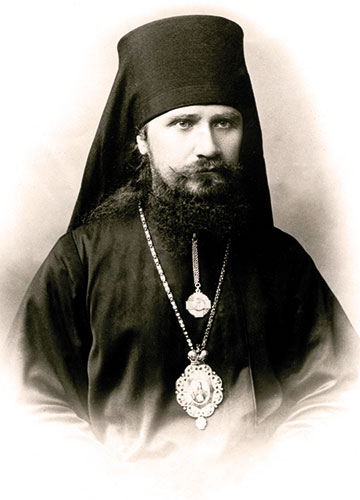
- Nikodim in 1908
- Church: Russian Orthodox Church
- See: Kiev and Galicia; Kostroma and Galich
- Installed: 7 February 1918
- Predecessor: Vladimir (Bogoyavlensky)
- Successor: Antony (Khrapovitsky)

Personal details
- Born: Nikolai Vasilyevich Krotkov; 29 November 1868 Pogreshino, Russian Empire (now Kostroma Oblast, Russia)
- Died: 21 August 1938 (aged 69) Yaroslavl, Yaroslavl Oblast, Russian SFSR, Soviet Union (now Russia)

Nikodim (Russian: Никодим; born Nikolai Vasilyevich Krotkov (Russian: Николай Васильевич Кротков); 29 November [O.S. 17 November] 1868 – 21 August 1938) was a bishop of the Russian Orthodox Church, later the Archbishop of Kostroma and Galich.

He christmated Pavlo Skoropadskyi as Hetman of Ukraine on 29 April 1918 in the Saint Sophia Cathedral. During the Revolutionary period in Ukraine 1917-1920 he served as a Metropolitan of Kiev and Galicia as a vicar to the murdered by Bolsheviks Metropolitan Vladimir. In 2000 he was recognized as a hieromartyr by the Russian Orthodox Church.

== Biography ==
Nikolai Vasilyevich Krotkov was born in a family of a Russian priest from the Kostroma Eparchy. In 1889 he graduated from the Kostroma Theological Seminary, after which Krotkov was appointed as a teacher to a parish school. In 1896 he enrolled into the Kiev Theological Academy and on 13 August 1899 Krotkov was tonsured as a monk. In 1900 Krotkov finished the academy with a degree of a Candidate in Theology. In 1905 he was a rector of the Pskov Theological Seminary.

On 11 November 1907 Nikodim was laid on of hands by Archbishop Anastasiy as bishop of Akkerman and vicar of Kishenev and Khotin Eparchy. Since 16 November 1911 he was a bishop of Chyhyryn, vicar of Kiev Eparchy. On 29 April 1918 Nikodim christmated Pavlo Skoropadsky as Hetman of Ukraine in the Saint Sophia Cathedral, after which he conducted a service of intercession at the Sofiyivska Ploshcha (Sophia Square). Nikodim was against adopting an autocephaly of the Ukrainian Orthodoxy. Since 1921 he was a bishop of Taurida and Simferopol. In 1922 Nikodim was promoted to the rank of archbishop. From 1922 to 1932 he spent time in prison. From 10 June 1932 to 2 January 1937 Nikodim was an archbishop of Kostroma, after which he retired. Later Nikodim was repressed and convicted again. He died in prison.
