= Smolensk Province (disambiguation) =

Smolensk Province was a province of Riga Governorate, Russia, 1713–1726.

Smolensk Province may also refer to:

- Smolensk Oblast, a federal subject of Russia
- Smolensk Governorate, an administrative division of the Russian Empire
