= Joasaph Leliukhin =

Metropolitan of Kiev (1903–1966)

Ioasaph
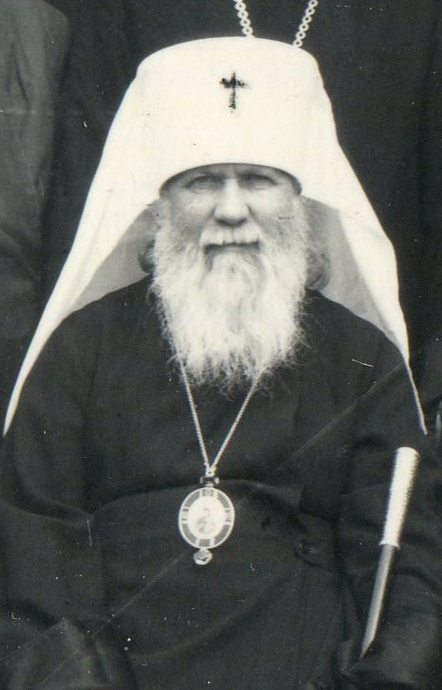
- Church: Russian Orthodox Church
- Metropolis: Metropolitan of Kiev, Galicia, Exarch of Ukraine
- See: Kiev
- Installed: 30 March 1964
- Term ended: 24 April 1966
- Predecessor: John Sokolov
- Successor: Filaret (Denysenko)
- Other posts: Bishop of Luhansk (temporarily); Bishop of Khmelnytskyi (temporarily); Bishop of Vinnytsia and Bar; Bishop of Dnipropetrovsk and Zaporizhia; Bishop of Sumy and Okhtyrka

Orders
- Ordination: 16 August 1942 by Dymitr (Magan)
- Consecration: 17 August 1958 by unknown

Personal details
- Born: Vitaliy Mikhailovich Leliukhin; 28 April 1903 Dubosyshche, Smolensk Province, Russian Empire
- Died: 24 April 1966 (aged 62) Kiev, Ukrainian SSR, USSR

Joasaph Leliukhin (born Vitaliy M. Lelyukhin, Russian: Вита́лий Миха́йлович Лелю́хин, 28 April 1903 – 24 April 1966) was the Metropolitan of Kiev and the Exarch of Ukraine in the Patriarchate of Moscow.

== Early life ==
Leliukhin was born in the village of Dubosyshche, which was then part of the Smolensk Province in the Russian Empire. After graduating from the Vyazma Theological School and then the Smolensk Theological Seminary, he began teaching before returning to complete his higher education at the Kharkiv branch of the Moscow Institute of Communications.

In 1942, he was ordained as a deacon and then a priest during the feast of the Dormition of the Mother of God.
