= Church of the Nativity of the Theotokos, Kryvyi Rih =

Ukrainian Orthodox church in Kryvyi Rih, Dnipopetrovsk, Ukraine

The Church of the Nativity of the All-holy Theotokos
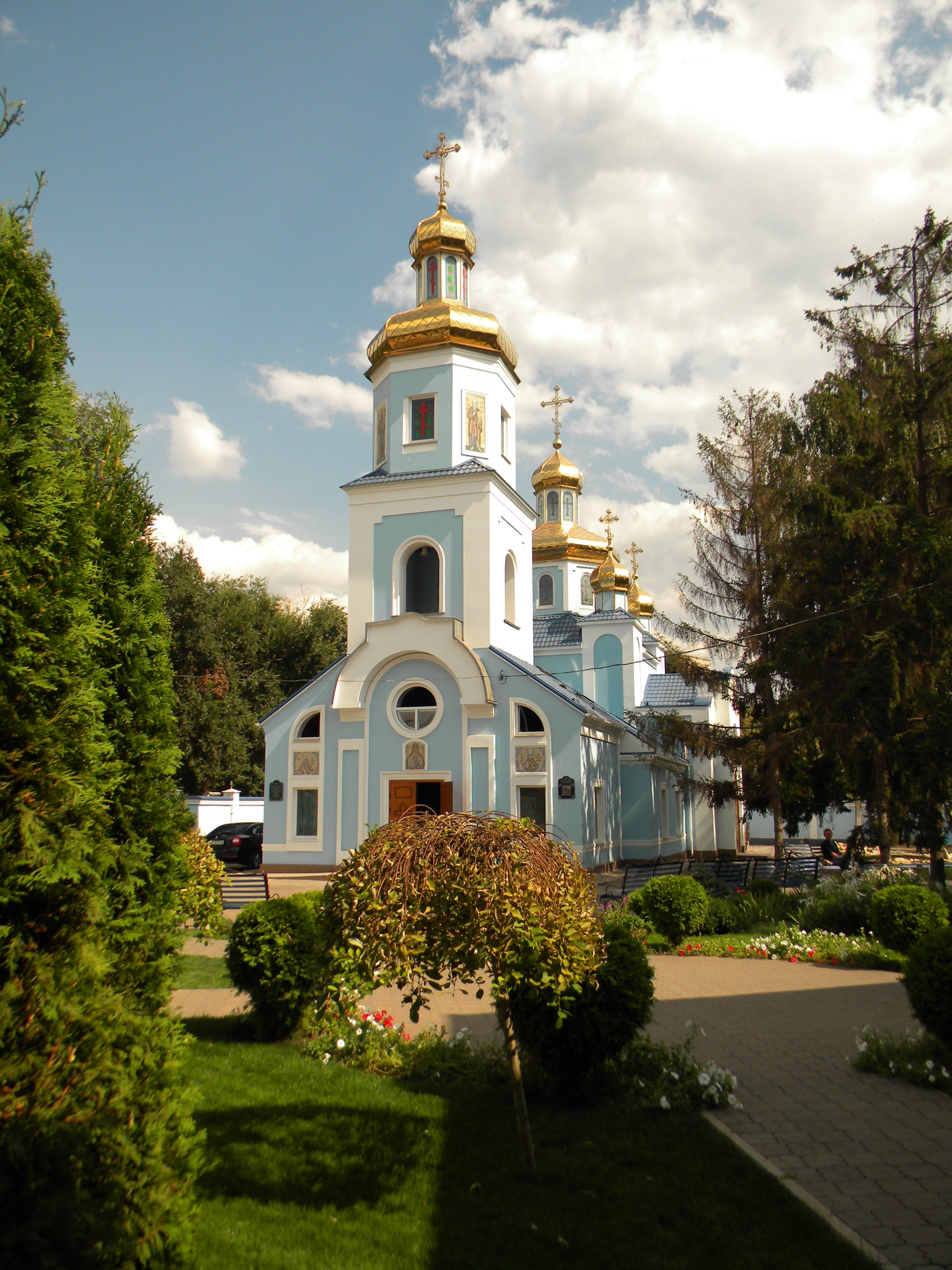
- Western facade
- The Church of the Nativity of the All-holy Theotokos
- 47°54′50″N 33°20′19″E
- Location: Kryvyi Rih
- Country: Ukraine
- Denomination: Ukrainian Orthodox Church (Moscow Patriarchate)
- Website: www.svecha.dp.ua

History
- Status: parish church
- Founded: 1886
- Founder: local rural society
- Dedication: Nativity of the All-holy Theotokos
- Dedicated: 21 September [O.S. 8 September]

Architecture
- Functional status: active
- Architectural type: Church
- Years built: 1886; 1997-2000 (bell tower); 2011 (rebuilt)

Administration
- Diocese: Eparchy of Kryvyi Rih

Clergy
- Rector: priest Vladimir Babura (1893–1907); priest Mikhail Pukhalsky (1907–18); archpriest Stefan Yanovsky (1941–58); archpriest Gavriil Bandurko (1958–61); archpriest Anatolii Ryzhenko (1991–pres.)

The Church of the Nativity of the All-holy Theotokos is a Ukrainian Orthodox Church (Moscow Patriarchate) church in the Kryvyi Rih diocese of the Ukrainian Orthodox Church (Moscow Patriarchate). It is one of the oldest churches in Kryvyi Rih.

== History ==
=== Foundation and early history ===
The church of the Nativity of the All-holy Theotokos in Kryvyi Rih was opened in 1886 by a local rural society as a prayer house. It was named for the birth of the Blessed Virgin Mary by Saints Joachim and Anne. Celebration of this feast day on 8 September (21 September new style) coincided in the folk calendar with the finishing of the main fieldworks and Harvest Thanksgiving. The street where the church was situated also was named after the Nativity of the Theotokos.

The church belonged to the Shyroke deanery in the Kherson uyezd of the Kherson Governorate of the Russian Empire. A parish of the church included 250 houses in Kryvyi Rih and also 2 villages in the neighbouring Yekaterinoslav Governorate – Shmakovo (Pokrovskoe) and Dubovaia Balka. It had nearly 2,700 people.

The clergy of the church consisted of a priest and a cantor-reader. There were also a churchwarden and a parish guardianship (since 1893) that together helped to the clergy with economic business. One of the parsons – priest Vladimir Babura – was a famous homilist and publicist in the country. His articles and collections of sermons were published in Odessa, Kyiv, Moscow and St. Petersburg.

Since 1897 there was a grammar school at the church that later received the status of a parochial school. There pupils studied Russian, calligraphy, arithmetic, religion, Slavonic reading and singing. In the beginning of the 20th century, there were 50 children studying at the school – 30 boys and 20 girls.

=== Soviet period ===
With the beginning of the Russian Revolution, parson priest Mikhail Pukhalsky was killed together with his wife Maria after three hours of torture in his parsonage at the churchyard in March 1918.

In 1922, Bolsheviks confiscated church items. During this period, the number of active parishioners was 540 persons in 1924. In 1929, the town executive committee received peasant's requests for turning the church into a rural club, and in 1930, the possibility of founding an antireligious university on its base was also considered. These plans failed, and the church was closed only in 1935. Later, it was refitted into a receiver-distributor for juvenile offenders and repressed parents’ children.

But even after the closing of the church, the Nativity of the Theotokos parish did not finish its existence. Services were held in a private house on 18 Kirov Street until 1938 when all clergy was repressed by agencies of the NKVD (the Peoples’ Commissariat for Internal Affairs in the Union of Soviet Socialistic Republics).

Only at the time of the German occupation could the congregation renew its church life. In December 1941, the faithful people were given a building of a primary school on 45 Shyrokovska Street, and after the Second World War they bought a house on 60 Lenin Street where they equipped a complete prayer house.

In this period, the parish had 4,000 members and was headed by archpriest Stefan Yanovsky, who was also the Dean of the Kryvyi Rih district of the Dnipropetrovs’k diocese. At this time the prayer house performed the function of the cathedral. It was in existence until Khrushchev's anti-religious campaign and was closed in 1961.

== Present ==
The church was reopened on 7 February 1991 when the process of giving back the complex of buildings to its former owners began. At that time, the forming of a new architectural ensemble of the church began: a central dome was installed in 1995; a bell tower was erected in 1997-2000; a spiritual enlightenment centre was built in 2001-2004; a churchyard was arranged and a church gate was built in 2006-2008; the church was reconstructed and its interior was totally renewed in 2010-2011; and the second building of the spiritual enlightenment centre was started in 2014.

With the restoration of the church, an active parish life began. Between 1991 and 2005, several parish activities were founded, such as a Sunday school, a church library, a parish newspaper, a charter of the Sisters of Mercy, a summer camp, an Orthodox youth brotherhood, and an annual festival of Ukrainian and church culture.

The largest feature of the parish today is the church's Sunday school. About 150 children study the Bible and religion in six classes. In the spiritual enlightenment centre, there are youth and two children's choirs along with art studio which have become laureates of All-Ukrainian and international festivals and competitions (in Ukraine, Russia, Poland and Serbia). Active publishing activity is also carried out. Publications range from studies about churches in Kryvyi Rih, educational programmes and methodological recommendations for Sunday schools, and a musical collection with hymns and songs for a choir outside of the Liturgy.

The architectural ensemble of the church became one of the "visiting cards" of the city for inhabitants and guests. Kryvyi Rih painters such as Ivan Avramenko, Dmytrii Grybok, Alexander Udovenko and Oksana Kolos found creative inspiration for their painting there.

Archpriest Anatolii Ryzhenko has been the parson of the church since 1991. Since the moment the church was restored, twenty natives from the congregation have become clergymen (of which two are monks).

== Sources ==
- Божко А. А. Храм Рождества Пресвятой Богородицы (1886—2012): Исторический очерк / Алексей Алексеевич Божко. — Кривой Рог, 2012. — 84 с., ил.
- Божко О.О. «Благочестиваго корене пречестная отрасль…»: з життя настоятеля Різдво-Богородичного храму Кривого Рогу священика Володимира Бабури // Актуальні проблеми соціально-гуманітарних наук. Матер. ІІІ всеукр. наук. конфер. з міжнар. участю (м. Дніпропетровськ, 20 грудня 2013 р.): у 5-х частинах. — Д.: ТОВ «Інновація», 2013. — ч. 4. — С.50–54.
- Божко О. Літературна діяльність настоятеля Різдво-Богородичного храму м. Кривий Ріг священика Володимира Бабури в журналі «Друг трезвости». Сайт храму Різдва Пресвятої Богородиці.
- Божко О. Публікації криворізького священика Володимира Бабури на сторінках московського журналу «Душеполезное чтение». Сайт храму Різдва Пресвятої Богородиці.
- Митрофан (Божко), ієрод. Співпраця криворізького священика Володимира Бабури зі столичним журналом «Православно-Русское Слово». Сайт храму Різдва Пресвятої Богородиці.
- Божко О.О. Життя і мученицька кончина криворізького священика Михаїла Пухальського (†1918) // Сучасні соціально-гуманітарні дискурси: Матер. IV Всеукр. наук. конфер. з міжнар. участю. (м. Дніпропетровськ, 22 березня 2014 р.): у 3-х частинах. – Д.: ТОВ «Інновація», 2014. – ч. 3. – С. 12–15.
- Божко О.О. Кривий Ріг у архіпастирському служінні священномученика Онуфрія (Гагалюка) // Гуманітарний журнал. — 2010. — №3–4. — С.107–112.
- Митрофан (Божко), ієром. Закриття і знищення храмів та молитовних споруд у Кривому Розі під час хрущовської антирелігійної кампанії 1958–1964 рр. // Церква мучеників: гоніння на віру та Церкву у ХХ столітті: матеріали Міжнар. наук. конф. (К., 6–7 лютого 2020 р.) / упоряд. С.В. Шумило; відп. ред. прот. В. Савельєв. — К.: Видавничий відділ Української Православної Церкви, 2020. — С.550–563.
