= John Sokolov =

John
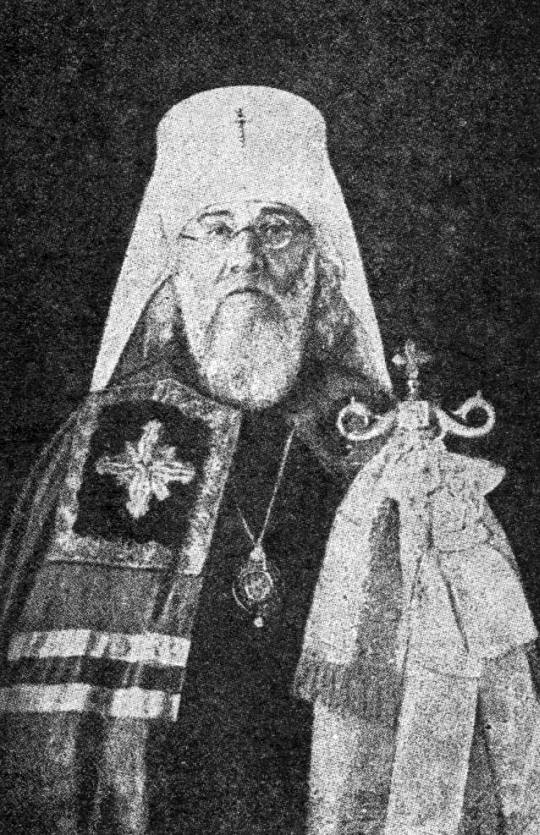
- Church: Russian Orthodox Church
- Metropolis: Metropolitan of Kiev and Galicia, Exarch of Ukraine
- See: Kiev
- Installed: 12 February 1944
- Term ended: 30 March 1964
- Predecessor: Nicholas (as exarch)
- Successor: Joasaph
- Other posts: Archbishop of Yaroslavl and Rostov; Archbishop of Ulyanovsk; Archbishop of Arkhangelsk and Kholmogory

Orders
- Ordination: 1901
- Consecration: 12 October 1928 by unknown

Personal details
- Born: Ivan Aleksandrovich Sokolov; 13 January 1877 Dmitrov, Moscow Governorate, Russian Empire
- Died: 29 March 1968 (aged 91) Sviatoshyn, Ukrainian SSR, USSR

John Sokolov (Russian: Иоа́нн; born Ivan Aleksandrovich Sokolov Russian: Ива́н Алекса́ндрович Соколо́в) was the Metropolitan of Kiev and the Exarch of Ukraine in the Patriarchate of Moscow.
