= Eparchy of Kryvyi Rih =

Orthodox diocese in Ukraine

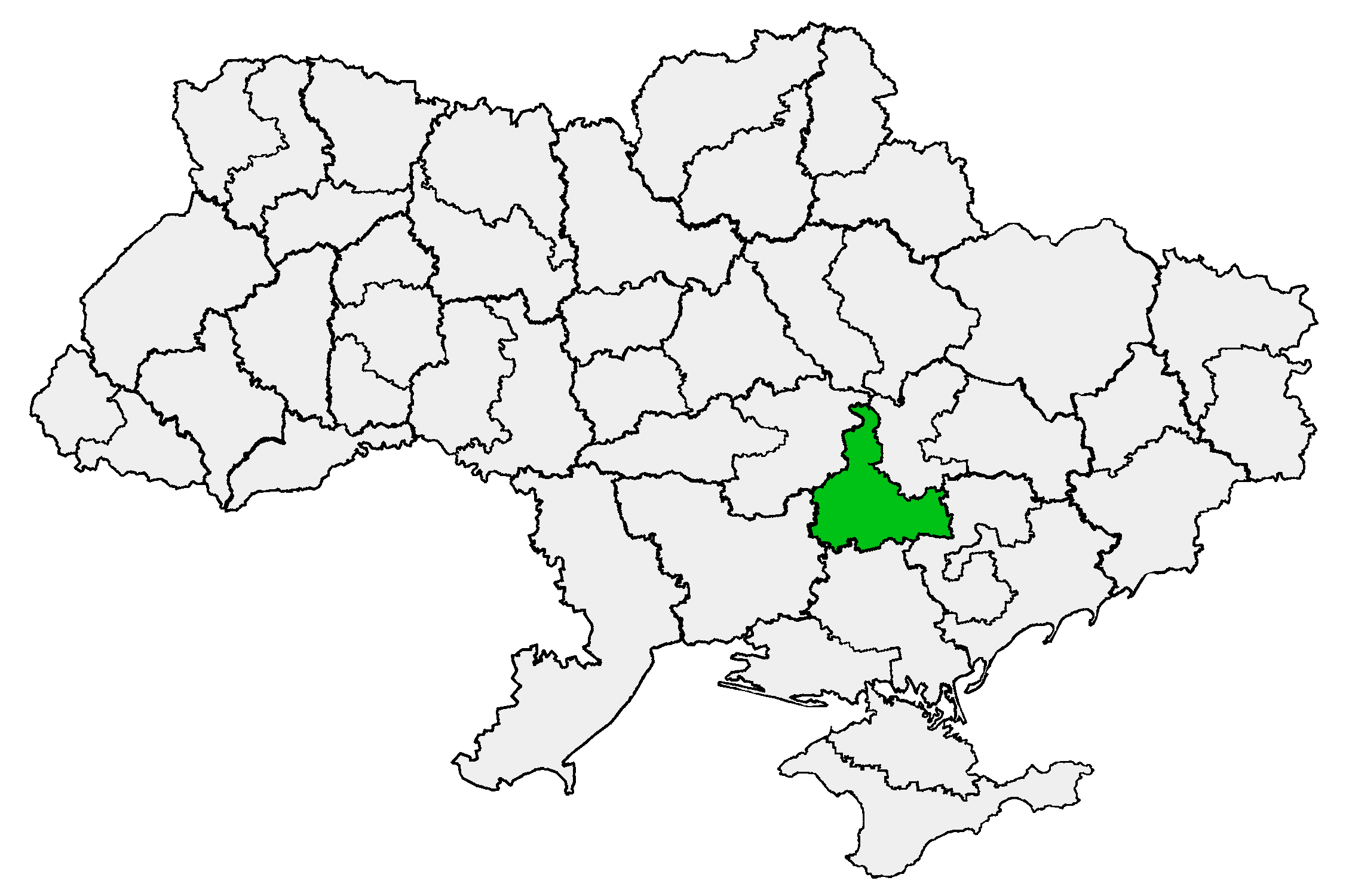

Location
- Territory: Central and southern Ukraine
- Headquarters: Kryvyi Rih, Ukraine

Information
- Denomination: Eastern Orthodox
- Sui iuris church: Ukrainian Orthodox Church (Moscow Patriarchate)
- Established: 1996
- Language: Church Slavonic; Russian; Ukrainian

Current leadership
- Bishop: Archbishop Ephraim

Website
- eparhia.com.ua

Kryvyi Rih and Nikopol diocese - Eparchy of the Ukrainian Orthodox Church (Moscow Patriarchate) centered in Kryvyi Rih, Ukraine. Cathedral city - Kryvyi Rih. Cathedral - Spaso-Preobrazhensky (Kryvyi Rih), Transfiguration (Nikopol).

Founded on 27 July 1996, by decision of the Holy Synod of the Ukrainian Orthodox Church, of the release of the Dnipropetrovsk diocese. Decision of the Holy Synod on 12 September 1996 by Bishop Kryvyi Rih and Nikopol was defined as Archimandrite Ephraim, inhabitants of Kiev-Pechersk Lavra.

For ten years, the number of parishes in the territory of the diocese increased from 85 to 224, and clergy from 98 to 202.

== Churches ==
The oldest churches in the cathedral city of Kryvyi Rih diocese are:

- church of St. Nicolas in Kryvyi Rih (1761);
- church of St. Michael in Kryvyi Rih (1793);
- church of the Nativity of the Theotokos (1886);
- church of the Protection of the Most Blessed Virgin Mary (1888);
- church of the Ascension of the Lord (1904).
