= Macarius Nevsky =

- Metropolitan and archbishop of Moscow
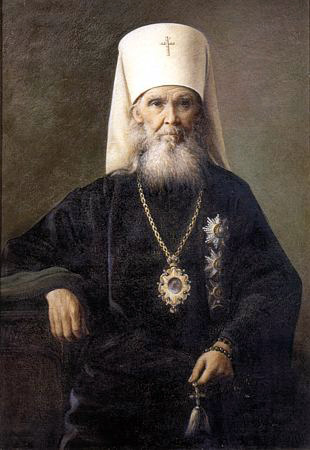
- Macarius in 1915
- Church: Russian Orthodox Church
- See: Moscow
- Installed: 1912
- Term ended: 1917
- Predecessor: Vladimir Bogoyavlensky
- Successor: Patriarch Tikhon of Moscow

Personal details
- Born: 1 October 1835 Shapkino, Vladimir Governorate
- Died: 2 March 1926 (aged 90) Kotelniki, Moscow Governorate

Metropolitan Macarius (Russian: Митрополит Макарий, secular name Mikhail Andreyevich Nevsky, Russian: Михаил Андреевич Невский; 1 October 1835 – 2 March 1926) was the Metropolitan of Moscow and Kolomna from 1912 to 1917, an outstanding missionary and enlightener of the masses in the Altai region (people used to call him the "Siberian pillar of Orthodoxy" and "Apostle of the Altai").

== Life ==
Born to a family of a sexton, Macarius graduated from a theological seminary in Tobolsk (1854) and joined the Altai Mission, which had been set up by the Most Holy Synod with the purpose of converting the people of the Altay region to Christianity.

In 1861, Macarius took monastic vows and was ordained a hieromonk (monastic priest). From 1861 to 1864, he was busy restoring the Chulyshmansky Monastery to a normal state. In 1868–1869, Macarius lived in Kazan and worked on the grammar of the Altai language, publishing a number of divine service books in this language. In 1883, he was appointed head of the Altai Holy Mission and raised to the dignity of archmandrite, and then consecrated as Bishop of Biysk and vicar of the Tomsk eparchy. In 1891, Macarius was named Bishop of Tomsk and Semipalatinsk. In 1905, he became the Bishop of Tomsk and Barnaul (later, archbishop). In 1908, Macarius was appointed Archbishop of Tomsk and Altay.

In 1912, he was summoned to Moscow by the Holy Synod and elected Metropolitan of Moscow and Kolomna, also becoming thereby a member of the Holy Governing Synod. In 1913, Macarius became an honorable member of the St Petersburg Theological Academy. On March 20 of 1917, he retired from his post and was sent to Nikolo-Ugreshsky Monastery. Three years later, Metropolitan Tikhon bestowed upon Macarius the honorable lifelong title of Metropolitan of the Altai. Macarius died in 1926.

In 1956, Macarius' remains were transferred to Sergiyev Posad and placed under the Dormition Cathedral of the Trinity-St. Sergius Lavra.

Preceded by Vladimir (Petrov)	Bishop of Biysk; 1884-1891	Succeeded by Vladimir (Senkovsky)
Preceded by Isaac (Polozhensky)	Archbishop of Tomsk; 1891-1912	Succeeded by Methodius (Gerasimov)
Preceded by Vladimir (Bogoyavlensky)	Metropolitan of Moscow; 1912-1917	Succeeded by Tikhon (Bellavin)
