= Michael Voslenski =

Soviet dissident (1920–1997)

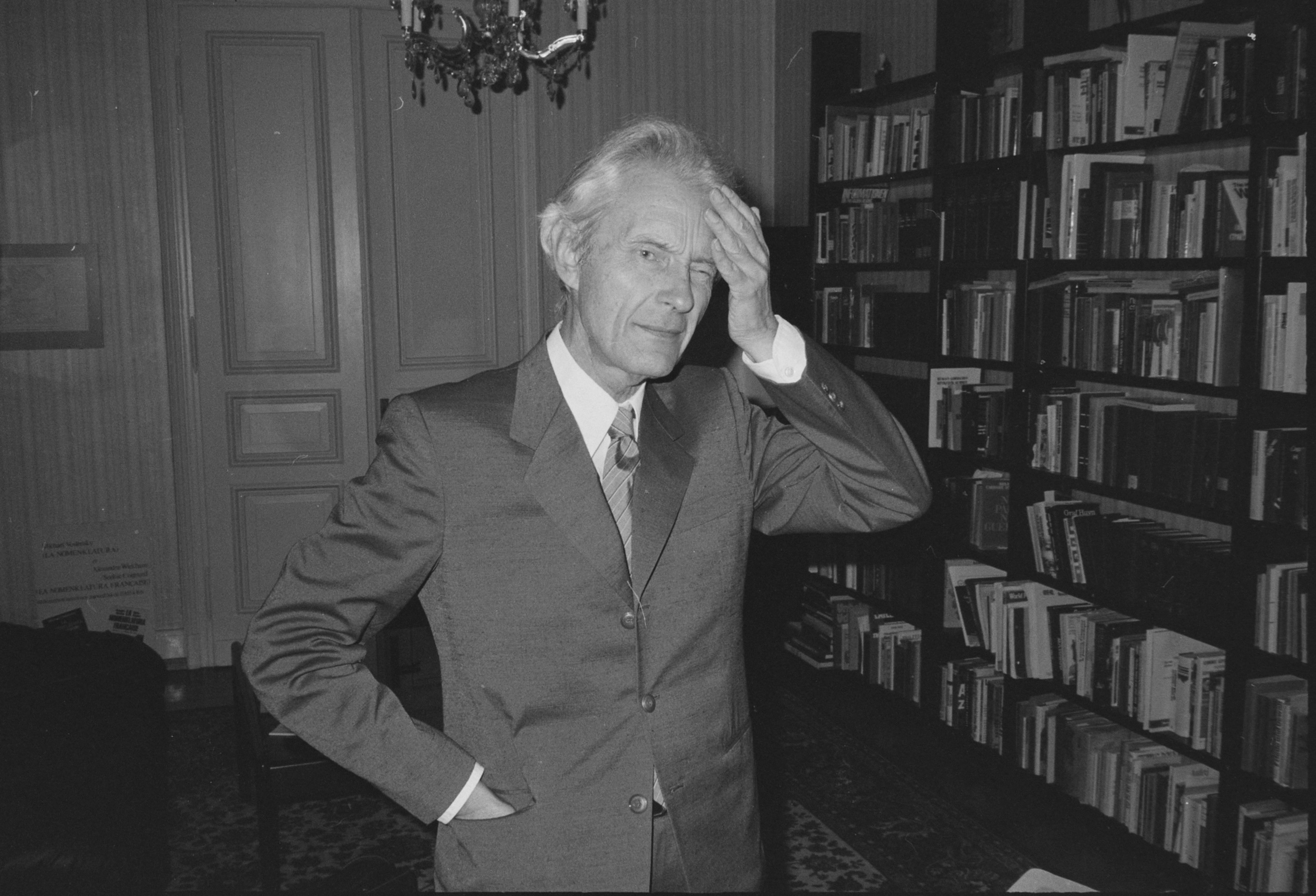
Michael Voslensky (1988)

Mikhail Sergeyevich Voslensky (Russian: Михаил Серге́евич Восленский) (December 6, 1920, Berdyansk, Ukrainian SSR – February 8, 1997, Bonn, Germany) was a Soviet writer, scientist, diplomat and dissident who authored the book Nomenklatura: The Soviet Ruling Class, about the Soviet nomenklatura, translated into 14 languages and printed in multiple editions.

Voslensky was an interpreter for the Soviet Union during the Nuremberg Trials. In 1953-1955 he worked with the World Peace Council. Later he worked at the Soviet Academy of Sciences.

In 1974, after 4 years of living in West Germany, he was stripped of his Soviet citizenship (restored in 1990) and worked with the Forschungsinstitut für Sowjetische Gegenwart (Research Institute for the Soviet Union).

His book Nomenklatura was motivated by Milovan Djilas's concept of a New Class emerging in communist states.

His book Secrets Revealed: Moscow Archives Speak sketches the role of terror in the Soviet system, the evolution of the Soviet secret police, and the role of the nomenklatura in its hierarchy.

== Bibliography ==
- Michael Voslensky (1984). Nomenklatura: The Soviet Ruling Class (1st ed.). Doubleday. ISBN 0-385-17657-0.
- Michael Voslensky (1984). Nomenklatura: Anatomy of the Soviet Ruling Class (1st ed.). The Bodley Head Ltd, London. ISBN 0-370-30471-3.
  - Russian original was written in 1970, distributed by samizdat, and eventually printed as Восленский М.С., Номенклатура. Господствующий класс Советского Союза. М., 1991.
  - German: Nomenklatura : der herrschende Klasse der Sowjetunion
    - Wien, Molden, 1980
    - Munchen, Moewig, 1982, ISBN 3-8118-3143-7
    - Molden, 1984, ISBN 3-88919-027-8
  - La nomenklatura, les privilégiés en URSS, Paris, 1980. (in French)
- Восленский М. С. Из истории политики США в германском вопросе (1918–1919 гг.). М., 1954. (in Russian)
- Das Geheime wird offenbar. Moskauer Archive erzählen. 1917-1991. , Langen Müller 1995, ISBN 3-7844-2536-4 ("Secrets Revealed: Moscow Archives Speak") (in German)
- Sterbliche Götter: die Lehrmeister der Nomenklatura, Erlangen Straube, 1989, ISBN 3-927491-11-X
