= Smolensk Province =

Russian subdivision

Smolensk Province (Russian: Смоле́нская прови́нция) was a province of Riga Governorate, Russian Empire.

The province was created in 1708 when Smolensk Governorate was abolished with its territory divided between Moscow and Riga Governorates. The province was abolished in 1726, when Smolensk Governorate was re-instated.
