= Vladimir Bogoyavlensky =

Bishop of the Russian Orthodox Church, Hieromartyr

- Metropolitan and archbishop of Moscow
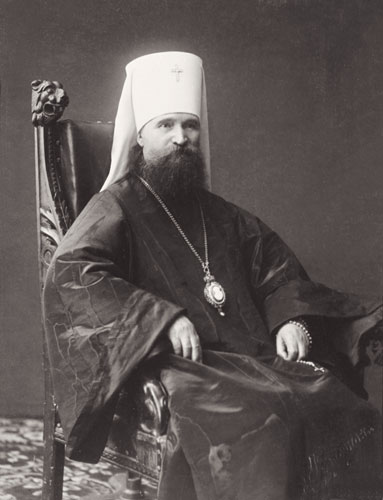
- Bogoyavlensky in the 1910s
- Church: Russian Orthodox Church
- See: Moscow
- Installed: 1898
- Term ended: 1912
- Predecessor: Sergius I, Metropolitan of Moscow
- Successor: Macarius (Nevsky)

Personal details
- Born: Vasily Nikiforovich Bogoyavlensky; 1 January 1848 Tambov Governorate, Russian Empire
- Died: 7 February 1918 (aged 70) Kyiv, Ukraine

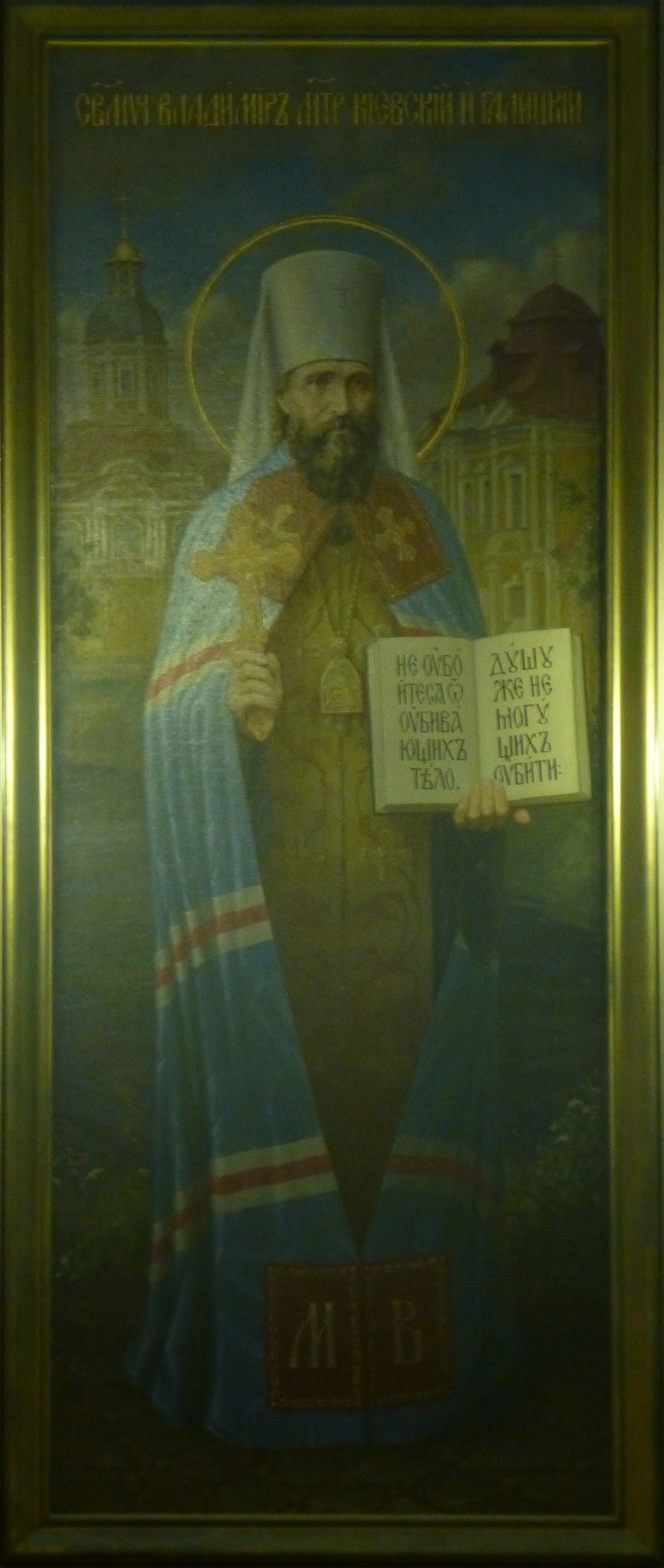
Icon of St. Vladimir of Kiev and Gallich at the Alexander Nevsky Lavra in Saint Petersburg

Vladimir (Russian: Владимир), baptismal name: Vasily Nikiforovich Bogoyavlensky (Russian: Василий Никифорович Богоявленский; 1 January 1848 – 7 February [O.S. 25 January] 1918), was a bishop of the Russian Orthodox Church. He was appointed to the position of Metropolitan of Moscow and Kolomna between 1898 and 1912, Metropolitan of St. Petersburg and Ladoga between 1912 and 1915, and the Metropolitan of Kiev and Galicia between 1915 and 1918. Murdered by Bolshevik soldiers in 1918, Metropolitan Vladimir was glorified as a Hieromartyr by the Russian Orthodox Church in 1992.

He was Chairman (the leading member) of the Most Holy Synod (1912–1917).

== Priesthood ==
Born to a family of a clergyman in Tambov Governorate, Vasili Bogoyavlensky graduated from a seminary in Tambov and Kiev Theological Academy. He then returned to Tambov to teach at his alma mater. In 1882, Vasili was ordained a priest in a town of Kozlov in Tambov Guberniya. On the death of his wife and child in 1886, he was tonsured (took monastic vows) being given the religious name of Vladimir, and was appointed igumen (abbot) of the Trinity Monastery in that same town.

== Bishop of Samara and Stavropol ==
In 1888, Igumen Vladimir was sent to St Petersburg as a vicar to assist the Metropolitan and was thereafter consecrated as a bishop. He was soon assigned to preach in Samara. When the country was afflicted by the epidemic of cholera and crop failure, he called upon the clergy and laity to help the needy and often conducted moliebens himself, beseeching the Lord to deliver people from calamities.

For six years, from 1892, Vladimir administered the Georgian Exarchate, paying special attention to the spiritual enlightenment of the multiethnic Orthodox population of the Caucasus, and opening new churches and parish schools.

== Metropolitan of Moscow and Kolomna ==
In 1898, Bishop Vladimir was summoned to Moscow where he was appointed Metropolitan of Moscow. During the events of October 1905, Metropolitan Vladimir wrote an address entitled, "What should we do during these troubled days?" (Что нам делать в эти тревожные наши дни?) and ordered that it be read aloud to the people in all of the churches in and around Moscow. In this address, he told the people of Moscow about the "criminal" and "anti-Christian" intentions of those who had compiled The Protocols of the Elders of Zion. Metropolitan Vladimir's address made a huge impression on those who confessed Russian Orthodoxy. He himself read his speech in the Assumption Cathedral of the Moscow Kremlin. Assessing the Protocols, Vladimir directly associated its authors' "monstrous" intentions with the revolutionary events in Russia, examining the then-ongoing social disturbance in Russian society from a religious, not political, point of view. He urged the Eastern Orthodox people to stand up against the Anti-Christ.

== Metropolitan of St. Petersburg and Ladoga ==
Upon the death of the Metropolitan Anthony of Saint Petersburg in 1912, Metropolitan Vladimir was chosen to fill this post. His successful career in this city, however, came to an end because he had been criticizing Grigori Rasputin's influence on the Church.

== Metropolitan of Kiev and Galich ==
In December 1915, Vladimir was sent away to Kiev. He was Metropolitan of Kiev and Gallich from 1915 to 1918. A few months after the October Revolution, Metropolitan Vladimir was arrested by five Red Army soldiers on 7 February [O.S. 25 January] 1918 when the army of Muravyov swept through Ukraine and in front of his monks he was immediately executed and his body mutilated.

Metropolitan Vladimir was glorified (canonized) as a saint by the Russian Orthodox Church in 1992. His feast day is celebrated on January 25, the date of his martyrdom. The Russian Orthodox Church follows the traditional Julian Calendar in determining feast day; currently, January 25 falls on February 7 of the modern Gregorian Calendar. He was the first bishop to suffer as a New Martyr under the Soviets.

== See also ==
- List of unsolved murders (1900–1979)

| Preceded by Flavian (Gorodetsky) | Metropolitan of Kiev and Gallich; 1915–1918 | Succeeded by Anthony (Khrapovitsky) |
