= Saint Sophia Cathedral, Kyiv =

Cathedral in Kyiv, Ukraine

Coordinates: 50°27′10″N 30°30′52″E

- Софійський собор
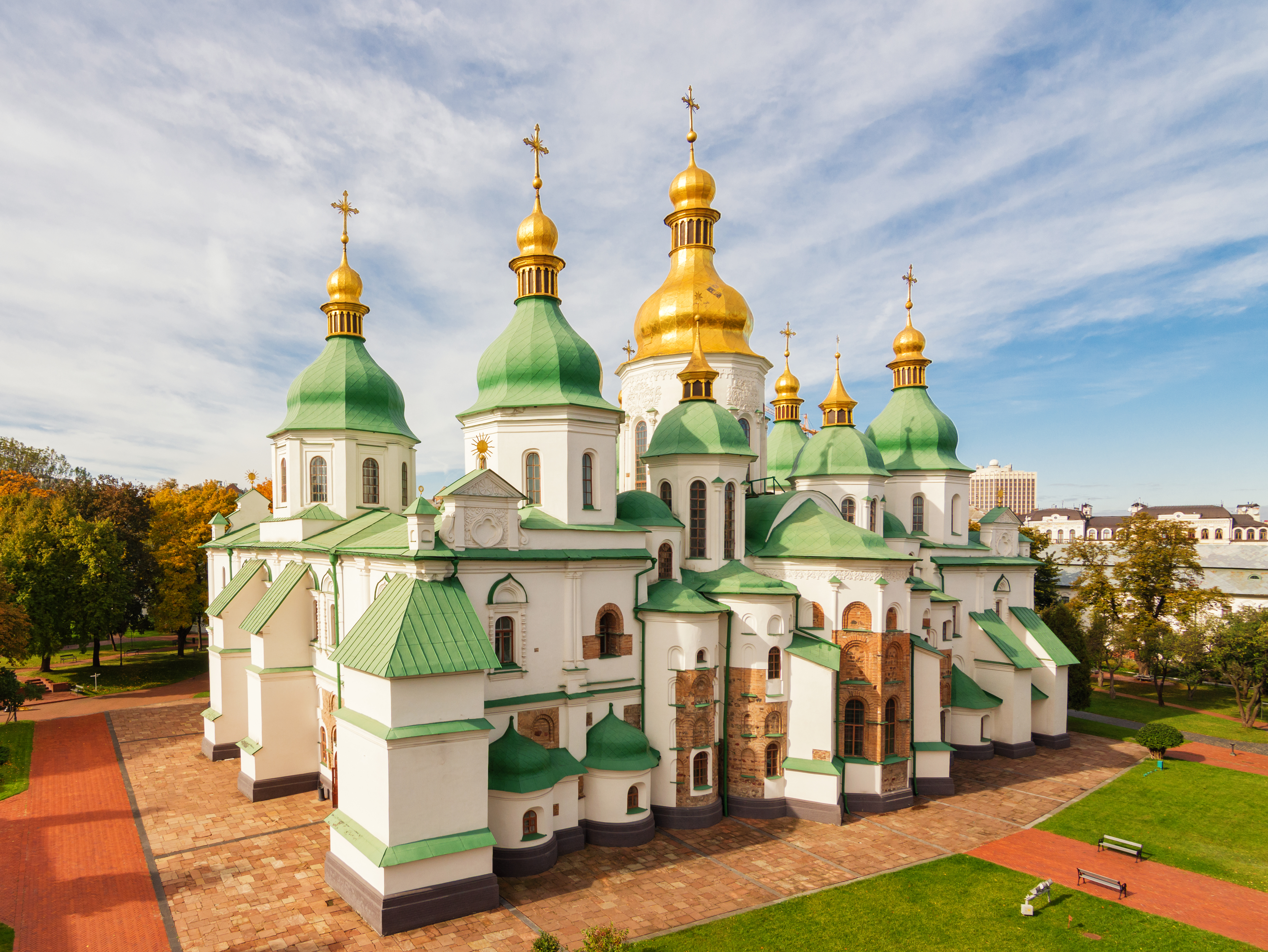
- Interactive fullscreen map
- Location: Shevchenkivskyi District, Kyiv
- Country: Ukraine
- Website: sofiia-kyivska.ua

History
- Dedication: Holy Wisdom (Hagia Sophia)

Architecture
- Style: Byzantine architecture, Ukrainian Baroque
- Years built: 11th century

Specifications
- Length: 41.7 m (137 ft)
- Width: 54.6 m (179 ft)

UNESCO World Heritage Site
- Official name: Saint-Sophia Cathedral
- Part of: Kyiv: Saint-Sophia Cathedral and Related Monastic Buildings, Kyiv-Pechersk Lavra
- Criteria: i, ii, iii, iv
- Reference: 527
- Inscription: 1990 (14th Session)
- Endangered: 2023

Immovable Monument of National Significance of Ukraine
- Official name: Софійський собор (Saint Sophia Cathedral)
- Type: Architecture, History, Monumental Art
- Reference no.: 260072/1-Н

The Saint Sophia Cathedral (Ukrainian: Софійський собор, romanized: Sofiiskyi sobor or Софія Київська, Sofiia Kyivska) in Kyiv, Ukraine is an architectural monument of Kyivan Rus'. The former cathedral is one of the city's best known landmarks and the first heritage site in Ukraine to be inscribed on the World Heritage List along with the Kyiv Cave Monastery complex. The World Heritage Committee of UNESCO decided in June 2013 that Kyiv Pechersk Lavra, and St Sophia Cathedral along with its related monastery buildings would remain on the World Heritage List. Aside from its main building, the cathedral includes an ensemble of supporting structures such as a bell tower and the House of Metropolitan.

In 2011 the historic site was reassigned from the jurisdiction of the Ministry of Regional Development of Ukraine to the Ministry of Culture of Ukraine. One of the reasons for the move was that both Saint Sophia Cathedral and Kyiv Pechersk Lavra are recognized by the UNESCO World Heritage Program as one complex, while in Ukraine the two were governed by different government entities. The cathedral is a museum.

The complex of the cathedral is the main component and museum of the National Reserve "Sophia of Kyiv" which is the state institution responsible for the preservation of the cathedral complex as well as four other historic landmarks across the nation.

== History ==
=== Early years ===
The Saint Sophia Cathedral (often referred to as St Sophia's Cathedral) was built as a metropolitan cathedral for Kyiv during the reign of Yaroslav the Wise. An earlier wooden church with the same name may have existed. According to the historian Volodymyr Berezhynsky, the cathedral was founded on the site of the battlefield where Yaroslav's Kievan Rus' army defeated the nomadic Pechenegs in 1036 following the that year's siege of Kyiv.

==== Foundation date ====
The limited and contradictory nature of the evidence for the cathedral's origins has caused its foundation and construction dates to be contested. The exact dates theorised by researchers have for many years been based on four sources—the Primary Chronicle (also known as The Tale of Bygone Years), The First Chronicle of Novgorod, the Chronicle of Thietmar of Merseburg, and the Sermon on Law and Grace. The most reliable of these sources, The Tale of Bygone Years, states that the cathedral was founded in 1037, but some scholars have interpreted this as being the year of completion. The chronicle states that in 1037, “…Yaroslavl founded a great city . . . [he] also founded the church of St. Sophia, a metropolitan [church]." The Novgorod Chronicle gives 1017 as being the foundation year of the cathedral: “In the year [1017] Yaroslav founded a great city Kyiv, and put up golden gates, and founded the church of St. Sophia." This is in comparison with the Primary Chronicle's entry for 1017: “Yaroslavl entered Kiev, and churches burned down.” A third date is provided by Thietmar of Merseburg, who wrote that Prince Boleslaw was present at the cathedral in 1018.

An alternative theory for the foundation date has been proposed by the Ukrainian historian Nadiia Nikitenko. According to Nikitenko, the cathedral was founded in 1011, under the reign of Yaroslav's father, Vladimir the Great, the Grand Prince of Kyiv. Her hypothesis, which suggests that the cathedral was founded on 4 November 1011 and was consecrated on 11 May 1018, is based on a new interpretation of painted images and graffiti on the cathedral walls dated by Nikitenko to between 1018 and 1036.

The 1011 date has been accepted by both UNESCO and the Ukrainian government, which officially celebrated the 1000th anniversary of the cathedral during 2011.

=== Medieval period ===
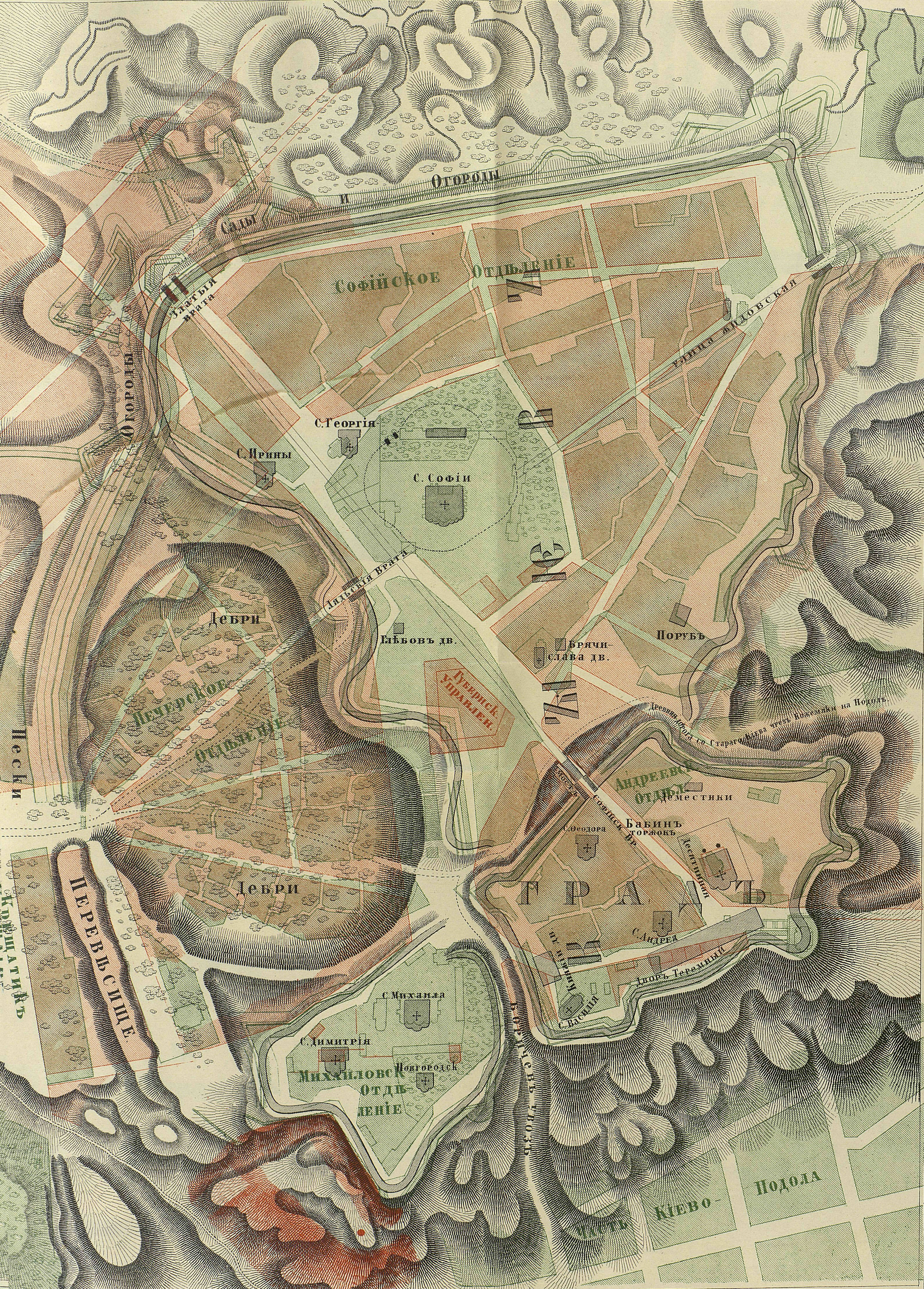
Nikolai Zakrevsky, A detail of the "Plan of Old Kyiv" from Description of Kyiv (1868)

The cathedral was designed as a burial place for Yaroslav the Wise and his descendants. He was interred in a marble sarcophagus, now located in the northern inner gallery. It is probable that the metropolitan bishops of Kyiv were also buried in the cathedral (prior to the absorption of the Kyivan Rus' lands into the Mongol Empire), the earliest known example being the burial of Cyril II in the 1280s. The tombs of other Grand Princes of Kiev known to have been buried in the cathedral have not survived, such as those of Vsevolod I (reigned 1078–1093), Vladimir II Monomakh (reigned 1113–1125), and Viacheslav I (reigned 1154).

In 1169, Kyiv was sacked after its capture by the troops of Andrey Bogolyubsky of Vladimir-Suzdal, who looted the cathedral's relics and other treasures, and in particular the icon of the Mother of God. In November 1240, Kyiv was besieged by the Mongols under the leadership of Batu Khan. St Sophia was damaged but not destroyed by the Mongols; like other city churches, it was looted when Kyiv was plundered by the victors. The city did not recover its former importance or prosperity for centuries following the Mongol invasion of Kievan Rus'. In 1203 the city was captured by Roman the Great, and the cathedral was robbed by Anna II of Kiev (the wife of Rurik Rostislavich) and their allies.

During the decline of Kyiv, the cathedral continued as a metropolitan church, but the building slowly became dilapidated, and the western end in particular suffered from years of neglect.

Most modern scholars believe that the first chronicle from Kyivan Rus' emerged in the 1030s and probably originated from St Sophia. Only later did chronicle writing in Ukraine move to the Kyiv Pechersk Lavra. The first Kyivan Rus' library was established in the cathedral by Yaroslav the Wise in 1037. It is known that there were over 1000 books in the collection, which was maintained by the cathedral's monks. According to one story, the monks hid the library's most valuable treasures in a secret underground passage when the city was being attacked—the hidden location has never been discovered, despite numerous attempts.

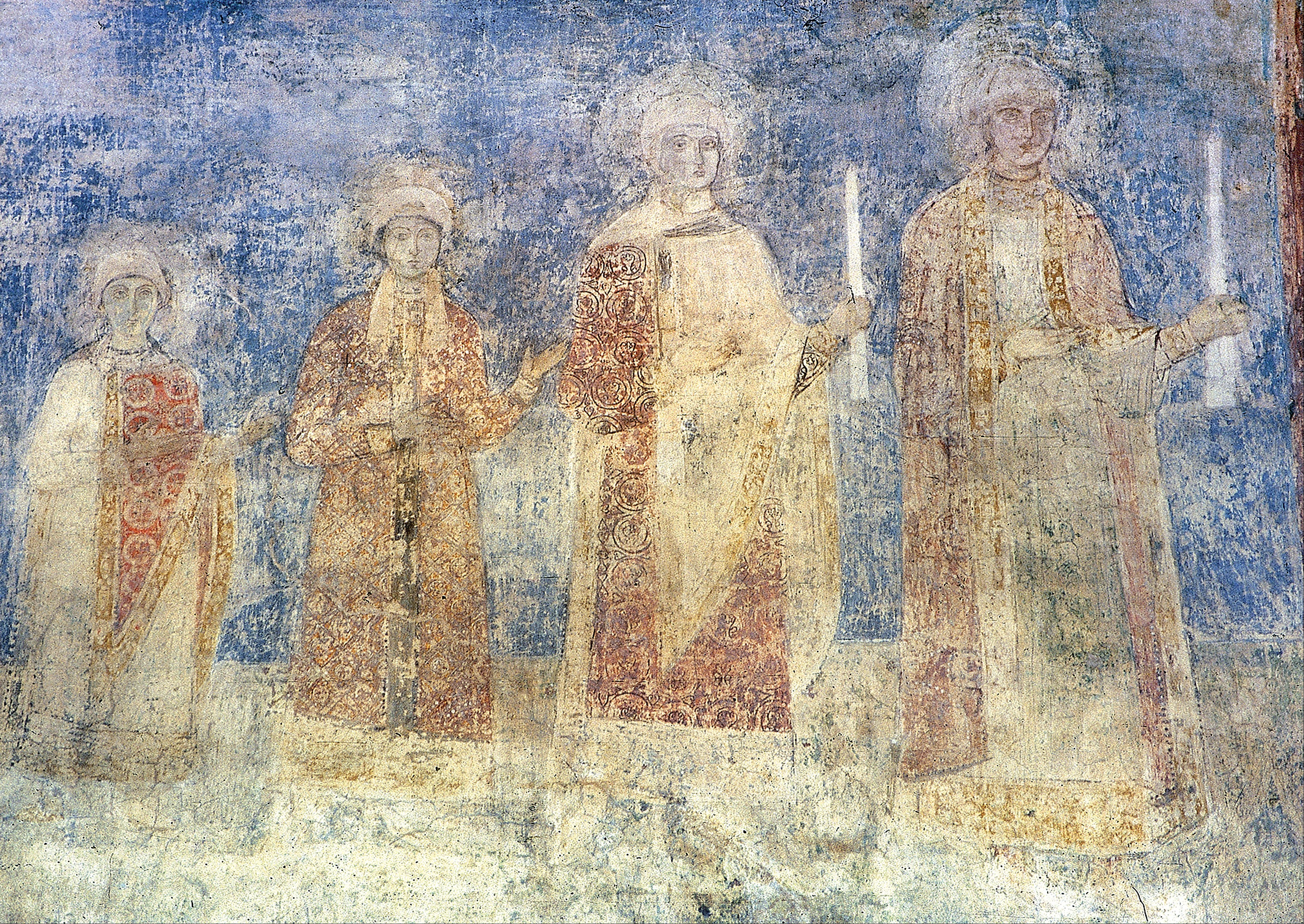
A Princely group portrait (south wall of the nave)

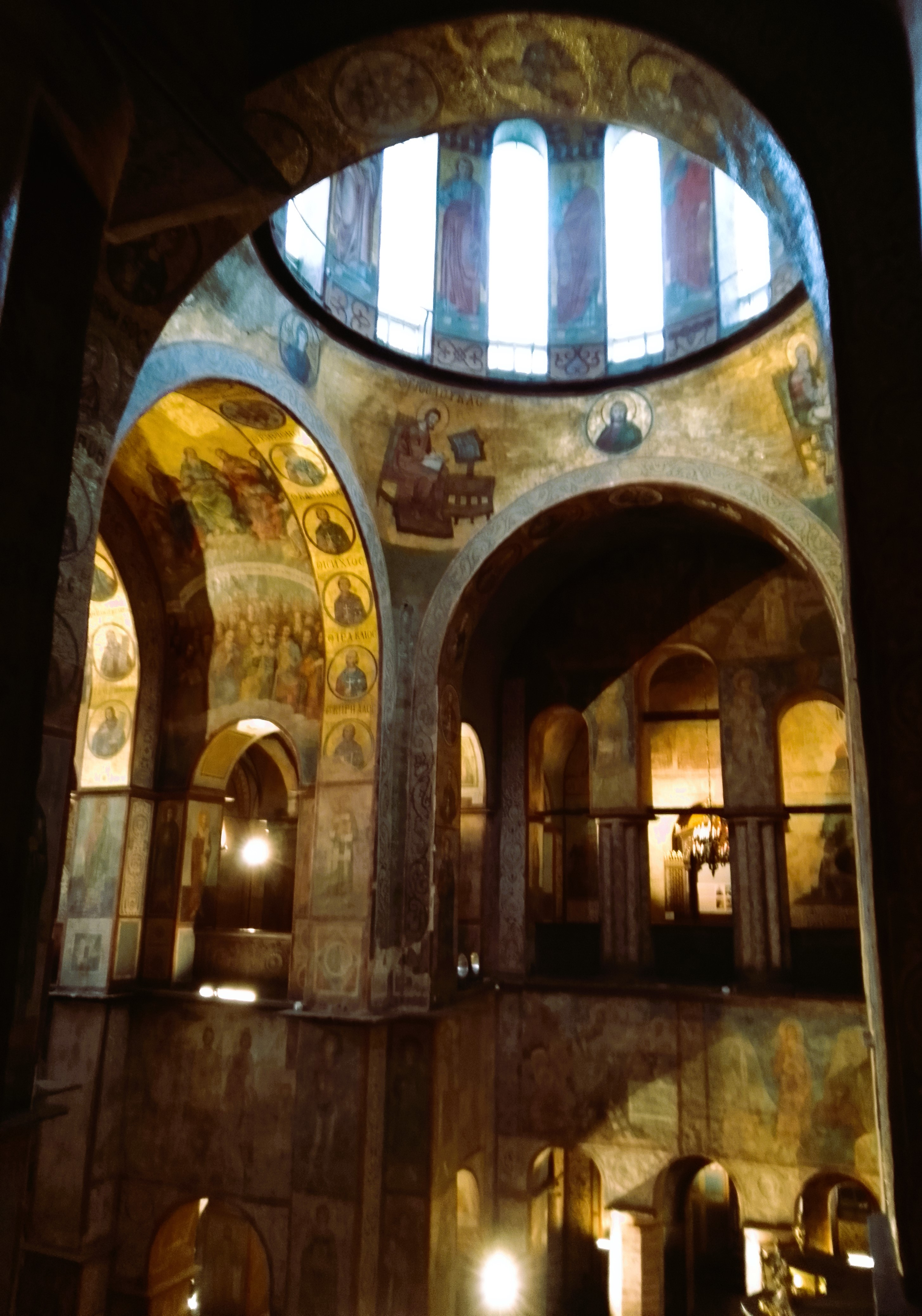
The cathedral's interior by the central dome

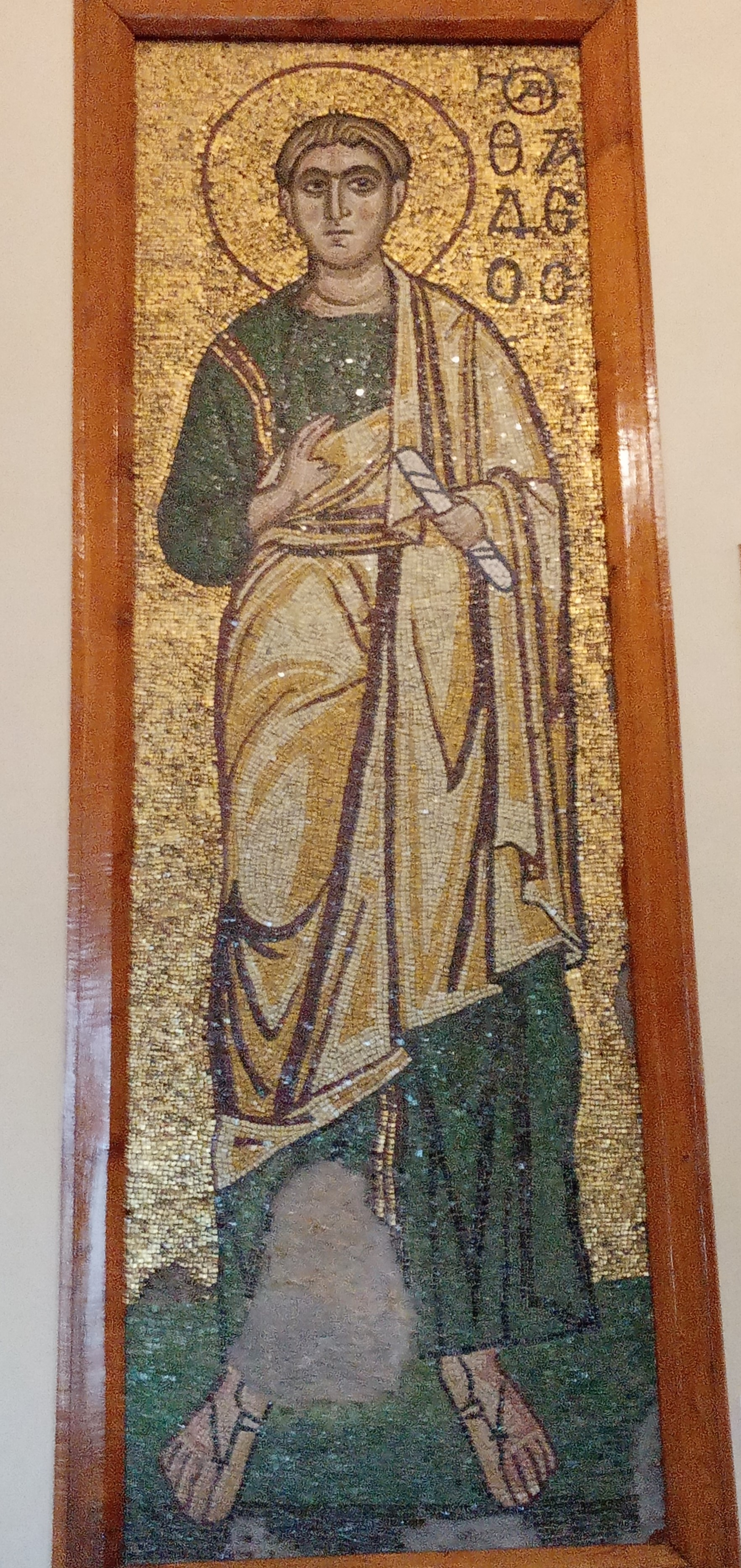
The Jude the Apostle mosaic

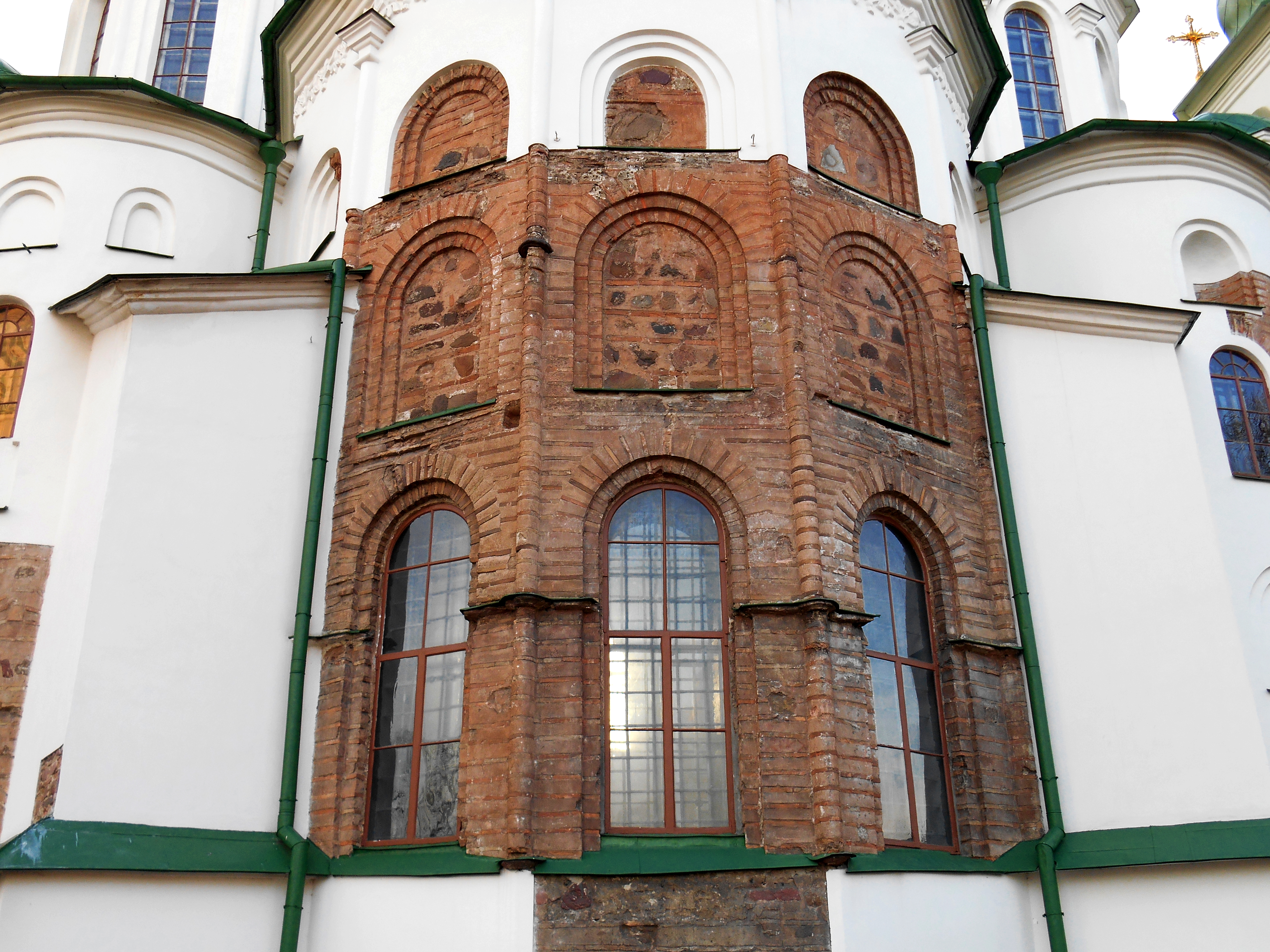
A view of the exterior brickwork

=== 16th–19th century ===
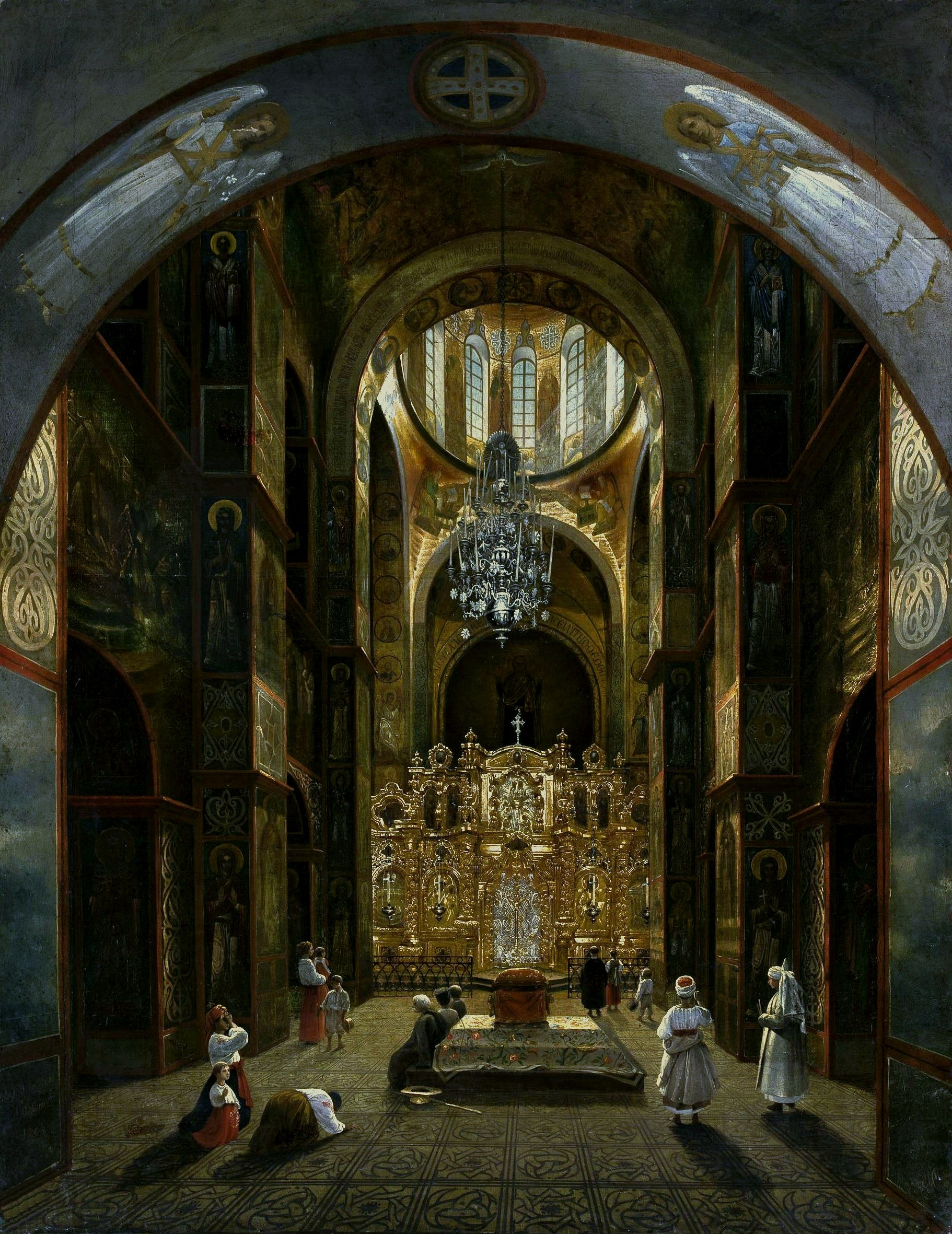
Mikhail Sazhin, Interior of St. Sophia Cathedral in Kyiv (1854), National Museum in Warsaw

From 1497 until 1577, the cathedral was left abandoned, until in that year Bogusz Gulkevych-Glibovsky renovated the cathedral at his own expense. In 1596, following the Union of Brest, ownership of the cathedral was transferred to the Ruthenian Uniate Church. From the formation of the Ukrainian Greek Catholic Church in 1596 until the official re-acceptance of Orthodox Christianity in 1632, St. Sophia’s Cathedral was used as place of worship for Greek Catholics; as a result of the acceptance of the union by Metropolitan Michael Rohoza, St Sophia was under the jurisdiction of the Union Church.

On 2 July 1633, Mohyla regained authority over the cathedral and founded a monastery, after which the cathedral became the property of the restored Orthodox Metropolis of Kyiv of the Ecumenical Patriarchate of Constantinople. In 1786 the monastery was abolished, and its lands were confiscated. In 1697, the wooden buildings were all destroyed in a fire.

==== Early rebuilding and restoration work ====
During the reign of Petro Mohyla (1633–1647), restoration work was begun on the cathedral. Its appearance in the mid-17th century is known from the drawings of Abraham van Westerveld and the description of Paul of Aleppo. According to their contemporary accounts, the church had 70 altars, and 36 crosses installed on its cupolas. Mohyla had a new iconostasis built, and two side altars in the external galleries installed. Mohyla involved the Italian architect Octaviano Mancini in the restoration work on the cathedral, which he carried out by Mancini in collaboration with the Ukrainian brothers Timish and Ivan Zinoviev, the gilder Yakym Evtykhiev, the icon painter Joachim, and carvers, carpenters, and masons from Moscow. Instead of maintaining a Byzantine style of architecture for the exterior of the cathedral, Mohyla and his architects were influenced by western European ideas, transformed St Sophia to give it the outward appearance of a Baroque church. The reconstruction work was continued after Mohyla's death in 1647 by Metropolitan Sylvester Kosiv, until his death in 1657.

Between 1690 and 1707 a major renovation of St Sophia was overseen by the Metropolitan Varlaam Yasinsky, with the financial assistance of Hetman Ivan Mazepa. The cathedral's galleries were raised, four new domes were added, and the tops of the towers were rebuilt in the Ukrainian Baroque style. In 1699, a new domed bell tower was built—the dome was gilded at Mazepa's expense. The other new buildings in the complex were completed by 1767. The remains of the west gallery, the arcade, and part of the choirs were dismantled. By 1695, an outer gallery had been added, along with six new domes. The fire of 1697 led to destruction in the recently restored west end, and new work had to be undertaken to repair the damage caused.

The next major restoration to the cathedral took place between 1843 and 1853. Between 1882 and 1889, a number of the Baroque pediments were removed, and a narthex was built on the site of the western gallery.

=== 20th century–present ===
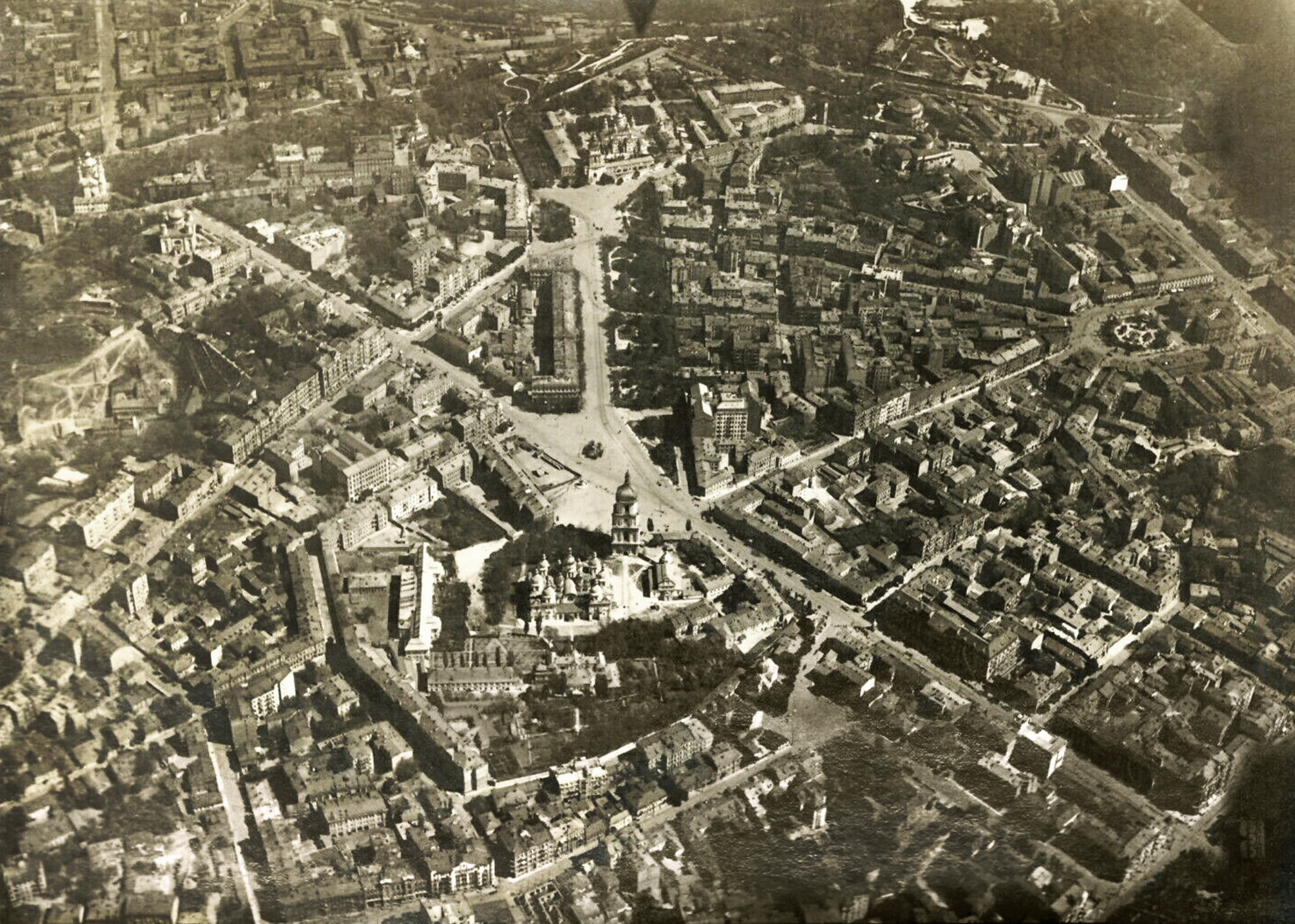
A 1918 photograph of Kyiv centred on St Sophia's Cathedral

In 1917, the Central Committee for the Protection of Monuments of Antiquity and Art in Ukraine began research into the cathedral. During the Soviet anti-religious campaign of the 1920s, the government called for the cathedral to be demolished and the grounds to be transformed into a park named in honour of the heroes of Perekop. The cathedral was saved from demolition. St. Sophia was the cathedral of the Ukrainian Autocephalous Orthodox Church from 1921 until 1930. In October 1921, Vasyl Lypkivsky was consecrated as the Metropolitan of Kyiv and All Ukraine of the Ukrainian Apostolic Church. In 1921, the All-Ukrainian Academy of Sciences created the Sophia Commission, which was able to save the cathedral from being demolished.

The National Reserve "Sophia of Kyiv", a state architectural and historical reserve containing the cathedral and other historic buildings, was established in 1934. This enabled research and restoration work to be carried out on the cathedral and other buildings in the complex. The last acting vicar of St Sophia, Yuri Mikhnovsky, was the incumbent from 1931 until his expulsion in 1934, after which the authorities banned services in the cathedral. Gold and silver items (including the royal gates, icons, candlesticks, vestments, and books) were confiscated, and the iconostases were dismantled and stripped of their gold. The reserve opened to visitors in the spring of 1935.

During the Second World War, Kyiv was occupied by the German Wehrmacht from 19 September 1941 until its liberation on 6 November 1943. According to a previous director of the Sophia Museum, Alexei Povstenko, German sappers prevented the NKVD from blowing up the cathedral, who had mined the building in September 1941. Church services were resumed in October 1941. In January 1942 the occupation authorities established a short-lived museum (it closed in October 1943 as the Germans were about to retreat from Kyiv). The Reichsleiter Rosenberg Taskforce listed the cathedral's remaining valuables. The Nazis expropriated some of the remaining historical pieces, and only a small proportion were returned after the end of the war.

Politicians have promised during the 1980s onwards to return St Sophia to the Orthodox Church, but a final decision has been postponed. Both the Eastern Orthodox Church and the Greek-Catholic Church lay sole claim using the cathedral for worship. Catholics worshippers have not been permitted to use the cathedral; the Orthodox churches have sometimes been allowed to conduct services at different dates, and other times they have been denied access. In 1995, riot police attacked mourners during the funeral of Patriarch Volodymyr Romaniuk of the Ukrainian Orthodox Church – Kyiv Patriarchate. The patriarch was buried in a makeshift grave after the situation was brought back under control. Representatives of five Orthodox churches read the first joint prayer for Ukraine in the cathedral in 2006.

On June 10, 2025, as a result of a blast wave caused by shelling of Kyiv by the Russian Federation during the Russo-Ukrainian War, part of the central apse on the eastern facade was damaged.

==== Later restoration work ====
During the German occupation of Kyiv, the state of the buildings in the reserve was documented, and renovation work was begun.

During the 21st century, the reserve has been involved in research with the aim of preserving the buildings. The movement of the buildings, as well as the levels of nearby groundwater, the nature of the foundations and soil compaction zones, the condition of the wall paintings, the strength of stress forces acting on the cathedral and the bell tower, and the cathedral's microclimate, have been investigated, mapped, and monitored. In 2023, an invitation to tender was initiated for a 5-year project to restore the roof, domes, and other structural elements of St. Sophia.

==== International recognition ====
In 1990 the ensemble of the St. Sophia Monastery was included in the UNESCO World Heritage List. In 2007, the St Sophia's Cathedral was named one of the Seven Wonders of Ukraine. In September 2023, Kyiv was listed as a World Heritage "in danger" because of Russia's war in Ukraine. This move by the United Nations was an effort to produce aid and protection for the site.

== Architecture ==
=== The original cathedral ===
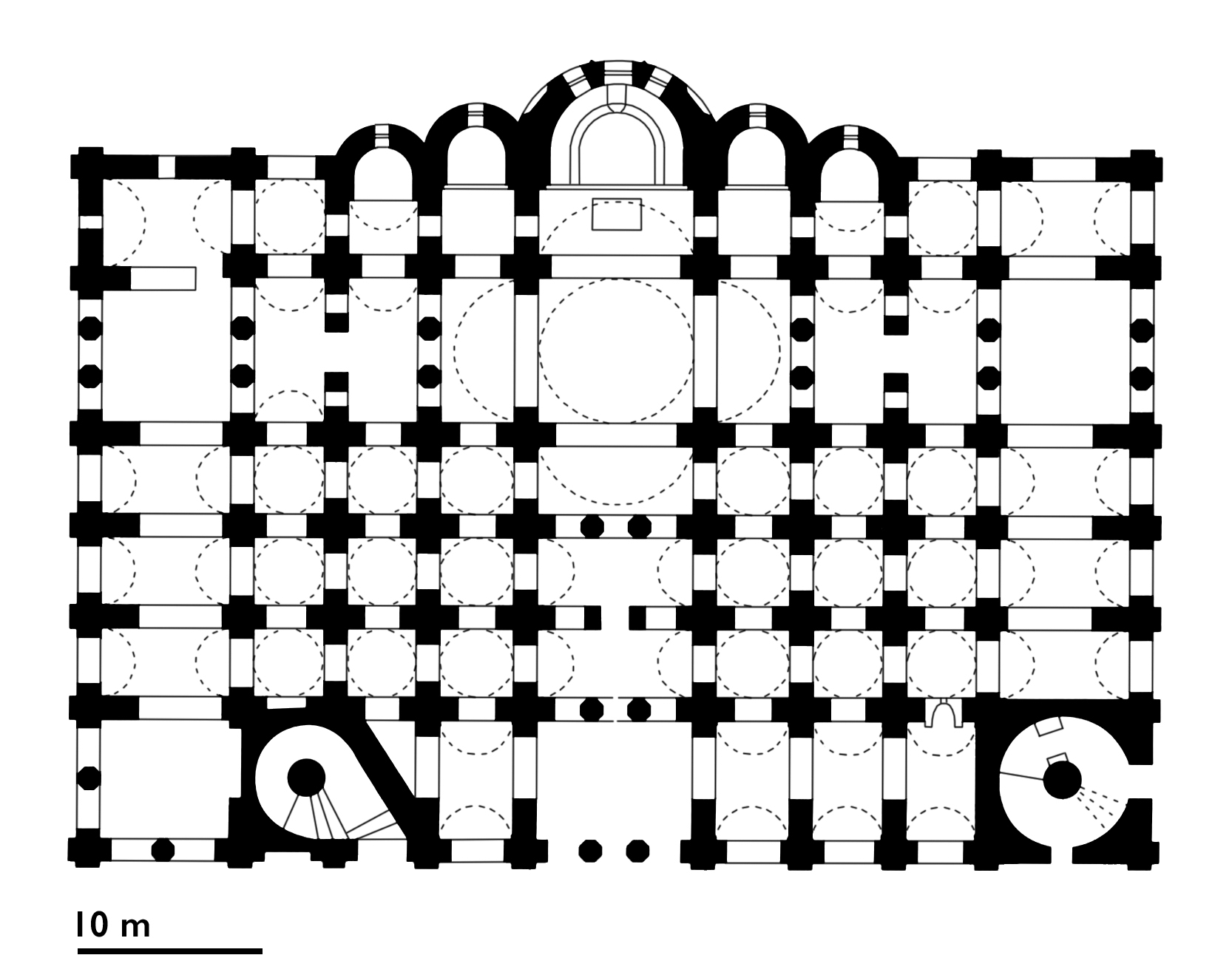
Ground floor plan of the original 11th-century cathedral

St Sophia is one of the largest churches built in Europe during the 11th century, and is one of the oldest and best-preserved examples of Kyivan Rus’ architecture. As the architects were given a task not previously encountered—to build a huge church with spacious choirs, they deviated from the standard model for a Byzantine church. To reduce costs, they used local materials, incorporating brick cross-shaped pillar into the design instead of marble columns, and slabs of pink Ovruch pyrophyllite slate and ceramic tiles instead of marble slabs. The construction materials used were brick, stone, and lime mortar. Russian scholars have in the past attributed differences between St Sophia and other Byzantine churches to the influences of Russian church architecture. The plans of the foundations of St. Sophia and an earlier church, the Church of the Tithes are similar.

The cathedral's main dimensions are multiples of the number 12—a standard area of 12 by 12 feet (3.7 m × 3.7 m) is used in the majority of the spaces. The inner radius of the central apse is equal to 12 feet, and the diameters of the drums of the small domes are also close to this value. If the thickness of the walls is taken into account, the length, width and height of the cathedral are all equal to 100 feet (30 m), a measurement used since Classical antiquity.

==== Exterior ====
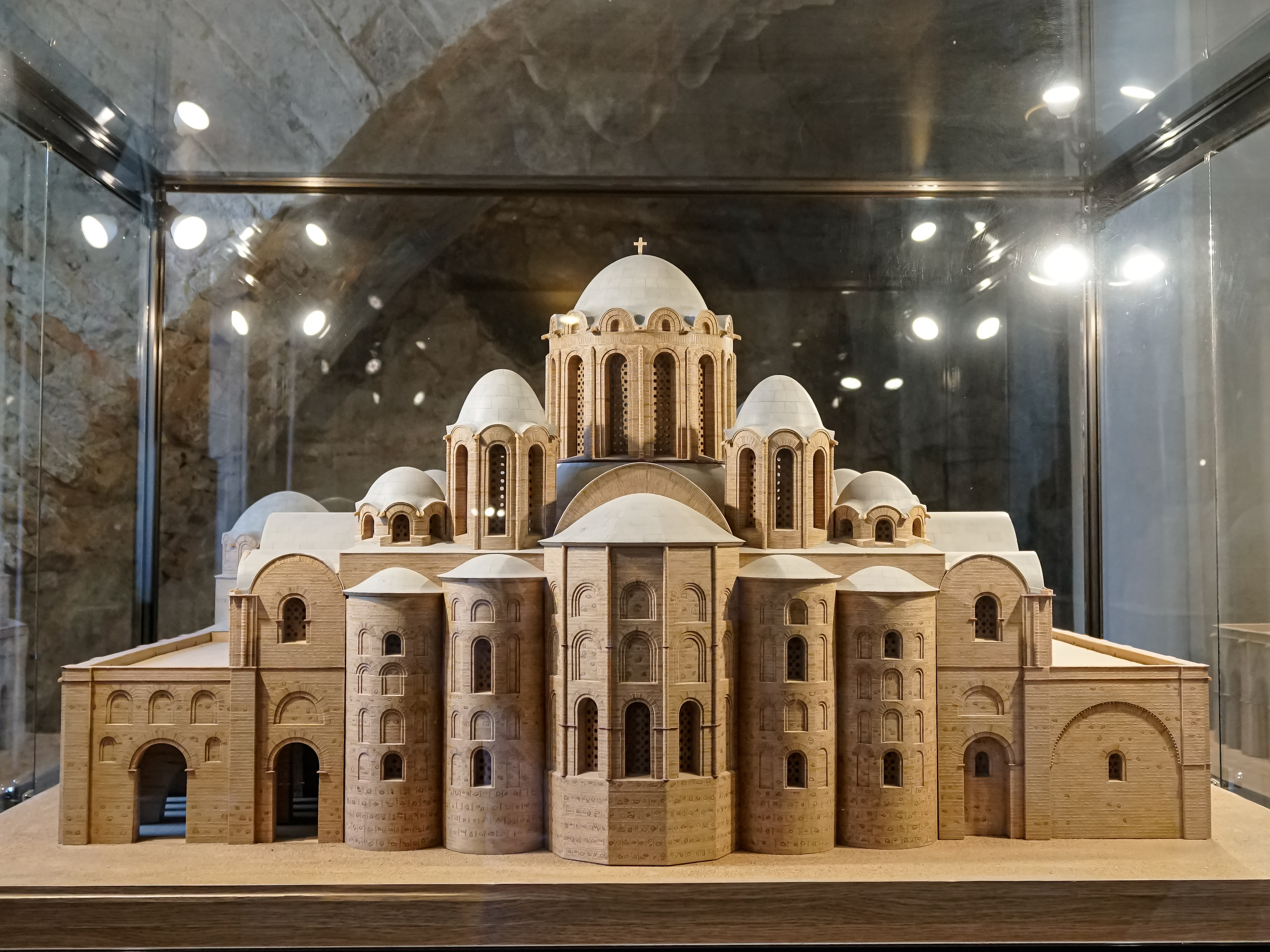
A model reconstruction of the original appearance of St Sophia's Cathedral

The 11th-century cathedral was a large five-nave church, with the eastern ends of the naves completed by semicircular apses (semi-circular recesses at the east end of the main building).

The core of the cathedral (without the galleries) was a square of sides 100 feet (30 m) in length, the same size of the domed square of the Hagia Sophia. The original building was topped with 13 domes covered in lead sheets, with 12 smaller domes grouped around the largest dome, forming a stepped pyramidal shape. The central part of the cathedral was surrounded on the north, west and south sides by a two-tiered inner row of galleries, and a single-tiered outer row that was topped by a balcony, or gulbyshche.

The outside of the cathedral was not originally plastered. The facades were decorated with recessed niches, windows had carved wooden frames. The walls were laid out of large natural stones of granite and pink quartzite that alternated with rows of flat bricks. A pink lime-cement mortar was used, and pieces differently-sized stones were included in the thick layer of the mortar.

==== Interior ====
The interior of the cathedral has been preserved almost unchanged since the 11th century. The rectangular space inside the original cathedral was divided by 12 columns into five parallel naves intersected by transverse naves, to produce what Nikitenko has described as a "hierarchically ordered cosmos". The intersection of the central nave and the transept, above which the main dome rises, forms an equilateral cross. There were five altars occupying the aspses at the east end. The central cross is closed from the east by the wall of the main altar, and from the north, west and south by two-tier three-span arcades (the western one has not been preserved).

At the corners of the western side, two stair towers were built, to lead to the choirs. The ancient mosaic floor, of which only a few fragments are exposed, was composed of designs that reflected Byzantine architectural forms. Under the main dome, a large square with a circle (representing the union of earth and heaven) was laid out.

== Interior decoration ==
St Sophia is unique in that on the interior walls are preserved the world's greatest collection of early 11th-century mosaics and frescoes. Masterpieces include the Pantocrator, the Virgin Orans, the Communion of the Apostles, the Deisis, and the Annunciation. The mosaics of St Sophia cover a total of 260 square metres (2,800 sq ft) of the walls; there are 3,000 square metres (32,000 sq ft) of frescos. Mosaics highlight the main parts of the interior such as the central domed altar—the walls of the five original naves, the upper floor choirs, the two towers and the lost galleries that surrounded the cathedral, were decorated with frescoes. The mosaics and frescoes had been whitewashed by 1701. In 1884, the Russian art historian and archaeologist Adrian Prakhov rediscovered and studied the mosaics, which initiated the process of their restoration by future conservators.

=== Mosaics ===
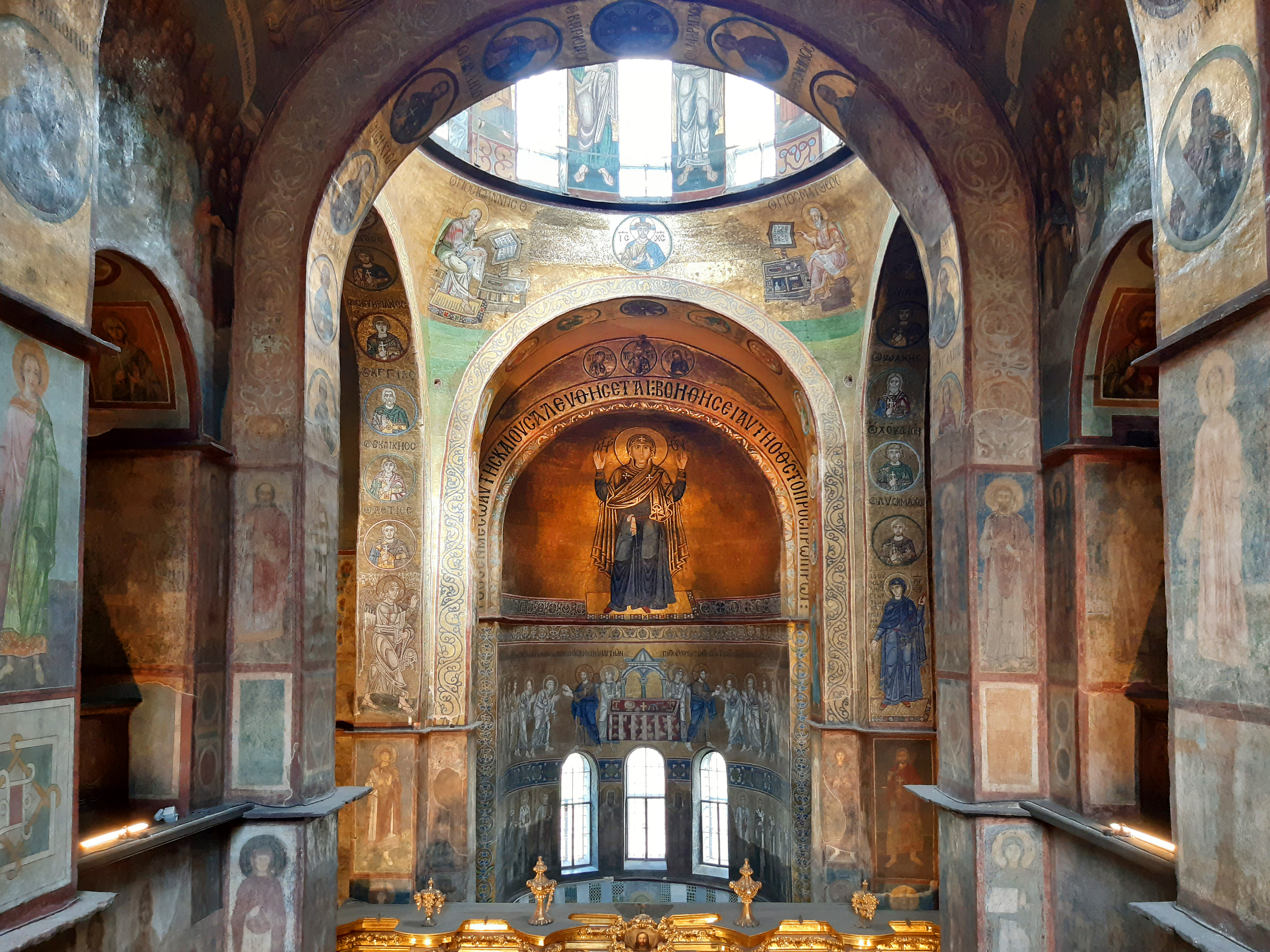
The interior of the cathedral. The central mosaic is the Virgin Orans.

Although the names of the individual workers are not known, the artistic features of individual images and the methods of laying the smalt shows that a team of eight craftsmen worked on the wall mosaics in the cathedral. Each of the mosaics has an explanatory inscription in Medieval Greek.

The mosaics were made with a shining golden background. The predominant foreground colours were blue and grey-white in combination with purple. The large number of colours used is one indication that the glassmakers and smalt manufacturers of the period were highly skilled—the colours used have not been able to be replicated by modern experts.

The vault of the central apse—and indeed the entire cathedral's interior—is dominated by the 6-metre-high (20 ft) Virgin Orans.

The mosaics of the central dome and sanctuary represent people and scenes from the Scriptures. A medallion in the summit of the central dome bears a huge half-length image of Christ Pantocrator. Arranged around him are four archangels, one of which remains intact; the other three were painted over using oils by the Russian artist Mikhail Vrubel in 1884. Of the twelve mosaic portraits of the Apostles painted on the inside of the dome's drum, only the upper part of the figure of Saint Paul has survived. Nearby were the Four Evangelists, of whom Saint Mark alone is extant. Of the mosaic medallions on the wall arches, 15 have survived. The two piers of the eastern wall arch feature the Annunciation, and the lower tier of the apse features the surviving upper parts of figures depicting the Church Fathers. The multi-figure depiction of the Last Supper spreads over a large area in the intermediate tier of the apse.

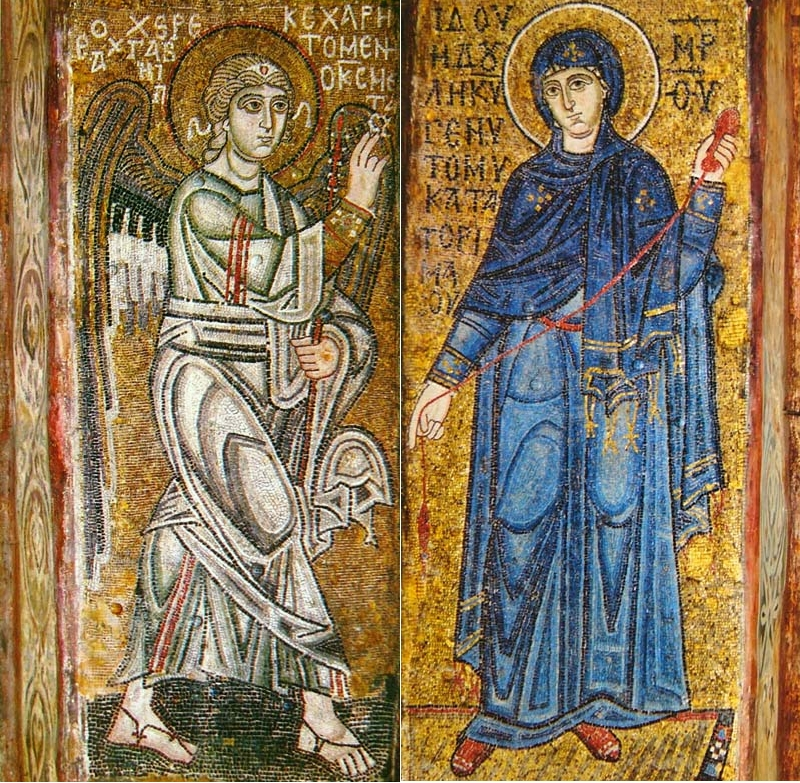
The Annunciation

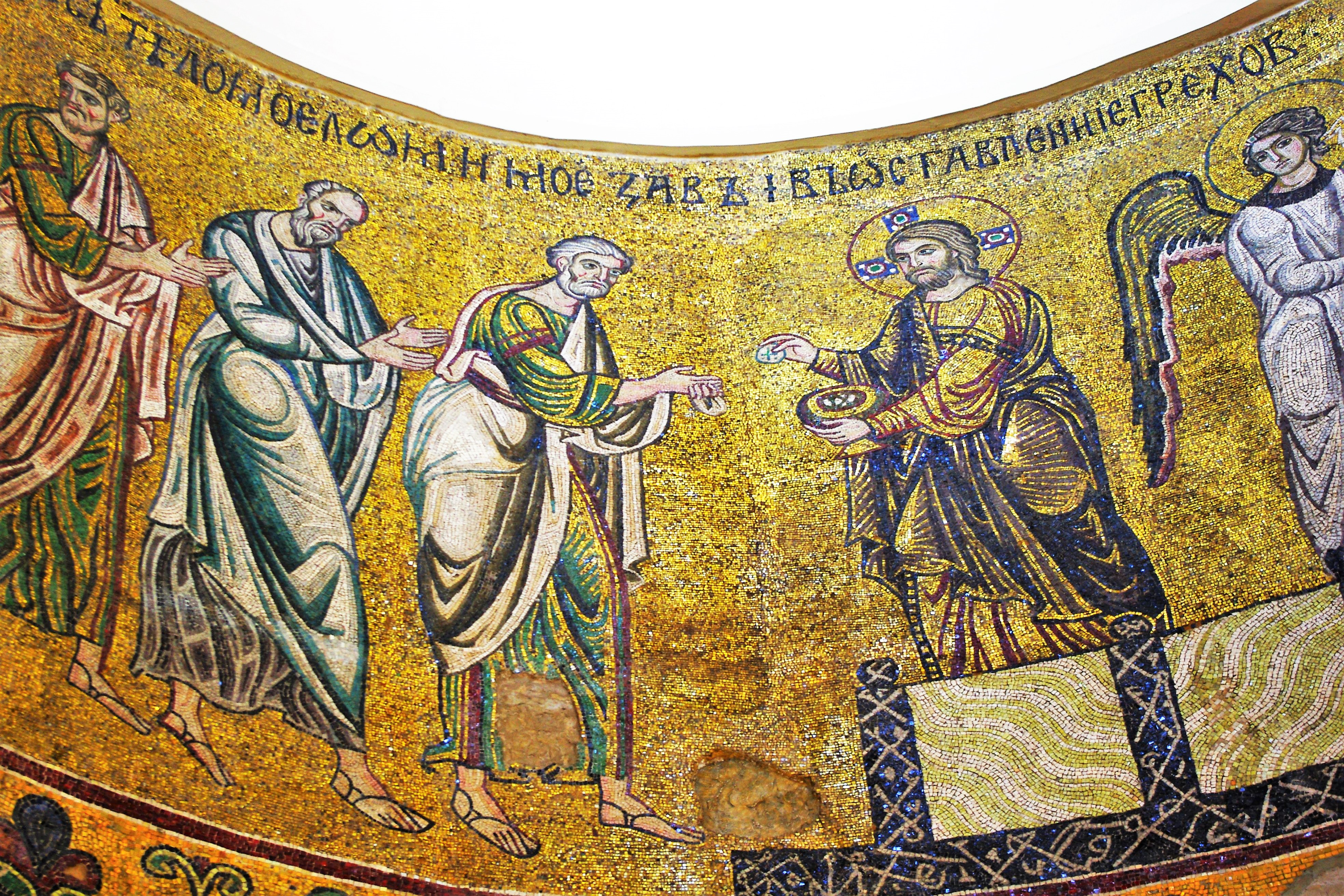
A detail of the Lord's Supper

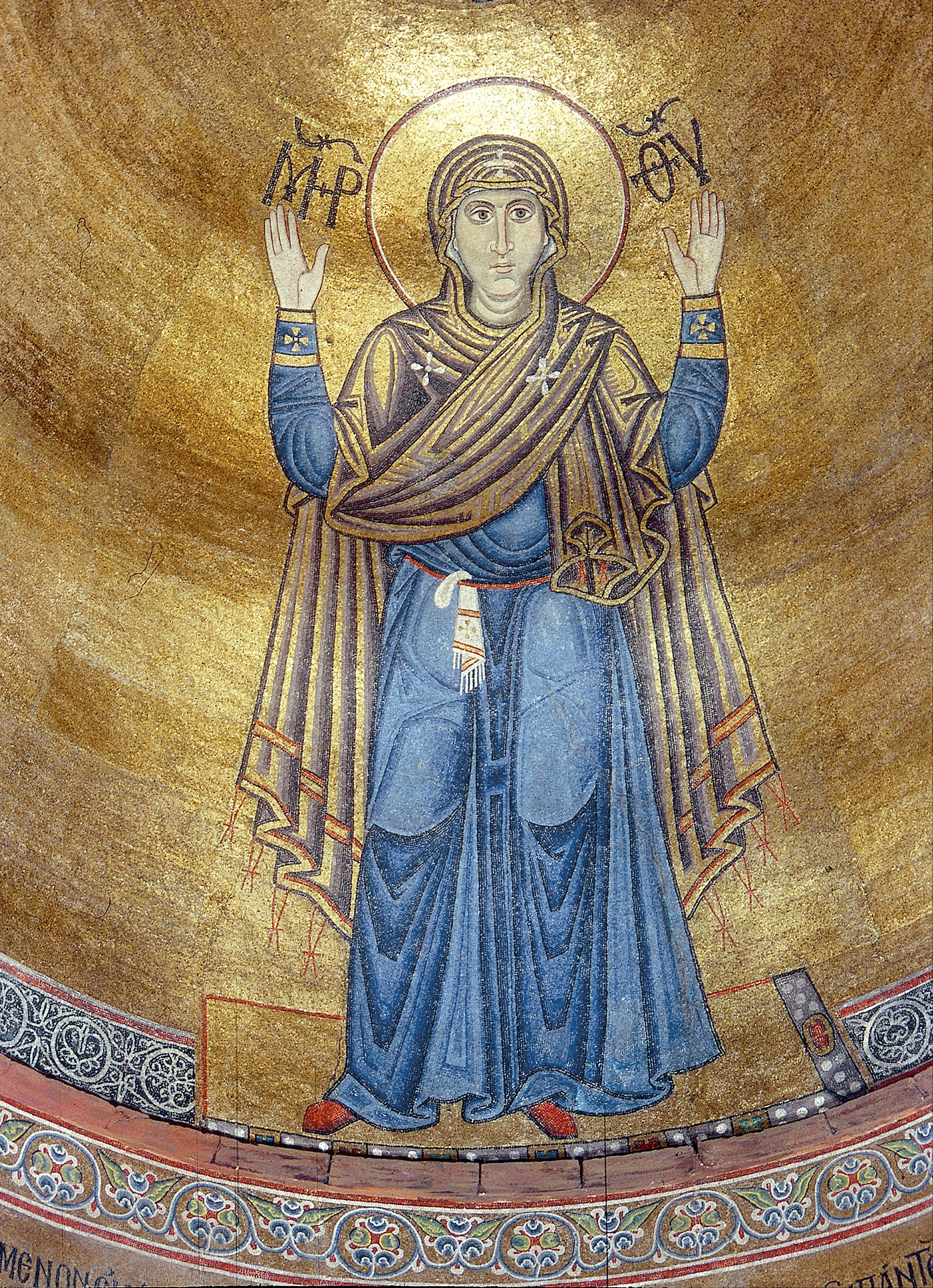
The Orans of Kyiv

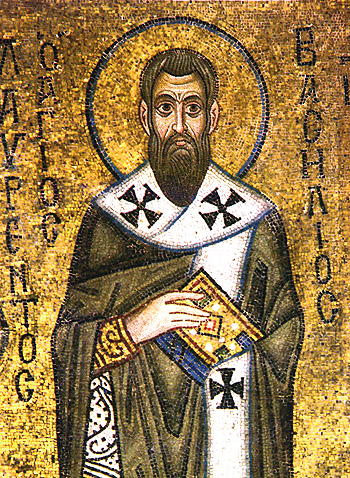
Basil the Great

=== Frescoes ===
During restoration to the cathedral in the decade following 1843, 1853, the cathedral's 11th-century frescoes were rediscovered by the Russian art historian Fedor Solntsev. After having been given official approval to proceed, they were covered over with oil paintings. The walls of the five aisles, the choir, and the two towers are covered with frescos. They were painted in a variety of colours—mainly dark red, yellow, olive, and white tones, painted with a blue background. Many were reserved below a layer of plaster before being revealed during the 20th century. They were created when the cathedral was built in the 11th century, with the intention of both promoting the recently-adopted Christian doctrine and reinforcing the ideas of feudal power.

During the 1950s, more frescoes were revealed, and others dating the 18th century frescoes were repaired.

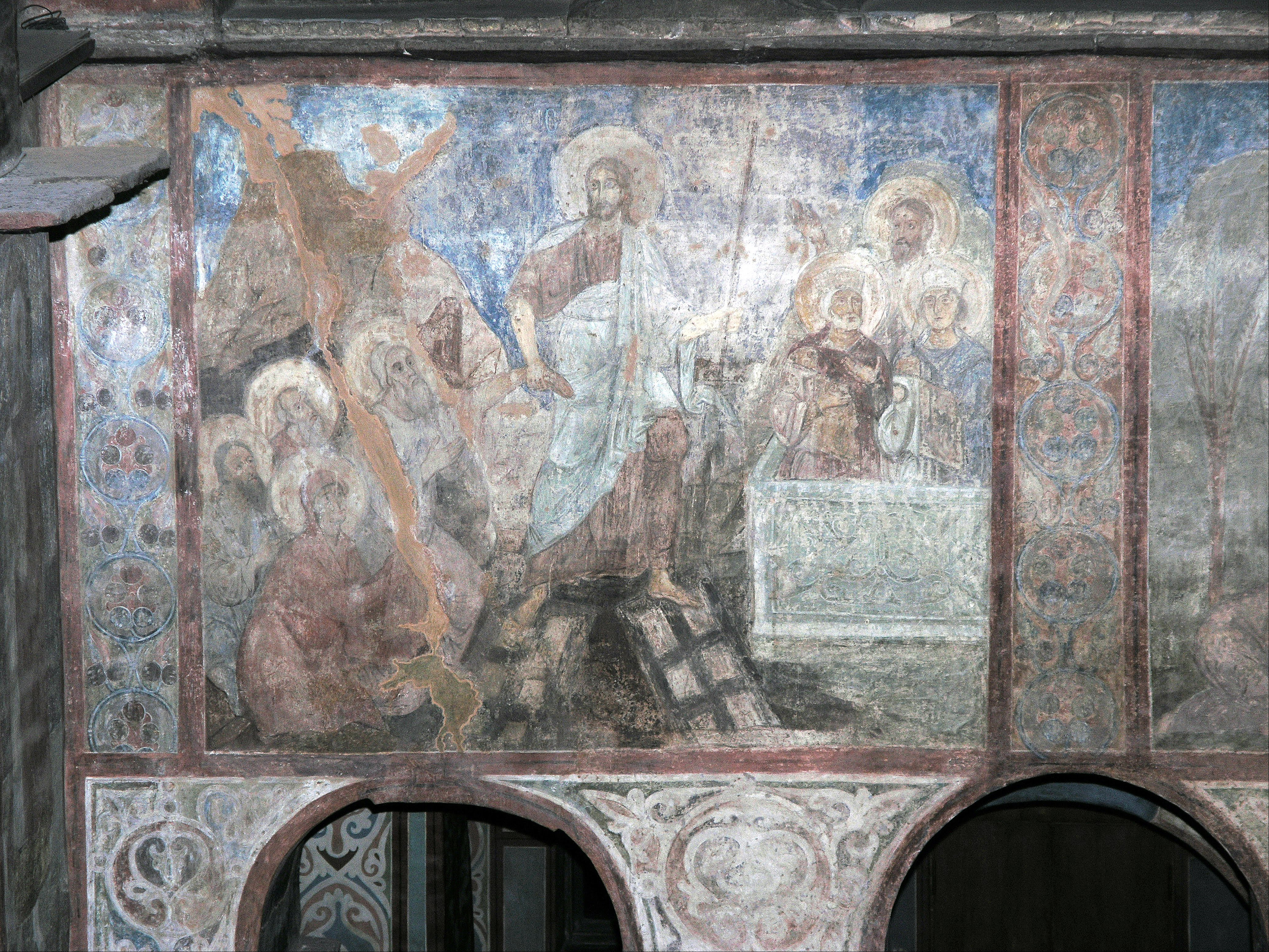
Christ's descent into Hell

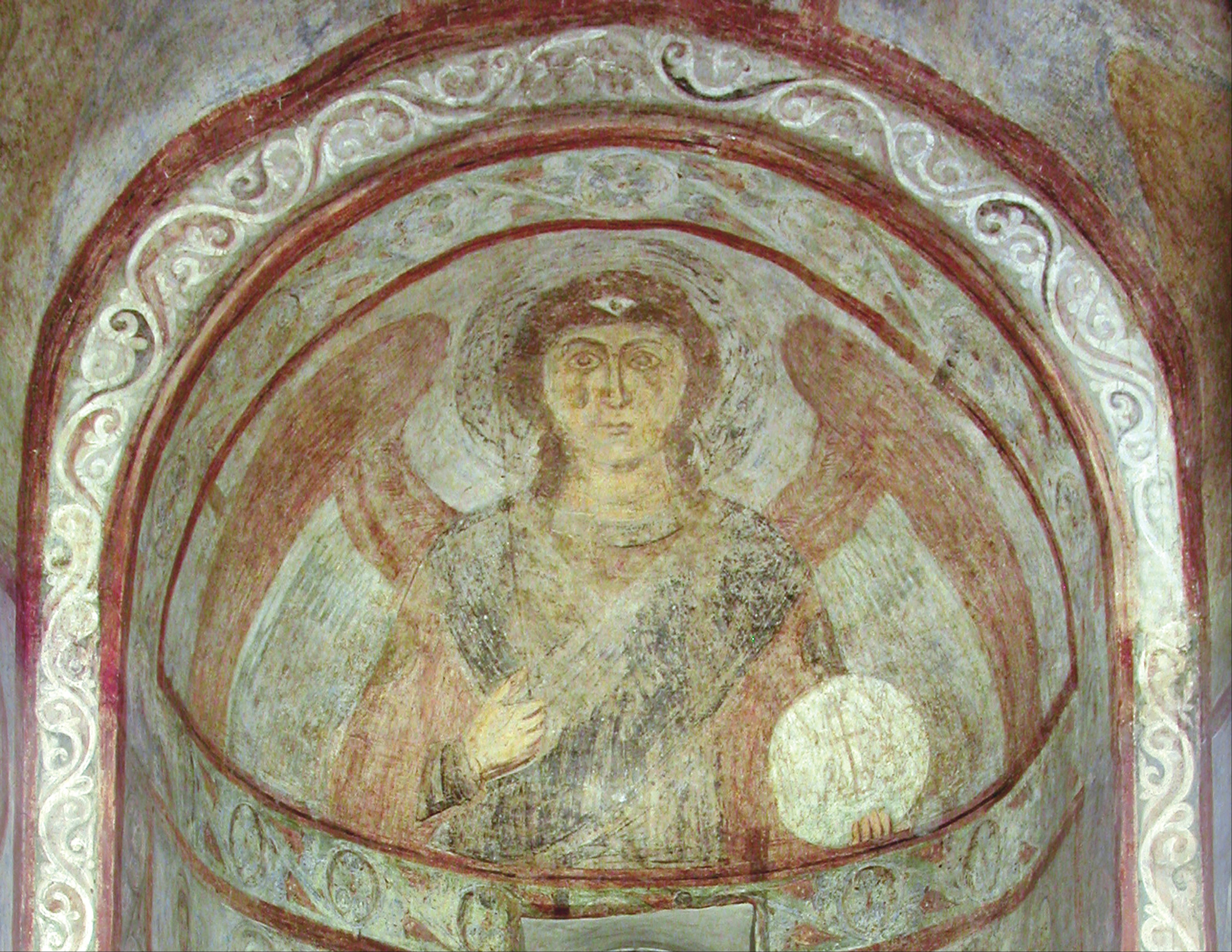
The Archangel Michael

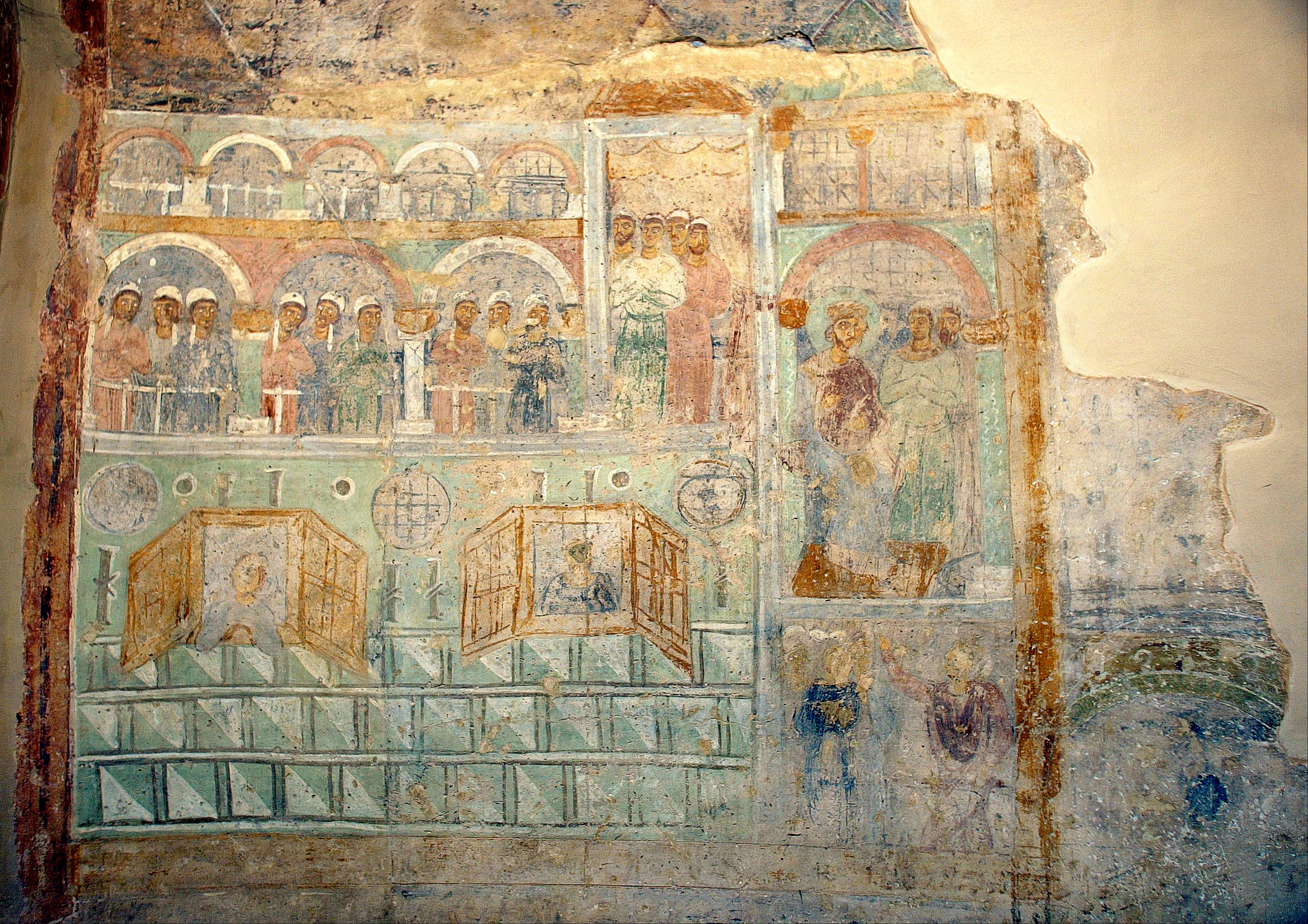
The Palace of Hippodrome

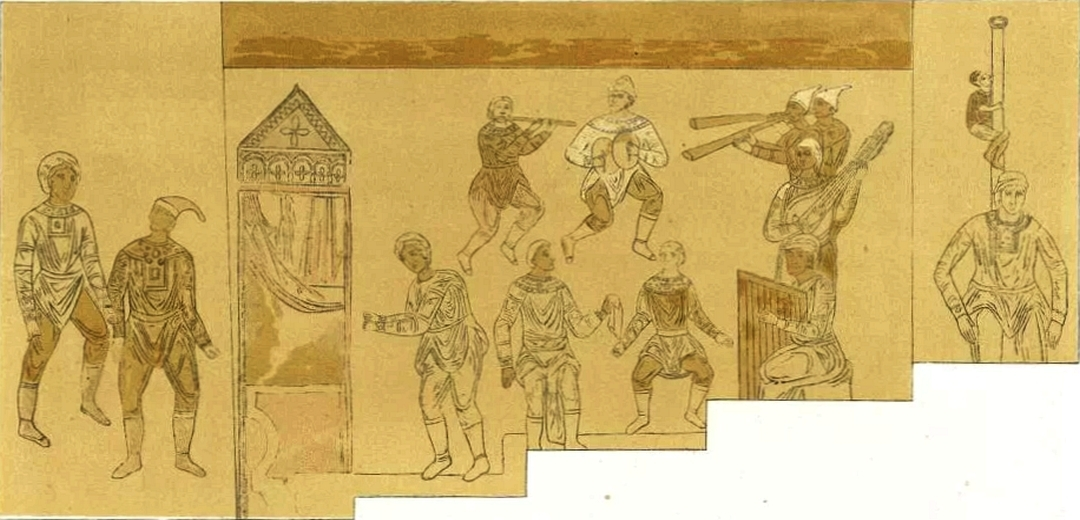
A group of entertainers with musical instruments

The frescoes in the transept depict scenes relating to Christ. Four of the best preserved are of the Crucifixion of Jesus, the Christ's descent into Hell, the appearance of Christ to the Holy Women, and the Descent of the Holy Spirit. The choir features subjects as the Wedding at Cana, the Miracle of the Loaves and Fishes, The Lord's Supper, Abraham and the Three Angels, and the three youths in the fiery furnacе.

The largest group of images were a unique series of saints. Over 250 are extant; the original number was more than three times as many. The painting of the southern altar is dedicated to the Archangel Michael, the patron saint of Kyiv and the Grand Princes of Kyivan Rus', whilst he frescoes of the northernmost altar depict Saint George, the spiritual patron of Yaroslav the Wise. All of the Forty Martyrs of Sebaste are depicted in a separate composition.

The frescoes in the towers that led to the original outer galleries are of secular subjects, as they were intended to be seen by the Grand Prince and a few of the clergy. These frescoes depict scenes of the Byzantine court and the Hippodrome of Constantinople, such as the emperor watching races in his box, hunting scenarios, and scenes with warriors.

On three walls of the central nave, is the lhe largest fresco in the cathedral, at 15 metres (49 ft) long. It purportedly shows Yaroslav the Wise and his family during the consecration of St Sophia. Yaroslav was portrayed holding a model of the cathedral, along with his wife Irene, his daughters, who later became queens of France, Norway and Hungary, and his sons, who became important political figures in the Kyivan Rus' state in the latter half of the 11th century. Only part of the composition has survived.

According to Nikitenko, the portraits are of the family of Prince Vladimir Svyatoslavich. The frescoes constitute a grand princely triumphal cycle, that illustrates the conclusion of the marriage of Vladimir and the Byzantine princess Anna in 988, and which marked the Christianization of Kievan Rus'

Other secular frescoes show hunters, acrobats, musicians, dancers, wrestlers, and horsemen. Pictures of animals, birds, and fantastic creatures frequently appear in the frescoes. Of interest are the figures of buffoons with musical instruments that include a musician with a bowed instrument, musicians playing on psalteries and lutes, and flutists. A picture of a pipe organ, the only known example in Kyivan Rus' art, is depicted in the southern tower.

=== Graffiti ===
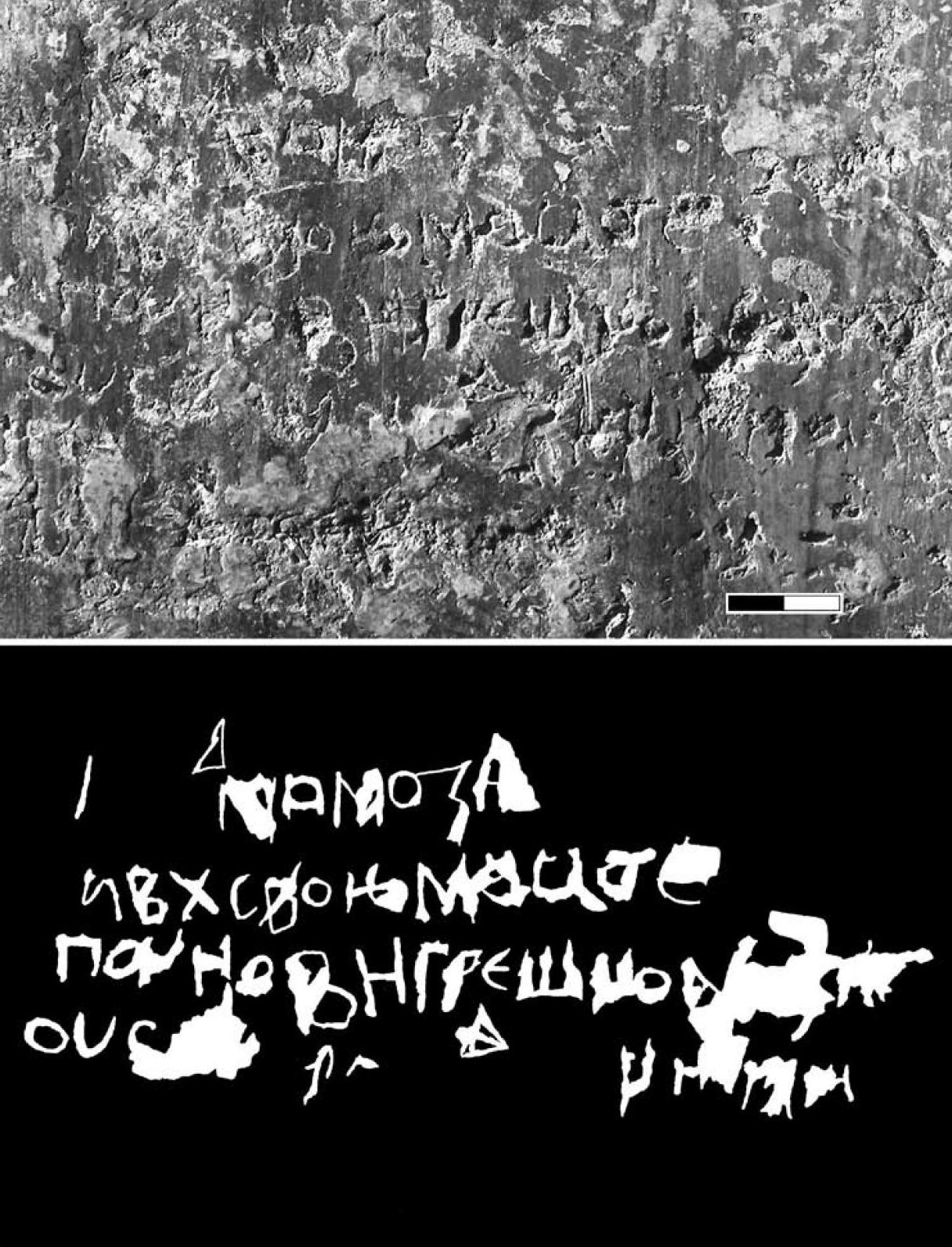
Graffiti#1330 ("help [your] slave Stepan's sinful servant"), one of over 7,000 inscriptions and drawings in the cathedral. (Note: The form of the letter "в" in the text has been used to date it to the 2nd quarter of the 11th century – 1st quarter of the 13th century.)

The graffiti inscribed on the walls of St Sophia was left by priests and visitors to the cathedral during its existence. More than 7,000 11th–18th century examples of drawings and texts have been discovered, a number indicative of a high level of literacy in Ukrainian lands during this period.

Some of the inscriptions are graffiti are written in Glagolitic script. The texts contain valuable information about historic events in Kievan Rus'; examples include a record of the death of Yaroslav the Wise, the autograph of Grand Prince Volodymyr Monomakh, a record of a peace treaty concluded at the end of the 11th century between princes Svyatopolk Izyaslavich, Volodymyr Monomakh and Oleg I of Chernigov, and a mention of the 12th century purchase of land by Maria Mstislavna, the wife of Vsevolod II of Kyiv. A series of dates was discovered on the walls that make up an eschatological calendar and testify to expectations in the first third of the 11th century of the Second Coming of Christ. In different places of the cathedral, dates on the graffiti were found that support the hypothesis that the cathedral was built from the 1010s onwards.

The majority of the inscriptions were written by Kyiv's citizens, and constitute a primary source of information about the Old Russian language, which was the vernacular language of the inhabitants of Kyivan Rus' (as opposed to Church Slavonic, which was used for literacy and liturgical purposes). Analysis of the inscriptions shows that they share features with modern Ukrainian.

=== Fittings and monuments ===
In the 12th century, a baptismal font was built into the western outer gallery. Between 1747–1754 a three-tiered iconostasis was built, the lower tier of which has survived.

== Cathedral precinct ==
Map of the St Sophia Cathedral precinct and the surrounding streets

St Sophia's Cathedral is surrounded by a Ukrainian Baroque ensemble of 17th- and 18th-century monastic buildings. The cathedral and the monastic buildings within the cathedral precinct are a secular museum, with most of its visitors being tourists. Together, they form one part of a national conservational area, the National Reserve "Sophia of Kyiv", that includes three other sites in the city—Golden Gate, St. Cyril's Church, and St Andrew's Church—as well as the Genoese fortress in Crimea.

Reconstruction works undertaken at St Sophia were awarded the “European Gold Medal for the Protection of Historic Monuments” in 1987. The cathedral and its associated buildings are used both as a museum for educational purposes, and for state events. In 1990, they were included in the UNESCO World Heritage List.

The reserve has over 80 thousand items, archaeological finds, paintings, ancient church items and books, archives, architectural drawings, and a valuable collection of 13th-century gold and silver embroided liturgical robes.

=== Bell tower ===
The lowest of the four tiers of the Bell Tower of Saint Sophia Cathedral is dominated by the gate, above which there are loopholes. The second tier has an open gallery. The third tier has round windows, and the fourth tier has openings for the bell. The construction has a Baroque dome. The unconventional placement of the bell tower to the east of the cathedral is due to a conscious desire to create an urban ensemble.

==== History ====
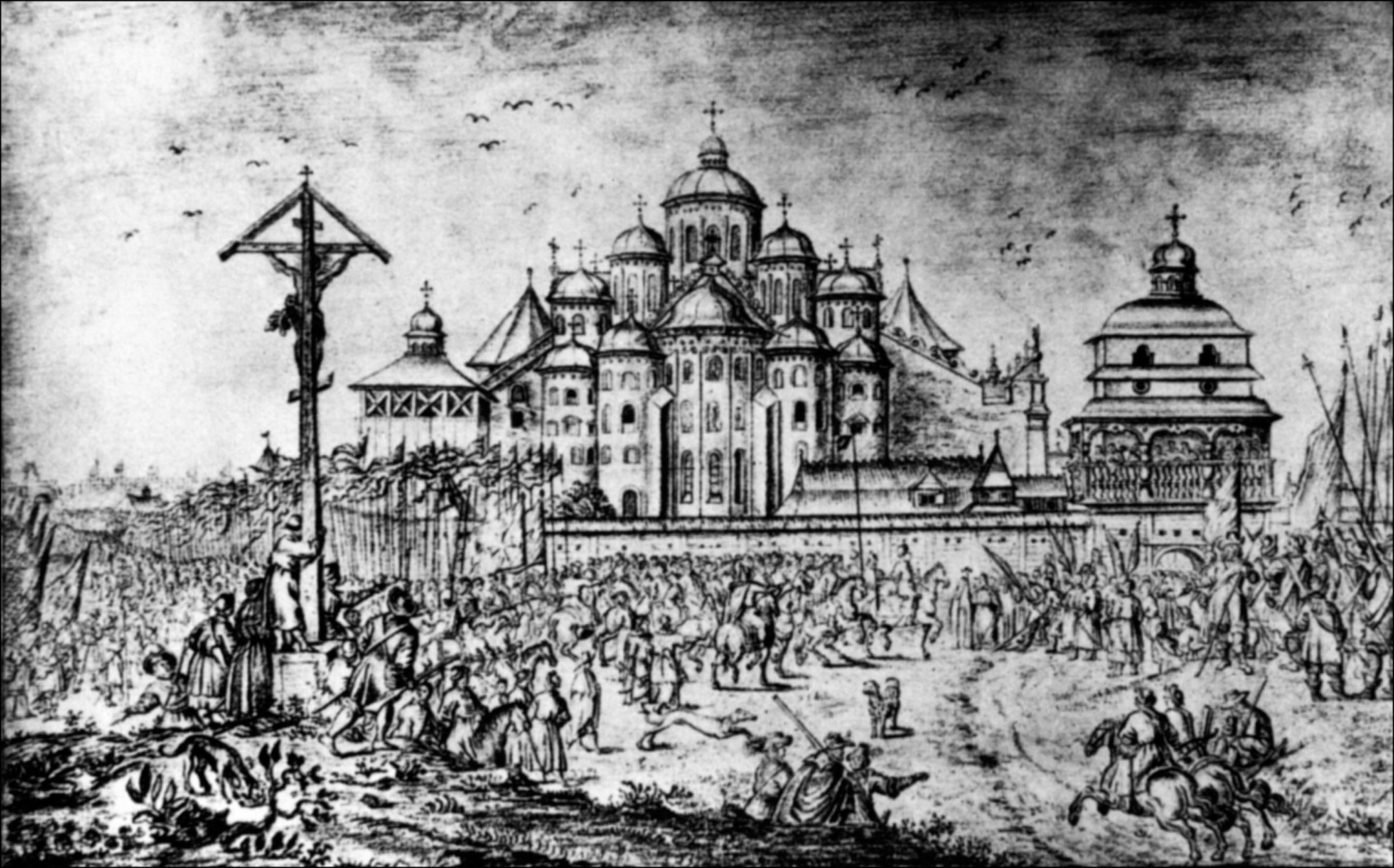
The original wooden bell tower, as drawn by Abraham van Westerveld in 1651

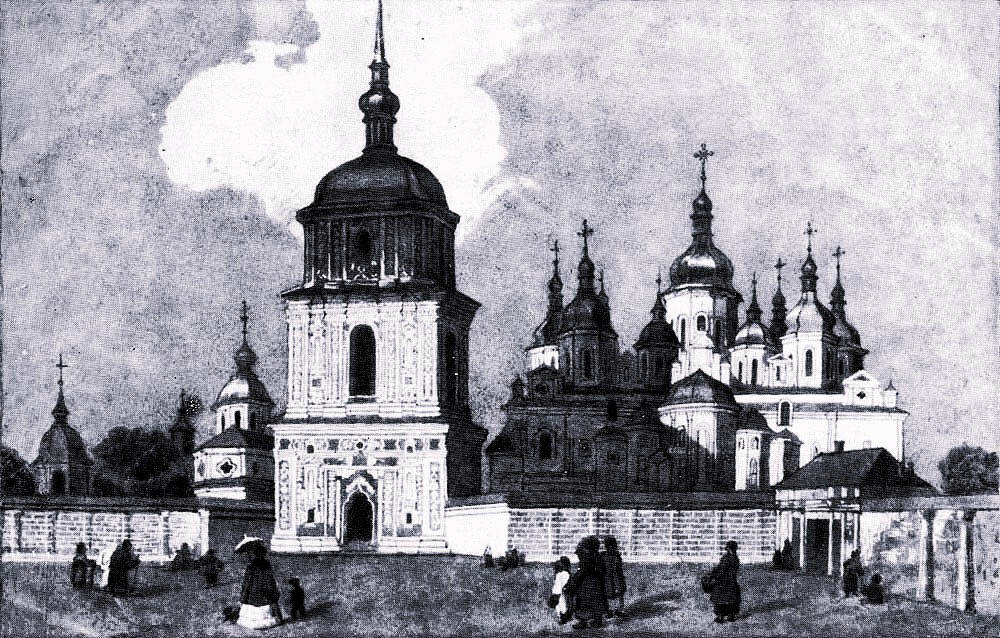
Sazhin's depiction of the cathedral painted in the 1840s, with the brick bell tower in the foreground

In a 1651 drawing of the area in the vicinity of the cathedral by van Westerfeld, a wooden four-tiered bell tower is depicted. The drawing shows that the tower once stood near the fence to the north of the cathedral. Its first tier had a passage with a semicircular arch; the second tier had an open gallery, and a parapet of carved balusters. The bell tower was built under Peter Mohyla by an unknown architect. When the tower was destroyed in a fire in 1697, it was replaced two years later with a brick tower built to the southeast of the cathedral at the expense of Hetman Mazepa, the first stone structure to be built in the complex after the fire. The 13-ton "Mazepa" bell, cast in 1705 by Afanasy Petrovich, still hangs on the second level. In 1706, the three-tiered brick structure was completed. Soon afterwards, an earthquake damaged the upper tiers.

When cracks appeared in the walls of the building in 1744, the two uppermost tiers were rebuilt by Gottfried Johann Schädel. Ornamentation was incorporated into the walls by the Stepan Stobensky and his son Ivan. The bell tower was completed by a Baroque bathhouse with a spire, covered with gilded stars on a blue background. The work was completed in 1748.

By the early 19th century, the bell tower had become dilapidated. In 1807, lightning struck the top of the tower, and the spire was then replaced. The new spire appeared to make the tower seen flatter, so a fourth tier and a high pear-shaped dome were added by the diocesan architect Pavlo Sparro. After the addition, the height of the building—an early example of the Ukrainian Baroque style—was 76 metres (249 ft).

The bell tower underwent restoration in 1953 and 1972. On 27 June 2003, after a restoration period of almost four years, the bell tower opened to visitors for the first time in 50 years.

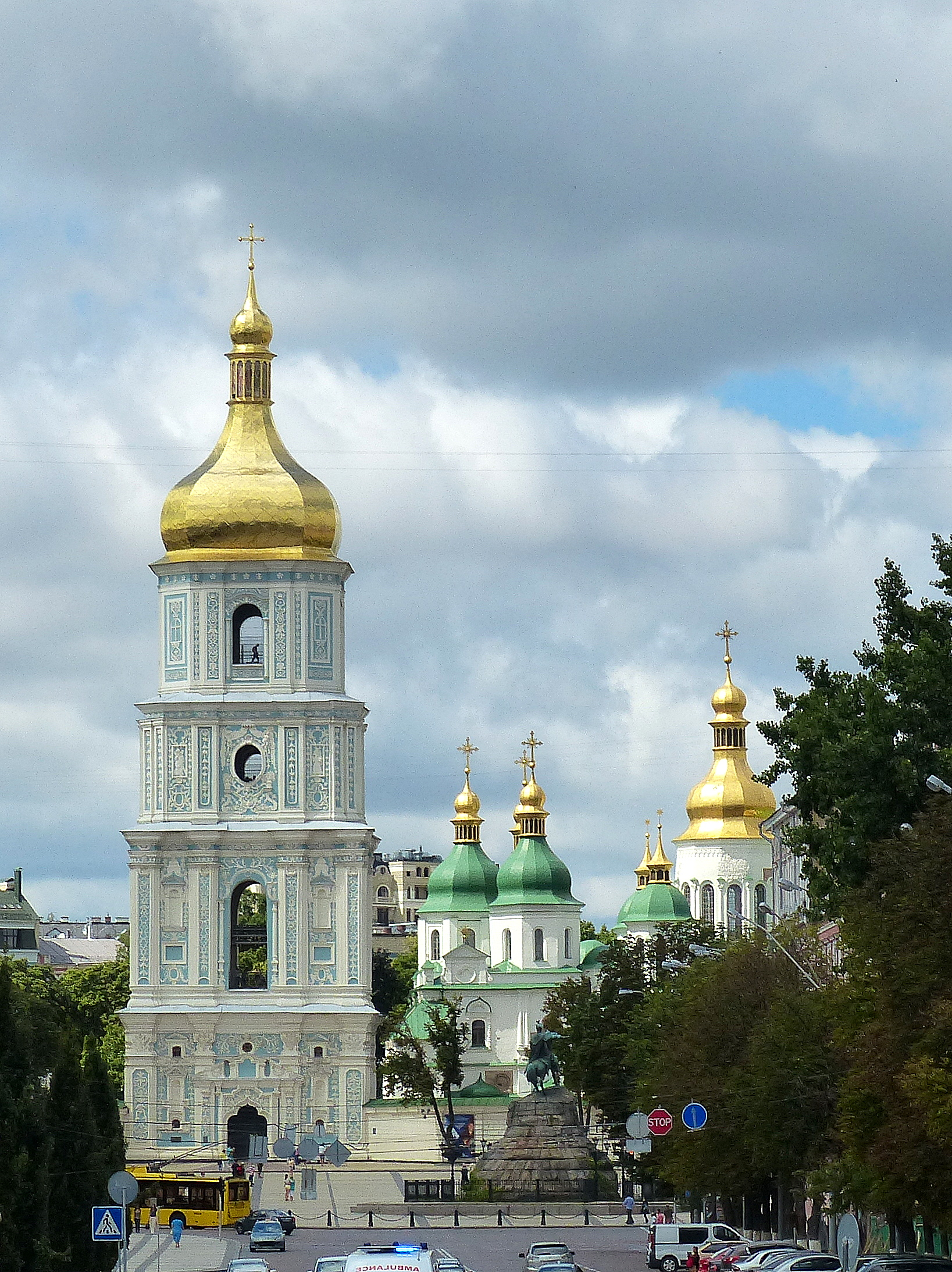
View from beyond Sofiiska Square

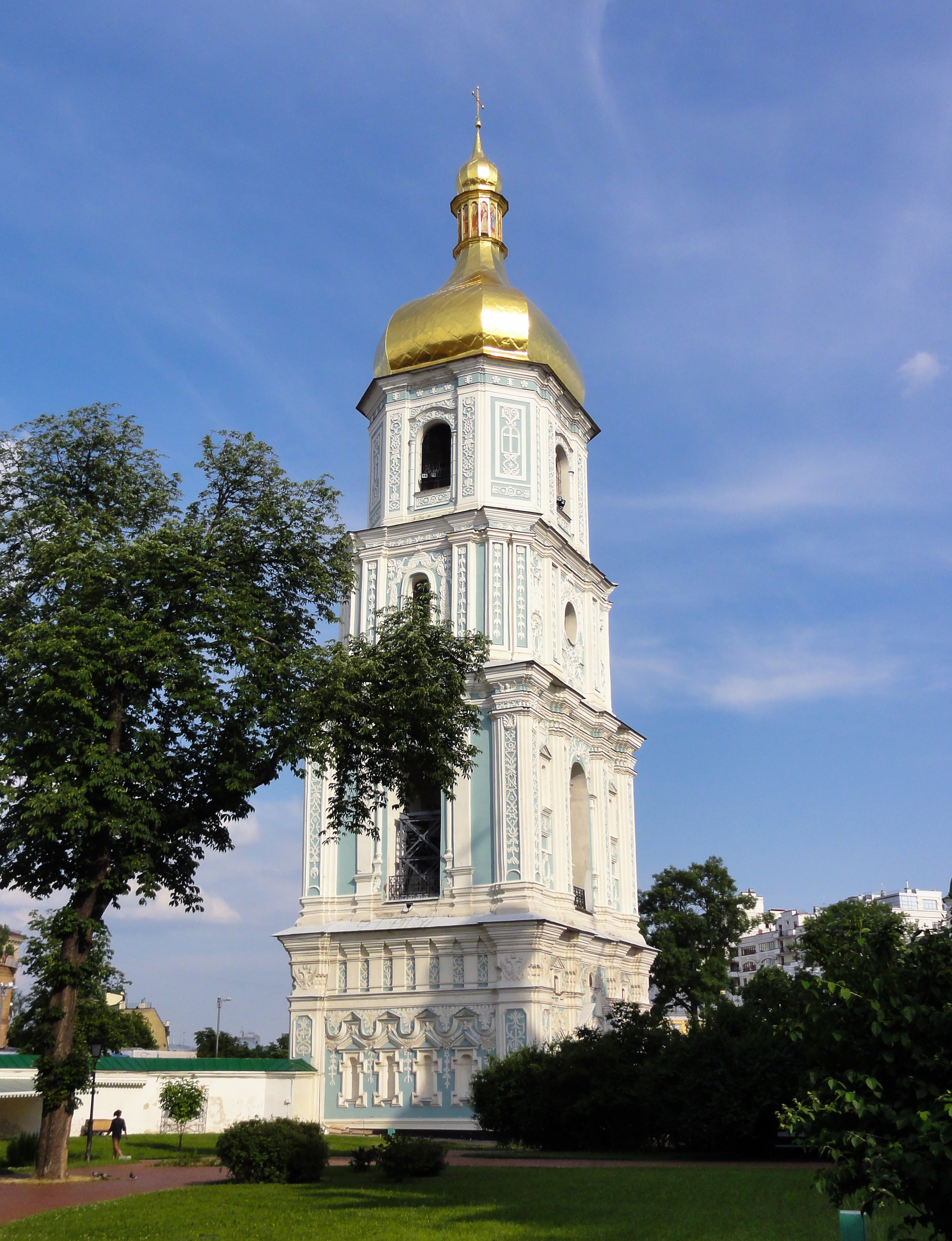
The bell tower viewed from inside the complex

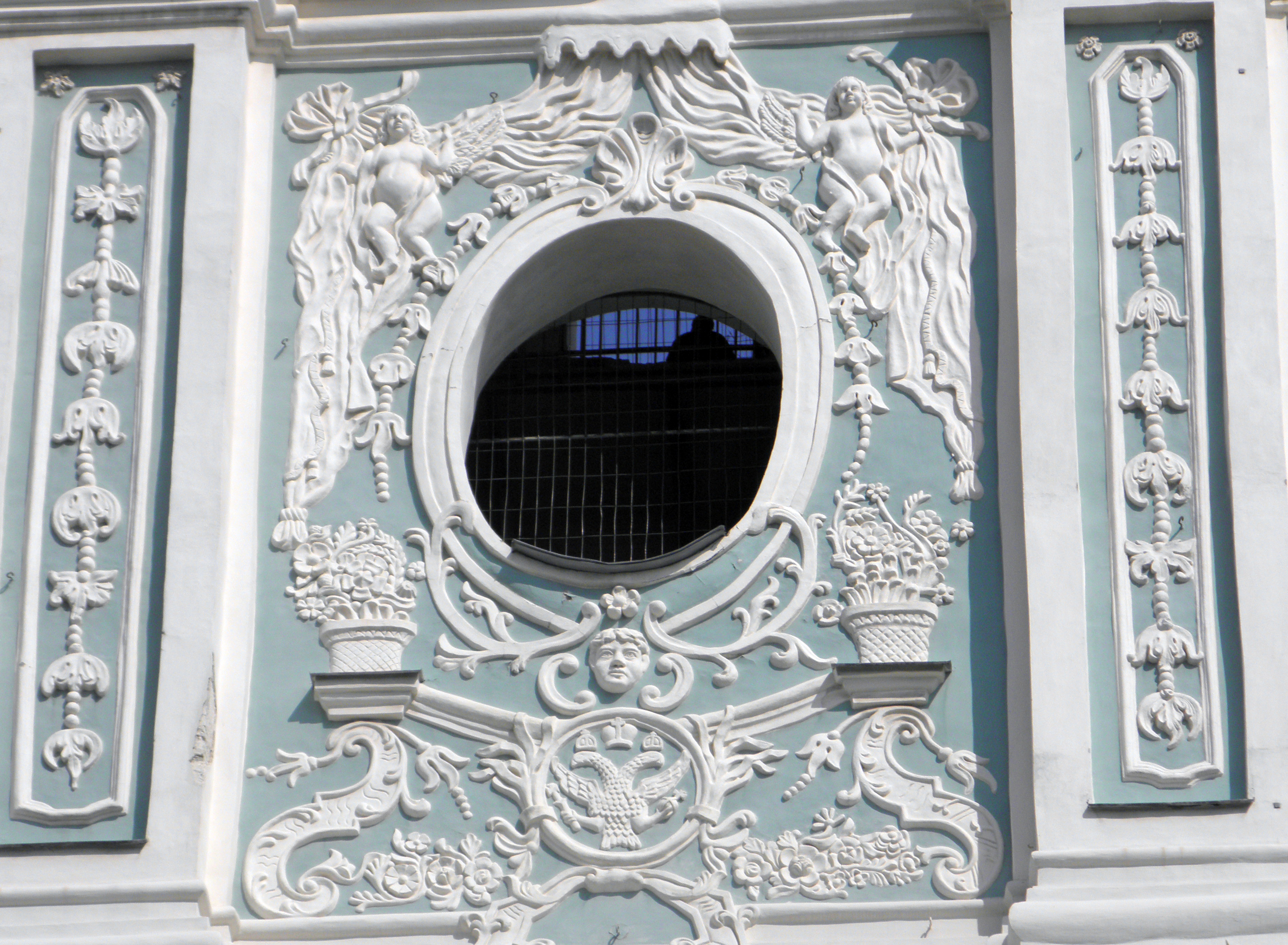
Ornamentation around an opening in the 2nd tier of the building

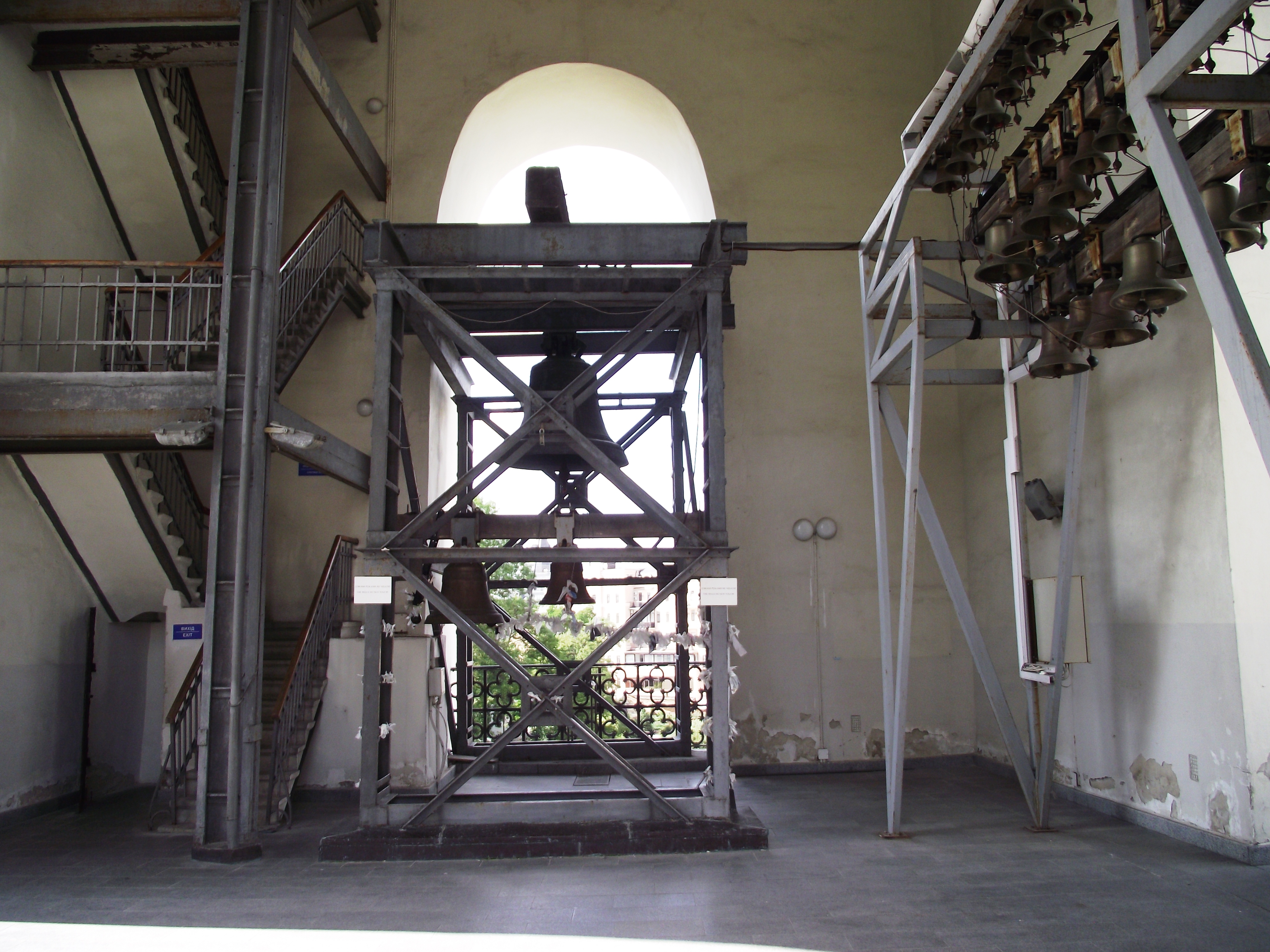
The bells inside the tower

=== Metropolitan’s House ===
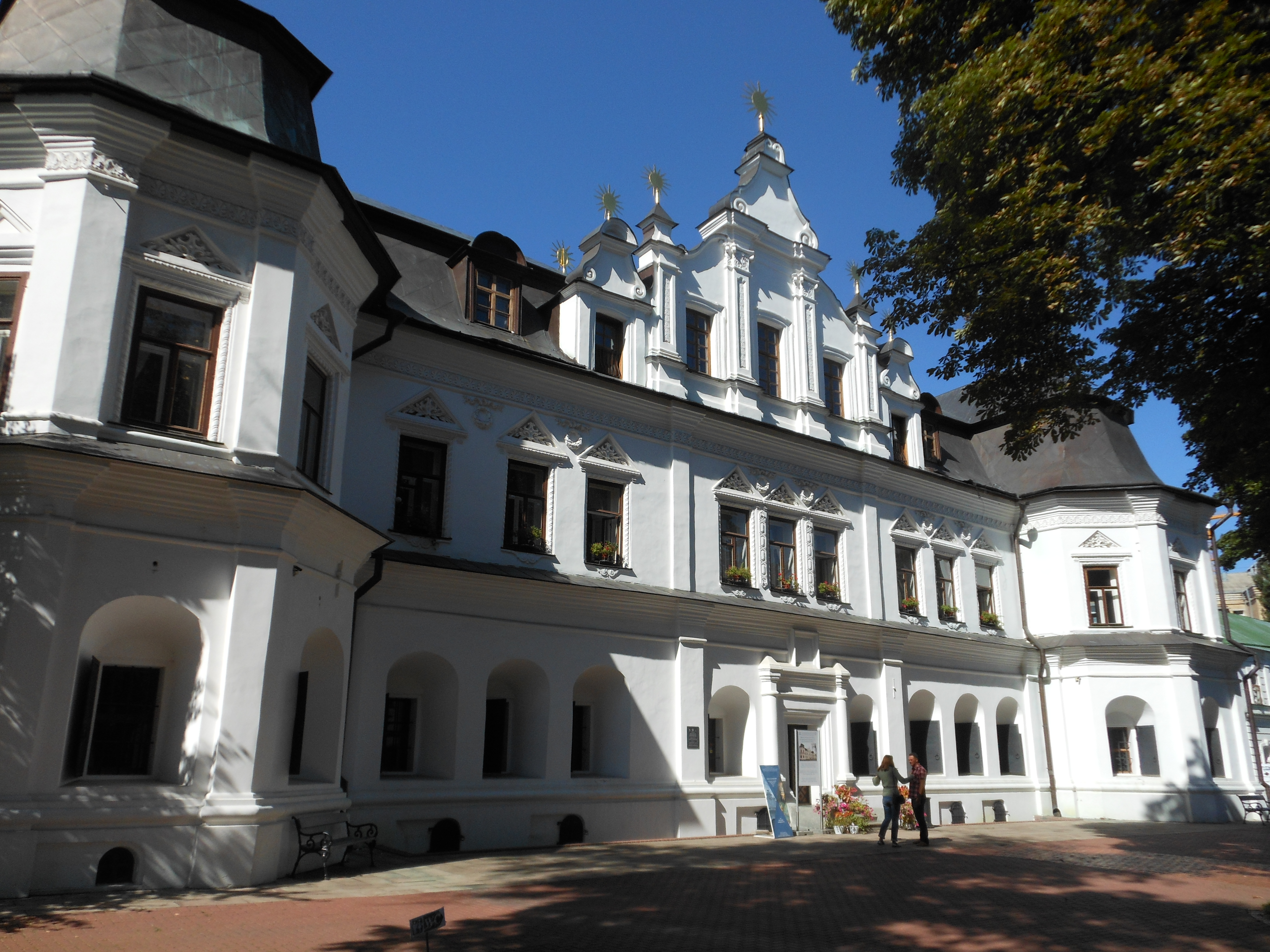
The Metropolitan's House

Due to its rich architectural forms and the quality of the decor, the Metropolitan's House is among the finest examples of 18th-century Ukrainian architecture.

A 1695 map of Kyiv shows that a wooden residence once existed in the southwestern part of the monastery courtyard. It was lost during the fire of 1697. A single-storied stone residence was built between 1722 and 1730, with a second floor being built at a later date. The construction was completed with an upper floor and pediments on the eastern and western facades. In the 19th century, a double-storey annex and a balcony were added to the west wall. The western façade overlooked the metropolitan's courtyard which had private gates into the city; these became redundant during the 19th century when Kyiv's street plan was revised. The courtyard was then made into a garden.

The Metropolitan's House is a rectangular building with two polygonal projections on the east facade. The first two floors were built at different times, and this reflected in their architectural styles. The ground floor is typical of late 17th-century Ukrainian architecture—there are side rooms off a large main entrance hall, and semicircular windows set in embrasures within the thick walls. Both floors have decorative cornices. Along the exterior walls there are vertical pilasters. On the outside, the first floor windows are decorated with plaster-ornamented pediments, and plaster wreaths and ribbons.

The medieval residence contained the library and the scriptorium, and acted as the administrative centre for the metropolitan. After the episcopal see moved from Kyiv in 1300, it remained the metropolitan's official residence. After the First World War, various institutions and organizations were located there, including the Department of Confessions of the Ukrainian People’s Republic (1918–1919), the Ukrainian Architectural Institute (1918–1924), and the Academy of Architecture (1944–1962). The building was restored between 2006 and 2009.

=== Refectory ===
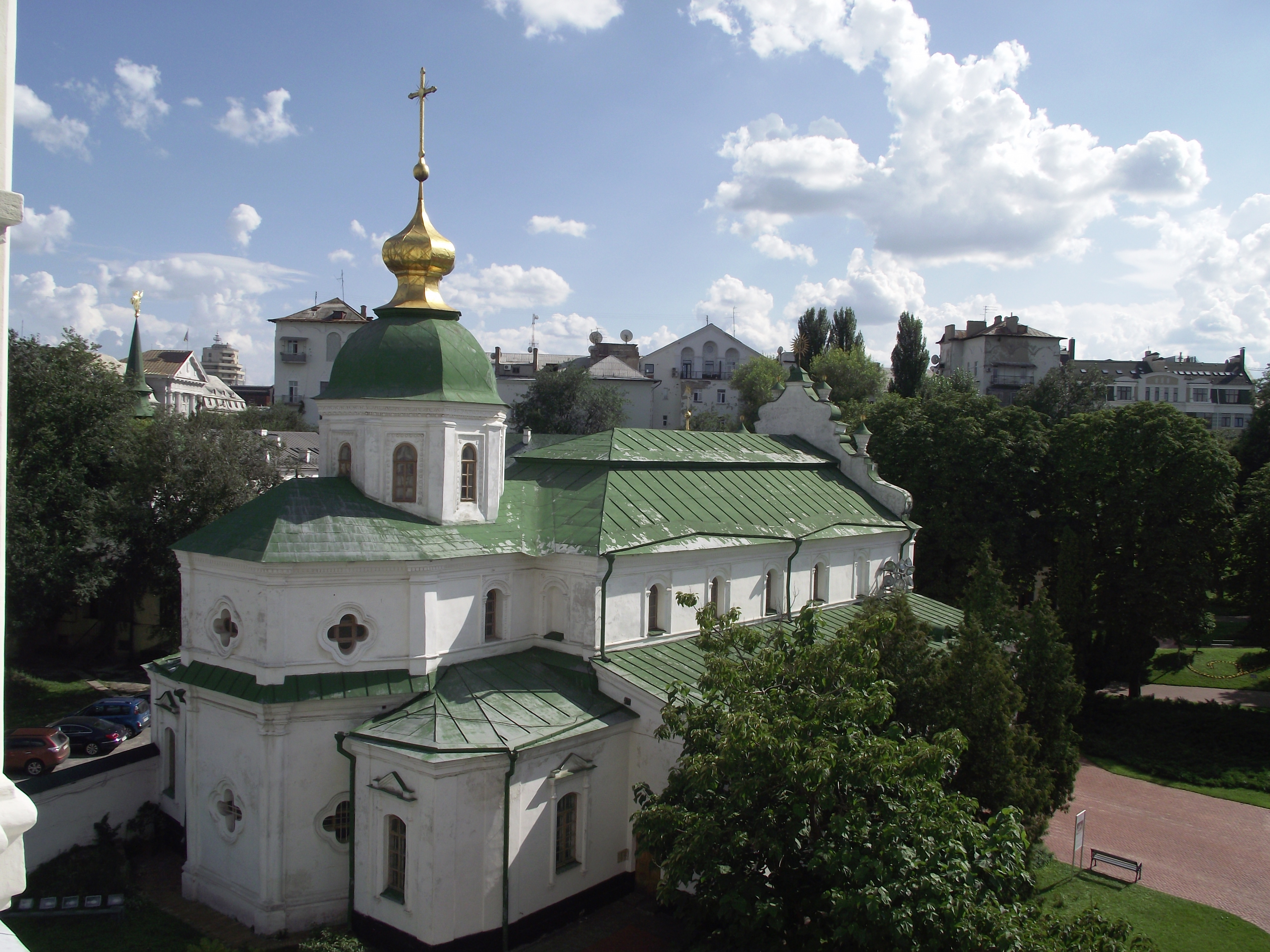
Refectory of St Sophia Cathedral

A wooden refectory and church was first mentioned in 1682. Ushakov's plan of 1695 depicts a building with a brick lower floor, a wooden upper floor, and a barrel-shaped shingle roof. The building was destroyed in the fire of 1697. Between 1722 and 1730 the refectory and church was rebuilt, using the old cellars and the walls above them. The lower floor of the Refectory of St Sophia Cathedral housed the refectory with the Church of the Resurrection of St. Lazarus and a kitchen; the upper floor housed store rooms. In around 1769, the refectory was redesigned, and a pediment was added onto the western facade.

There was no longer any need for the refectory after the monastery was dissolved, and it was redesigned to be used instead of the cathedral during the coldest months. The church, which was called 'Warm Sophia"' was consecrated on 12 November 1822. In 1872, the church new aisles were added and the tower was dismantled. The building has been restored in several stages since the 1970s. The 18th-century kitchen, stair tower, and western vestibule have been rebuilt, and the building adapted to be used as a museum.

=== Zaborovsky Gate ===
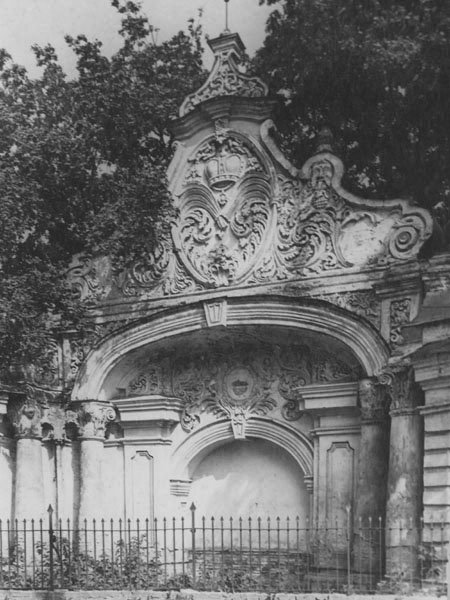
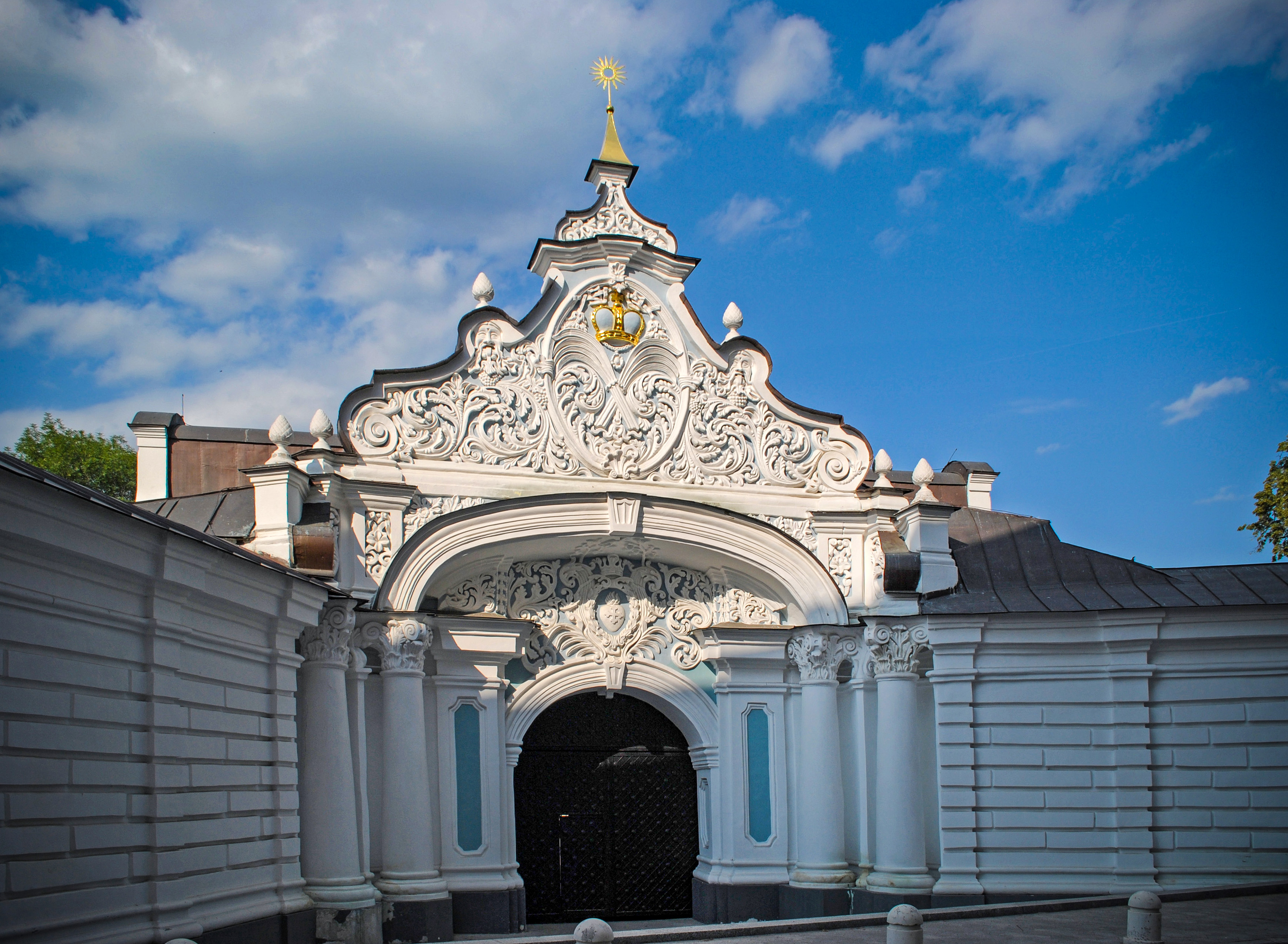
The Zaborovsky Gate (left) in the early years of the 20th century; (right) in 2013 (restored)

The 18th-century Zaborovsky Gate was built into the boundary wall of the monastery where the wall followed the modern St. Georgievsky Lane. The gate stands opposite the western facade of the Metropolitan House.

The gate was the Metropolitan's main entrance to his residence. It was built in 1746–1748 by Schädel, and was commissioned and financed by Metropolitan Raphael Zaborovsky. The original side buildings built by Zaborovsky were demolished in 1822–1823.

The gate was bricked up in the 1920s, and its façade was altered. The former courtyard was redesigned as a garden that remained hidden from view. It was restored between 1946 and 1948. Writing in the 1930s, the Ukrainian art historian Fedir Ernst described the architecture of the Zaborovsky Gate as being: "decorated below with a complex Baroque system of columns and pilasters, two arches and a magnificent pediment with wavy volute lines, the gate is particularly notable for its luxurious molding, which completely fills the entire field of its facade wall with acanthus designs, theatrical masks, oval cartouches with crowns and a flaming heart., rosettes, etc.."

=== Other buildings ===
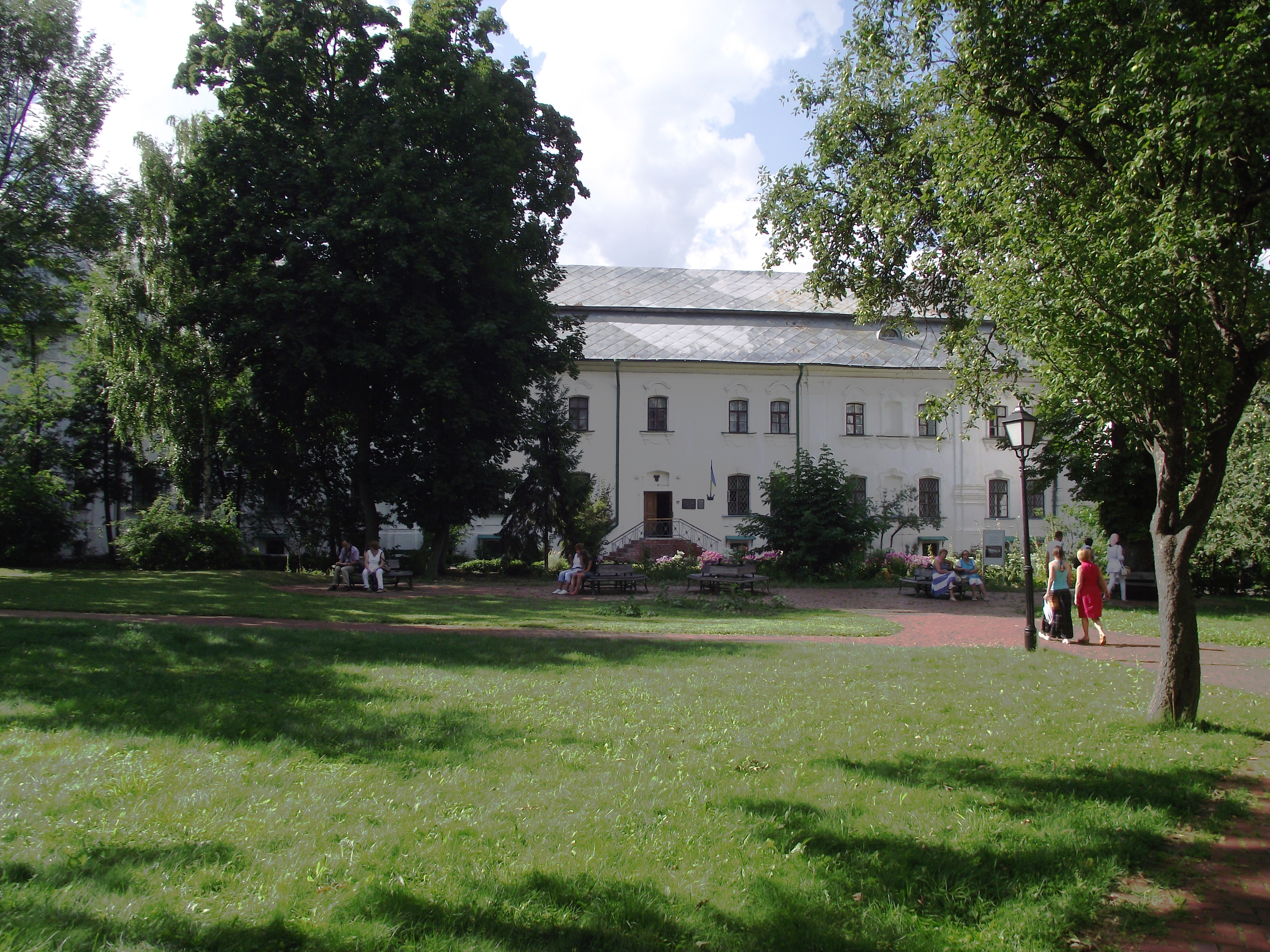
The Bursa

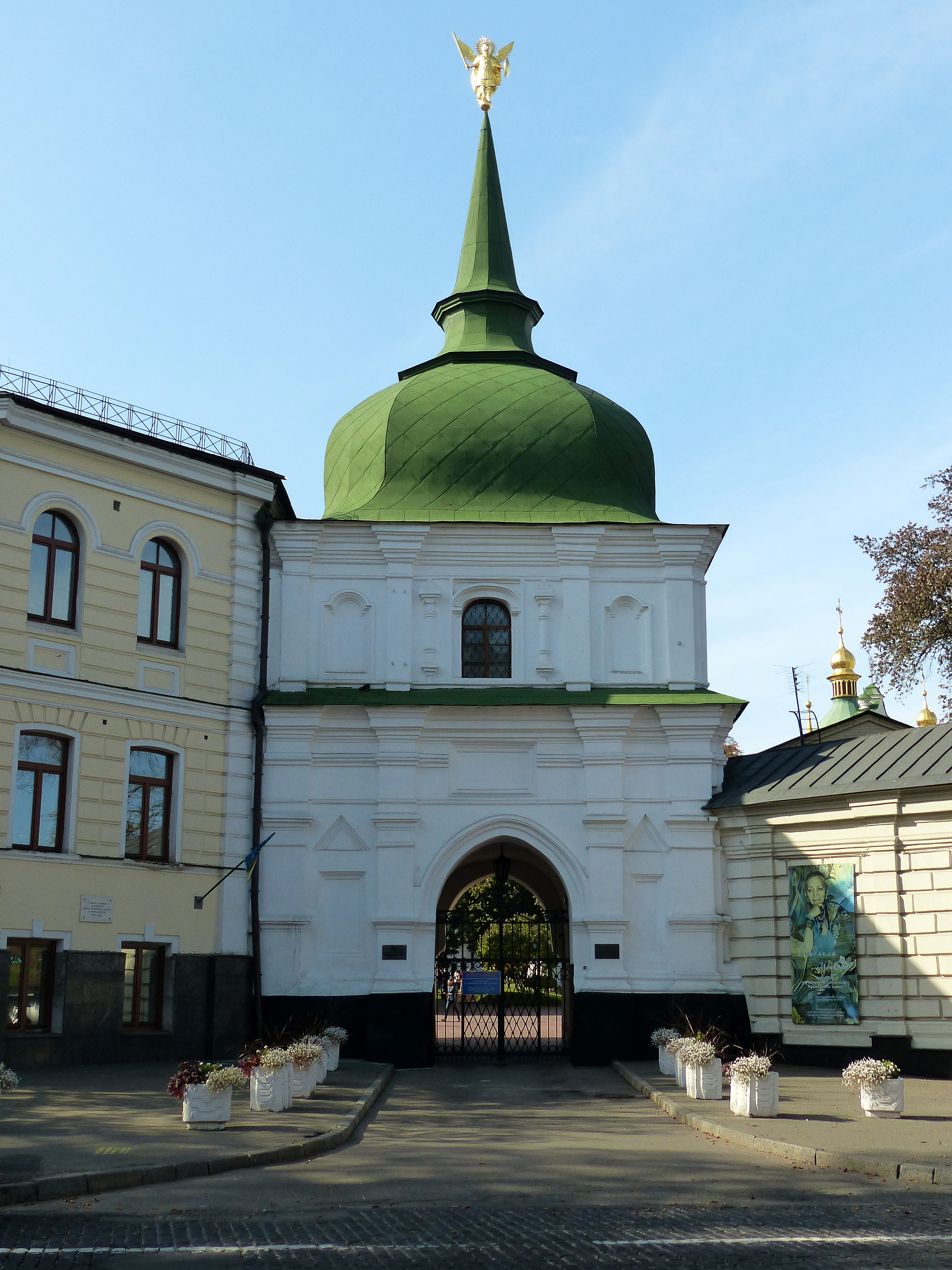
The Southern Tower

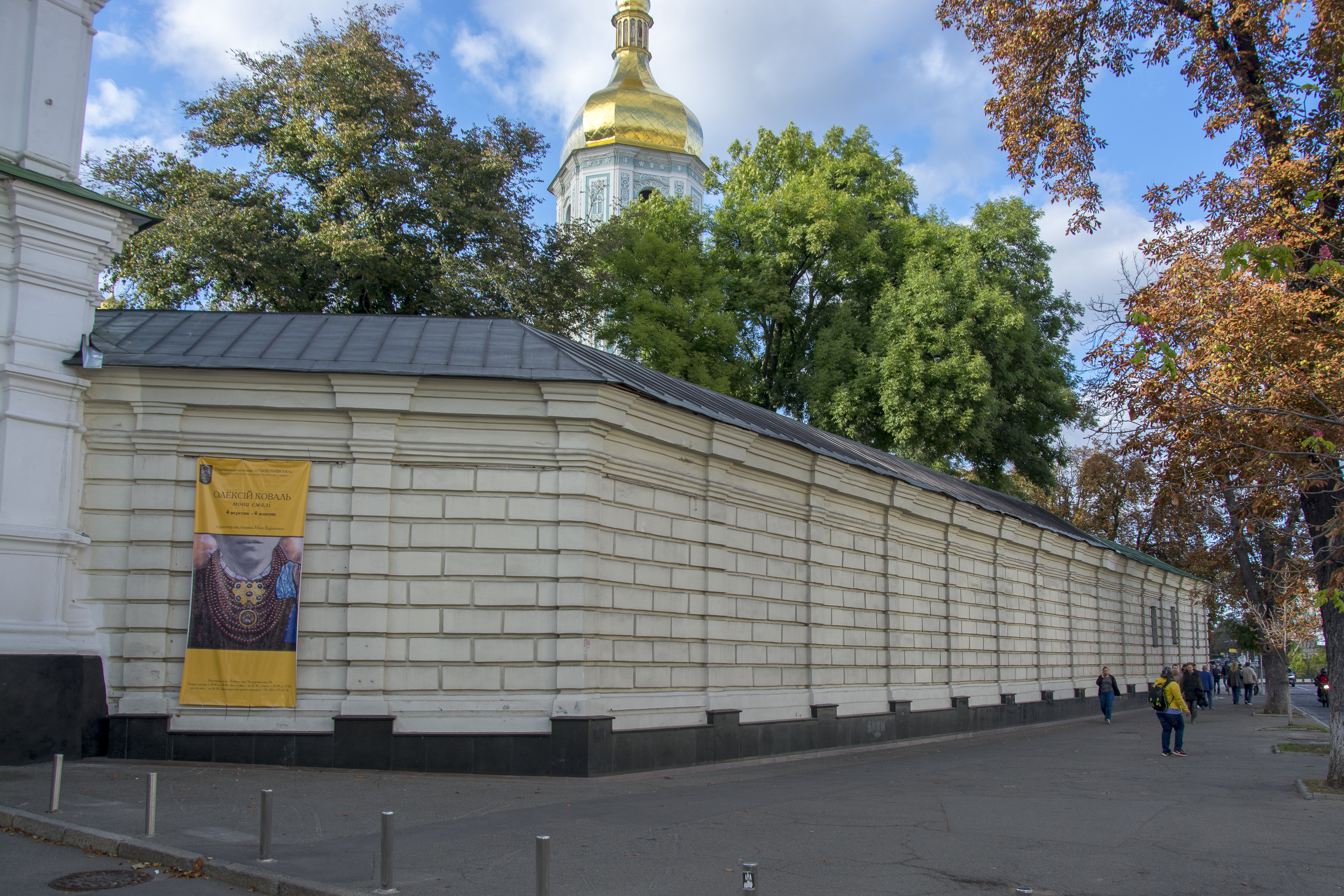
The monastery walls

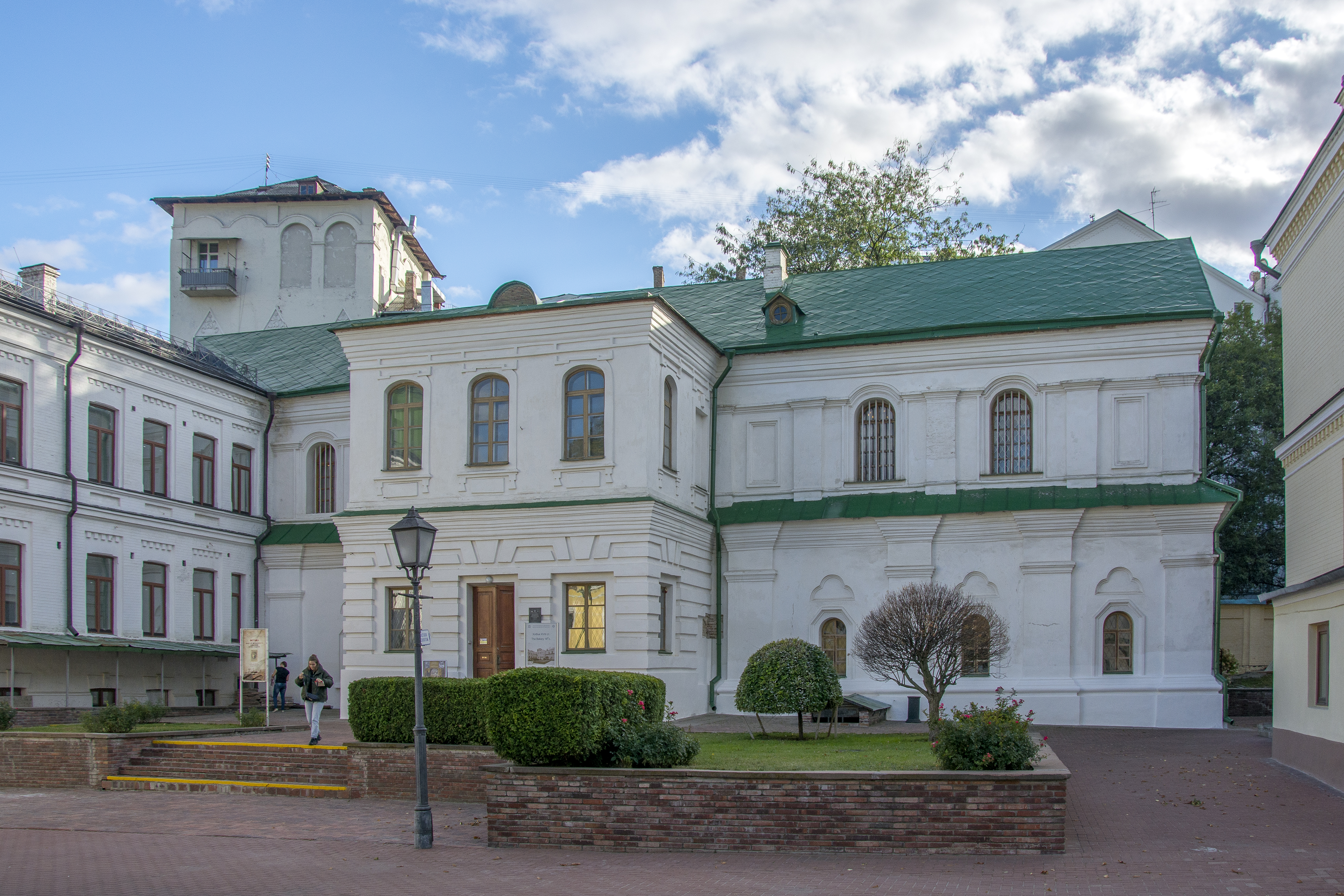
The Breadhouse (Consistory)

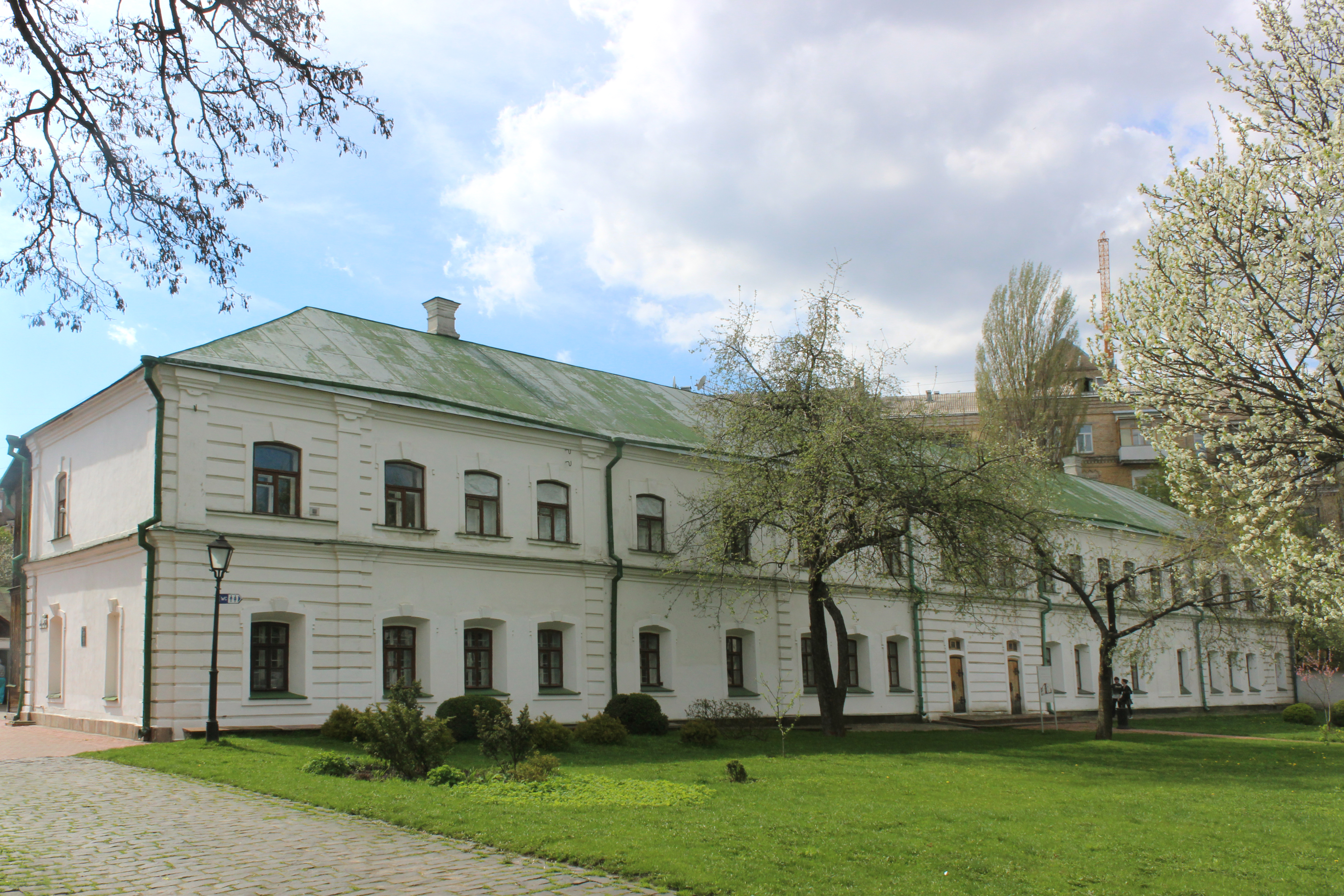
The Brotherhood building

== In culture ==
In 1885 a folk Christmas song (koliadka) telling the story of the construction of the cathedral was recorded by the Ukrainian ethnographer Mykhailo Zubrytskyi in the village of Mshanets (now part of Sambir Raion, Lviv Oblast). In 1889 the song's text was published by the Ukrainian poet Ivan Franko in Kievskaia starina magazine, and was later noticed by the Ukrainian historian Mykhailo Hrushevskyi. The song can be dated to the 17th century, as it contains a precise description of the cathedral's architecture before its later reconstruction.

The cathedral has served as the backdrop to Bouquet Kyiv Stage, the annual outdoor arts festival started by the entrepreneur Evgeni Utkin. It has drawn Ukrainian artists and musical acts such as DakhaBrakha, and the concert pianist Antonii Baryshevskyi.

== See also ==
- List of World Heritage Sites in Ukraine

== Sources ==
- Berezhynsky, Volodymyr (1996). "Війни Київської Русі з печенями" [Wars of Kievan Rus' with the Pechenegs] (PDF). Ukrainian Historical Journal (in Ukrainian). 6. Kyiv, Ukraine: 115–119. ISSN 0130-5247.
- Boeck, Elena (2009). "Simulating the Hippodrome: The Performance of Power in Kiev's St. Sophia". The Art Bulletin. 91 (3): 283–301.
- Bon, Oleksandr (2020). "Sofia Commission of VUAK: Archaeological research in Sofia Kyivskaya in the 1920s" (PDF). Documentary and archaeological materials Pricarpathian and Volini (in Ukrainian). Kyiv, Ukraine: Borys Hrinchenko Kyiv University: 458–466. doi:10.33402/mdapv.2020-24-458-466. ISSN 2223-1218.
- Galganova, O.O. (2011). Сім чудес України [The Seven Wonders of Ukraine] (PDF) (in Ukrainian). Kyiv, Ukraine: Ministry of Culture of Ukraine State Institution “National Parliamentary Library of Ukraine”.
- Heydenstein, Reynold (1874). Antonovich, Volodymyr; Ternovsky, F. (eds.). Сборник материалов для исторической топографии Киева и его окрестностей [A Collection of Materials for the Historical Topography of Kiev and its Environs] (in Russian). Kyiv, Ukraine.
- Kornienko, Vyacheslav Vasilyovych (2010). Корпус графіті Софії Київської (XI - початок XVIII ст.) [The Corpus of Graffiti of St. Sophia of Kyiv (11th–early 18th centuries)] (in Ukrainian). Vol. Part II: Chapel of the Holy Apostles Peter and Paul. Kyiv, Ukraine: Institute of Ukrainian Archeography and Source Studies.
- Nikitenko, Nadiia M. (2008). Собор Святой Софии в Киеве [Saint Sofia Cathedral in Kyiv] (in Ukrainian). Moscow, Russia: Northern Pilgrim. ISBN 978-5-94431-278-5.
- Nikitenko, Nadiia M.; Kornienko, Vyacheslav (2012). Давніші графіті софії київської та час її створення [The ancient graffiti of Sofia of Kyiv and the time of its creation] (PDF) (in Ukrainian). Kyiv, Ukraine: National Academy of Sciences of Ukraine. Archived from the original (PDF) on 9 May 2018.
- Nikitenko, Nadiia M. (2022). Saint Sophia of Kyiv (in Ukrainian and English). Kyiv, Ukraine: National Academy of Sciences of Ukraine.
- Noble, John (1996). Russia, Ukraine & Belarus: a Lonely Planet Travel Survival Kit. Oakland, California: Lonely Planet. ISBN 9780864423207.
- Orlenko, Mykola; Ivashko, Yulia; Ding, Yang (2022). "Fresco wall painting and its regional modifications" (PDF). International Journal of Conservation Science. 13 (1): 57–72. ISSN 2067-533X.
- Plokhy, Serhii (2015). The Gates of Europe: A History of Ukraine. London: Penguin Books. ISBN 978-0-465-09346-5.
- Powstenko, Olexa (1954). "The Sarcophagus of Yaroslav and Other Tombs". The Cathedral of St. Sofia in Kiev. New York: The Ukrainian Academy of Arts and Sciences in the US. Also here.
- Prelovska, I.M. (2017). "Деякі обставини утворення державного заповідника "софія київська" у 1930-х pp" [Some circumstances of the formation of the State Reserve “Sofia Kyivska” in the 1930s] (PDF). Vita Antiqua (in Ukrainian): 20–27.
- Totska, F. (1975). Мозаики и фрески софии киевской [Mosaics and Frescoes of St. Sophia`s Cathedral, Kyiv] (PDF) (in Ukrainian, Russian, and English). Kyiv, Ukraine: Mistetstvo Publishers.
- Zabuzhko, Oksana (2011). Вибране листування на тлі доби: 1992 – 2002 : з доданими творами, коментарями, причинками до біографії та іншими документами [Selected correspondence against the background of the era: 1992 – 2002 : with added works, comments, reasons for biography and other documents] (in Ukrainian). Kyiv, Ukraine: Visoka polytsia. p. 19.
