= List of Ukrainian Baroque stone churches =

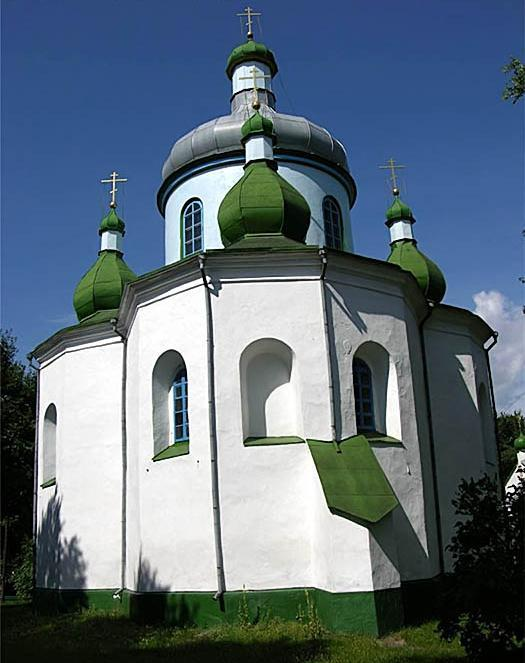
Since the 17th century, pear-shaped domes have been widespread in Ukrainian and Russian lands. The four-petal defensive church in Olevsk (1595) also received a pear-shaped dome, popular in the Dnieper region.

Ukrainian Baroque, also known as Cossack Baroque, is an architectural style that was widespread in the 17th–18th centuries, primarily within the Cossack Hetmanate. It combined the features of the late Renaissance and Baroque construction of neighboring countries with exclusively Ukrainian forms of folk wooden church architecture. At the end of the 17th and in the 18th centuries, local Ukrainian architecture felt a significant influence of the contemporary Russian Baroque, first Naryshkin, and then Elizabethan.

Churches in the Ukrainian Baroque style were built in various shapes and sizes. Typical buildings of multi-part multi-dome composition prevailed (three-, five-, seven- and nine-part, in the form of wooden churches), which differed only in decor. Large four- and six-column hall multi-nave cathedrals, small column-less churches and churches of original, unique composition are also known.

The list includes all of the known stone churches in the Ukrainian Baroque style, both preserved and lost. Destroyed buildings are highlighted in gray. (Note: Churches that were rebuilt in the modern era with a similar design to the original that incorporate little to no original structure (e.g., St Michael's Golden-Domed Monastery in Kyiv) are marked as destroyed, but churches that preserve the original structure that lost their Baroque elements (e.g., Boris and Gleb Cathedral in Chernihiv) are not.)

== Ukraine ==
=== Cherkasy Oblast ===
Name	Location	Construction or reconstruction date	Notes	Photo
St. Elijah Church	Subotiv	1653	Small church with features of Belarusian Baroque. Built by Bohdan Khmelnytsky and housed his tomb. The bell tower was built in the 19th century.	
Transfiguration Church of Krasnohiria Monastery	Zolotonosha	1767–1771	Three-part three-dome church. Built by Ivan Grigorovich-Barsky. Incorporates features of Elizabethan Baroque. Damaged in the 1930s and during World War II, and reconstructed in the 1960s.	

=== Chernihiv Oblast ===
Name	Location	Construction or reconstruction date	Notes	Photo
Cathedral of the Life-Giving Trinity	Baturyn	Second half of 17th century	Five-dome church. Built at the expense of Ivan Samoylovych and expanded at the expense of Ivan Mazepa. Burnt down on 13 November 1708 during the Sack of Baturyn. Another wooden church with the same name was later built in a different place and closed in 1787.	
Annunciation Church	Berezna	1778	Cruciform nine-part one-dome church. Destroyed in the Soviet period.	
Trinity Cathedral	Borzna	Before 1639; 1789	Five-part one-dome church. Destroyed in 1967.	
Boris and Gleb Cathedral	Chernihiv	1700–1702	The medieval church was rebuilt at the expense of Ivan Mazepa. The two-story bell tower that was built in the 1670s was destroyed in the 1960s when the medieval look was returned to the cathedral.	
Church of All Saints in the Chernihiv Collegium	Chernihiv	End of 17th century; 1700–1702	Built by Ivan Mazepa. Two-story church with a narrow bell tower on top. The decor features elements of the Naryshkin Baroque.	
Church of the Presentation of the Virgin Mary of the Trinity Monastery	Chernihiv	1677–1679	Two-dome refectory church with a rectangular altar section and exterior features of Moscow Baroque. Its 18th-century iconostasis was built by the order of Ivan Mazepa.	
Dormition Cathedral of Yelets Dormition Monastery	Chernihiv	1670s–1680s	The medieval church was rebuilt by Theodosius of Chernihiv and Ioanikiy (Galyatovsky) at the expense of numerous noble families, including the Lyzohubs and the Baryatynskys. Three cupolas were added above the narthex (of which two have been preserved), and one more above the altar. It was expanded in 1689. The bell tower was built in 1670–1675. The iconostasis was made in 1669–1670 and lost in the 1920s.	
Piatnytska Church	Chernihiv	End of 17th century	The medieval church was rebuilt in the Baroque style. It was greatly damaged during World War II, and consequently reconstructed by Pyotr Baranovsky to its 13th-century appearance.	
St. Catherine's Church	Chernihiv	1696–1715	Cruciform nine-part five-dome church. Built at the expense of the Lyzohub family. The iconostasis was destroyed in the Soviet period.	
St. Elijah Church of the Trinity Monastery	Chernihiv	17th–18th centuries	The medieval one-dome church was rebuilt on the exterior, with added domes above the narthex and the apse. The two-story bell tower was built later. The iconostasis was made in the 1770s.	
Saints Peter and Paul Church of Yelets Dormition Monastery	Chernihiv	1680s	Refectory church. Lost its original appearance when it was rebuilt in the end of the 18th century.	
Holy Trinity Cathedral of the Trinity Monastery	Chernihiv	1679–1696	Originally built by Lazar Baranovych, since 1688 by Ivan Baptista at the expense of Ivan Mazepa, and later by a group headed by Osip Startsev. It was a large three-nave seven-dome church until four of its domes were destroyed. The cathedral was reconstructed in the 1980s–1990s. The seven-tier iconostasis of 1695 was destroyed in the Soviet period.	
St. George's Cathedral of Danivka Monastery	Danivka	1741–1754	Three-part three-dome three-apse church.	
Intercession Church	Dihtiarivka	1708–1710	Five-part five-dome church in with features similar to Naryshkin Baroque. Built at the expense of Ivan Mazepa. It was heavily damaged during World War II, and partially disassembled. The church is being reconstructed.	
Dormition Church of the Hustynia Monastery	Hustynia	Beginning of the 18th century	Cruciform one-dome refectory church. Built by Ivan Mazepa.	
St. Nicholas the Wondermaker Church of the Hustynia Monastery	Hustynia	1670s	Gate church, fully rebuilt in the 19th century. Only the lower parts of the current building preserve the original structure.	
Sts. Peter and Paul Church of the Hustynia Monastery	Hustynia	First quarter of the 18th century	Cruciform nine-part five-dome gate church.	
Trinity Cathedral of the Hustynia Monastery	Hustynia	1674–1675	Cruciform nine-part five-dome church built at the expense of Ivan Samoylovych. The 18th-century five-tier iconostasis was destroyed in the Soviet period.	
Cathedral of the Nativity of Virgin Mary	Kozelets	1752–1763	Large five-dome church with elements of Elizabethan Baroque. Built by Andrey Kvasov and Ivan Grigorovich-Barsky at the expense of Natalia Rozumovska. The four-story bell tower was built together with the cathedral. The iconostasis was made in the 1760s.	
St. Nicholas Church	Kozelets	1784	Cruciform one-dome three-apse church. Built by Kyrylo Tarakh-Tarlovsky.	
Intercession Church of Ladan Monastery	Ladan	Before 1763	Three-part three-dome church with a separate bell tower built in 19th century. The cathedral was distorted and the bell tower was destroyed in the Soviet period. The cathedral is being reconstructed.	
Three Holy Hierarchs Church	Lemeshi	1755	One-dome tetraconch church, transitional between Baroque and Neoclassicist styles.	
Transfiguration (Trinity) Cathedral of Maksaky Monastery	Maksaky	1642–1650s	Three-nave one-dome (three-dome after 17th century) church with elements of Belarusian Baroque. Established by Adam Kisiel. Destroyed in the late 1940s.	
Presentation of the Virgin Mary Church of Maksaky Monastery	Maksaky	1690s	One-dome refectory church. Destroyed in the 1930s.	
Annunciation Cathedral of the Annunciation Monastery	Nizhyn	1702–1716	Large five-dome church with influence of Russian Baroque by G. Ustinov. The façades were rebuilt in the 19th century in the classicist style.	
Church of John the Apostle	Nizhyn	Before 1752	Two-story one-dome church. Belongs to the tetraconch type.	
Epiphany Church	Nizhyn	1721	Rebuilt, distorted in the Soviet period.	
Holy Exaltation of the Cross Church	Nizhyn	1775	One-dome church. Houses the tomb of Petro Rozumovsky. The winter church and the bell tower were built in 1860.	
Intercession Church	Nizhyn	1757–1765	One-dome tetrachonch church. The bell tower was built in the 19th century.	
Presentation of the Virgin Mary Church of the Presentation of the Virgin Mary Monastery	Nizhyn	1775–1778	One-dome church. The bell tower was built in the 19th century.	
St. Michael's Church	Nizhyn	1719–1729	Small three-part one-dome church. One of the three Greek churches of Nizhyn.	
St. Nicholas Cathedral	Nizhyn	1655–1658	Large cruciform nine-part five-dome church. Much of the exterior decoration has been reconstructed hypothetically. It iconostasis was made in the 1730s and destroyed in the Soviet period. This church is the prototype of Ukrainian Baroque cruciform five-dome churches.	
Sts. Pantaleon and Basil Church	Nizhyn	1788	Three-part one-dome church.	
Transfiguration Church	Nizhyn	1757	Cruciform three-dome church. It was heavily damaged during World War II, and is currently under reconstruction.	
Trinity Church	Nizhyn	1727–1733	Small cruciform one-dome church. Gained classicist features in the 1830s. One of the three Greek churches of Nizhyn.	
Dormition Cathedral	Novhorod-Siverskyi	17th–18th centuries	Nine-part five-dome church. The bell tower was built in the 19th century.	
Exaltation of the Cross Church	Novhorod-Siverskyi	1715	Three-part one-dome church with elements of Petrine Baroque. Destroyed in the 1930s.	
Resurrection Church	Novhorod-Siverskyi	1707	Originally a three-part one-dome church. Rebuilt, and finally destroyed in the 1930s.	
Sts. Peter and Paul Church of the Transfiguration Monastery	Novhorod-Siverskyi	Mid 17th century	Cruciform one-dome refectory church.	
Transfiguration Cathedral of the Transfiguration Monastery	Novhorod-Siverskyi	Before 1678	The medieval church was rebuilt into the Ukrainian Baroque style. It was disassembled and a new classicist church with a design by Giacomo Quarenghi was built in its place in 1791–1806.	
Cathedral of St. Nicholas the Wondermaker of Krupytskyi Monastery	Osich	c. 1680	Cruciform nine-part five-dome church. Built at the expense of Ivan Domontovych. Destroyed in the 1930s together with its 18th-century five-tier iconostasis.	
St. Michael's Church	Polonky	c. 1720	Originally a three-part one-dome church. Built at the expense of Oleksandr Shylo. Two more domes were built in the 1760s–1770s above the narthex and the apse.	
St. Nicholas Church	Pryluky	1705–1720	Hall church with an elongated sanctuary and a bell tower. Built at the expense of the polkovnyk Hnat Galagan.	
Transfiguration Cathedral	Pryluky	1705–1720	Nine-part five-dome church. Built at the expense of Hnat Galagan.	
Cathedral of St. Nicholas the Wondermaker of Rykhly Monastery	Rykhly	1754–1760	Cruciform nine-part five-dome church with a large central dome. Built at the expense of the brigadiers F. Kachenovsky and P. Chyzhevsky. Destroyed in 1930.	
Church of St. Nicholas the Wondermaker of Rykhly Monastery	Rykhly	1757	Small three-part one-dome church. Built at the expense of F. Kachenovsky and P. Chyzhevsky. Destroyed in the 1930s.	
Church of the Nativity of John the Baptist of Rykhly Monastery	Rykhly	1767	Five-part three-dome gate church with elements of Elizabethan Baroque. Destroyed in the 1930s.	
Resurrection Church	Sedniv	1690–1696	Cruciform nine-part one-dome church. Built by Yakiv Lyzohub. The bell tower was built in the 19th century.	
Resurrection Church	Sosnytsia	1756	Five-part three-dome church with Provincial Baroque façades. Destroyed in the 1930s.	
Trinity Church	Sosnytsia	1702	Three-part three-dome church with elements of Naryshkin Baroque. Built at the expense of the merchant Hryhoriy Korenko. Destroyed in the 1950s.	

=== Dnipropetrovsk Oblast ===
Name	Location	Construction or reconstruction date	Notes	Photo
Dormition Church	Kytaihorod	1754	Three-part five-dome church.	
St. Barbara's Church	Kytaihorod	1756–1796	Combines features of a church, bell tower, and defensive tower. Built by the order of Pavlo Yefremovych Semenov.	
St. Nicholas Church	Kytaihorod	1757	One-dome round church.	

=== Donetsk Oblast ===
Name	Location	Construction or reconstruction date	Notes	Photo
St. Nicholas Church of Sviatohirsk Lavra	Sviatohirsk	1680s	Partially rebuilt in 1851.	

=== Kharkiv Oblast ===
Name	Location	Construction or reconstruction date	Notes	Photo
Dormition Church	Balakliia	End of 18th century	One-dome church with a separate bell tower. Destroyed intentionally in 1948.	
Transfiguration Cathedral	Izium	1681	Five-part five-dome church. Distorted by construction in 1902–1903, but subsequently restored to original form in the 1950s. The iconostasis made in 1765 was destroyed in the Soviet period.	
Church of the Nativity of Jesus	Kharkiv	1783	Five-part five-dome church with elements of Provincial Baroque. It was expanded in the 19th century and destroyed the Soviet period.	
Intercession Cathedral of the Intercession Monastery	Kharkiv	1689	Two-story three-part three-dome church with a tent-roofed bell tower.	
St. Nicholas the Wondermaker Church	Kharkiv	1764–1770	Three-part three-dome church with features of Naryshkin Baroque. Destroyed in 1886.	
Trinity Church	Kharkiv	1758–1764	Small three-part two-dome church with a separate bell tower. Combined features of Ukrainian and Naryshkin Baroque styles. It was destroyed in the 1850s and replaced by a new church designed by Konstantin Thon.	
Ascension Cathedral of Khorosheve Monastery	Khorosheve	1754–1759	Three-part three-dome church. Expanded to a five-part five-dome church in 1835–1837. Included features of Moscow Baroque. Destroyed in the Soviet period.	
St. George's Church of Kuriazhanka Monastery	Podvirky	End of 17th century – 1709	Two-story one-dome refectory church. Destroyed in the Soviet period when the monastery was turned into the Kuriazhanka Corrective Colony.	
St. Onuphrius Church of Kuriazhanka Monastery	Podvirky	1750–1753	Cruciform one-dome church. Destroyed in the Soviet period.	
Transfiguration Cathedral of Kuriazhanka Monastery	Podvirky	1762	Five-dome (after 19th century — three-dome) church. Partially ruined in the Soviet period and not restored since. Its 18th-century bell tower was destroyed.	
Intercession Church	Vilshany	1769	Three-part church with one two-story dome. Destroyed in the Soviet period.	

=== Kirovohrad Oblast ===
Name	Location	Construction or reconstruction date	Notes	Photo
St. Elijah's Church	Novomyrhorod	1786	Cruciform one-dome church. Its style is transitional between Ukrainian Baroque and Classicism. It is the oldest architectural monument of the oblast.	

=== Kyiv ===
Name	Location	Construction or reconstruction date	Notes	Photo
St. Cyril's Church of St. Cyril's Monastery	Dorohozhychi, Kyiv	1734, 1748–1760	The medieval church was rebuilt by architects Stepan Kovnir and Ivan Grigorovich-Barsky. The original one-dome church was rebuilt into a five-dome one.	
Holy Trinity Church of Kytaiv Monastery	Kytaiv, Kyiv	1755–1767	Big nine-part five-dome church, partially rebuilt in 19th century. The multi-story classicist bell tower was destroyed in the Soviet period.	
Refectory Church of Saint Sophia Cathedral	Old City, Kyiv	1722–1730	One-nave, two-story refectory church. Significantly rebuilt in 19th to early 20th centuries, reconstructed to its original form in 1950s.	
Refectory Church of the Holy Apostle and Evangelist John the Theologian of St. Michael's Golden-Domed Monastery	Old City, Kyiv	1713	One-domed church with a refectory. It was in a neglected state in the Soviet period and restored in the modern times.	
Saint Sophia Cathedral	Old City, Kyiv	17th–18th centuries	Rebuilt by Ivan Mazepa at his own expense. The side galleries of the medieval church were added and crowned with six new domes. Pediments and buttresses were added. The interior decoration of the church was remade. The 18th-century iconostasis is partially preserved. The bell tower (built in 1698–1748) is located separately.	
St. George's Church	Old City, Kyiv	1744–1752	Built at the expense of Elizabeth of Russia. Originally it was a cruciform, nine-part, one-dome church. At the end of the 19th century, the church was completely rebuilt in the Neo-Byzantine style. The church, with its 18th-century iconostasis, was destroyed in 1934.	
St. Michael's Cathedral of St. Michael's Golden-Domed Monastery	Old City, Kyiv	End of 17th century, 1715–1746	The medieval one-dome church was rebuilt in 17th century and became five-domed, and then seven-domed with elements of Elizabethan Baroque in 18th century. Pediments, porches, aisles, and buttresses were added. The three-story bell tower was built in 1716–1719, the cathedral was decorated in mid 18th century, and its iconostases were from 1718, 1732, and beginning of 19th century. The cathedral and the bell tower were entirely ruined in 1935–1937, and restored in the 18th-century form in the 1990s.	
Three Holy Hierarchs Church	Old City, Kyiv	1693–1707	The upper part of the Kievan Rus' church was completely rebuilt at Vasily Kochubey's expense. Before its destruction in 1935, the church had the appearance of a three-part structure with one massive dome. The chancel and bell tower were built in the 18th–19th centuries. When the church was destroyed, so was the iconostasis from the second half of the 18th century.	
Church of All Saints above the Economic Gate of the Kyiv Pechersk Lavra	Pechersk, Kyiv	1690s	Gate five-part five-dome church with an internal gallery. Built by D. Aksamitov at the expense of Ivan Mazepa. The iconostasis was created in the 1740s.	
Church of the Conception of St. Anne of the Kyiv Pechersk Lavra	Pechersk, Kyiv	1679	Small one-dome refectory. Original design distorted by later additions.	
Church of the Nativity of the Blessed Virgin Mary of the Kyiv Pechersk Lavra	Pechersk, Kyiv	1696	Originally a three-part three-dome church built at the expense of K. Mokiyevsky. In 1767, four one-dome sections were added.	
Church of the Saviour at Berestove	Pechersk, Kyiv	1647, end of 17th century	The medieval three-nave church was rebuilt by Petro Mohyla into a cruciform three-apse one in 1640–1647. By the end of 17th century, the church was decorated in the style of Ukrainian Baroque. The bell tower was built in 19th century.	
Church of Theodosius of the Caves of the Kyiv Pechersk Lavra	Pechersk, Kyiv	1698–1700	A large three-part three-dome church.	
Dormition Cathedral of the Kyiv Pechersk Lavra	Pechersk, Kyiv	1669–1677, 1722–1729, 1767–1769	The medieval church was significantly rebuilt: chapels and porches were added, six new side domes were built, and the exterior and interior were redecorated. It incorporates elements of the Elizabethan Baroque. The cathedral was almost entirely ruined in 1941, and rebuilt in the 1990s to match the style of the 18th century.	
Exaltation of the Holy Cross Church of Kyiv Pechersk Lavra	Pechersk, Kyiv	1697–1700	Three-part three-dome church. Built by the polkovnyk P. Hertsyk in place of a small stone chapel built by Petro Mohyla. Its iconostasis was made in 1769, and the murals are from the end of 19th century.	
Gate Church of the Trinity of the Kyiv Pechersk Lavra	Pechersk, Kyiv	1720s	The medieval church was rebuilt on the outside in the Baroque style. In 1730s, the interior was decorated and the iconostasis was made.	
Refectory Church of Intercession of Holy Virgin Mary of St. Nicholas Monastery	Pechersk, Kyiv	1690–1693	Built by Osip Startsev at the expense of Ivan Mazepa. One-dome church with one-story refectory room. The dome was destroyed in 19th century. The destruction of the church began in 1934, and finished in 1962.	
Refectory Church of Sts. Peter and Paul of Kyiv Pechersk Lavra	Pechersk, Kyiv	1684–1694	Two-story one-dome refectory church. In 1893–1895, a new refectory church was built in its place in the style of eclecticism.	
Resurrection Church of the Kyiv Pechersk Lavra	Pechersk, Kyiv	1696–1698	Small one-dome church built by the polkovnyk K. Mokiyevsky. The bell tower was built in 1860–1863.	
St. Nicholas Church of the Kyiv Pechersk Lavra	Pechersk, Kyiv	End of 17th century	Small one-dome church near the hospital building. Contains additions from 18th–19th centuries. It was seriously damaged during World War II.	
St. Nicholas Lesser Cathedral of St. Nicholas Monastery	Pechersk, Kyiv	1715	Built by Dmitry Golitsyn. Three-part one-dome church, with expansions and bell tower of 19th century. Destroyed in 1935.	
St. Nicholas Military Cathedral of St. Nicholas Monastery	Pechersk, Kyiv	1690–1696	Built by Osip Startsev at the expense of Ivan Mazepa. Large three-nave church with five low domes. Its three-story Elizabethan Baroque bell tower was built in 1750s. The cathedral and bell tower were destroyed in 1934, together with the seven-tiered iconostasis made in 1696.	
Annunciation Church	Podil, Kyiv	End of 17th to beginning of 18th centuries	Two-story one-dome refectory church. It was rebuilt in the Baroque style in 17th–18th centuries at the expense of Ivan Mazepa. It was damaged in the Soviet period and reconstructed inaccurately in the modern period.	
Ascension Cathedral of the Ascension Convent	Podil, Kyiv	1722–1732	A large three-dome, three-part, three-apse church. The classicist bell tower was built in 19th century.	
Boris and Gleb Church	Podil, Kyiv	1692	Built at the expense of H. Korovka-Volskyi. Three-part, one-dome church. Rebuilt throughout 18th–19th centuries. Destroyed in 1936.	
Church of Nicholas the Kind	Podil, Kyiv	1706–1716	The Baroque church was rebuilt in the classicist style before 1810. The new church was ruined in 1935. A small tent-roofed bell tower of 18th century is preserved to this day and currently belongs to the Ukrainian Greek Catholic Church.	
Church of Sts. Constantine and Helena	Podil, Kyiv	1734	Built at the expense of the burgomaster Hordiy Myntsevych. In 1747–175, Ivan Grigorovich-Barsky added a refectory and a bell tower. The church itself was significantly rebuilt in 1865. Most of the church was destroyed in the Soviet period.	
Church of Sts. Peter and Paul	Podil, Kyiv	1745–1750	Rebuilt from a late Gothic Dominican church of the 1600s. The two-story bell tower was designed by Ivan Grigorovich-Barsky. The church and its bell tower were destroyed in 1935.	
Epiphany Cathedral of the Brotherhood Monastery	Podil, Kyiv	1690–1693	A big three-nave and five-dome church. Built by the architect Osip Startsev at the expense of Ivan Mazepa. The three-story classicist bell tower of 18th–19th centuries. The cathedral and its bell tower were destroyed in 1935.	
Intercession Podil Church	Podil, Kyiv	1766–1772	Small three-part three-dome church with a small bell tower and a refectory. Designed by Ivan Grigorovich-Barsky.	
Naberezhna Church of St. Nicholas the Wondermaker	Podil, Kyiv	1772–1775	Designed by Ivan Grigorovich-Barsky.	
Prytyska Church of St. Nicholas the Wondermaker	Podil, Kyiv	1695–1707	Rebuilt from a cruciform church that was originally built in the 1640s into a nine-part one-dome church. The bell tower was built in 19th century.	
Resurrection Church	Podil, Kyiv	1670 or 1698	Built by M. Hrek in 1670, or by M. Rudzynskyi in 1698. Cruciform, five-part, five-dome church. In 18th–19th centuries it was rebuilt, resulting in the destruction of exterior domes and the decoration of the façade in the Elizabethan Baroque style. The bell tower was built in the beginning of 19th century. The church was destroyed in the Soviet period.	
St. Catherine's Church of the Greek Monastery	Podil, Kyiv	1738–1741	Ruined in the Soviet period. The 19th-century classicist bell tower was rebuilt in 1995.	
St. Elijah Church	Podil, Kyiv	1692	Three-part one-dome church. Built at the expense of P. Hudyma. The façade was significantly distorted in the end of 19th century. The bell tower of the church was built in the end of 18th century.	
Refectory Church of Transfiguration of Vydubychi Monastery	Vydubychi, Kyiv	1696–1701	One-dome refectory church. Built by polkovnyk М. Myklashevsky.	
St. George's Cathedral of Vydubychi Monastery	Vydubychi, Kyiv	1696–1701	Nine-part five-dome church, built at the expense of М. Myklashevsky. The five-tiered iconostasis of 1701 was destroyed in 1930s. The gate bell tower of the cathedral was built in 1727–1733 and rebuilt in 19th century.	
St. Michael's Cathedral of Vydubychi Monastery	Vydubychi, Kyiv	1766–1769	The medieval church was restored after a landslide in the Baroque style by M. Yurasov.	

=== Kyiv Oblast ===
Name	Location	Construction or reconstruction date	Notes	Photo
Dormition Church	Baryshivka	Early 18th century	Three-part one-dome church with later additions. A separate tent-roofed bell tower was located nearby. The church and the bell tower were destroyed in the 1930s.	
St. Nicholas Church	Bila Tserkva	1706–1711	Originally a large three-throne church. A part of the church was destroyed.	
Transfiguration Church of the Transfiguration Monastery	Neshcheriv	1794	One-dome rectangular church.	
Sts. Peter and Paul Church of Mezhyhirya Monastery	Novi Petrivtsi	1772–1774	Two-story one-dome refectory church with a three-story bell tower on its western side. Built by Ivan Grigorovich-Barsky and Petro Kalnyshevsky. Combined features of Ukrainian and Elizabethan baroque styles. Ruined in 1936.	
Transfiguration Cathedral of Mezhyhirya Monastery	Novi Petrivtsi	1676–1690	Built by Patriarch Joachim. Originally a large six-column five-dome church. In 1810s it was rebuilt in the classicist style. Ruined in 1936.	
Ascension Cathedral of the Ascension Monastery	Pereiaslav	1704–1709	Large cruciform nine-part one-dome church. Built at the expense of Ivan Mazepa. The three-story bell tower was built in the second half of the 18th century.	
Intercession Church	Pereiaslav	1695–1700	Seven-part three-dome church. Built at the expense of Ivan Myrovych. Destroyed in the Soviet period.	
St. Michael's Church	Pereiaslav	1743–1750	Built on the place of a previous wooden church. The monastery complex was damaged during World War II. Murals from 18th–19th centuries have been preserved on the inside. The bell tower was built in 1747.	
Intercession Church	Sulymivka	1622–1629	Possibly the oldest church of the traditional Ukrainian Baroque composition. Three-part one-dome church with a bell tower that was built later. Built by Ivan Sulyma.	
Sts. Anthony and Theodosius Cathedral	Vasylkiv	1755–1758	Large five-nave five-dome church with elements of Elizabethan Baroque. Built by Stepan Kovnir.	

=== Poltava Oblast ===
Name	Location	Construction or reconstruction date	Notes	Photo
Dormition Church	Liutenka	1686	Cruciform nine-part five-dome church built at the expense of Mykhailo Borokhovych. The five-tier iconostasis was lost in the 1930s. The church itself collapsed in 1973, and its ruins were disassembled.	
Transfiguration Cathedral of Mhar Monastery	Mhar	Before 1692	Built at the expense of Ivan Samoylovych and Ivan Mazepa. Large three-nave church, originally with seven domes, and since the 18th century — with five. Its bell tower was built in 1785. The iconostasis that was made in 1762–1765 was destroyed in the Soviet period.	
Ascension Church of Pushkarivka Monastery	Poltava	1762	Towerless tetraconch church. Neglected in the Soviet period and reconstructed in the 2000s.	
Dormition Cathedral	Poltava	1749–1770	Three-nave five-dome church with additions from the 19th century. The classicist bell tower was built in 1776–1801. The cathedral was destroyed in 1938. The cathedral was rebuilt in the 1990s with significant violations of design documentation.	
Holy Cross Exaltation Cathedral of the Holy Cross Exaltation Monastery	Poltava	1689–1709	Large three-nave seven-dome church built by the Kochubey family. The bell tower was built in 1786. Decorations and the four-tier iconostasis form 1772 were destroyed in the Soviet period.	
Trinity Church of the Holy Cross Exaltation Monastery	Poltava	1750	One-dome refectory church. Partially rebuilt.	
Cathedral of the Nativity of the Blessed Virgin Mary	Pyriatyn	1781	Small three-part church. Built by order of the regimental osavul A. M. Ilchenko.	
Transfiguration Church	Velyki Sorochyntsi	1728–1734	Cruciform nine-part five-dome church (before the 19th century — nine-dome). Built by Stepan Kovnir at the expense of Danylo Apostol. The five-tier iconostasis was made in the 1730s. Functions as the tomb of the hetman and his family.	

=== Sumy Oblast ===
Name	Location	Construction or reconstruction date	Notes	Photo
St. Michael's Church of Hlukhiv Peter and Paul Monastery	Budyshcha	1712	Three-part three-dome gate church. The dome above the narthex was disassembled in the end of 18th century, and a bell tower was built in its place. The church was slowly taken apart for materials after World War II until almost nothing remained.	
Sts. Peter and Paul Church of Hlukhiv Peter and Paul Monastery	Budyshcha	1695–1697	Three-part three-dome church with Naryshkin Baroque decor. Built by M. Yefimov on the order of Demetrius of Rostov. Destroyed in the 1930s.	
Trinity Cathedral of Okhtyrka Trinity Monastery	Chernechchyna	1724–1727	Three-part three-dome church with Naryshkin Baroque influence. Built at the expense of T. Nadarzhynsky. Partially rebuilt in 1842, and the bell tower was constructed in 18th–19th centuries. Heavily damaged during World War II and consequently taken apart for materials (except for the bell tower).	
Cathedral of the Nativity of Virgin Mary of Hamaliivka St. Charalambos Monastery	Hamaliivka	1710s–1735	Cruciform nine-part five-dome church. Built at the expense of Ivan Skoropadsky. The bell tower built in 18th–19th centuries was destroyed in the 1960s.	
St. Charalambos Church of Hamaliivka St. Charalambos Monastery	Hamaliivka	1714	Small refectory church. Distorted in the Soviet period and not restored. The church used to house the tomb of the Skoropadsky family.	
Church of the Nativity of Blessed Virgin Mary at Veryhine	Hlukhiv	Second half of 18th century	Three-part three-dome church. Its three-story bell tower was built in 1803. The church and the bell tower were destroyed in the 1930s.	
St. Anastasia Church	Hlukhiv	1717	Small church with no domes. Built at the expense of Ivan Skoropadsky. Destroyed in 1896.	
St. Michael's Church	Hlukhiv	1695	Built by M. Yefimov. Destroyed by a fire in 1784.	
St. Nicholas Church	Hlukhiv	1693–1695	Two-part two-dome church with Naryshkin Baroque influence. Built by V. Yalotsky. The narthex and bell tower were built in 19th century. The 18th-century five-tier iconostasis was destroyed in the Soviet period.	
Three Holy Hierarchs Church	Hlukhiv	1767–1780	Cruciform three-part one-dome church. Destroyed in the 1930s.	
Trinity Cathedral	Hlukhiv	1720–1805	Large cruciform three-dome church with elements of late Baroque and Classicism. Built by Ivan Skoropadsky, with additions by Andrey Kvasov and others. The classicist bell tower was destroyed in 1929, while the cathedral was destroyed in 1962.	
Cathedral of the Nativity of Virgin Mary	Konotop	1732–1739	Three-part one-dome church. Built at the expense of H. Nizhynsky and I. Vakulenko. Rebuilt in Neo-Byzantine style in 1886. Destroyed in the 1930s.	
Cathedral of the Nativity of Virgin Mary	Krolevets	1742–1749	Three-part three-dome church. Built at the expense of sotnyk H. Ohiievsky and priest Y. Makovsky. The bell tower was built in 1829–1830, and later additions date to the 19th century. Destroyed in the Soviet period.	
Dormition Cathedral	Lebedyn	1770–1797	Two-story church with classicist elements. The lower church is four-columned, and the upper part is three-part and three-dome. The classicist bell tower was built in the 19th century. The cathedral and the bell tower were destroyed in 1939.	
Dormition Church	Mezhyrich	1759–1772	Cruciform one-dome church with a narthex. The building was somewhat damaged and the iconostasis from the 1770s was destroyed in the Soviet period.	
Dormition Cathedral	Okhtyrka	1728–1738	Four-column church with one dome. The bell tower is from the 19th century. Destroyed in the Soviet period.	
Intercession Cathedral	Okhtyrka	1753–1762	Large three-part three-dome church. Combines elements of Ukrainian and Elizabethan Baroque. Designed by D. Ukhtomsky and S. Dudynsky. The bell tower was buit in the 1770s.	
St. Nicholas Cossack Church	Putyvl	1735–1737	Two-story three-part church. The bell tower was built in 1770.	
Holy Spirit Cathedral	Romny	1742–1746	Three-part three-dome church.	
St. Nicholas Church	Stare Selo	1750s	Three-part one-dome church with a two-story bell tower. Destroyed in the 1930s.	
Intercession Church	Sumy	1783–1790	Seven-part three-dome church with Baroque and Classicist elements. The classicist bell tower was consecrated in 1821. The church and the bell tower were destroyed in the Soviet period.	
Resurrection Cathedral	Sumy	1702	Two-story three-part three-dome church with Naryshkin Baroque decor. The original tent-roofed bell tower has not been preserved. The current bell tower was built in 20th century and imitated the cathedral's style.	
St. Michael's Church	Voronizh	1776–1781	Cruciform one-dome church with a three-story bell tower.	
Transfiguration Church	Vorozhba	1752–1770	Three-part three-dome church that combines Ukrainian and Elizabethan Baroque styles.	

=== Volyn Oblast ===
Name	Location	Construction or reconstruction date	Notes	Photo
Dormition Church of the Dormition Monastery	Nyzkynychi	1643–1653	Five-part five-domed church built by Adam Kisiel. The building belongs to Volhynian architectural school and is transitional between Renaissance and Baroque architecture. It is considered to be a prototype of later Baroque churches in Dnieper Ukraine.	

== Russia ==
Name	Location	Construction or reconstruction date	Notes	Photo
Church of St. Basil the Great	Belozersk, Vologda Oblast	Second quarter of 18th century	Original-style church without columns. Served as the winter church next to the city's Transfiguration Cathedral. Demolished in the Soviet period.	
Dormition Cathedral	Dubovka, Volgograd Oblast	Before 1796	Large nine-part nine-dome church with a classicist bell tower. Destroyed in the Soviet period.	
St. Nicholas Cathedral of Katashin Monastery	Katashin, Bryansk Oblast	Before 1699	Four-column five-dome three-apse church. Built at the expense of Mykhailo Myklashevsky modeled after Mazepa's churches in Kyiv. Almost completely destroyed in 1960.	
Church of Virgin Mary of the Sign	Kurovo, Moscow Oblast	1681–1687	Three-part three-dome church built by the boyar Aleksei Shein. The bell tower and the iconostasis were built in the 18th century. The church was destroyed in 1936.	
Church of Virgin Mary of Kazan in Uzkoye	Moscow	1697–1698	Cruciform five-dome church with Naryshkin Baroque decor. Built by the boyar T. Streshnyov. The 17th-century iconostasis was destroyed in the Soviet period.	
Church of the Nativity of the Blessed Virgin Mary	Ponurovka, Bryansk Oblast	1778	Nine-part one-dome church with elements of Classicism. Built at the expense of Y. Myklashevska.	
Resurrection Military Cathedral	Starocherkasskaya, Rostov Oblast	1706–1719	Large nine-part nine-dome church. The two-story parvise and tent-roofed bell tower were built in 1725–1730. The iconostasis was made in 1749.	
Cathedral of the Nativity of Christ	Starodub, Bryansk Oblast	1677–1678; 1744	Three-part three-dome church. The interior decor has not been preserved.	
Epiphany Church	Starodub, Bryansk Oblast	1770–1789	Cubic one-dome one-apse church with 19th-century extensions.	
Transfiguration Church	Starodub, Bryansk Oblast	End of 17th century	Three-part seven-dome church. Destroyed in the Soviet period.	
Epiphany Church	Tobolsk, Tyumen Oblast	Before 1744	Three-part two-dome church with a tent-roofed bell tower. Combines features of Ukrainian and Naryshkin Baroque. Destroyed (likely in the 1930s).	
Intercession Cathedral	Tobolsk, Tyumen Oblast	Mid 18th century	Cruciform one-dome refectory church. The Classicist bell tower was built in the 1790s.	
Church of Forty Martyrs of Sebaste of the Trinity Monastery	Tyumen, Tyumen Oblast	1710s	Small two-dome refectory church. Entirely destroyed in the 1940s. Siberian Baroque style with strong influence of Ukrainian Baroque.	
Sts. Peter and Paul Church of the Trinity Monastery	Tyumen, Tyumen Oblast	1726–1755	Cruciform five-dome church with later additions (including a tent-roofed bell tower). Siberian Baroque style with strong influence of Ukrainian Baroque.	
Trinity Cathedral of the Trinity Monastery	Tyumen, Tyumen Oblast	1708–1715	Three-part four-column five-dome church with later additions. Siberian Baroque style with strong influence of Ukrainian Baroque.	
Annunciation Cathedral of the Mitrophan Monastery	Voronezh, Voronezh Oblast	1718–1733	Large five-part five-dome church. Distorted after it was rebuilt in the 19th century. Heavily damaged during World War II and subsequently disassembled in the 1950s.	
Dormition Cathedral of Kamenka Assumption Monastery	Zabrama, Bryansk Oblast	1776–1779	Seven-part one-dome church. Rebuilt in the 19th century. It is currently in a severely damaged state: the vaults and the upper part of the dome have collapsed, and a significant part of the exterior decoration has been destroyed. It has not been restored.	
Saint Nicholas Church of Lebyazhy Monastery	Bryukhovetsky District, Krasnodar Krai	1804–1816	Nine-dome stone church constructed following the model of Dormition Cathedral, Kyiv Pechersk Lavra. In 1921 transferred into a school, later destroyed.	
Church of All Saints, Lebyazhy Monastery	Bryukhovetsky District, Krasnodar Krai	1809	One-dome church with an attached belfry, modelled after wooden churches of Sloboda Ukrainian type historically widespread around Kuban. Destroyed under the Soviet regime.	
St. Nicholas Church, Temryuk	Temryuk, Krasnodar Krai	1803	One-dome church modelled after wooden churches of Sloboda Ukrainian type. Destroyed under the Soviet regime. Constructed by Black Sea Cossacks using remains of a Turkish fortress previously located in the area. Demolished under the Soviet rule.	

== Sources ==
- Вечерський, В. В. (2002). Втрачені об'єкти архітектурної спадщини України (in Ukrainian). Kyiv: НДІТІАМ. ISBN 966-7452-42-5.
- Раппопорт, П. А. (1982). А. Н. Кирпичников (ed.). Русская архитектура X—XIII вв.: каталог памятников (PDF) (in Russian). Leningrad: Наука.
