= Ukrainian Baroque =

Baroque style in Ukraine

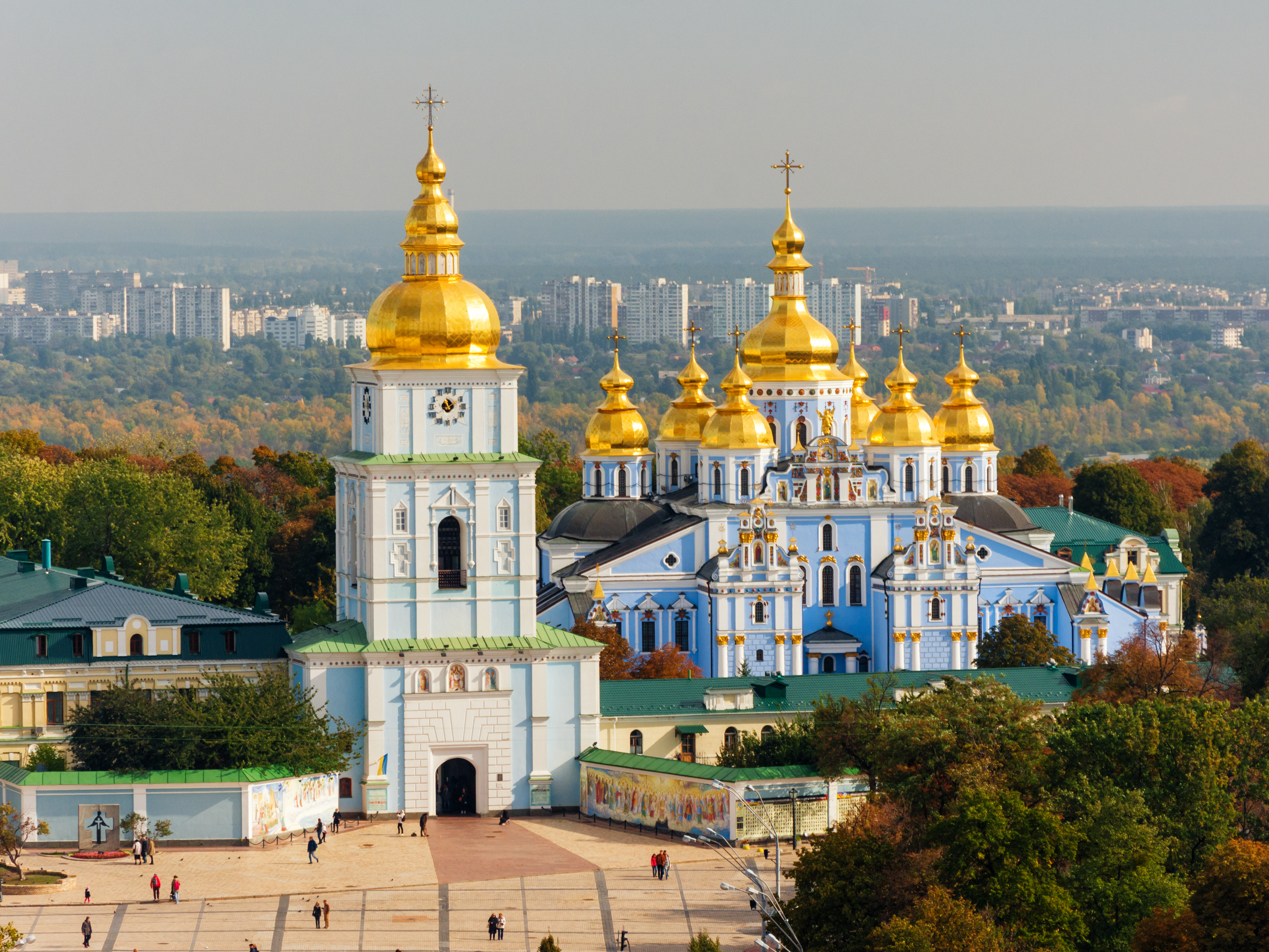
The St. Michael's Golden-Domed Monastery in Kyiv represents one of the most typical examples of Ukrainian Baroque architecture.

Ukrainian Baroque (Ukrainian: українське бароко), also known as Cossack Baroque (Ukrainian: козацьке бароко) or Mazepa Baroque, is an artistic style that was widespread in Ukraine in the 17th and 18th centuries. It was the result of a combination of local traditions and European Baroque.

According to scholar Dmytro Chyzhevsky, the Baroque period has had a decisive influence on the whole Ukrainian culture. Many defining national symbols and archetypes of Ukraine have their roots in Baroque art.

== History ==
Thanks to influences from Western Europe, from the late 16th century the lands of modern Ukraine came under the influence of the secularized Baroque form of art and architecture, which was still unknown in the neighbouring Tsardom of Russia. According to the historian Serhii Plokhy, Petro Mohyla, the Metropolitan of Kyiv from 1633 to 1647, was crucial in developing the style as part of his drive to reform the Ukrainian Orthodox Church and adapt the Church to the challenges of the Reformation and Counter-Reformation. Ukrainian Baroque reached its apogee in the time of the Cossack Hetman Ivan Mazepa, from 1687 to 1708. Mazepa Baroque is an original synthesis of Western European Baroque architectural forms and Ukrainian national Baroque architectural traditions.

== Architectural style ==
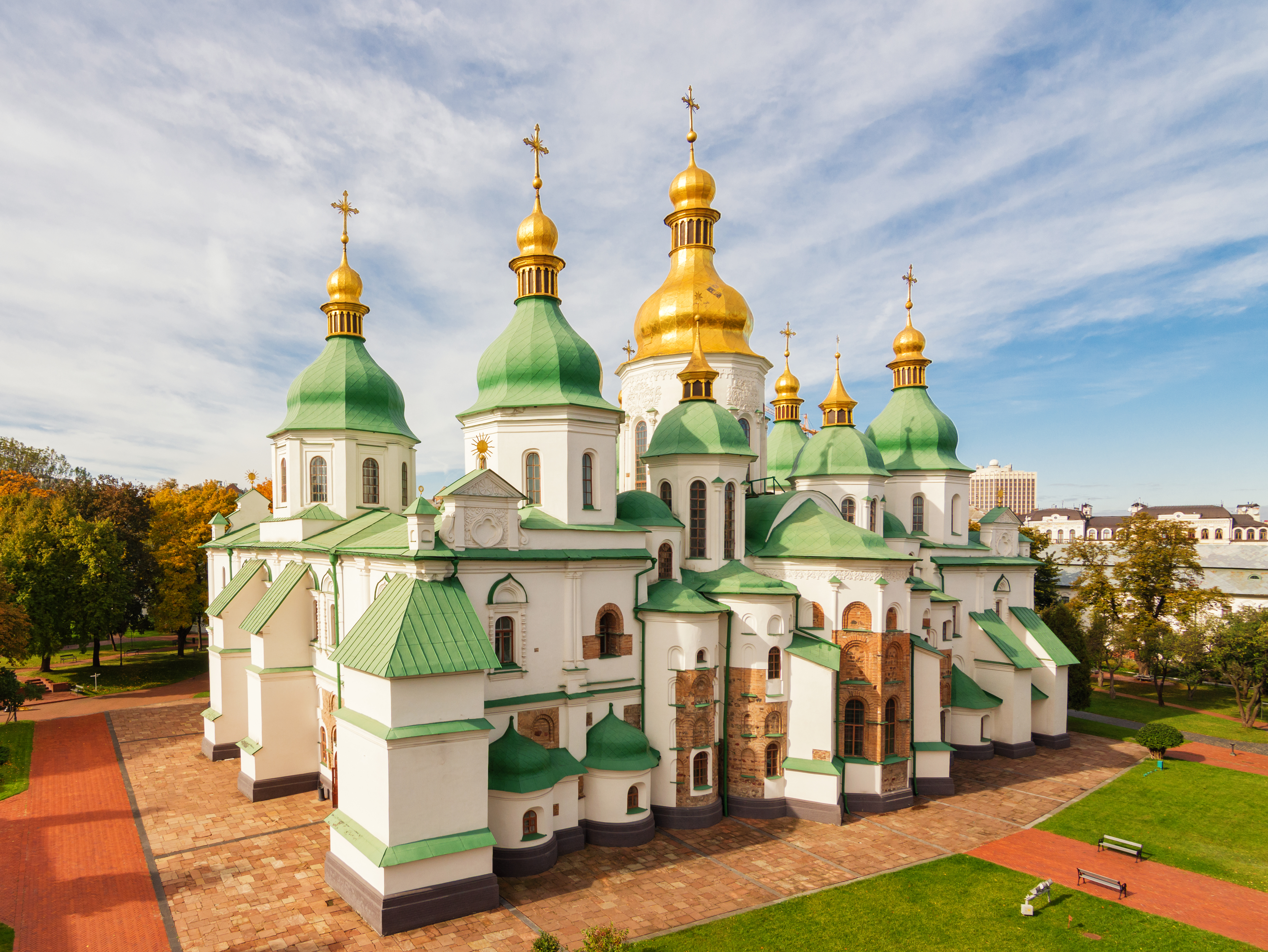
St. Sophia Cathedral, Kyiv

Ukrainian Baroque is distinct from the Western European Baroque in having more moderate ornamentation and simpler forms, and as such was considered more constructivist. Many Ukrainian Baroque buildings have been preserved, including several buildings in Kyiv Pechersk Lavra and the Vydubychi Monastery in Kyiv. The historian Andrew Wilson has identified All Saints' Church, the Cathedral of the Dormition and the Trinity Gate Church within the Kyiv Pechersk Lavra as good examples of the style, along with St. Michael's Golden-Domed Monastery in Kyiv and St. Catherine's in Chernihiv. The exterior of St. Sophia Cathedral in Kyiv also underwent significant alterations in the Baroque style. Another example of the style is the Church of St. Elijah in Subotiv, where Bohdan Khmelnytsky buried his son Tymish in 1653 after his death in battle.

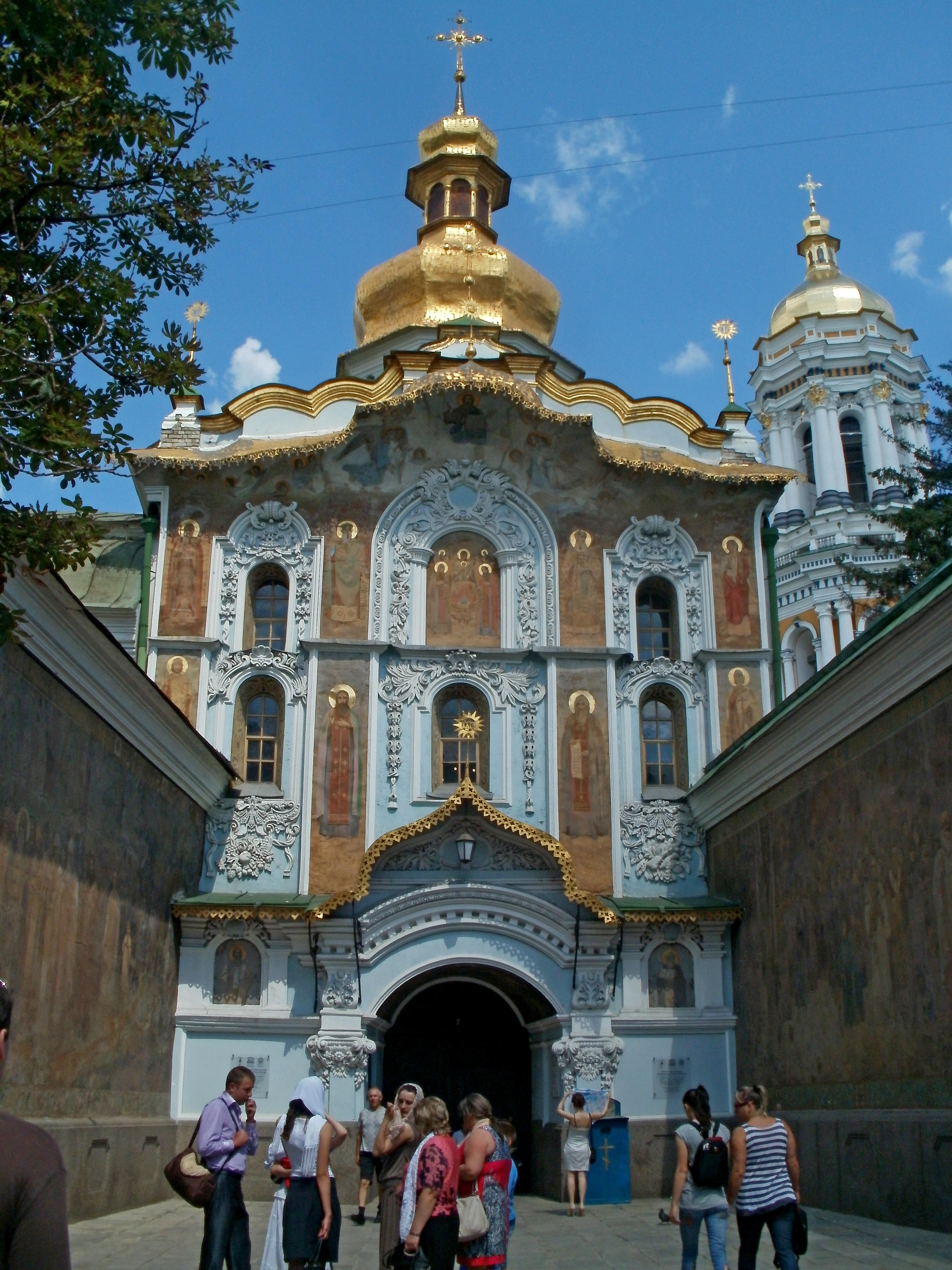
Holy Trinity Church

=== Notable architects ===
Baroque sculptor Johann Georg Pinsel, who was active during the mid-18th century in Galicia, was the subject of a special exhibition at the Louvre in Paris in 2012–2013. Pinsel, which demonstrated a unique, masterful expressiveness of form and a highly personal characterization of drapery is now recognized as a leading figure in European Baroque sculpture. Italian Baroque architect Bartolomeo Rastrelli, who is best known for designing the Winter Palace in Saint Petersburg and Catherine Palace in Tsarskoe Selo, also made contributions to the Ukrainian Baroque style, designing St. Andrew's Church and Mariinskyi Palace in Kyiv. The palace is now used as the official residence of the President of Ukraine. Galician architect Bernard Meretyn designed the ornate St. George's Cathedral, Lviv, used as a mother church by the Ukrainian Greek Catholic Church.

Other notable Baroque architects active in Ukraine include:

- Andreas Schlüter (c.1662–1714) – German architect and sculptor who worked in Zhovkva.
- Ivan Zarudny (1670–1727) – architect and icon artist from Sloboda Ukraine active in Moscow.
- Johann Gottfried Schädel (1680–1752) – German architect active in Ukraine and Russia.
- Osip Startsev (fl.1676–1714) – Russian architect active in Kyiv.
- Stepan Kovnir (1695–1786) – Ukrainian architect known for his work on Kyiv Pechersk Lavra.
- Ivan Grigorovich-Barsky (1713–1791) – Ukrainian architect from Kyiv.
- Andrey Kvasov (c.1720–c.1770) – Russian architect who worked in Ukrainian cities of Kozelets, Baturyn and Hlukhiv.
- Gottfried Hoffman (fl.1770–1775) – Silesian architect who worked in Lviv, Buchach and Pochaiv.

=== Influence ===
Certain features of Ukrainian Baroque architecture influenced the Naryshkin Baroque movement in the 17th–18th century in Moscow. Modern Ukrainian church buildings, such as Troieshchyna Cathedral, are also built in this style, but it is not typical for Ukrainian Baroque. Elements of the Ukrainian Baroque style were later adapted by the Ukrainian-Canadian community when building their own churches, adapted for the wooden church architecture more typical in Canadian-Ukrainian churches.

=== Gallery ===
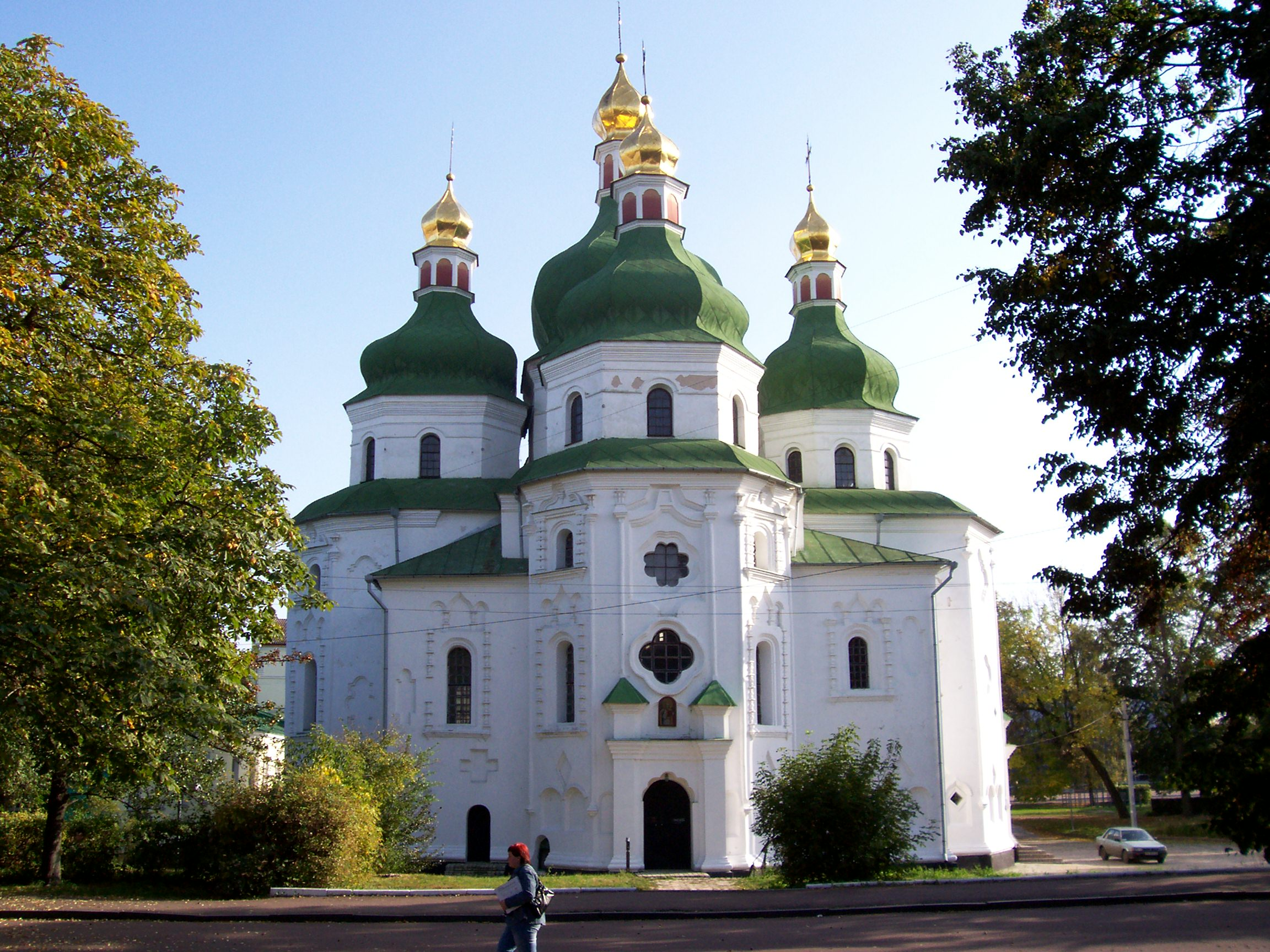
St. Nicholas Cathedral, Nizhyn - one of the first Baroque architectural monuments in Ukraine (1653)

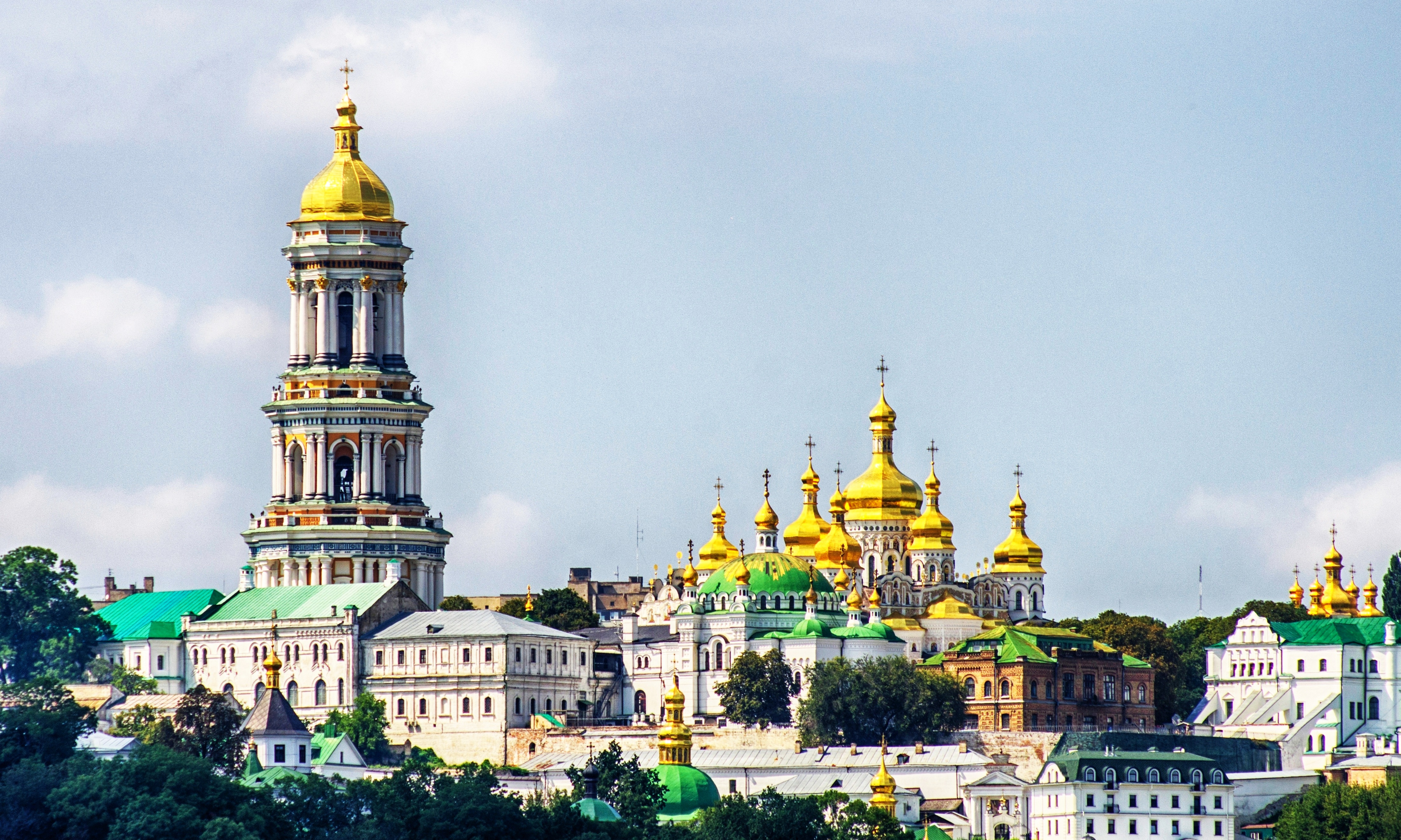
Kyiv Pechersk Lavra (Baroque parts built in 16th–18th centuries)

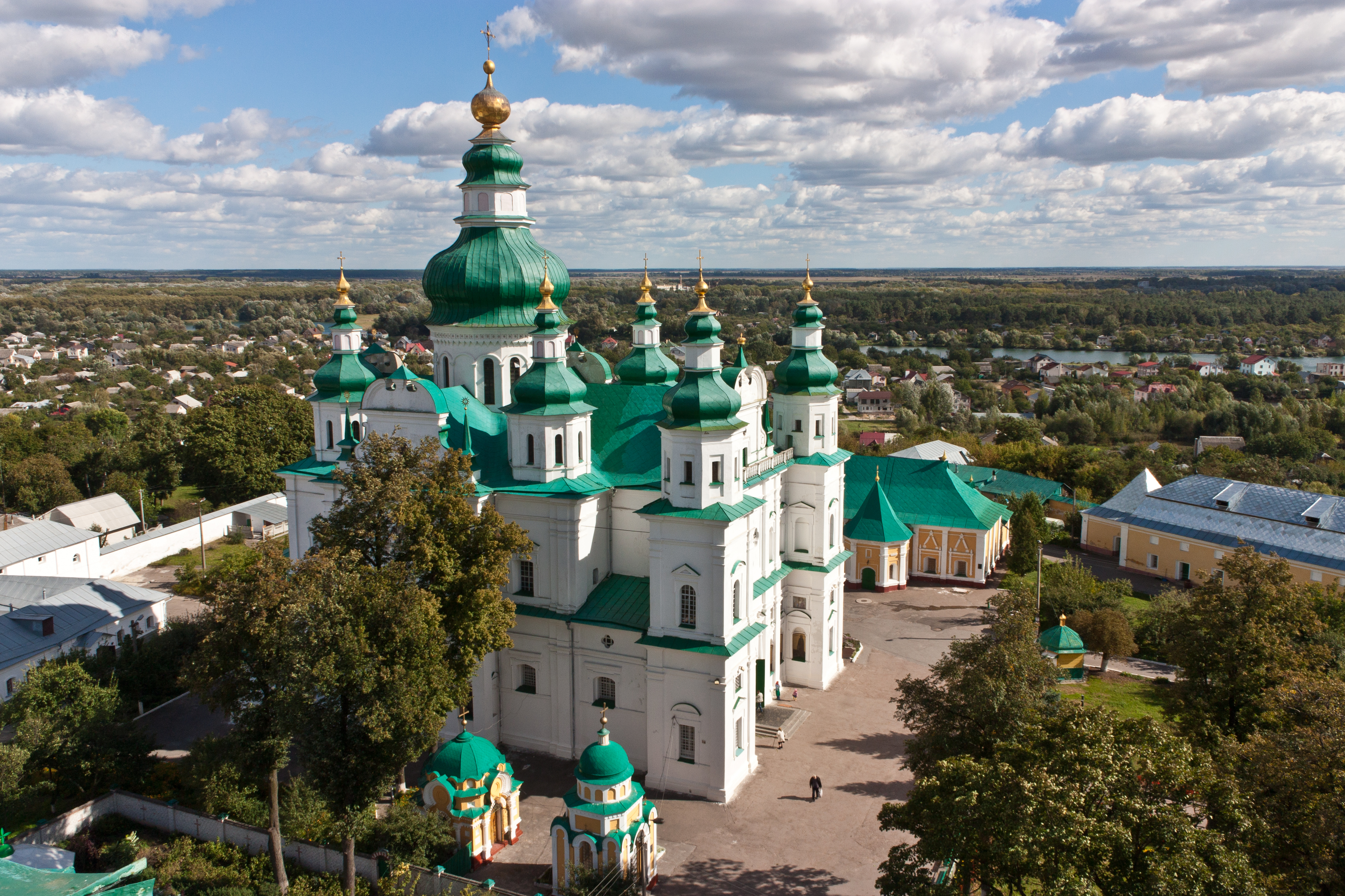
Trinity Monastery, Chernihiv (1680s)

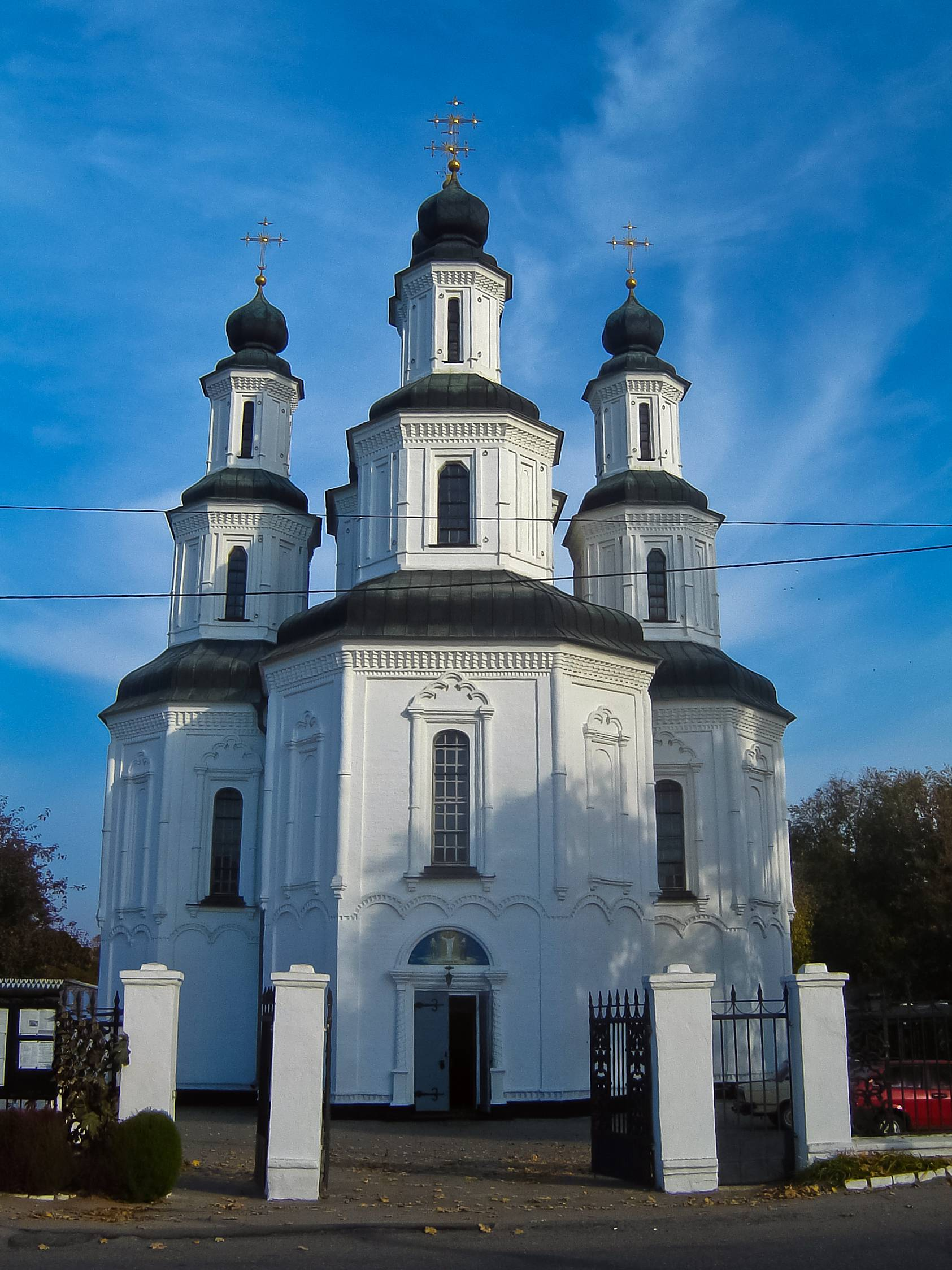
Holy Transfiguration Cathedral, Izium (1682)

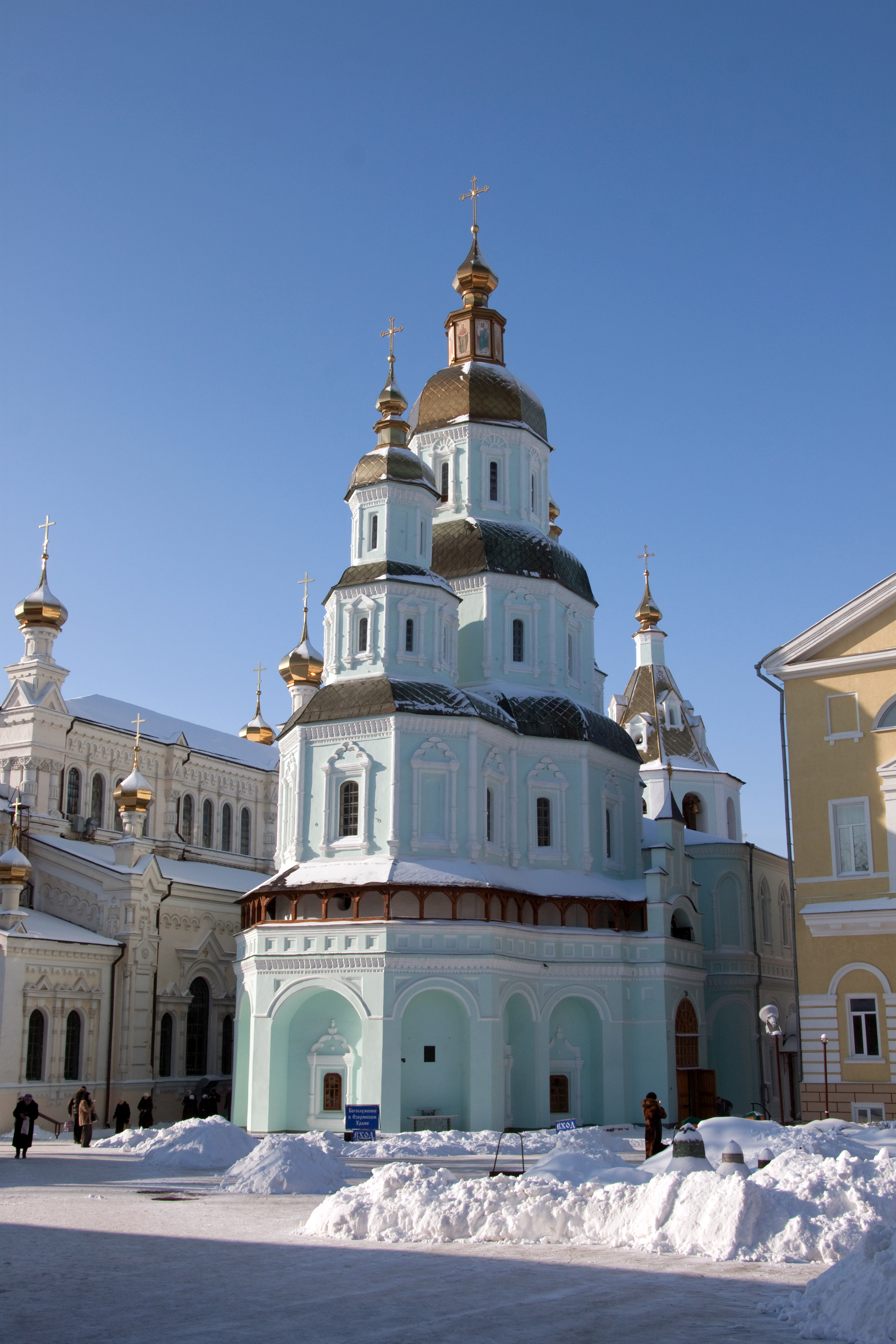
Intercession Cathedral of Intercession Monastery, Kharkiv (1689)

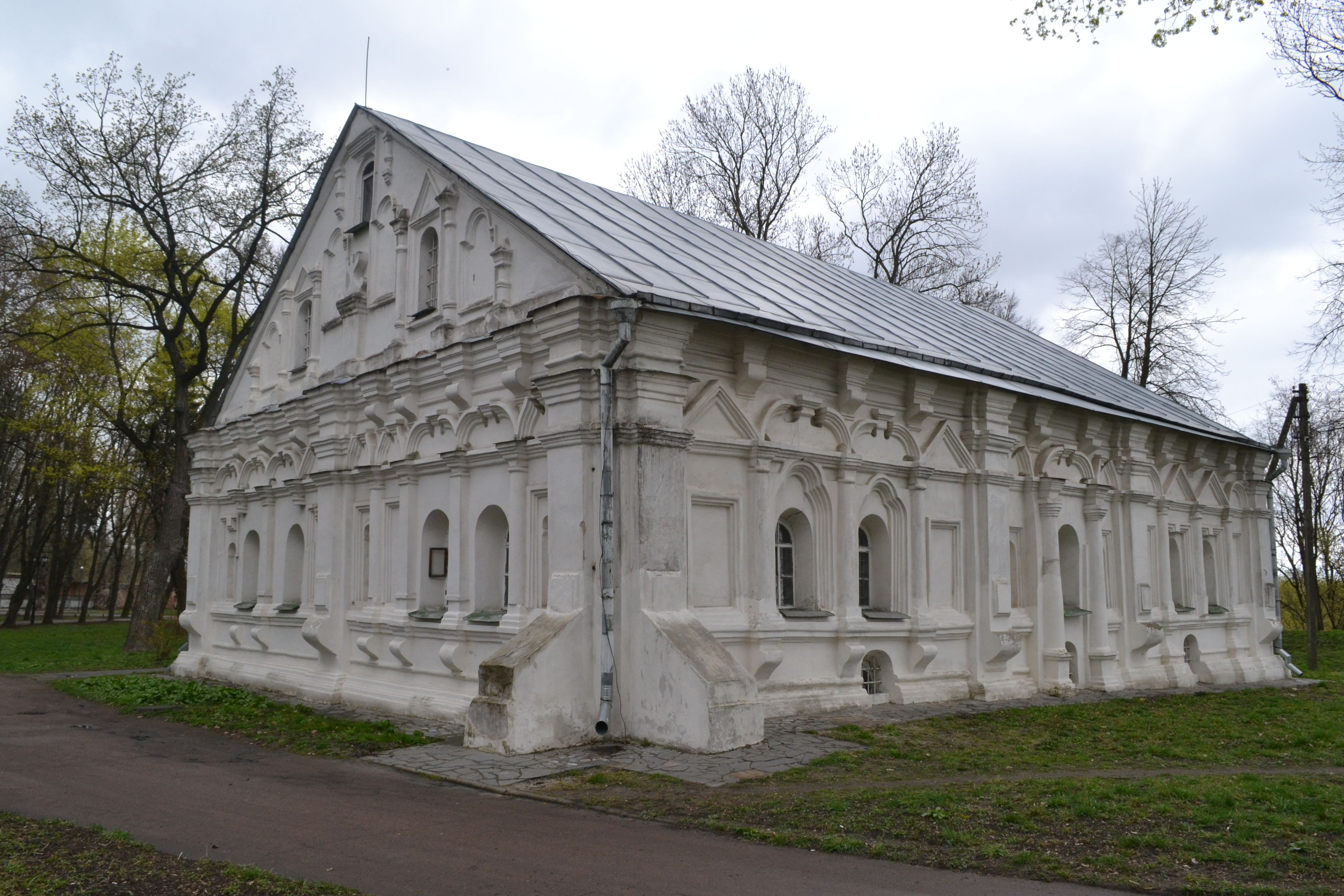
Building of Chernihiv Regimental Chancellery, 1690s

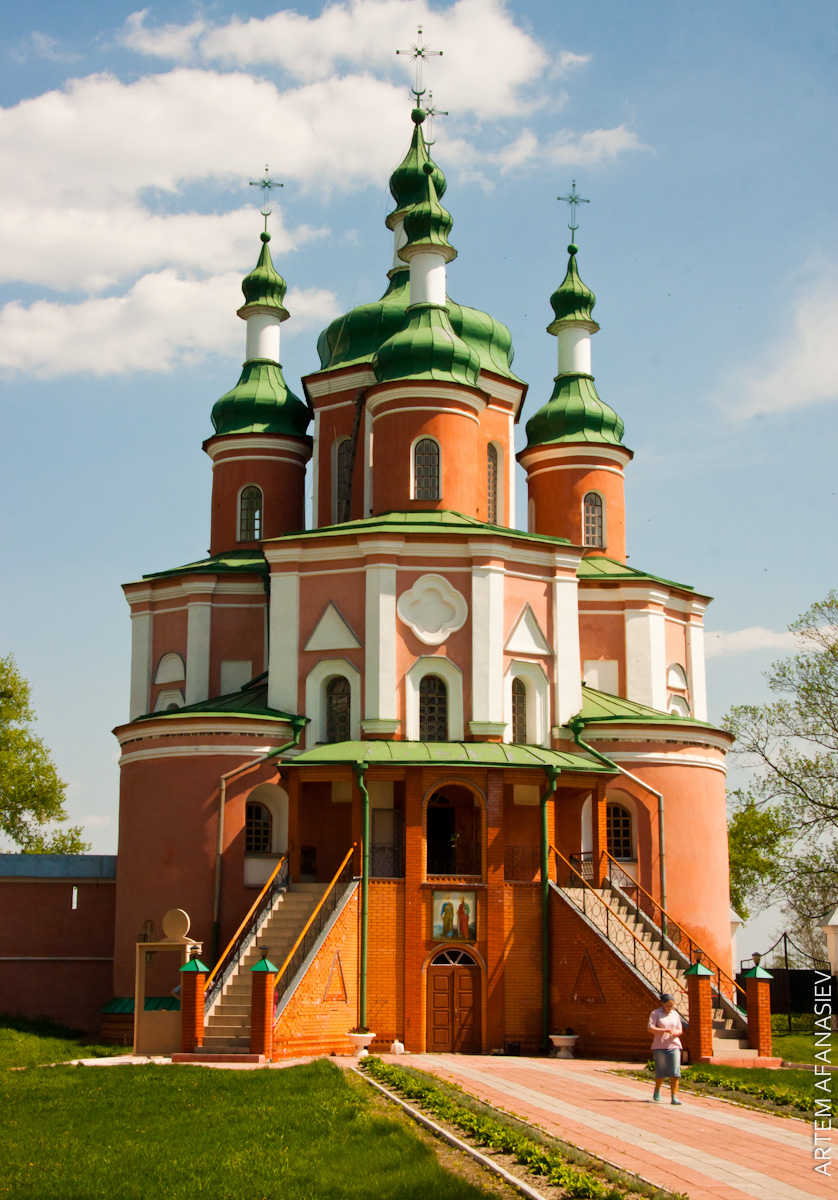
Peter and Paul Church of the Hustynia Monastery, Chernihiv Oblast (1693)

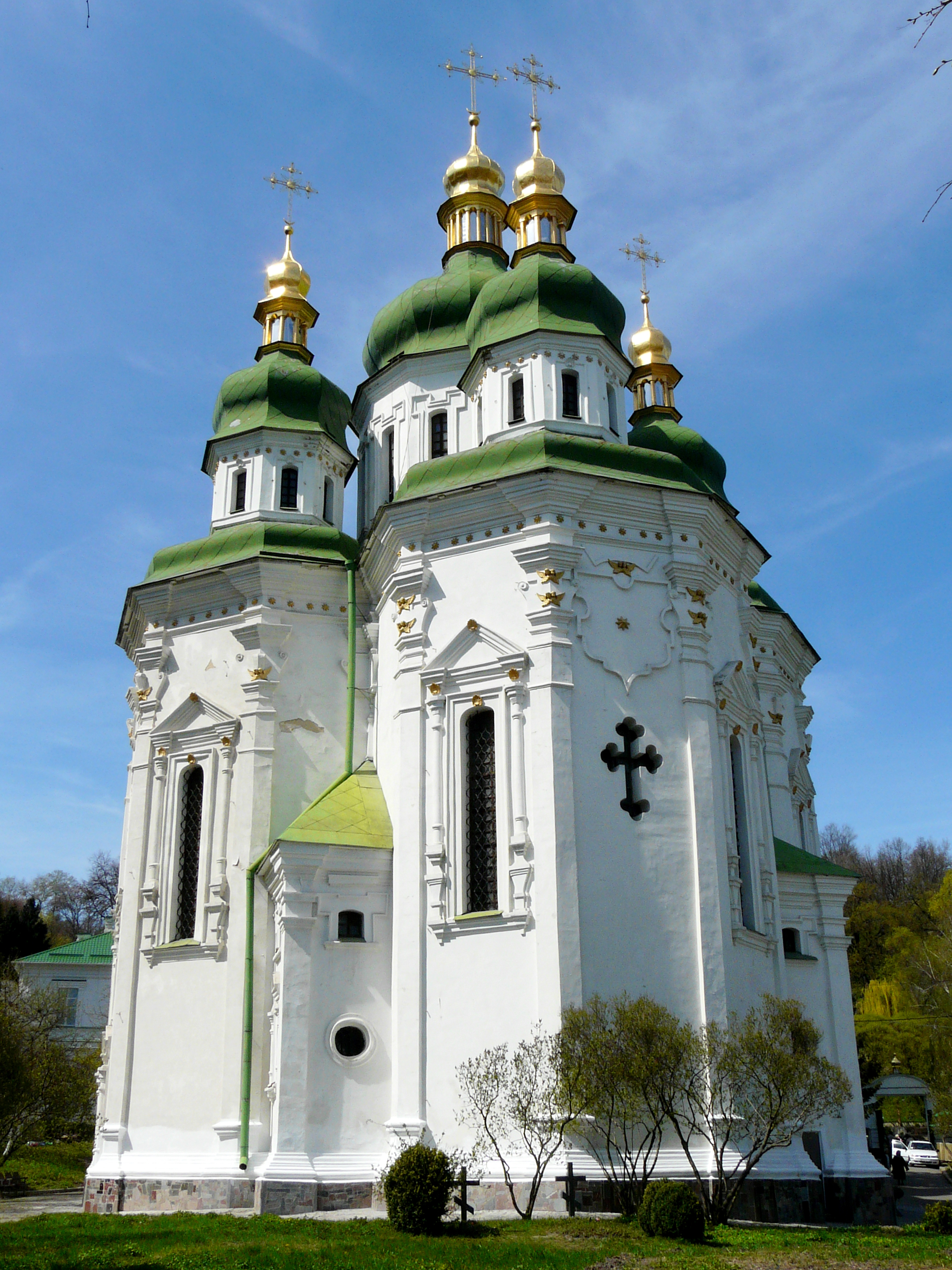
St. George's Cathedral of Vydubychi Monastery, Kyiv (1696)

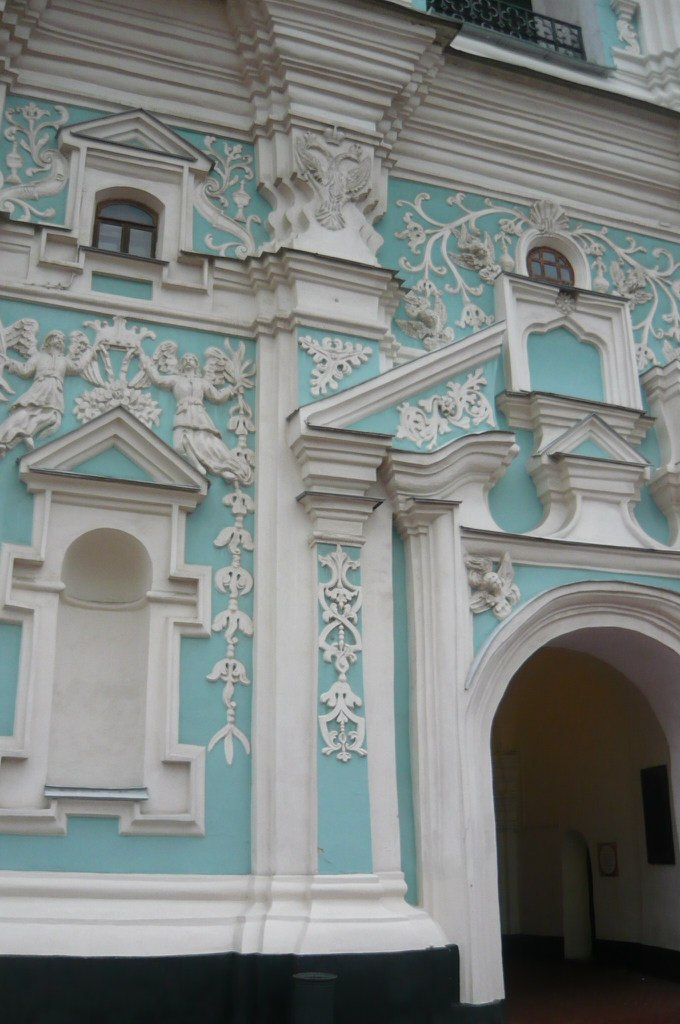
Fragment of the decor of the bell tower (1706) of the Saint Sophia Cathedral

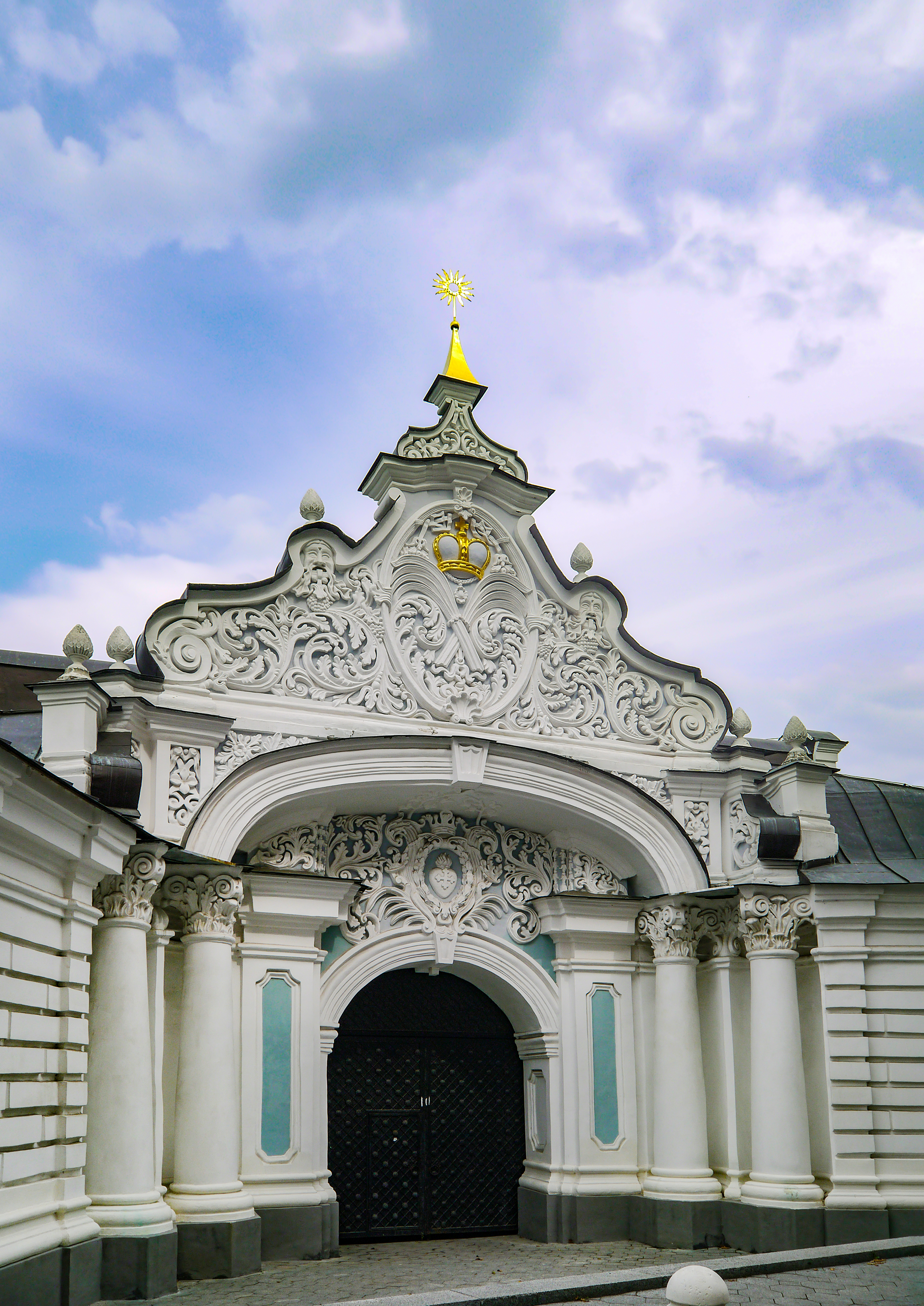
Zaborovsky gate of Saint Sophia Cathedral, Kyiv (1746)

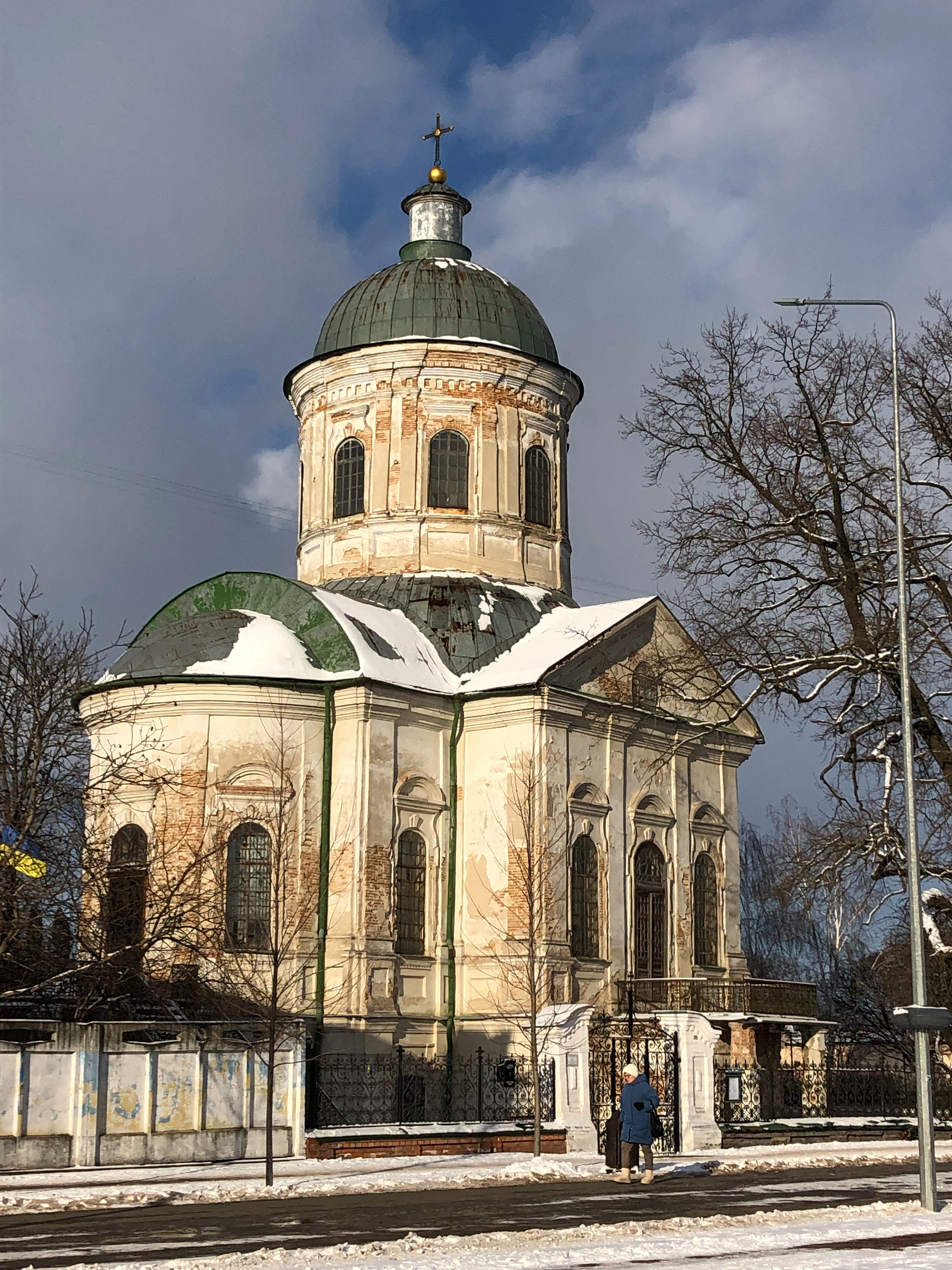
Church of Ivan the Theologian, Nizhyn (1757), architect Ivan Hryhorovych-Barsky. There is a noticeable transition from Baroque to Classicism

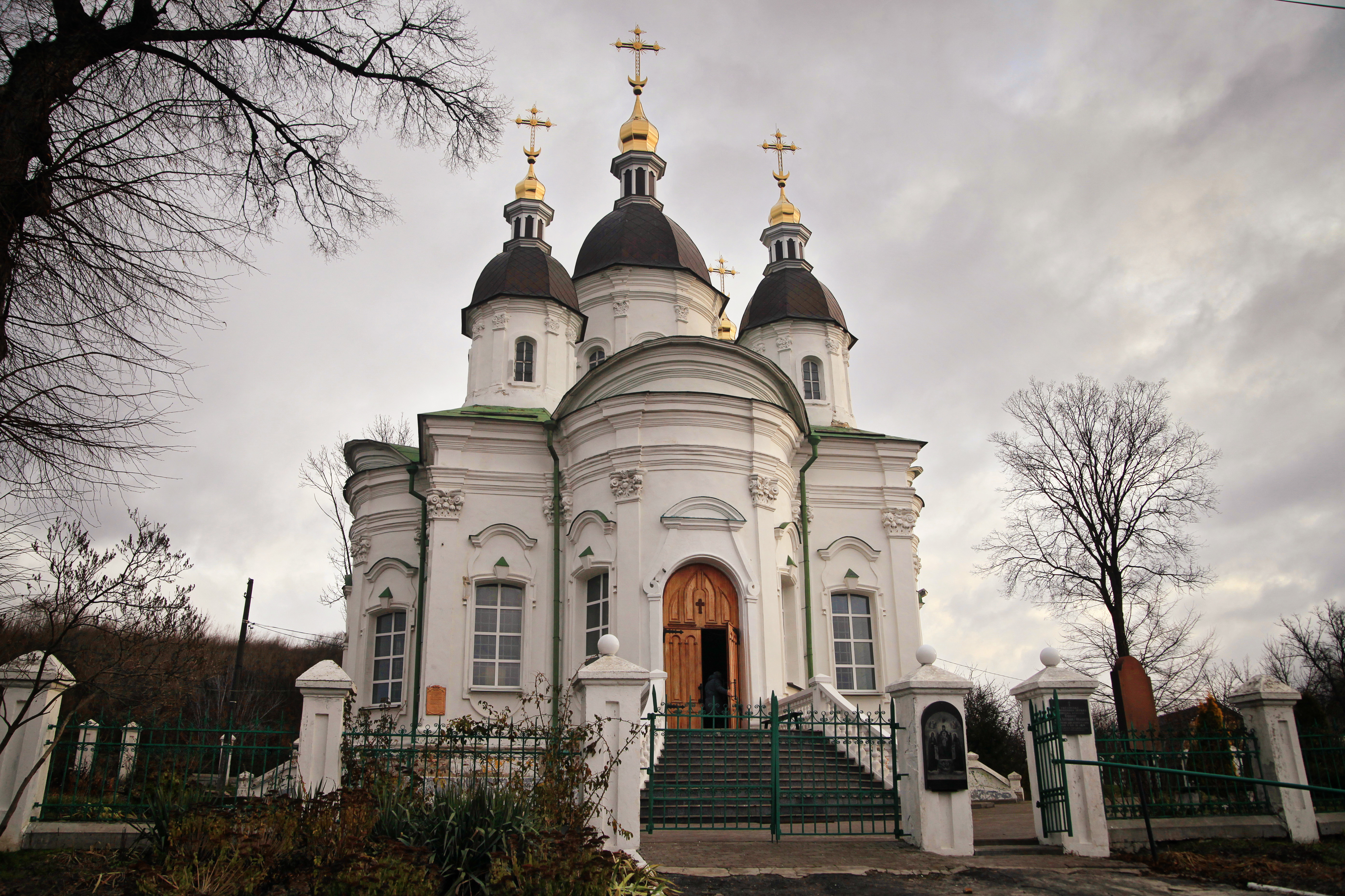
Vasylkiv Cathedral of Sts. Anthony and Theodosius of Pechersk (1758), designed by Stepan Kovnir

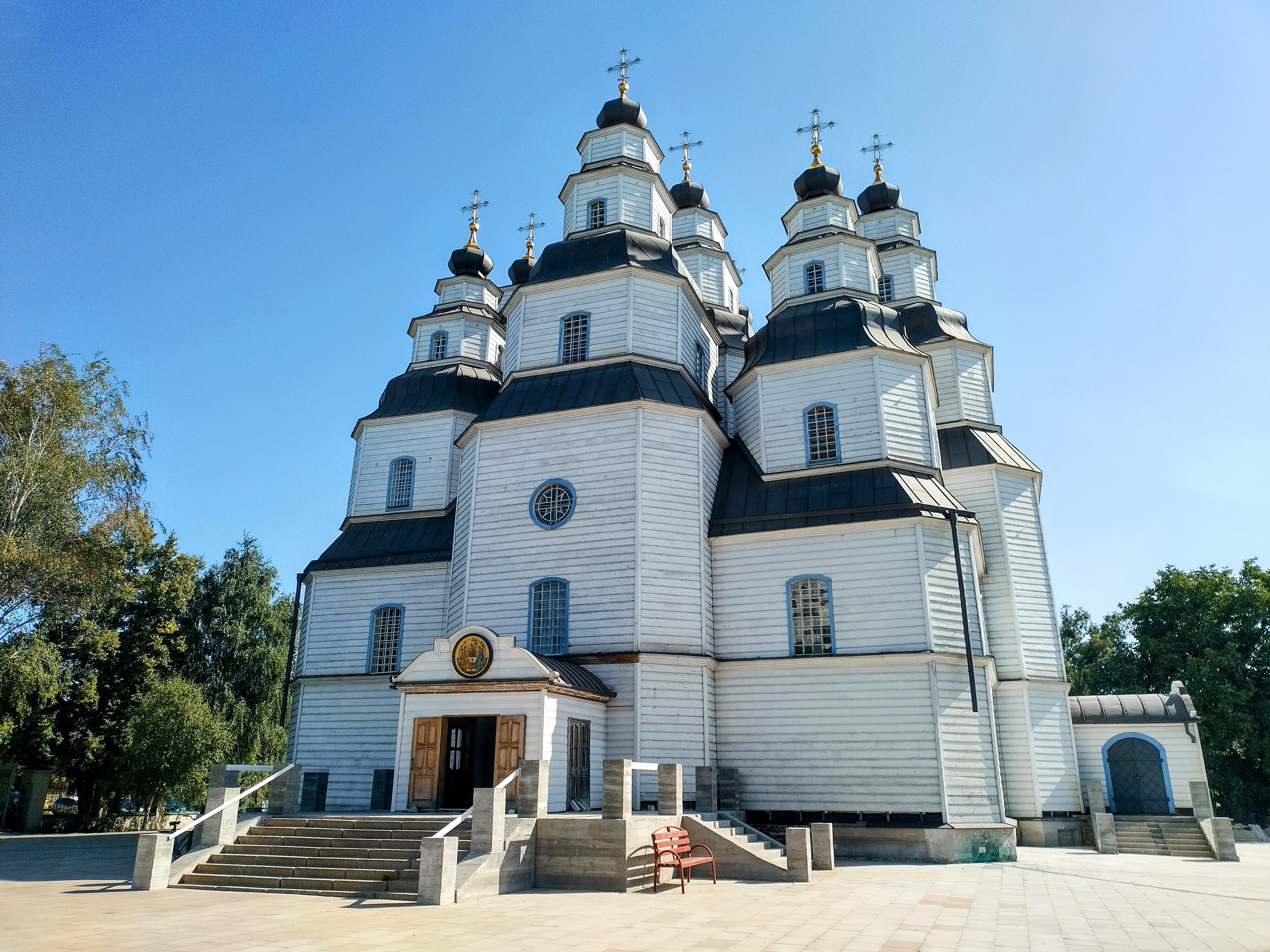
Trinity Cathedral, Samar (1781). One of the few examples of a fully wooden Ukrainian Baroque church.

== Ukrainian Baroque art ==
Baroque style in Ukrainian art dominated from around 1600 until the late 18th century. Starting from the 16th century Ukrainian religious artists abandoned most elements of Byzantine art and adopted a clearer, more laconic style influenced by folk art motives and characterized by joyous features. Ukrainian icons created during that period are characterized with saturated colours and rich decorative elements. Baroque art from Ukraine influenced iconographers in the broader region and was mentioned in accounts by contemporaries, such as Paul of Aleppo. The best examples of Baroque painting in Ukraine are the church paintings in the Holy Trinity Church of the Kyiv Pechersk Lavra. Rapid development in engraving techniques occurred during the Ukrainian Baroque period. Advances utilized a complex system of symbolism, allegories, heraldic signs, and sumptuous ornamentation.

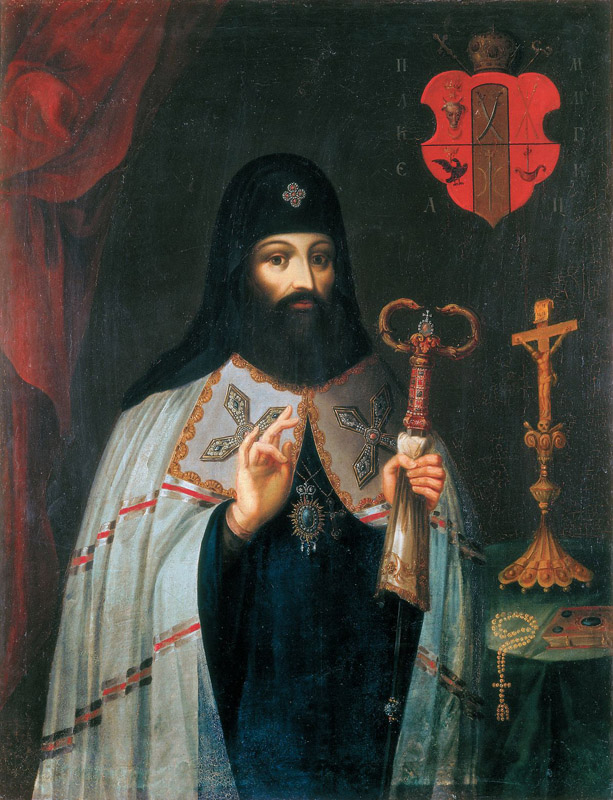
17th-century portrait of metropolitan Petro Mohyla

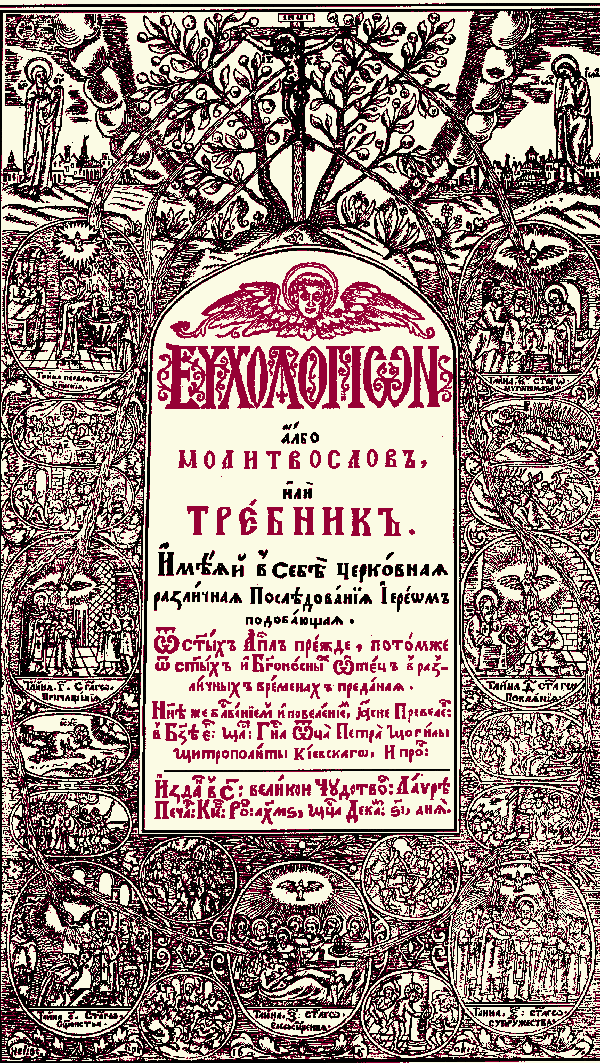
Front page of Petro Mohyla's Euchologion, 1646

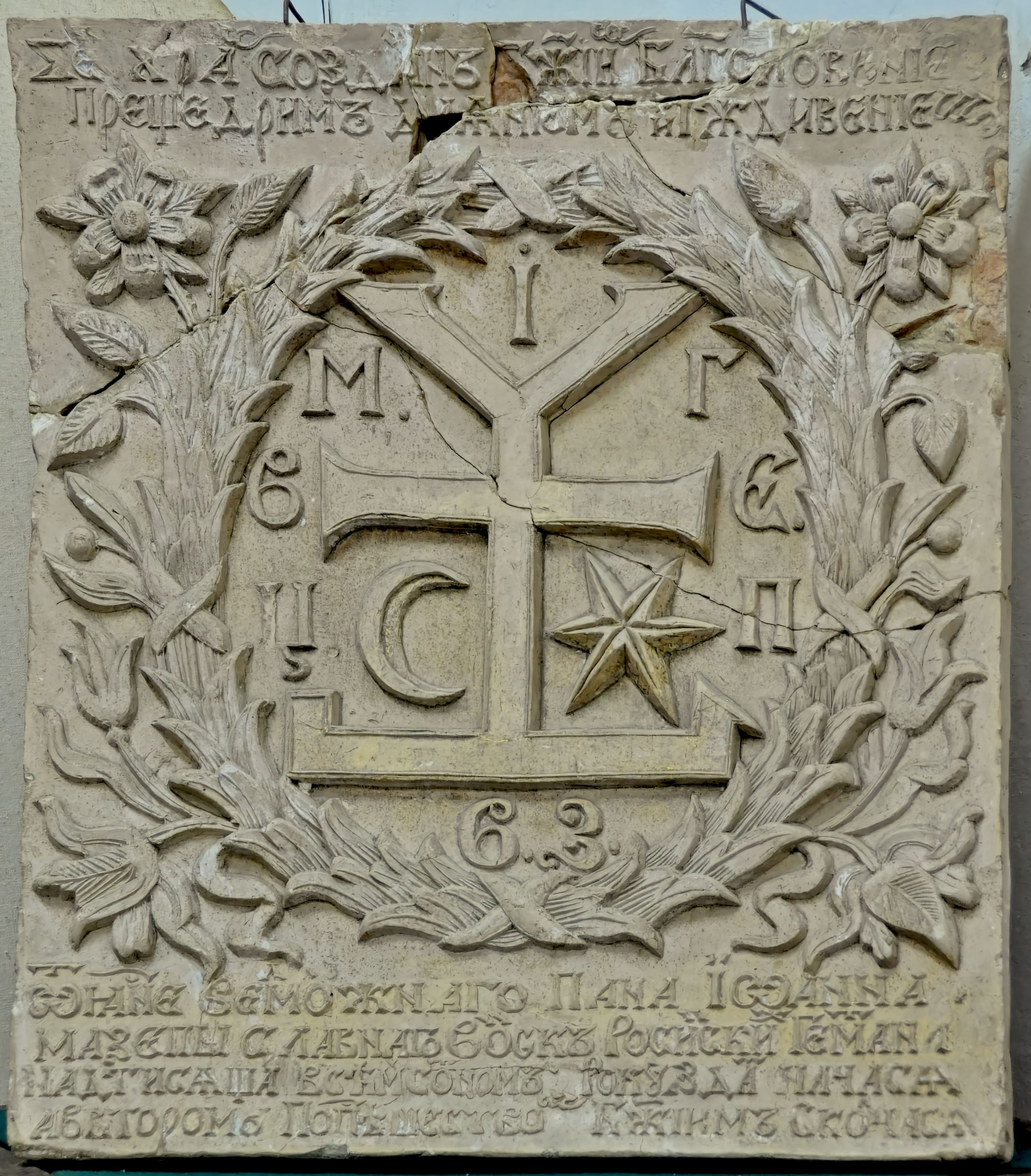
Hetman Mazepa's coat of arms from the facade of Chernihiv Collegium

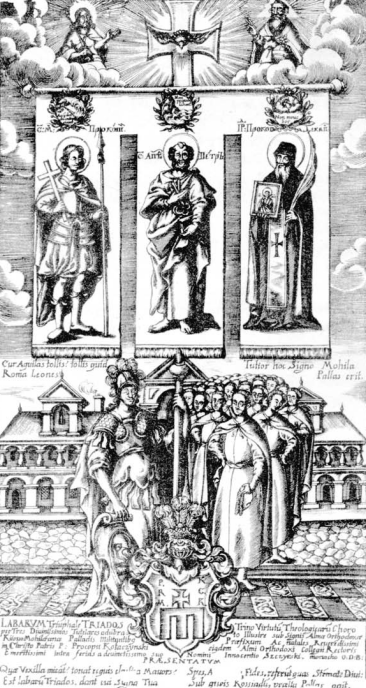
Engraving by Ivan Shchyrskyi honouring P. Kalachynskyi, rector of Kyiv Mohyla Academy, 1698

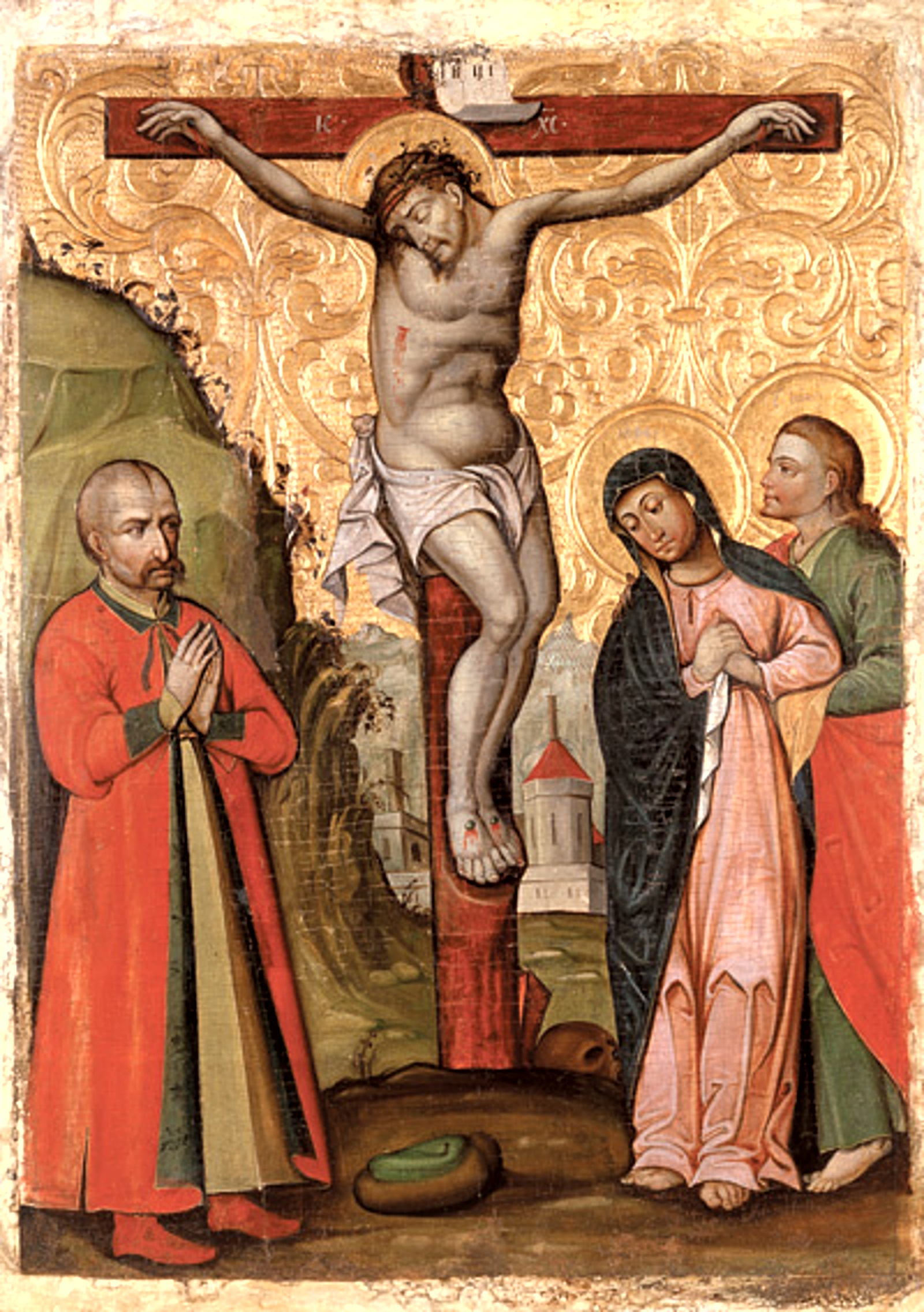
Crucifixion of Jesus on a 1699 Ukrainian Baroque icon from Pyriatyn, with a portrait of Lubny colonel Leontiy Svichka on the left

== Graphic design ==
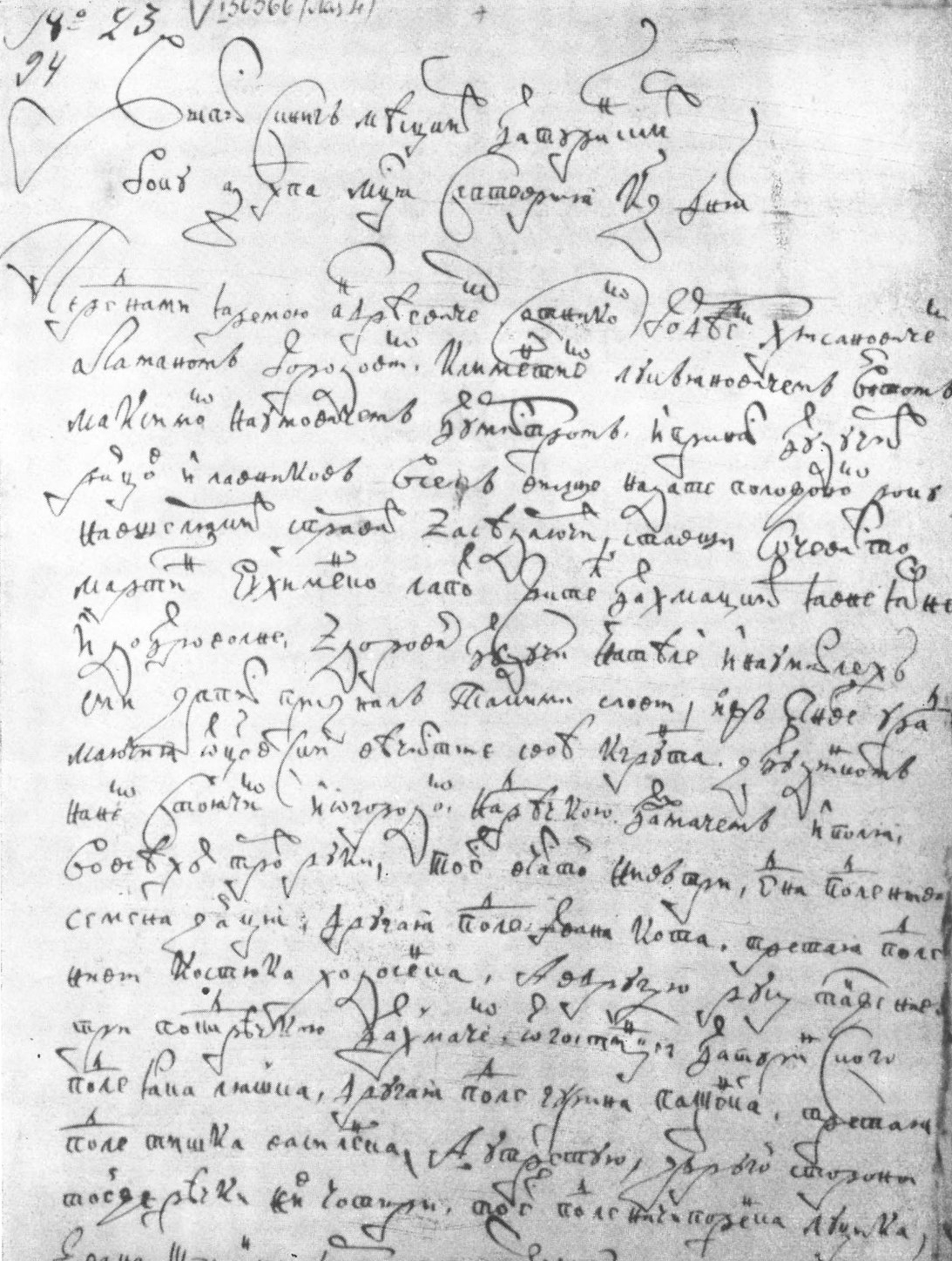
An example of Ukrainian Baroque handwriting from Baturyn, 1681

A Baroque-influenced type of Cyrillic handwriting script was used in documents of the Cossack Hetmanate in Ukraine during the 16-18th centuries.

== Baroque literature in Ukraine ==
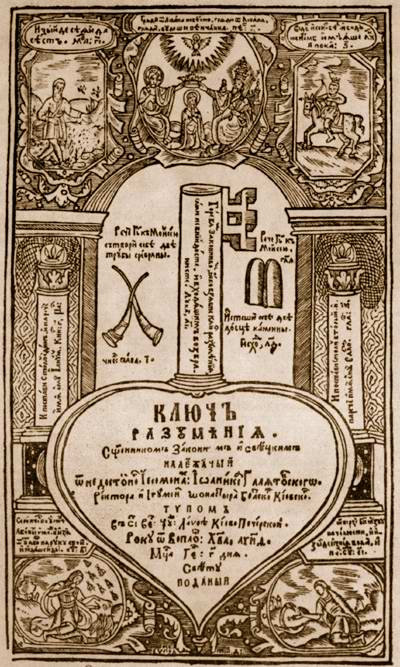
Ключъ разумЂнія (A Key to Understanding), a 1659 book of sermons published by Joannicius Galiatovsky in Kyiv

In Ukrainian lands Baroque literature flourished in the 17th and 18th centuries and was dominated by religious and spiritual topics, as most of its authors were clergymen. According to Dmytro Chyzhevsky, the first Ukrainian writer to use elements of Baroque style in his works was Ivan Vyshenskyi; Baroque aesthetics are also characteristic for some parts of the Galician-Volhynian Chronicle. Pivotal events in the development of Baroque literature in Ukraine were the foundation of Kyiv Brotherhood School (later known as Kyiv-Mohyla Academy) in 1615 and the restoration of Eastern Orthodox hierarchy in 1620. Main representatives of Baroque culture in Ukrainian lands during that time were Orthodox clergymen and professors of Kyiv Academy. Baroque poetry was a subject taught in Ukrainian higher schools until the end of the 18th century, producing a number of prominent authors creating in that style. The majority of Baroque authors in Ukraine created their works in the Church Slavonic language, but also included many elements from common Ukrainian speech of that time, as well as from the Polish and Russian languages. The flowering of Baroque literature in Ukraine helped lay the foundations for Russian secular literature.

=== Notable Baroque authors from Ukraine ===
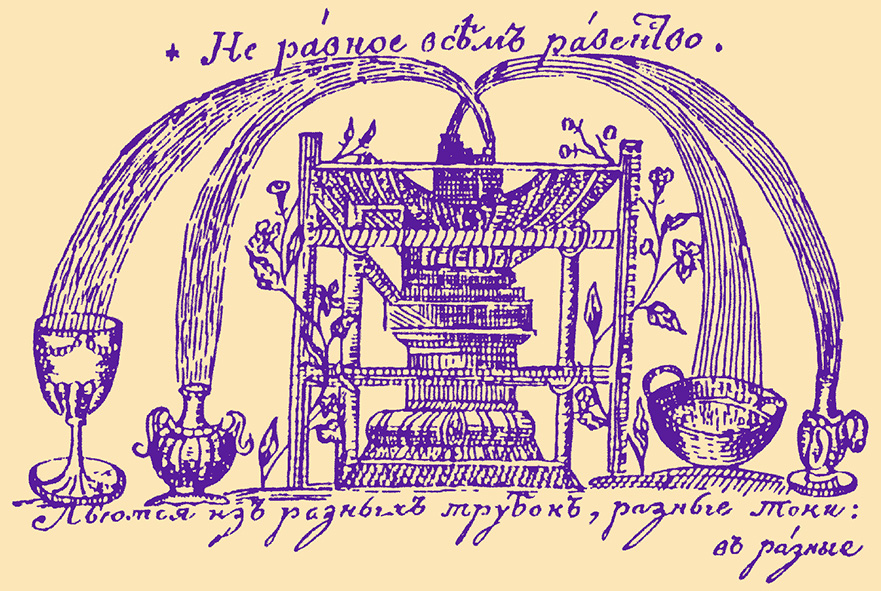
"Not equal equality" – a drawing by Hryhorii Skovoroda used by him to explain his philosophical views

- Pamvo Berynda (?–1632) – lexicographer, one of the pioneers of Ukrainian drama.
- Meletius Smotrytsky (1577–1633) – first Ukrainian author to fully embrace the Baroque tradition.
- Petro Mohyla (1596–1647) – Metropolitan of Kyiv.
- Jakub Gawatowicz (1598–1679) – Polish and Ukrainian writer, pedagogue and Catholic priest.
- Kyrylo Stavrovetsky-Tranquilion (?–1646) – Orthodox and Greek Catholic archimandrite.
- Innocent Giesel (c.1600-1683) – archimandrite of Kyiv Pechersk Lavra, rector of Kyiv Mohyla Academy
- Athanasius Kalnofoysky (fl.1638–1646) – monk of Kyiv Pechersk Lavra, wrote in Polish.
- Lazar Baranovych (1620–1693) – Orthodox archbishop.
- Joannicius Galiatovsky (c.1620–1688) – rector of Kyiv Academy, archimandrite.
- Antonii Radyvylovsky (c.1620–1688) – Orthodox hegumen and preacher.
- Danylo Tuptalo (1651–1709) – Orthodox bishop and saint.
- Stefan Yavorsky (1658–1722) – Orthodox bishop, head of the Most Holy Synod.
- Samiilo Velychko (1670–after 1728) – author of the first systematic history of the Cossack Hetmanate.
- Gabriel (Buzhynskyi) (1680–1731) – Orthodox bishop, philosopher and translator.
- Feofan Prokopovych (1681–1736) – Orthodox bishop, rector of Kyiv Academy.
- Manuil Kozachynsky (1699–1755) – pedagogue and dramatist.
- Symon (Todorsky) (1700–1754) – Orthodox bishop and theologian.
- Mytrofan Dovhalevskyi (fl.1732–1737) – dramatist and literary theorist.
- George (Konissky) (1717–1795) – Orthodox bishop, writer and dramatist.
- Paisius Velichkovsky (1722–1794) – Orthodox monk.
- Hryhorii Skovoroda (1722–1794) – poet and philosopher.
- Yuri Shcherbatskyi (1725–1754) – Orthodox monk and professor of Kyiv Academy.

== Baroque music in Ukraine ==
Excerpt from Kant to Saint George, a Ukrainian folk song of kant genre

During the Baroque era znamenny chant in Ukrainian music was replaced with part song. One of the most important musical theorists in Ukraine during that time was Mykola Dyletsky, a composer from Kyiv. Among other Ukrainian Baroque composers were Symeon Pekalytsky, Ivan Domaratsky and Herman Levytsky. Music was included in the curriculum of the Kyiv Mohyla Academy, whose alumni popularized Baroque musical genres such as vertep and kant songs.

Unlike its Western European counterparts, Ukrainian music of the Baroque era developed predominantly in the vocal genre and was characterized by the lack of operatic works. Ukrainian Baroque music preserved strong contacts with the folk tradition, which is demonstrated by the presence of many vernacular elements in its structure. This exchange of styles was promoted by the activities of itinerant dyaks and teachers, such as Gregory Skovoroda, as well as kobzars and lirnyks. The Baroque period signified the entrance of Ukrainian musical tradition onto the international scene, with folkloric compositions from Ukraine (e.g. The Cossack Rode over the Danube) appearing in Central European music collections of the time. An important figure in the development of Baroque music in Ukraine was Danylo Tuptalo (Demetrius of Rostov), who promoted the use of psalms outside of liturgy and worked in the genre of school drama. The Baroque era also contributed to the development of Ukrainian folk theatre. The musical and pedagogical tradition formed by Ukrainian Baroque left a lasting legacy, which can be seen in the works of late 18th-century composer Artemy Vedel and Romanticist music of the latter period.

== See also ==
- List of Ukrainian Baroque stone churches
- Ukrainian architecture
- Architecture of Kievan Rus'
- List of World Heritage Sites in Ukraine
- Baroque architecture in Lviv
