= Trinity Cathedral, Kyiv =

Orthodox cathedral in Kyiv, Ukraine

Coordinates: 50.5092°N 30.5863°E

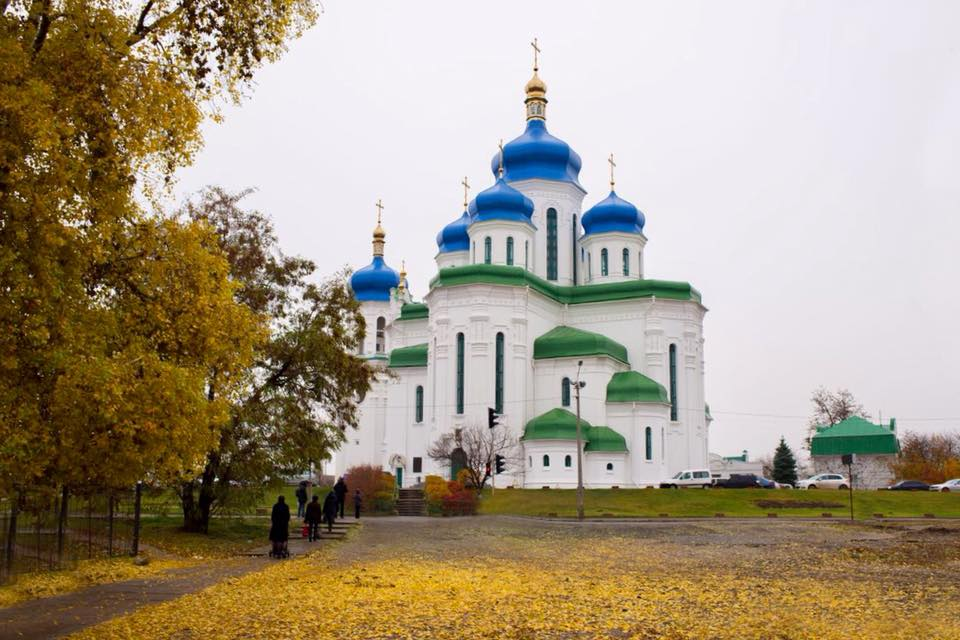
Cathedral of the Holy Trinity in Kyiv

The Troieshchyna Cathedral is one of the largest Ukrainian Orthodox churches in Kyiv. It was built on the outskirts of Kyiv, in the former village of Troieshchyna, between 1990 and 1997. The penticupolar church is dedicated to the Holy Trinity. A huge bell tower stands nearby. The style is that of a traditional Ukrainian Baroque cathedral.
