= Kant (music) =

Kant (from Latin cantus - singing) is a type of song which was widespread in Central and Eastern Europe during the 16-18th centuries and had roots in the religious singing tradition, although similar songs with secular contents are also known. Popular during the Baroque era, in the 17th century it spread to Ukraine as a result of Polish influence, and was included into the repertoire of lirnyks and students of the Kyiv Mohyla Academy. From Ukraine kant songs reached the Tsardom of Russia, where they were known from the second half of the 17th century.

Songs known as vivat kant (Ukrainian: віватний кант) emerged from panegyric poetry and were performed by students of Kyiv Academy to greet important visitors, including hetman Bohdan Khmelnytsky or Russian monarchs, becoming the base for the development of part song by composers such as Mykola Dyletsky.

== Notable authors and composers ==
Kant to the Queen of Heavens, recorded by Mykola Lysenko

Notable authors of kant songs in Ukraine included Kyrylo Trankvilion-Stavrovetsky, Danylo Tuptalo, Theophan Prokopovich, Epiphanius Slavinetsky, Timotheus Shcherbatsky and Gregory Skovoroda. The most popular spiritual songs of this type were printed in hymnals, the most prominent of which was published in Pochaiv Lavra in 1790-1791, meanwhile humorous and lyrical kants were spread in handwritten copies and demonstrated significant influence of folk tradition. In the 18th century the latter variety became the source of romance tradition. Some spiritual kants entered the repertoire of koliadka singers. Kant songs also influenced the works of a number of Ukrainian classical composers, including Maksym Berezovsky, Dmytro Bortniansky, Artemy Vedel and Semen Hulak-Artemovsky. Adaptation of a number of kants for choir singing was performed, among others, by Mykola Lysenko, Mykola Leontovych, Kyrylo Stetsenko and Oleksander Koshets.

== Examples ==
- Boh predvichnyi narodyvsia

== Musical characteristics ==
Kant songs are typically composed in a three-voice texture, with the top voice carrying the melody while the lower two voices provide harmonic support. This texture, sometimes called "three-part singing," was a distinctive feature that differentiated kant from earlier monodic church traditions. The harmonic style reflects the influence of Western polyphony, specifically Renaissance and Baroque compositional techniques that spread through Central and Eastern Europe during the 16th and 17th centuries.

Kants can be classified into several thematic categories: spiritual kants (духовні канти), which drew on religious and liturgical themes; panegyric kants (панегіричні канти), composed to honor rulers, hetmans, or other dignitaries; historical kants, which commemorated significant events of the Cossack period; and lyrical or love kants (ліричні канти), which addressed secular themes of love and everyday life.

The language of kant texts was often a mixture of Church Slavonic and vernacular Ukrainian, reflecting the transitional period of Ukrainian literary culture in the Baroque era. Some kants were written entirely in Ukrainian, while others retained the classical Church Slavonic conventions of liturgical poetry.

== Spread and regional influence ==
From its center in Kyiv, the kant tradition spread in multiple directions. The Kyiv Mohyla Academy, founded in 1632, played a central role in disseminating this musical form, as its students and graduates carried kant songs across Ukraine, Russia, and Belarus. The Pechersk Lavra's printing press and that of Pochaiv Lavra were instrumental in circulating collections of spiritual kants in printed form.

In Russia, kant songs became widespread from the late 17th century onward, particularly during the reign of Peter the Great, who encouraged the panegyric kant tradition as a tool for celebrating military victories and state occasions. This Russian variant eventually evolved into its own distinct tradition.

In the 19th and 20th centuries, Ukrainian ethnomusicologists documented surviving kant traditions in villages across Ukraine. The spiritual kants, in particular, showed remarkable continuity with the koliadka tradition, as some popular kants were incorporated into the Christmas carol repertoire and preserved in oral tradition long after their original liturgical context had changed.

== See also ==
- Ukrainian Baroque
