= St. Nicholas Cathedral, Nizhyn =

St. Nicholas the Wonderworker Cathedral
- Собор Святого Миколая Чудотворця
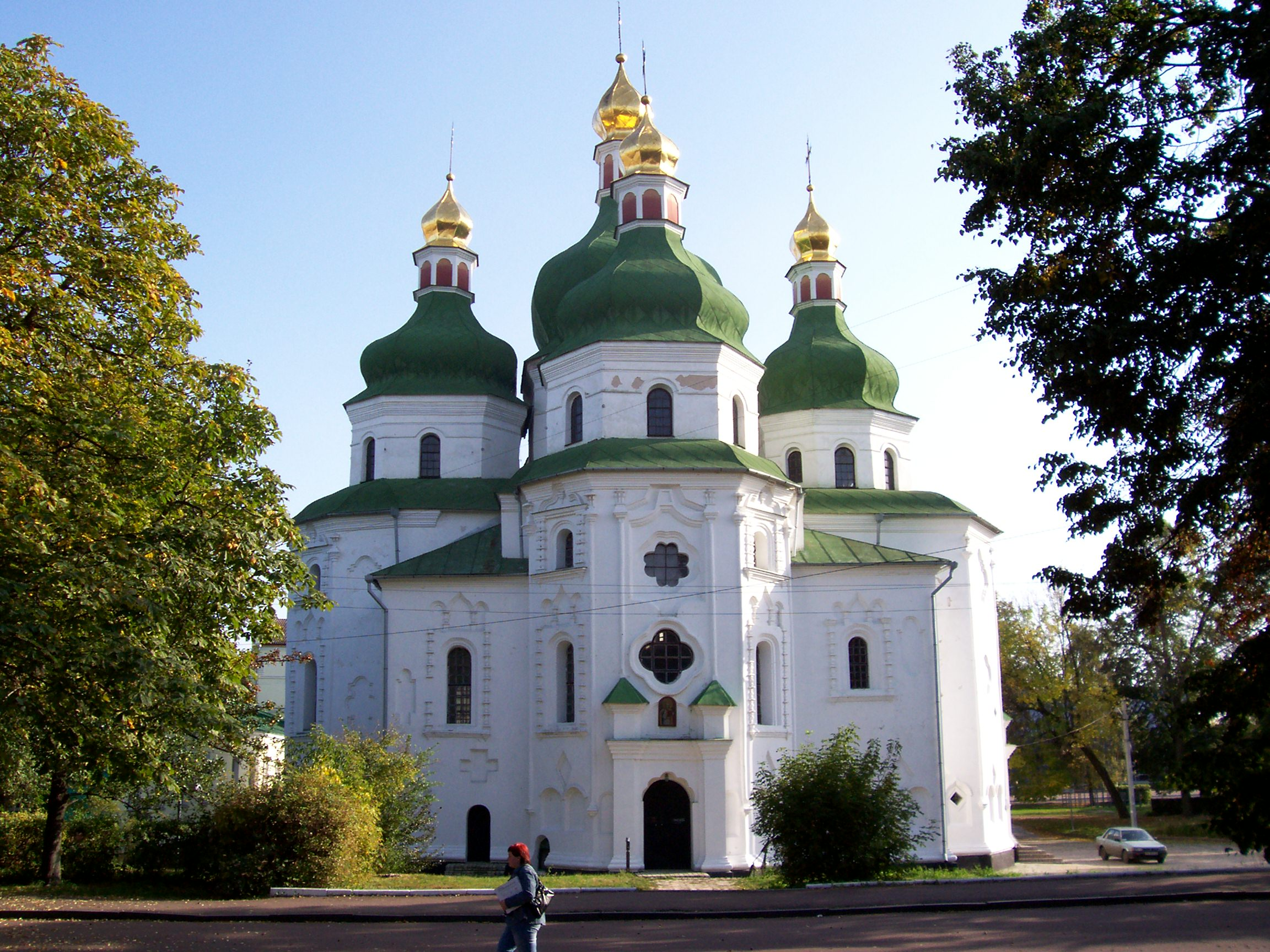
- The Cathedral in 2007
- St. Nicholas the Wonderworker Cathedral
- 51°02′53″N 31°53′13″E
- Location: Nizhyn
- Country: Ukraine
- Denomination: Ukrainian Orthodox Church (Moscow Patriarchate)

History
- Founded: from 1654 to 1658
- Dedication: Saint Nicholas

Architecture
- Style: Ukrainian Baroque

Immovable Monument of National Significance of Ukraine
- Official name: Миколаївський собор (St. Nicholas Cathedral)
- Type: Architecture
- Reference no.: 250062

The St. Nicholas Cathedral in Nizhyn (Ukrainian: Собор Святого Миколая Чудотворця, romanized: Sobor Sviatoho Mykolaia Chudotvortsia; Russian: Свято-Николаевский кафедральный собор) is the main Eastern Orthodoxy church of Nizhyn eparchy in Ukraine. The powerful centric 55-metres high building with five domes has become a prototype Ukrainian baroque architecture of stone five-domed cruciform churches. The cathedral reproduces in brick the techniques conventional to Ukrainian wooden folk architecture.

The special and parade role of building is likewise emphasized in the interior, where both sides of the main entrance are arranged with placing special loggias for regimental starshyna. The predominant location of the cathedral among the surrounding city buildings is still beyond the competition, although the public centre moved to the other square. The main axis of the city goes from the market the Oster River.

== See also ==
- Ukrainian Baroque
- All Saints Church, Nizhyn
