= Dmytro Chyzhevsky =

Ukrainian scholar

- Дмитро Іванович Чижевський
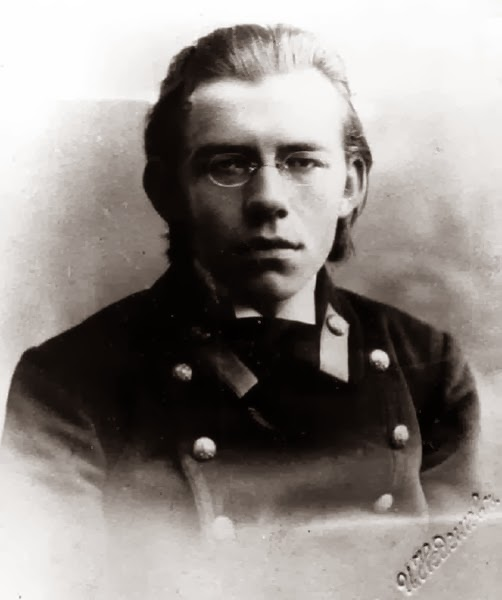
- Dmytro Chyzhevsky as a high school student
- Born: March 23, 1894; Oleksandriia, Russian Empire (now Ukraine)
- Died: April 18, 1977 (aged 83); Heidelberg, West Germany
- Occupations: Philosopher, literary historian, philologist

Dmytro Ivanovych Chyzhevsky (Ukrainian: Дмитро Іванович Чижевський) (March 23, 1894 – April 18, 1977) was a Ukrainian-born scholar of Slavic literature, history, culture and philosophy.

== Biography ==
=== Early life ===
Dmytro Chyzhevsky was born of Russian-Polish-Ukrainian ancestry on 23 March 1894, at Oleksandriia, in the Kherson Governorate of the Russian Empire, near the Black Sea. His first interest was philosophy, and his teachers were Nikolay Lossky, Vasyl Zenkivskyi, and Georgy Chelpanov. From 1911 to 1913 he studied philosophy and literature at the University of St. Petersburg and afterwards at the department of history and philology at St. Volodymyr University of Kyiv, where he graduated in 1919.

== Political activity and philosophical views ==
During the Russian Revolution he was involved in politics and was a member of the Mensheviks. After teaching at high school in Kyiv from 1919 to 1921, he emigrated from Soviet Russia to Germany and continued his philosophical studies at Heidelberg during the winter semester 1921–22, and then at Freiberg, where he was a student of Edmund Husserl (SS 1922- WS1923/24).

He lived in Prague from 1924 to 1932, where he became a professor in the Ukrainian university there, and was a member of the prestigious Prague linguistic circle, a group of linguists and philologists that included Roman Jakobson.

In 1932 he moved to the University of Halle in Germany, where he completed his dissertation in Philosophy, Hegel in Russland, under Adhémar Gelb and Paul Menzer. During World War II, Chyzhevsky took a position at the University of Marburg.

After the war he moved to the United States of America in 1949, and became a professor of Slavic studies at Harvard University.

In 1956 he returned to Germany and settled in Heidelberg as a professor of Slavic studies at the Heidelberg University, where he remained until his death on April 18, 1977.

He had a daughter called Tatjana Čiževska alias Tatiana or Tatyana Marshak (Тетяна Чижевска / Маршак (1924—1986), who was a professor of Slavic studies at various universities in the United States, particularly Wayne State University (Detroit, Michigan).

== Work ==
Chyzhevsky wrote on a broad range of subjects, including folklore, history, philosophy, linguistics, Slavic and comparative literature. He wrote monographs on the Ukrainian philosopher Hryhorii Skovoroda (1974) and the German philosopher Georg Wilhelm Friedrich Hegel (1934). He is also known for his studies of the Russian writer, Nikolai Gogol.

He argued for the existence of a literary baroque and wrote several books on the subject, becoming one of the foremost authorities on baroque literature.

=== Published works ===
- Льоґіка. Конспект лекцій, прочитаних у Вищому Педагогічному Інституті ім. М. Драгоманова у Празі в літньому семестрі 1924 року. Прага: Сіяч. [Logic. Synopsis of lectures delivered at the Higher Pedagogical Institute named after M. Drahomanov in Prague in the summer semester of 1924. [In Ukrainian]. Prague: Siyach.] (1924)
- Фільософія на Україні. Спроба історіографії. Прага: Сіяч. [Philosophy in Ukraine. An attempt at historiography. [In Ukrainian]. Prague: Siyach.] (1926)
- Die abendländische Philosophie in der alten Ukraine. In: Abhandlungen des Ukrainischen Wissenschaft lichen Institutes in Berlin (Bd. I, SS. 71—89). Berlin und Leipzig: Walter de Gruyter & Co. (1927)
- Фільософія на Україні. Спроба історіографії. Видання друге, виправлене й доповнене. Ч. I. Прага: Сіяч [Philosophy in Ukraine. An attempt at historiography. The second edition corrected and supplemented. P. I. [In Ukrainian]. Prague: Siyach.] (1928/29)
- Renaissance und das ukrainische Geistesleben. In: Abhandlungen des Ukrainischen Wissenschaft lichen Institutes in Berlin (Bd. II, SS. 52—55). Berlin, Leipzig: Walter de Gruyter & Co. (1929)
- Нариси з історії філософії на Україні. Прага: Український Громадський Видавничий Фонд. [Essays on the history of philosophy in Ukraine. [In Ukrainian]. Prague: Ukrainian Public Publishing Fund.] (1931)
- (Freiburg i. Br.). Bericht über die russische und ukrainische Literatur zur Geschichte der Philosophie in den Jahren 1929 und 1930. In: Archiv für Geschichte der Philosophie (Bd. 40, H. 2, SS. 329—350). S.l. (1931)
- Dostojevskij Studien (1931)
- Hegel bei den Slaven (1934)
- Фільософія Г. С. Сковороди [Philosophy of H. S. Skovoroda] (1934)
- Štúrova filozofia života (1941)
- Українська філософія. In: Українська культура. Курс лекцій за редакцією Д. Антоновича (сс. 128—146). Реґенсбурґ: Український технічно-господарський інститут. [Ukrainian philosophy. [In Ukrainian]. In: Ukrainian culture. Course of lectures edited by D. Antonovych (pp. 128—146). Regensburg: Ukrainian Technical and Economic Institute.] (1947)
- Культурно-історичні епохи (1948)
- Geschichte der altrussischen Literatur: Kiever Epoche (1948 and 1960)
- Outline of Comparative Slavic Literatures (1952)
- On Romanticism in Slavic Literatures (1957)
- Das heilige Russland (1959)
- Russland zwischen Ost und West (1961)
- Russische Literaturgeschichte des 19 Jahrhunderts (1964)
- Comparative History of Slavic Literatures (1971)
- Skovoroda, Dichter, Denker, Mystiker (1974)
- A History of Ukrainian Literature (1975)
