= Joannicius Galiatovsky =

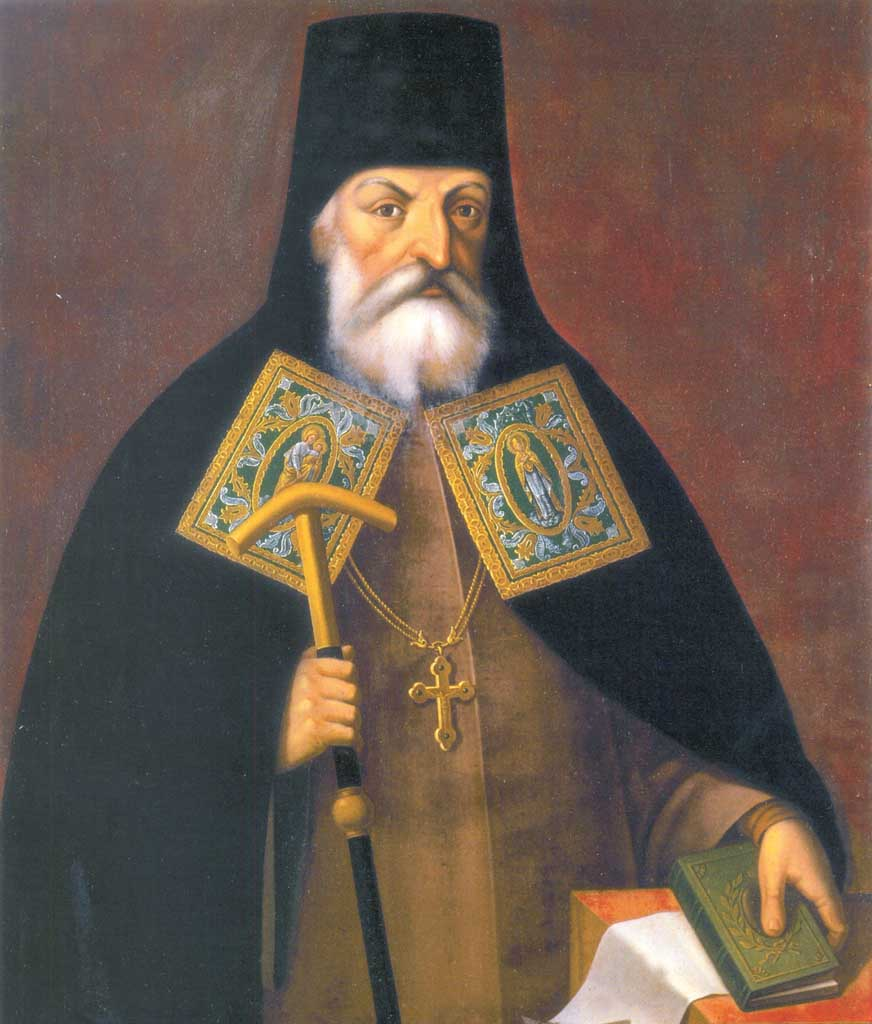
Galiatovsky on a posthumous portrait

Joannicius Galiatovsky (Ukrainian: Йоаникій (Іоанікій) Ґалятовський, c. 1620–1688) was a writer and Eastern Orthodox clergyman from Volhynia. Known for creating numerous religious treatises and sermons, as well as works on Baroque literary theory, Galiatovsky made an important contribution to the emergence of modern Ukrainian literature.

== Biography ==
A native of Volhynia, Galiatovsky studied at the Kyiv Mohyla Academy, later working as its teacher. In 1657-1669 he served as the academy's rector, as well as hegumen of Kyiv's Brotherhood Monastery. In 1669 Galiatovsky took the post of archimandrite at the Yeletskyi Monastery in Chernihiv, where he remained until his death in 1688. Following the deposition of Demian Mnohohrishny from the post of hetman in 1672, Galiatovsky refused to shelter his brother, Chernihiv colonel Vasyl Mnohohrishny, who was fleeing from Muscovite voivodes, in his monastery.

== Works ==
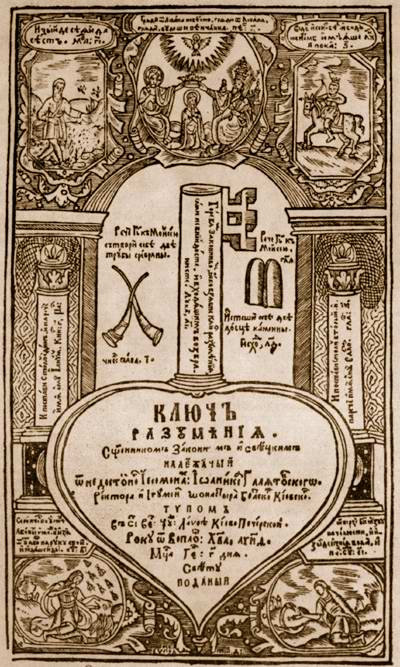
Title page of Ключъ разумЂнія (Kyiv, 1659)

Galiatovsky authored more than 20 books, among the most notable of which are the sermon collection Ключъ разумЂнія (Key to Understanding) and the treatise Наука, албо способъ зложеня казаня (Science, or Way of Creating a Sermon), both published in 1659. He also authored two collections of stories dedicated to Marian apparitions: Небо новое (New Heaven, 1655) and Скарбница потребная (Useful Treasury, 1676); several treatises directed against the Union, Catholicism, Protestantism, paganism, Judaism and Islam: Месіа правдивий (True Messiah, 1669), Łabędź z piórami swemi (Swan with His Feathers, 1675), Rozmowa białocerkiewska (A Dialogue in Bila Tserkva, 1676), Alphabetum rozmaitym heretykom (Alphabet of Various Heretics, 1681), Alkoran Mahometów (Muhammad's Quran, 1683), Боги поганскії (Pagan Gods, 1686) etc; as well as two theological treatises: Гріхи розмаїтії (Various Sins, 1685) and Душі людей умерлих (Souls of the Dead, 1687).

Galiatovsky's sermons are distinguished by having been composed in colloquial Ukrainian language spoken by his flock. As such, his literary heritage forms an important stage in the history of Ukrainian literature. His poetry is characterized with widespread use of emblematics typical of Baroque literature of the time.

In his political texts Galiatovsky expresses pro-Commonwealth and anti-Ottoman views. A the same time, he authored the first fundamental work on the topic of Islam in Eastern Europe, and one of his stories dedicated to Virgin Mary contains a direct quote from the Quran, despite the author himself never having read the book in its original edition. Among other events, Galiatovsky's anti-Islamic treatise depicted the Ottoman-Persian Wars as being caused by the Turks worshipping Muhammad, and Persians being devoted to Ali.

== See also ==
- Ukrainian Baroque#Baroque literature in Ukraine
