= Bell Tower of Saint Sophia Cathedral =

Bell tower in Kyiv, Ukraine

- Дзвіниця Софійського собору (Ukrainian)
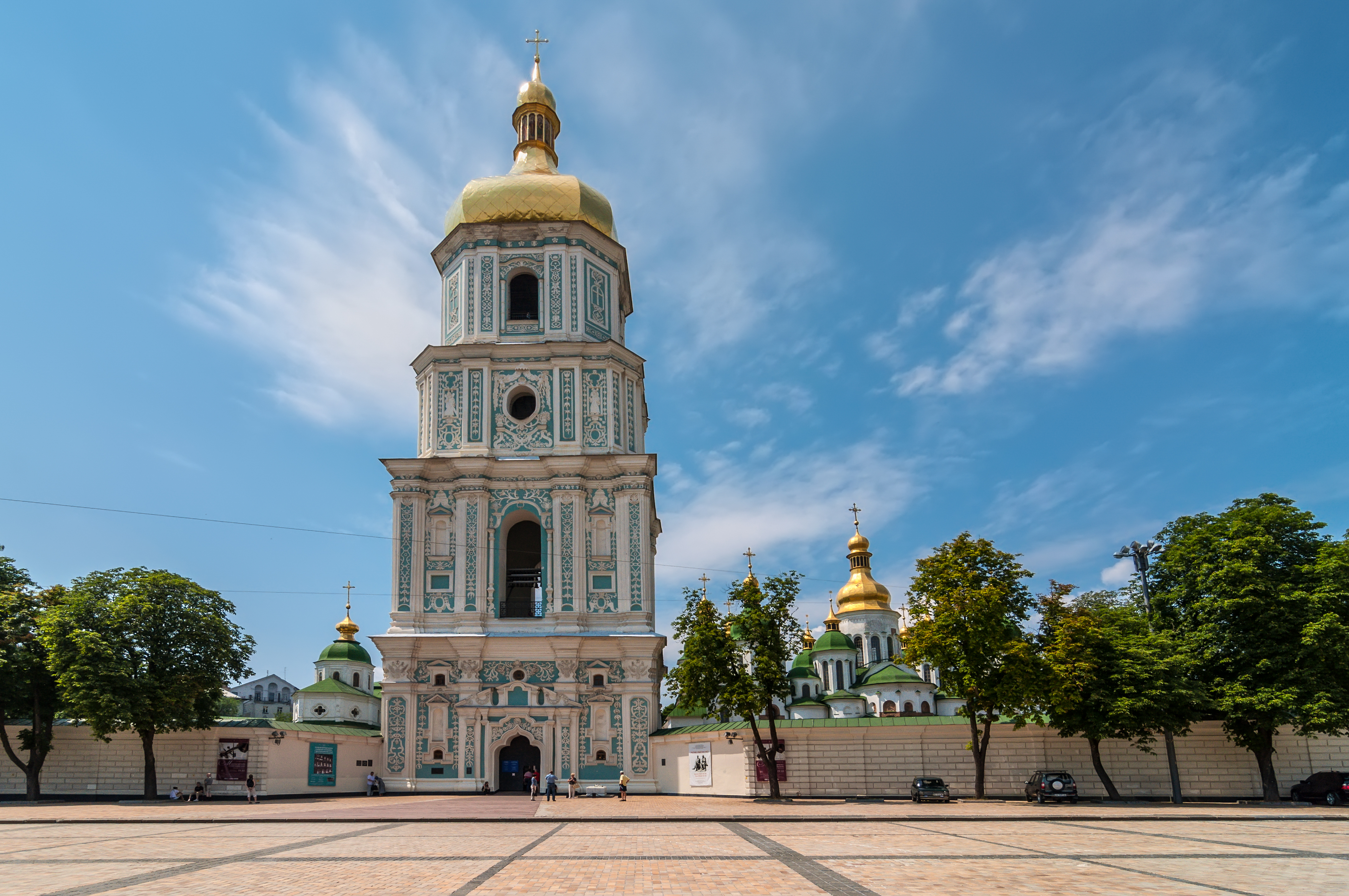
- Bell Tower of Saint Sophia Cathedral, Kyiv
- Interactive map of Bell Tower of Saint Sophia Cathedral
- 50°27′10.4″N 30°30′55.1″E
- Location: Volodymyrska Street, 24, Kyiv, Ukraine

History
- Beginning date: 1699
- Built: 1706

Site notes
- Height: 76 metres (249 ft)
- Architect: Gottfried Johann Schädel
- Restored: 1744–1748

Immovable Monument of National Significance of Ukraine
- Official name: Дзвіниця (Bell tower)
- Type: Architecture
- Reference no.: 260072/2-Н

UNESCO World Heritage Site
- Official name: Saint-Sophia Cathedral
- Part of: Kyiv: Saint-Sophia Cathedral and Related Monastic Buildings, Kyiv-Pechersk Lavra
- Criteria: i, ii, iii, iv
- Reference: 527
- Inscription: 1990 (14th Session)
- Endangered: 2023

The Bell Tower of Saint Sophia Cathedral in Kyiv is a monument of Ukrainian architecture in the style of Ukrainian (Cossack) Baroque. It is one of the Ukrainian national symbols and symbols of the city of Kyiv.

It was built in 1699–1706 at the expense of Hetman Ivan Mazepa. It was significantly rebuilt in 1744–1748 according to the design of Gottfried Johann Schädel, and in 1851–1852 the fourth tier was added according to the design of the diocesan architect Paul Sparro. The bell tower is vertically dominant in the Upper City or Old Kyiv. It is part of the National Reserve "Sophia of Kyiv."

The tower has been listed as a UNESCO World Heritage Site under No. 527 (in the complex of monastic buildings of Saint Sophia). It is a monument of cultural heritage of national significance.

The height of the bell tower is 76 meters.

== Architecture ==
=== Description ===
The bell tower of St. Sophia Cathedral belongs to the tower type of structures, four-tiered. The base in the plan measures 20 by 14 metres (66 by 46 ft). The height is 76 metres (249 ft). In the direction from west to east, a passage passes through the bell tower. The first tier consists of cross walls with a thickness of 1.5 to 2 m (5 to 7 ft), converging at right angles. It serves as a support for higher tiers, the wall thickness of which is smaller – presumably to reduce the load on the first one. In the first tier, vaulted arches overlap, while the upper three tiers do not have inter-storey overlappings. The tower consists of four corner pylons connected along the perimeter in the area where the tiers meet.

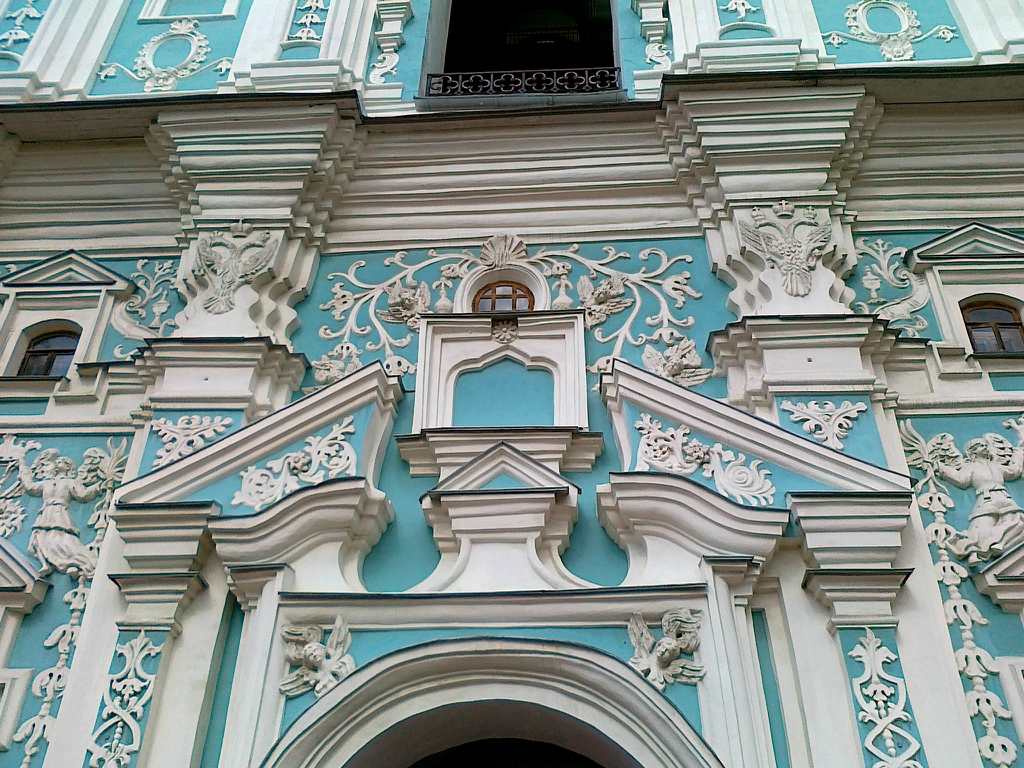
Decor of the exterior wall on the western facade above the promenade.

=== Composition ===
From the original structure, built in 1699–1706, only the first and part of the second tier have been preserved to this day. Despite this, the architecture and decor of the bell tower are designed in the same style, so they are perceived as a single whole. The two lower tiers are quadrangular in plan, and the two upper tiers are octagonal. Above them rises a golden cupola, covered with gilding and topped with a golden crown and a golden cross.

The four tiers gradually taper upwards and are crowned with tiered golden domes, which emphasize the bell tower's grandeur. The tiered composition is indicated by cornices of a complex profile, vertically the surfaces of all walls are divided by flat Pilasters, between which decorated niches are located. The top three tiers have open air archways or windows. Above the passage on the first floor there is a closed storage room and a staircase, on the north side of the passage.

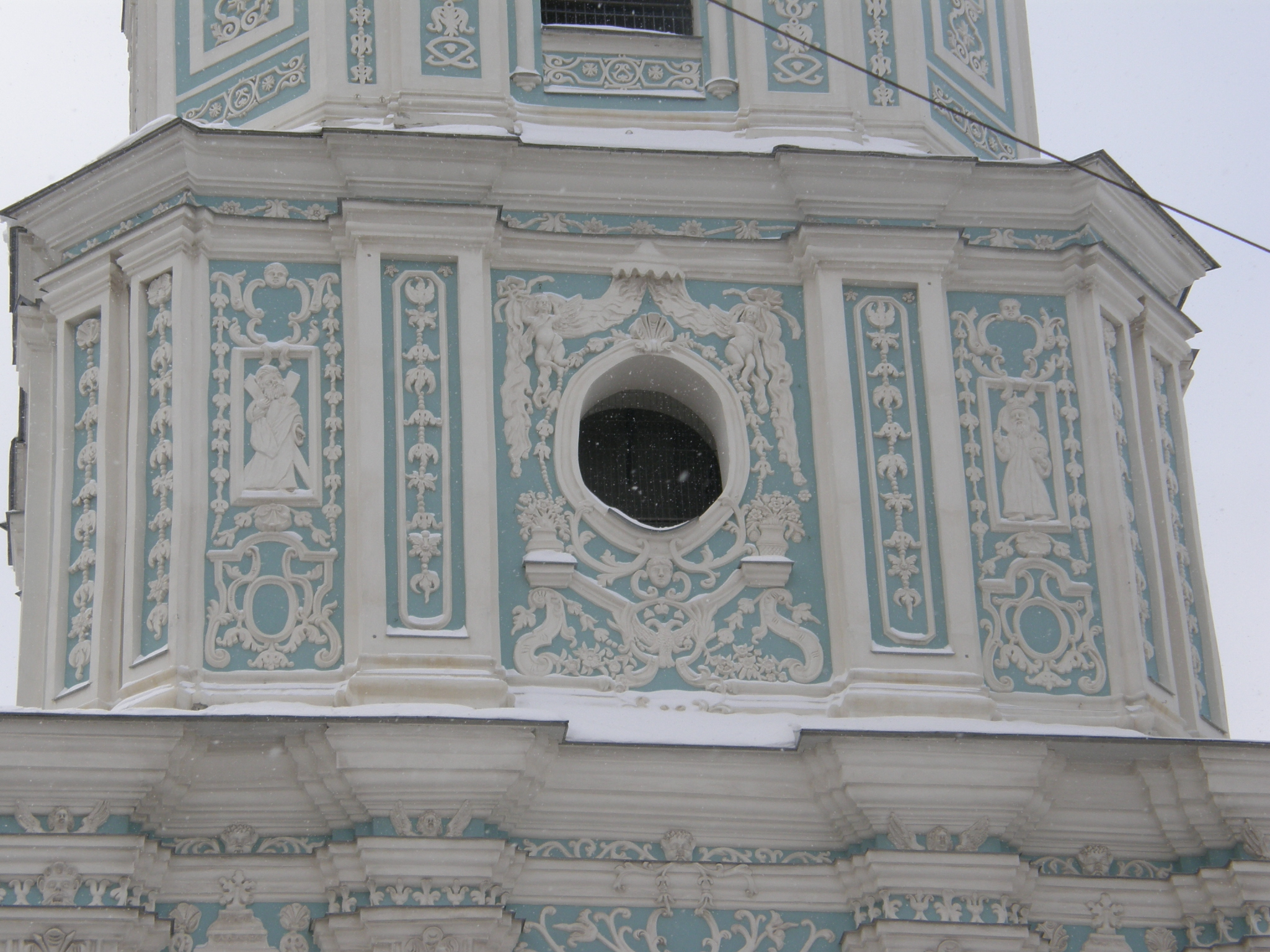
The third tier of the bell tower (eastern facade); you can see the figures of the Apostle Andrew and Saint Volodymyr.

=== Decor ===
The sculptural decor of the bell tower perfectly interacts with its architectural composition. It is decorated with various stucco ornaments, which are interwoven with bas-reliefs and dynamic figures of angels, Ukrainians, images of Cupids, flowers in baskets, bouquets, Garlands, Baldachins over niches, heraldic double-headed eagles and more.

The eastern facade, facing Sophia Square (Sophiska Ploshcha), is decorated on the third tier with figures of Andrew the Apostle and Prince Volodymyr – the founders of Christianity in Rus-Ukraine. The western facade, facing the monastery courtyard, is decorated with figures of the Archangel Raphael and the Apostle Timothy; the bell tower was rebuilt under heavenly patrons the Metropolitans Raphael Zaborovsky (1731–1747), and Timothy Shcherbatsky (1748–1757).

The stucco decoration of the facades were made by masters from Zhovkva Ivan to Stepan Stobensky. Almost all the stucco has survived, except that it was damaged by shells during the war.

=== Color scheme ===
The color of the walls of the bell tower before its reconstruction in 1851–1852 was polychrome. After the reconstruction of 1744–1748, the walls were painted blue, the stucco ornament was ivory, and the figures of saints, angels, etc. were painted according to the following scheme: the face — yellow, hair — black, and the outfits — multicolored.

After the restoration and of the superstructure of the fourth tier, the bell tower was repainted in only two colors. This color scheme has been preserved to this day. In all variants, the color of modeling and decoration remained white or ivory, and the walls were painted in turquoise tones of varying intensity. Nowadays, the ornaments are painted in bright white, the walls-in turquoise, which in combination with the radiance of the golden cupola creates a tinge of solemn conviviality for the bell tower.

== History ==
=== The first known bell tower ===
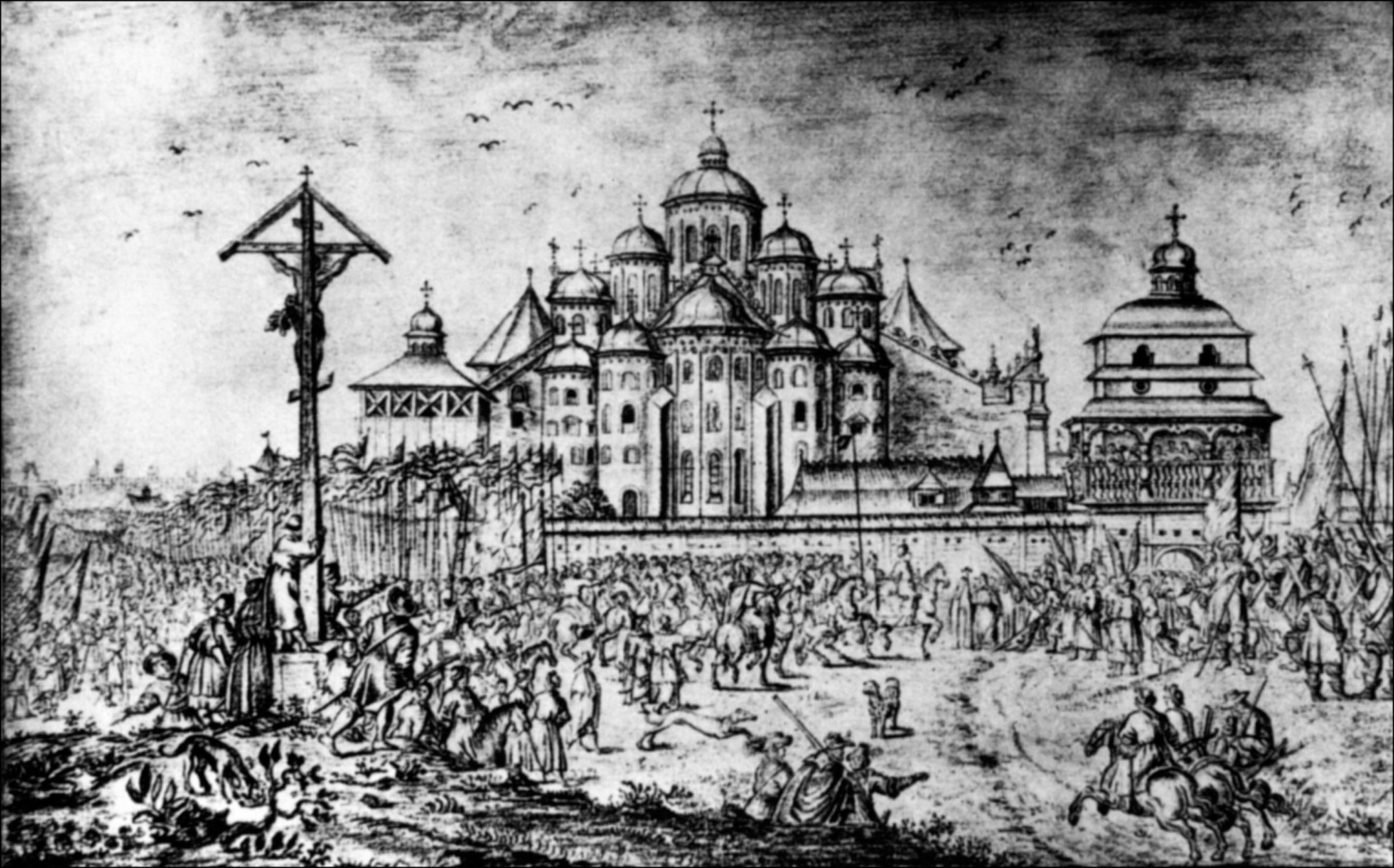
The first bell tower (right) in a drawing by A. van Westerfeld (1651).

The first known historical bell tower was wooden and stood on the north-eastern side of the cathedral, in contrast to the modern one, which was built to the south-east of it. The wooden bell tower is depicted both in a drawing by the Dutch artist Abraham van Westerfeld (1651) and in a plan of the city of Kyiv by Colonel Ushakov (1695). It was probably built by Petro Mohyla during the reconstruction of St. Sophia Cathedral in 1633–1647 – at the same time a convent was established here with his help, and its territory was surrounded by a high wooden fence or wall.

This bell tower was four-tiered, with an entrance arch in the form of a semicircle on the first tier, over which loopholes were made in the log house. On the second floor there was an open gallery on carved pillars, surrounded by a parapet of carved balusters. On the third tier there were round windows, and on the fourth – holes for bells and the bells themselves. It was topped with a dome.

A Syrian traveler, Paul of Aleppo, who visited Kyiv in 1654 and 1656, when describing Saint Sophia Cathedral, mentioned a very tall wooden bell tower, the tallest he had ever seen. He also saw a large bell in it.

The old bell tower burned down during a large fire on the territory of the monastery in 1697, during which almost all the wooden monastery buildings were destroyed.

It has been suggested that the tall wooden building with a quadrangular top, shown in the figure of 1651 to the left of the cathedral, is another bell tower.

=== Period before reconstruction ===
The new baroque stone bell tower was built in 1699 and completed in 1706. Thus, it was the first stone structure in the monastery, except for the cathedral. Construction was carried out at the expense of Hetman Ivan Mazepa and with the assistance of Metropolitan Varlaam (Yasinsky) of Kyiv. The name of its architect is unknown. In the documents, there is only a mention of one of the builders – the "stone business apprentice" Savva Yakovlev, a resident of the Kyiv Pechersk town. The bell tower was first built three-tiered with a small dome, crowned with a high spire and a cross.

The location of the bell tower to the east of the cathedral is unconventional, although it is not prohibited by the canons (church laws). The bell tower was built in this place to form a clear urban planning ensemble: thus, a visual connection was achieved with the similar bell tower of the St. Michael's monastery, and the perspective from all four gates of the Upper City was closed: Saint Sophia, Pechersk, Golden and Lviv.

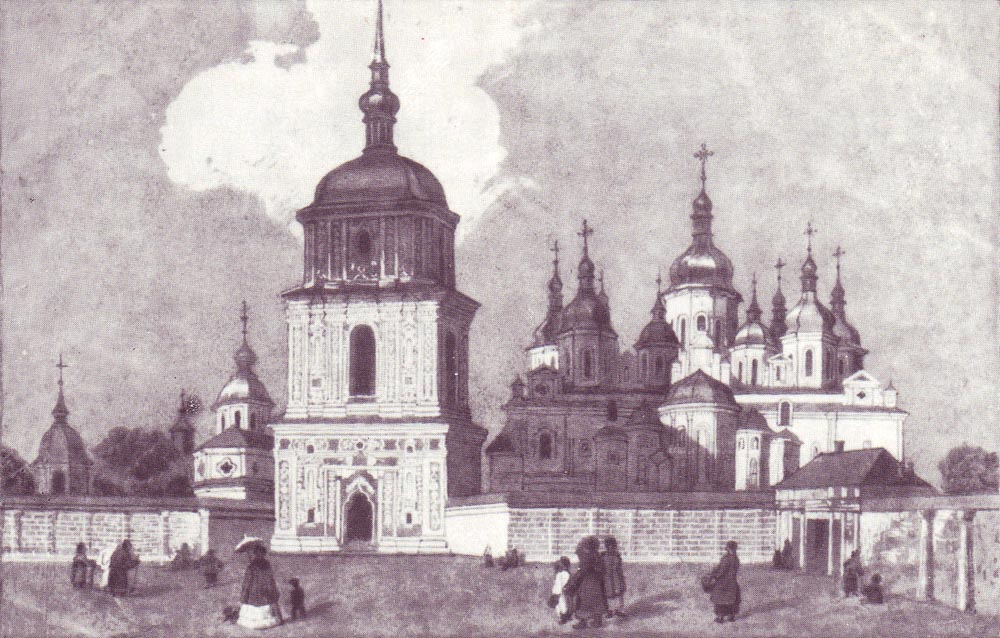
Sophia Bell Tower after the reconstruction in 1812. Watercolor by M. Sazhina, 1840s

In 1709, a solemn meeting of Peter I and his commanders took place near the bell tower's walls after the victory in the Battle of Poltava, for which the bell tower was often called "triumphal."

Since the bell tower was built on the site of an ancient ravine, its upper tiers began to collapse very soon after construction. The structure had cracks, which after the earthquake of 1742 intensified and began to threaten the collapse of the entire building. Therefore, in 1744, under the direction of the architect Johann Schedel, the reconstruction of the bell tower was started. The third tier and part of the second tier were dismantled "almost to the bells." But new upper and middle tiers were built, also in the Ukrainian baroque style. It was crowned by a baroque dome with a gilded Spire, and painted with stars on a blue background. The works were carried out by order and at the expense of Metropolitan Raphael Zaborovsky. Reconstruction was completed in 1748.

After the closure of the monastery in 1786 and the secularization of the lands of the monastery estates, many church buildings began to fall into disrepair due to lack of funds at Saint Sophia Cathedral. By the end of the 18th century, the bell tower also fell into disrepair. Lightning struck the top of the bell tower in 1807, burning down the dome, which was restored only in 1812 "according to a new profile" in the classicist style. The new dome also had a spire and, according to measurement drawings, generally repeated the shape of the old one, but because of its not very good proportions, the bell tower seemed somewhat squat. This was reinforced by the fact that by the middle of the 19th century, the surrounding area was already built up with multi-story buildings, and the bell tower began to lose its dominant position in the development of both the Square and the Upper City.

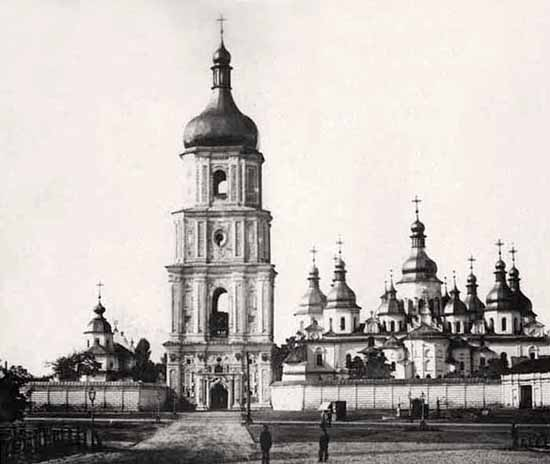
The bell tower is already four-tiered, photo taken at the end of the 19th century.

=== Four-tiered bell tower: period before the 1930s ===
During the repair and restoration works of 1851–1852 in the complex of buildings of the former Sophia Monastery, it was decided that the height and appearance of the bell tower did not correspond to its significance. Therefore, by personal order of Emperor Nicholas I, who visited Kyiv in 1850, it was decided to add a fourth tier. According to the project of the diocesan architect Pavlo Sparro (Academician Fedor Solntsev also took part in the design), it was actualized in the Baroque style, with a high baroque pear-shaped wooden cupola covered with gilded golden sheets.

The new tier generally repeated the stucco decoration of the lower tiers, but somewhat changed the proportions of the bell tower, giving them harmony. The height of the bell tower reached 76 meters. This allowed it to once again dominate the architecture of the Old Town. After the reconstruction, the building was painted in two colors, which gave it a look close to modern.

During the signing ceremony of the Unification Act between the Ukrainian People's Republic and the West Ukrainian People's Republic on 22 January 1919, the bell towers rang.

=== Soviet period ===
In 1930, the bell tower together with St. Sophia Cathedral was closed for worship and became a part of the All-Ukrainian Museum Complex, which was established in 1926 in the area of the Kyiv Pechersk Lavra. Probably, all the bells were removed from the bell tower at that time, except for Mazepa. It is thought that only this bell was left because it has an extremely original ornament and it had great artistic value, so it was decided to leave it as a museum piece. In 1934, the territory of the former Sophia Monastery was declared a State Historical and Architectural Reserve.

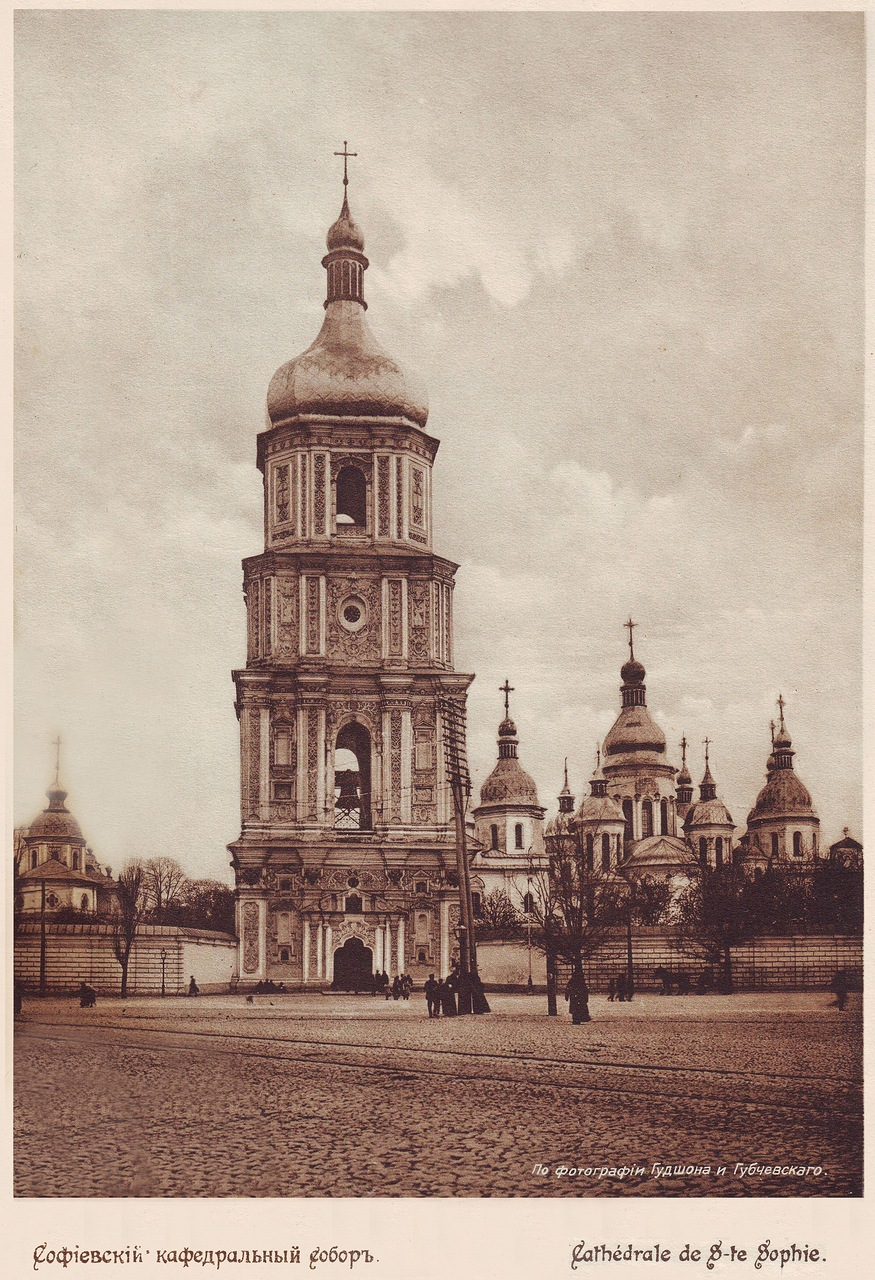
Postcard from 1911

At the beginning of the Second World War, all the domes of Kyiv's churches which were covered with gilding, were painted over. This was done because they reflected light even on a moonless night, which could be a good guide for German pilots. However, after the war, the domes were not repainted. Therefore, the question of updating the appearance of the bell tower and its restoration arose during the preparations around 1950 for the celebration of the three hundredth anniversary of the Pereiaslav Council.

Under the supervision of overseers, the workers tore the paint and the gilding from the bell tower, put it all in containers, and sent it to the mint in Leningrad. From there they were sent ready-made sheets of micron-thick gold, with which to cover the domes. The bell tower was restored in 1953. Works of restoration of stucco ornaments and architectural details were carried out. The bell tower, which at the time of restoration was completely white, was painted blue and white.

Another restoration was carried out in 1972.

=== Modern period ===
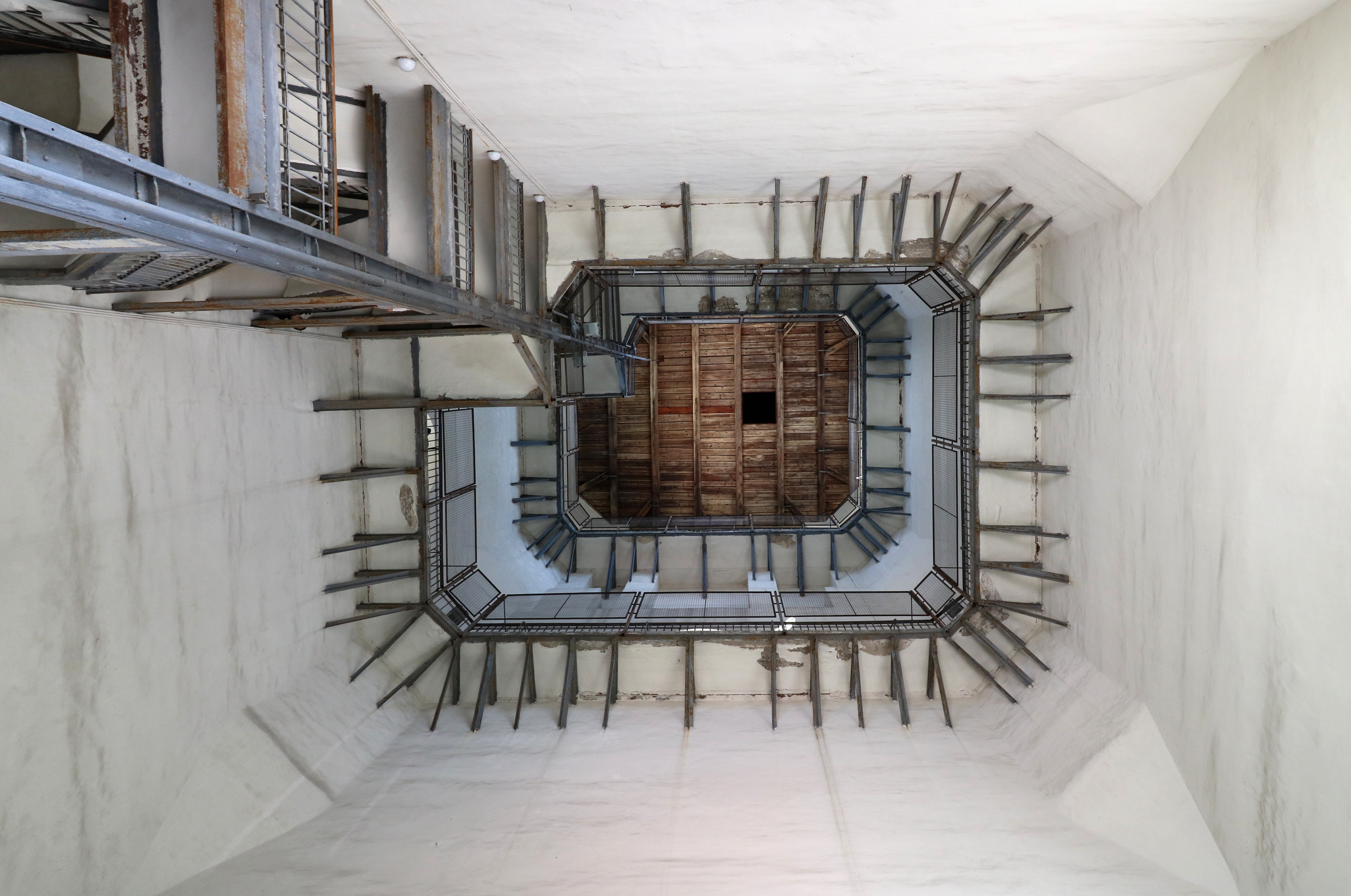
Interior of the bell tower, view of the third and fourth tiers from the second tier

In 1990, at the 14th session of the UNESCO World Heritage Committee, which was held in Banff, Alberta Canada, the bell tower was included in the World Heritage list as part of the complex of monastic structures of St. Sophia Cathedral under No. 527.

On 18 July 1995, under the walls of the bell tower, to the right of its gate on the side of Sophia Square, the Patriarch of Kyiv and All Rus-Ukraine (Ukrainian Orthodox Church – Kyiv Patriarchate) Volodymyr (Romaniuk) was buried. The funeral was accompanied by the beating, by the Ministry of Internal Affairs (police), of the funeral procession participants, who first wanted to bury the Patriarch on the territory of St. Sophia Cathedral.

The last restoration of the bell tower took place in 1997–2003 and cost about ₴6 million. During the restoration, the walls of the first tier were reinforced by injecting concrete, which was pumped under high pressure through holes in the facade walls. Due to the fact that the solution began to pour out directly from the arches of the internal premises, the work was not fully completed. In addition, the cross and gilding of the dome were updated, the exterior walls and decor were restored.

After the restoration was completed, on 27 June 2003, for the first time in several decades, the bell tower was opened to visitors.

On 4 April 2015, as part of the opening of the festival "French Spring in Ukraine," a 3D light presentation "I dream" dedicated to Ukraine's struggle for its freedom was held on the walls of the bell tower and St. Sophia Cathedral. During the 20-minute lights show, mosaic light images showed important social events in Ukraine and symbols of the Revolution of Dignity.

== See also ==
- Saint Sophia Cathedral, Kyiv
- The bell tower of St. Michael's Golden-Domed Monastery
- Great Lavra Bell Tower
- List of tallest Eastern Orthodox church buildings
- List of the tallest buildings in Kyiv
- List of churches dedicated to Holy Wisdom
- Hey, Hey, Rise Up!
