= KLOV =

KLOV may refer to:

== Geography ==
- Klov, an historical neighbourhood in the Ukrainian capital Kyiv

== Art, entertainment, and media ==
- Killer List of Videogames, a website devoted to cataloging videogames
- KLOV (FM), a radio station (89.3 FM) licensed to Winchester, Oregon, United States
- K-LOVE, a Christian Radio network in the United States
