= Stepan Kovnir =

Ukrainian architect (1695–1786)

- Степан Ковнір
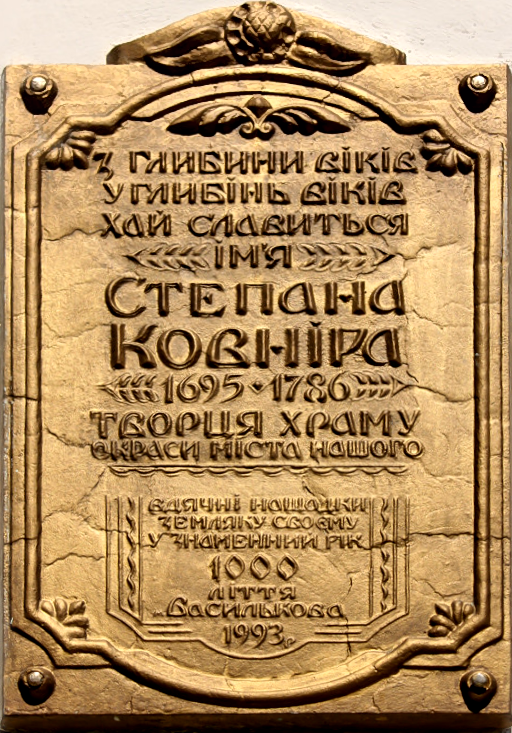
- Memorial plaque to Stepan Kovnir on the exterior of the Church of St. Anthony and St. Theodosius, Vasylkiv, Ukraine
- Born: Stepan Demianovych Kovnir; 1695; Hvozdiv, Cossack Hetmanate, Tsardom of Russia
- Died: 1786 (aged 90–91); Kyiv, Russian Empire
- Citizenship: Cossack Hetmanate; Russian Empire
- Occupations: Master builder; architect
- Years active: 1721–1777
- Buildings: Trinity Church, Kytayiv; Church of St. Anthony and St. Theodosius, Vasylkiv; St Andrew's Church, Kyiv; Kyiv Bratsky Monastery bell tower
- Projects: Kyiv Pechersk Lavra complex: Kovnir's Building; Bell tower of the Far Caves; Bell tower of the Near Caves; Great Bell Tower; Assumption Cathedral, pediments; Klov Palace
- Design: Ukrainian Baroque

Stepan Demianovych Kovnir (Ukrainian: Степан Дем'янович Ковнір [steˈpɑn deˈmjɑnowɪtʃ kou̯ˈn⁽ʲ⁾ir]; Russian: Степан Демьянович Ковнир; 1695–1786) was a Ukrainian builder and master mason in Kyiv. His nearly sixty years of labor brought aesthetic unity to the ancient, sprawling center of Ukrainian culture and education, the Kyiv Pechersk Lavra, which is now a UNESCO World Heritage Site. A serf without any formal education, he became an early master of Ukrainian baroque architecture as well as organizing a school for masons.

== Birth and background ==
Stepan Kovnir was born in 1695 in Hvozdiv, a village on Ros River south of Kyiv, owned by St. Michael's Hermitage, a wealthy monastery in the Kyiv sotnia of the Kyiv Regiment in the Cossack Hetmanate established by Bohdan Khmelnytsky. Today the village is in the Feodosiivska rural hromada of the Obukhiv Raion in Kyiv Oblast. The family he was born into were poor peasants who had come there after the destruction of Hvozdiv which had completely depopulated the village. Although peasants the family were not serfs, so he was not bound to the hermitage, and after his parents died he was able to travel to Kyiv in 1718.

== Kovnir, the builder ==
Bell Tower of the Far Caves, stucco motifs

Kyiv Pechersk monastery, one of the primary centers of eastern Slavic religion and culture for centuries, suffered a devastating fire on April 22, 1718 which destroyed most of the buildings in the monastic compound. Rebuilding did not begin until 1721. For some unknown reason Kovnir entered into serfdom under that very wealthy Lavra and served it for nearly the next six decades. Monastic duties were not required of him however. Instead he joined brick masons H. Teslenko and Iosyf Rubashevsky and engineers S. Chelakayev and N. Vladimirov in the rebuilding efforts. He learned the trade under his first teacher, Moscow architect Ivan Kalandin, beginning with humble projects: warehouses, storerooms, a bakery and a locksmith's shop. Over the succeeding decades he would work and rework these buildings following repeated fires from 1727 to 1773, incorporating folk motifs into the structure and stucco facings.

Eventually the largest one came to be called Kovnir's Building in honor of his efforts there to develop the Ukrainian baroque architectural style that celebrates the region's ancient, distinct culture. That building, built immediately northeast of the monastery's cathedral, began as a bakery and Kovnir festooned its gables with lush swags of botanical motifs. Later, a print shop was added to the north side of the bakery. Kovnir relied more on classic columns and far less on plant elements in the gables of this extension. But he gave the assemblage a unified facade that makes it appear as a single building with six gables. In 1729 he collaborated with Yuriy Belinsky to create the volutes, pediments and gold disks for the roof of the Lavra's Assumption Cathedral; the cathedral was reduced to rubble either by the German army or by retreating Soviets during World War II and the restored pediments are not faithful reproductions.

Kovnir deepened his skills from 1741 to 1745 when Gottfried Johann Schädel consulted with him to replace the Lavra's old, wooden bell tower with the Great Bell Tower, built of brick, stucco and ceramic in a classical style. The top three tiers of the 4-story structure have Doric, Ionic and Corinthian columns, successively. The capitals of the columns are cast ceramic and no two of the Corinthian capitals, with their lush acanthus leaves, are alike. In contributing to all of this, Kovnir was developing a very high level of ability. In 1749 he participated in the construction of St. Andrew's church, Kyiv, working under Ivan Michurin on a European baroque design by Francesco Bartolomeo Rastrelli. In subsequent decades, he would also work with engineers Daniel de Bosquet, S. Chelakayev and N. Vladimirov, and architects Pyotr Neelov, F. Vasiliev and Ivan Hryhorovych-Barskyi.

Kovnir's career moved from strength to strength as his name became widely known. From 1754 to 1761 he fulfilled his dream to supervise construction of a sobor and belfry in the town of Vasylkiv, just a few miles from the village of his birth: the Church of St. Anthony and St. Theodosius. With its curved, tipped gables and molded, square Corinthian half-columns supporting a double cornice under its roof, it resembles the Cathedral of the Nativity of the Blessed Virgin in Kozelets. The Kozelets cathedral was built in the Chernihiv region during the same period this Vasylkiv sobor was built in the Kyiv region and Hryhorovych-Barskyi was the cathedral's architect. However, the Vasylkiv church forgoes the cathedral's mock Roman pediments above each window in favor of curving volute ornaments. Its ground floor windows are larger and the church's overall proportions are more harmonious. It bears a memorial plaque expressing the gratitude of the community for the building of the church.

In 1755 Kovnir finished Klov Palace, a hostelry intended for noble and royal guests of Pechersk Lavra and which had been begun by Neelov. For this he was released from serfdom, became a master mason, was made a burgher and given a manor south of Pechersk, in what is now the Holosiivskyi district. This allowed him to enter into a contract on his own behalf with Manasiy Maksymovich, the rector of Podil's Kyiv-Mohyla Academy and archimandrite of its neighboring Kyiv Bratsky Monastery, to erect the bell tower of that monastery in 1756. The tower was square, three stories high and topped with a baroque dome and cross. Its style, visible in architectural plans still in existence, indicates the architect could have been Hryhorovych-Barsky. The delineation between the stories was subtle and the bottom story was an arched gateway, flanked with staircases. It dominated Podil's visual landscape as the main gate between the ecclesiastic compound and the area's main market to its west until it burned down in the Great Podil Fire in 1811.

In 1757 he built a book bindery south of Kovnir's Building and east of Assumption Cathedral. From 1754 to 1761 Kovnir supervised the building of the bell tower for the Church of the Nativity of the Theotokos in the Far Caves at the Pechersk Lavra, based on sketches by Hryhorovych-Barsky. Built mostly after his release from serfdom, this has been called his masterpiece for the delicate and innovative plaster motifs Kovnir used above the archivolt of the first tier and above the arches of the second. They combine the roses and trefoils of baroque aesthetic with the delicacy of rococo, all while expressing this using motifs from traditional Ukrainian embroidery. Kovnir finished the final major architectural element at the Pechersk Lavra when he erected the bell tower for the Church of the Annunciation at the Near Caves in 1759 to 1763, thus bringing aesthetic unity to the monastic complex. In 1767 he completed building Trinity Church for the hermitage in Kytayiv, ornamented with Ukrainian baroque motifs in stucco. After Charles de Chardone added a second story to the book bindery Kovnir had built in 1757, changing its architectural style from Ukrainian baroque to renaissance, Kovnir built a second one from 1772 to 1773.

== Kovnir, the man ==
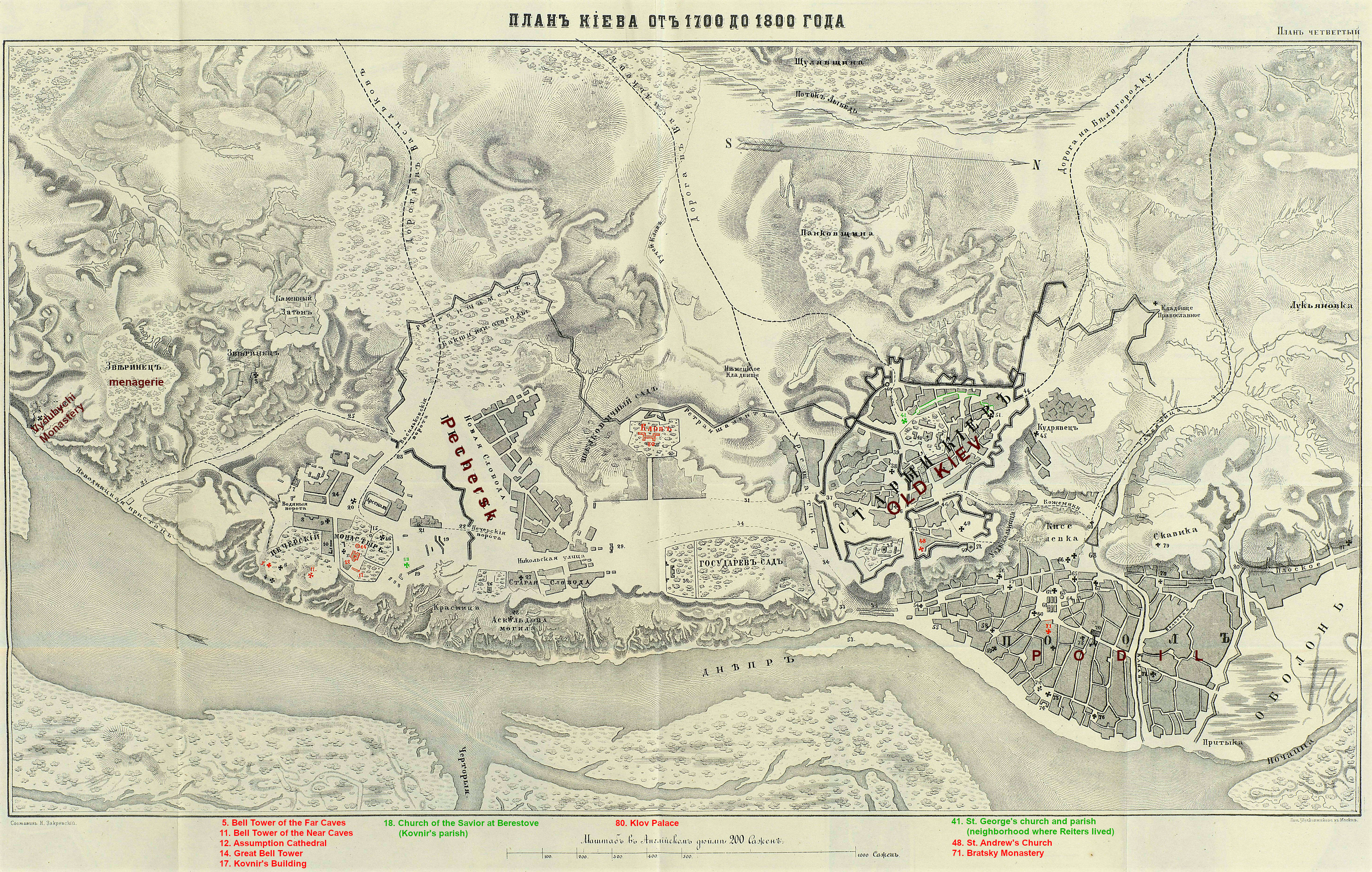
Locations related to Kovnir. North is to the right, south to the left.

Kovnir was bound to Kyiv Pechersk Lavra which had great independence from the civil and political control of either Pechersk or Kyiv. There is a story that, having learned that the mayor of Pechersk was selling favors and influence, he executed his own form of swift and decisive justice right where the activity was occurring. The mayor later complained, "Kovnir threw off his wolfskin coat, grabbed me by the hair, and bending me almost to the ground, punched me mercilessly in the face. If everyone had not dispersed, he would have beaten me even more."

Kovnir had two sons, Vasyl and Matvyi, with his wife Yevdokia Ivanovna. His children's surname was Kryshtalevsky (Кришталевські), indicating that this was his own surname at birth and it had been changed to Kovnir when he became a serf. The family lived in the Pechersk parish of the Church of the Saviour at Berestove, immediately north of the Lavra and part of its world heritage site. He was a founding patron of that church and his portrait would have been on the wall there, perhaps in fresco. As a patron he engaged in community activities to benefit his parishioners, most of whom were military. The relationships and network he built there are reflected in the fact that his son Vasyl became a warrant officer in the Kyiv Reiter Command, an exclusive military unit with high social prestige. Literacy was a requirement for membership, indicating that Kovnir had been able to educate his children. The way Vasyl was mentioned in the reiters' muster roll of 1772 indicates that he wasn't from a military, noble, clerical, peasant or laborer family. He was referred to as "Malorusian," the Russian term for Ukrainians, but his social class is not mentioned. Vasyl married Tatyana Efremivna, with whom he had a daughter named Iryna Vasylivna Kryshtalevska. She went on to marry Serhii Frolovych Zhukov, a lieutenant of the 2nd Battalion. The Zhukovs were a family with a dedades-long tradition of reiter service. Kovnir's other son, Matvyi, married Kateryna Timofievna. Kovnir had more interests than just building. Lavra architect Z. Valkevich was the landlord of a market in Podil, the commercial hub of the area, and Kovnir rented shops number 56 and 68 from him in the 1760s. He had a third shop in Bellman's Row in addition to a butcher shop. At some point Kovnir also organized a school for masons. At his death in 1786 he owned other property as well. When Vasyl's widow died in 1792, her will left their daughter Iryna the "Kovnir's courtyard with all the choirs, lying in the Kyiv-Pechersk fortress, not far from the market."

== Kovnir's memory after his death ==
During the one hundred and sixty-eight years of Russian rule of Ukraine following Kovnir's death, when it suppressed Kyiv Pechersk Lavra and Ukrainian language, culture and identity, he was forgotten. Russian and Soviet authorities did not consider Ukrainian baroque architecture to be worth remembering, much less preserving. Information about his life was rediscovered by B. A. Krytsky and published in his 1954 Ph.D. thesis, Народные мастера архитектуры XVIII века на Украине: Степан Ковнир: Архитектурно-строительная деятельность (People's masters of architecture in 18th century Ukraine: Stepan Kovnir: Architectural and construction activity).

Kovnir's creations were admired by Merited Architect of Ukraine, Professor Yuri Aseev, who wrote: "Kovner did for the Lavra what Sansovino did for St. Mark's Square in Venice - he completed the historical process of assembling a harmonious architectural complex."

In Vasylkiv, the exterior wall of the Church of Saint Anthony and St.Theodosius bears a gold-painted plaque that reads,

From the depths of eternity
to deepest eternity
glory be to the name
of
Stepan Kovnir
1695 - 1786
Builder of this church
The beauty of our city
From his grateful friends
His countrymen
In the significant year of the
thousandth anniversary
of the founding of Vasylkiv.
1993

== Gallery ==
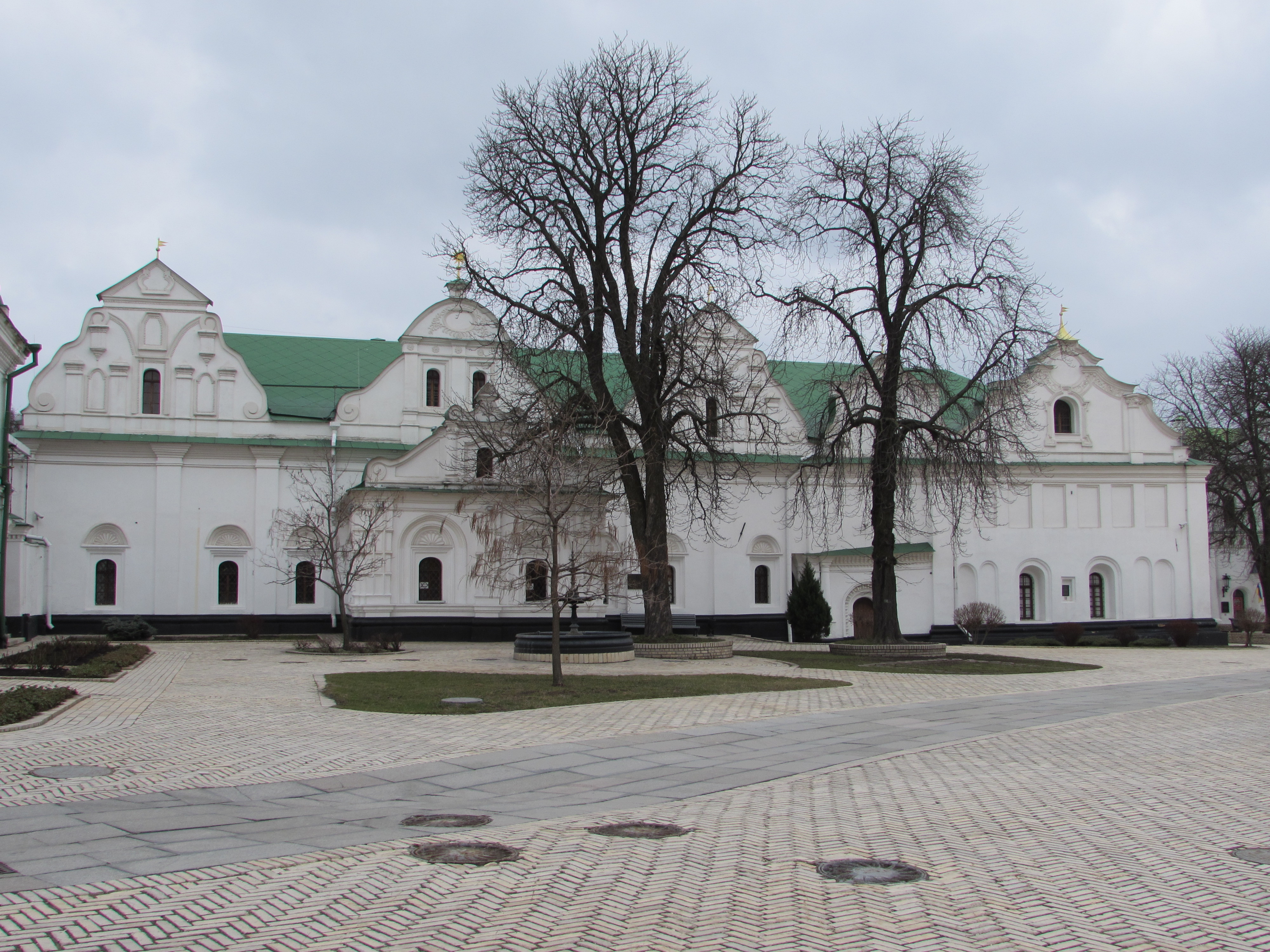
50.4356°N 30.5577°E
Kovnir's Building, Pechersk. (1721–73). Note the stucco work in the gables.

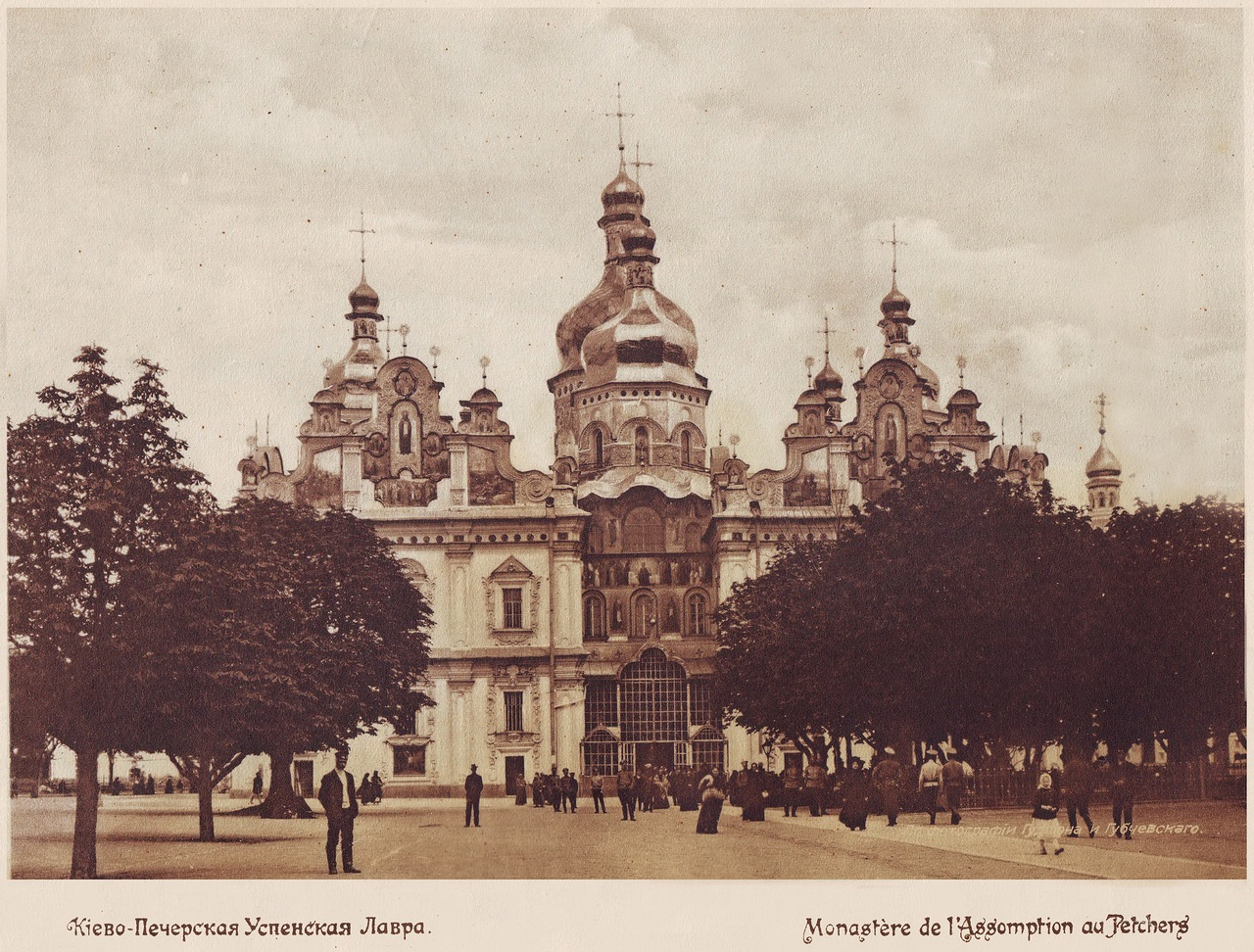
Pediments, Assumption Cathedral, Pechersk (1729). Kovnir's work, shown here, was destroyed by the German military during World War II and not faithfully reproduced.

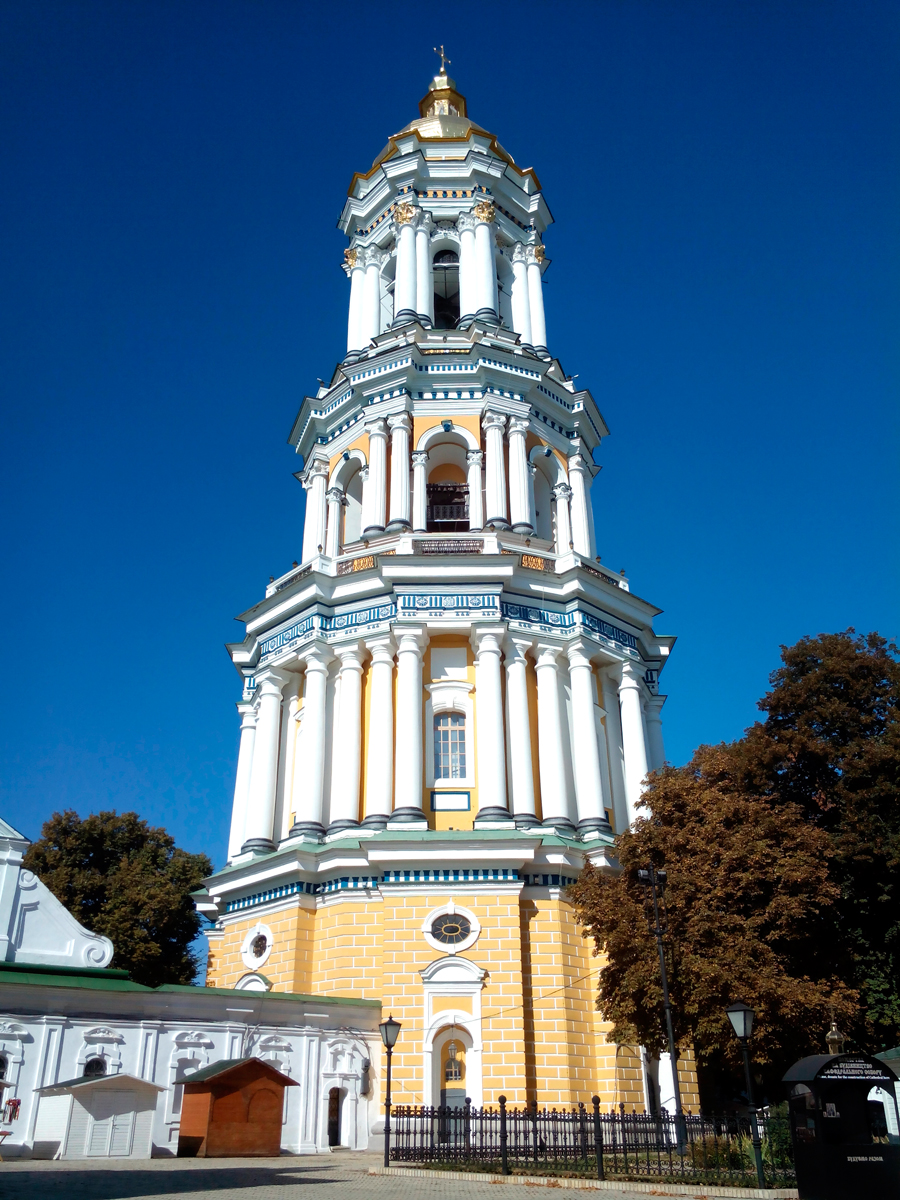
50.4347°N 30.5563°E
Great Bell Tower, Pechersk. (1731–45). Note the capitals of the Corinthian columns. They are cast ceramic and each is unique.

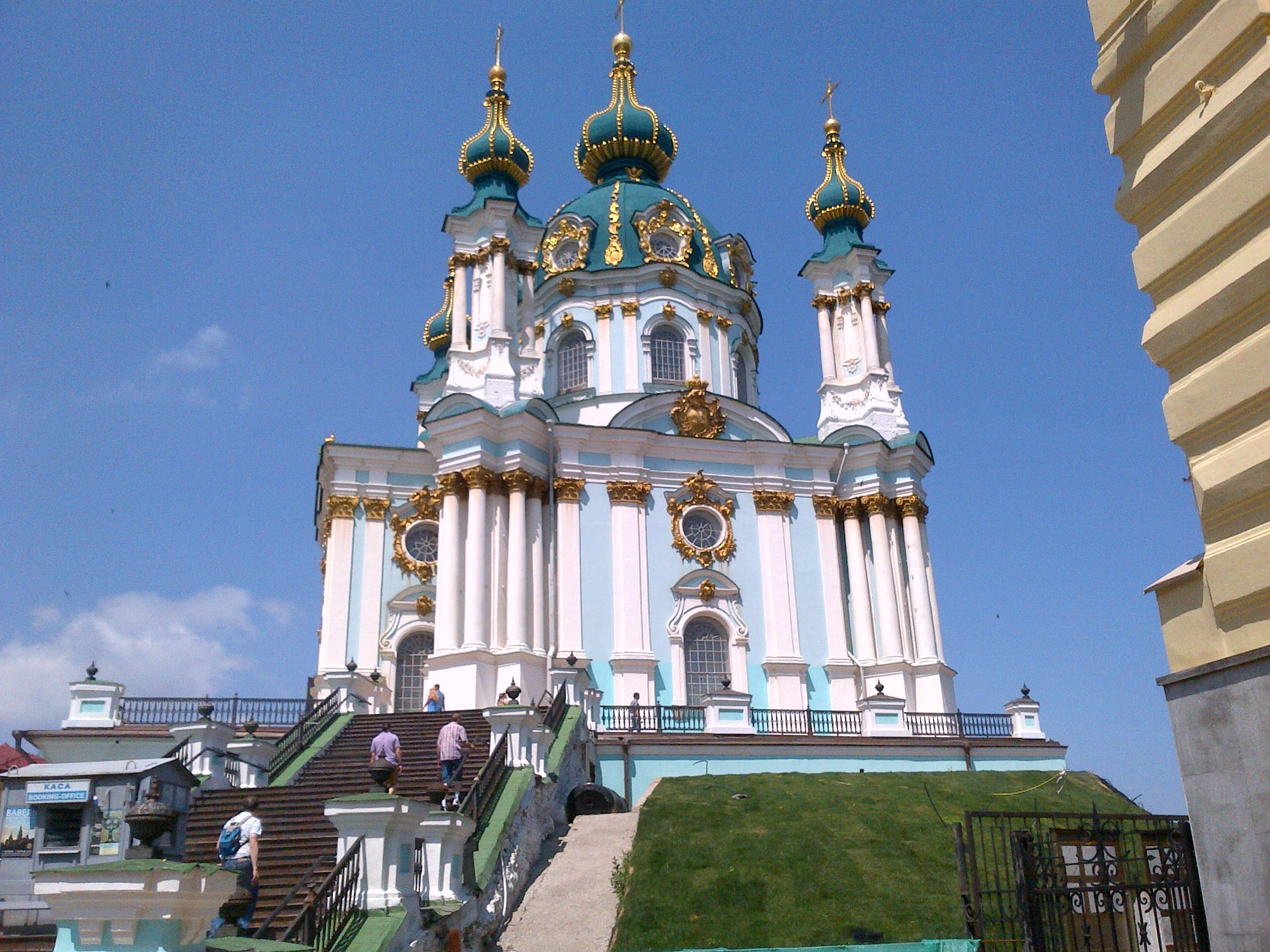
50.4588°N 30.5180°E
St. Andrews Church, Kyiv (1747-1754).

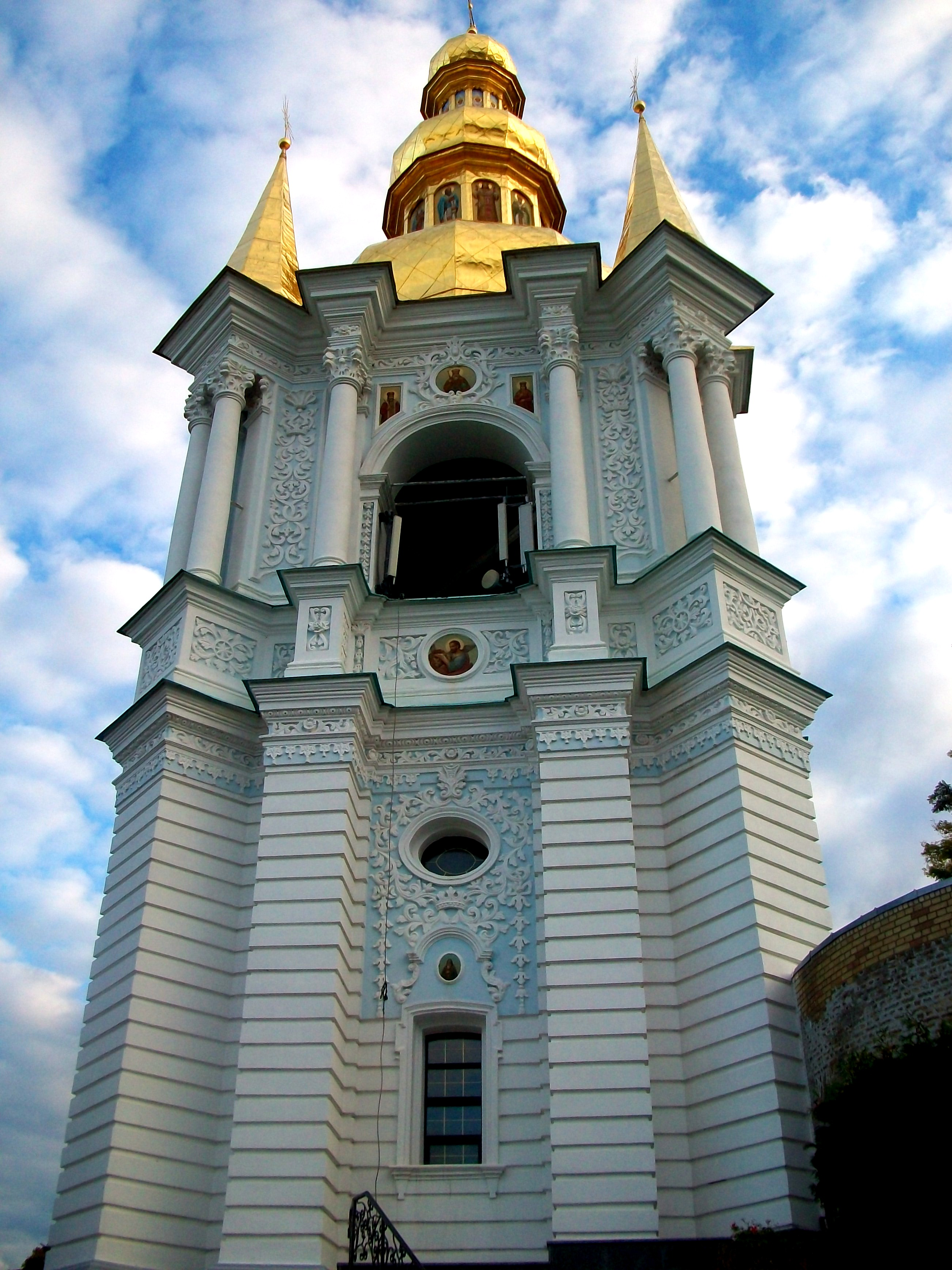
50.4319°N 30.5622°E
Bell tower at the Far Caves, Pechersk. (1754–61). Note the fine stucco work above the door and on the second level.

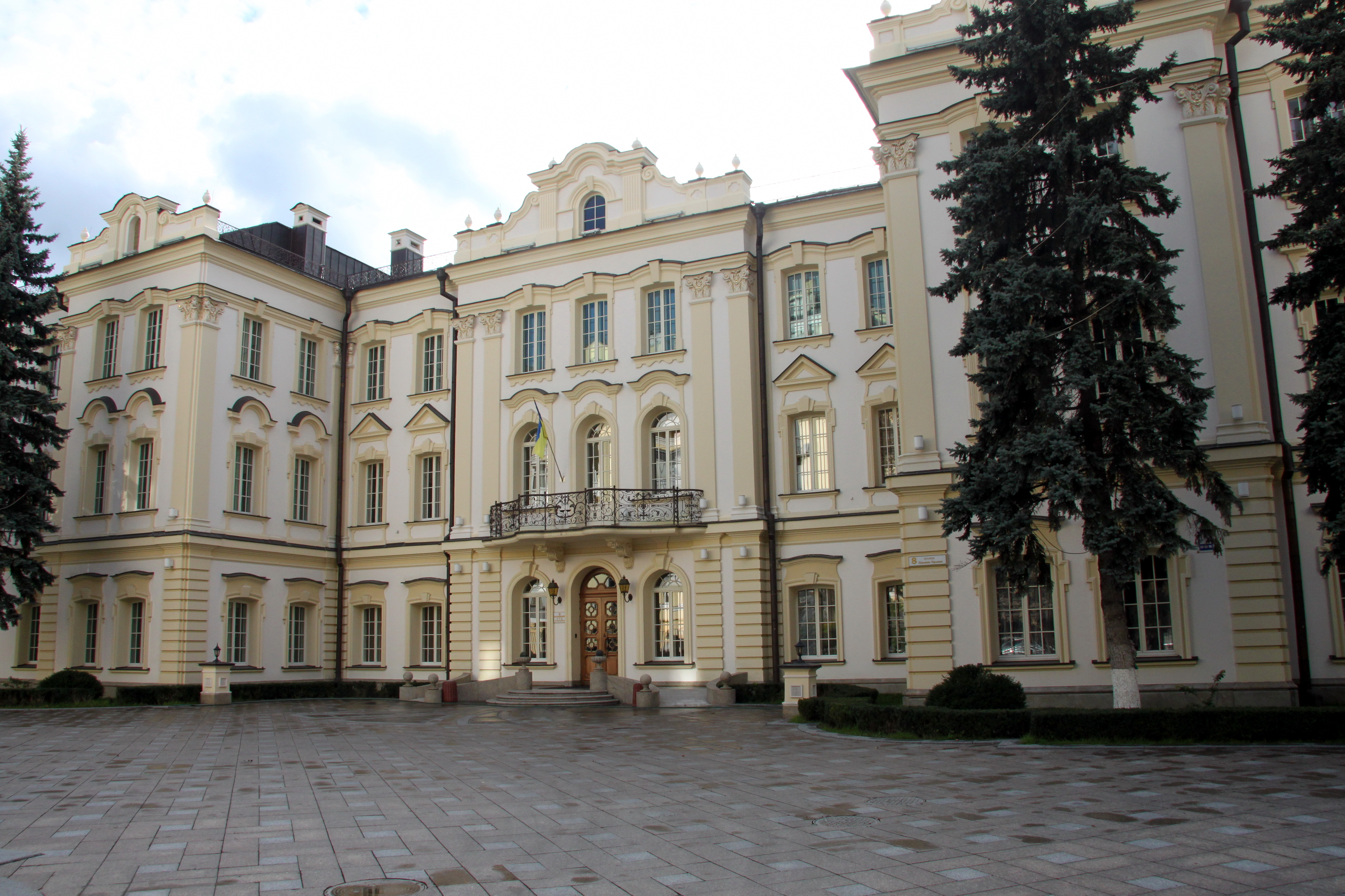
50.4421°N 30.5326°E
Klov Palace, Kyiv (1754–61).

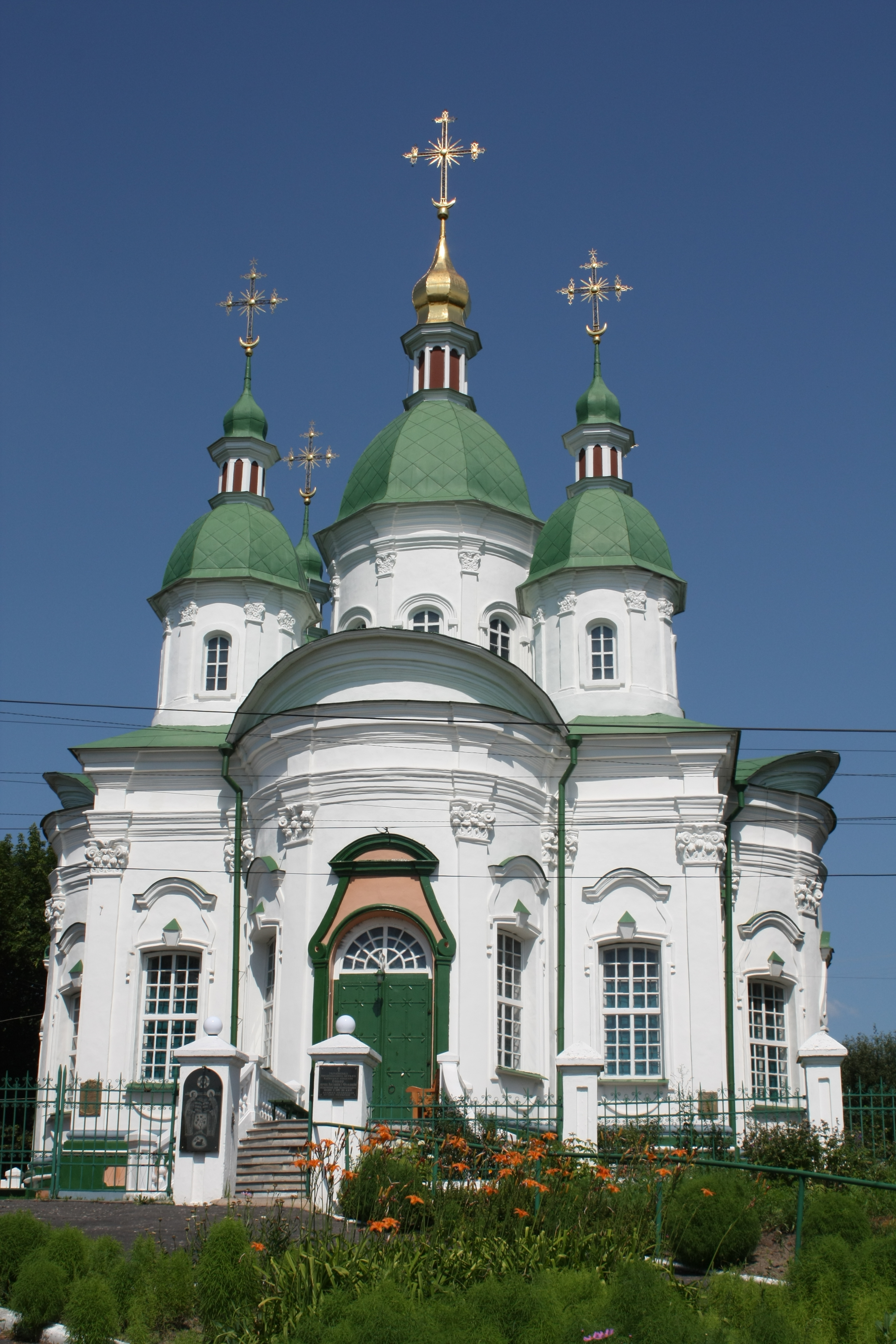
50.1803°N 30.3205°E
Sobor of Anthony and Theodosius, Vasylkiv. (1756–58). Note the capitals of the columns.

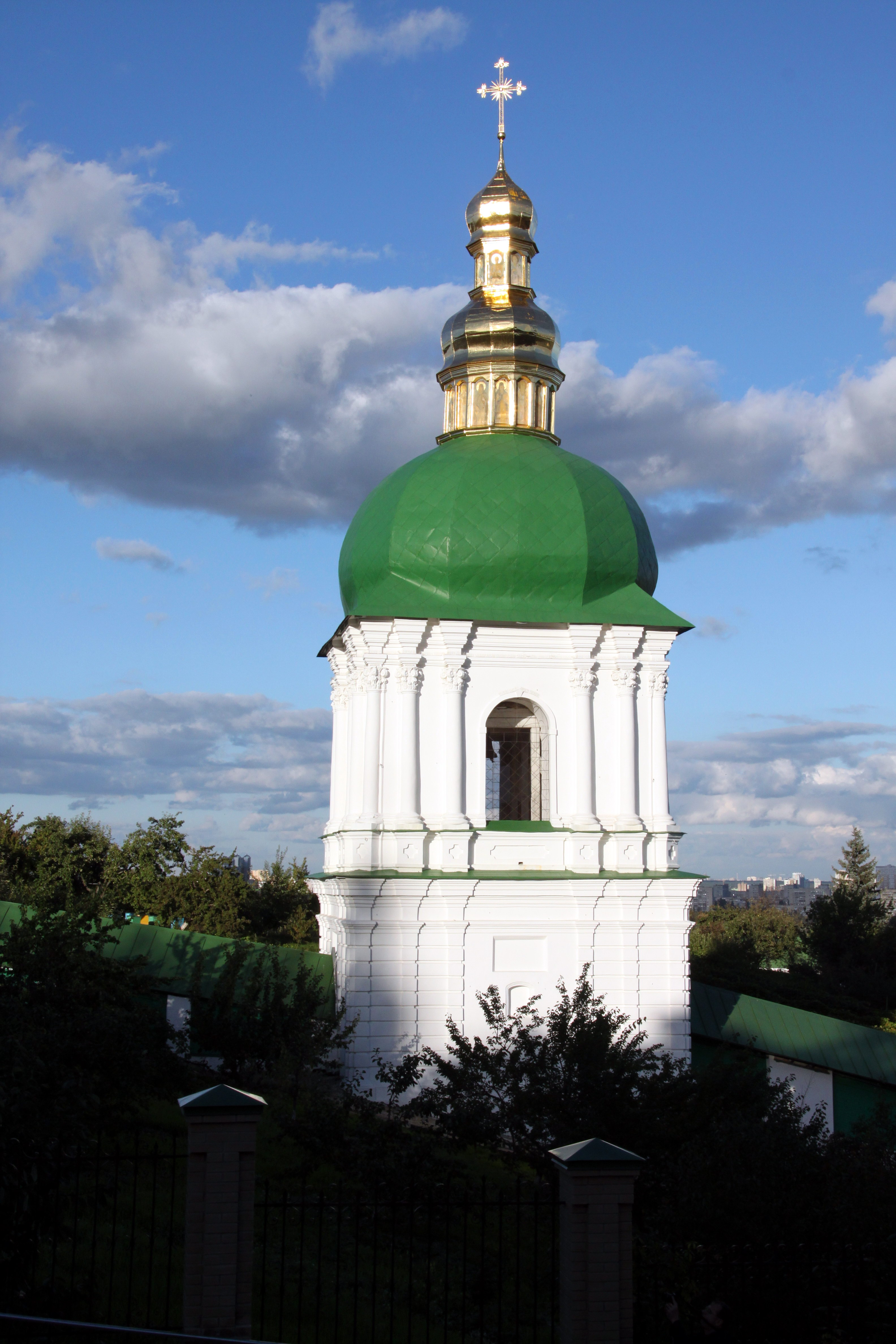
50.4339°N 30.5601°E
Bell Tower of the Near Caves, Pechersk. (1759–62).

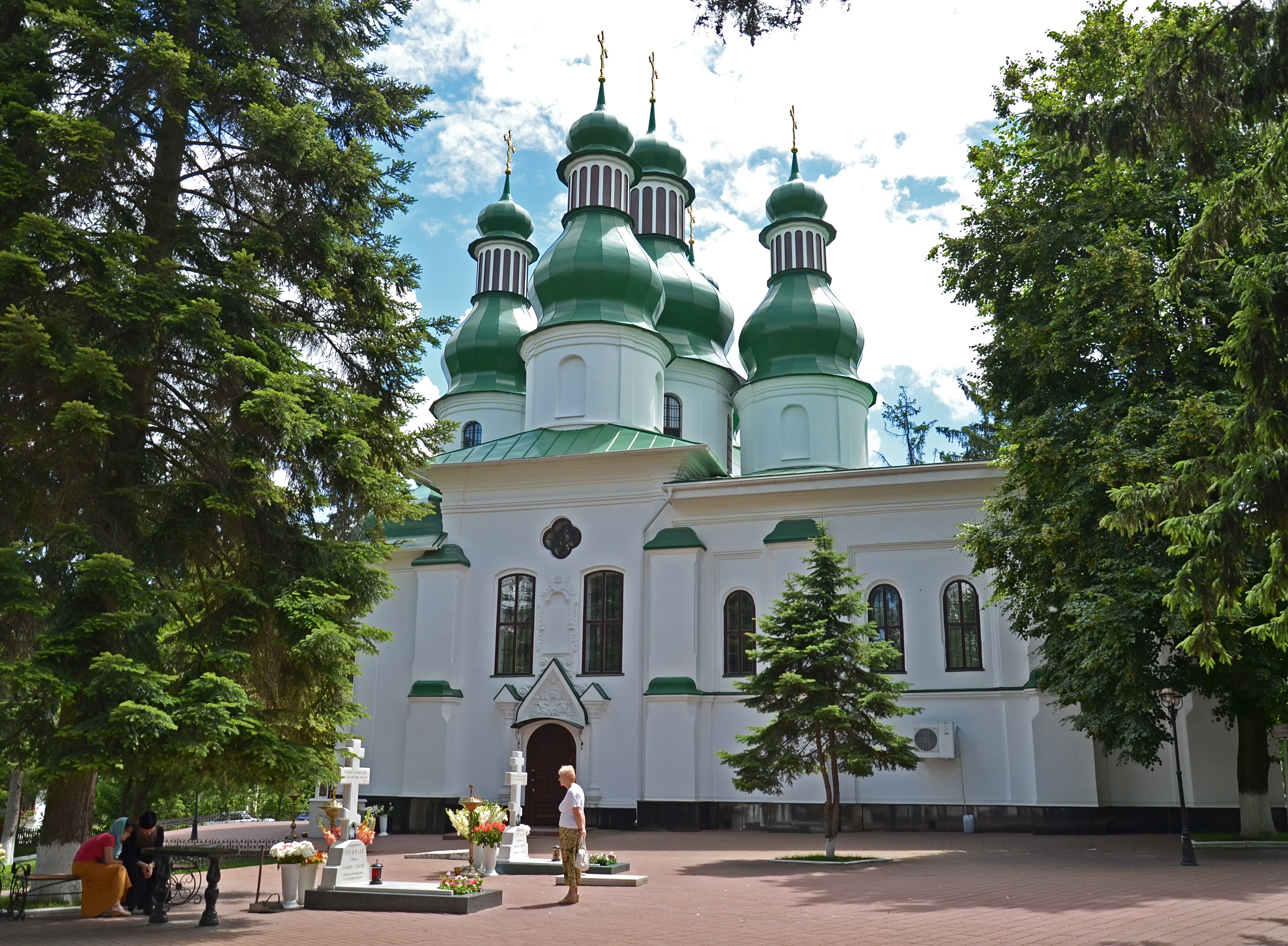
50.3668°N 30.5422°E
Holy Trinity hermitage church, Kytayiv. (1763–67). Note the stucco work above the door.

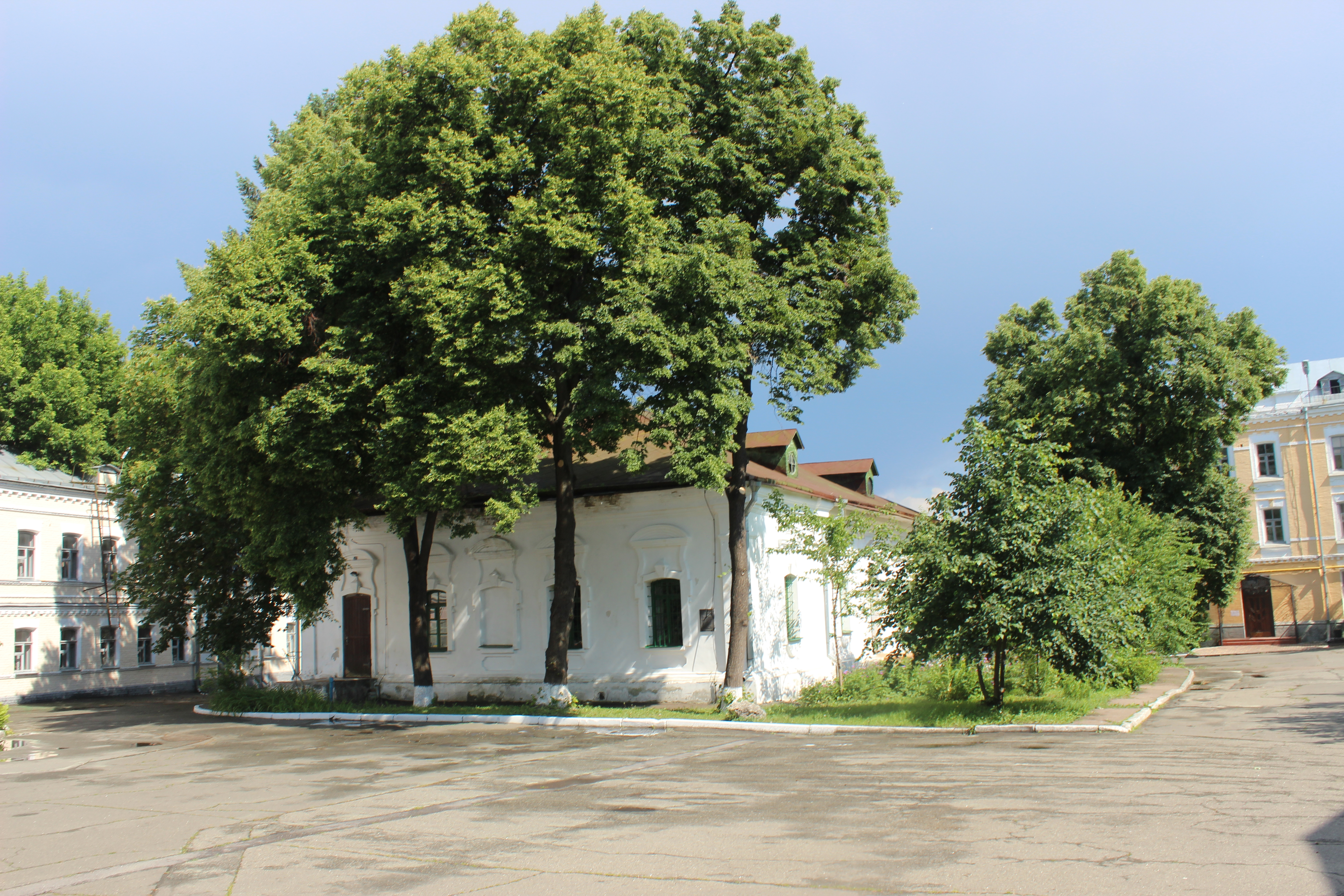
50.4361°N 30.5576°E
The second book bindery, Pechersk. (1772–73).

== See also ==
Kyivan Cave Monastery (Internet Encyclopedia of Ukraine)
