= Klov Palace =

Palace in Ukraine

- Кловський палац
- The Klov Palace, home to the Supreme Court of Ukraine

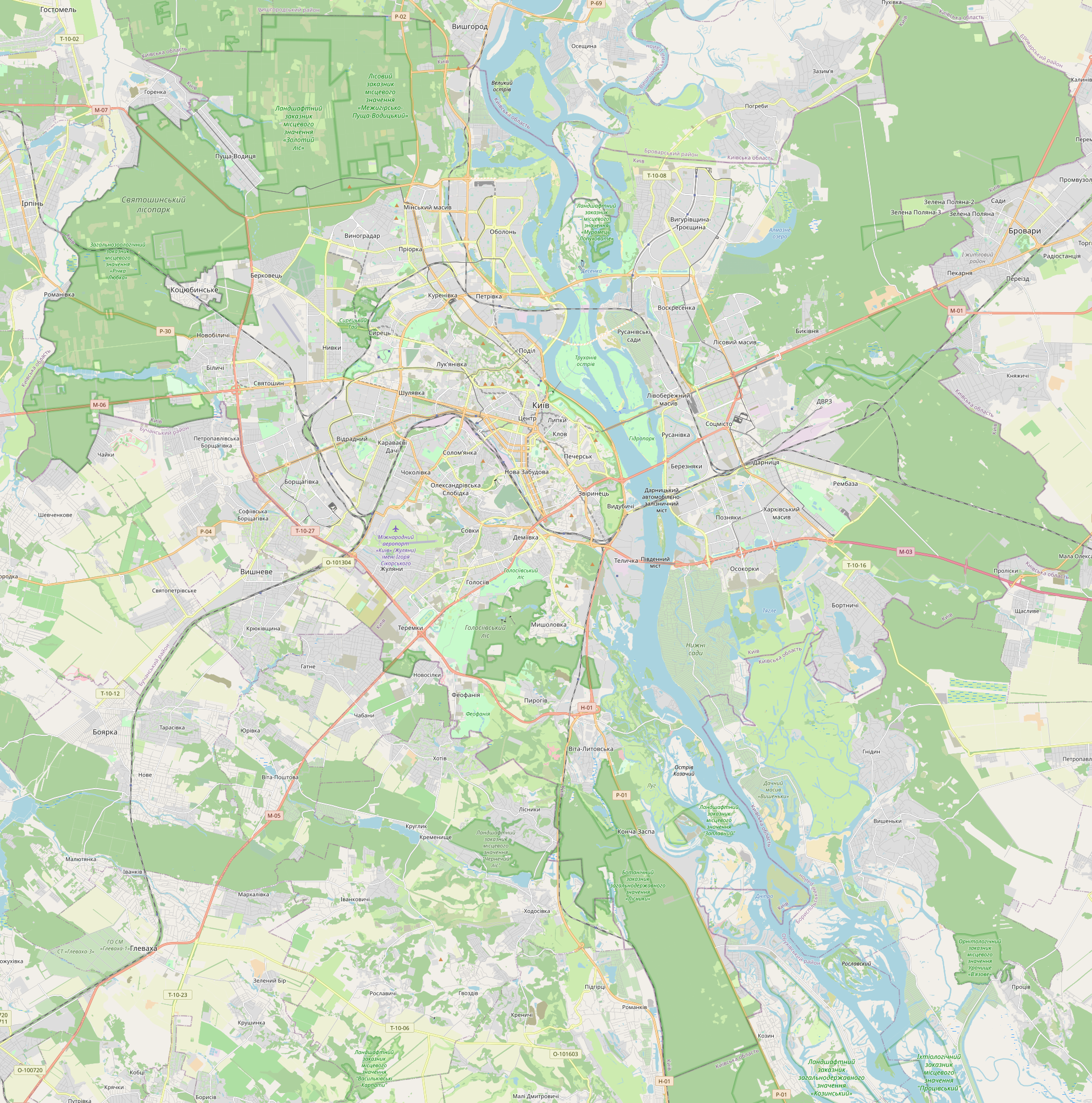
- Location within Kyiv Klov Palace (Ukraine)

General information
- Architectural style: Baroque
- Location: 8 Pylypa Orlyka Street, Pecherskyi District, Kyiv, Ukraine
- Coordinates: 50°26′31.7″N 30°31′57.5″E
- Construction started: 1753
- Completed: 1761
- Client: Kyiv Pechersk Lavra

Design and construction
- Architect: Petr Neelov

Immovable Monument of National Significance of Ukraine
- Official name: Кловський палац (Klov Palace)
- Type: Architecture
- Reference no.: 260133

The Klov Palace (Ukrainian: Кловський палац, romanized: Klovskyi palats) is the seat of the Supreme Court of Ukraine in Kyiv. The building takes its name from Klov, a neighbourhood of Pecherskyi District.

The Baroque residence was constructed between 1752 and 1756 with funds provided by Kyiv Pechersk Lavra. The Russian royal family were expected to stay at the palace during their visits to the monastery, as they did in a wooden palace that had preceded it. The architects are thought to have been Gottfried Johann Schädel and Pyotr Neyelov. The actual construction was supervised by Stepan Kovnir. The main hall has the plafond frescoed in 1760. A formal garden was laid out around the palace.

The palace was never visited by any royalty, however, and it was not long before it fell into disrepair. Catherine II of Russia, who was passing through Kyiv in 1787, preferred Mariinskyi Palace for her residence. It was destroyed by a fire in 1858 and was rebuilt soon after with the addition of an upper story and the side wings. The palace burnt down in the aftermath of the Russian Revolution. A restoration process was undertaken in the 1970s.

== Occupants of the palace ==
- The publishing house of the Kyiv Pechersk Monastery (1760s)
- A military hospital (1770–1811)
- First Kyiv Gymnasium (1811–1857)
- The diocesan school for girls (late 19th century)
- The Ukrainian Museum of the Great Patriotic War (1974–81)
- The Kyiv History Museum (1980s and 1990s)
