= Raphael Zaborovsky =

Metropolitan of Kyiv (1743–1747)

Saint Raphael (Zaborovsky)
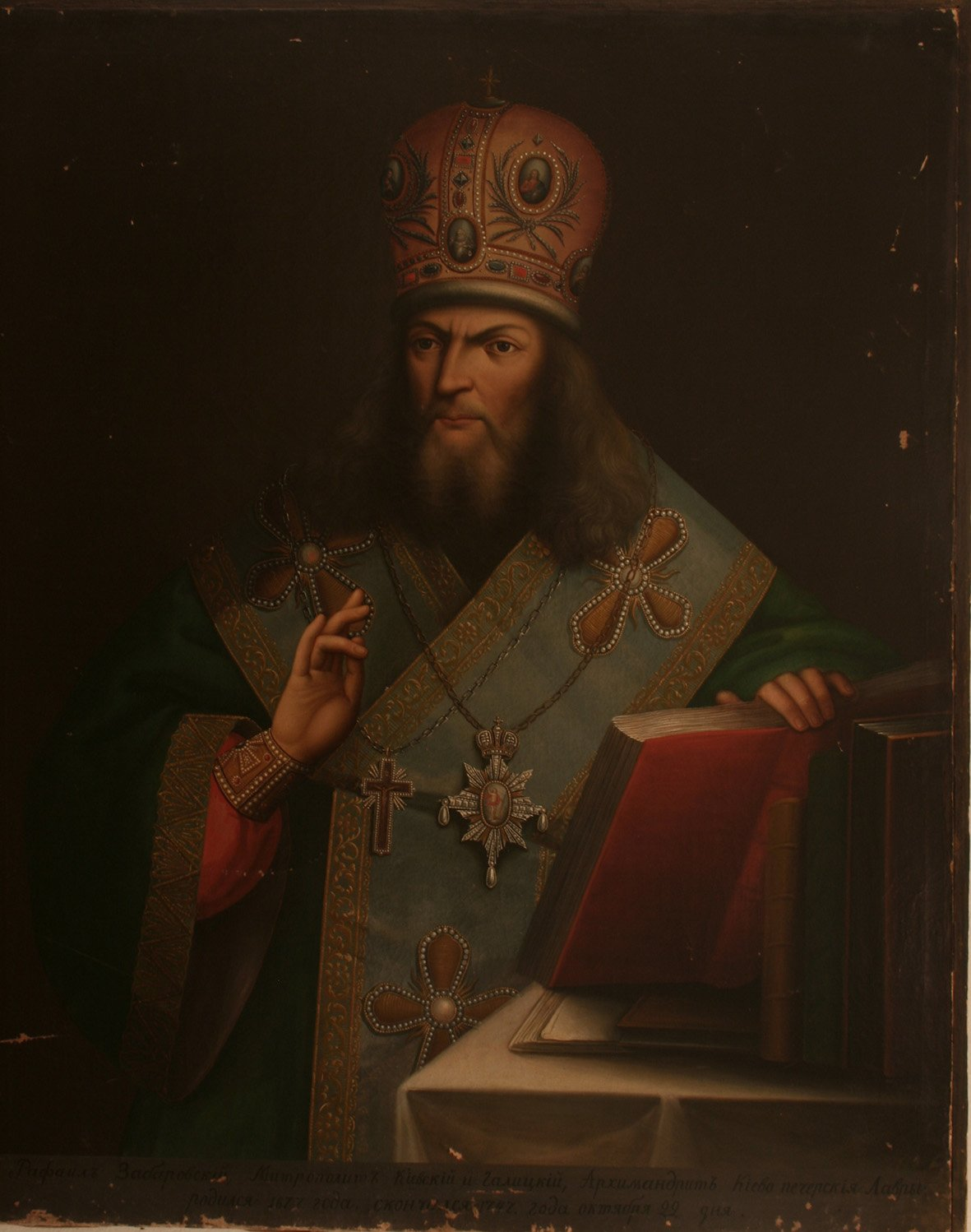
- Raphael Zaborovsky

Metropolitan of Kyiv, Galicia and all Little Rus'
- Born: 1677; Zboriv
- Died: October 22, 1747 (aged 69–70); Kyiv
- Venerated in: Orthodox Church of Ukraine
- Canonized: 28 March 2023
- Feast: 4 November

Raphael (Note: Ukrainian: Рафаїл, Russian: Рафаил) (secular name: Mykhailo Zaborovsky (Note: Ukrainian: Михайло Заборовський, Russian: Михаил Заборовский, Polish: Michał Zaborowski); 1677 – 22 October 1747) was the bishop of Pskov and Narva and the Metropolitan of Kiev in the Patriarchate of Moscow.

== Life ==
Zaborovsky was born in Zborów in the Ruthenian Voivodeship of the Polish–Lithuanian Commonwealth. He studied at the Kiev Academy and then at the Moscow Theological Academy, where he later taught rhetorics (1718). After serving as a chaplain in the Russian Navy, he became archimandrite of the Tver Monastery. In 1723, he became a member of the church's Holy Synod.

In 1725, he was consecrated bishop of Pskov. He was elevated to the office of archbishop of Kiev by the tsar in 1731. He later convinced the church authorities to restore the archeparchy of Kiev to metropolis status, whereupon he took the title of "Metropolitan of Kiev, Galicia and Little Russia" in 1743.

A supporter of Archbishop Theofan Prokopovich, Zaborovsky carried out the Russian government's policy of destroying the autonomy of the Ukrainian church by instituting the "Dukhovnyi reglament" of 1721 and other synodal ukases. He did, however, raise the academic standards and improve the economic standing of the Kyiv-Mohyla Academy. He published a new statute for the academy, reformed the curriculum (adding new courses in more modern disciplines), and provided much money for the expansion of the academy's buildings and for scholarships for poor students. The academy even briefly became known as the Mohyla-Zaborovsky Academy. The Great Bell Tower of the Kyiv Monastery of the Caves (1736–45), the bell tower of the Saint Sophia Cathedral, the baroque Zaborovsky Gate, and a number of other buildings were constructed during his tenure as metropolitan. He died in Kiev.

In March 2023 synod of the Orthodox Church of Ukraine canonized Zaborovsky, appointing his feast day for 4 November (O.S. 22 October), the anniversary of the metropolitan's death.

== Notes ==
Preceded by Barlaam Vanatovich	Metropolitan of Kiev, Galicia and Little Russia; 1731–1747	Succeeded by Timothy Shcherbatsky
