= Kytaiv =

Neighbourhood in Kyiv, Ukraine

Kytaiv Holy Trinity Monastery

Kytaiv (Ukrainian: Китаїв) is a neighbourhood located in the southern part of Kyiv. Known as the site of a historical settlement established during the times of Volodymyr I of Kyiv, in our days the area houses an archaeological monument of national importance. Pyrohiv neighbourhood with its National Museum of Folk Architecture and Folkways of Ukraine is located nearby.

== History ==
The area of Kytaiv was settled already during the times of Trypillian culture and in the Scythian age. Under the rule of prince Volodymyr, a fortified complex was built there. Historian Mykhailo Maksymovych and archaeologist Ivan Movchan identified the fortification with the city of Peresichen (Ukrainian: Пересічень) mentioned in Rus' chronicles. Along with Vyshhorod, Bilhorod and Vasyliv, it served as an important defensive point on the outskirts of Kyiv.

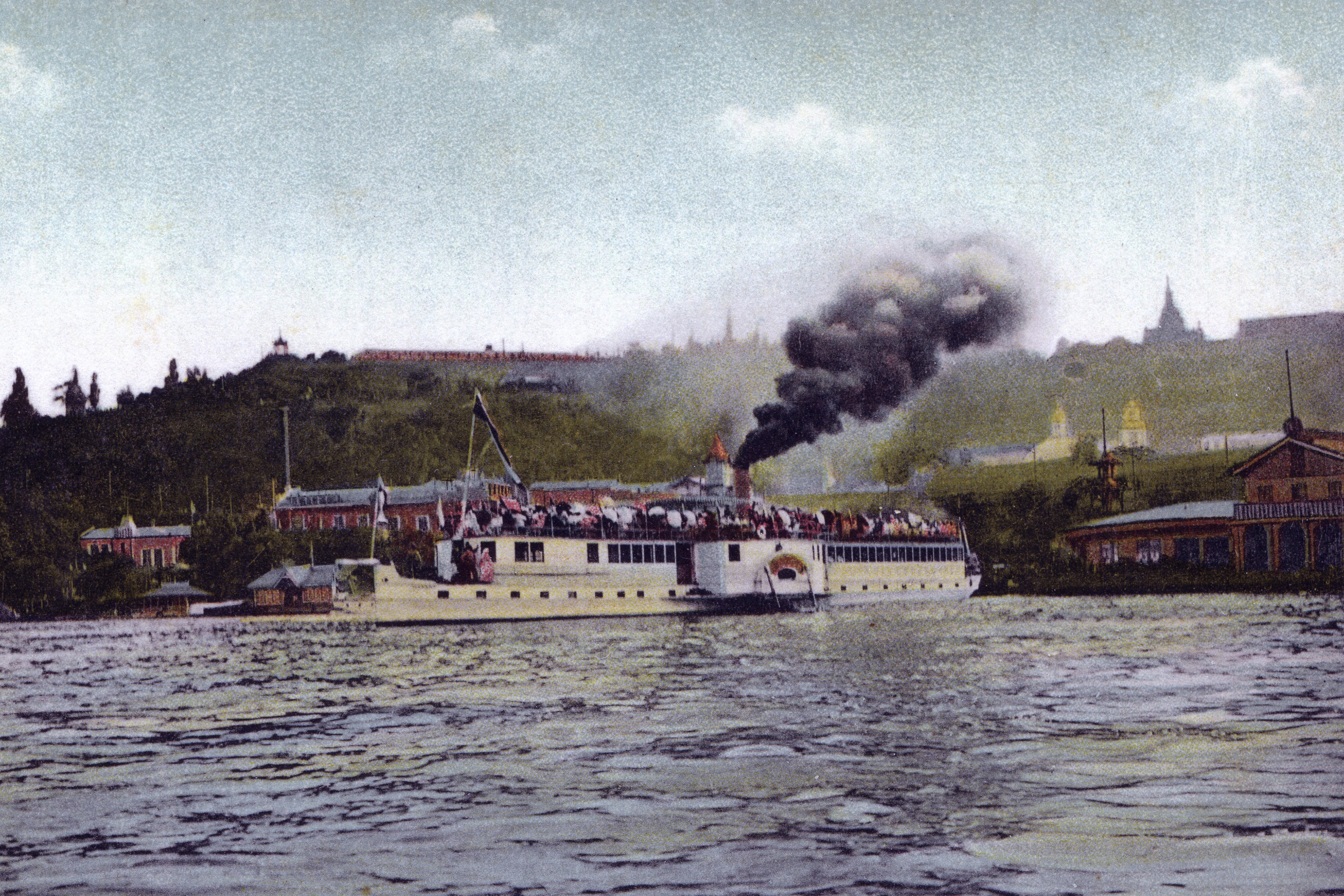
A steamboat to Kytaiv, 1913

According to church tradition, a skete was established in Kytaiv by monks of the Kyiv Pechersk Lavra in the 16th or 17th century. In 1716, a wooden church dedicated to Sergius of Radonezh was erected there with financial support of prince Dmitry Golitsyn. In 1767 it was replaced with the stone Church of the Holy Trinity, whose construction was directed by Stepan Kovnir. In 1786 the Kytaiv Monastery of the Holy Trinity, which emerged in the area was officially subjected to the Kyiv Monastery of the Caves, and during the following decades it served as an agricultural estate and a place of retirement for elderly monks.

The Lavra's candle factory was established in Kytaiv, and two additional churches were constructed during the 19th and early 20th centuries. Following the establishment of Soviet rule, the monastery was disbanded, and in 1932 its belfry was demolished. The remaining complex was used for scientific purposes such as agricultural studies. During the early 1990s the Holy Trinity Church was restored and transferred to the Ukrainian Orthodox Church (Moscow Patriarchate). In 1994 monks returned to Kytaiv, and in 1996 the male monastery was officially reestablished.

== Archaeological site ==
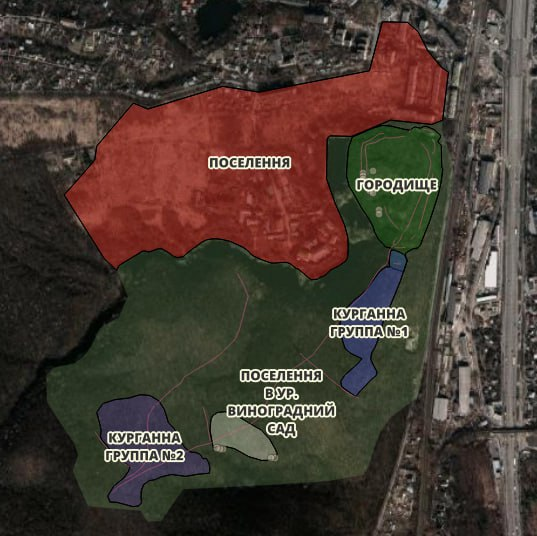
A map of Kytaiv archaeological complex, with the fortification in green, nearby settlement in red and burial sites in blue

Archaeological excavations in Kytaiv started in 1874 under the leadership of Dmytro Samokvasov. Later the site was studied by Volodymyr Antonovych, Vikentiy Khvoyka, Mykola Biliashivskyi and Natalia Polonska-Vasylenko. In 1896, a local peasant discovered a treasure trove containing 11 silver grivnas and 21 belt decorations made of silver. Dated from the late 11th-early 12th century, the trove stemmed from Iran or Central Asia. In 1914 a topographic description of the Kytaiv fortification was published.

Constructed of earth and wood, the fortification was located over the Dnieper river and was centered around Kytai-hora, a hill reaching the height of 170 meters above sea level. It consisted of three concentric walls, several trenches and five fortified grounds. An additional fortification on the northern side provided access to a nearby stream. Further excavations during the late 1940s discovered a settlement with remains of earlier fortifications located below the main fortified complex. Traces of metallurgy production, as well as numerous seals, amphoras, dice, weapons and elements of jewellery were discovered on the site.

The total area of the historical settlement comprised 40 hectares. Additionally, a bural complex with numerous kurgans, cremation sites and cenotaphs have been unearthed in Kytaiv, however many of them have been robbed. Additionally, remains of a cave monastery are located in the territory.

== Modern condition ==
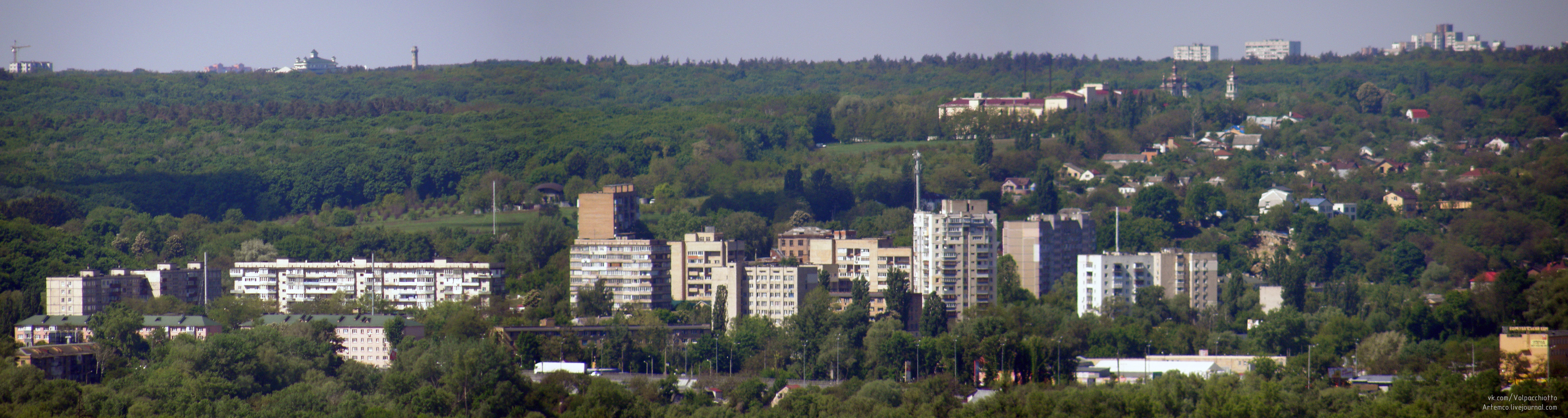
A modern view of Kytaiv residential area

Several parts of the original fortifications in Kytaiv have been preserved to our day. Today the territory is covered with oak and hornbeam forests. In 1986 the archaeological sites, including fortified locations and burials, were officially registered as an important monument. However, starting from the late 1980s residential construction started to threaten the area, and only the intervention of academician Petro Tronko saved the site from possible destruction. In 2004 two plots of land near the archaeological monument were allocated to a private company for agricultural use according to a decision by Kyiv City Council, violating its status as a protected area. As a result, the archaeological site was not included into the territory of Holosiivskyi National Nature Park, which was established in 2007.

In 2023, the Office of the Prosecutor General of Ukraine appealed for the government to return the lands of Kytaiv into state ownership. However, Kyiv mayor Vitali Klitschko refused to support a petition to protect the area from possible new construction.

== Notable people ==
- Dosithea of Kyiv (born Darya Tiapkina, 1701–1776), cross-dressing monk and wonderworker, who resided in the local monastery.
