= Gottfried Johann Schädel =

German architect (1680–1752)

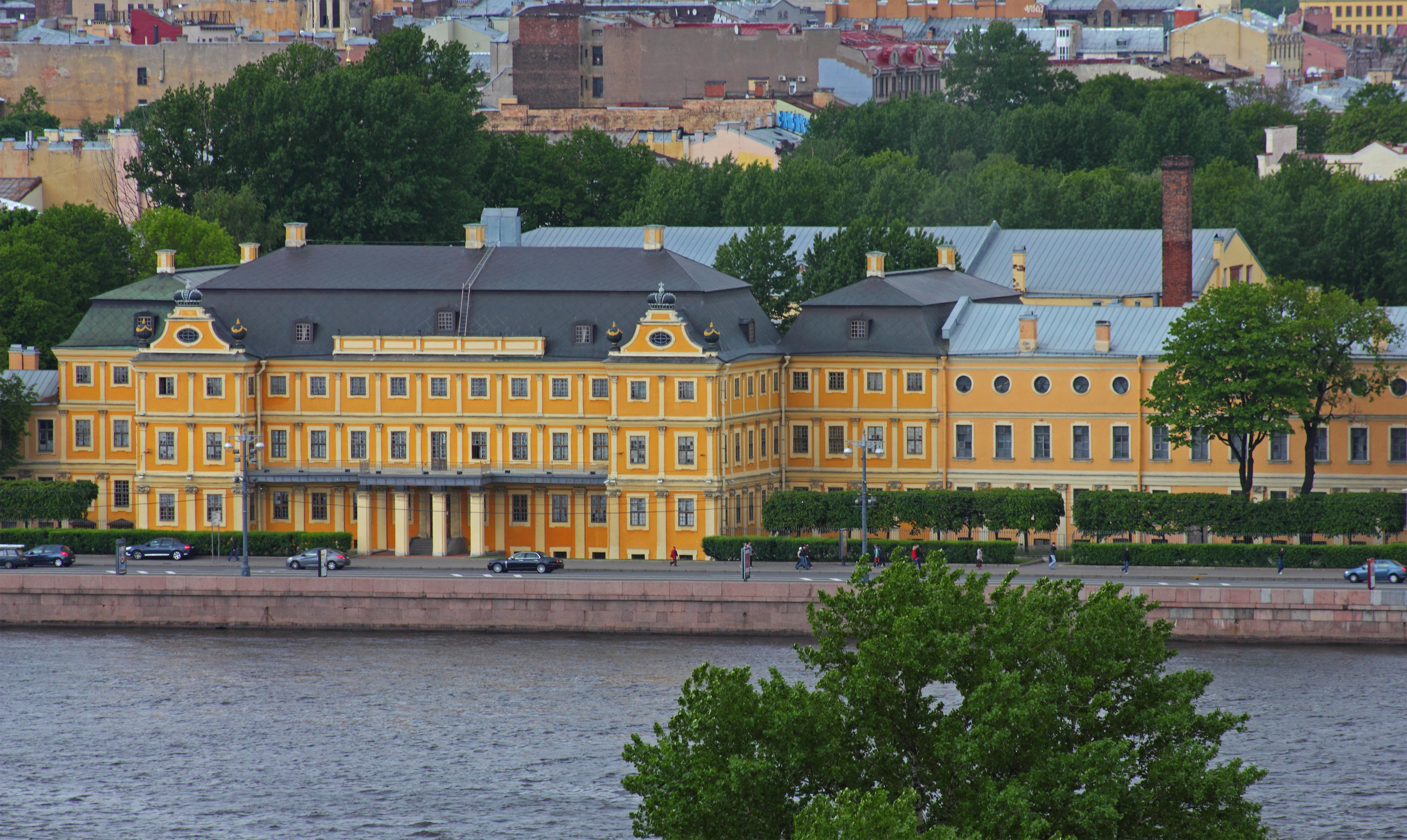
Menshikov Palace in Saint Petersburg

Johann Gottfried Schädel (German: Johann Gottfried Schädel; Russian: Иван Иванович Шедель; 1680–1752) was a German Baroque architect who worked in the Russian Empire, including in Ukraine.

== Life ==
Schädel was born in 1680 in Wandesbek, Duchy of Holstein, Holy Roman Empire (now part of Hamburg).

In 1713, Prince Alexander Menshikov paid him 400 Reichsthaler (384 rubles) to move to Saint Petersburg with his family. After Menshikov's fall from grace, Schädel settled in Moscow where he worked in tandem with the Italian artist Francesco Bartolomeo Rastrelli.

In 1731, Schädel accepted an invitation from the Archbishop of Kiev and moved to Kiev, where he designed the great belltowers of Kiev Pechersk Lavra and St. Sophia Cathedral, the Klov Palace and other notable buildings which altered the city's skyline.

Schädel received no new commissions after 1744 and died in Kiev in poverty in 1752.

== Legacy ==
In 1995, the Ukrainian film director Valentyn Sokolovsky created a documentary about Schädel for the National Television Company of Ukraine.

== Notable buildings ==
- Menshikov Palace
- Great Lavra Bell Tower
- Klov Palace
