= Klov =

Neighbourhood in Kyiv, Ukraine

Coordinates: 50°26′13″N 30°31′55″E

Klov Palace

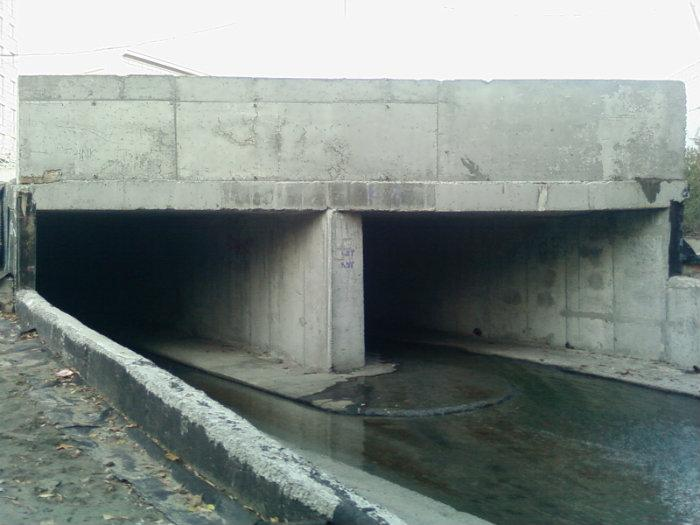
Concrete-encased Klov stream, after which the neighbourhood was allegedly named

Klov (Ukrainian: Клов) is a historical neighbourhood in the Ukrainian capital Kyiv. Nowadays Klov is located in the administrative Pecherskyi District.

The Klovskiy Monastery was built in this area in the 11th century, but was destroyed in 1240 by Batu Khan's army.

The main streets of Klov are Mechnikova Vulytsia and Klovsky Uzviz, where the 18th-century Klov Palace (which hosts the Supreme Court of Ukraine) is situated.

== Public transportation ==
- Klovska metro station.

== Landmarks ==
- Klov Palace
