= Great Lavra Bell Tower =

Coordinates: 50.434691°N 30.556455°E

- Велика Лаврська дзвіниця (Ukrainian)
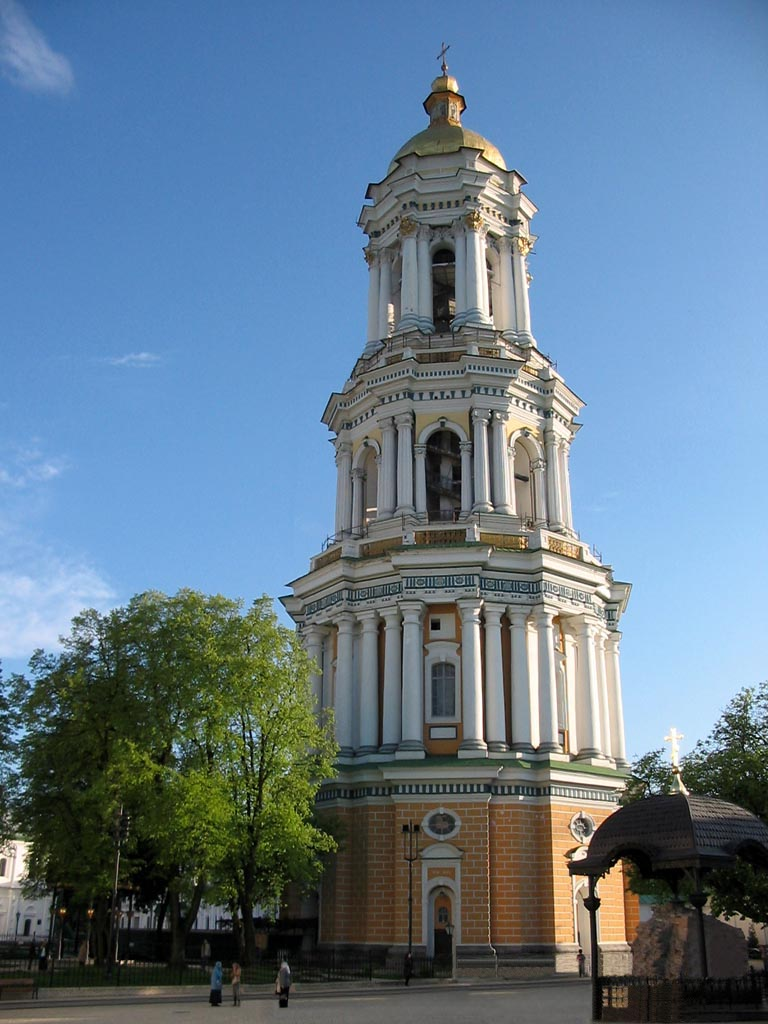
- Up-close view of the Great Lavra Bell Tower with its four tiers in 2005
- Interactive map of Great Lavra Bell Tower

Immovable Monument of National Significance of Ukraine
- Official name: Дзвіниця Успенського собору (Bell tower of the Dormition Cathedral)
- Type: Architecture
- Reference no.: 260088/2

The Great Lavra Bell Tower or the Great Belfry (Ukrainian: Велика Лаврська дзвіниця, romanized: Velyka Lavrska dzvinytsia, Russian: Большая Лаврская колокольня) is the main bell tower of the ancient cave monastery of Kyiv Pechersk Lavra in Kyiv, the capital of Ukraine. It is one of the most notable buildings of the Kyiv skyline.

The bell tower was the highest free-standing bell tower at the time of its construction in 1731–1745. It was designed by the architect Johann Gottfried Schädel. Its total height, with the Christian cross, is 96.5 metres (316 feet).

The Great Lavra Bell Tower is a Neoclassical architecture construction with a total of four tiers, surmounted by a gilded dome. The diameter of the tower's lowest tier at its base is 28.8 metres (94 feet), and the thickness of the first tier walls is 8 metres (26 feet). The tower's foundation exceeds 7 metres (22 feet). It is also inclined in north-eastern direction 62 cm (24 in) from the center point. The tower is decorated with many architectural columns: the second tier is decorated with 32 Dorian columns, the third tier is decorated with 16 Ionic columns, and the fourth with 8 Corinthian columns.

On the third tier, there were some hanging bells, but they were later removed. To this day, only three small 18th-century bells have been preserved: the Balykjoe, and Bezymiannyi bells. The former main bell of the Great Lavra Bell Tower, the Uspenskyi, had a total weight of one ton and was cast in 1732 by Ivan Motorin, who was also responsible for the Moscow Kremlin Tsar Bell. There is also a viewing platform atop the third tier, which provides visitors with a bird's-eye view of the region around Kyiv.

On the fourth tier there is a chiming clock, manufactured in 1903, which has a total weight of 4.5 tons. The current bell tower's clock, designed by the Moscow master A. Enodin and based on the Kremlin clock, replaced the older 18th-century clock of the master A. Levynskyi. The clock has stopped only once during its existence: it happened in September 1941 when the Dormition Cathedral of the Pechersk Lavra was blown up by army forces during the Second World War.

The clock was repaired following the destruction of the nearby cathedral, which took a total of six years to complete. Since that time, the clock has never needed any repairs. The clock's mechanism is very accurate; up to within 10 seconds. However, it has been observed that its accuracy depends on the time of the year: in the winter, the clock works somewhat slower than in the summertime. The clock's mechanism has to be rewound once a week, and the clock's bells chime every quarter of the hour.

== Gallery ==
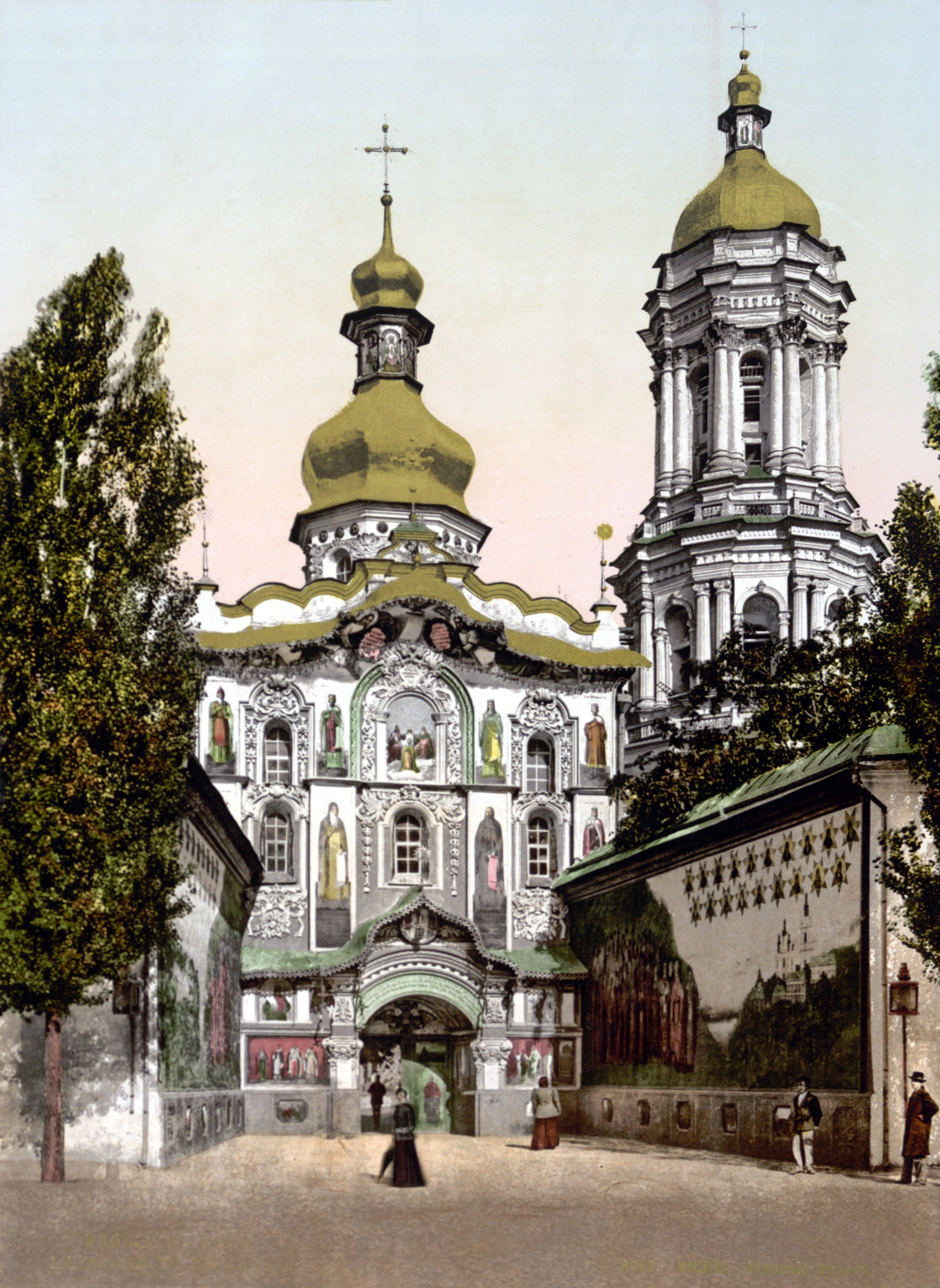
1890s

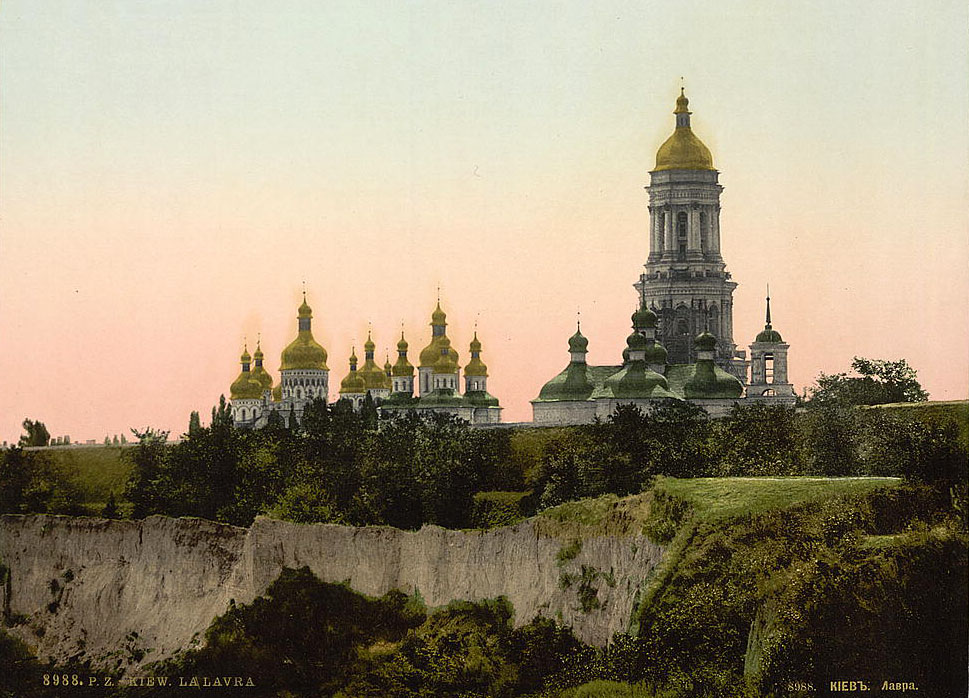
1890s

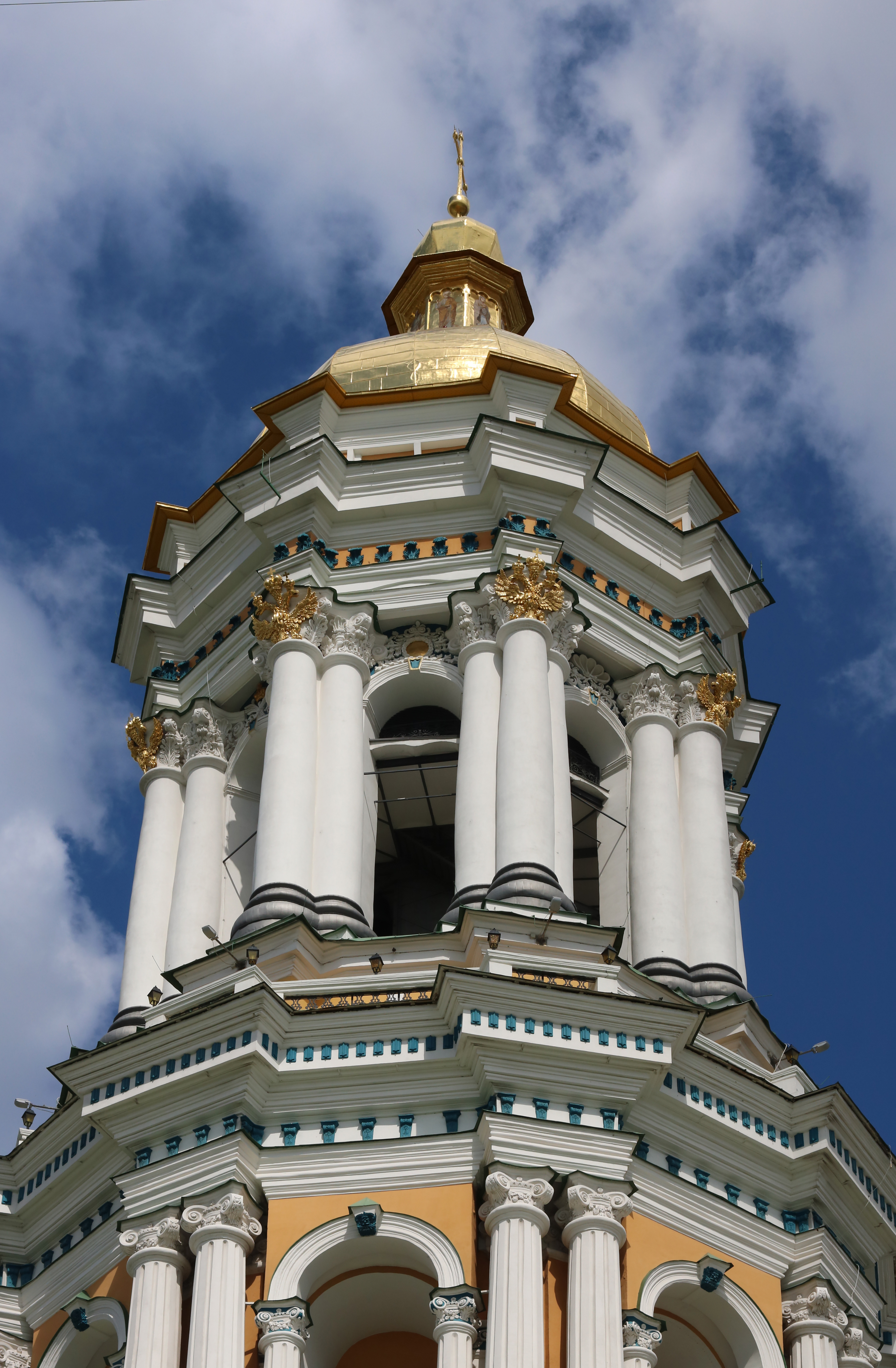
detail

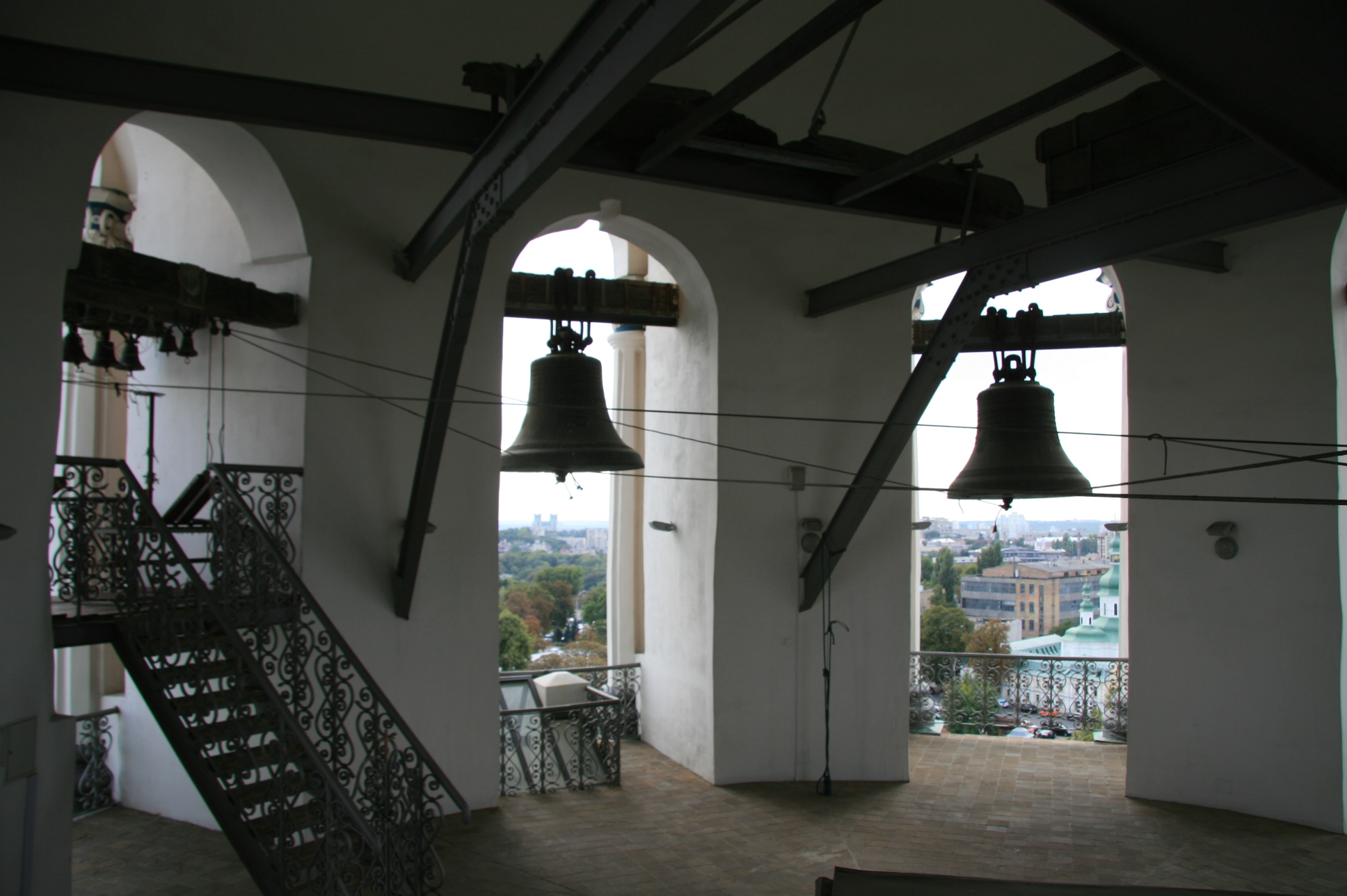
interior

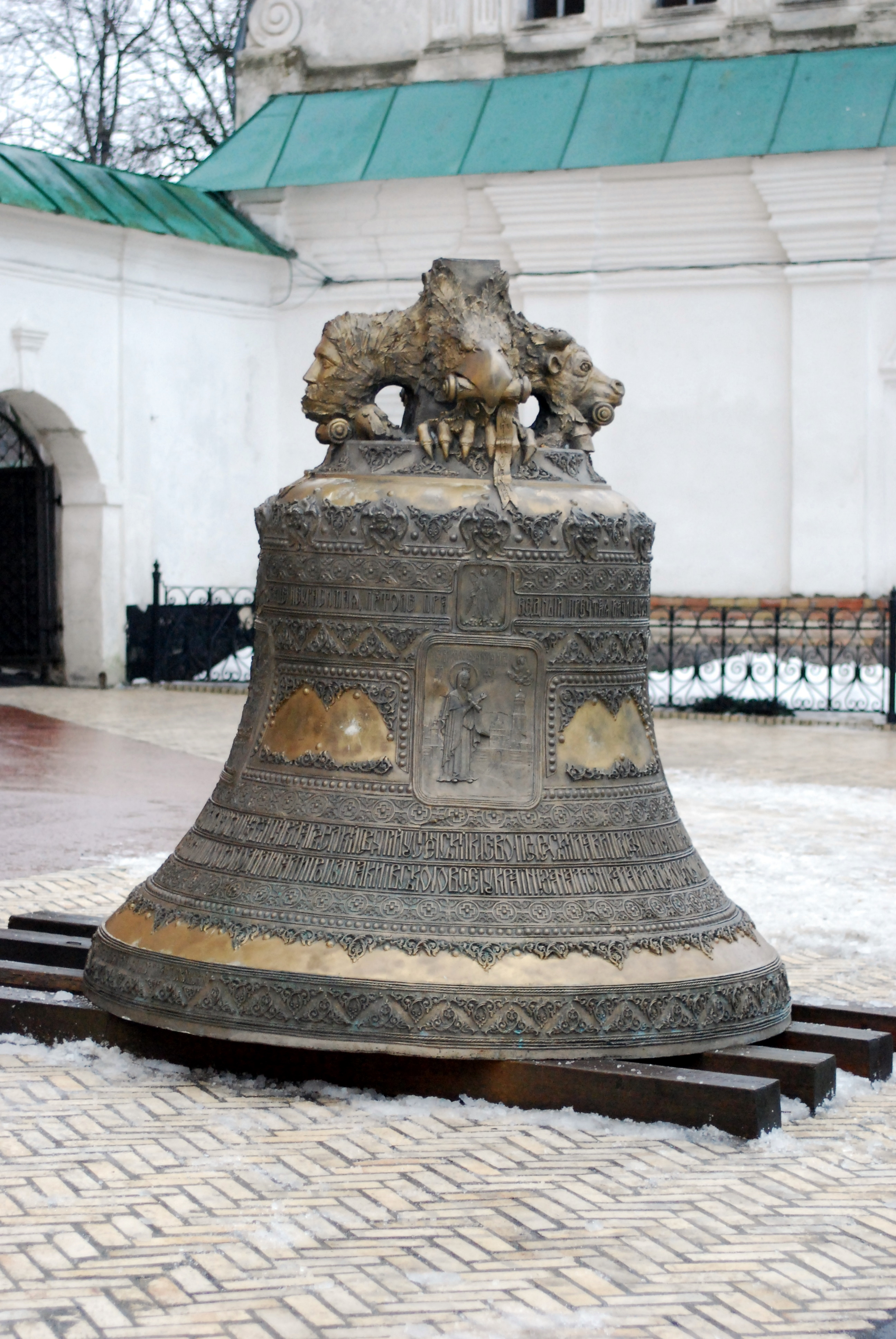
bell

== See also ==
- List of tallest Eastern Orthodox church buildings
- Dormition Cathedral, Kharkiv - the second tallest bell tower in Ukraine
