= St. Michael's Golden-Domed Monastery =

Monastery in Kyiv, Ukraine

Coordinates: 50°27′21″N 30°31′22″E

- Свято-Михайлівський Золотоверхий монастир
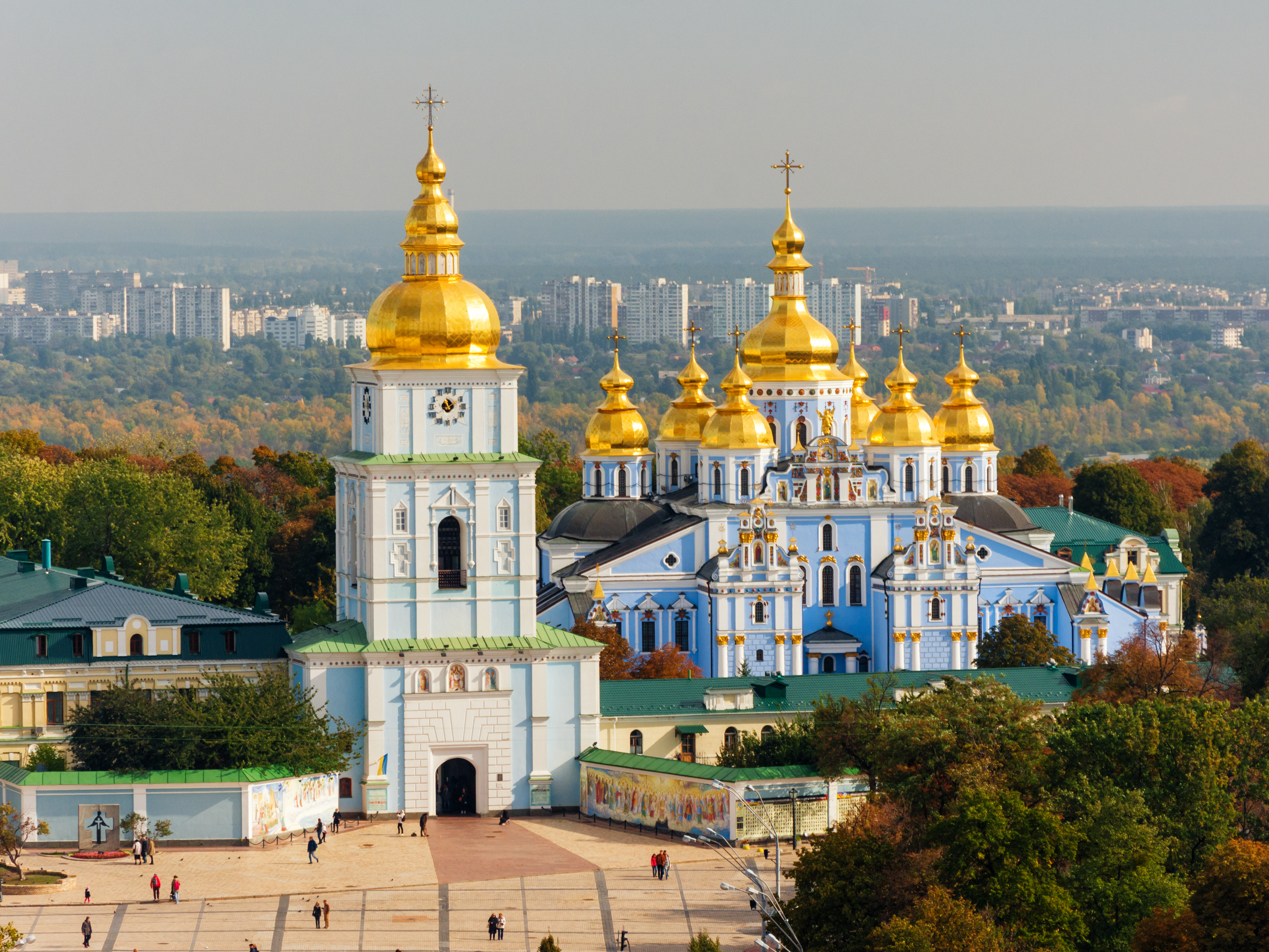
- View overlooking western facade

Monastery information
- Denomination: Orthodox Church of Ukraine
- Established: 1108–1113
- Dedication: Saint Michael the Archangel
- Diocese: Eparchy of Kyiv

People
- Founder: Sviatopolk II of Kyiv
- Abbot: Agapetus
- Metropolitan: Epiphanius of Kyiv

Architecture
- Status: Active
- Heritage designation: An architectural monument of national significance
- Architect: Ivan Hryhorovych-Barskyi (reconstruction)
- Style: Byzantine architecture (interior); Ukrainian Baroque (exterior)
- Completed date: 1999 (reconstruction)

Site
- Location: 8, Trokhsviatytelska Street, Kyiv
- Country: Ukraine
- Website: archangel.kiev.ua

The St. Michael's Golden-Domed Monastery (Note: Ukrainian: Свято-Михайлівський Золотоверхий монастир, romanized: Sviato-Mychajlivśkyj zolotoverchyj monastyr) is a monastery in Kyiv, the capital of Ukraine, dedicated to Saint Michael the Archangel. It is located on an elevated hill above the bank of the Dnipro river, to the northeast of the Saint Sophia Cathedral. The site is in the historical administrative neighbourhood of Upper Town and overlooks Podil, the city's historical commercial and merchant quarter. The monastery has been the headquarters of the Orthodox Church of Ukraine since December 2018.

Originally built in the Middle Ages by the Kievan Rus' ruler Sviatopolk II Iziaslavych, the modern monastery comprises the cathedral church, the Refectory Church of the Holy Apostle and Evangelist John the Theologian, constructed in 1713, the Economic Gate, constructed in 1760, and the bell tower, which was added in the 1710s. The exterior of the structure was remodelled in the Ukrainian Baroque style during the 18th century; the interior retained its original Byzantine architecture.

Much of the monastery, including the cathedral church, was demolished by Soviet authorities in the 1930s. The complex was rebuilt following Ukrainian independence in 1991; the cathedral reopened in 1999.

== History ==
=== Early years ===
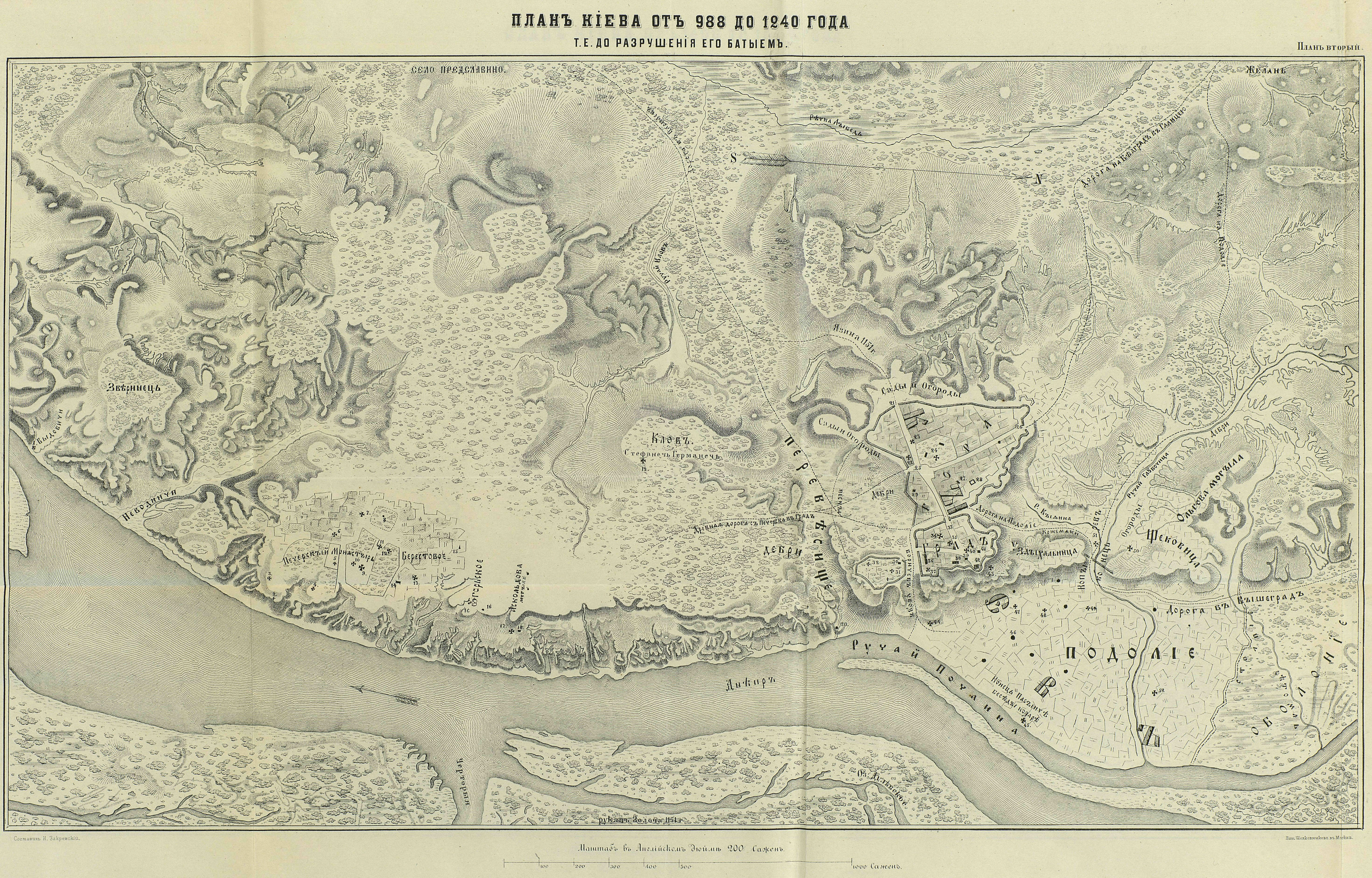
Nikolai Zakrevsky's plan of Kyiv from 988 to 1240, from his Description of Kyiv (1868)

There were once many medieval churches in Kyiv, but nearly all of them were timber-built; none of these have survived. During the 1050s, when Kyiv was a part of the Kievan Rus' state Grand Prince Iziaslav I built a monastery dedicated to Saint Demetrius of Thessaloniki, close to the St Sophia Cathedral. The heads of the monastery were the hegumens of the Kyiv Pechersk Lavra.

According to an 1108 annal from the Laurentian Codex, Iziaslav's son Sviatopolk II of Kyiv founded a stone church in Kyiv, and it is thought that the monastery of St. Michael was founded at the same time. Contemporary chronicles give no account of a foundation, and it is likely that Sviatopolk built the cathedral for the new monastery within the precincts of the monastery of St. Demetrius. There are no historical references to St. Michael's before the end of the 14th century. The church, which was dedicated to Saint Michael the Archangel, Iziaslav's patron saint, may have been built to commemorate Sviatopolk's victory over the Polovtsians, as Michael is the patron saint of war victories.

The exact date of the completion of St. Michael's is unknown. It is considered to have been built between 1108 and 1113, the latter year being when Sviatopolk was buried in the cathedral. By tradition, the relics of Saint Barbara were transferred there during his rule. He was a vassal prince of the kings of Poland, who allowed him the freedom to choose the monastery's hegumens. The cathedral's dome was probably the first in Kievan Rus' to be gilded, and the monastery was likely called "the Golden-Domed" for this reason.

During the Middle Ages, the cathedral became the burial place of members of the ruling Izyaslavych family. The monastery probably came under the control of the Pechersk Lavra c. 1128. St. Michael's sustained damage and was looted during the Mongol invasion in 1240, when Kyiv was occupied. It survived the invasion and subsequent political violence, but afterwards ceased to function as an institution. It was mentioned again in documents only in 1398, and a 1523 charter of Sigismund I the Old described the monastery as being deserted in 1470. It sustained further damage in 1482, during the raid on Kyiv by the Crimean Khan Meñli I Giray, after which it was abandoned. It had re-emerged by 1496, shortly before the epithet "the Golden-Domed" started to be used.

=== 16th–17th centuries ===
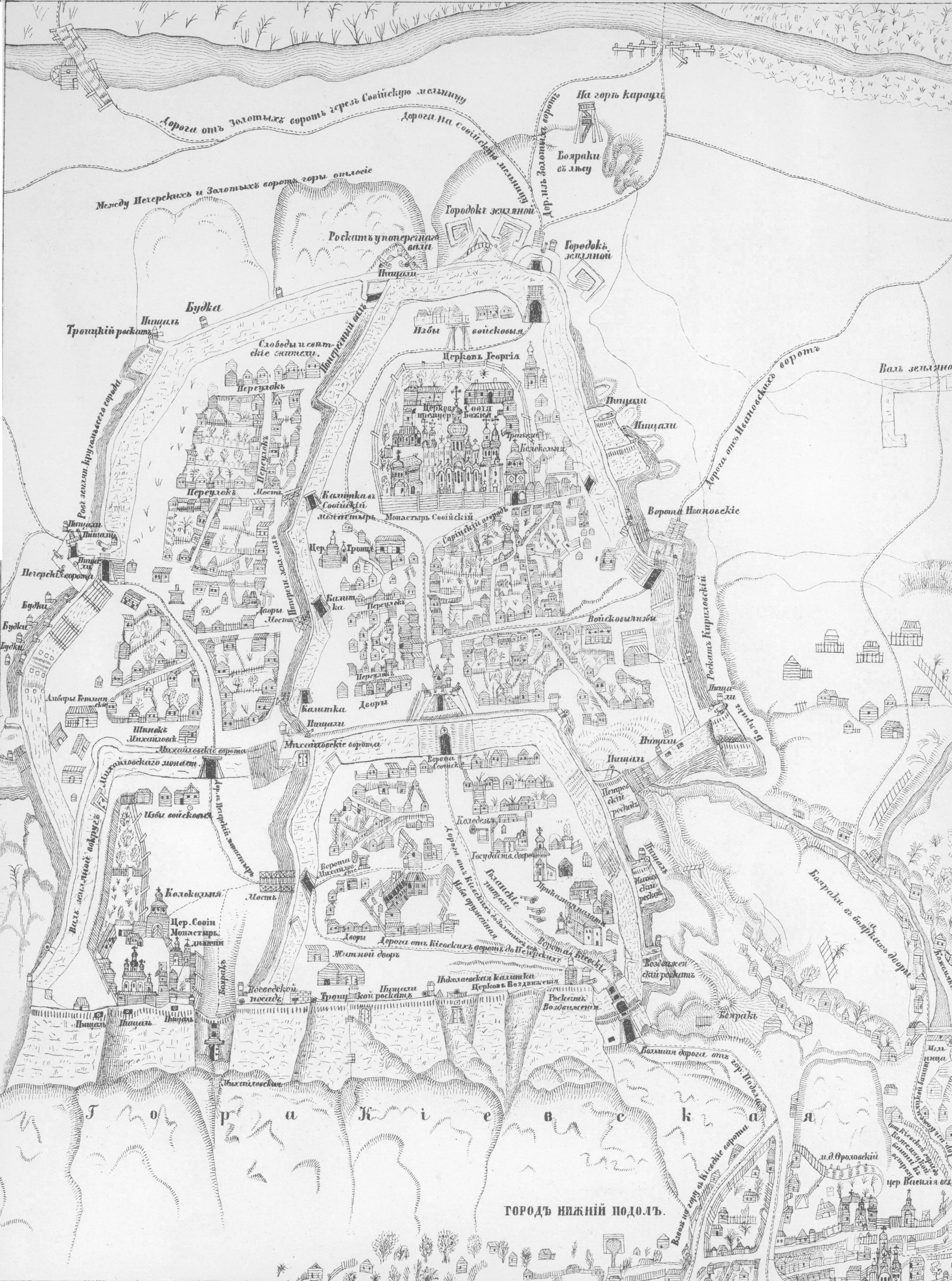
The monastery depicted in part of Lieutenant Colonel Ivan Ushakov's plan of the city (1695)

During the 16th century, St. Michael's became one of the most popular and wealthiest monasteries in what is now Ukraine. From 1523, it was granted freedoms by Sigismund I, who encouraged restoration work to be undertaken.

The Austrian soldier and diplomat Erich Lassota von Steblau visited Kyiv in 1594. He wrote a diary of his travels, later published that year as Tagebuch des Erich Lassota von Steblau, and described the monastery thus:

It is a fine building. In the centre it has a round cupola with a golden roof. The choirs are turned inwards and are also decorated with mosaics. The floor is laid out with small, coloured stones. As one enters the church through the gates which are directly opposite the high altar, one sees on the left a wooden casket which holds the body of a saintly virgin, Barbara, a king's daughter: she was a young girl, about 12 years old, as can be judged by her size. Her remains, covered down to her feet with a piece of fine linen, have not decomposed yet as I myself could observe by touching her feet which were still hard and not deteriorated. On her head there is a gilded crown made of wood.

— Erich Lassota von Steblau (trans. Orest Subtelny), Habsburgs and Zaporozhian Cossacks (1594)

While most of the city's Orthodox clergy and monasteries converted to the Greek Catholic Uniate Church in the 17th century, St. Michael's retained its Orthodox doctrine. In 1612, the Polish king Sigismund III Vasa gave the monastery to the Uniate Church, which never took possession of the monastery and its estates. A wooden refectory church was built in 1613. In 1618, the religious figure Antony Grekovych tried to extend his power over the monastery. This provoked a sharp reaction—the Zaporozhian Cossacks captured him and drowned him in a ditch opposite the Vydubychi Monastery.

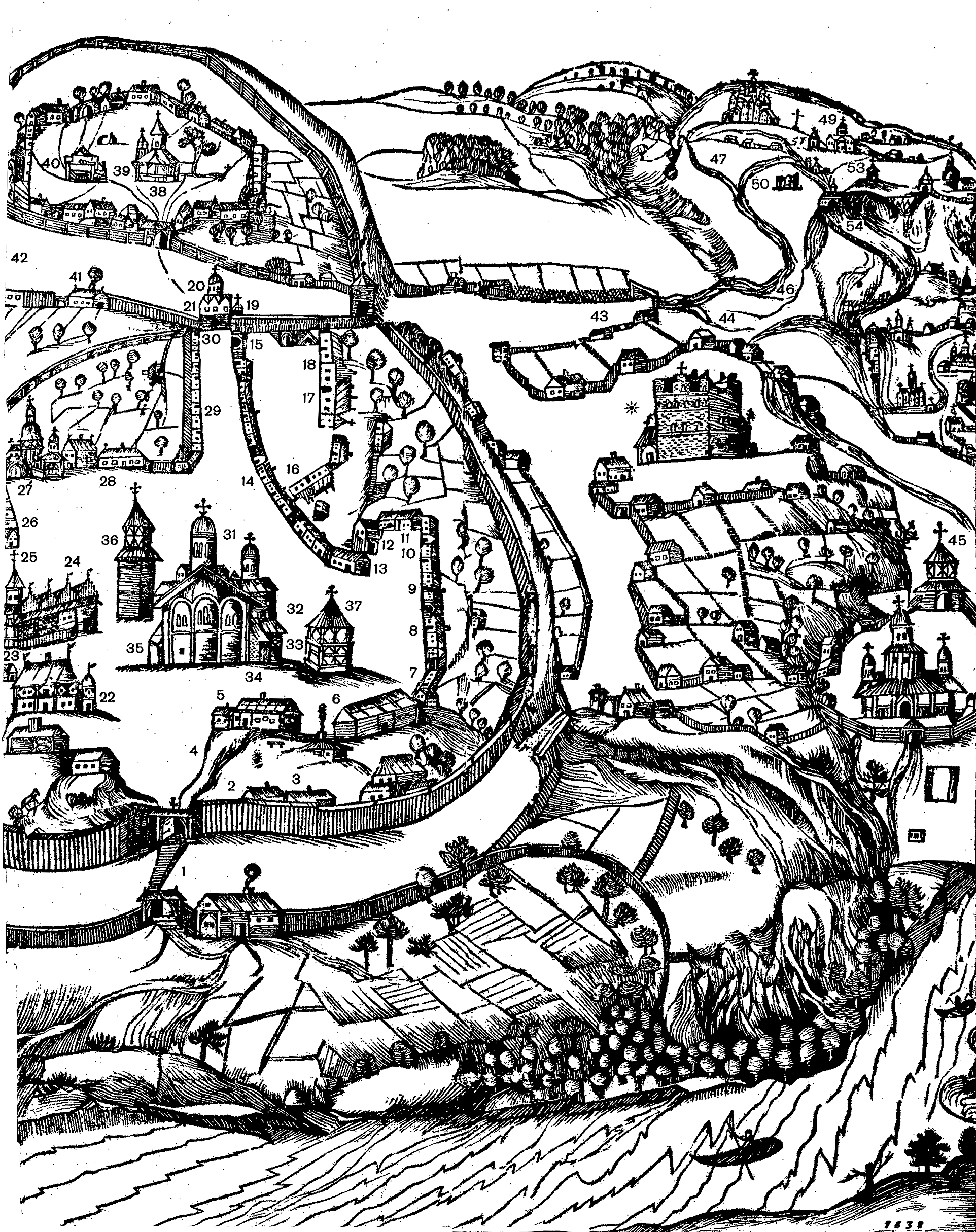
Athanasius Kalnofoisky's 1638 map of Kyiv shows the monastery at the top

In 1620, St. Michael's hegumen Job Boretsky made the monastery's cathedral the seat of the re-established Metropolis of Kyiv, Galicia and all Rus'. The monastery's bell tower and refectory were constructed during his hegumenship. Under Boretsky, a nun's convent was established close to the monastery, on the site of what is now the Kyiv Funicular's upper station. (Note: In 1712, the convent moved to Podil, and the land it occupied passed to the monastery.) During this period a printing house was established. On both a map of Kyiv in Teraturgy (1638), written by the Kyivan monk Athanasius Kalnofoisky, and on a Dutch drawing of 1651, the monastery is shown with its single dome.

The work on rebuilding the medieval cathedral was mentioned by the French engineer Guillaume Le Vasseur de Beauplan in his Description d'Ukranie (1650). The Syrian traveller and writer Paul of Aleppo visited the monastery whilst in Kyiv during the summer of 1654. In describing the church, he compared it with St Sophia in Kyiv and the Hagia Sophia in Constantinople, writing of St. Michael's:

The entire building is of wood, except the magnificent, lofty, and elegant church, which is of stone and lime, and has a high cupola shining with gold. This church consists only of one nave. It is lighted all round with glazed windows. The three churches I have been describing are all of one style of architecture, and of one age.

=== 18th century ===
In 1712, the nuns of St. Michael's, who lived near the monastery, were transferred to a separate institution in the Podil district of Kyiv. The refectory church was built in 1713–1715 in the Ukrainian Baroque style from the bricks of Kyiv's Simeon Church, which had been destroyed by fire in 1676.

The remains of 18th-century foundations for part of the western aisle of the cathedral have been preserved. As indicated by the foundations of the cathedral's extension in the late 17th and early 18th centuries, the northern aisle was added first, followed by the southern aisle in 1709, while the western aisle was built at a later date. It could be seen that the flying buttresses had been put in place to strengthen the structure where it was placed on low-strength soil (soil that cannot support heavy weights). This had become necessary after the dismantling of the old walls of the original church when the cathedral was enlarged.

During the late 18th century, a number of the monastery's properties were sold off. All of its estates were lost in 1786, following a decree issued by Catherine the Great. As a result, the number of monks who could be supported by the monastery greatly reduced, and all new building work stopped.

=== 19th century ===
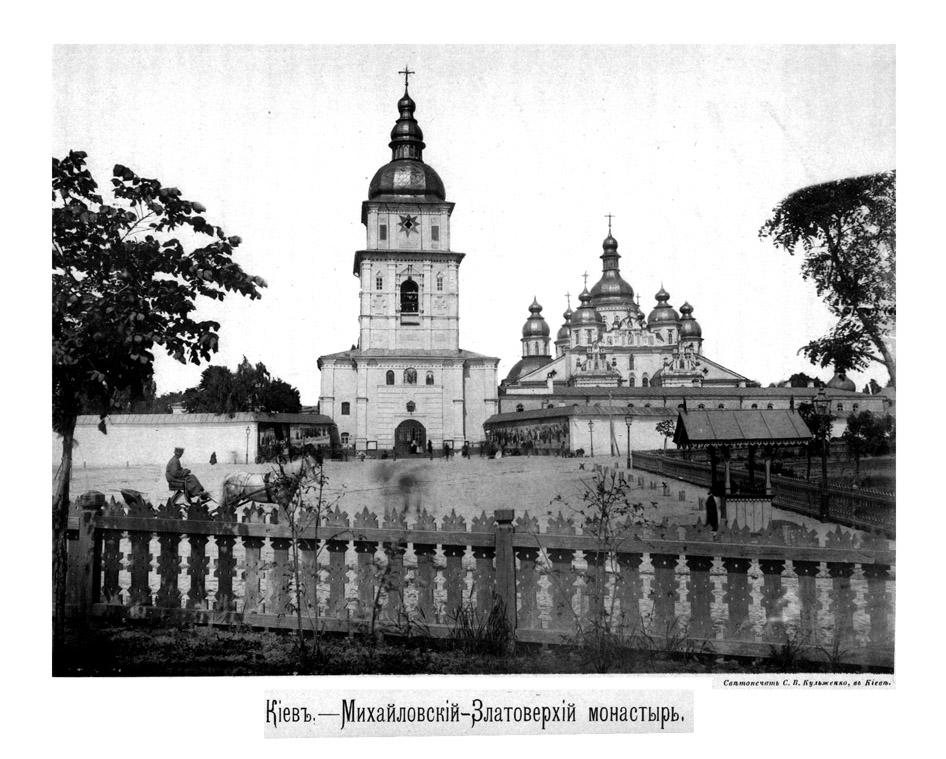
The monastery photographed in 1888

In 1800, the monastery became the residence of both the bishop of Chernihiv and the vicars of the diocese of Kyiv. By the start of the 19th century, the monastery had a library, a teacher training school, and a choir school. The growth of church choirs during this period meant that musical education became a priority for the monastic authorities. The choir at St. Michael's recruited from Chernihiv before musical education began to be imparted. The most important choir in the Kyiv eparchy, St. Michael's choir was also one of the earliest to be formed in the city. In 1886, a singing school was opened, which ran until the start of the 1920s. During the 19th century there were up to 240 monks at St. Michael's.

In the 1880s, the Russian art historian Adrian Prakhov discovered some of the cathedral's 12th-century mosaics and frescoes, which he cleaned and restored. He made life-sized copies of them in oil, and photographed the restoration process. Copies of his work were exhibited in St. Petersburg in 1883 and in Odesa in 1884.

In 1888, the cathedral was equipped with a hot air heating system, and provided with new flooring. The interior decoration was left unaltered. Construction work in the monastery precinct continued up to 1902 and included the construction of a large pilgrims' hotel and a new building for the monks' cells.

=== 20th century ===
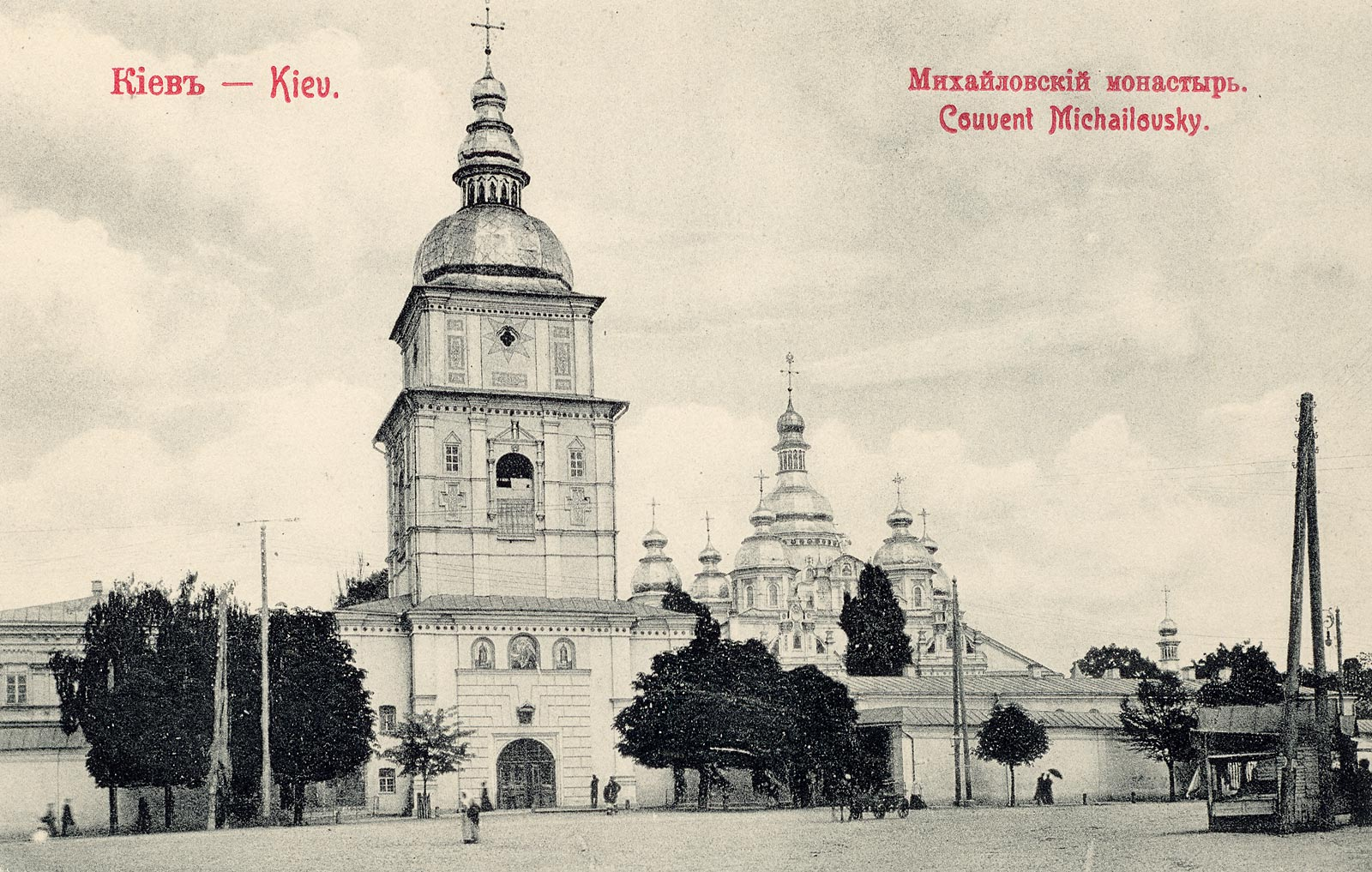
The monastery in the 1900s

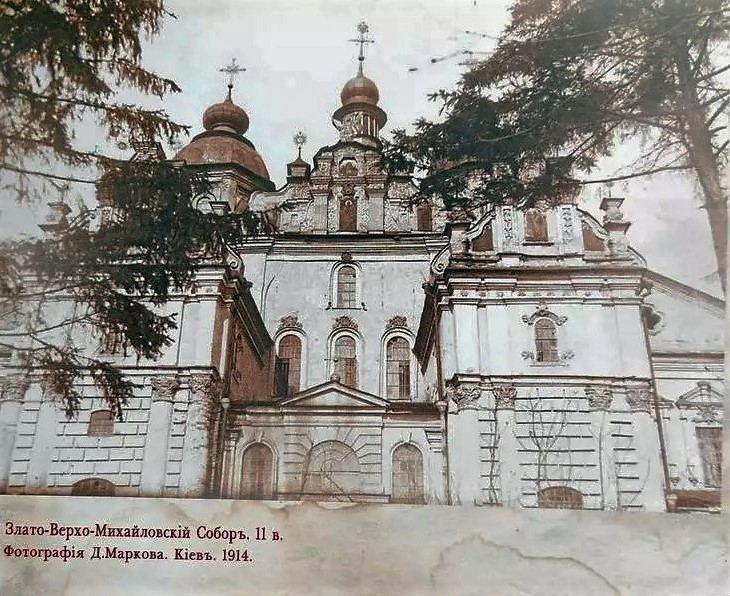
The cathedral photographed in 1914

The refectory church was damaged by a fire in 1904. In 1906, a medieval hoard was discovered in a casket on Trekhsvyatytelska Street (now Triochsvyatitelska Street), opposite the gates of St. Michael's. The hoard, which was dated to the 11th–12th centuries, was probably hidden in 1240, when Kyiv was sacked by the Mongols. Gold jewellery from the hoard is now housed in the Metropolitan Museum of Art in New York; other pieces are in the British Museum.

The cathedral was nearly destroyed in the aftermath of World War I, when it was hit by shells fired by the Bolsheviks. One of the arches supporting the cathedral's central dome was destroyed, and a large hole emerged at the side of the building as a result of the shell damage. In 1919, the monastic buildings were appropriated by the new Soviet government. In 1922, the monastery was closed by the authorities. The refectory was converted into the Proletarian Students' House, and used as a sleeping quarters. The other buildings were used by various institutions, including a driver training school.

=== Demolition and aftermath ===
In January 1934, the government decided to move the Ukrainian capital from Kharkiv to Kyiv, and in April a competition to build a new Government Centre was announced, to be built on the site occupied by St. Michael's. To prevent public protests, the art critics Fyodor Ernst, Mykola Makarenko, and Stefan Taranushenko—who were thought by the authorities to be likely to publicly oppose the demolition—were arrested. Archaeologists, including Volodymyr Goncharov, condoned the proposed demolition of the cathedral, declaring that the buildings dated only from the 17th century. (Note: 19th-century architectural drawings and photographs of the cathedral had shown that parts of the building dated back to the 12th century, and that the northern, southern, and western façades were 17th- and 18th-century additions.) On 26 June, under the supervision of Vladimir Frolov of the Leningrad Academy of Arts, work began on the removal of the 12th-century Byzantine mosaics. They were apportioned among the State Hermitage Museum, the Tretyakov Gallery, and the State Russian Museum. Between 1928 and 1937, surveys of the monastery were made by the Institute of the History of Material Culture of the Ukrainian SSR.

The monastery was systematically demolished between the spring of 1935—when the golden domes of the cathedral were dismantled—and 14 August 1937, when the shell of the cathedral was dynamited. The refectory was left intact, and two buildings used to house the monks, the choristers' building, part of the bell tower's lower southern wall, and the monastery's cellars also survived. The foundations of the cathedral and the bell tower, and one part of the monastery wall were not completely demolished. (Note: Archaeologists have since found that the foundations of the old core of the cathedral were made of large rubble stone bound by opus signinum mortar, and that they were set in rubble-filled ditches that were reinforced with wood fastened with iron pins.)

In 1938, following the demolition of most of the complex, excavations were carried out on the site of the monastery and in adjacent areas. (Note: The site was also excavated in 1940, and 1948–1949.) The information obtained consisted of documents and photographs of the ruins of the interior and exterior of the cathedral, and of the excavation process. The new headquarters of the Central Committee of the Communist Party of Ukraine was built on the site of the demolished Three Saints Church. (Note: The building, which was severely damaged by the invading Germans during World War II, now houses the Ukrainian Ministry of Foreign Affairs.) Work on the site of the demolished monastery was interrupted by World War II, but resumed after the liberation of Kyiv in 1944. The refectory church was then used as a canteen for archaeology students. The empty site was converted into sports pitches, and until the mid-1970s, the refectory was used as an indoor sports facility. The refectory and several of the other surviving buildings were threatened with destruction in the 1970s, when a Lenin Museum was planned to be built on the site. The refectory, at that time in a state of disrepair, was restored.

=== Restoration ===
==== Plans and preparatory work ====
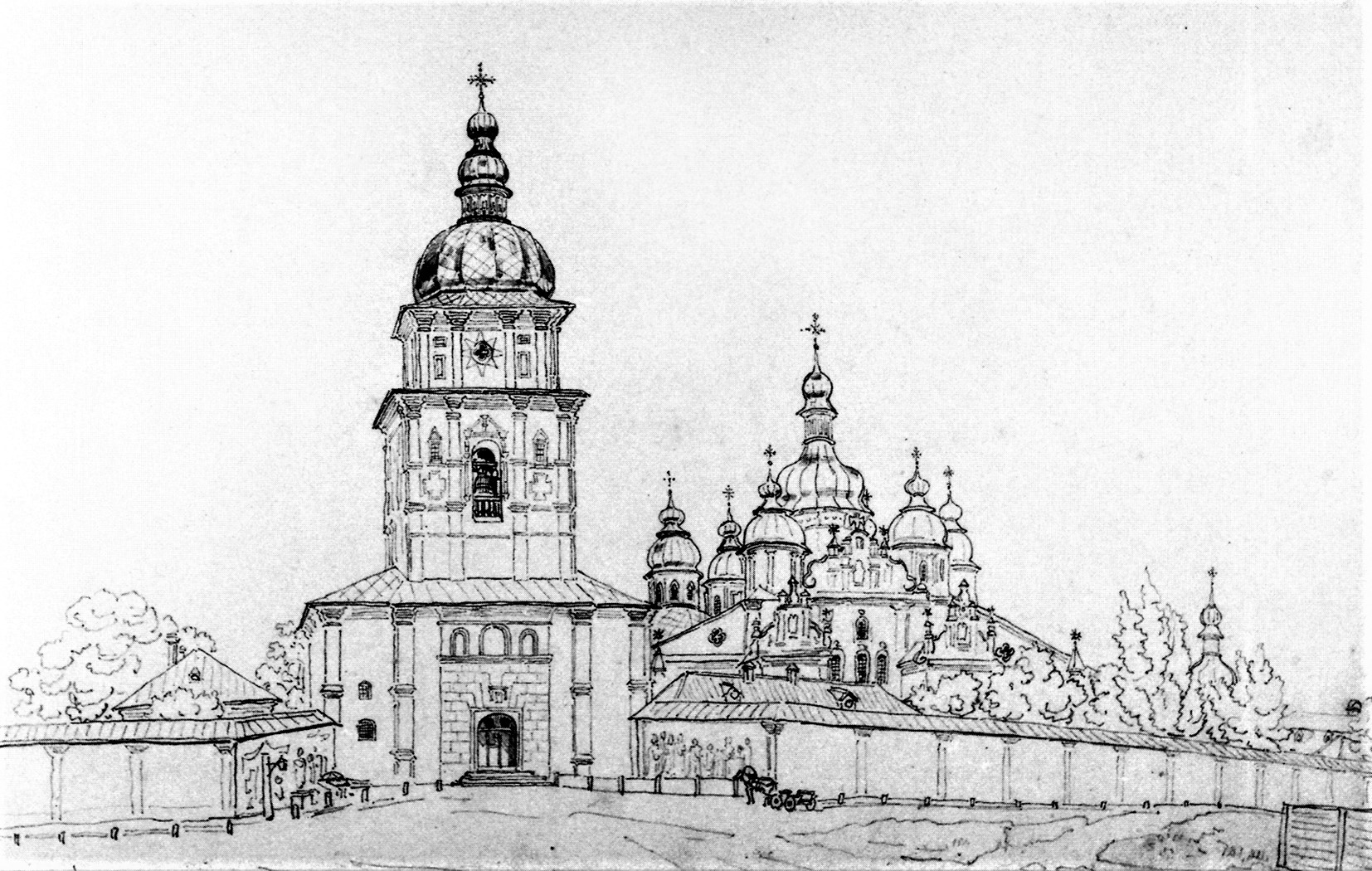
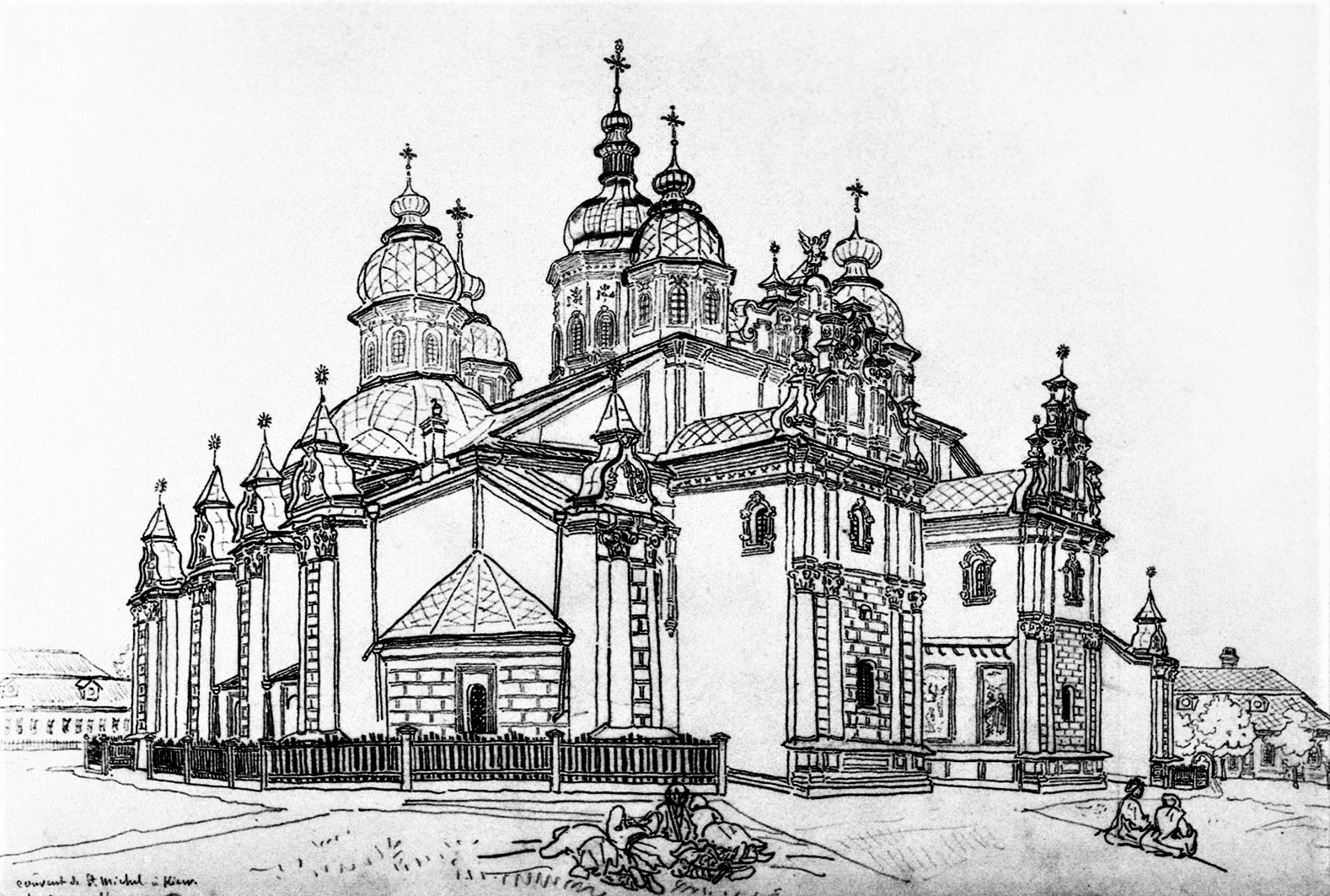
Drawings by Carl Peter Mazér of St. Michael's Golden-Domed Monastery and its cathedral (1851), which were used to help rebuild the complex

The idea to rebuild the monastery was first suggested in 1966 by the Russian architect Pyotr Baranovsky. The proposal had public support, and was backed by the newly founded Ukrainian Society for the Protection of Historical and Cultural Monuments. During the 1970s, architects and engineers worked out plans for reconstructing the monastery. These were only seriously considered after Ukraine became an independent state in 1991, when there were calls for the monastery's full-scale reconstruction as part of the rebuilding of the country's lost cultural heritage.

The Swedish artist Carl Peter Mazér had visited Ukraine in 1851 and made a series of architectural drawings. Included were depictions of St. Michael's Golden-Domed Monastery and the interior of the cathedral. The drawings are a unique record of mid-19th-century Kyiv, (Note: Mazér's drawings were shown at a 1999 exhibition in the National Art Museum of Ukraine in Kyiv.) and were accurate enough to be used to help rebuild the monastery. Documentation produced by Ipolit Morgilevskyi, the Soviet architectural historian prior to the destruction of the monastery, were also used. To determine the new building's correct orientation and position, an old photograph taken from the 12th storey of the bell tower was used to produce an electronically generated drawing—a technique first used for the reconstruction of the city's Fountain of Samson.

The monastery was designed to include the Ukrainian Baroque additions it had possessed at the time of its destruction. The restorers researched Baroque-style imagery to incorporate into the parts of the monastery known to have been built in the 17/18th centuries, such the cathedral's side aisles dedicated to St. Barbara and St. Catherine of Alexandria. The core of the cathedral's interior was planned to look as it might have appeared during the 11th century. Drawings and photographs of the 12th-century mosaics and frescoes were used as templates, and the styles of the interiors of extant Rus' and Byzantine churches such as St. Sophia's Cathedral and the Church of St. Cyril were copied.

During the excavation work, which was done by the NASU Institute of Archaeology between 1992 and 1995, over 300 graves were found, and a unique 11th-century carved slate slab was discovered. During 1996/1997, the foundations were left exposed for a year, which resulted in damage being caused to the surviving foundations. The original foundations of the bell tower were found to have laid down as a result of poor workmanship, with rubble stone and bricks of an indifferent quality being used. The foundations had consequently deteriorated, and so were never planned to be used for the restoration. The site was sanctified on 24 May 1997.

==== Rebuilding the monastery ====
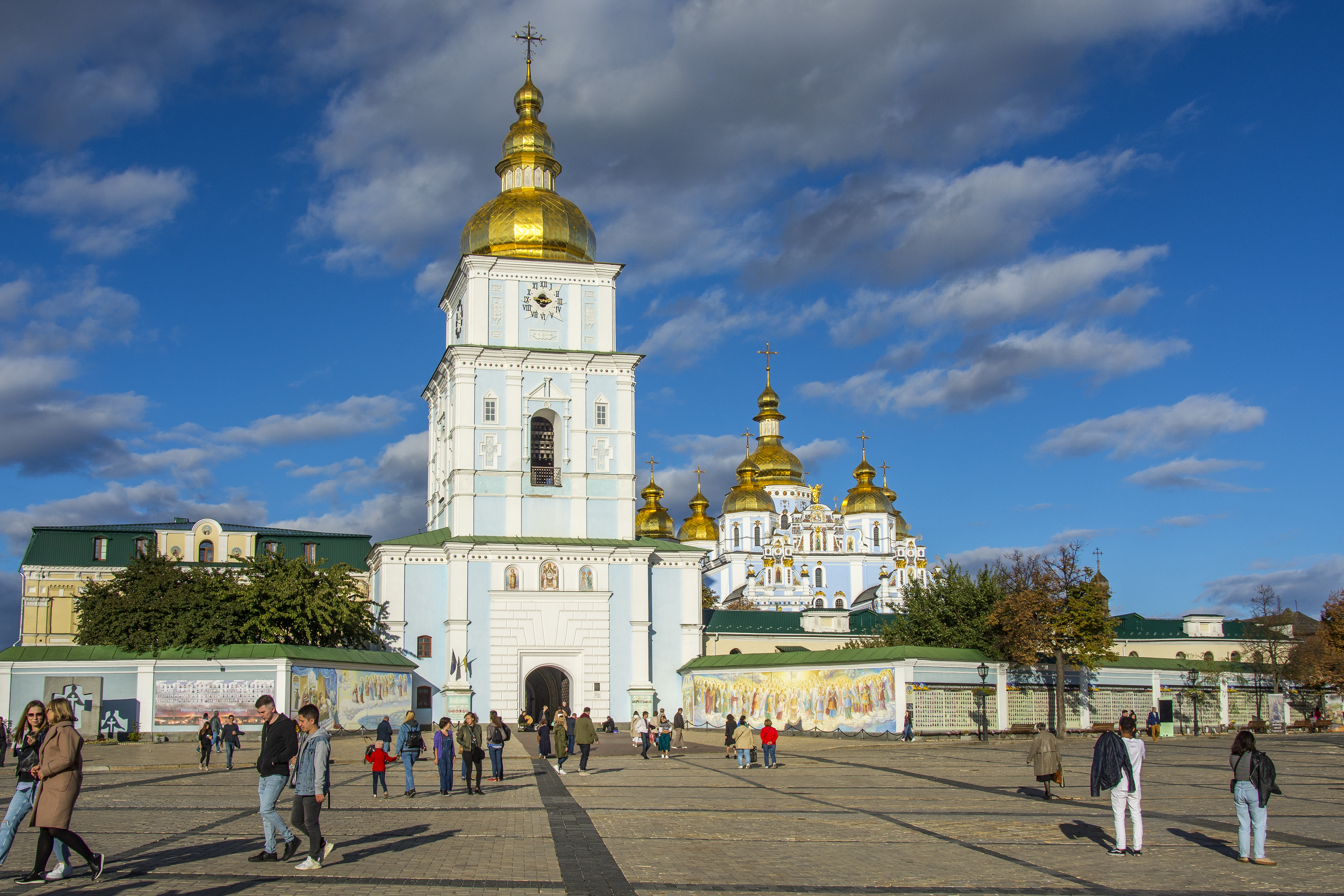
The monastery photographed in 2019

The western end of the boundary walls and the Economic Gate were rebuilt first, followed by the bell tower, which was then used as a temporary observation platform. Later, the murals on the walls were restored. Work on the rebuilding of the cathedral church officially began on 24 May 1997, with building work continuing from November 1998 until the end of 1999. A new church on the second floor of the bell tower was built, dedicated to the Three Saints. The church was consecrated in 1999 in memory of the destroyed church of the same name, and to all the Ukrainian victims of Soviet repression.

The new bells in the 48.28 metres (158.4 ft) high tower were rung for the first time on 30 May 1998. Most of the bells, including the seven heaviest ones, were cast at Novovolynsk in western Ukraine. Their weights range from 2 kilograms (4.4 lb) to 8 tonnes. A computer-controlled keyboard for operating the carillon of the bell tower, not found elsewhere in Ukraine, works 12 bells that are tuned chromatically. A new electronic clock was installed, the bell tower's chimes sound every hour, and can play 23 well-known Ukrainian melodies.

The ceremony to sanctify the completed cathedral took place on 28 May 2000. Amongst the attendees was then Ukrainian president Leonid Kuchma. The cathedral was officially reopened on 30 May 1999, prior to the interior decorations, mosaics, and frescoes being completed on 28 May 2000. The side chapels were consecrated to St. Barbara and St. Catherine in 2001.

The rebuilt cathedral has received criticism for being based on "renditions of scantily recorded and insufficiently studied predecessors", and for being constructed upon the historical remains of the destroyed cathedral. According to the historian Olenka Z. Pevny, "the recreated cathedral not only memorializes the present view of the past, but draws attention to the perspective contemplation embodied in 'preserved' cultural-historical sites."

The Museum of the History of St. Michael's Golden-domed Monastery is situated on the first floor of the bell tower. It was established in 1998 to exhibit some of the many excavation finds.

==== Metropolitan see ====
In the years following the Declaration of Independence of Ukraine in 1991, the refectory church was returned by the Ukrainian government to the religious community. It became one of the first churches in Kyiv to hold services in the Ukrainian language. The monastery became the headquarters of the Orthodox Church of Ukraine after the church's creation on 15 December 2018. St. Michael's Golden-Domed Monastery is used as the headquarters of the Metropolitan of Kyiv and all Ukraine. The rector of the monastery has the rank of diocesan bishop. The Metropolitan of Kyiv and All Ukraine, and the primate of the Orthodox Church of Ukraine, is Epiphanius of Kyiv.

The vicar of St. Michael's is Agapit (Humenyuk), who was appointed on 10 November 2009. When the Kyiv Orthodox Theological Academy restarted in 1992, the refectory became the Kyiv Theological School's church.

== Architecture ==
Plan of the restored St. Michael's Golden-Domed Monastery: 1. Cathedral of St. Michael the Archangel; 2. Monks' cells; 3. Bell tower; Holy Gate; 4. Economic Gate; 5. Choristers' cells; 6. Refectory with the Church of St. John the Theologian; 7. Pilgrims' hotel; 8. Hotels

The monastery's four main buildings were the domed cathedral, the refectory, the hotel accommodation (originally built in 1858), and the hegumen's accommodation block (first built in 1857). The 11th century church was located in what became the centre of the cathedral. where the originally single dome was located. A miniature church, likely a baptistery, may have adjoined the cathedral from the south. As with the cathedral, the baptistery could have been topped by a dome.

=== Dates, styles and architects ===
The names of the architects and artists involved in building the medieval monastery are unknown, but the icon painter Alypius of the Caves, who is associated with the paintings in the Kyiv Pechersk Lavra, is traditionally considered to have been involved in decorating the cathedral church.

=== Cathedral (11th–20th century structure) ===
The 11th-century cathedral was modelled on the Assumption Cathedral of the Monastery of the Caves. It was designed with the Greek cross plan prevalent during the time of the Kievan Rus', adapted from churches built in the Byzantine style, and had six pillars. It had three naves and three apses on the eastern side. Maps of Kyiv from 1638 and 1651 show the cathedral with its single dome. There was also a tower with a staircase leading to the choir loft; it was incorporated into the northern part of the narthex rather than protruding from the main block as was common at the time. Using donations from the Cossack commander Bohdan Khmelnytsky, the cathedral dome was gilded during the period when he was the hetman of the Zaporozhian Host.

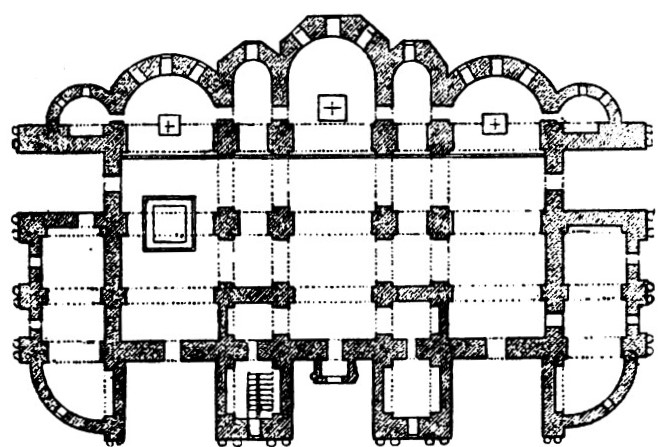
Plan of the cathedral by Dmitry Aynalov and Egor Redin, Ancient Monuments of Art in Kyiv (1899)

The building began to be enlarged during the 16th century, but the main changes to the cathedral occurred a century later. Along with many of Kyiv's Byzantine churches, during the 17th and 18th centuries, the cathedral was remodelled and was given a Baroque exterior. In 1715 and in 1731, two side aisles (St. Catherine's from the south and St. Barbara's from the north) were added to the original core of the building. The St. Catherine aisle, which replaced the 15th-century Church of the Entry of the Lord into Jerusalem, was paid for by Peter I and Catherine I. At the same time, large arches were pierced into the ancient northern and southern walls. The arches weakened the structure and necessitated the addition in 1746 of massive arc-boutants (flying buttresses) with single-storey rooms between them and two tall protrusions on the western facade.

The cathedral was largely rebuilt between 1746 and 1754, which caused the central dome to split into four. A seven-domed structure was then created. As the cathedral was enlarged over the centuries, it had the effect of making the interior darker. The upper tiers of the 1718 iconostasis were removed in 1888, when the Eucharist mosaic was revealed. 1908, the cathedral was given underfloor heating, new parquet floors, and vestibules for the entrances.

=== Rebuilt cathedral ===
In 1992, the decision was made to excavate the site before rebuilding the monastery. The Ukrainian government produced a draft program for the rebuilding of historical and cultural monuments, and in 1998 the List of Historical and Cultural Monuments Subject to Reproduction of Top Priority was approved. (Note: It has been calculated that more than 10,000 buildings were destroyed during the 20th century, including St. Michael's Golden-Domed Cathedral, the Assumption Cathedral of the Kyiv Pechersk Lavra, the Dormition Cathedral of the Kyiv Pechersk Lavra, and Chersonesus Cathedral.)

Part of the ancient cathedral was uncovered and found to be still intact; this structure today makes up a part of the current cathedral's crypt.

==== Exterior ====
The cathedral could have been reconstructed to look as it last appeared in the 1930s, or as it was in 1840, when detailed records were made by the architect Pavlo Sparro. It was decided to restore it to its appearance when it was first remodelled in the Ukrainian Baroque style, thus avoiding the need to reconstruct the extensions made after this period that had caused structural issues, or include outbuildings that had been added in later years.

The total area of the cathedral is 74.5 square metres (802 sq ft); its height is 39 metres (128 ft); and the central cross is 4.2 metres (14 ft) high. The building's walls and vaults are constructed in brick. The outside walls are blue, with those parts that project being painted white or gold. The cathedral walls are approximately 50 centimetres (20 in) above the level of the 11th-century foundations. Both the original foundations and a staircase were not destroyed in the 1930s, and are able to be viewed. The newly made concrete foundations were designed to reach a depth of 15 metres (49 ft), but still allow the remains buried underground to be inspected.

==== Interior ====
The interior was painted throughout, the central core being in the style of the ancient Rus' frescoes, and the aisles in a baroque style. New mosaics were commissioned for the high altar and the main dome.

The interior decorations, mosaics, and frescoes were not completed until 2000. Some of the paintings could be recreated using archive photographs, but for those in St. Catherine's aisle, 18th-century examples of paintings from other buildings had to be used. The reconstruction of the cathedral's interior showed the effectiveness of advanced paint technologies. Keim's process was used, which made the artworks more resistant to surface dirt, light, moisture, temperature variation, and the effects of microorganisms. In 2001 and 2004, 18 art works were returned to Kyiv from Moscow.

=== Refectory ===
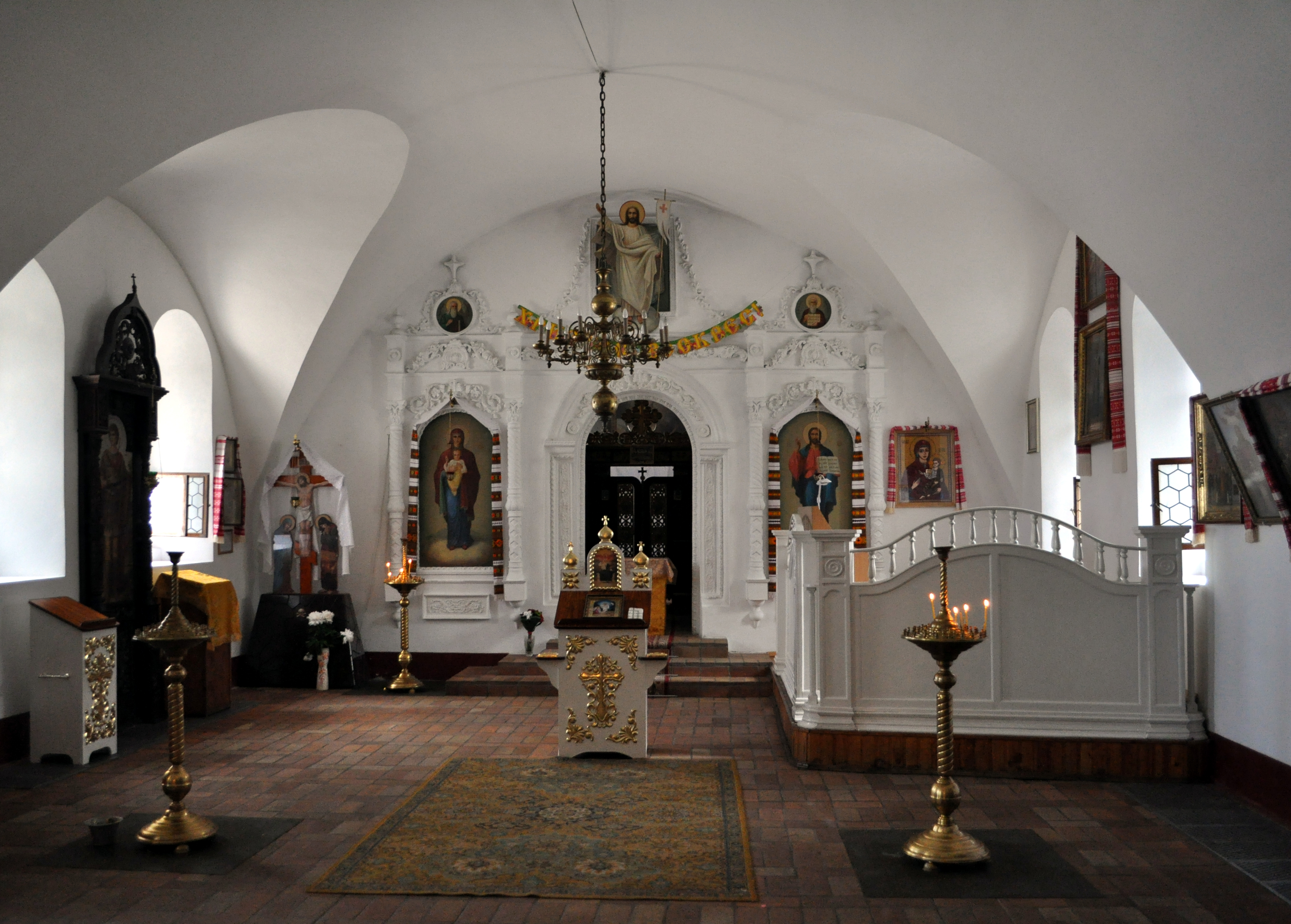
Interior of the refectory church

The refectory church is a small, one-story structure typical of Orthodox monasteries. The main entrance was originally on the northern side, and was lavishly decorated. In 1787, the church was described as being stone-built with a gilded cross above the bell tower, with a sheet-iron roof painted green, the main roof being iron and painted red. The iconostasis gate was carved and gilded. An architectural drawing made by Sparro in 1847 shows the building with three entrances. In 1824, during the rectorship of Bishop Athanasius of Chyhyryn, the roof of the refectory, was repainted green, as were the iron roofs of other monastic buildings.

In 1715–1718, at the expense of Kyiv Metropolitan Joasaf Krokovsky, a single-tier carved wooden and gilded iconostasis was installed in the refectory church. It is considered that the church was built using the bricks of Kyiv's Simeon Church at Kudriavka that burnt down in 1676. A description from 1880 describes the iconostasis as having images of God the Father with the Holy Spirit, the Annunciation, Mary, the Nativity of Jesus, the four Evangelists, the Epiphany, and the Introduction of the Mother of God into the Church. During the renovation of the refectory in 1837, the shrine was decorated with a new wall painting. By 1845, the walls had been decorated with 23 icons. 1850s sources describe a painting of the Miracle of the fishes and the loaves on the ceiling.

In 1904, the temple was significantly damaged by fire, but the shrine was soon restored. During the Soviet period, the religious painting was whitewashed. In 1937, the refectory church of John the Theologian was the only sacred building that remained intact during the destruction of the monastery.

In August 1963, the preserved refectory of the demolished monastery without its Baroque cupola was designated a monument of architecture of the Ukrainian SSR. The building was restored between 1976 and 1981 under the leadership of the architect Valentyna Shevchenko. When the ceilings were rebuilt, the 1780s southern extension was removed, and the roof replaced with a Baroque-style shingle roof. As part of the 1970s restoration, the painting was restored, which was preserved only in the lower tier of the altar part; the composition depicts the Resurrection, the image of the four Evangelists, and two seraphim. The preserved part of the wall painting was created by an unknown master in the style of classicism. After the restoration, the building was used to house the Museum of Ceramics of the State Architectural and Historical Reserve, also known as the "Sophia Museum". In 1998, the shrine was restored.

With the restoration of Ukraine's independence, in the early 1990s, the church was returned to the religious community. The Church of John the Theologian became one of the first churches in Kyiv where services were held in the Ukrainian language. In 1997–1998, the refectory church of John the Theologian became the first building to be restored in the architectural ensemble of the St. Michael Golden-Domed Monastery. Also at this time, the shrine was restored to its historical appearance, covering the roof and baths with shingles, a roofing material made of wedge-shaped boards.

In 2014, during the Revolution of Dignity, the temple was equipped with an improvised hospital where the wounded were treated.

=== Other buildings ===
A 1911 lithograph shows the arrangement of the precinct during the early part of the 20th century, with the cathedral, the bell tower with the Holy Gate, the bishop's house with the Cross Church of St. Nicholas, the choristers' cells, the refectory, and the cells for the older monks all depicted.

The three-tiered bell tower built over the entrance to the monastery was the oldest example of a brick-built bell tower in Kyiv. In around 1631, Boretsky entered into an agreement with the "mason Peter Nimets, a citizen of Kyiv" to construct a brick bell tower. Instead, a three-storey wooden tower was built. This was replaced in 1716–1720 with the new structure, which had a gilded dome and was made with bricks taken from the destroyed St. George's Church in Oster, which had belonged to the monastery. There were 23 bells in the tower.

In the south-east part of the monastery precinct was a farm, gardens and an area for cultivating vegetables. The farmyard was surrounded by stables for the horses, and a carriage house. Other buildings in the precinct included a hospital, a treasury building, and a school. The entrance to the monastery's cellars was close to the Economic Gate. In 1908, a pair of four-storey accommodation blocks were built, forming an independent block with their own courtyard.

The monastery and the nunnery (before the nuns were relocated) were both surrounded by walls, and separated from each other by parallel rows of monastic cells. The Economic Gate was a traditional mid-18th-century Ukrainian feature, being an arch flanked by columns and topped with a decorated pediment. Its position at an angle to the wall is unusual.

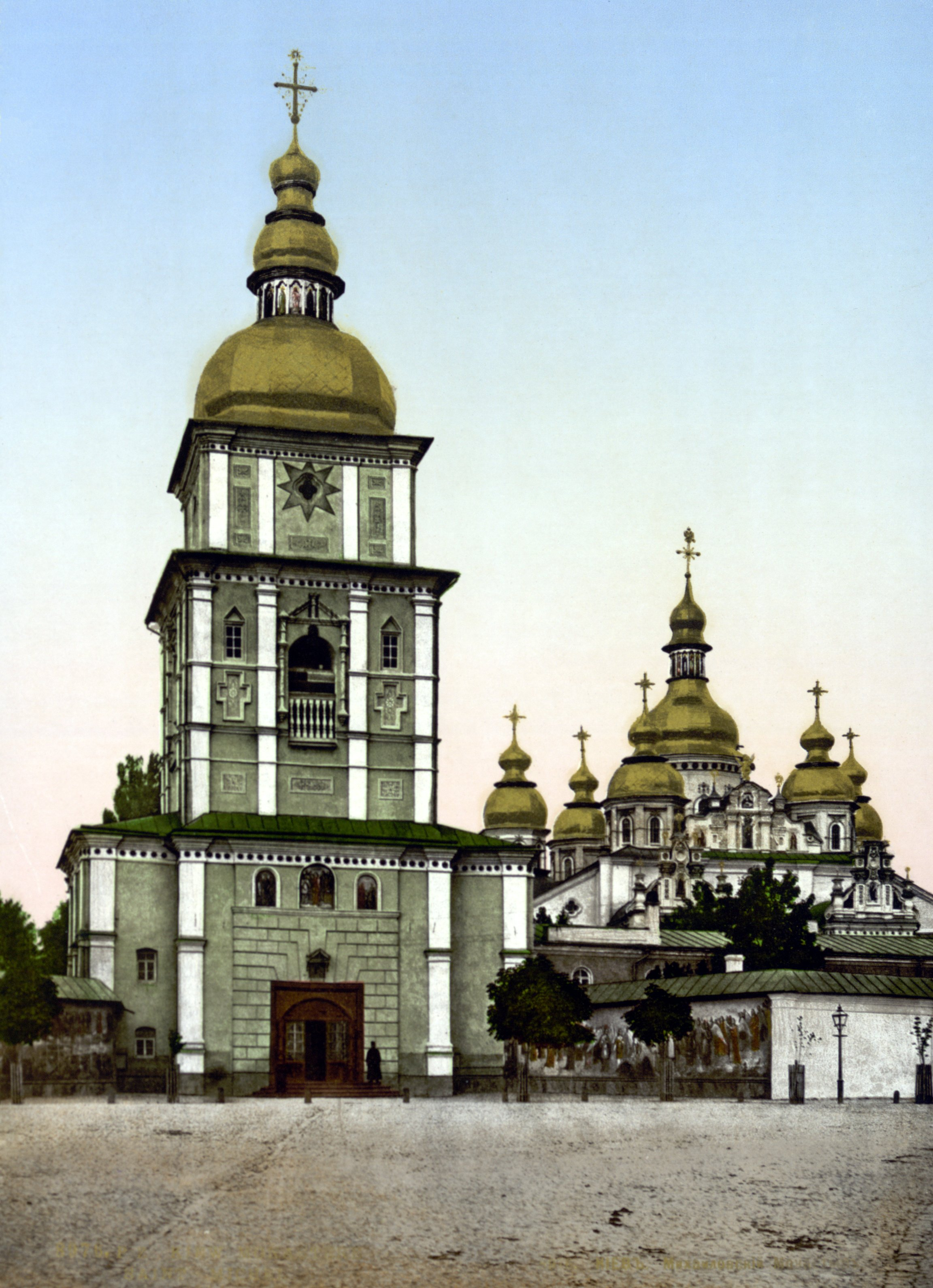
The pre-1930s bell tower and cathedral depicted on a postcard

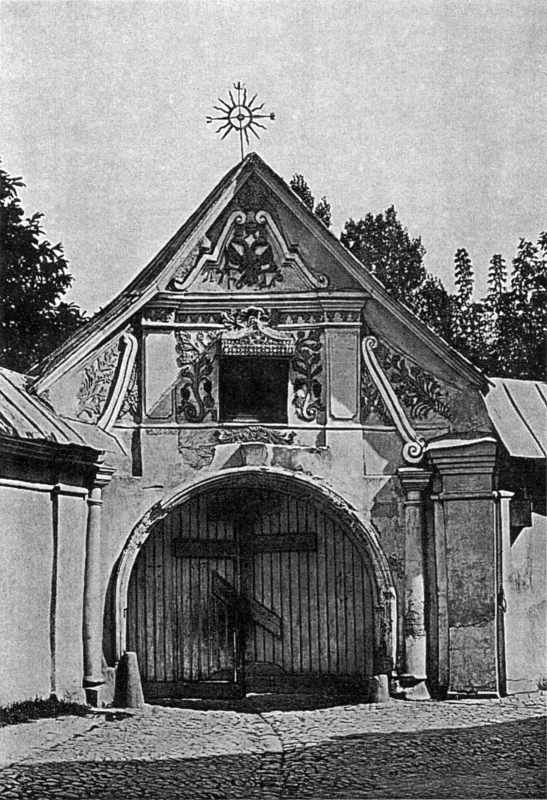
Economic Gate (1923)

==== Rebuilt bell tower ====
When excavated, the original foundations of the bell tower were discovered to be dilapidated, and the brick masonry was of indifferent quality. The foundations were therefore not used for the reconstructed building.

The architectural style of the rebuilt bell tower resembles the over-gate bell towers of the St Sophia's Cathedral and the Vydubychi Monastery. The floors are made with reinforced concrete. The structure is 48.28 metres (158.4 ft) tall. It was possible to reduce the thickness of the rebuilt walls from their original 3.0–4.0 metres (9.8–13.1 ft) to 0.51–0.77 metres (1 ft 8 in – 2 ft 6 in). The second tier, which is cubic, has four arches, and is narrower than the first tier, is narrower still, and has a chiming clock and four windows. The third tier, which is crowned with a gilded dome, The mechanism of the original clock was broken already by the middle of the 19th century. It never had dials, but in March 1998, dials were placed in the tower's clock.

On 14 May 2025, the tradition of bell ringing in St. Michael's Golden-Domed Monastery was inscribed on the National Inventory of Intangible Cultural Heritage of Ukraine.

== Cathedral artworks (pre-1935) ==
=== Interior elements ===
The ancient cathedral's most striking interior elements were its 12th–century frescoes and mosaics. In the 1880s, Prakhov formed a team of Kyiv artists, selected from the drawing school of the Ukrainian painter and art historian Mykola Murashko. In 1882, the team made copies of the cathedral mosaics; in 1884, the newly discovered mosaics of the dome and the triumphal arch were drawn; and in 1888, drawings of the previously unknown frescoes were made.

Few of the mosaics and frescoes escaped destruction when the cathedral was demolished. Some of those that survived were shown in 1935 at an exhibition "Religion in the Service of Feudal Exploiters" in the Kyiv-Pechersk Lavra. During the Second World War, those mosaics and frescoes not previously removed to Moscow by the Soviets were taken to Germany by the Nazis. After the end of the war, they were returned to the Soviet Union.

==== Frescoes ====
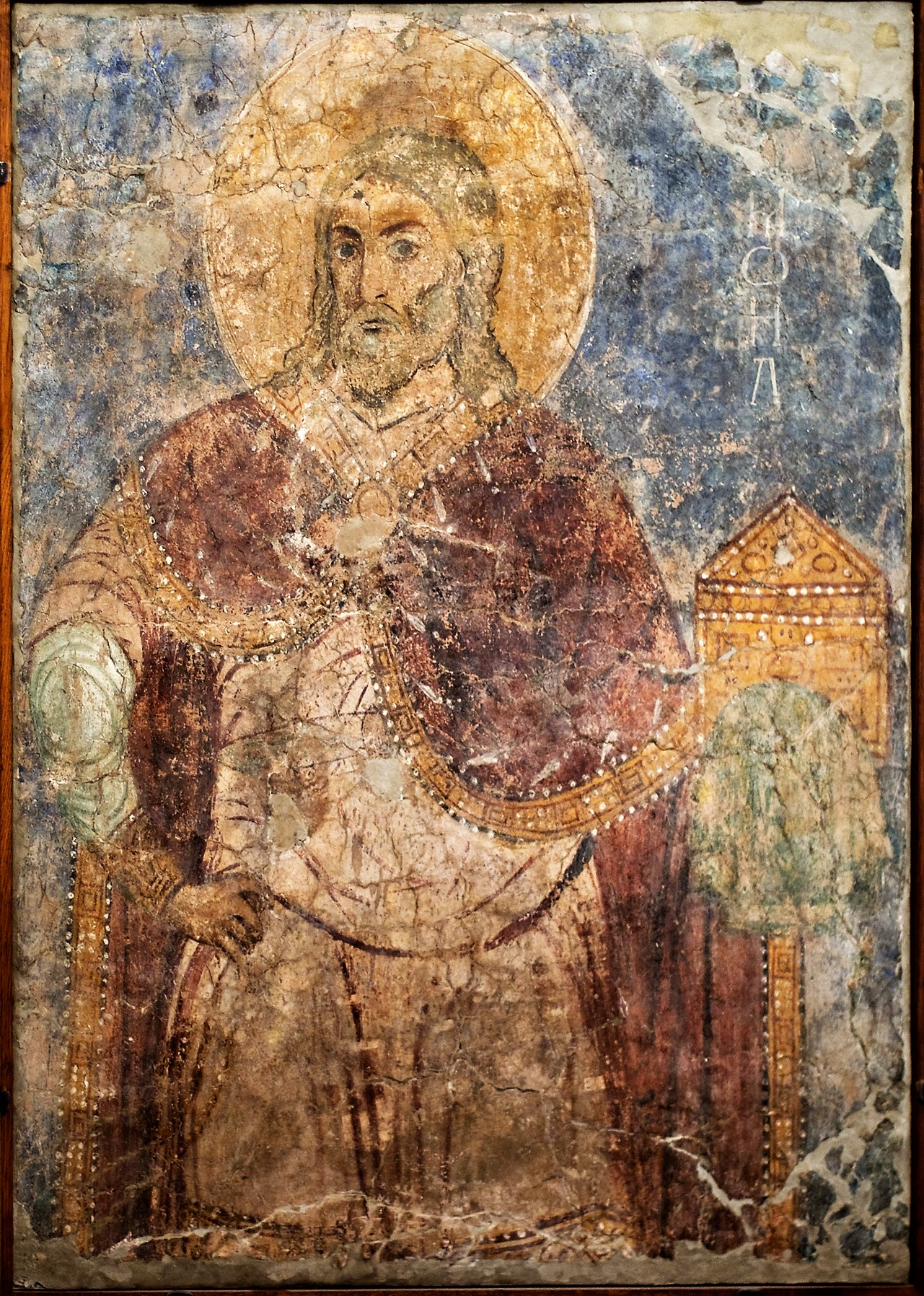
The fresco of Samuel, which once decorated the cathedral (c. 1112, Russian Museum)

From 1746 to 1754, during reconstruction work, subsidence in the aisles of the cathedral split the main dome into four, and the subsequent repair work caused irreparable damage to many of the frescoes. At the beginning of the 19th century, the interior of the cathedral was decorated using oil-based paints. In 1888, a number of 12th-century frescoes, previously hidden by other oil paintings, were discovered and cleaned by Prakhov. They were revealed hidden under layers of plaster after the iconostasis was dismantled. They were hidden again when the lower tiers of the iconostasis were reinstalled. In 1889, the frescoes above the iconostasis were painted over, having been left unretouched by Prakhov as a "keepsake for posterity".

Medallions were painted on the cathedral's pillars that depicted half-figures of Saint Sebastian along with names of the Forty Martyrs of Sebaste, images of St. Barbara, the archangel Gabriel, Mary, the high priest Zechariah, the prophet Samuel, and a small number of unnamed figures.

When the cathedral's mosaics were being removed in 1934, the frescoes were seen again. Some were taken away between June and mid-September that year; information about the means by which this was done is fragmentary. The work on removing them continued until August 1937, when the cathedral was destroyed. Those that had been taken were afterwards distributed among the museums of Kyiv and Moscow. As scaffolding was not installed prior to the cathedral being demolished, it is not thought any of the dome's frescoes were saved. Most of the Kyiv frescoes were taken to Germany during the war, which caused them to be damaged or lost. After the war the surviving works were returned to museums in Novgorod and Leningrad (now Saint Petersburg).

==== Mosaics ====
Above the main altar was a collection of mosaics depicting the Last Supper and the Apostles of Jesus. Paul of Aleppo described them he saw them in 1654:

The large Tabernacle resembles that of St Sophia, and of the Convent of Petcherske, and has three large windows; and, in like manner, it is painted in the centre with the portrait of Our Lady, standing upright in her gold ornaments, and having both her hands raised and open. Next to her is Our Lord, handing to his Disciples, on both sides, the divine bread and blood. Below them are the portraits of Chief Priests, in rows, and all with inscriptions.

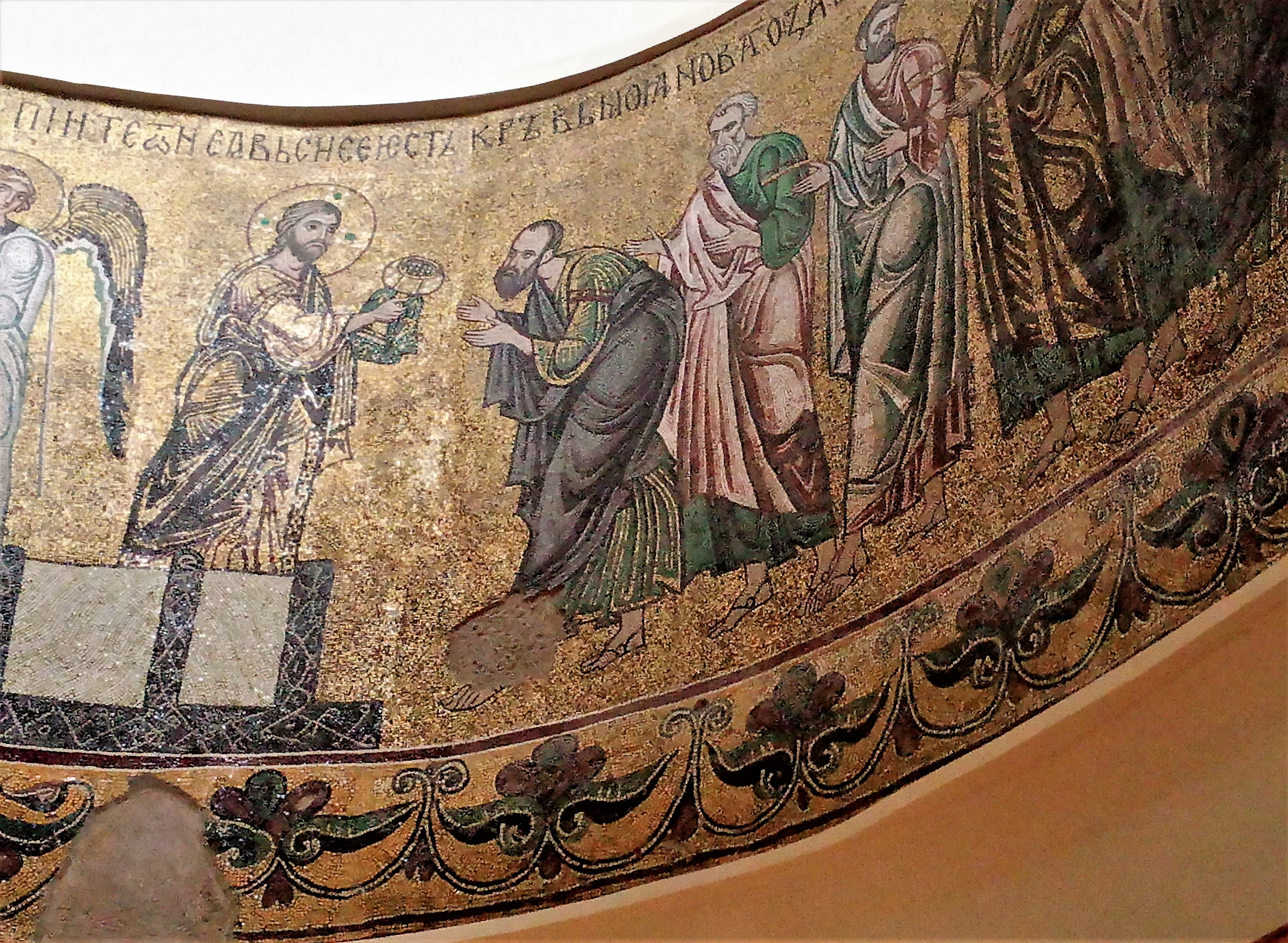
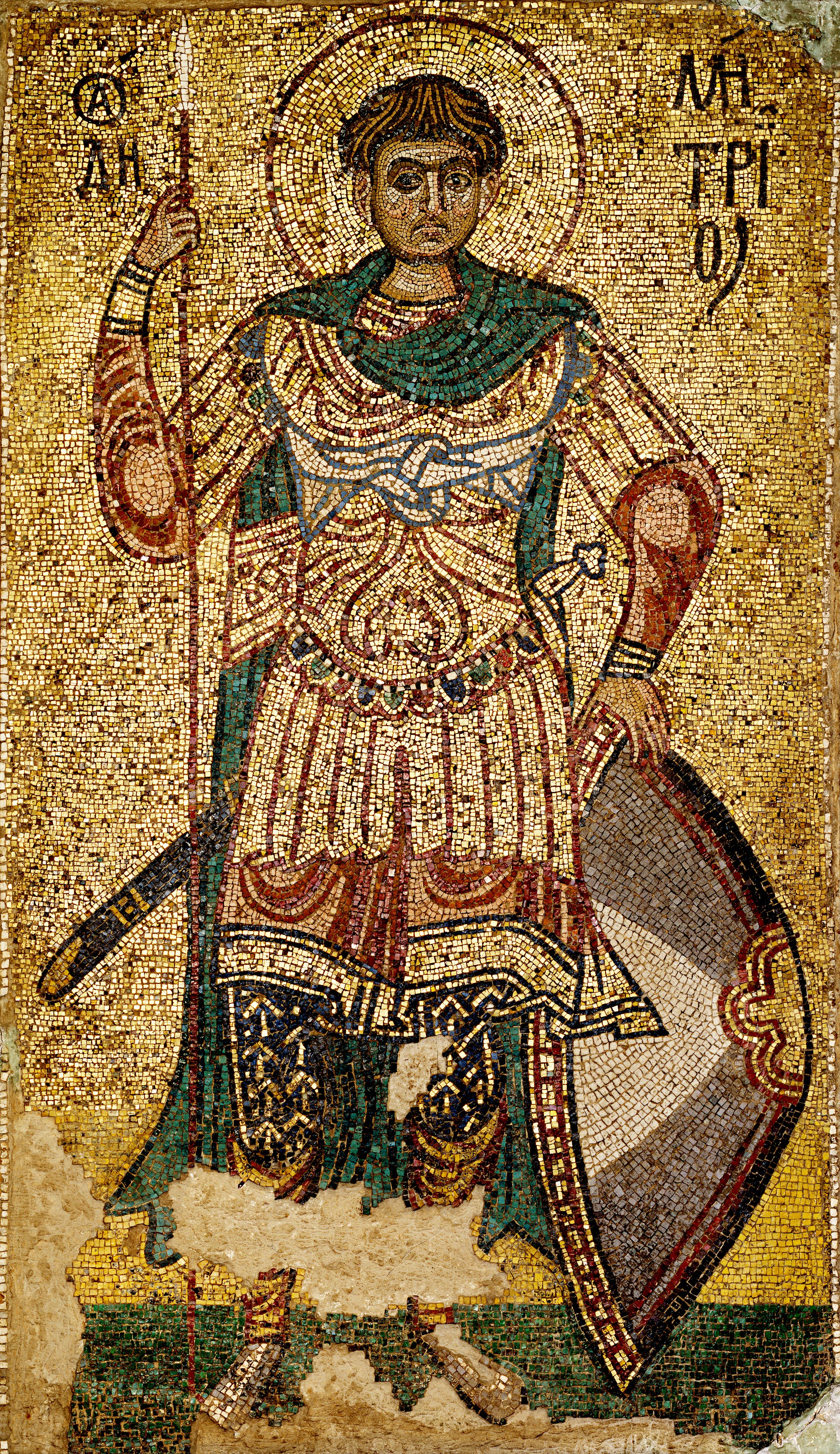
The Eucharist mosaic, installed on the second floor of the St Sophia Cathedral; the mosaic of St. Demetrius, installed by Sviatopolk II

The mosaics became so covered with dust and soot that many remained hidden and unrecorded until they were rediscovered by Prakhov. In 1888, with approval from the diocese, he cleaned them using a soap and oil mixture, and removed the dirt between the cubes using dough-like plaster patches. Prakhov's team made sketches of all the mosaics. Four large-format volumes of drawings and draft sketches were produced. His work attracted the interest of the art historian Nikodim Kondakov, who was largely responsible for initiating the systematic study of Rus' art. (Note: In 1888, Kondakov published his findings on the Russo-Byzantine monuments of Kyiv and Feodosia. The encyclopaedic Russkiia drevnosti v pamiatnikakh iskusstva (Russian Antiquities in Monuments of Art), written jointly by Kondakov and Ivan Ivanovich Tolstoy, was the first comprehensive history of medieval Russian art.) Kondakov identified a clear artistic shift from the "Greek" mosaics and frescoes of the St Sophia Cathedral to those of the Monastery of St. Michael, arguing that the figures at St. Michael's were more fluid than the static and stylised figures in St Sophia's. Kondakov concluded this was due to the influence of Russian craftsmen, who were employed in addition to the Byzantine masters.

In 1899, the art historian Dmitry Aynalov and the archaeologist Egor Redin noted the similarities between the mosaics depicting the Eucharist in St Sophia's Cathedral and St. Michael's: "The general character of the style is lower than the Sophian mosaic; there are disproportionately smaller heads, arms and legs; the draperies are tangled. Technically, the mosaic is distinguished by colourless tones; it is dominated by white and red cubes."

Besides the Eucharist mosaic, the only mosaics to have survived the demolition of the cathedral depict the figures of Saint Demetrius, Saint Stephen, and the Apostle Thaddeus. The mosaic of St. Demetrius was located on the southern edge of the north-eastern pillar, under the eastern arch of the main nave. In 1936, the mosaic was removed, set in cement, and taken to the Kyiv Museum of Russian Art. Some of the mosaics were deposited at the Tretiakov Gallery in Moscow and St Sophia's Cathedral. The items at St Sophia's were looted by the Nazis after they occupied Kyiv. After the end of the Second World War, they were returned by the Americans to the Soviet authorities. They were then reinstalled at St Sophia's.

=== Relics of St. Barbara ===
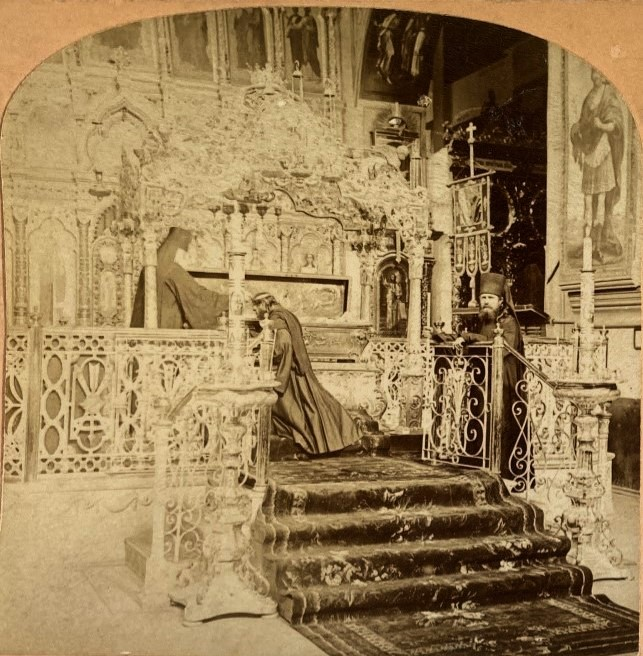
A photograph of the ceremonial kissing of the relics of St. Barbara

The monastery enjoyed the patronage of hetmans and other benefactors throughout the years. The chief attraction of the monastery for pilgrims were the relics of St. Barbara, alleged to have been brought to Kyiv from Constantinople in 1108 by the wife of Sviatopolk II. According to a tradition, St. Barbara's relics were hidden under the staircase when Kyiv was occupied by the Mongols. At one time, they were kept in a silver reliquary donated by Hetman Ivan Mazepa in 1701. Weighing 32 kilograms (71 lb), it represented the crowning achievement of Ukrainian jewellery-making. (Note: Starting from the late 17th century a song honouring St. Barbara was sung in the cathedral of the monastery on each Tuesday just before the liturgy.)

In 1870, about 100,000 pilgrims travelled to the monastery to see the relics. Before the Russian Revolution in 1917, rings manufactured and blessed by the monks, known as St. Barbara's rings, were very popular. They were said to bring good luck and protect the wearer against witchcraft, but were also considered effective against illness and sudden death.

The saint's relics were kept at various locations in the city after the monastery was destroyed. As of 2023, they are kept at St Volodymyr's Cathedral.

=== Iconostasis ===
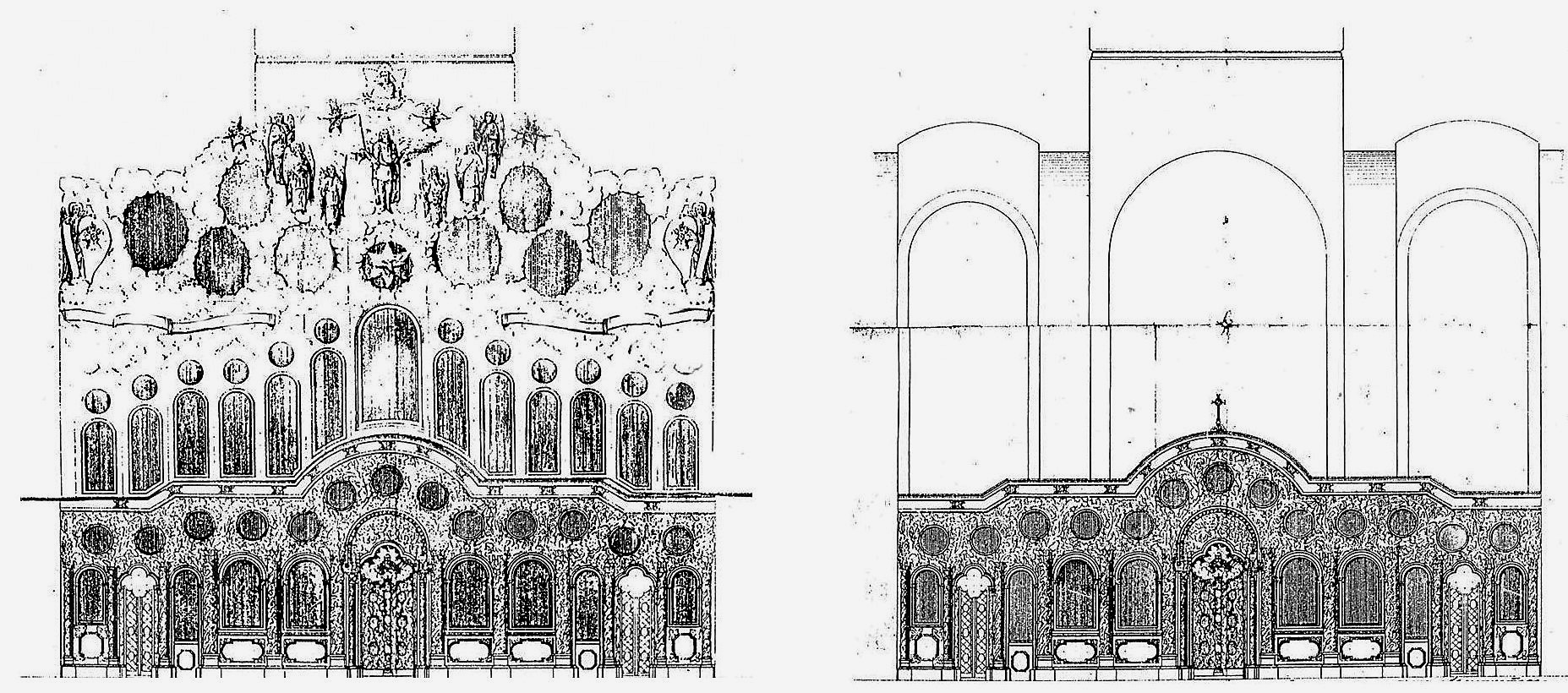
Volodymyr Nikolaev, drawings of the cathedral's iconostasis (left) as built in 1718; (right) as lowered in 1888

Behind the sepulchre was a wooden five-tiered gold and silver-gilt iconostasis, donated by the Cossack nobleman Ivan Skoropadsky in 1718. The iconostasis, which replaced the one installed in the cathedral in 1631, was made by the Chernihiv craftsman Hryhoriy Petrov, and had icons painted by the Kyiv priest Stefan Lubenskyi.

During renovation works in 1888, the iconostasis was planned to be replaced by a marble altar wall. Due to a lack of funds, the three upper tiers were removed, leaving the iconostasis in two tiers, as shown by a number of 20th-century photographs. A sketch of the iconostasis was made by Volodymyr Nikolaev, the architect responsible for its partial dismantling in the 1880s, and the complete iconostasis is partly visible in a 1851 drawing by Mazer.

The church historian Leonid Ivanovich Denisov, writing in 1908, described the iconostasis in the cathedral church as having a golden icon of St. Michael the Archangel, sprinkled with diamonds and other gems, that had been gifted to the church by Tsar Alexander I in 1817. The iconostasis was destroyed shortly before the cathedral was demolished.

=== Other notable artworks ===
Paul of Aleppo described the cathedral's tabernacle as it was when he saw it in 1654:

At the back of the left choir is a handsome tabernacle, facing your left-hand as you enter. It has an iron folding-door reaching from the top to the bottom, and beautifully divided into compartments, which are diversified with painted flowers and the figures of angels and saints, in the manner we described of St Sophia.

— Paul of Aleppo, The Travels of Macarius (translated from the original in 1829)

Other notable artworks in the cathedral included an icon of St. Barbara, adorned with stars, clasps and diamond rings, gifted by Anna and Elizabeth of Russia, a gold lamp set with pearls and diamonds, and five silver candlesticks commissioned by Hetman Mazepa in 1701.

== Books and documents ==
One of the achievements of the polymath Ivan Yakymovych Falkovskyi (1762–1863), who was head of the Kyiv Theological Academy, was to improve the monastery's library. As well as being the centre of the preservation of the city's historical manuscripts and books, the monastery provided for the spiritual and educational needs of the people of Kyiv. Falkovskyi catalogued the books and manuscripts, which he numbered and listed alphabetically. He also worked on renovating the books in the library. In the 1860s, a free reading room was opened for the public. The Soviets confiscated the library's books, and moved them to the National Library of the Ukrainian Academy of Sciences (now the National Library of Ukraine). Prior to the Soviet period, the monastery library contained 4,200 books.

The monastery's surviving collection of old books, numbering approximately 300 publications and 750 manuscripts, are now stored in the Vernadsky National Library of Ukraine. St. Michael's main library has more than 20,000 books.

== See also ==
- Architecture of Kievan Rus'

== Sources ==
=== In English ===
- Cross, Samuel H. (1947). "The Mosaic Eucharist of St. Michael's (Kiev)". The American Slavic and East European Review. 6 (1): 56–61. doi:10.2307/2491933. ISSN 0037-6779. JSTOR 2491933.
- D-Vasilescu, Elena Ene (2018). Heavenly Sustenance in Patristic Texts and Byzantine Iconography: Nourished by the Word. London: Palgrave Macmillan. ISBN 978-33199-8-986-0.
- Hewryk, Titus D. (1982). "The Monastery Of St. Michael Of The Golden Domes". The Lost Architecture of Kiev. New York: The Ukrainian Museum. ASIN B0006E9KPQ. Archived from the original on 12 January 2018.
- Ivashko, Yulia; Buzin, Ivan; Sandu, Ioan Gabriel; Kuśnierz-Krupa, Dominika; Kobylarczyk, Justyna; Dmytrenko, Andrii; Bednarz, Łukasz (2022). "State-of-the-Art Technologies of Imitation of Mural Painting from the Kyivan Rus and Baroque Periods in the Reconstructed St. Michael Golden-Domed Cathedral in Kyiv" (PDF). International Journal of Conservation Science (1): 147–162. ISSN 2067-533X.
- Klos, Vitaly (2019). St. Michael Golden-Domed Monastery Guidebook. Translated by Tkachova, Vitalina. St. Michael Golden-domed Monastery, Kyiv. OCLC 856055059.
- Orlenko, Mykola; Ivashko, Yulia; Kobylarczyk, Justyna; Kuśnierz-Krupa, Dominika (2022). "Study of foundations in Ukraine from the eleventh to eighteenth centuries and their preservation and conservation methods: Experiences" (PDF). Muzeológia a kultúrne dedičstvo [Museology and Cultural Heritage]. 10 (1): 33–51. doi:10.46284/mkd.2022.10.1.3. S2CID 247300670.
- Paul of Aleppo (1836). The travels of Macarius: Patriarch of Antioch. Vol. 1. Translated by Belfour, F.C. London: Oriental Translation Fund of Great-Britain and Ireland. OCLC 1157900987.
- Pavlovsky, V.; Zhukovsky, A. (1984). "St Michael's Golden-Domed Monastery". Encyclopedia of Ukraine. Vol. 4. Toronto: University of Toronto Press.
- Pevny, Olenka Z. (2010). "The Encrypted Narrative of Reconstructed Cossack Baroque Forms". Harvard Ukrainian Studies. 31 (1): 471–519. JSTOR 41756512.
- von Steblau, Erich; Wynar, Lubomyr R. (1975) [1866]. Wynar, Lubomyr R. (ed.). Habsburgs and Zaporozhian Cossacks: The Diary of Erich Lasspta von Steblau (1594) (PDF). Translated by Subtelny, Orest. Littleton, Colorado: Ukrainian Academic Press.
- Taroutina, Maria (2018). The Icon and the Square: Russian Modernism and the Russo-Byzantine Reviv. University Park, Pennsylvania: Penn State University Press. ISBN 978-02710-8-257-8.
- Vzdornov, Gerol'd I. (2017). The History of the Discovery and Study of Russian Medieval Painting. Brill Publishers. ISBN 978-90043-0-527-4.
- Watson, Noelle; Schellinger, Paul; Ring, Trudy, eds. (2013). Northern Europe: International Dictionary of Historic Places. Vol. 2. New York: Taylor & Francis. ISBN 978-1-884964-022.
- Whittaker, Cynthia Hyla (2010). Visualizing Russia: Fedor Solntsev and Crafting a National Past. Brill Publishers. ISBN 978-90041-9-185-3.
- Wilson, Andrew (2000). The Ukrainians: Unexpected Nation (4th ed.). New Haven, Connecticut: Yale University Press. ISBN 978-03002-1-725-4.

=== In Ukrainian ===
- Aynalov, Dmitry Vlasyevich; Redin, Egor Kuzmich (1899). "Древние памятники искусства Киева. Софийский собор, Златоверхо-Михайловский и Кирилловский монастыри" [Ancient monuments of art in Kiev. St Sophia Cathedral, Zlatoverkho-Mikhailovsky and St. Cyril's monasteries]. Proceedings of the Pedagogical Department of Kharkov. History and Philology Society (in Russian) (6).
- Cac, I.M. (2009). "Grekovich, Anthony". In Smoliy, V.A. (ed.). Енциклопедія історії України [Encyclopedia of the History of Ukraine] (in Ukrainian). Vol. 2. Kyiv: Institute of History of Ukraine. OCLC 1267399436.
- Chobit, Dmytro (2005). Mykhailivskyi Zolotoverkhyi Monastyr [St. Michael's Golden-Domed Monastery] (in Ukrainian). Prosvita. ISBN 978-966-7544-24-9.
- Ernst, Fyodor, ed. (1930). "кол. золотоверхо-михайлівський манастир [Zolotoverho-Mikhailiv Monastery]". Київ: Провідник [Kyiv: A Guide] (in Ukrainian). All-Ukrainian Academy of Sciences, Committee for the 10th Anniversary of the Ukrainian Academy of Sciences. pp. 361–375.
- Ivanyuk, I.A. (2013). "Культурно-Просвітницька Діяльність Єпископа Іринея Фальковського Із Упорядкування Книжкових Зібрань Бібліотеки Києво-Михайлівського Золотоверхого Монастиря" [Enlightenmental and cultural activity connected with regulation of collection of books in St. Michael's Golden-Domed Monastery library by bishop Irynei Falkovsky]. Scientific Journal of the Antiquities of Sums (in Ukrainian) (40). Sumy, Ukraine: Sumy State University: 145–149. ISSN 2311-5408.
- Klos, Vitaly (2013). "Київський Свято – Михайлівський Золотоверхий чоловічий монастир УПЦ КП" [Kyiv St. Michael's Golden-Domed Monastery of the Ukrainian Orthodox Church]. Encyclopedia of Modern Ukraine (in Ukrainian). Vol. 13. NASU Institute of Encyclopaedic Research. ISBN 978-966-02-2074-4.
- Makarov, A.N. (2002). Мала енциклопедія Київської старовини [Little Encyclopedia of Kyiv's Antiquities] (in Ukrainian). Kyiv: Dovira. ISBN 978-966-507-128-0.
- Olianina, Svitlana (2012). "Втрачені українські іконостаси доби гетьманщини в архівних зібраннях києва" [Lost Ukrainian Iconostases of the Age of the Hetmanate in the Archive Collections of Kyiv] (PDF). Museology and Munistology (in Ukrainian) (5). Institute of Cultural Studies of the National Academy of Sciences of Ukraine: 144–150.
- Perepeliuk, Olha (2021). "З Історії Хору Київського Михайлівського Золотоверхого Монастиря (ХIX — Початок ХX Століття)" [The History of the Kyiv Mykhailivskyi Zolotoverkhyi Monastery Choir (XIX — Early XX Centuries)] (PDF). Ethnological Notebooks (in Ukrainian). 5 (161). Lviv: Institute of Folklore of the National Academy of Sciences of Ukraine: 1261–1266. doi:10.15407/nz2021.05.1261. ISSN 1028-5091.
- Shevchenko, Valentina (1997). "Трапезна Михайлівського Золотоверхого монастиря" [The Refectory of the Mikhailovsky Golden-domed Monastery]. Пам'ятки України [Sights of Ukraine] (in Ukrainian). No. 1. Kyiv. pp. 46–51.

=== In Russian ===
- Denisov, Leonid Ivanovich (1908). Православные монастыри Россiйской Имперiи [Orthodox monasteries of the Russian Empire] (in Russian). Moscow: A. D. Stupin.
- Kivlytskyi, E. (1894). "Златоверхій Михайловскій муж- ской 1-го класса монастырь въ Кіевѣ" [St. Michael's Golden-Domed male 1st class monastery in Kyiv.]. Brockhaus and Efron Encyclopedic Dictionary (in Russian). Vol. 12A. St. Petersburg: Semenovskaya Typolitography (I.A. Efron).
- Korenyuk, Y. A. (2014). "Фрески Михайловского Златоверхого собора в Киеве [The Frescoes of St. Michael's Golden-Domed Cathedral in Kyiv]". В созвездии Льва. Сборник статей по древнерусскому искусству в честь Льва Исааковича Лифшица [In the Constellation Leo: A Collection of Articles on Ancient Russian Art in Honour of Leo Isaacovitch Lifshits] (PDF) (in Russian). Moscow: State Institute of Art. ISBN 978-5-98287-072-8.
- Yunakov, Oleg (2016). Architect Joseph Karakis (in Russian). Almaz. ISBN 978-1-68082-000-3.
