= Refectory Church of the Holy Apostle and Evangelist John the Theologian =

Refectory church of St. Michael's Golden-Domed Monastery, Kyiv

Coordinates: 50°27′21″N 30°31′22″E

- Храм святого апостола і євангелиста Іоана Богослова
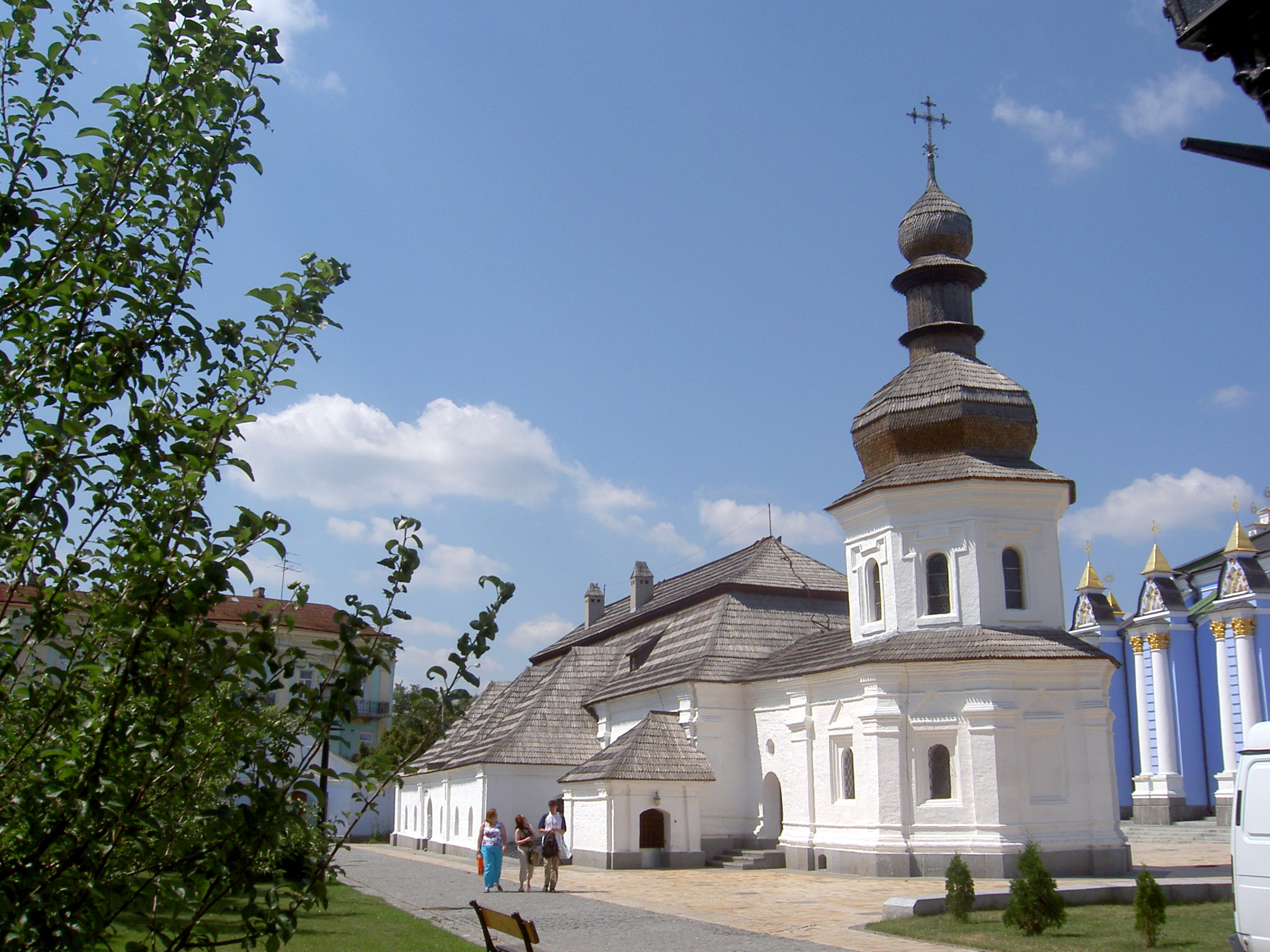
- View of the church bathed in bright sunlight
- Refectory Church of the Holy Apostle and Evangelist John the Theologian
- Address: St. Michael's Golden-Domed Monastery, Kyiv
- Country: Ukraine
- Denomination: Orthodox Church of Ukraine

History
- Dedication: John the Theologian

Architecture
- Architectural type: Refectory church
- Style: Ukrainian Baroque

Immovable Monument of National Significance of Ukraine
- Official name: Трапезна церква Михайлівського монастиря (Refectory Church of St. Michael's Monastery)
- Type: Architecture
- Reference no.: 260075-Н

The Refectory Church of the Holy Apostle and Evangelist John the Theologian (Ukrainian: Трапезна церква Святого Апостола і Євангелиста Іоана Богослова, romanized: Trapezna tserkva Sviatoho Apostola i Yevanhelysta Ioana Bohoslova) is the refectory church of St. Michael's Golden-Domed Monastery, in the Ukrainian capital Kyiv. The church is dedicated to John the Theologian.

== History ==
The Church of the Holy Apostle and Evangelist John the Theologian was built in 1713. It was built from the bricks of the Simeon Church, which was located in Kudryavka and burned down in 1676. In 1827, the church was restored, and in 1837 the interior of the church was decorated with paintings. In 1894, the bathhouse was gilded. The church was badly damaged by fire in 1904.

In 1922, the church was transformed into a student dining hall, which is why it was preserved and was not destroyed by the Bolsheviks, like other buildings within the precinct the St. Michael's Golden-Domed Monastery.

The church was the first building of the monastery to be restored, and in 1990 became one of the first churches in Kyiv where services were conducted in Ukrainian.

Since 1991, it has been the cathedral of the Ukrainian Autocephalous Orthodox Church. Since June 1992, it has belonged to the Ukrainian Orthodox Church of the Kyiv Patriarchate.

St. Michael's Monastery was reopened in 1992, John the Theologian became the church of the Kyiv Orthodox Theological Academy and Seminary. The church's walls have ancient whitewashed paintings. During the Revolution of Dignity, the church was used as an improvised hospital.
