= Demolition of St. Michael's Golden-Domed Monastery =

1935-1936 destruction of the St. Michael's Golden-Domed Monastery in Kyiv

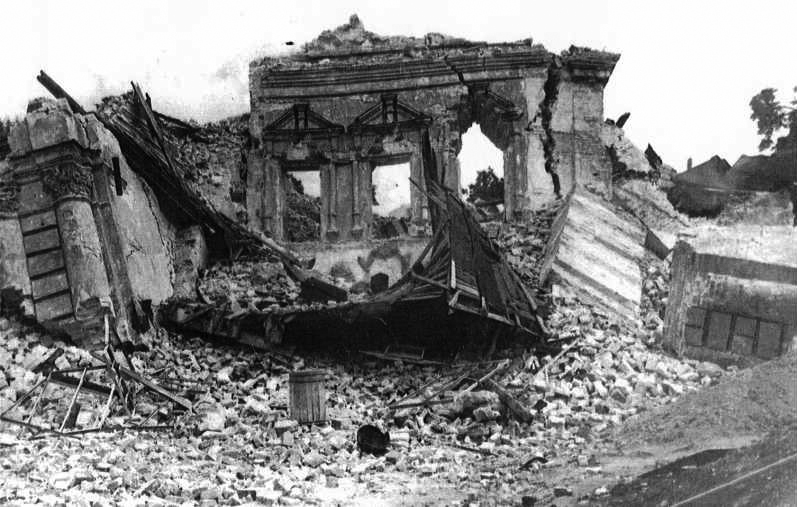
The ruins of the destroyed cathedral

The demolition of St. Michael's Golden-Domed Monastery by dynamite took place on 14 August 1937. The bell tower, the Economic Gate (Ekonomichna Brama) and the monastery's walls were also destroyed.

The Soviet authorities afterwards commissioned a competition how to best fill the empty plot. A new administration complex was planned, but only the building of the Central Committee of the Communist Party of Ukraine was constructed, a building that now houses the Ukrainian Ministry of Foreign Affairs.

== Proposals ==
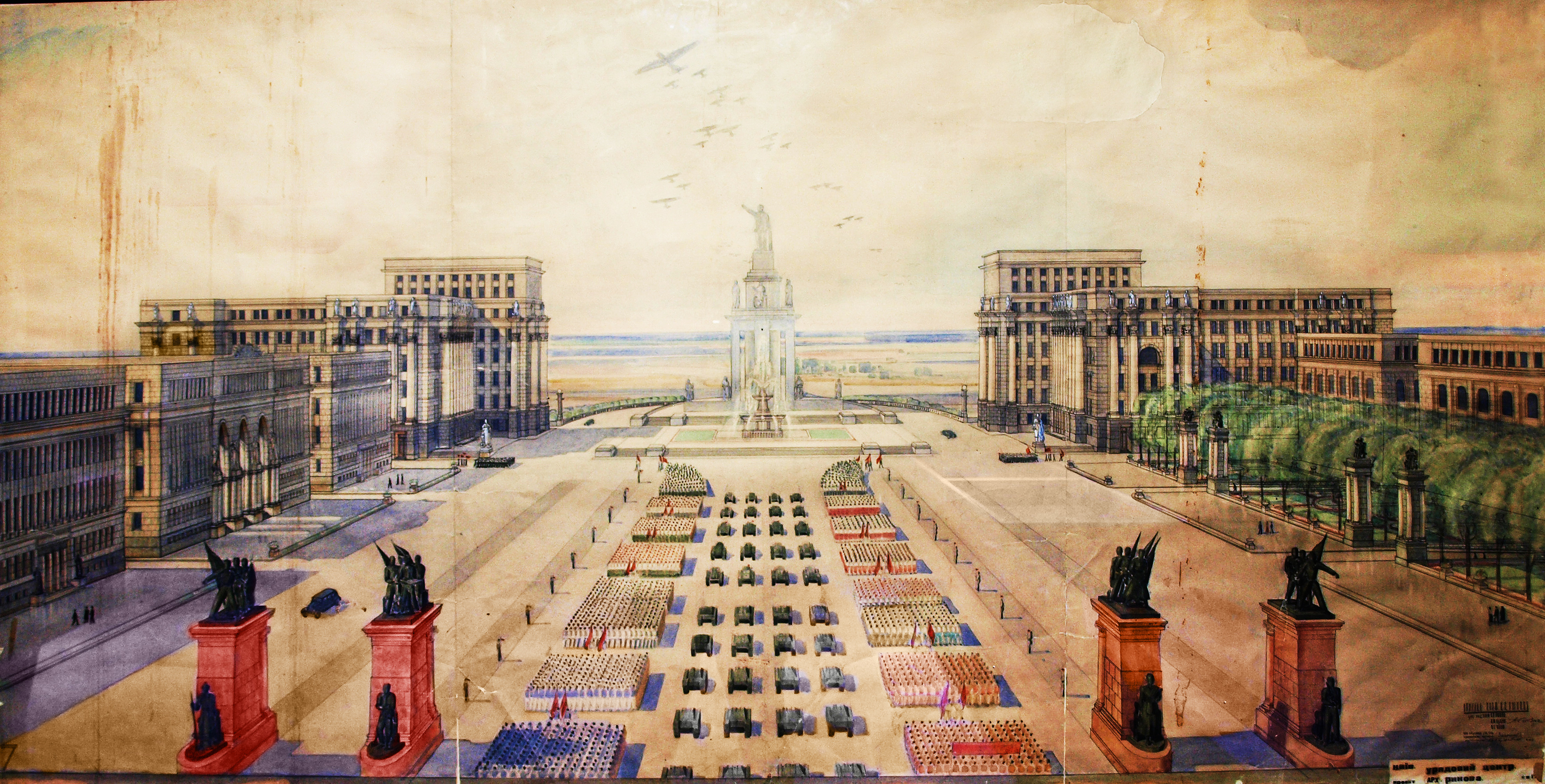
A submission by the Ukrainian architect Valerian Rykov for the planned Government Centre (1935)

During the first half of the 1930s, various Soviet publications questioned the known historical facts regarding the age of St. Michael's Golden-Domed Monastery. The publications stressed that the medieval building had undergone major reconstructions and that little of the original Byzantine-style cathedral was preserved. This wave of questioning sought to justify the demolition of the monastery and its replacement with a new administrative centre for the Ukrainian SSR (previously located in the city of Kharkiv). Before its demolition (8 June – 9 July 1934), the structure was carefully studied by Teodosy Movchanivskyi and K. Honcharev from the recently purged and re-organized Institute of Material Culture of the Ukrainian Academy of Sciences. On the basis of their survey, the cathedral was declared to belong primarily to the Ukrainian Baroque style, rather than to the 12th century as was previously thought, and thus did not merit preservation due to its alleged lack of historical and artistic value. This conclusion backed up the Soviet authorities' plans to demolish the entire monastery. Local historians, archaeologists, and architects agreed to the monastery's demolition, although reluctantly. One professor, Mykola Makarenko, who refused to sign the demolition act, later died in a Soviet prison. (Note: There is a memorial plate dedicated to him, hanging on the monastery's walls.)

In 1934 Soviet authorities decided to hold a competition for the project of the Governmental Centre with a place for parades. In all of the projects submitted for the location in the area of Bogdan Khmelnitsky Square, the St. Michael's Golden-domed Cathedral was demolished, except for one. The project of Joseph Karakis was the only one of four projects submitted for the competition with the location of the centre in this place, in which the St. Michael's Golden-domed Cathedral and the monument to Bogdan Khmelnitsky were preserved. However, at the end of the first round, the project of architect Peter Yurchenko was selected by the authorities as the most appropriate.

This project, according to the architect Boris Erofalov, "was repeating the general scheme of the Karakis, but was done in a more frontal approach, with the liquidation of the St. Michael's Golden-Domed Cathedral. And if the location of the main volumes of the Karakis is asymmetric…" In March 1934, authorities decided to abandon the previous decision and announce a new competition, and at the end to choose the project of architect Joseph Langbard. Meanwhile, according to Oleg Yunakov's research based on archive documents, it is clear that although there is no cathedral in the projects of J. Langbard and P. Yurchenko, that was not the reason for the demolition, since the decision to demolish the monastery was adopted by the resolution of the Politburo in February 1934, and the dismantling of mosaics began to be produced already in 1933.

== Removal of the mosaics prior to demolition ==
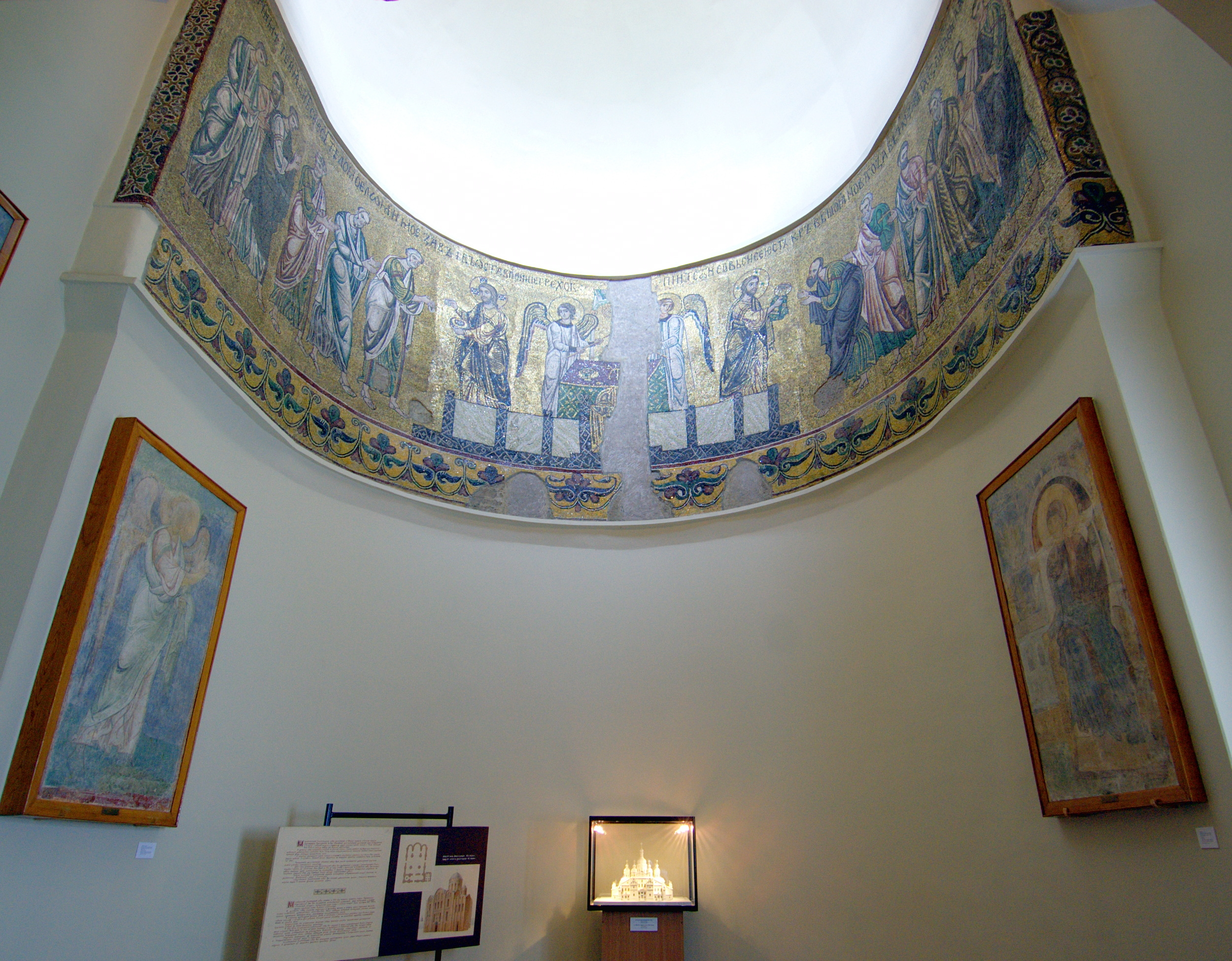
The Eucharist mosaic, installed on the second floor of the Saint Sophia Cathedral

On 27 March 1934, the Politburo of the Central Committee of the Communist Party of Ukraine made the decision to remove the most important mosaics and frescoes, and then demolish the monastery. On 26 June, under the supervision of Vladimir Frolov of the Leningrad Academy of Arts, work began on the removal of the 12th-century Byzantine mosaics. They were apportioned among the State Hermitage Museum, the Tretyakov Gallery, and the State Russian Museum. The removals were done by the Mosaic Section of the Leningrad Academy of Fine Arts. Specialists were forced to work in haste on account of the impending demolition and were thus unable to complete the entire project. Despite the care and attention shown during the removal of the mosaics from the cathedral's walls, the relocated mosaics cannot be relied upon as being absolutely authentic.

The remaining mosaics, covering an area of 45 square metres (485 sq ft), were apportioned among the State Hermitage Museum, the Tretyakov Gallery, and the State Russian Museum.

== Demolition ==
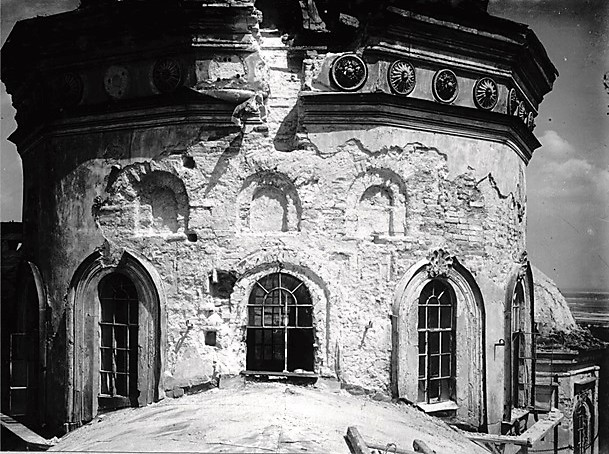
The cathedral shortly before its demolition

During the spring of 1935, the golden domes of the monastery were pulled down. The cathedral's silver royal gates, Mazepa's reliquary—weighing two poods of silver—and other valuables were sold abroad or simply destroyed.

The monastery was then systematically demolished. During the spring of 1935, the golden domes of the cathedral were dismantled, and its iconostasis gates, the silver reliquary for the relics of St Barbara, and other valuables were sold abroad or destroyed. The bell tower was destroyed between 1934 and 1935, followed by the Economic Gate and the monastery's outer walls (1936–1937). The bishop's house and farm buildings were dismantled in 1936. The shell of the cathedral was dynamited on 14 August 1937.

After the demolition, a thorough search for valuables was carried out by the NKVD on the site. The resulting empty plot was joined with Sofiyivska Square, renamed Uryadova Square (Governmental Square) and was designated as the new city centre and parade grounds. Soviet authorities then commissioned a competition how to best fill the empty plot; most architects, including Yakiv Shteinberg, suggested a huge Lenin statue. The square itself was planned as a rectangle with huge governmental buildings on the perimeter. Four pillars were planned with statues of workers, peasants and revolutionaries with flags standing on them. Some architects suggested demolishing the statue of Bohdan Khmelnytsky in front of the Saint Sophia Cathedral and the Cathedral itself.

== Sources ==
- Hewryk, Titus D. (1982). "The Monastery Of St. Michael Of The Golden Domes" (PDF). The Lost Architecture of Kyiv. New York: The Ukrainian Museum. ASIN B0006E9KPQ.
- Klos, Vitaly (2013). "Київський Свято – Михайлівський Золотоверхий чоловічий монастир УПЦ КП" [Kyiv St. Michael's Golden-Domed Monastery of the Ukrainian Orthodox Church]. Encyclopedia of Modern Ukraine (in Ukrainian). Vol. 13. NASU Institute of Encyclopaedic Research. ISBN 978-966-02-2074-4.
- Malikenaite, Ruta (2003), Touring Kyiv (in Ukrainian), Baltija Dryk, ISBN 978-966-96041-3-2
- Yunakov, Oleg (2016). Architect Joseph Karakis (in Russian). Almaz. ISBN 978-1-68082-000-3.
