= Dmitry Aynalov =

Russian art historian (1862–1939)

- Дмитрий Власьевич Айналов
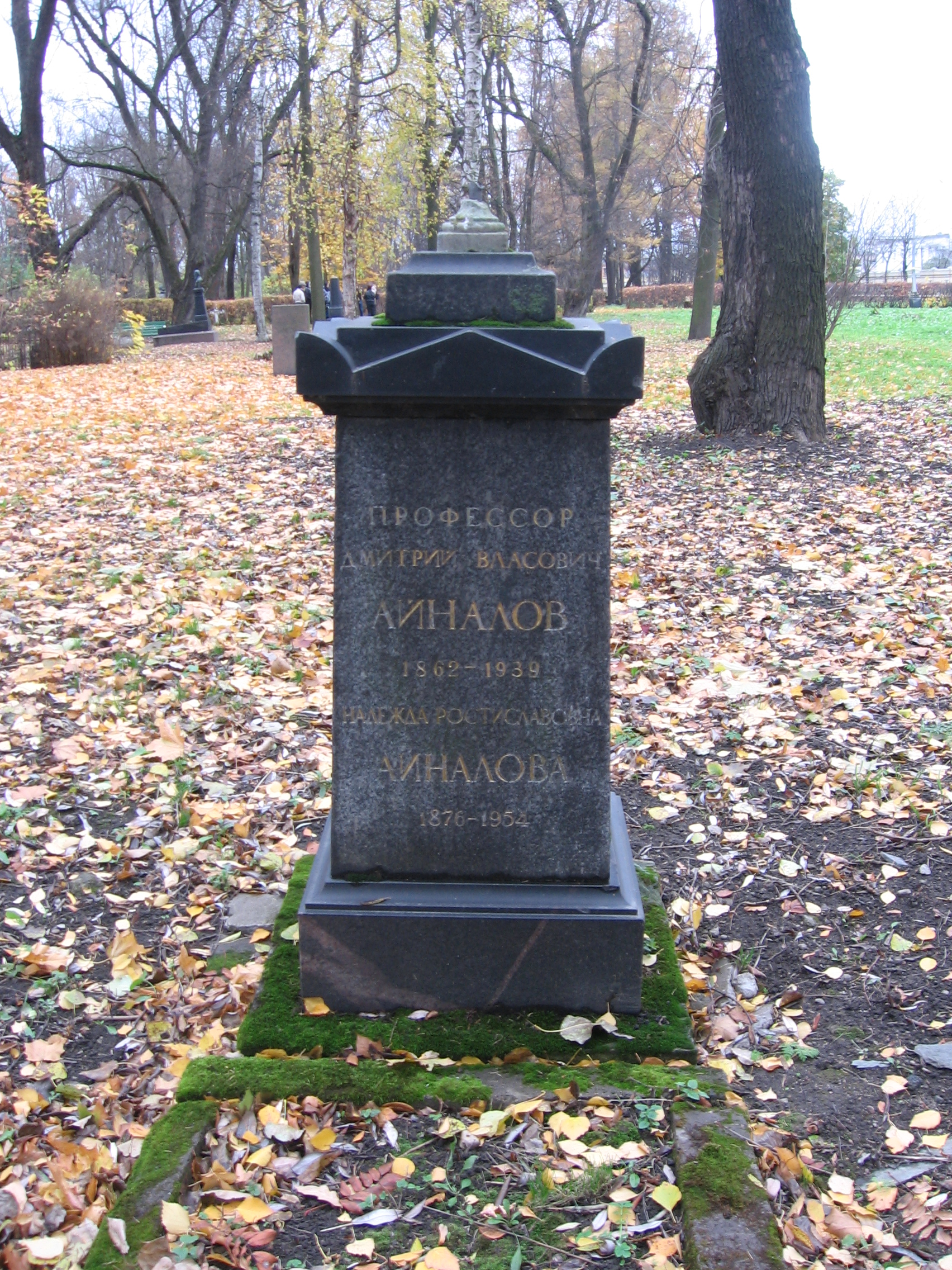
- Aynalov's tombstone at the Volkovo Cemetery
- Born: February 20, 1862 (8 February O.S.); Mariupol, Russian Empire
- Died: December 12, 1939 (aged 77); Leningrad, USSR
- Resting place: Volkovo Cemetery
- Education: Novorossiya University
- Occupations: art historian, a corresponding member of the Saint Petersburg Academy of Sciences
- Employer: Saint Petersburg State University
- Spouse: Nadezhda Aynalova (1876—1954)

Dmitry Vlasyevich Aynalov (Russian: Дми́трий Вла́сьевич Айна́лов, IPA: [ˈdmʲitrʲɪj ˈvlasʲjɪvʲɪtɕ ɐjˈnaləf]; 20 February [O.S. 8 February] 1862 – 12 December 1939) was a Soviet and Russian art historian, a university professor, a corresponding member of the Saint Petersburg Academy of Sciences (1914), and a member of the Imperial Orthodox Palestine Society. He penned more than 200 scholarly publications, including articles, lectures, reviews.

== Early life ==
Aynalov was born in Mariupol, Yekaterinoslav Governorate, on 20 February (8 February O.S.) 1862 in the family of a tradesman, Vlasiy Dmitrievich Aynalov. His father was of Greek descent. Dmitry Aynalov graduated from Mariupol Gymnasium in 1884 and then entered the History and Philology Department of the Novorossiya University in Odessa. He majored in art history and studied under the prominent art critic and archaeologist Nikodim Kondakov. He completed his student thesis in collaboration with Yegor Redin on the topic of the painting of the Saint Sophia Cathedral. It was published in Saint Petersburg in 1889.

== Career ==
After graduation in 1888, Dmitry Aynalov was assigned to the Saint Petersburg State University. For two years he was preparing to become a full professor in the field of art theory and art history. He accepted the position of an assistant professor at the Kazan University. In 1890-1903 he taught art history of the Classical antiquity and Kievan Rus' at that university's Department of Art Theory and Art History. He visited Italy in order to collect material for his dissertation, entitled The Hellenistic Foundations of the Byzantine Art. He explored the works of art and monuments of Rome, Venice, Naples, Palermo, Parma, Florence and visited other Italian towns. After five years of work he successfully defended the dissertation on 27 November 1895.

From 11 July 1903 he was a professor at the Saint Petersburg State University. He also taught at the Bestuzhev Courses from 5 December 1906. On November 29, 1914 he became a corresponding member at the Academy of Sciences, the Russian Language and Literature Department. By this time he had gained many awards, which earned him the rights to nobility. From 1922-1929 he worked at the Hermitage Museum.

Aynalov had an interest in archaeology. As a member of the Russian Archaeological Society, he took part in meetings and fulfilled various requests, e.g. in 1904-1905 as requested by the Moscow Archaeological Society he studied the church architecture of Chernigov. He was particularly interested in Chersonesus and the Crimean Peninsula architecture.

He retired in 1929 due to health issues. In the 1930s Aynalov was arrested, but later rehabilitated. He died in Leningrad in 1939, and was buried at the Volkovo Cemetery with his spouse Nadezhda.

== Publications ==
- Saint Sophia's Cathedral in Kiev (Russian: Киевский Софийский собор), 1890; in collaboration with Yegor Redin
- The Hellenistic Foundations of Byzantine Art (Russian: Эллинистические основы византийского искусства), 1900
- The Christian Chersonesus Monuments (Russian: Памятники христианского Херсонеса), 1901
- Études in the History of Renaissance Art (Russian: Этюды по истории искусства Возрождения), 1908
- Sketches and Notes on Kievan Rus' Art History (Russian: Очерки и заметки по истории древнерусского искусства), 1914
- History of Kievan Rus' Art (Russian: История древнерусского искусства), 1915
- Byzantine Paintings of the 14th century (Russian: Византийская живопись XIV века), 1917
- Études about Leonardo da Vinci (Russian: Этюды о Леонардо да Винчи), 1939
