= Ivan Yizhakevych =

Ukrainian painter

Ivan Sydorovych Yizhakevych (Ukrainian: Іва́н Си́дорович Їжаке́вич; January 18, 1864 – January 19, 1962) was a Soviet and Ukrainian painter and writer. One of the most popular Ukrainian artists, in 1951 he was awarded the title People's Painter of the Ukrainian SSR.

== Life ==
Yizhakevych was born in the village of Vyshnopil, in the vicinity of Uman, Kiev Governorate (modern Ukraine ). He was educated at the icon painting workshop of Kyiv Pechersk Lavra and between 1882 and 1884 studied at the M. Murashko School of Art in Kyiv. From 1884 and 1888 Yizhakevych attended the St. Petersburg Academy of Arts.

In 1907 Yizhakevych returned to Kyiv, where he stayed until the end of his life, continuing his work as artist and for a short period engaged in teaching. He died in 1962.

== Works ==
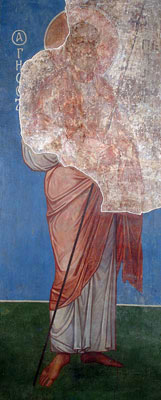
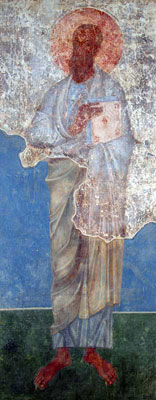
Saint Peter and Paul the Apostle, St. Cyril's Church, Kyiv (1884)

Yizhakevych's paintings reflect themes from Ukrainian history, such as Kyi, Shchek and Khoryv, Cossack battles, and Haidamaky. Yizhakevych also illustrated works by Ukrainian writers, among them Kobzar by Taras Shevchenko, The Forest Song by Lesya Ukrainka, Eneida by Ivan Kotliarevsky, Boryslav Stories by Ivan Franko.

Yizhakevych made numerous artistic contributions to Kyiv churches, working on the restoration of frescoes at the St. Cyril's Church in Kyiv and decorating the Refectory Church of Kyiv Pechersk Lavra. Between 1884 and 1917 many reproductions of Yizhakevych's works related to Ukrainian history and culture were published in Niva magazine.

Many of Yizhakevych's paintings are dedicated to Ukrainian religious traditions, history of the Cossacks and haidamaks. He also created a series of views of Kyiv. His later works are closer to Soviet style.

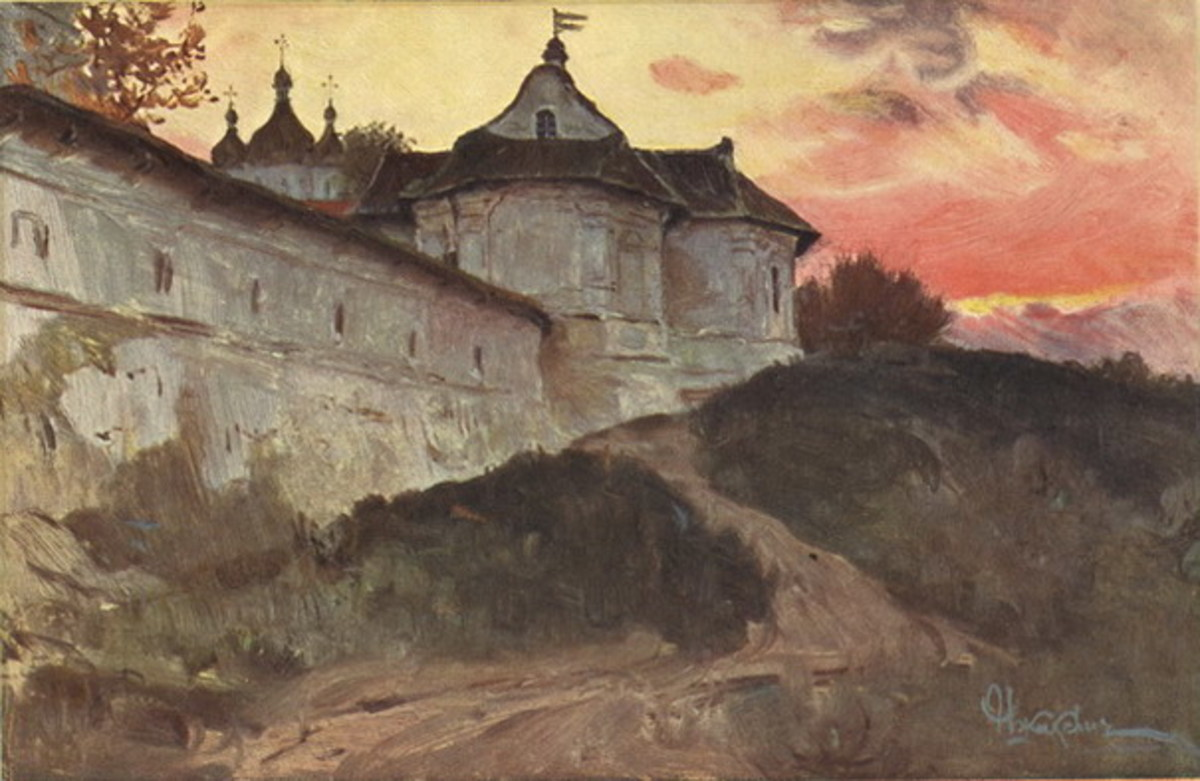
Mazepa's Tower in Pechersk

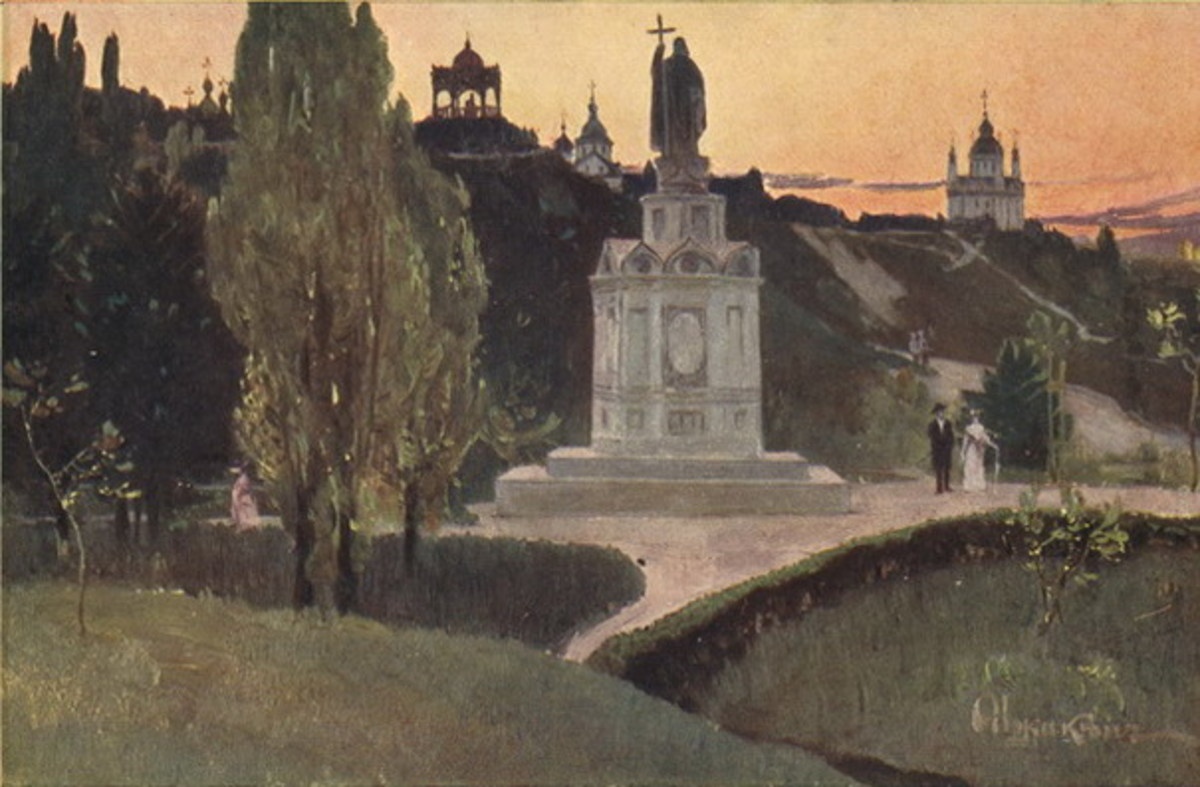
Saint Volodymyr Hill

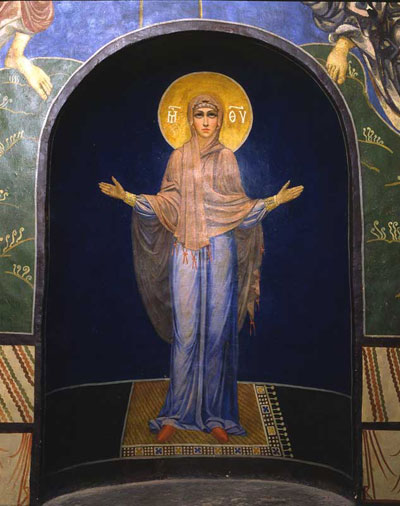
Orans at St. Cyril's Church, Kyiv (1884)

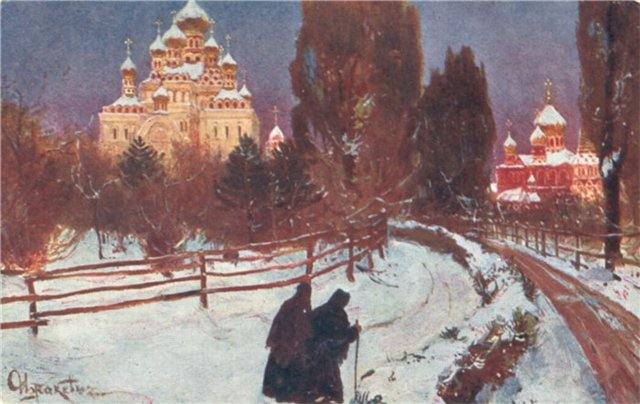
Intercession Monastery

== See also ==
- Icon painting in Ukraine
