= Refectory Church, Kyiv Pechersk Lavra =

Coordinates: 50.4348°N 30.5581°E

Refectory Church
- Трапезний собор Антонія і Феодосія Печерських
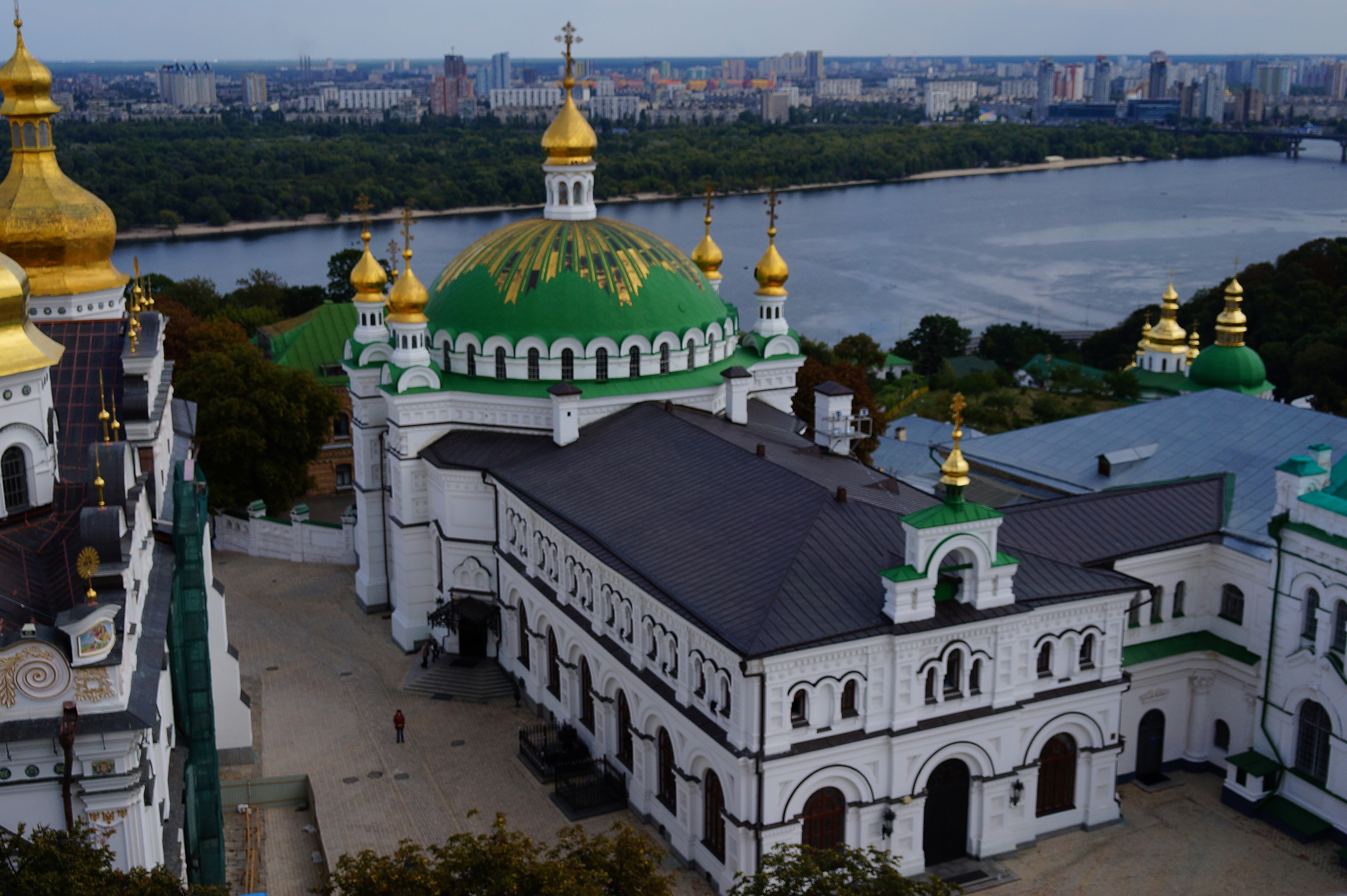
- The Refectory Church of the Kyiv Pechersk Lavra in Kyiv, Ukraine.
- Refectory Church
- Location: Kyiv, Ukraine
- Denomination: Ukrainian Orthodox Church (Moscow Patriarchate)

Architecture
- Architect: V. N. Nikolayev
- Groundbreaking: 1893
- Completed: 1895

Immovable Monument of National Significance of Ukraine
- Official name: Трапезна (Refectory)
- Type: Architecture
- Reference no.: 260088/26

The Refectory Church (Ukrainian: Трапезний собор Антонія і Феодосія Печерських, romanized: Trapeznyi sobor Antoniia i Feodosiia Pecherskykh; Russian: Трапезная церковь, romanized: Trapeznaya tserkov) is a building composed of a refectory and an adjoining church of Saint Anthony and Theodosius of the medieval cave monastery of Kyiv Pechersk Lavra in Kyiv, the capital of Ukraine. In the refectory, the Lavra monks had their meals.

The building was constructed in 1893–1895 at a time when more than a thousand monks were living within the monastery. The new refectory replaced a previous that existed since 17th century.

The building of the church is built in Russo-Byzantine style. The sturdy dome of the church incorporates some aspects of ancient Byzantium. The interior decoration of the building was designed by Aleksey Shchusev. The marble icons are in the Neo-Russian style. The paintings in both the refectory and the church, painted in the beginning of the 20th century by Ivan Yizhakevych, G. Popov, among many others, contain a Modernist influence. In the rear of the refectory is viewing area, providing visitors with a panorama of the Near and Far Caverns, the Dnieper River, and the left-bank of the city.

In 1911 following the assassination of Pyotr Stolypin, the Russian politician's funeral service was held in the Refectory church and his grave is located in the Lavra.

In the 2022 Russian invasion of Ukraine, the continued use of the church by the Ukrainian Orthodox Church (Moscow Patriarchate) has been questioned, as the lease expired on 31 December 2022.

== See also ==
- Category:Burials at the Refectory Church, Kyiv Pechersk Lavra
