= Kyiv Pechersk Lavra =

Historic Eastern Orthodox Christian monastery in Kyiv

- Києво-Печерська лавра
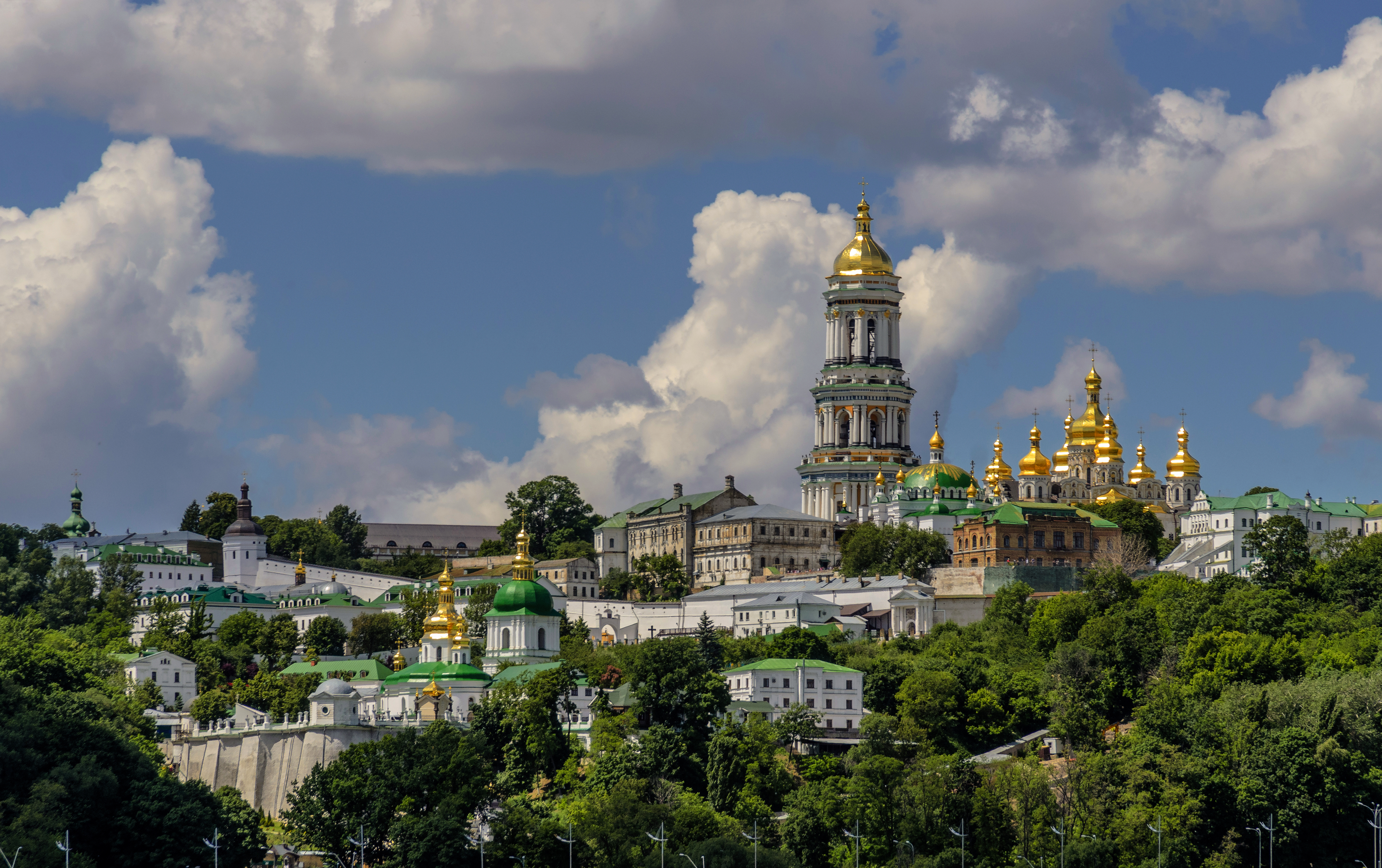
- View of the Kyiv Pechersk Lavra

- Location within Ukraine
- Kyiv Pechersk Lavra
- 50°26′3″N 30°33′33″E
- Location: Pechersk Raion, Kyiv
- Country: Ukraine
- Denomination: Eastern Orthodox
- Website: Official website

History
- Dedication: Monastery of the Caves

Architecture
- Architect(s): Theodosius of Kyiv, Anthony of Kyiv
- Style: Ukrainian Baroque
- Years built: 1051

Administration
- Diocese: Disputed

UNESCO World Heritage Site
- Official name: Kyiv-Pechersk Lavra
- Location: Europe
- Part of: Kyiv: Saint-Sophia Cathedral and Related Monastic Buildings, Kyiv-Pechersk Lavra
- Criteria: i, ii, iii, iv
- Reference: 527
- Inscription: 1990 (14th Session)
- Endangered: 2023

Immovable Monument of National Significance of Ukraine
- Official name: Ансамбль Києво-Печерської Лаври (Ensemble of Kyiv-Pechersk Lavra)
- Type: Urban Planning, Architecture
- Reference no.: 260088

The Kyiv Pechersk Lavra (Ukrainian: Києво-Печерська лавра, romanized: Kyievo-Pecherska Lavra), also known as the Kyiv Monastery of the Caves, is a historic lavra or large monastery of Eastern Christianity that gave its name to the Pecherskyi District where it is located in Kyiv.

Since its foundation as a cave monastery during the 11th century, the Lavra has been a preeminent center of Eastern Christianity in Eastern Europe. Its printing house was an early part of the development of printing in Ukraine.

== Etymology and other names ==
Ukrainian: печера, romanized: pechera means lit. cave, which in turn derived from Proto-Slavic *реktera with the same meaning. Ukrainian: лавра, romanized: lavra is used to describe high-ranking male monasteries for monks of the Eastern Orthodox Church. Therefore, the name of the monastery is also translated as Kyiv Cave Monastery, Kyiv Caves Monastery or the Kyiv Monastery of the Caves (from Ukrainian: на печерах).

== History ==
=== Foundation and early history ===
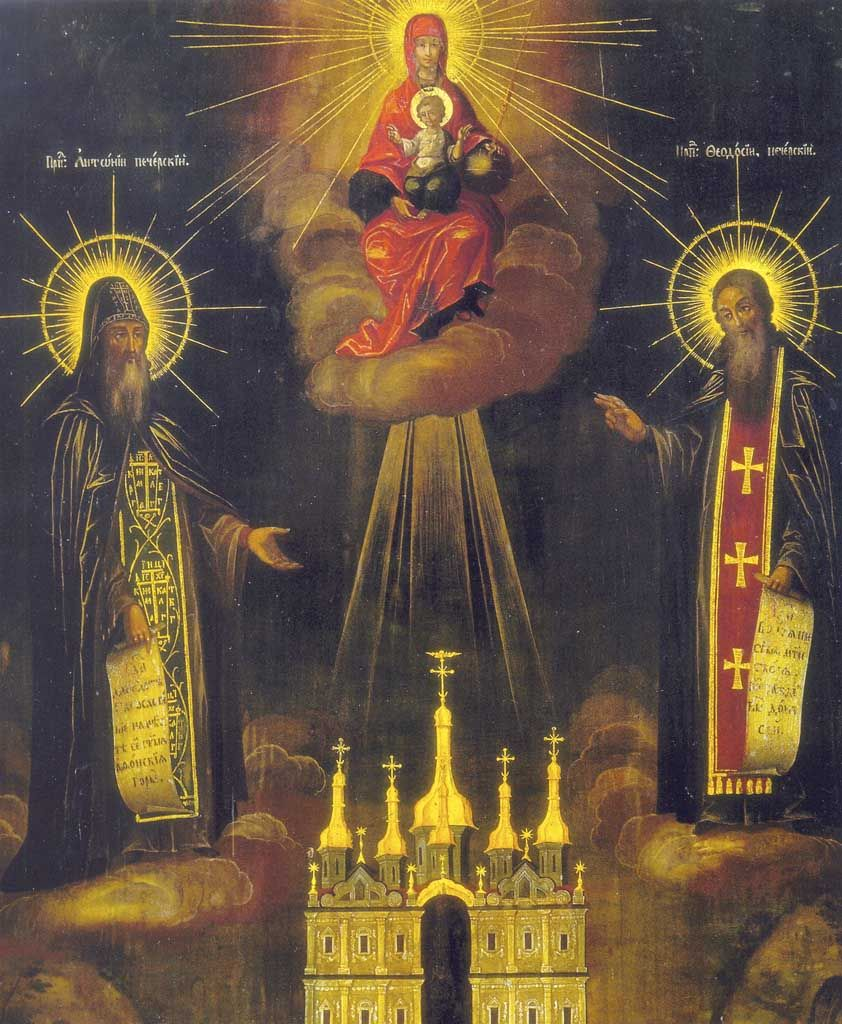
Icon of Saints Anthony and Theodosius, founders of Kyiv Pechersk Lavra

The Primary Chronicle contains contradictory information as to when the monastery was founded: in 1051, or in 1074. Anthony, a monk on Mount Athos, originally from Liubech of the Principality of Chernigov, returned to Rus' and settled in Kyiv as a missionary of monastic tradition to Kyivan Rus'. He chose a cave at the Berestov Mount that overlooked the Dnipro river, where metropolitan Hilarion had reportedly resided during his youth, and a community of disciples soon grew. Prince Iziaslav I of Kyiv (1024–1078) ceded the whole mount to the Anthonite monks who founded a monastery built by architects from Constantinople.

Supported by numerous princes and boyars, the monastery served as the most important centre of religion and culture in Rus'. Its monks produced important works of literature, including the Primary Chronicle and Kyiv Caves Patericon. It also housed renowned builders and artists, and the monastery life inspired numerous tales and legends. At the same time, it suffered from numerous attacks: in 1096 the monastery was plundered by the Cumans, and in 1169 sacked by prince Andrey Bogolyubsky. In 1203 it was once again plundered by forces of prince Rurik Rostislavich and his allies. In 1240 the monastery fell victim to Mongol invaders commanded by Batu Khan, and in 1416 was burned down by forces of Golden Horde ruler Edigey. After being rebuilt by prince Simeon Olelkovich in 1470, it was once again burned by the Tatars in 1482.

At the Kyiv Pechersk Lavra were buried some high-importance personalities from the period when Kyiv was a part of the Grand Duchy of Lithuania: Prince of Kyiv Vladimir Olgerdovich and his son Aleksandras Olelka, the Lithuanian and Ruthenian Grand Duke Švitrigaila, Feodor Ostrogski, Uliana Olshanska (a second wife of the Lithuanian Grand Duke Vytautas the Great), and the Lithuanian Grand Hetman Konstanty Ostrogski, known for commanding the Grand Ducal Lithuanian Army in the victorious Battle of Orsha (1514) versus the Grand Principality of Moscow Army. Mayors of Kyiv, members of the szlachta and Cossack starshyna, as well as church hierarchs also found their burial place in the monastery.

=== Baroque era and Russian rule ===
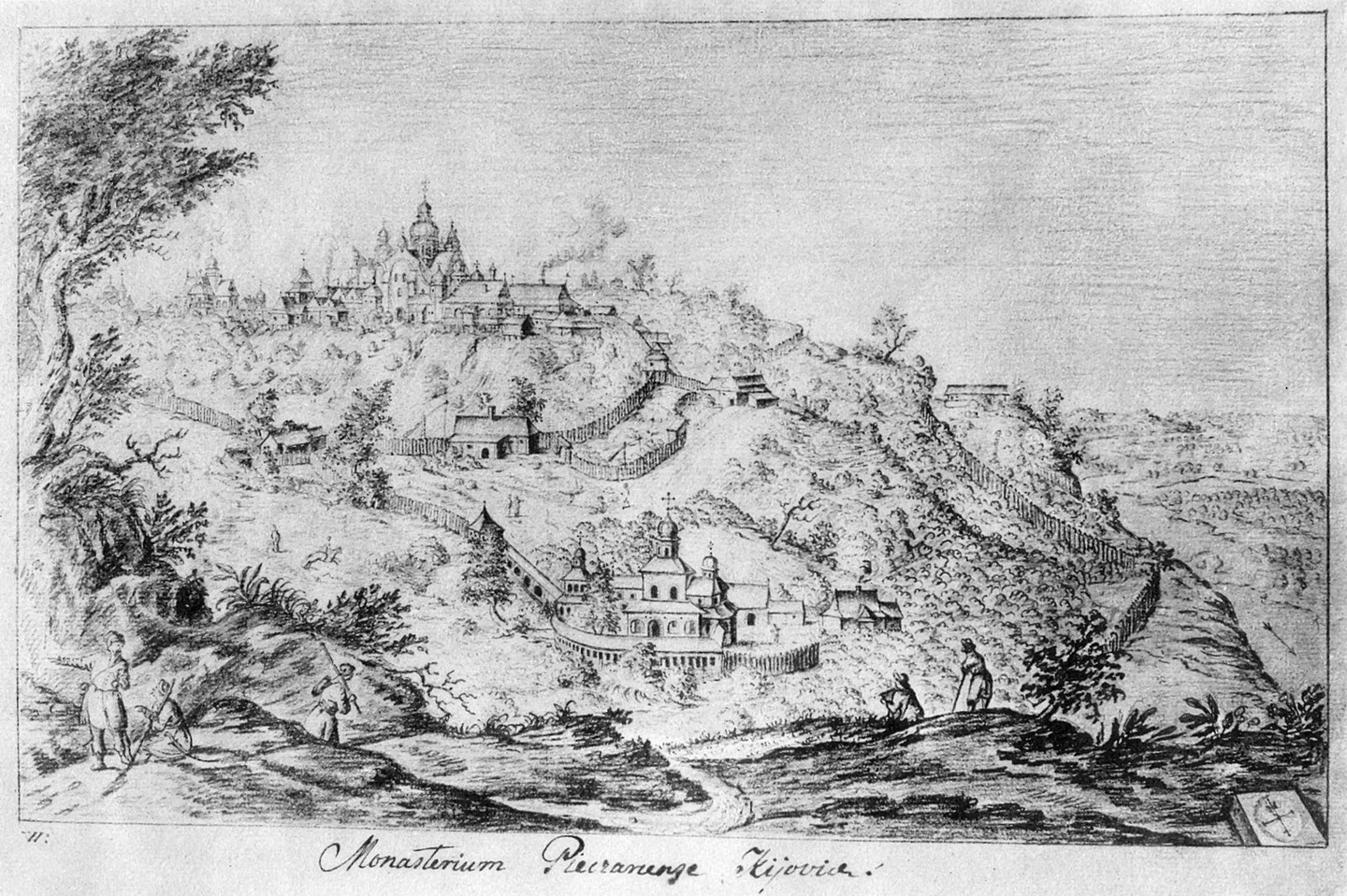
The Near Caves of the Kyiv Pechersk Lavra. Sketch by the Dutch artist Abraham van Westerveld made in 1651

Following reconstruction, during the second half of 16th century the monastery received rights of stauropegion from the Patriarch of Constantinople, and started bearing the name of Lavra. During that period, six separate monasteries were united under its leadership. After the Union of Brest, the monastery became an object of dispute between the Orthodox and Catholic communities. In 1613, the Orthodox established their control after receiving support of the princely Ostrogski family.

In the 17th century, under the leadership of archimandrites Eliseus Pletenetsky, Zacharias Kopystensky and Peter Mohyla, the monastery stood at the heart of Ukrainian national identity. Kyiv Caves Patericon, which was created by Lavra's monks and soon became a popular reading around the whole Eastern Europe, contributed to the emergence of the symbolic image of Kyiv as a capital of Eastern Orthodoxy. Lavra's printing house, established by Pletenetskyi in the 1620s, started the process of Kyiv's cultural revival, and the monastery's school, founded by Mohyla, introduced European educational trends of the time, leading to a radical reform of education. During the Baroque era Kyiv Pechersk Lavra flourished as a centre of arts and spirituality, and pilgrimage to Kyiv was seen by some as more preferable than visiting Jerusalem.

According to a legend published by polemicist and preacher Joannicius Galiatovsky, in 1630 the monastery was besieged by a Polish army, but the Holy Mother of God protected its monks by turning a "fiery rain" against the invaders. In 1631 a school was established at the monastery on the base of Western educational establishments; it would eventually formed with the Brotherhood Monastery school, creating the Kyiv Mohyla Academy.

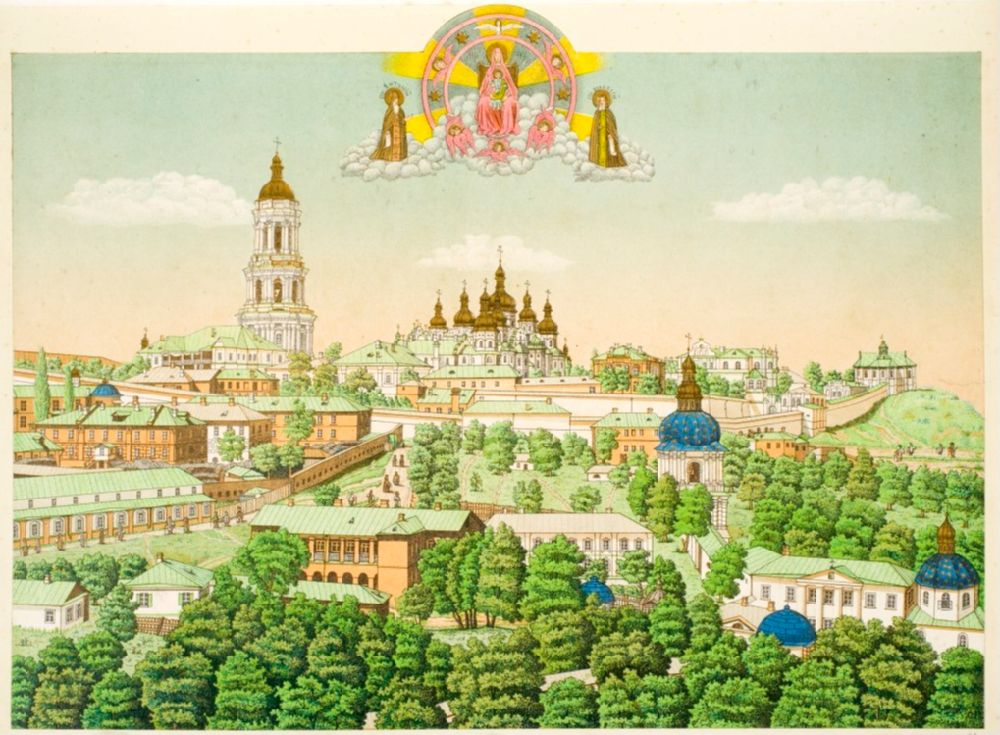
A lithograph of Pechersk Lavra, Kyiv, National Gallery of Art Library, Washington, D.C.

Despite the patronage of powerful figures, including Ivan Mazepa and Raphael Zaborovsky, the Annexation of the Metropolis of Kyiv by the Moscow Patriarchate in 1685 started a process of subjugation of the monastery to Russian imperial authority. In 1688 Lavra became a stauropegion of the Patriarch of Moscow. In 1718, a major fire damaged many of the monastery's buildings, destroying its library and archive, and in 1720 its printing house was subjected to strict government censorship. In 1722, by the decree of Peter I of Russia, the Metropolis of Kyiv was lowered in status to an archbishopric, which made it equal to other subdivisions of the Russian Synodal Church. In the following years, Russian religious traditions, axiology and language were imposed on the Orthodox Church in Ukraine. In 1786 the monastery's lands were secularized, and its elected leadership was replaced with the metropolitan's appointees.

Under the Russian rule, Pechersk Lavra became a popular place of mass pilgrimage for both the common folk and figures of authority, including the royal family. During the late 19th century numerous guides for pilgrims visiting the monastery were published in Tsarist Russia, contributing to its inclusion into the empire's symbolic space. Among prominent figures buried in Lavra's walls under the Russian rule are Natalia Dolgorukova, Pyotr Rumyantsev and Pyotr Stolypin. During the 19th and early 20th centuries, the monastery also served as the residence of Metropolitans of Kyiv, and was known for producing myrrh for the whole Russian Empire. By the time of revolution, the Lavra housed over 1200 monks.

=== Modern history ===
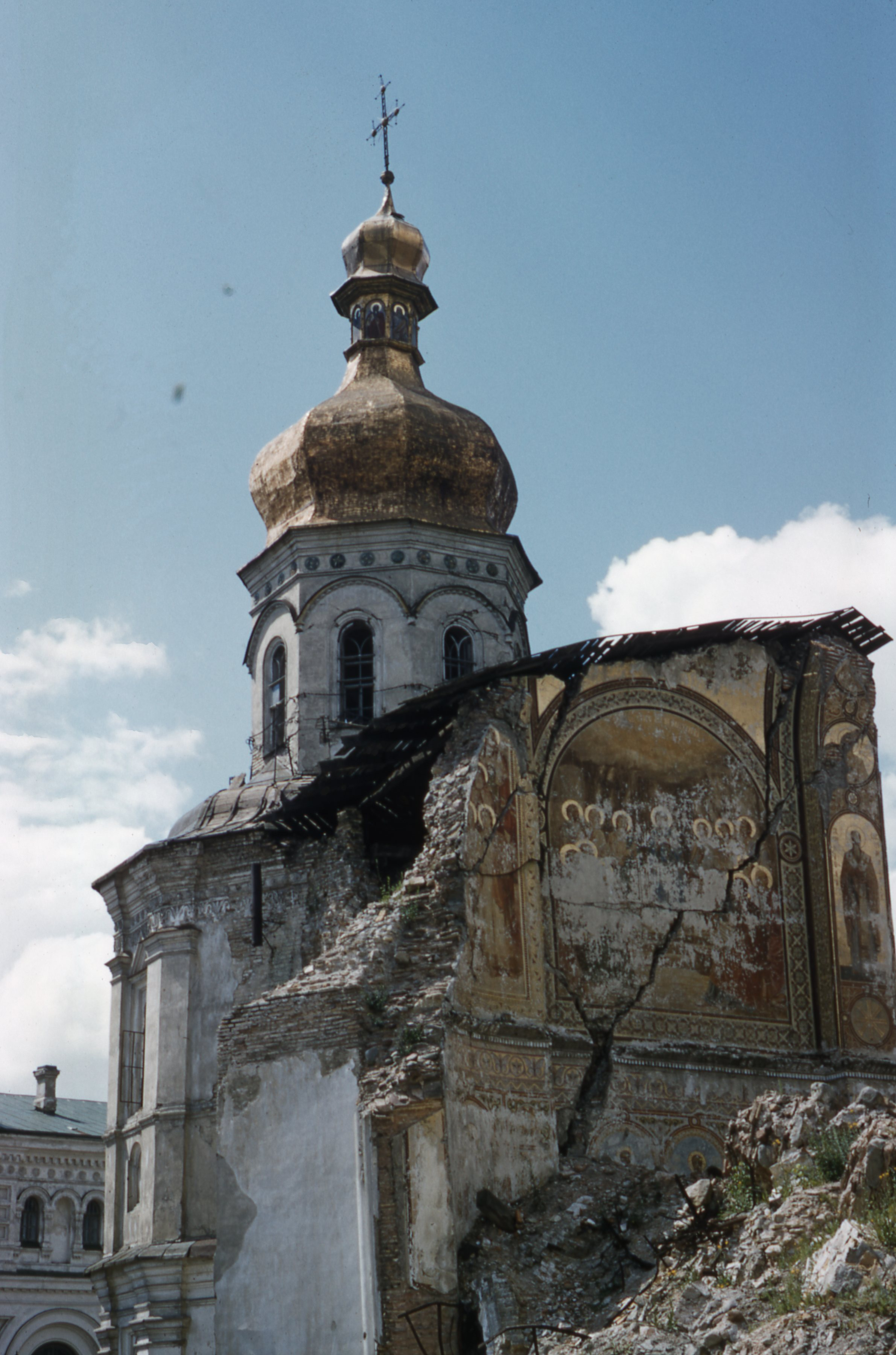
Ruins of the Dormition Cathedral in 1958

During the Ukrainian Revolution of the early 20th century attempts to Ukrainize the Lavra failed due to political instability. On 25 January 1918 Metropolitan Vladimir of Kiev was tortured and murdered in the monastery by Bolshevik troops. In 1921-1922 many valuable objects were confiscated from the monastery by Soviet authorities. Eventually, the monastery was disbanded, and in 1926 a museum was opened on its territory. In 1934, the museum complex was disbanded, and its artifacts distributed among various institutions. Under German occupation religion services in the monastery were resumed.

On 3 November 1941 the main Dormition Cathedral was blown up by Soviet NKVD; Soviet press would falsely accuse the Germans of committing that act. The demolition of the cathedral's ruins continued into the 1960s. After a long period of reconstruction, on 24 August 2000 the reconstructed Dormition Cathedral was solemnly reopened.

Starting from the end of the Second World War, the monastery resumed its activities as part of the Russian Orthodox Church. Over 100 monks lived on Lavra's premises until its next closure by the authorities in 1961.

In 1988 activities of Kyiv Pechersk Lavra were renewed as part of celebrations dedicated to the 1000th anniversary of the Christianization of Kievan Rus'. During the early 1990s the monastery was headed by metropolitan Filaret of Kyiv, whose residence was located on its premises. However, in 1992 ownership over the Lavra was transferred to the Ukrainian Orthodox Church (Moscow Patriarchate) with the support of Kyiv's political leadership. Under the management of the Moscow Patriarchate Lavra became an epicentre of several scandals connected with its leadership's love for expensive cars and other attributes of wealth, as well as its monks' connections to Russian FSB, veneration of Tsar Nicholas II and spread of anti-Ukrainian propaganda.

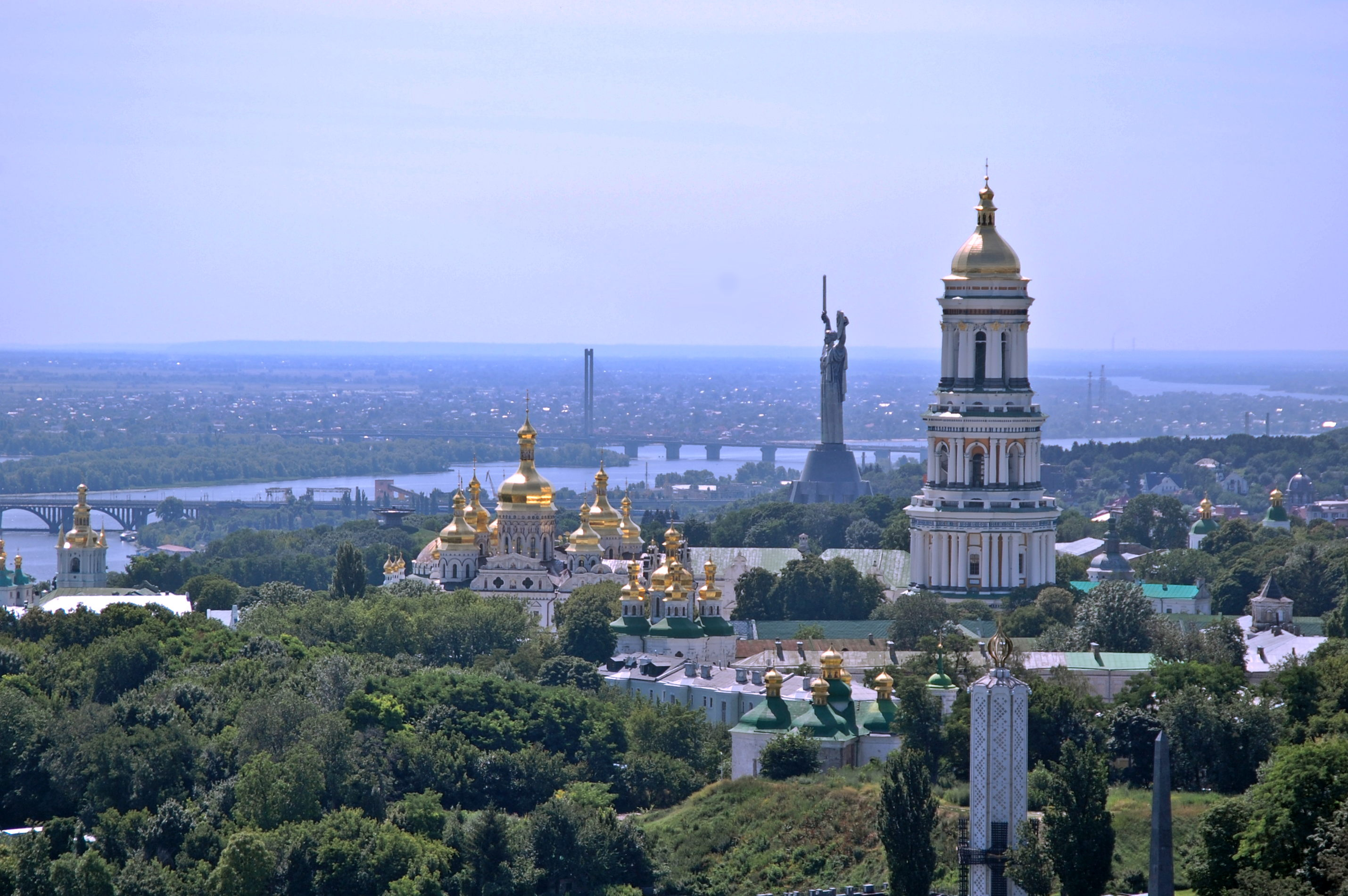
A panorama of the monastery, southward view

Together with the Saint Sophia Cathedral, the Kyiv Pechersk Lavra has been inscribed as a UNESCO World Heritage Site since 1990. (Note: Late 2010 a monitoring mission of UNESCO was visiting the Kyiv Pechersk Lavra to check on situation of the site. At the time the Minister of Culture Mykhailo Kulynyak stated the historic site along with the Saint Sophia Cathedral was not threatened by the "black list" of the organisation. The World Heritage Committee of UNESCO decided in June 2013 that Kyiv Pechersk Lavra, and St. Sofia Cathedral and related monastery buildings would remain on the World Heritage List.) The monastery complex is considered a separate national historic-cultural preserve (sanctuary), the national status to which was granted on 13 March 1996. The Lavra is not only located in another part of the city, but is part of a different national sanctuary than Saint Sophia Cathedral. While being a cultural attraction, the monastery is once again active, with over 100 monks in residence. It was named one of the Seven Wonders of Ukraine on 21 August 2007.

Until the end of 2022, jurisdiction over the site had been divided between the state museum, National Kyiv-Pechersk Historic-Cultural Preserve, and the Ukrainian Orthodox Church (Moscow Patriarchate) (UOC-MP) as the site of the chief monastery of that Church and the residence of its leader, Onufrius, Metropolitan of Kyiv and All Ukraine. In January 2023, the Ukrainian government terminated the UOC-MP's lease of the Dormition Cathedral and the Refectory Church (also known as the Trapezna Church), returning those properties to direct state control. It also announced that the Orthodox Church of Ukraine (OCU) had been granted permission to celebrate a Christmas service in the Dormition Cathedral, on 7 January 2023, Orthodox Christmas by the Old Calendar, a service which was celebrated by Metropolitan Epiphanius of Kyiv at 9am that day.

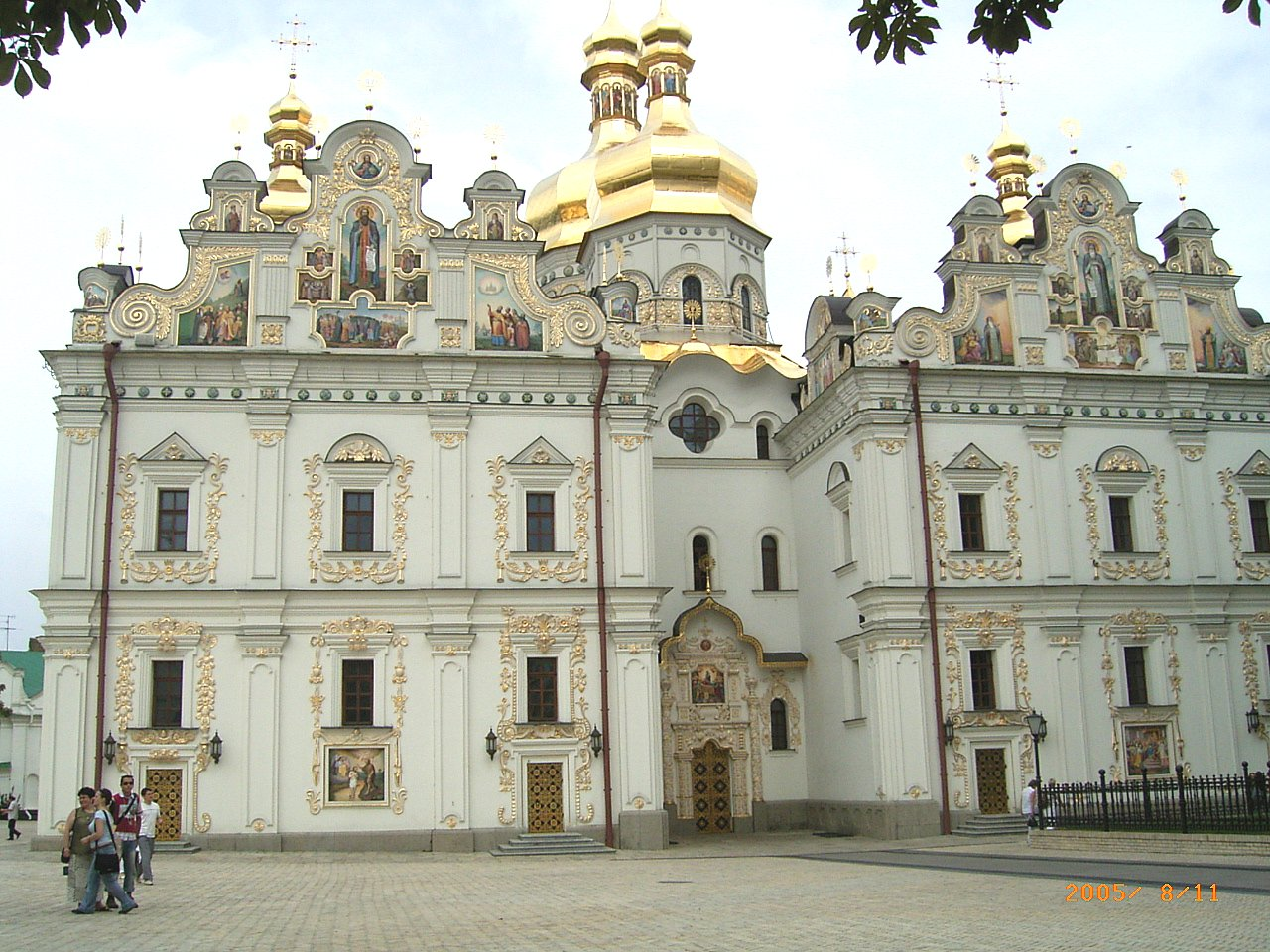
The restored Cathedral of the Dormition, in 2005

On 10 March 2023, the National Kyiv-Pechersk Historic-Cultural Preserve announced that the 2013 agreement on the free use of churches by the UOC-MP would be terminated on the grounds that the church had violated their lease by making alterations to the historic site, and other technical infractions. The UOC-MP was ordered to leave the territory by 29 March. The UOC-MP answered back that there were no legal grounds for the eviction and called it "a whim of officials from the Ministry of Culture." On 17 March 2023 Dmitry Peskov, the press secretary for Russian President Vladimir Putin, stated that the decision of the Ukrainian authorities not to extend this lease to representatives of the UOC-MP "confirms the correctness" of the (24 February 2022) Russian invasion of Ukraine. The UOC-MP did not fully leave Kyiv Pechersk Lavra following 29 March 2023.

On 23 July 2025, a religious service in the Ukrainian language, the first of its kind in many years, was performed in the Far Caves of Kyiv Pechersk Lavra by Metropolitan Epiphanius of Kyiv.

==== 2026 drone attacks ====
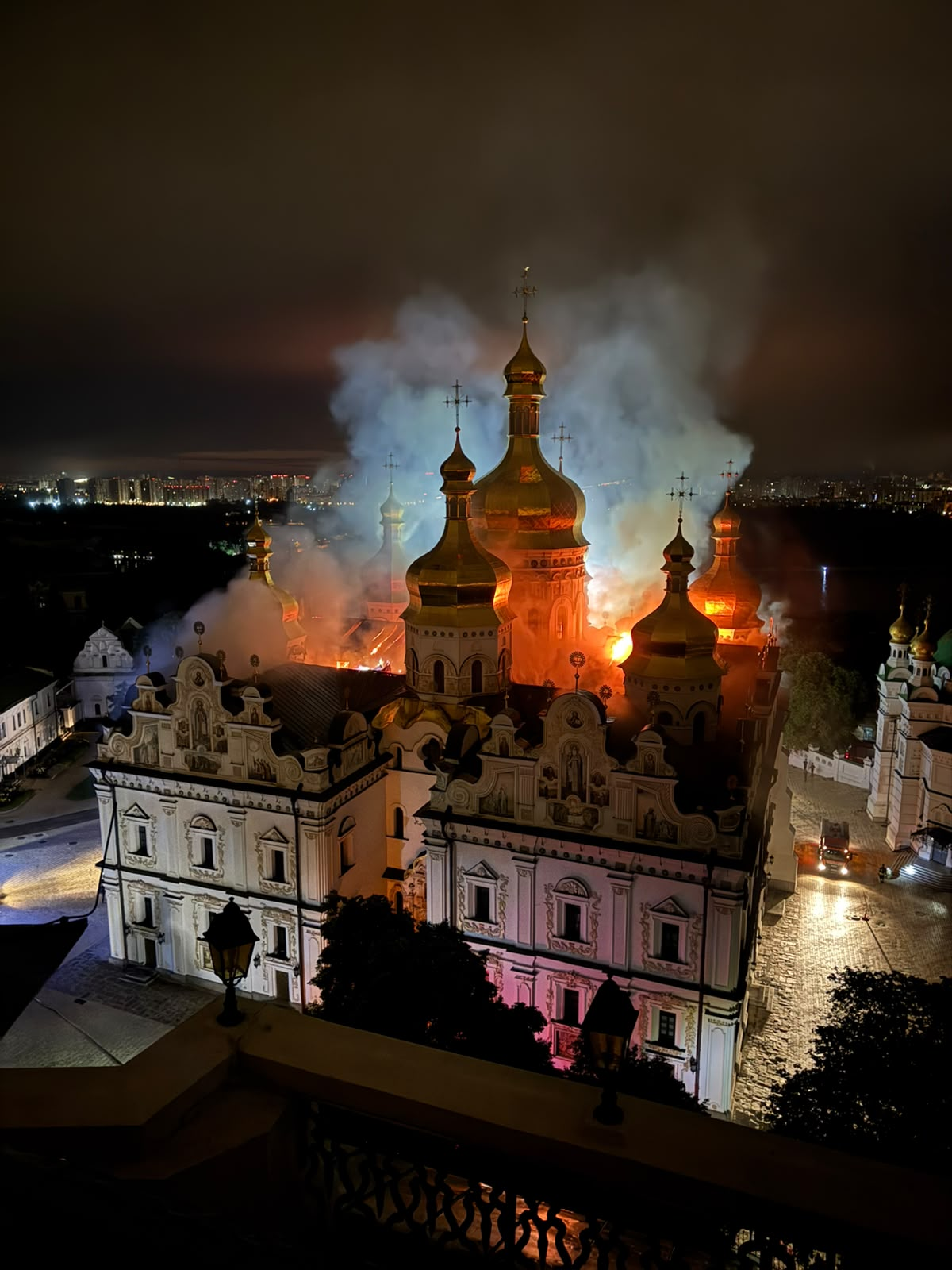
Cathedral on fire, 15 June 2026

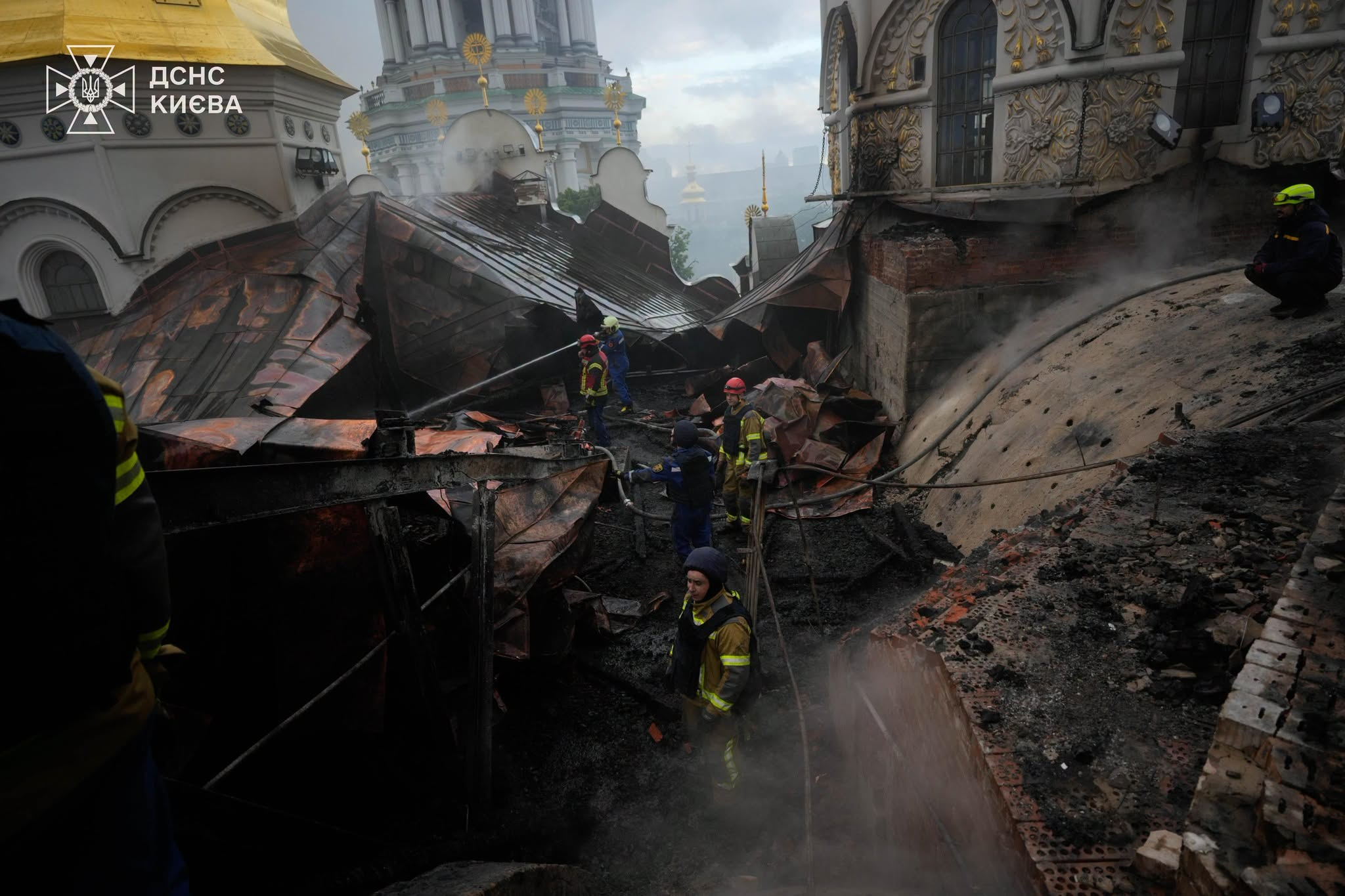
The cathedral roof after the attack

On 24 January 2026, a Russian drone attack shattered windows and damaged two buildings of the complex, marking the first time it sustained war-related damage since World War II.

On 14 June 2026, a Russian drone attack caused significant damage to the complex, as part of a targeted attack that also damaged other cultural elements in Kyiv. The damage, likely from Geran-2 drones ("the Russian version of the Iranian Shahed-type kamikaze drone"), included destruction of a significant portion of the roof, damage to the main dome and cupola, and significant fires within the structure of the Dormition Cathedral. This was the first time the structure was targeted in an armed conflict since World War II. The Security Service of Ukraine published photos of debris from the Geran-2 drone. By 15 June, the remains of two Shahed-type drones had been found at the UNESCO World Heritage site by state security officials, suggesting at least two drones targeted the Kyiv Pechersk Lavra complex around 4:55 a.m. Kyiv time. Russia denied responsibility and blamed a US-made Patriot air-defence missile, but the Kremlin spokesperson offered no evidence of this claim, and no explanation why the remains of Russian-made Shahed-type Geran-2 drones were found at the site instead.

Prime Minister Yulia Svyrydenko of Ukraine posted a photo of the burning monastery and wrote: "A brutal assault on our people ‌and our heritage. This is the true face of Russia’s Orthodox values. We ask for prayers for the salvation of the shrine from destruction. Another Russian crime against humanity, against history, against Christianity." Ukraine's President Volodymyr Zelenskyy called it "one of Russia’s most serious crimes against Christian culture to date", adding: "It is vital that the world does not remain silent in the face of this latest act of Russian barbarism." The attack on the Lavra was widely condemned by European leaders, with European Commission President Ursula von der Leyen calling it "pointless violence": 'Russia has once again shown that it is interested only in violence and destruction.' French President Emmanuel Macron stated that "nothing justifies this attack on our universal heritage," with France's European and Foreign Minister Jean-Noël Barrot adding: "It is as if Notre-Dame or the Cathedral of Saint-Denis were to be bombed in France." EU Foreign Chief Kaja Kallas issued a statement qualifying the attacks on the monastery, just like attacks on Ukrainian civilians, as war crimes, announcing another round of sanctions against Russia. The Romanian Patriarchate expressed "deep concern and sadness" regarding the attack that "represents a loss for all of Christianity and for the universal heritage of humanity".

The Ecumenical Patriarchate of Constantinople issued an official statement strongly condemning the attack, characterizing it as an "unacceptable and profane" assault against a sacred monument of Christianity's shared cultural heritage, noting that "no rational person and no argument can justify this barbaric destructive attack". On 15 June 2026, Ecumenical Patriarch Bartholomew Ι held telephone communications with both Metropolitan Epiphanius of Kyiv and All Ukraine and Ukraine's President Volodymyr Zelenskyy. During these calls, the Ecumenical Patriarch expressed his abhorrence regarding the "act of barbarism and disrespect," conveying the complete support and solidarity of the Mother Church of Constantinople to the war-torn Ukrainian people, while also offering his condolences to the families of the victims and the injured.

== Priors ==
The priors of Kyiv Pechersk Lavra are listed below.

Years	Names	Notes
Hegumens
1051–1062	Antoniy	Founder of the Pechersk Lavra and pioneer of monasticism in Ukraine
1062–1063	Varlaam	First hegumen of the monastery, later headed St. Michael's Golden-Domed Monastery
1063–1074	Theodosius I	Joined the Studite Brethren, initiated the construction of Dormition Cathedral
1074–1077	Stefan I Bolharyn	One of the first singers in Rus', also served as bishop of Volodymyr, canonized
1077–1088	Nikon the Great	Before schema known as Hilarion
1088–1103	John I	In 1096 Cumans led by khan Boniak attacked Kyiv and the Cave Monastery
1108–1112	Theoktistos	Became a bishop of Chernihiv
1112–1125	Prokhor	Completion of the Tale of Bygone Years by Nestor the Chronicler
1125–1131	Timothy / Akindin	
1132–1141	Pimen the Singer	
1142–1156	Theodosius II	
1156–1164	Akindin I	In 1159 the monastery received stauropegic status and since then was known as lavra.
Archimandrites
1165–1182	Polycarp I of Pechersk	The first archimandrite; monastery sacked by Andrey Bogolyubsky (1169)
1182–1197	Basil	
1197-1203	Theodosius III	Monastery sacked by Rurik Rostislavich (1203)
1203-1232	Akindin II	Creation of Kyiv Cave Patericon
1232-1238	Polycarp II	One of the authors of Kyiv Cave Patericon
1238-1249	Agapit I	Monastery sacked by Batu Khan (1240)
1249-1274	Serapion	Later moved to Vladimir
1274-1289	Agapit II	
1289-1292	Dositheus	
1292-1299	John II	
1300-?	Azaria	
~1321	Barsonophius	
~1335	Maxim	
1370/1377-1395	David	
1395-1397	Abrahamius	
1397-1398	Theodosius IV	
1398-1416	Nicetas	Monastery sacked by khan Edigey of the Golden Horde
1417-1434	Ignatius	
1434-1446	Nicephorus I	
1446-1462	Nicholas	
1462-1466	Macarius	
1466-1477	John III	Monastery rebuilt by Simeon Olelkovich
1477-1482	Joasaph	Monastery burned down by Tatars
1482-1493	Theodosius V Woyniłłowicz	
1494-1501/1503	Philaret	
1501/1503-?	Theodosius VI	
?-?	Sylvester	
1506–1508	Vassian I Shyshka	
1508-1509	Jonas I	
1509-1514	Protasius I	
1514-1524	Ignatius II	
1524–1525	Anthony I	
1525-1528	Ignatius II	
1528–1535	Anthony I	
1535-1536	Gennadius	
1536	Joachim	
1536-1538	Protasius II	
1539-1540	Sophronius	
1540	Joseph I Revut	
1540-1541	Sophronius	
1541-1546	Vassian II	
1546-1550	Joachim II	
1551-1554	Hilarion I	
1554-1555	Joseph II	
1556–1572	Hilarion Pesoczynski	
1572-1574	Jonas Despotowicz	
1574-1576	Sylvester of Jerusalem	
1576–1590	Meletius Chrebtowicz-Bohurynski	Received the title of stauropegion (1586)
1593–1599	Nycephorus Tur	Start of conflict between Orthodox and Uniate parties after the Union of Brest
1599–1605	Hipatius Pociej	Member of the Ruthenian Uniate Church
1605–1624	Yelisei Pletenecki	Established the first printing press in Kyiv (1615)
1624–1627	Zakhariy Kopystenski	Well-known polemicist and theologian
1627–1646	Peter Mogila	Opened the monastery school (1631), in 1632 merged into the Kyiv Collegium
1647-1655	Joseph Tryzna	
1656–1683	Innocent (Giesel)	Director of the monastery printing house, publisher of Kievan Synopsis (1674)
1684–1690	Varlaam Yasinski	Subordinated the monastery to the Patriarch of Moscow (1688), while retaining its autonomy
1691–1697	Meletius Wujachewicz-Wysoczynski	
1697–1708	Joasaph Krokowski	Theologian and ally of Ivan Mazepa
1709	Hilarion	
1710–1714	Athanasius Myslawski	
1715–1729	Joanicius Seniutovych	A fire in 1718 destroyed the library and archive, as well as most buildings of the monastery
1730–1736	Roman Kopa	
1737–1740	Hilarion Nehrebecki	
1740–1748	Timothy Szczerbacki	Favourite of Elizabeth I of Russia, supporter of Hryhorii Skovoroda
1748–1751	Joseph Oranski	
1752–1761	Luka Bilousovych	
1762–1786	Zosima Valkevych	In 1786 the monastery's property was seized by the Russian government and the tradition of elected leadership was abolished
Representatives of Metropolitan bishops of Kyiv
1787-1792	Callist Stefanov	First prior appointed directly by the Metropolitan of Kyiv, who officially attained the title of archimandrite
1792–1795	Theophilact Slonetsky	
1795-1799	Hieronym Yanovsky	
1800-1815	Joel Voskoboinykov	
1815–1826	Antonius Smyrnytsky	
1826–1834	Auxentius Halynsky	
1844–1852	Laurentius Makarov	
1852–1862	John Petin	
1878–1884	Hilarion Yushenov	
1884–1892	Juvenalius Polovtsev	
1893–1896	Sergius Lanin	
1896-1909	Antonius Petrushevsky	
1909–1918	Ambrosius Bulgakov	
Priors after the Revolution of 1917
1918-1920	Antony Khrapovitsky	Opposed autocephaly of the Ukrainian church; removed from his post, later emigrated
1921-1924	Michael Mytrofanov	Member of Ukrainian Synodal Church; confiscation of many relics by Soviet authorities (1921–22)
1924-1926	Climent Zheretiyenko	
1925-1929	Innocent Pustynsky	Member of Ukrainian Synodal Church; closure of the monastery by authorities (1926)
1926–1929	Hermogen Golubev	
Monastery dissolved (1929-1942)
Representatives of Metropolitan bishops of Kyiv
1942-1947	Valerius Ustymenko	
1947-1953	Cronides Sakun	
1953-1961	Nestor Tuhay	
Monastery dissolved (1961-1988)
Representatives of Metropolitan bishops of Kyiv
1988-1989	Jonathan Yeletskikh	
1989-1992	Eleutherius Dydenko	
1992	Pitirim Starynsky	Member of Ukrainian Orthodox Church - Moscow Patriarchate (UOC)
1992	Hyppolit Khilko	Member of UOC
1994-2023	Paul Lebid	Member of UOC; Dormition Cathdral rebuilt (1998-2000)
since 2023	Abrahamius Lotysh	Member of Orthodox Church of Ukraine

== Buildings and structures ==
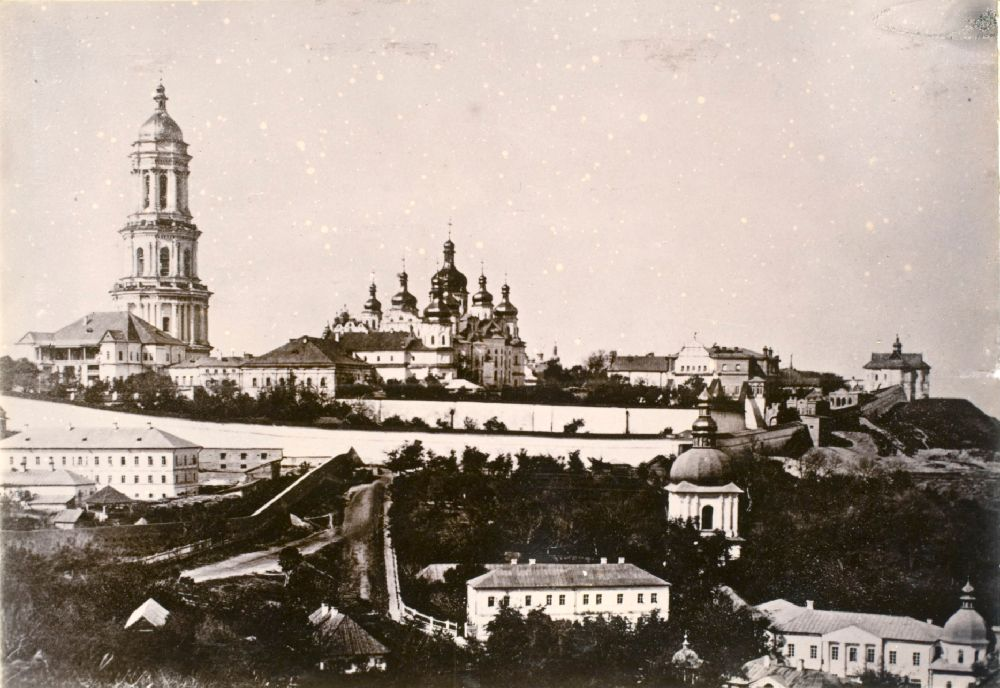
Pechersk Lavra, Kyiv, in 1889, Department of Image Collections, National Gallery of Art Library, Washington, D.C.

The Kyiv Pechersk Lavra contains numerous architectural monuments, ranging from bell towers to cathedrals to cave systems and to strong stone fortification walls. The main attractions of the Lavra include the Great Lavra Belltower, and the Dormition Cathedral, destroyed in fighting the Germans World War II, and fully reconstructed in the 1990s after the fall of Soviet Union by Ukraine.

Other churches and cathedrals of the Lavra include: the Refectory Church, the Church of All Saints, the Church of the Saviour at Berestove, the Church of the Exaltation of Cross, the Church of the Trinity, the Church of the Nativity of the Virgin, the Church of the Conception of St. Anne, and the Church of the Life-Giving Spring. The Lavra also contains many other constructions, including: the St. Nicholas Monastery, the Kyiv Theological Academy and Seminary, and the Debosquette Wall.

=== Great Lavra Belltower ===
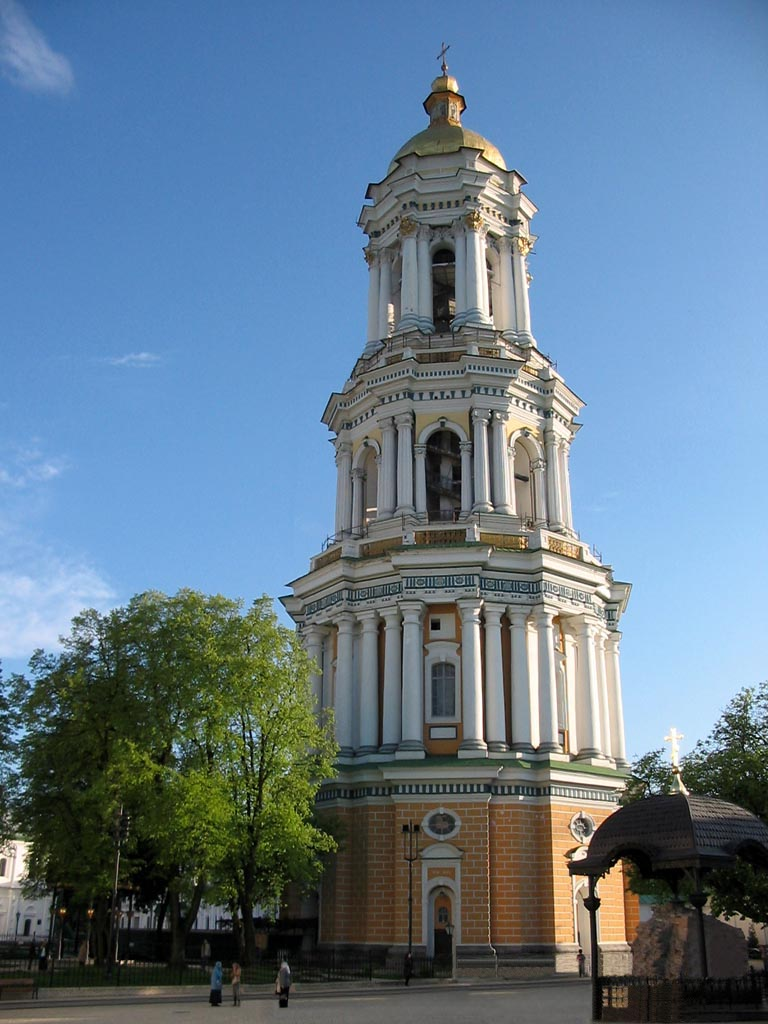
Up-close view of the Great Lavra Belltower with its four tiers in 2005

The Great Lavra Belltower is one of the most notable features of the Kyiv skyline and among the main attractions of the Lavra. 96.5 meters in height, it was the tallest free-standing belltower at the time of its construction in 1731–1745, and was designed by the architect Johann Gottfried Schädel. It is a Classical style construction and consists of tiers, surmounted by a gilded dome.

=== Dormition Cathedral ===
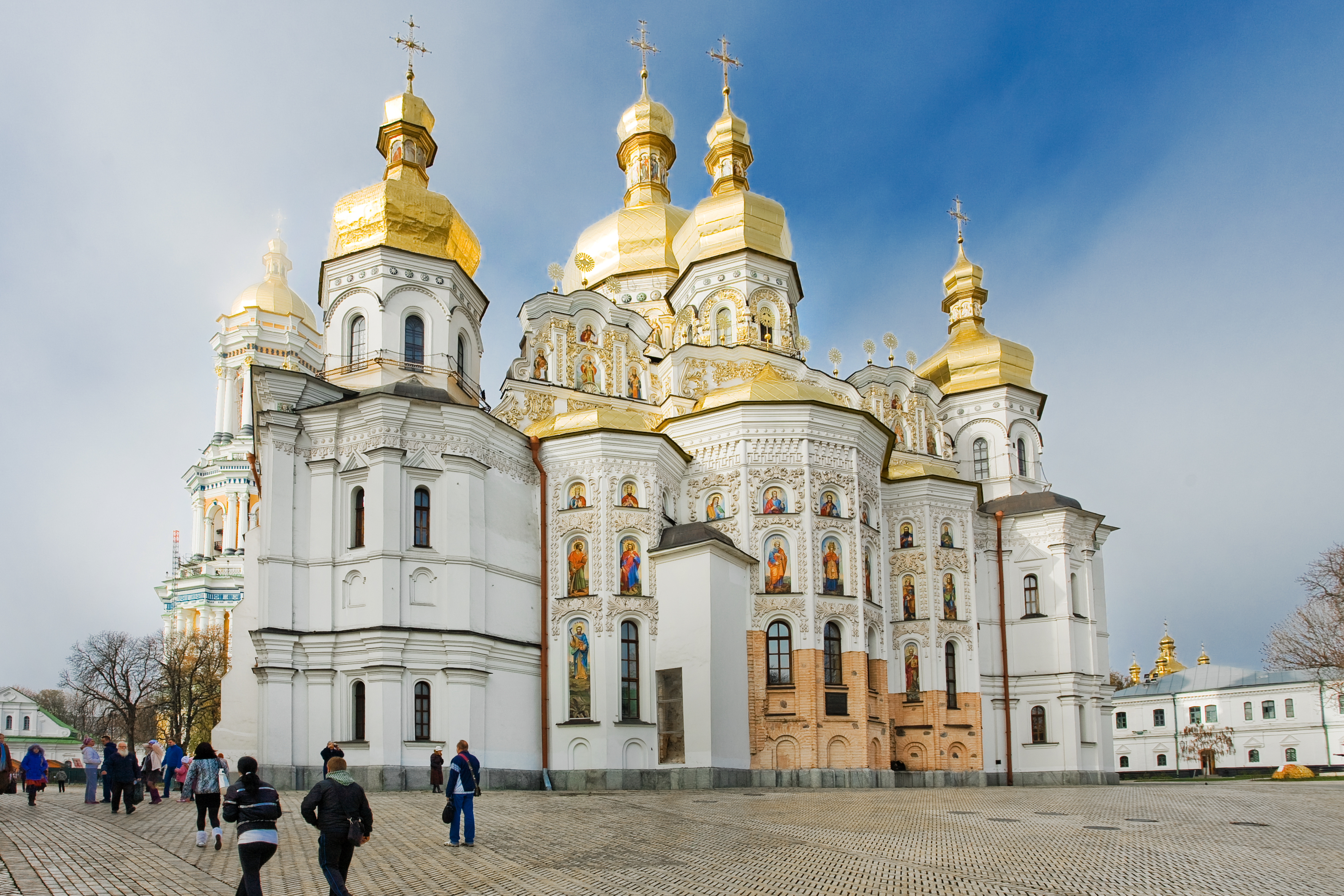
The restored Dormition Cathedral

Built in the 11th century, the main church of the monastery was destroyed during the World War II, a couple of months after the Nazi Germany troops occupied the city of Kyiv, during which the Soviet Union conducted the controversial 1941 Khreshchatyk explosions. Withdrawing Soviet troops practiced the tactics of scorched earth and blew up all the Kyiv bridges over Dnieper as well as the main Khreshchatyk street and Kyiv Pechersk Lavra. The destruction of the cathedral followed a pattern of Soviet disregard for cultural heritage, as they previously blew up the ancient St. Michael's Golden-Domed Monastery nearby in the 1930s.

In 1928, the monastery was converted into an anti-religious museum park by the Soviet authorities and after their return no efforts were provided to restore the church. The temple was finally restored in 1995 after Ukraine obtained its independence and the construction was accomplished in two years. The new Dormition Church was consecrated in 2000.

=== Gate Church of the Trinity ===
The Gate Church of the Trinity is located atop the Holy Gates, which houses the entrance to the monastery. According to a legend, this church was founded by the Chernihiv Prince Sviatoslav II. It was built atop an ancient stone church which used to stand in its place. After the fire of 1718, the church was rebuilt, its revered facades and interior walls enriched with ornate stucco work made by craftsman V. Stefaovych. In the 18th century, a new gilded pear-shaped dome was built, the facade and exterior walls were decorated with stucco-moulded plant ornaments and a vestibule built of stone attached to the north end. In the early 20th century, the fronts and the walls flanking the entrance were painted by icon painters under the guidance of V. Sonin. The interior of the Gate Trinity Church contains murals by the early 18th century painter Alimpy Galik.

=== Refectory chambers with Church of the Saints Anthony and Theodosius ===
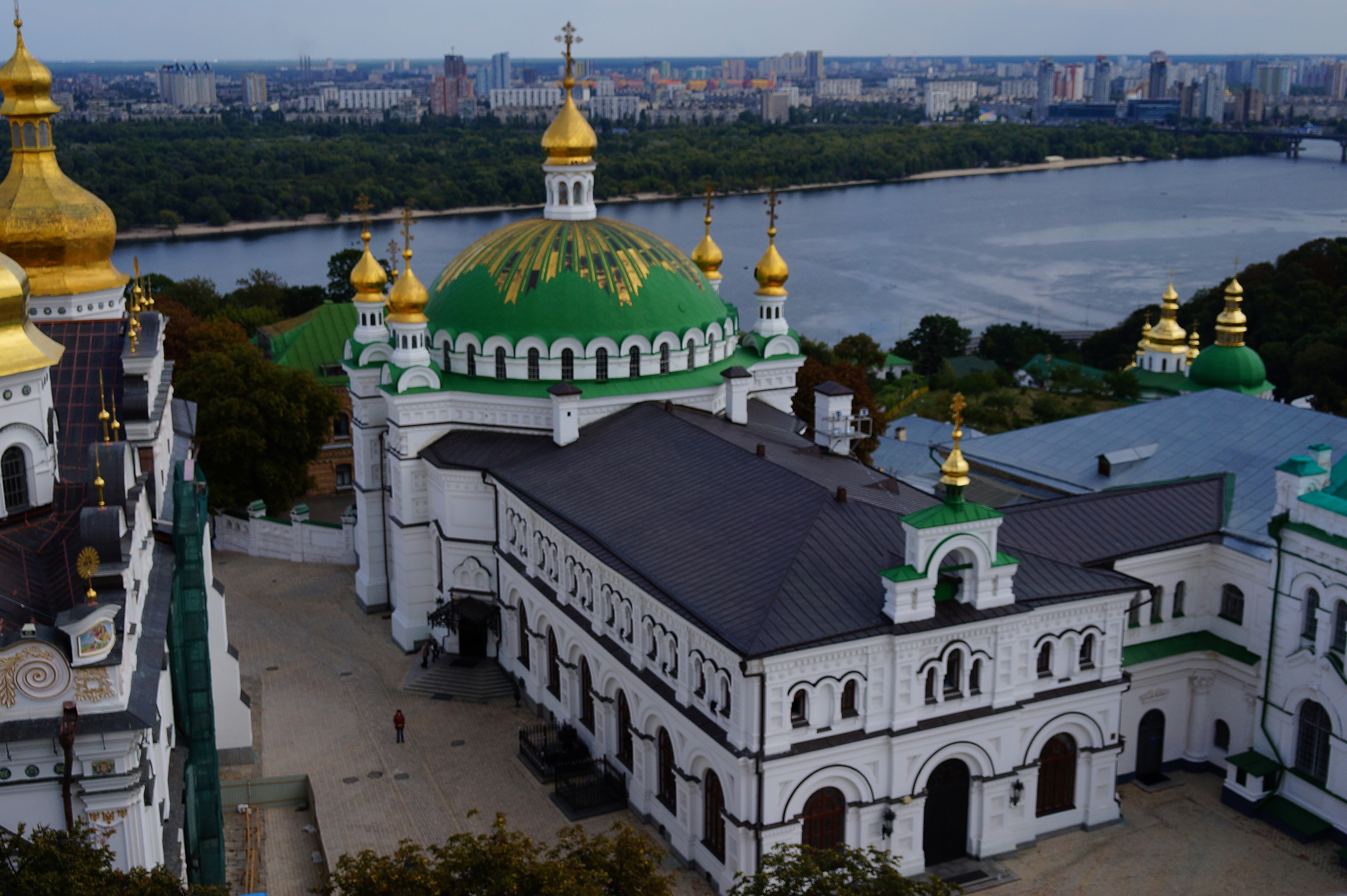
Refectory Church

The refectory chambers with the Church of the Saints Anthony and Theodosius is the third in a series of temples. The original temple was built in the 12th century and no drawings or visual depictions of it remain. The second temple was built at the time of the Cossack Hetmanate and was disassembled by the Russian authorities in the 19th century. It was replaced with the current temple, often referred to as the Refectory Church of the Kyiv Pechersk Lavra.

=== The All Saints Church ===
The All Saints Church, erected in 1696–1698, is a fine specimen of Ukrainian baroque architecture. Characteristic of the church facades are rich architectural embellishments. In 1905, students of the Lavra art school painted the interior walls of the church. The carved wooden iconostasis is multi-tiered and was made for the All Saints church in the early 18th century.

=== Church of the Saviour at Berestove ===
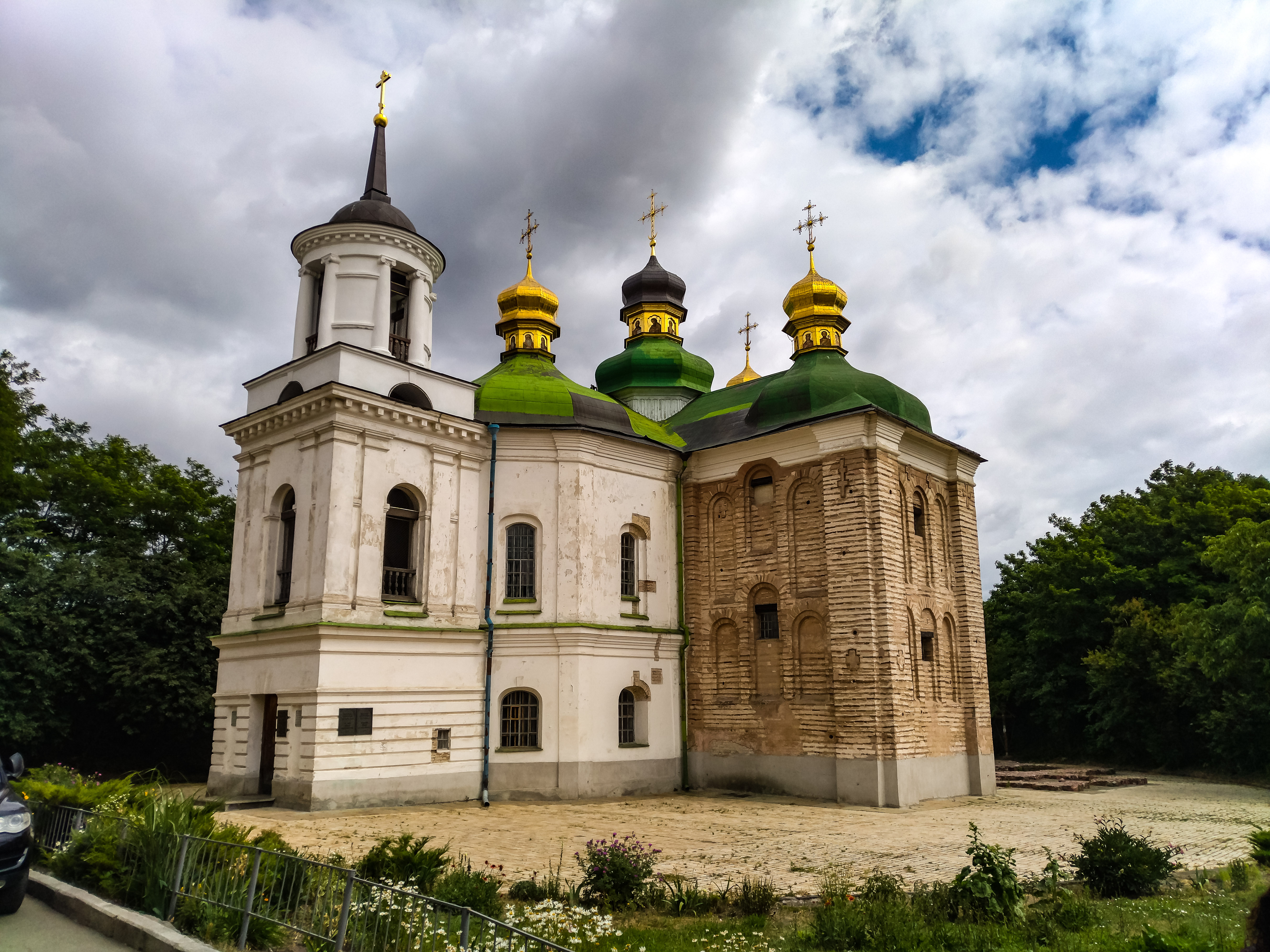
Side view of the Church of the Saviour at Berestove seen with its campanile, designed by architect Andrei Melenskyi in the Classical style.

The Church of the Saviour at Berestove is located to the North of the Kyiv Pechersk Lavra. It was constructed in the village of Berestove around the start of the 11th century during the reign of Prince Vladimir Monomakh. It later served as the mausoleum of the Monomakh dynasty, also including Yuri Dolgoruki, the founder of Moscow. Despite being outside the Lavra fortifications, the Church of the Saviour at Berestove is part of the Kyiv Pechersk Lavra complex.

=== Caves ===
The Kyiv Pechersk Lavra caverns are a system of narrow underground corridors (about 1-1½ metres wide and 2-2½ metres high), along with numerous living quarters and underground chapels. In 1051, the monk Anthony settled in an old cave in a hill near the Kyiv Pechersk Lavra. This cave received additions including corridors and a church, and is now the Far Caves. In 1057, Anthony moved to a cave near the Upper Lavra, now called the Near Caves.

Foreign travellers in the 16th–17th centuries wrote that the catacombs of the Lavra stretched for hundreds of kilometres, reaching as far as Moscow and Novgorod, spreading awareness of the Kyiv Pechersk Lavra.

=== Library ===
The notable library of the Lavra was burned during the reign of Peter the Great. On the night of April 21–22, 1718, Orthodox monks — tsarist agents — set fire to the premises of the Lavra, where its library and archive with unique documents and books from the historical past of Ukraine were located.

In 1988, after the restoration of the monastery's activities, library work was resumed. The funds began to be replenished with those publications that the Lavra monks and parishioners managed to save. New books began to be purchased, and some of the books that began to be published by the Lavra printing house restored in 1995 were transferred to the library.

Over 20 years of activity after the revival of the monastery, more than 10 thousand volumes were collected. In 2008, the library was moved to premises that allow the best placement and organization of library funds. Accounting and cataloging of the Lavra library funds were digitized.

=== Necropolis ===
There are over a hundred burials in the Lavra. Below are the most notable ones

- Ilya Muromets – in the caves (c. 11th–12th century)
- Nestor the Chronicler – in the Near Caves (c. 1114)
- Saint Kuksha – in the Near Caves (c. 1114)
- Alipy of the Caves – in the Near Caves (c. 1114)
- Agapetus of Pechersk – in the Near Caves (c. 11th century)
- Oleg son of Vladimir II Monomakh – in the Church of the Saviour at Berestove (c. 12th century)
- Eufemia of Kyiv daughter of Vladimir II Monomakh – in the Church of the Saviour at Berestove (1139)
- Yuri Dolgoruki – in the Church of the Saviour at Berestove (1157)
- Vladimir Olgerdovich – Prince of Kyiv, son of the Lithuanian Grand Duke Algirdas
- Aleksandras Olelka – Prince of Kyiv, son of Vladimir Olgerdovich
- Skirgaila – regent Grand Duke of Lithuania (1397)
- Feodor Ostrogski
- Uliana Olshanska – a second wife of the Lithuanian Grand Duke Vytautas the Great (1448)
- Švitrigaila – the Lithuanian and Ruthenian Grand Duke (1452)
- Konstanty Ostrogski – near the Cathedral of the Dormition (1530)
- Vasily Kochubey – near the Refectory Church (1708)
- Ivan Iskra – near the Refectory Church (1708)
- Pyotr Stolypin – near the Refectory Church (1911)
- St. Spyridon – in the caves (c. 19th–20th century)
- Pope Clement I – his head in the Far Caves (his remaining relics brought to San Clemente in Rome by Sts. Cyril and Methodius)

During the Soviet era, the bodies of the saints that lay in the caves were left uncovered due to the regime's disregard for religion. However, after the fall of the Soviet Union, the bodies were covered with a cloth and to this day remain in the same state.

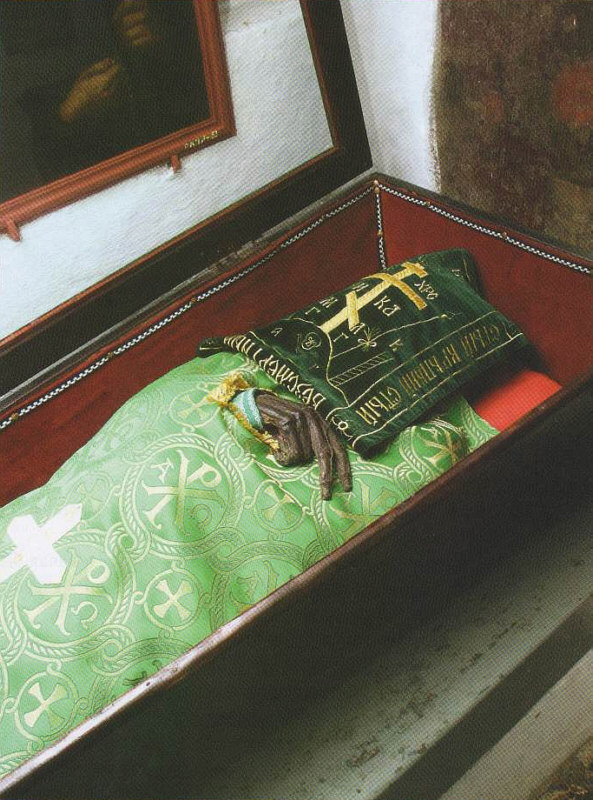
Imperishable relic of saint Ilya Muromets in Kyiv Pechersk Lavra

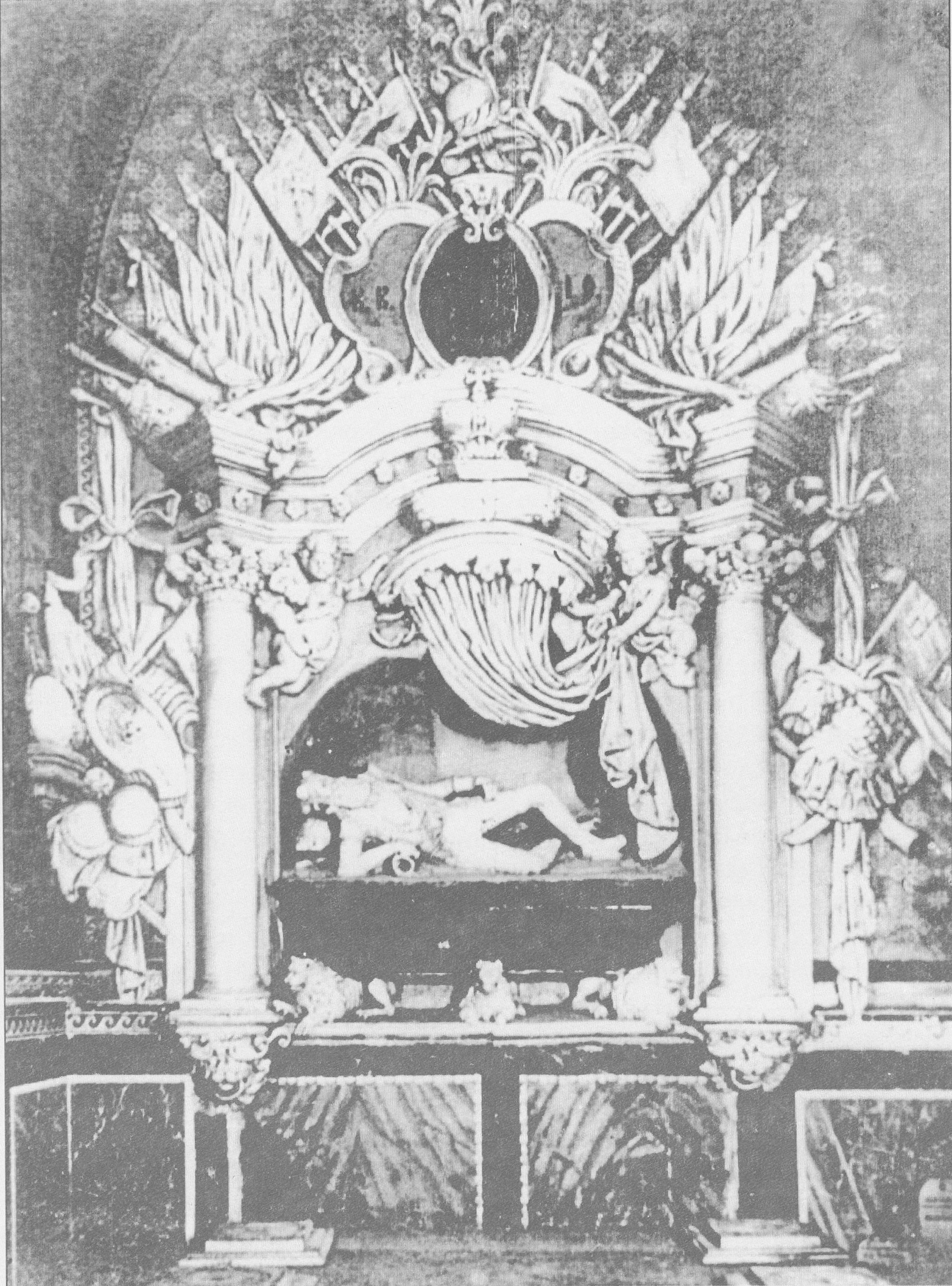
Monument to Konstanty Ostrogski

== Museum ==
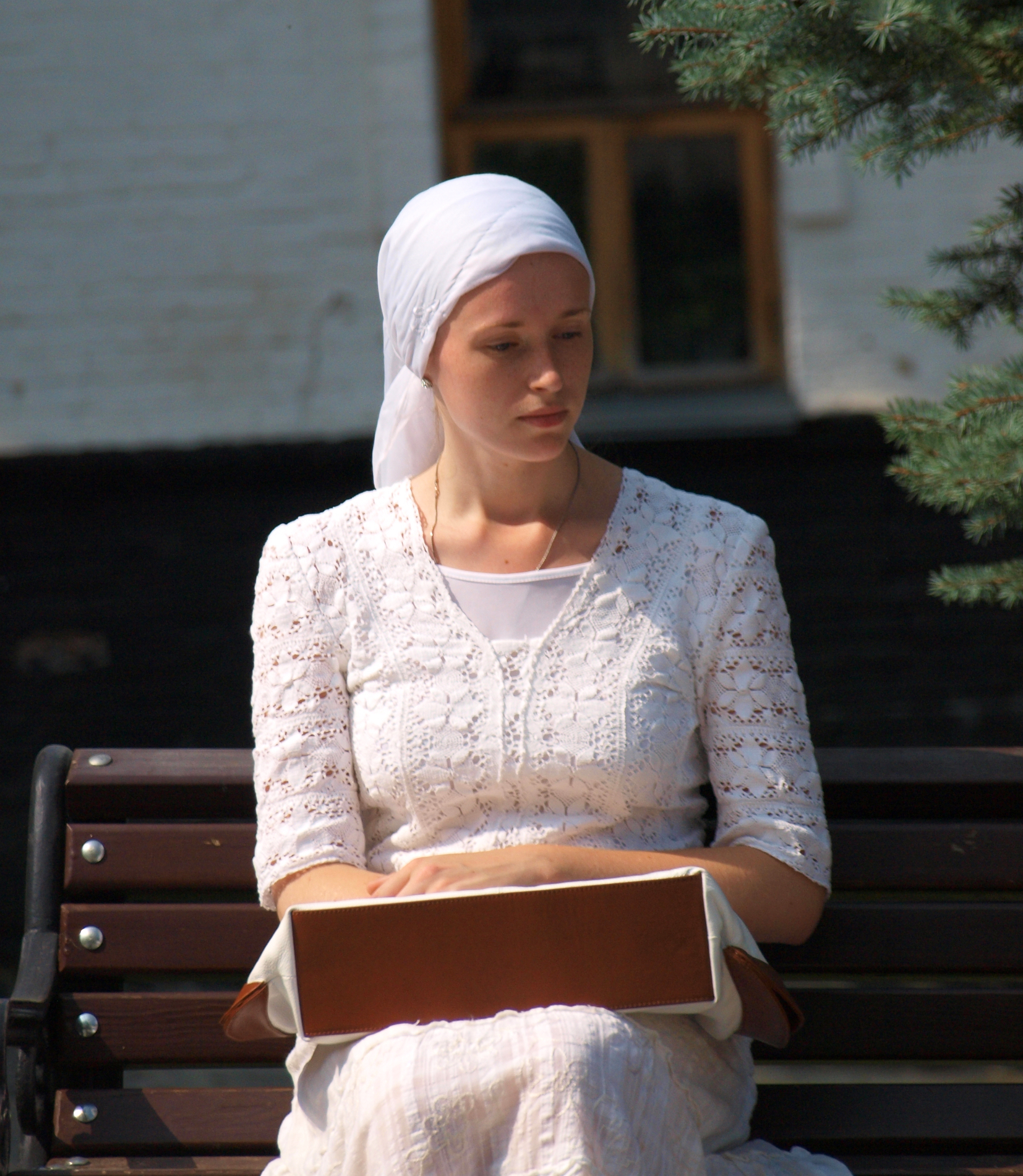
Eastern Orthodox pilgrim in Kyiv Pechersk Lavra – women must cover their head when entering the lavra.

The Kyiv Pechersk Lavra is one of the largest museums in Kyiv. The exposition is the actual ensemble of the Upper (Near Caves) and Lower (Far Caves) Lavra territories, which house many architectural relics of the past. The collection within the churches and caves includes articles of precious metal, prints, higher clergy portraits and rare church hierarchy photographs. The main exposition contains articles from 16th to early 20th centuries, which include chalices, crucifixes, and textiles from 16th–19th centuries, with needlework and embroidery of Ukrainian masters. The remainder of the collection consists of pieces from the Lavra's Printing House and the Lavra's Icon Painting Workshop.

The museum provides tours of the catacombs, which contain remains of Eastern Orthodox saints or their relics. The Caves are of geological interest because they are excavated into loess ground. They form one of the most extensive occurrences of loess caves in the world.

The Lavra museums include:

- Museum of Historical Treasures of Ukraine
  - Martynivka Treasure
- Book and print history museum
- Museum of Ukrainian Folk Art
- Theater and film arts museum
- State historical library

== Images ==
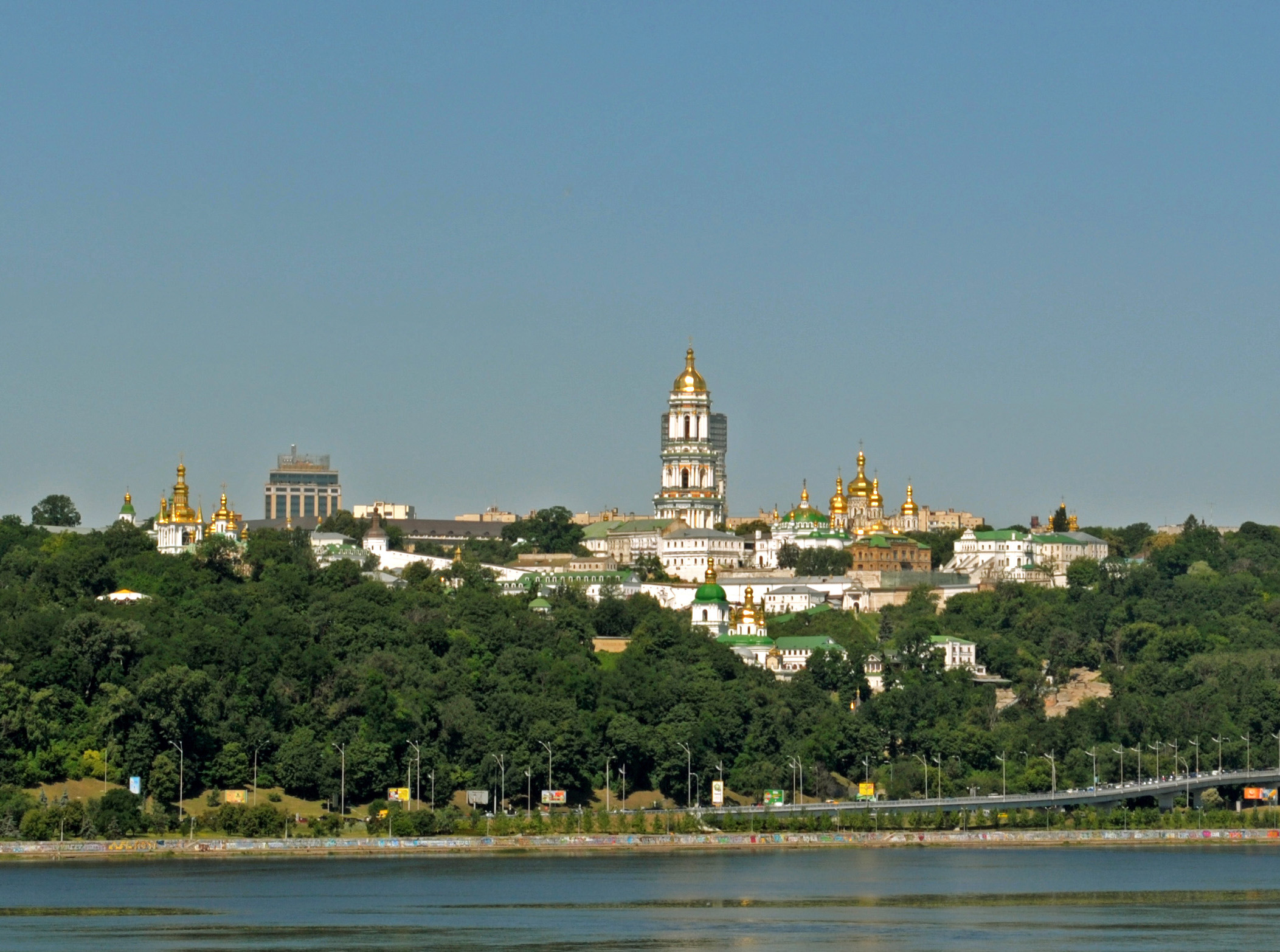

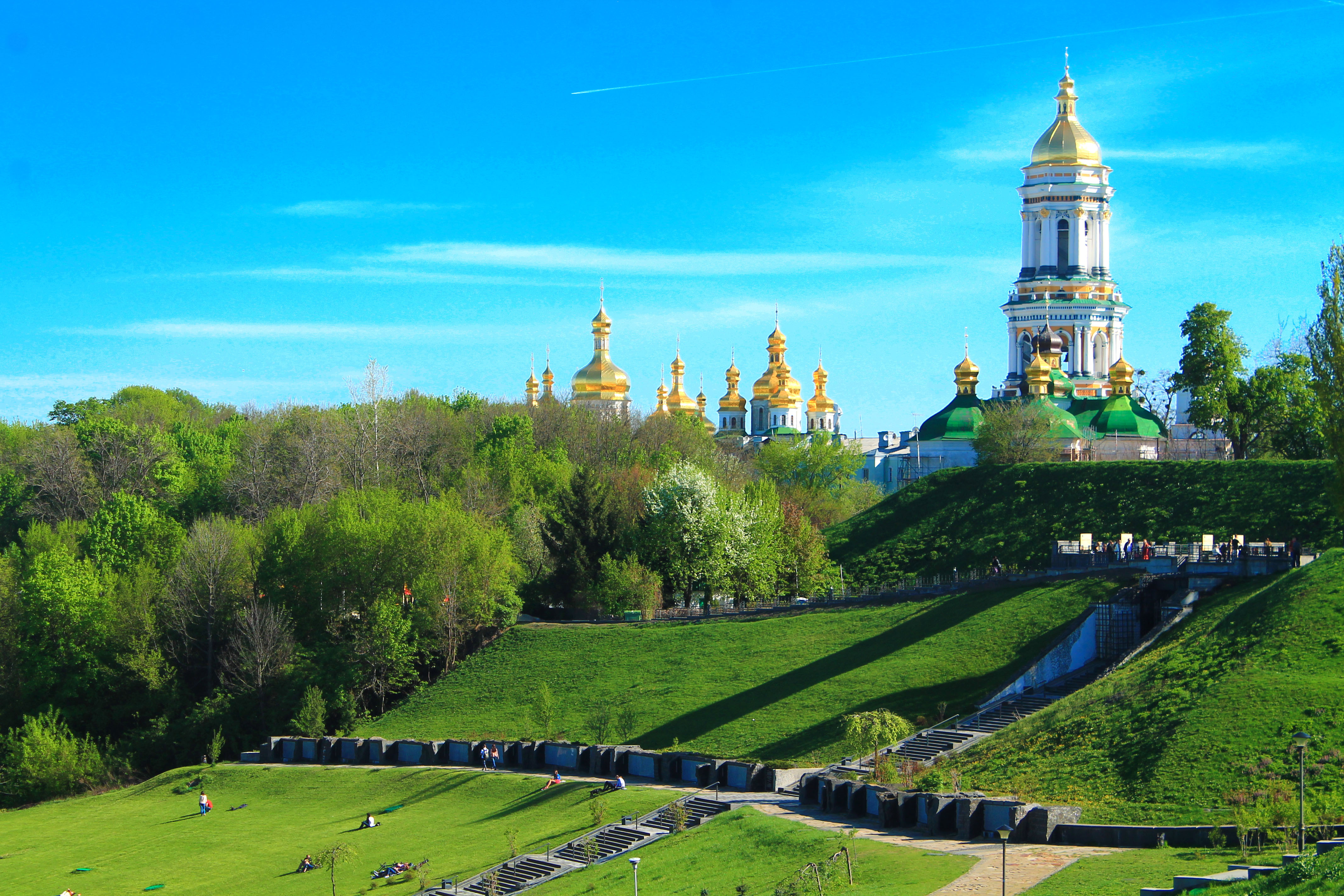

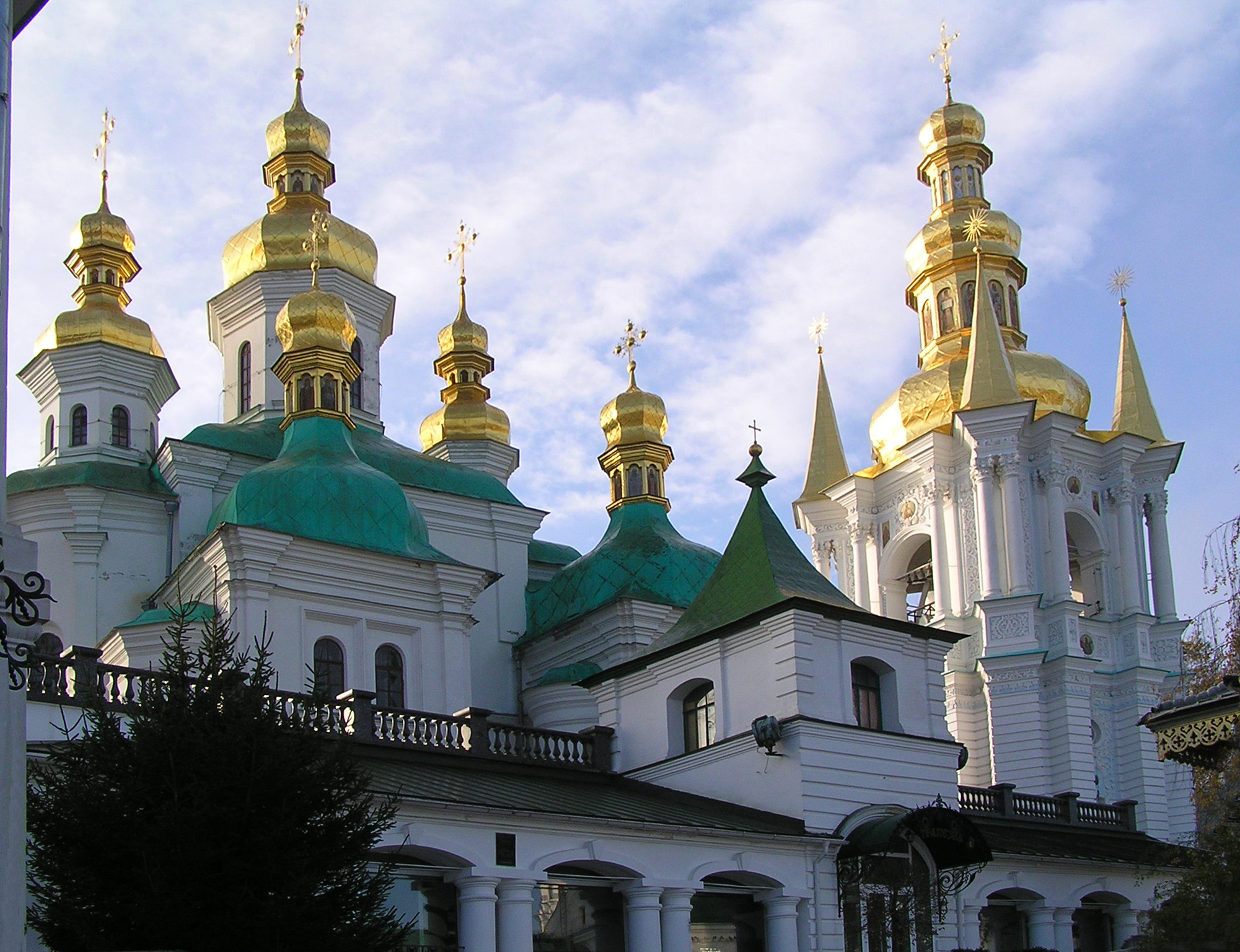

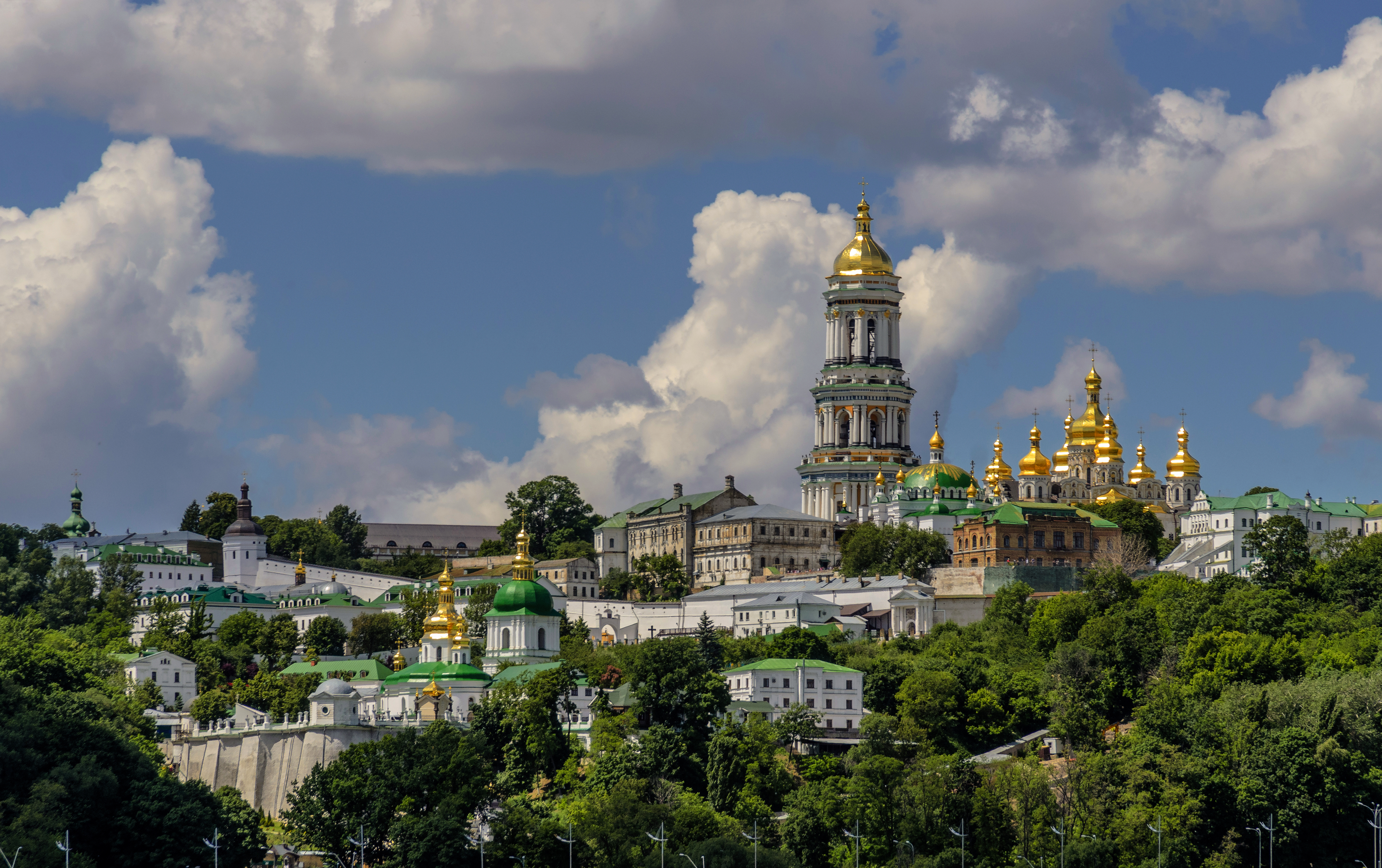

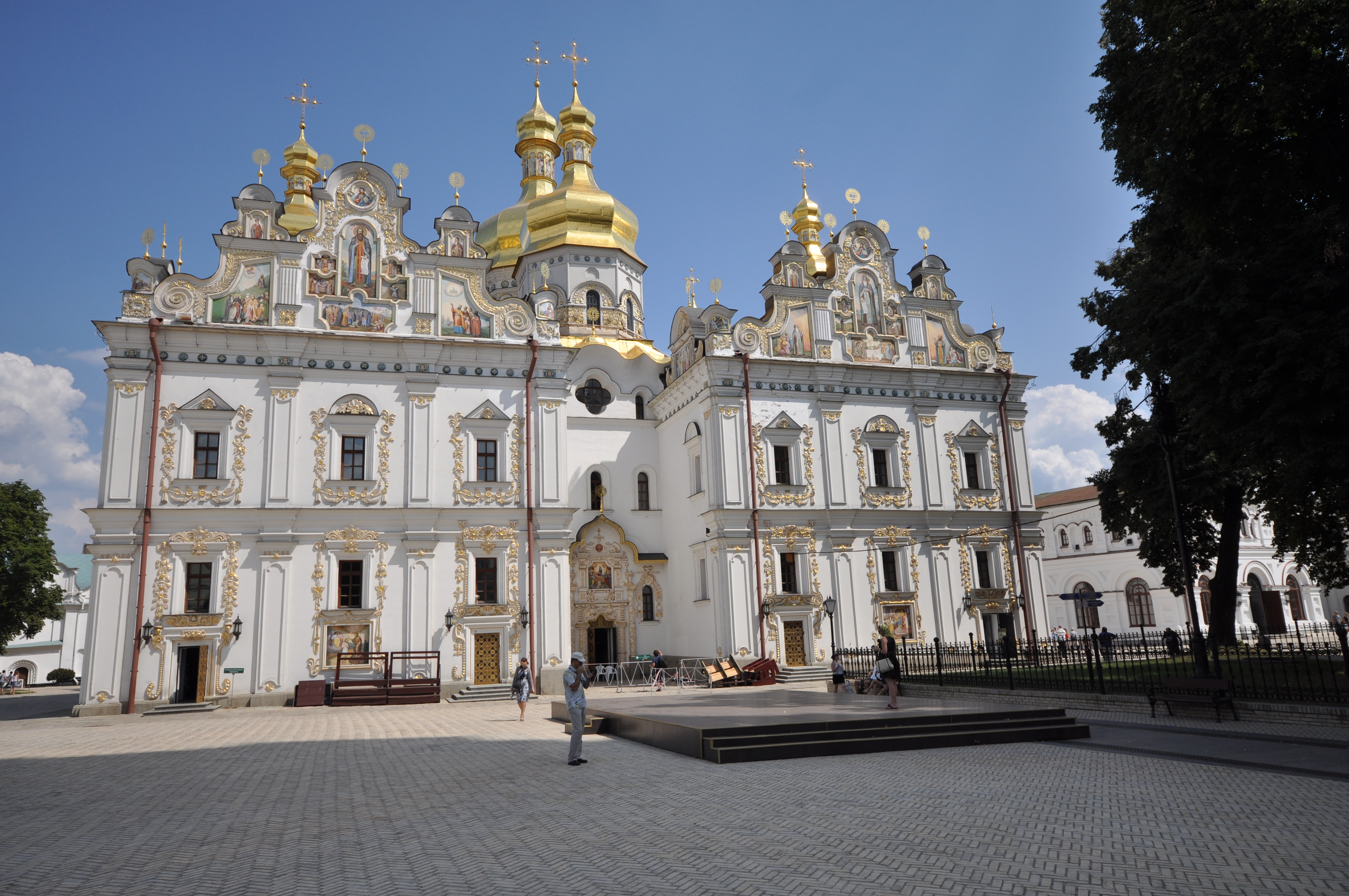

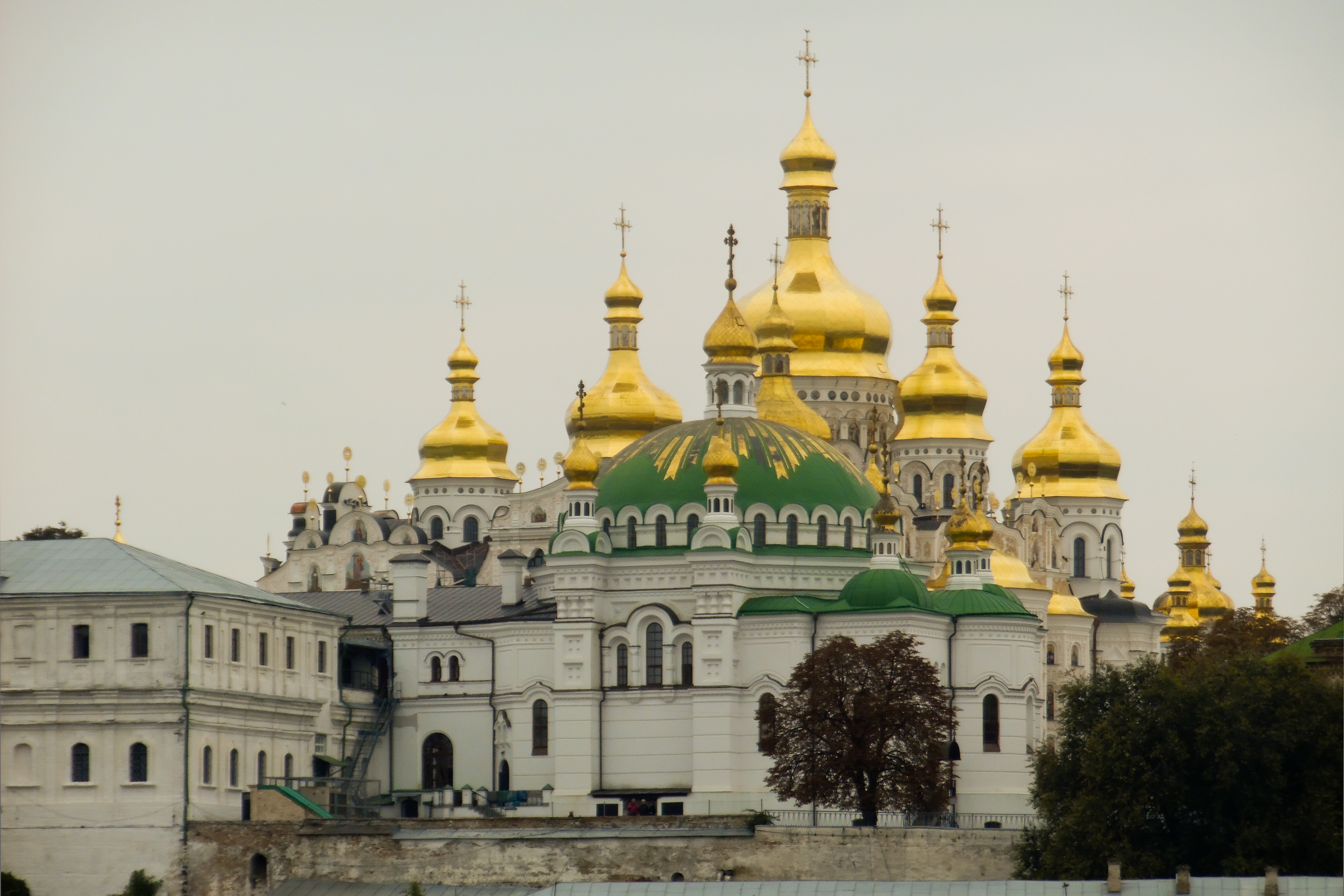

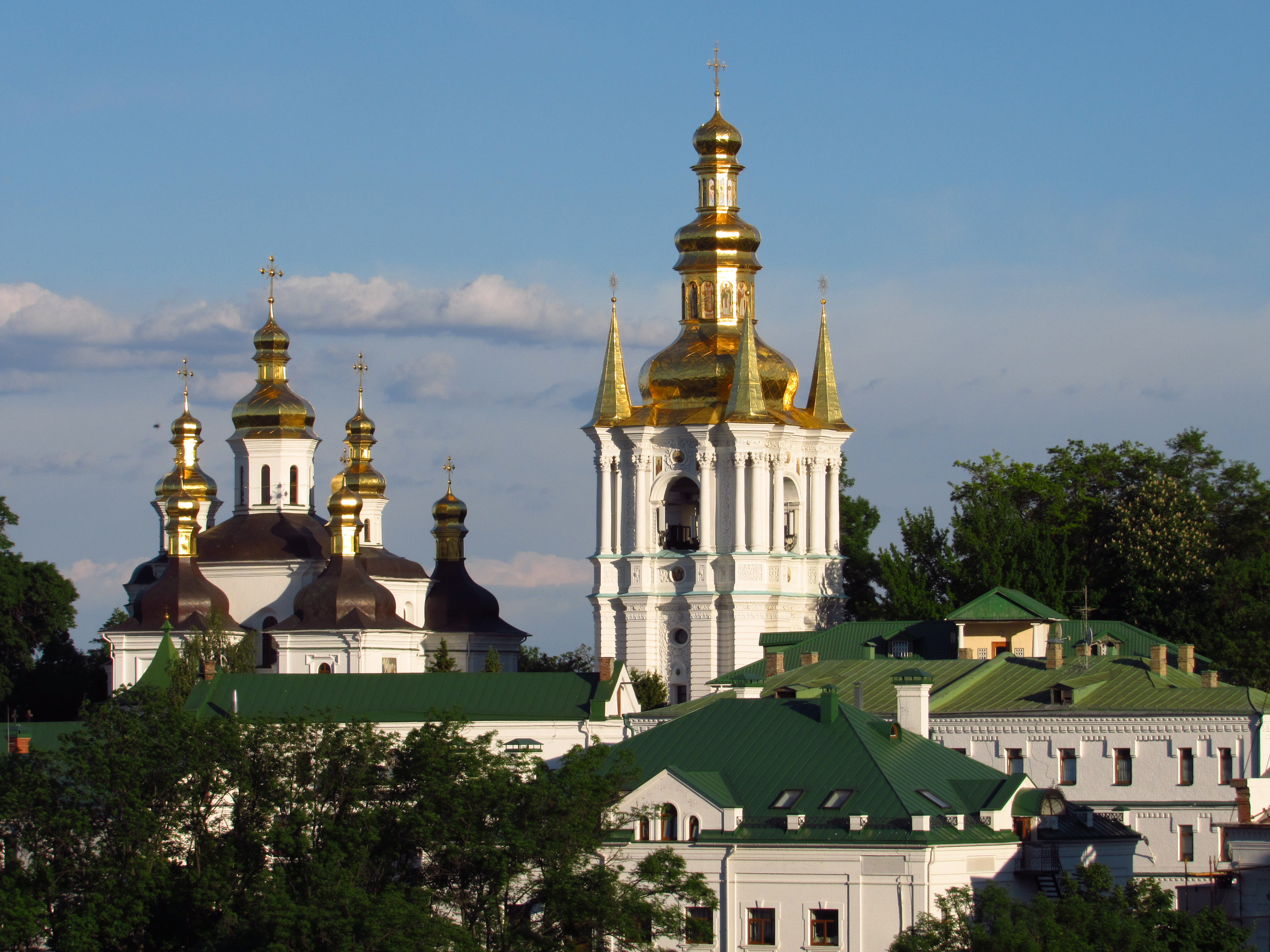

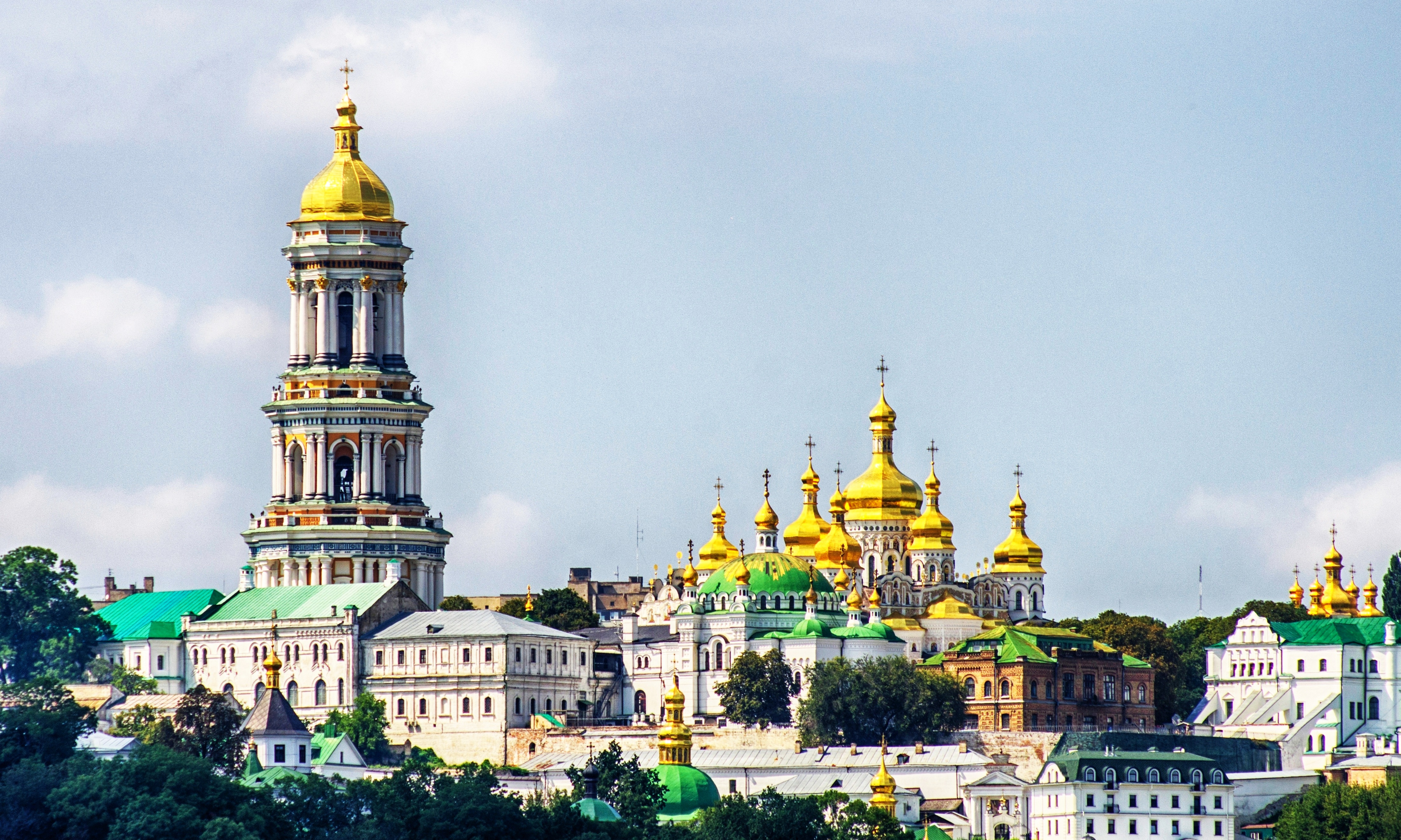

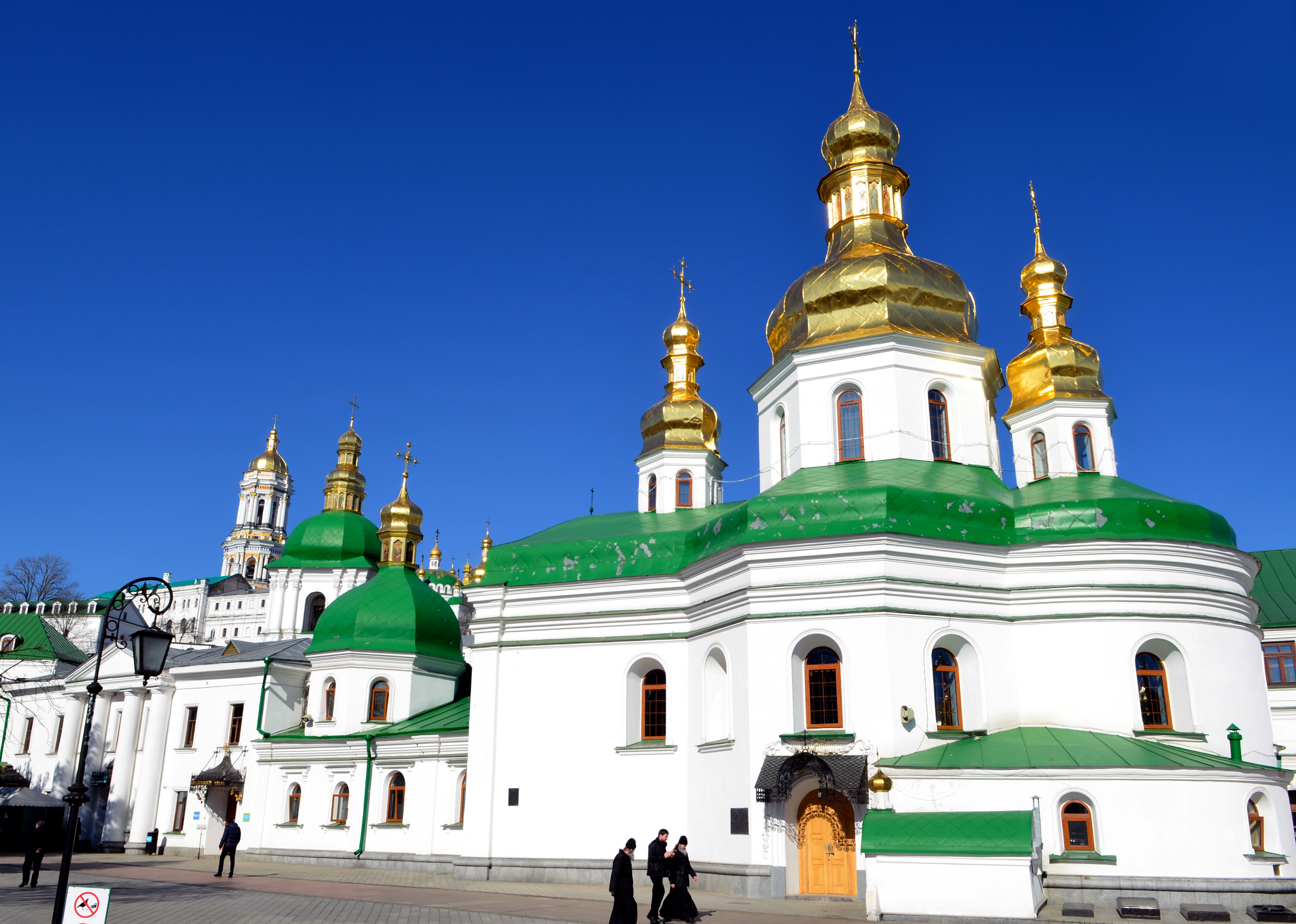

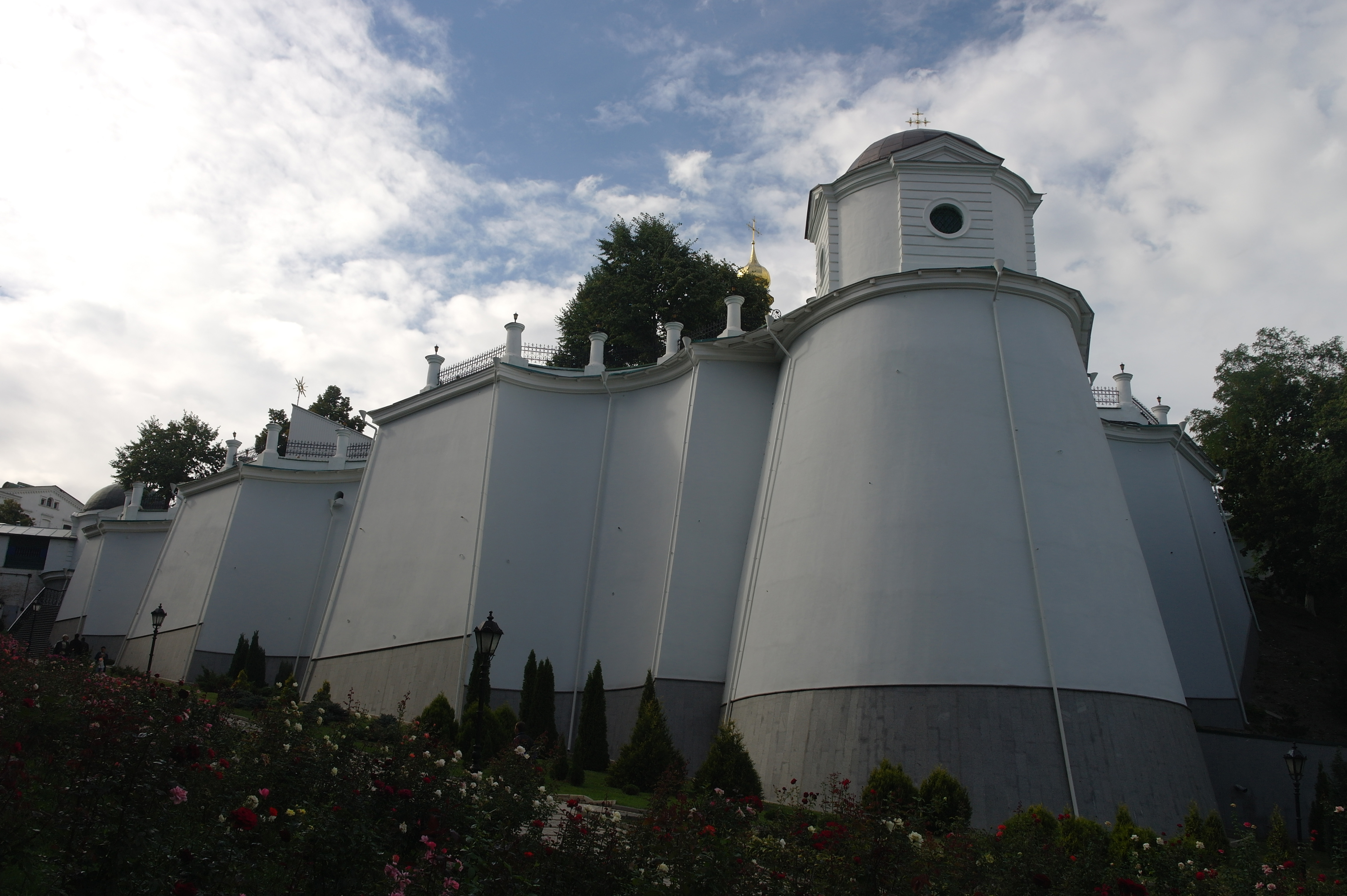

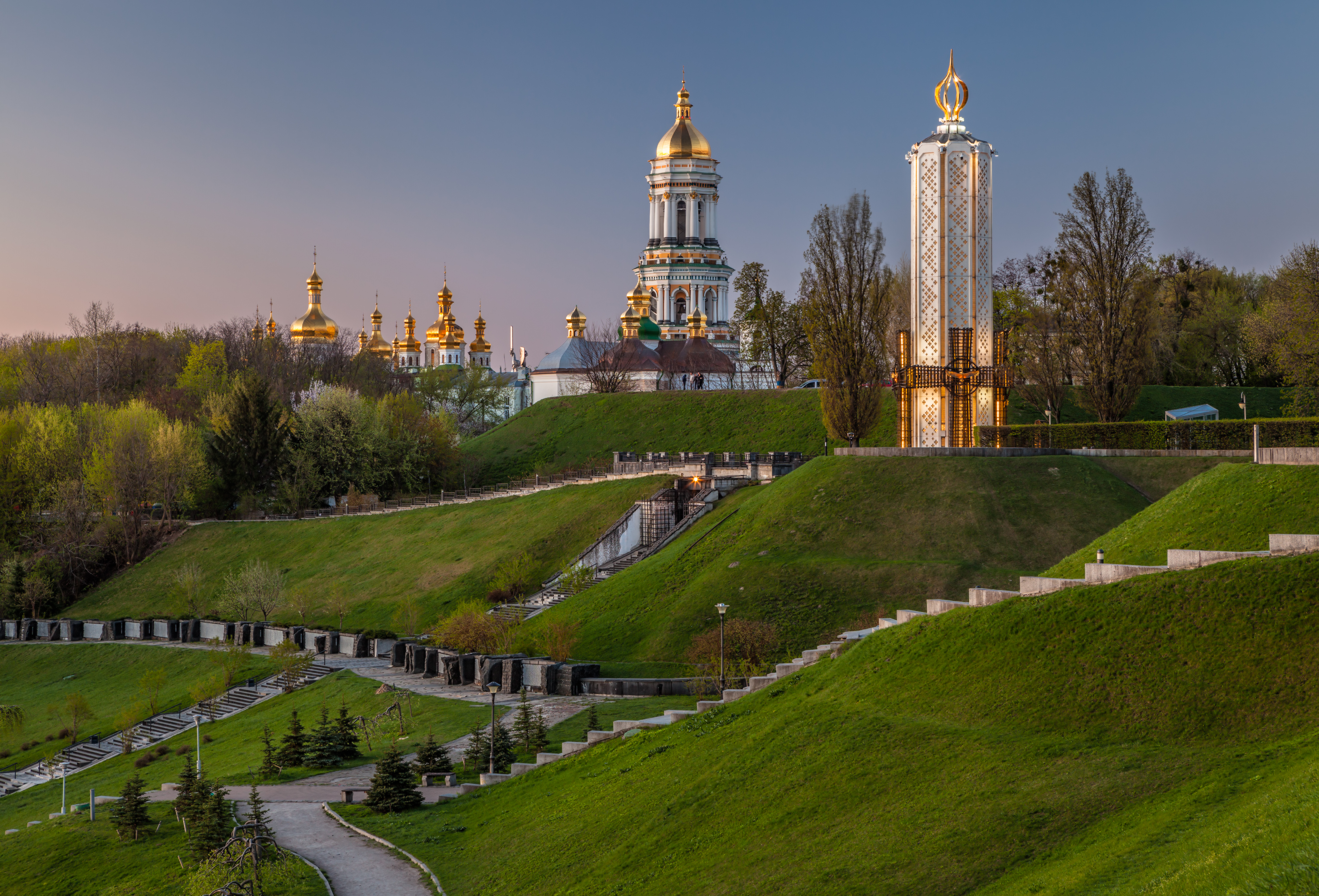

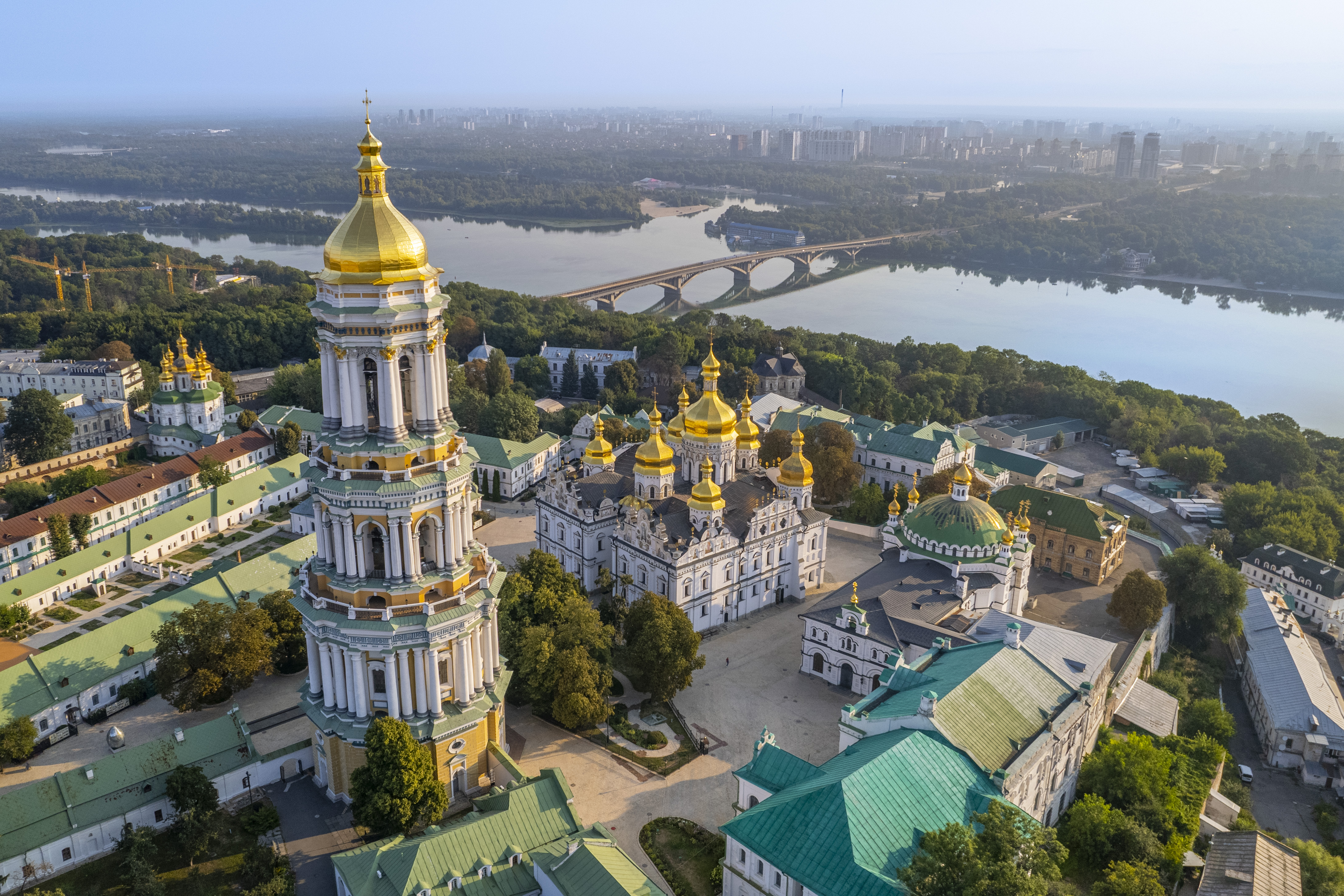

== See also ==
- Šimon
- Yakun
- List of World Heritage Sites in Ukraine
- Crimea – Gold and Secrets of the Black Sea

== Sources ==
=== Primary sources ===
- Cross, Samuel Hazzard; Sherbowitz-Wetzor, Olgerd P. (1953) [1930]. The Russian Primary Chronicle, Laurentian Text. Translated and edited by Samuel Hazzard Cross and Olgerd P. Sherbowitz-Wetzor (PDF). Cambridge, Massachusetts: The Mediaeval Academy of America. p. 325. (The first 50 pages are a scholarly introduction).
- John Herbinius (1675). Religious Kyivan caves or the underground Kyiv (Religiosae Kijovienses Cryptae, Sive Kijovia Subterranea).

=== Secondary sources ===
- Kyiv Pechersk Lavra article in Brockhaus and Efron Encyclopedic Dictionary (1907).
- Kyivan Cave Monastery Archived 23 October 2011 at the Wayback Machine in the Encyclopedia of Ukraine Archived 15 August 2009 at the Wayback Machine.
- Schotkina, Kateryna. "Kyiv Pechersk Lavra: Take away and Divide" in Zerkalo Nedeli, 11–17 November 2006.
