= List of precious commemorative coins of Ukraine =

This is a list of Commemorative and Jubilee coins issued by the Ukrainian government.

Since 1996, the National Bank of Ukraine has been issuing commemorative and commemorative coins made of precious metals. According to the material, they consist of silver, gold, or bimetal, which consists of silver and gold.

A total of 433 commemorative and commemorative coins were issued during the independence of Ukraine.

== Number of coins ==
	1996	1997	1998	1999	2000	2001	2002	2003	2004	2005	2006	2007	2008	2009	2010
Silver	11	3	10	10	7	8	10	11	13	11	17	10	19	16	22
Bi-metallic	–	–	–	–	3	2	–	–	–	–	–	1	–	–	–
Golden	–	6	4	1	1	1	–	2	2	1	5	7	6	3	4

	2011	2012	2013	2014	2015	2016	2017	2018	2019	2020	2021	2022	2023	2024	Total
Silver	23	17	19	16	14	15	11	13	16	17	12	6	12	4	375
Bi-metallic	–	–	–	–	–	–	–	–	–	–	–	–	–	–	6
Golden	3	1	1	–	–	1	–	–	1	–	2	–	–	–	52

== Silver coins ==
=== Ukrainian karbovanets coins of 1996 ===
№	Event/Collection	Value	Mintage number amount	mass of metal in g.	Date of issue	Obverse	Reverse	Series	In honor of
1	50th Anniversary of the United Nations	2 000 000	10 000	31,1	07.03.96			Other coins	United Nations
2	Lesya Ukrainka	1,000,000	10 000	15.55	10.04.96			Outstanding Personalities of Ukraine	Lesya Ukrainka
3	10th anniversary of the disaster at the Chornobyl Nuclear Power Plant	2 000 000	10 000	31.1	25.04.96			Other coins	Chernobyl disaster
4	Bohdan Khmelnytsky	1 000 000	10 000	15,55	21.06.96			Outstanding Personalities of Ukraine	Bohdan Khmelnytsky
5	Hrygoriy Skovoroda	1 000 000	10 000	15,55	21.06.96			Outstanding Personalities of Ukraine	Hrygoriy Skovoroda
6	First Participation in the Summer Olympic Games	2 000 000	10 000	31,1	10.07.96			Sports	1896 Summer Olympics
7	Centennial of Modern Olympic Games	2 000 000	10 000	31,1	10.07.96			Sports	Participation of Ukraine in the 1996 Summer Olympics
8	Independence	2 000 000	10 000	31,1	01.08.96			Rebirth of Ukrainian statehood	Declaration of Independence of Ukraine
9	Mykhaylo Hrushevsky	1 000 000	10 000	15,55	09.08.96			Outstanding Personalities of Ukraine	Mykhaylo Hrushevsky

== Coins of 2, 5, 10, 20, 50, 100, 125, 200, 250, 500 hryvnias ==
=== 1996–1999 years ===
№	Event/Collection	Value	Mintage number amount	mass of metal in g.	Date of issue	Obverse	Reverse	Series	In honor of
10	The Tithe Church	20	5 000	31,1	26.11.96			Spiritual treasures of Ukraine	Church of the Tithes
11	Petro Mohyla	10	5 000	15.55	25.12.96			Outstanding Personalities of Ukraine	Petro Mohyla
12	The Savior Cathedral in Chernihiv	20	5 000	31,1	24.06.97			Spiritual treasures of Ukraine	Transfiguration Cathedral, Chernihiv
13	Cossack Mamai	20	5 000	31,1	23.07.97			Heroes of Cossack Age	Cossack Mamay
14	Kyiv Contract Fair	20	5 000	31,1	16.10.97			Other coins	Kyiv Contract Fair
15	Severyn Nalyvayko	20	5 000	31,1	26.01.98			Heroes of Cossack Age	Severyn Nalyvayko
16	Ski	10	7 500	31,1	12.02.98			Sports	Skiing
17	Biathlon	10	7 500	31,1	16.02.98			Sports	Biathlon
18	Figure Skating	10	7 500	31,1	16.02.98			Sports	Figure skating
19	Askania-Nova	10	10 000	31,1	20.05.98			Flora and fauna	Askania-Nova
20	The Liberation War in the Middle of 17th Century	20	10 000	31,1	25.06.98			Heroes of Cossack Age	Khmelnytsky uprising
21	Kyi	10	10 000	31,1	29.06.98			Princes Ukraine	Kyi
22	Danylo of Halych	10	10 000	31,1	01.07.98			Princes Ukraine	Daniel of Galicia
23	St.Michae`s Golden-Domed Cathedral	10	10 000	31,1	03.12.98			Spiritual treasures of Ukraine	St. Michael's Golden-Domed Monastery
24	The Kyiv-Pechersk Assumption Cathedral	10	10 000	31,1	24.12.98			Spiritual treasures of Ukraine	Dormition Cathedral (Kyiv Pechersk Lavra)
25	Steppe Eagle (Aquila Rapax)	10	5 000	31,1	20.01.99			Flora and fauna	Steppe eagle
26	Dmytro Vyshnevetskyi (Baida)	10	10 000	31,1	31.03.99			Heroes of the Cossack era	Dmytro Vyshnevetskyi
27	Parallel Bars	10	15 000	31,1	30.04.99			Sports	Parallel bars
28	Triple Jump	10	15 000	31,1	30.04.99			Sports	Triple jump
29	Askold	10	10 000	31,1	30.06.99			Princes Ukraine	Askold
30	Butterfly Orchid (PLATANTHERA BIFOLIA)	10	5 000	31,1	26.07.99			Flora and fauna	Platanthera bifolia
31	Petro Doroshenko	10	10 000	31,1	07.09.99			Heroes of the Cossack era	Petro Doroshenko
32	500 Years of the Magdeburg Right in Kyiv	10	10 000	31,1	01.11.99			Spiritual treasures of Ukraine	Magdeburg Right
33	Garden Dormouse (ELIOMYS QUERCINUS)	10	5 000	31,1	15.12.99			Flora and fauna	Garden dormouse
34	Christmas	10	10 000	31,1	29.12.99			2000th anniversary of the Nativity of Christ	Christmas

=== 2000–2004 years ===
№	Event/Collection	Value	Mintage number amount	mass of metal in g.	Date of issue	Obverse	Reverse	Series	In honor of
35	Olha	10	10 000	31,1	19.01.00			Princes Ukraine	Olga of Kiev
36	Petro Sahaidachnyi	10	10 000	31,1	06.03.00			Heroes of the Cossack era	Petro Konashevych-Sahaidachny
37	Freshwater Crab (Potamon Tauricum)	10	5 000	31,1	02.08.00			Flora and fauna	Freshwater crab
38	Volodymyr the Great	10	5 000	31,1	25.09.00			Princely Ukraine	Vladimir the Great
39	Baptizing of Rus	10	10 000	31,1	16.10.00			2000th anniversary of the Nativity of Christ	Christianization of Kievan Rus'
40	100 years of the Lviv Opera and Ballet Theatre	10	3 000	31,1	19.10.00			Other coins	Lviv Opera and Ballet Theatre
41	55 years of Victory in the Second World War	10	3 000	31,1	20.11.00			World War II	World War II
42	Ice Dancing	10	3 000	31,1	30.01.01			Sports	Ice dance
43	Ivan Mazepa	10	3 000	31,1	20.02.01			Heroes of the Cossack era	Ivan Mazepa
44	Yaroslav the Wise	10	3 000	31,1	26.02.01			Princes Ukraine	Yaroslav the Wise
45	10 Years of the National Bank of Ukraine	10	3 000	31,1	29.03.01			Rebirth of Ukrainian statehood	National Bank of Ukraine
46	Lynx lynx	10	6 000	31,1	25.04.01			Flora and fauna	Lynx lynx
47	Hockey	10	15 000	31,1	06.07.01			Sports	Hockey
48	10 Years of the Declaration of Independence of Ukraine	20	1 000	62,2	20.08.01			Rebirth of Ukrainian statehood	Declaration of Independence of Ukraine
49	Khan Palace in Bakhchyserai	10	3 000	31,1	31.10.01			Architectural monuments of Ukraine	Bakhchysarai Palace
50	Polish Larch (Larix Polonica Racib)	10	3 000	31,1	26.11.01			Flora and fauna	Larix decidua
51	Skating	10	3 000	31,1	30.01.02			Sports	Speed skating
52	Ivan Sirko	10	3 000	31,1	26.02.02			Heroes of the Cossack era	Ivan Sirko
53	AN-225 `Mria`aircraft	20	2 000	62,2	30.04.02			Airplanes of Ukraine	Antonov An-225 Mriya
54	Pylyp Orlyk	10	3 000	31,1	30.05.02			Heroes of the Cossack era	Pylyp Orlyk
55	Swimming	10	15 000	31,1	27.06.02			Sports	Swimming
56	Eagle Owl (Bubo Bubo)	10	3 000	31,1	23.07.02			Flora and fauna	Horned owl
57	Sviatoslav	10	3 000	31,1	24.10.02			Princes Ukraine	Sviatoslav
58	Volodymyr Monomakh	10	3 000	31,1	22.11.02			Princes Ukraine	Vladimir II Monomakh
59	Cathedral of Virgin's Nativity in the town of Kozelets	10	3 000	31,1	16.12.02			Architectural monuments of Ukraine	Cathedral of the Nativity of the Theotokos (Kozelets)
60	Celebration of Christmas in Ukraine	10	3 000	31,1	20.12.02			Ritual Festivals of Ukraine	Christmas in Ukraine
61	Pavlo Polubotok	10	3 000	31,1	29.01.03			Heroes of the Cossack era	Pavlo Polubotok
62	Boxing	10	15 000	31,1	28.02.03			Sports	Boxing
63	BISON BONASUS	10	2 000	31,1	31.03.03			Flora and fauna	European bison
64	Easter Holiday	10	3 000	31,1	22.04.03			Ritual Festivals of Ukraine	Easter
65	AN-2 Aircraft	10	3 000	31,1	22.05.03			Airplanes of Ukraine	Antonov An-2
66	Genoese Fortress in the town of Sudak	10	3 000	31,1	30.05.03			Architectural monuments of Ukraine	Genoese fortress, Sudak
67	Seahorse (Hippocampus)	10	2 000	31,1	25.07.03			Flora and fauna	Long-snouted seahorse
68	Livadia Palace	10	3 000	31,1	18.09.03			Architectural monuments of Ukraine	Livadia Palace
69	60 Years of Liberation of Kyiv from Fascist Invaders	20	2 000	62,2	27.10.03			World War II	World War II
70	Pochaiv Laura	10	3 000	31,1	25.11.03			Architectural monuments of Ukraine	Pochaiv Lavra
71	Kyrylo Rozumovskyi	10	3 000	31,1	27.11.03			Heroes of the Cossack era	Kyrylo Rozumovskyi
72	350 Years of the Pereiaslav Cossack Rada of 1654	10	8 000	31,1	05.01.04			Heroes of the Cossack era	Pereiaslav Agreement
73	`Our Spirit Never Can be Downed, Our Striving To Be Free`	20	4 000	62,2	30.01.04			Spiritual Treasures of Ukraine	To the 190th anniversary of the birth of Taras Shevchenko
74	Azov Dolphin	10	8 000	31,1	22.03.04			Flora and fauna	Harbour porpoise
75	2006 Football World Cup	10	5 000	31,1	26.03.04			Sports	2006 FIFA World Cup
76	AN-140 aircraft	10	10 000	31,1	26.04.04			Airplanes of Ukraine	Antonov An-140
77	Heroic Defence of the city of Sevastopol in 1854–1856	10	10 000	31,1	28.04.04			Other coins	Siege of Sevastopol (1854–1855)
78	Whitsunday	10	10 000	31,1	14.05.04			Ritual Festivals of Ukraine	Pentecost
79	28th Olympic Games	20	5 000	62,2	07.07.04			Sports	2004 Summer Olympics
80	170 Years of the Kyiv National University	5	7 000	15,55	26.08.04			Higher educational establishments of Ukraine	Taras Shevchenko National University of Kyiv
81	St.Yur Cathedral	10	8 000	31,1	15.09.04			Architectural monuments of Ukraine	St. George's Cathedral, Lviv
82	200 Years to Kharkiv National University named after V.N.Karazin	5	7 000	15,55	05.10.04			Higher educational establishments of Ukraine	National University of Kharkiv
83	Icebreaker `Captain Belousov`	10	10 000	31,1	16.11.04			Maritime history of Ukraine	Kapitan Belousov (ship, 1954)
84	The Ostrozkyi Family	10	3 000	31,1	01.12.04			Famous families of Ukraine	Ostrogski family

=== 2005–2009 years ===
№	Event/Collection	Value	Mintage number amount	mass of metal in g.	Date of issue	Obverse	Reverse	Series	In honor of
85	60th anniversary of the Victory in the Second World War	20	5 000	62,2	28.04.05			World War II	World War II
86	60 Years of Ukraine Membership in UN	10	5 000	31,1	24.05.05			Other coins	United Nations
87	Ruslan AN-124 Aircraft	20	5 000	62,2	01.06.05			Aircraft of Ukraine	Antonov An-124 Ruslan
88	SPALAX ARENARIUS RESHETNIK	10	8 000	31,1	15.06.05			Flora and fauna	Sandy blind mole-rat
89	Sorochynsky Fair	20	5 000	62,2	17.08.05			Ukrainian heritage	Sorochyntsi Fair
90	National Anthem of Ukraine	10	3 000	31,1	19.08.05			Revival of Ukrainian statehood	National anthem of Ukraine
91	The Protection of the Virgin	10	8 000	31,1	30.09.05			Ritual Festivals of Ukraine	Intercession of the Theotokos
92	100 Years to the Olha Kobylianska Music and Drama Theatre in Chernivtsi	10	5 000	31,1	05.10.05			Other coins	Olha Kobylianska Chernivtsi Drama Theater
93	Sviatohirsk Assumption Lavra Monastery	10	8 000	31,1	20.10.05			Architectural monuments of Ukraine	Sviatohirsk Lavra
94	Baturyn	10	5 000	31,1	16.11.05			Hetman capitals	Baturyn
95	Symyrenko family	10	5 000	31,1	28.11.05			Famous families of Ukraine	Symyrenko family
96	Year of the Dog	5	12 000	15,55	04.01.06			Eastern calendar	Chinese calendar
97	Winter Olympic Games of 2006	10	5 000	31,1	28.02.06			Sports	2006 Winter Olympics
98	Aries	5	10 000	15,55	20.03.06			Zodiac signs	Astrological sign
99	100 Years of the Kyiv National Economic University	5	5 000	15,55	24.03.06			Higher educational establishments of Ukraine	Kyiv National Economic University
100	Taurus	5	10 000	15,55	21.04.06			Zodiac signs	Astrological sign
101	Chyhyryn	10	5 000	31,1	18.05.06			Hetman capitals	Chyhyryn
102	Gemini	5	10 000	15,55	22.05.06			Zodiac signs	Astrological sign
103	Ukrainian Bush Cricket	10	8 000	31,1	14.06.06			Flora and fauna	Poecilimon
104	10 Years of the Constitution of Ukraine	10	5 000	31,1	26.06.06			Revival of Ukrainian statehood	Constitution of Ukraine
105	The 15th anniversary of the Independence of Ukraine	20	7 000	62,2	18.08.06			Revival of Ukrainian statehood	Independence of Ukraine
106	Ivan Franko	5	5 000	15,55	23.08.06			Outstanding Personalities of Ukraine	Ivan Franko
107	The 10th anniversary of the Recovery of Ukrainian Currency Unit – Hryvnia	100	1 501	1000,0	29.08.06			Revival of Ukrainian statehood	Ukrainian hryvnia
108	Dmytro Lutsenko	5	3 000	15,55	08.09.06			Outstanding Personalities of Ukraine	Dmytro Lutsenko
109	10th anniversary of the Clearing House of Ukraine	10	5 000	31,1	14.09.06			Other coins	Accounting Chamber (Ukraine)
110	Mykhailo Hrushevskyi	5	5 000	15,55	27.09.06			Outstanding Personalities of Ukraine	Mykhailo Hrushevsky
111	Saint Cyril Church	10	8 000	31,1	08.11.06			Architectural monuments of Ukraine	St. Cyril's Monastery, Kyiv
112	The Water Baptism	10	10 000	31,1	18.12.06			Ritual Festivals of Ukraine	Vodokreschi
113	Year of the Pig	5	15 000	15,55	02.01.07			Eastern calendar	Chinese calendar
114	Capricorn	5	15 000	15,55	15.01.07			Zodiac signs	Astrological sign
115	Aquarius	5	15 000	15,55	24.01.07			Zodiac signs	Astrological sign
116	Pisces	5	15 000	15,55	15.02.07			Zodiac signs	Astrological sign
117	120 Years of the Odesa State Academic Opera and Ballet Theatre	10	5 000	31,1	25.07.07			Architectural monuments of Ukraine	Odesa Opera and Ballet Theatre
118	Ivan Bohun	10	5 000	31,1	06.09.07			Heroes of the Cossack era	Ivan Bohun
119	Chumatskyi Shliakh	20	5 000	62,2	26.10.07			Ukrainian heritage	Milky Way
120	Holodomor – Genocide of the Ukrainian People	20	10 000	62,2	23.11.07			Other coins	Holodomor
121	Archer	5	15 000	15,55	17.12.07			Zodiac signs	Astrological sign
122	Scorpion	5	15 000	15,55	17.12.07			Zodiac signs	Astrological sign
123	The Year of Rat	5	15 000	15,55	03.01.08			Eastern calendar	Chinese calendar
124	Annunciation	10	8 000	31,1	31.03.08			Ritual Festivals of Ukraine	Annunciation
125	Eurasian Black Vulture	10	7 000	31,1	26.05.08			Flora and fauna	Cinereous vulture
126	225 Years to the city of Sevastopol	10	5 000	31,1	28.05.08			Ancient cities of Ukraine	Sevastopol
127	Swallow`s Nest	10	5 000	31,1	28.05.08			Architectural monuments of Ukraine	Swallow's Nest
128	Cancer	5	15 000	15,55	20.06.08			Zodiac signs	Astrological sign
129	Roman Shukhevych	5	3 000	15,55	26.06.08			Outstanding Personalities of Ukraine	Roman Shukhevych
130	Christianization of Kievan Rus	100	800	1000,0	17.07.08			Other coins	Christianization of Kievan Rus'
131	Leo	5	15 000	15,55	18.07.08			Zodiac signs	Astrological sign
132	Tereschenko Family	10	7 000	31,1	25.07.08			Famous families of Ukraine	Tereshchenko family
133	Virgo	5	15 000	15,55	20.08.08			Zodiac signs	Astrological sign
134	Libra	5	15 000	15,55	19.09.08			Zodiac signs	Astrological sign
135	On the Way to the Independence: Ukrainian-Swedish Politico-Military Alliances of the XVIIth – XVIIIt	10	5 000	31,1	29.09.08			Other coins	Treaty of Korsun; Korsun council
136	In Honor of Ecumenical Patriarch Bartholomew I Visit to Ukraine	50	1 000	500,0	20.10.08			Other coins	Ecumenical Patriarch Bartholomew of Constantinople
137	Decennial of Entry of the Historical Centre of the City of Lviv in the UNESCO World Heritage List	10	5 000	31,1	24.10.08			Spiritual treasures of Ukraine	Old Town (Lviv)
138	Millennium of Mintage in Kyiv	20	5 000	62,2	05.11.08			Ukrainian heritage	Money of Kievan Rus'
139	Hlukhiv	10	7 000	31,1	10.11.08			Hetman capitals	Hlukhiv
140	Church Complex in the Village of Buky	10	5 000	31,1	25.12.08			Revival of Christian spirituality in Ukraine	Saint Eugene church, Buky
141	Maria Prymachenko	5	5 000	15,55	26.12.08			Outstanding Personalities of Ukraine	Maria Prymachenko
142	The Year of the Ox	5	20 000	15,55	05.01.09			Eastern calendar	Chinese calendar
141	Nikolai Gogol	5	5 000	15,55	27.02.09			Outstanding Personalities of Ukraine	Nikolai Gogol
144	SHOLEM ALEICHEM	5	5 000	15,55	27.02.09			Outstanding Personalities of Ukraine	Sholem Aleichem
145	Surb Khach Monastery	10	10 000	31,1	30.03.09			Architectural monuments of Ukraine	Surp Khach Monastery
146	Ukrainian Pysanka	20	8 000	62,2	16.04.09			Ukrainian heritage	Egg decorating in Slavic culture
147	Міжнародний рік астрономії	100	700	1000,0	15.06.09			Other coins	International Year of Astronomy
148	350-th Anniversary of the Battle of Konotop	10	8 000	31,1	19.06.09			Heroes of the Cossack era	Battle of Konotop (1659)
149	70th Anniversary of Proclamation of the Republic of Carpatho-Ukraine	20	3 000	62,2	20.07.09			Revival of Ukrainian statehood	Carpatho-Ukraine
150	Bokorash	10	10 000	31,1	28.07.09			Folk crafts and handicrafts of Ukraine	Raftsmen
151	On Motifs of N.V.Gogol`s Work `Evenings on a Farm Near Dykanka	50	1 500	500,0	10.08.09			Ukrainian heritage	Evenings on a Farm Near Dikanka
152	Ivan Kotliarevskyi	5	5 000	15,55	22.09.09			Outstanding Personalities of Ukraine	Ivan Kotliarevsky
153	Holy Spirit Church in Rohatyn	10	10 000	31,1	29.09.09			Architectural monuments of Ukraine	Holy Spirit church, Rohatyn
154	225 Years of Lviv National Medical University	5	7 000	15,55	28.10.09			Higher educational establishments of Ukraine	Danylo Halytsky Lviv National Medical University
155	Galagan Family	10	7 000	31,1	29.10.09			Famous families of Ukraine	Galagan family
156	75 Years of Kyiv Academic Operetta Theatre	10	5 000	31,1	30.11.09			Other coins	Kyiv National Academic Theatre of Operetta
157	Cartwright	10	10 000	31,1	28.12.09			Folk crafts and handicrafts of Ukraine	Wheelwright

=== 2010–2014 years ===
№	Event/Collection	Value	Mintage number amount	mass of metal in g.	Date of issue	Obverse	Reverse	Series	In honor of
158	Year of the Tiger	5	20 000	15,55	05.01.10			Eastern calendar	Tiger (zodiac)
159	XXI Olympic Winter Games	10	8 000	31,1	25.01.10			Sports	2010 Winter Olympics
160	IVAN PULIUI	5	5 000	15,55	25.01.10			Outstanding personalities of Ukraine	Ivan Puluj
161	Yevhen Paton	5	5 000	15,55	05.02.10			Outstanding personalities of Ukraine	Evgeny Paton
162	Oksana Petrusenko	5	5 000	15,55	05.02.10			Outstanding personalities of Ukraine	Oksana Petrusenko
163	Mykola Pyrohov	5	5 000	15,55	25.03.10			Outstanding personalities of Ukraine	Nikolay Pirogov
164	3rd Centenary of the Constitution of Pylyp Orlyk	10	7 000	31,1	25.03.10			Rebirth of Ukrainian statehood	Constitution of Pylyp Orlyk
165	165 Years of the Lviv Polytechnic National University	10	7 000	31,1	28.05.10			Revival of Christian spirituality in Ukraine	Spiritual Center in Zarvanytsia
166	Zarvanytsia – Maria`s Spiritual Centre	5	5 000	15,55	28.05.10			Higher educational establishments of Ukraine	Lviv Polytechnic
167	Stipa Ucrainica	10	8 000	31,1	29.06.10			Flora and fauna	Stipa ucrainica
168	Zymne Holy Mountain Cloister of the Dormition	20	5 000	62,2	30.06.10			Architectural monuments of Ukraine	Zymne Monastery
169	600 Years of the Battle of Grunwald	20	5 000	62,2	14.07.10			Other coins	Battle of Grunwald
170	Weaver	10	10 000	31,1	28.07.10			Folk crafts and handicrafts of Ukraine	Weaving
171	SPAS	10	10 000	31,1	28.07.10			Ritual Festivals of Ukraine	Apple Feast of the Saviour
172	125 Years of the National Technical University ``Kharkiv Polytechnic Institute``	5	5 000	15,55	30.08.10			Higher educational establishments of Ukraine	Kharkiv Polytechnic Institute
173	Hetman Danylo Apostol	10	8 000	31,1	29.11.10			Heroes of the Cossack era	Danylo Apostol
174	Tarnovskyi Family	10	10 000	31,1	29.11.10			Glorious families of Ukraine	Tarnovskyi Family
175	Johann Georg Pinzel	5	5 000	15,55	29.11.10			Outstanding personalities of Ukraine	Johann Georg Pinsel
176	Potter	10	10 000	31,1	06.12.10			Folk crafts and handicrafts of Ukraine	Pottery
177	Cossack Boat	20	5 000	62,2	20.12.10			Maritime history of Ukraine	Chaika (boat)
178	Island of Khortytsia in the Dnieper – the Cradle of Ukrainian Cossacks	50	1 500	500,0	20.12.10			Ukrainian heritage	Khortytsia
179	Ivan Fedorov	5	5 000	15,55	28.12.10			Outstanding personalities of Ukraine	Ivan Fyodorov (printer)
180	The Year of the Cat (Rabbit, Hare)	5	20 000	15,55	05.01.11			Eastern calendar	Rabbit (zodiac)
181	Pavlo Tychyna	5	5 000	15,55	20.01.11			Outstanding personalities of Ukraine	Pavlo Tychyna
182	350 Years of the Ivan Franko National University of Lviv	5	7 000	15,55	20.01.11			Higher educational establishments of Ukraine	University of Lviv
183	On Motifs of Lesya Ukrainka`s Work ``The Forest Song``	20	4 000	62,2	28.02.11			Ukrainian heritage	The Forest Song
184	Smith	10	10 000	31,1	28.03.11			Folk crafts and handicrafts of Ukraine	Forging
185	Peresopnytsia Gospels	20	4 000	62,2	30.03.11			Spiritual treasures of Ukraine	Peresopnytsia Gospels
186	Heorhii Berehovyi	5	5 000	15,55	08.04.11			Outstanding personalities of Ukraine	Georgy Beregovoy
187	Oleksandr Bohomolets	5	5 000	15,55	29.04.11			Outstanding personalities of Ukraine	Aleksandr Bogomolets
188	ST. ANDREW`S CHURCH	10	8 000	31,1	20.07.11			Architectural monuments of Ukraine	St Andrew's Church, Kyiv
189	Hopak	10	7 000	31,1	29.07.11			Ukrainian heritage	Hopak
190	20 Years of Independence of Ukraine	50	1 000	500,0	19.08.11			Rebirth of Ukrainian statehood	Declaration of Independence of Ukraine
191	Hryhorovych-Barskyi Family	10	5 000	31,1	26.08.11			Glorious families of Ukraine	Ivan Grigorovich-Barsky
192	The Millennial Anniversary of Saint Sophia Cathedral Foundation	50	1 000	500,0	16.09.11			Spiritual treasures of Ukraine	Saint Sophia Cathedral, Kyiv
193	Mykhailo Yangel	5	5 000	15,55	07.10.11			Outstanding personalities of Ukraine	Mikhail Yangel
194	Dniprova Chaika	5	5 000	15,55	25.10.11			Outstanding personalities of Ukraine	Dniprova Chayka
195	150 Years of Ukrainian Railroads	20	4 000	62,2	28.10.11			Other coins	Rail transport in Ukraine
196	International Year of Forests	5	3 000	15,55	24.11.11			Other coins	International Year of Forests
197	UEFA Euro 2012TM Final Tournament. City of Lviv	10	15 000	31,1	01.12.11			Sports	UEFA Euro 2012
198	UEFA Euro 2012TM Final Tournament. City of Kyiv	10	15 000	31,1	01.12.11			Sports	UEFA Euro 2012
199	UEFA Euro 2012TM Final Tournament. City of Kharkiv	10	15 000	31,1	01.12.11			Sports	UEFA Euro 2012
200	UEFA Euro 2012TM Final Tournament. City of Donetsk	10	15 000	31,1	01.12.11			Sports	UEFA Euro 2012
201	UEFA Euro 2012TM Final Tournament	20	15 000	62,2	01.12.11			Sports	UEFA Euro 2012
202	The Year of the Dragon	5	20 000	15,55	16.12.11			Eastern calendar	Dragon (zodiac)
203	Yevhen Hrebinka	5	3 000	15,55	19.01.12			Outstanding personalities of Ukraine	Yevhen Hrebinka
204	Glassblower	10	7 000	31,1	28.02.12			Folk crafts and handicrafts of Ukraine	
205	Oleksa Novakivskyi	5	3 000	15,55	28.02.12			Outstanding personalities of Ukraine	Oleksa Novakivskyi
206	Petro Kalnyshevskyi	10	5 000	31,1	29.03.12			Heroes of the Cossack era	Petro Kalnyshevskyi
207	350 Years of the City of Ivano-Frankivsk	10	3 000	31,1	26.04.12			Ancient cities of Ukraine	Ivano-Frankivsk
208	UEFA EURO 2012TM Poland – Ukraine	10	10 000	31,1	04.06.12			Sports	UEFA Euro 2012
209	200 Years of the Nikitsky Botanical Garden	50	1 000	500,0	26.06.12			Other coins	Nikitsky Botanical Garden
210	80th Anniversary of Donetsk Oblast	10	5 000	31,1	05.07.12			Regions of Ukraine	Donetsk Oblast
211	Games of the XXX Olympiad	10	5 000	31,1	12.07.12			Sports	2012 Summer Olympics
212	Yeletskyi Holy Dormition Cloister	10	7 000	31,1	27.07.12			Architectural monuments of Ukraine	Eletsky Monastery
213	Furrier	10	5 000	31,1	16.08.12			Folk crafts and handicrafts of Ukraine	Fur clothing
214	Navigation in Antiquity	10	5 000	31,1	30.08.12			Maritime history of Ukraine	Sea navigation in Antiquity
215	1 800 Years of the Town of Sudak	10	3 000	31,1	17.09.12			Ancient cities of Ukraine	Sudak
216	Ukrainian Lyric Song	10	5 000	31,1	29.10.12			Ukrainian heritage	Song
217	Zhovkva Synagogue	10	7 000	31,1	22.11.12			Architectural monuments of Ukraine	Great Synagogue (Zhovkva)
218	The Sterlet	10	7 000	31,1	27.11.12			Flora and fauna	Acipenser ruthenus
219	The Year of the Snake	5	25 000	15,55	10.12.12			Eastern calendar	Snake (zodiac)
220	200 Years of Semen Hulak-Artemovsky	20	4 000	62,2	15.02.13			Outstanding personalities of Ukraine	Semen Hulak-Artemovsky
221	Volodymyr Vernadsky	5	5 000	15,55	25.02.13			Outstanding personalities of Ukraine	Vladimir Vernadsky
222	1 000 Years of the Liadova Cave Monastery	20	3 000	62,2	17.04.13			Spiritual treasures of Ukraine	Lyadova Monastery
223	The Great Bustard	10	5 000	31,1	26.04.13			Flora and fauna	Great bustard
224	The House with Chimeras	10	5 000	31,1	15.05.13			Architectural monuments of Ukraine	House with Chimaeras
225	Maternity	5	10 000	15,55	18.06.13			Other coins	Mother
226	1025th Anniversary of Christianization of Kyivan Rus	20	3 500	62,2	03.07.13			Other coins	Christianization of Kievan Rus'
227	Ukrainian Vyshyvanka	10	5 000	31,1	20.08.13			Ukrainian heritage	Vyshyvanka
228	Liberation of Kharkiv from the Fascist Invaders	10	3 000	31,1	21.08.13			World War II	World War II
229	650th Anniversary of the First Record of the City of Vinnytsia	10	3 000	31,1	28.08.13			Ancient cities of Ukraine	Vinnytsia
230	150th Anniversary of the National Philharmonic Society of Ukraine	5	3 000	15,55	12.09.13			Other coins	National Philharmonic of Ukraine
231	Liberation of Donbas from the Fascist Invaders	10	3 000	31,1	30.09.13			World War II	World War II
232	Battle of the Dnieper	50	1 000	500	30.10.13			World War II	Battle of the Dnieper
233	100 Years of P.I.Tchaikovsky National Music Academy of Ukraine	5	3 000	15,55	03.11.13			Higher educational establishments of Ukraine	Ukrainian National Tchaikovsky Academy of Music
234	Mykola Amosov	5	5 000	15,55	26.11.13			Outstanding personalities of Ukraine	Nikolai Amosov
235	Year of the Horse	5	25 000	15,55	10.12.13			Eastern calendar	Horse (zodiac)
236	Catherine`s Glory Ship of the Line	10	5 000	31,1	18.12.13			Maritime history of Ukraine	Slava Kateryny Battleship
237	900th Anniversary of the Tale of Bygone Years	10	3 000	31,1	20.12.13			Spiritual treasures of Ukraine	Primary Chronicle
238	1120 Years of the City of Uzhhorod	10	2 000	31,1	25.12.13			Ancient cities of Ukraine	Uzhhorod
239	XXII Olympic Winter Games	10	2 000	31,1	03.02.14			Sports	2014 Winter Olympics
240	Korsun-Shevchenkovsky Offensive	20	2 500	62,2	17.02.14			World War II	Battle of Korsun–Cherkassy
241	200th Anniversary of T.H.Shevchenko`s Birth	50	1 000	500	07.03.14			Spiritual treasures of Ukraine	Taras Shevchenko
242	Aries (Little Ram)	2	10 000	7,78	20.03.14			Children's Zodiac	Aries (astrology)
243	Taurus (Little Bull)	2	10 000	7,78	18.04.14			Children's Zodiac	Taurus (astrology)
244	Gemini (Little Twins)	2	10 000	7,78	20.05.14			Children's Zodiac	Gemini (astrology)
245	220 Years of the City of Odesa	10	3 000	31,1	28.05.14			Ancient cities of Ukraine	Odesa
246	Cancer (Little Crayfish)	2	10 000	7,78	20.06.14			Children's Zodiac	Cancer (astrology)
247	Leo (Little Lion)	2	10 000	7,78	18.07.14			Children's Zodiac	Leo (astrology)
248	180 Years of Taras Shevchenko National University of Kyiv	5	3 000	15,55	31.07.14			Higher educational establishments of Ukraine	Taras Shevchenko National University of Kyiv
249	Virgo (Little Girl)	2	10 000	7,78	18.08.14			Children's Zodiac	Virgo (astrology)
250	On Motifs of O.P.Dovzhenko`s Works	20	2 000	62,2	22.08.14			Spiritual treasures of Ukraine	Alexander Dovzhenko
251	Cyclamen coum (Kuznetzovii)	10	3 000	31,1	30.09.14			Flora and fauna	Cyclamen coum
252	700 Years of Ozbek Han Mosque and Madrasa	10	2 000	31,1	10.10.14			Architectural monuments of Ukraine	Ozbek Han Mosque
253	70th Anniversary of Ukraine`s Liberation from Fascist Invaders	20	2 000	62,2	21.10.14			World War II	World War II
254	Year of the Goat	5	20 000	15,55	10.12.14			Eastern calendar	Goat (zodiac)

=== 2015–2019 years ===
№	Event/Collection	Value	Mintage number amount	mass of metal in g.	Date of issue	Obverse	Reverse	Series	In honor of
255	Aquarius (Little Water Carrier)	2	10 000	7,78	19.01.15			Children's Zodiac	Aquarius (astrology)
256	Pisces (Little Fish)	2	10 000	7,78	16.02.15			Children's Zodiac	Pisces (astrology)
257	150 Years of the Odesa Illia Mechnikov National University	5	2 000	15,55	28.04.15			Higher educational establishments of Ukraine	Odesa University
258	Volodymyr the Great, Grand Duke of Kyiv	20	2 000	62,2	24.07.15			Other coins	Volodymyr the Great
259	475th Anniversary of the First Record of the City of Ternopil	10	2 000	31,1	20.08.15			Ancient cities of Ukraine	Ternopil
260	400 Years of the National University of Kyiv-Mohyla Academy	5	2 000	15,55	15.09.15			Higher educational establishments of Ukraine	National University of Kyiv-Mohyla Academy
261	Libra (Little Scales)	2	10 000	7,78	21.09.15			Children's Zodiac	Libra (astrology)
262	PIDHIRTSI CASTLE	10	2 000	31,1	23.09.15			Architectural monuments of Ukraine	Pidhirtsi Castle
263	OLESHKY SANDS	10	3 000	31,1	23.09.15			Other coins	Oleshky Sands National Nature Park
264	Scorpio (Little Scorpion)	2	10 000	7,78	22.10.15			Children's Zodiac	Scorpio (astrology)
265	Sagittarius (Little Archer)	2	10 000	7,78	19.11.15			Children's Zodiac	Sagittarius (astrology)
266	The Year of the Monkey	5	20 000	15,55	10.12.15			Eastern calendar	Monkey (zodiac)
267	Capricorn (Little Goat)	2	10 000	7,78	18.12.15			Children's Zodiac	Capricorn (astrology)
268	Bohdan Khmelnytskyi	10	3 000	31,1	24.12.15			Heroes of the Cossack era	Bohdan Khmelnytskyi
269	Shchedryk	20	3 000	62,2	05.01.16			Ukrainian heritage	Shchedryk
270	Theodosius of the Caves	10	3 000	31,1	19.04.16			Spiritual treasures of Ukraine	Theodosius of Kiev
271	Games of the ХХХІ Olympiad	10	3 500	31,1	28.04.16			Sports	2016 Summer Olympics
272	Remembrance for the Victims of Crimean Tatar Genocide	10	2 000	31,1	12.05.16			Other coins	Deportation of the Crimean Tatars
273	PETRYKIVKA PAINTING	10	5 000	31,1	20.05.16			Ukrainian heritage	Petrykivka painting
274	20 Years Since the Adoption of the Ukrainian Constitution	5	3 000	15,55	20.06.16			Rebirth of Ukrainian statehood	Constitution of Ukraine
275	50 Years Since the Establishment of the Ternopil National Economic University	5	2 000	15,55	23.06.16			Higher educational establishments of Ukraine	West Ukrainian National University
276	Lady`s Slipper Orchid	10	3 000	31,1	20.07.16			Flora and fauna	Cypripedium calceolus
277	25 Years of Ukraine`s Independence	20	3 500	62,2	17.08.16			Rebirth of Ukrainian statehood	Declaration of Independence of Ukraine
278	70 Years of Kyiv National University of Trade and Economics	5	2 000	15,55	30.09.16			Higher educational establishments of Ukraine	Kyiv National University of Trade and Economics
279	The Peacock	5	4 000	15,55	09.11.16			Fauna in cultural monuments of Ukraine	Pavo (bird)
280	The Wolf	5	4 000	15,55	09.11.16			Fauna in cultural monuments of Ukraine	Wolf
281	The Deer	5	4 000	15,55	09.11.16			Fauna in cultural monuments of Ukraine	Cervus
282	The Year of the Rooster	5	20 000	15,55	09.12.16			Eastern calendar	Rooster (zodiac)
283	ST. NICHOLAS CATHEDRAL (CITY OF KYIV)	10	3 000	31,1	19.12.16			Architectural monuments of Ukraine	St. Nicholas Roman Catholic Church, Kyiv
284	The Auroch	5	4 000	15,55	15.03.17			Fauna in cultural monuments of Ukraine	Aurochs
285	The Lion	5	4 000	15,55	11.04.17			Fauna in cultural monuments of Ukraine	Lion
286	Kamianets-Podilskyi Castle	10	3 000	31,1	17.05.17			Architectural monuments of Ukraine	Kamianets-Podilskyi Castle
287	The Snake	5	4 000	15,55	25.05.17			Fauna in cultural monuments of Ukraine	Snake
288	The Marbled Polecat	10	3 000	31,1	01.06.17			Flora and fauna	Marbled polecat
289	The Wheel of Life	10	4 000	31,1	25.07.17			Other coins	Existence
290	Kosiv Painting Style	10	3 500	31,1	15.08.17			Ukrainian heritage	Kosiv painted ceramics
291	St. Catherine`s Church in Chernihiv	10	2 500	31,1	18.09.17			Architectural monuments of Ukraine	Catherine's Church, Chernihiv
292	Archangel Michael	1	10 000	31,1	12.10.17			Other coins	Michael (archangel)
293	150 Years since the Establishment of the Taras Shevchenko National Opera of Ukraine	20	2 000	62,2	27.10.17			Spiritual treasures of Ukraine	National Opera of Ukraine
294	100 years since the establishment of the National Academy of Fine Arts and Architecture	5	2 500	15,55	07.12.17			Higher educational establishments of Ukraine	National Academy of Visual Arts and Architecture
295	The ХХІІІ Olympic Winter Games	10	5 000	31,1	10.01.18			Sports	2018 Winter Olympics
296	Liubomyr Huzar	5	2 000	15,55	15.02.18			Outstanding personalities of Ukraine	Liubomyr Huzar
297	The Boar	5	4 000	15,55	27.02.18			Fauna in cultural monuments of Ukraine	Wild boar
298	The Dolphin	5	4 000	15,55	27.02.18			Fauna in cultural monuments of Ukraine	Common dolphin
299	The АN-132	10	3 500	31,1	11.03.18			Aircraft of Ukraine	Antonov/Taqnia An-132
300	Digging up Potatoes	10	4 000	31,1	22.05.18			Other coins	Potato
301	The Dnieper Barbel	10	2 500	31,1	05.06.18			Flora and fauna	Dnieper barbel
302	100 Years since the Establishment of Ukraine's National Academy of Sciences	20	2 500	62,2	10.10.18			Other coins	National Academy of Sciences of Ukraine
303	The Human, Time, Space	5	4 000	15,55	14.11.18			Other coins	Epoch
304	The Era of Technologies	5	4 000	15,55	14.11.18			Other coins	Epoch
305	The Era of Peace	5	4 000	15,55	14.11.18			Other coins	Epoch
306	The Era of Changes	5	4 000	15,55	14.11.18			Other coins	Epoch
307	Medzhybizh Castle	10	3 000	31,1	27.11.18			Architectural monuments of Ukraine	Medzhybizh Fortress
308	The Horse	5	4 000	15,55	26.02.19			Fauna in cultural monuments of Ukraine	Equus (genus)
309	Palanok Castle	10	3 000	31,1	26.02.19			Architectural monuments of Ukraine	Palanok Castle
310	The Ram	5	4 000	15,55	14.03.19			Fauna in cultural monuments of Ukraine	Ovis
311	The Issuing of a Tomos on the Autocephaly of the Ukrainian Orthodox Church	20	4 000	62,2	25.03.19			Spiritual Treasures of Ukraine	Tomos (Eastern Orthodox Church)
312	The Mhar Savior-Transfiguration Monastery	10	2 500	31,1	21.05.19			Architectural monuments of Ukraine	Mhar Monastery
313	The White-Tailed Eagle	10	2 500	31,1	10.07.19			Flora and fauna	White-tailed eagle
314	The Issuing of a Tomos on the Autocephaly of the Ukrainian Orthodox Church	50	1 000	500,0	22.07.19			Spiritual Treasures of Ukraine	Tomos (Eastern Orthodox Church)
315	1,000 Years since the Rule of Kyiv Prince Yaroslav the Wise Began	20	2 500	62,2	06.08.19			Princes of Ukraine	Yaroslav the Wise
316	Mother Earth	10	4 000	31,1	20.08.19			Other coins	Earth
317	The Bird	2	5 000	7,78	20.11.19			Ukrainian heritage	Yavoriv toy
318	The Horse	2	5 000	7,78	20.11.19			Ukrainian heritage	Yavoriv toy
319	The Walking Couple	2	5 000	7,78	20.11.19			Ukrainian heritage	Yavoriv toy
320	The Pectoral Set	10	4 000	31,1	23.12.19			Spiritual treasures of Ukraine	Golden Pectoral from Tovsta Mohyla
321	The Pectoral Set	10	4 000	31,1	23.12.19			Spiritual treasures of Ukraine	Golden Pectoral from Tovsta Mohyla
322	The Pectoral Set	10	4 000	31,1	23.12.19			Spiritual treasures of Ukraine	Golden Pectoral from Tovsta Mohyla
323	The Pectoral Set	10	4 000	31,1	23.12.19			Spiritual treasures of Ukraine	Golden Pectoral from Tovsta Mohyla

=== 2020–2024 years ===
№	Event/Collection	Value	Mintage number amount	mass of metal in g.	Date of issue	Obverse	Reverse	Series	In honor of
324	100 Years since the Establishment of the Ivan Franko National Academic Drama Theater	10	2 500	31,1	23.01.20			Spiritual treasures of Ukraine	Ivan Franko National Academic Drama Theater
325	Zolochiv Castle	10	3 000	31,1	19.02.20			Architectural monuments of Ukraine	Zolochiv Castle
326	St. Michael's Vydubychi Monastery	10	3 000	31,1	16.04.20			Spiritual treasures of Ukraine	Vydubychi Monastery
327	1075 Years since the Rule of Princess Olha Began	20	2 500	62,2	14.05.20			Princes of Ukraine	Olga of Kiev
328	The Malachite Moth	10	2 500	31,1	02.06.20			Flora and fauna	Staurophora celsia
329	The ХХXІІ Olympic Games	10	4 000	31,1	22.07.20			Sports	2020 Summer Olympics
330	Samiilo Velychko	10	3 000	31,1	01.12.20			Heroes of the Cossack era	Samiilo Velychko
331	The Irmologion as the Spiritual Heritage of Ukraine and Belarus	20	2 500	62,2	15.12.20			Spiritual treasures of Ukraine	Supraśl Irmologion
	Eneida Set of Commemorative Coins	90	1200	279,9	29.12.20			Spiritual treasures of Ukraine	Eneida
332	Eneida — 1	10	1200	31,1	29.12.20			Spiritual treasures of Ukraine	Eneida
333	Eneida — 2	10	1200	31,1	29.12.20			Spiritual treasures of Ukraine	Eneida
334	Eneida — 3	10	1200	31,1	29.12.20			Spiritual treasures of Ukraine	Eneida
335	Eneida — 4	10	1200	31,1	29.12.20			Spiritual treasures of Ukraine	Eneida
336	Eneida — 5	10	1200	31,1	29.12.20			Spiritual treasures of Ukraine	Eneida
337	Eneida — 6	10	1200	31,1	29.12.20			Spiritual treasures of Ukraine	Eneida
338	Eneida — 7	10	1200	31,1	29.12.20			Spiritual treasures of Ukraine	Eneida
339	Eneida — 8	10	1200	31,1	29.12.20			Spiritual treasures of Ukraine	Eneida
340	Eneida — 9	10	1200	31,1	29.12.20			Spiritual treasures of Ukraine	Eneida
341	The 150th Anniversary of the Birth of Lesia Ukrainka	20	2500	62.2	21.01.21			Spiritual treasures of Ukraine	Lesya Ukrainka
342	The Reshetylivka Carpet-Making Style	10	3000	31.1	15.04.21			Ukrainian heritage	Reshetylivka Carpet Weaving
343	Kyiv Fortress	10	3000	31.1	14.05.21			Architectural monuments of Ukraine	Kyiv Fortress
344	Inheritance	10	4000	31.1	09.06.21			Other coins	Cultural heritage
345	The 25th Anniversary of the Ukrainian Constitution	10	2500	31.1	21.06.21			Rebirth of Ukrainian statehood	Constitution of Ukraine
346	The 30th Anniversary of Ukraine's Independence	10	3000	31,1	17.08.21			Rebirth of Ukrainian statehood	Independence of Ukraine
347	The 30th Anniversary of Ukraine's Independence	50	500	500	17.08.21			Rebirth of Ukrainian statehood	Independence of Ukraine
348	Olesko Castle	10	3000	31,1	17.08.21			Architectural monuments of Ukraine	Olesko Castle
349	80 Years Since the Babyn Yar Tragedy	10	3000	31,1	27.09.21			Other coins	Babi Yar
	Set of commemorative coins Cossack Regalia	40	2000	124.4	30.12.21			Rebirth of Ukrainian statehood	Items of Ukrainian Cossacks
350	Cossack Regalia — 1	10	2000	31,1	30.12.21			Rebirth of Ukrainian statehood	Items of Ukrainian Cossacks
351	Cossack Regalia — 2	10	2000	31,1	30.12.21			Rebirth of Ukrainian statehood	Items of Ukrainian Cossacks
352	Cossack Regalia — 3	10	2000	31,1	30.12.21			Rebirth of Ukrainian statehood	Items of Ukrainian Cossacks
353	Cossack Regalia — 4	10	2000	31,1	30.12.21			Rebirth of Ukrainian statehood	Items of Ukrainian Cossacks
354	XXIV зимові Олімпійські ігри	10	2500	31,1	18.01.22			Sports	2022 Winter Olympics
355	In Unity, Strength	10	5000	31,1	11.07.22			My Immortal Ukraine	
356	Oh, the Guelder-Rose in the Meadow	10	5000	31,1	18.07.22			My Immortal Ukraine	Oi u luzi chervona kalyna
357	The Granting of the Status of Candidate for EU Membership	10	5000	31,1	18.11.22			Other coins	Ukraine–European Union relations
358	The Garden of Divine Songs	20	2500	62,2	22.11.22			Spiritual treasures of Ukraine	The garden of divine songs (a collection of poems)
359	Archangel Michael	10	5000	31,1	14.12.22			Other coins	Michael (archangel)
360	Born in Ukraine	5	5000	15,55	01.06.23			Other coins	Ukrainians
361	The Courage To Be. UA	10	5000	31,1	23.08.23			My Immortal Ukraine	Ukrainian resistance in Russian-occupied Ukraine
362	Friendship and Brotherhood are the Greatest of Riches (a set of two commemorative coins)	10	10 000	62,2	24.08.23			My Immortal Ukraine	Poland–Ukraine relations
363	Ukrainian Borshch	10	2500	31.1	29.09.23			Ukrainian heritage	Borscht
364	Female Defenders	10	2500	31.1	02.10.23			My Immortal Ukraine	Ukrainians Female Defenders
365	The Ukrainian Language	10	5000	31.1	27.10.23			Spiritual treasures of Ukraine	Ukrainian language
	The Schedryk Carol – The Carol of the Bells (a set of three commemorative coins)	30	5000	93,3	21.12.23			Ukrainian heritage	Shchedryk
366	The Schedryk Carol – 1	10	5000	31.1	21.12.23			Ukrainian heritage	Shchedryk
367	The Schedryk Carol – 2	10	5000	31.1	21.12.23			Ukrainian heritage	Shchedryk
368	The Schedryk Carol – 3	10	5000	31.1	21.12.23			Ukrainian heritage	Shchedryk
369	Archangel Michael	10	10000	31.1	26.12.23			Other coins	Michael (archangel)
	St. Volodymyr's Cathedral in Kyiv (a set of two commemorative coins)	20	2500	62,2	27.12.23			Architectural monuments of Ukraine	St Volodymyr's Cathedral
370	St. Volodymyr's Cathedral in Kyiv – 1	10	2500	31.1	27.12.23			Architectural monuments of Ukraine	St Volodymyr's Cathedral
371	St. Volodymyr's Cathedral in Kyiv – 2	10	2500	31.1	27.12.23			Architectural monuments of Ukraine	St Volodymyr's Cathedral
372	Love	10	10000	31.1	04.04.24			Other coins	Love
373	Parental Happiness	5	7500	15.55	29.04.24			Other coins	Parental happiness
374	Ornek. A Crimean Tatar Ornament	10	7500	31.1	23.05.24			Ukrainian heritage	Ornek
375	A Drop of Life	10	5000	31.1	14.06.24			Other coins	Blood donation

== Bimetallic coins of precious metals ==
№	Event/Collection	Value	Mintage number amount	mass of metal in g.	Date of issue	Obverse	Reverse	Series	In honor of
1	Paleolith	20	3 000	14,7	20.12.00			Points of interest of ancient cultures of Ukraine	Paleolith
2	Trypillia	20	3 000	14,7	20.12.00			Points of interest of ancient cultures of Ukraine	Trypillia
3	Olbia	20	3 000	14,7	26.12.00			Points of interest of ancient cultures of Ukraine	Pontic Olbia
4	Scythia	20	2 000	14,7	30.10.01			Points of interest of ancient cultures of Ukraine	Scythia
5	Kyivan Rus	20	2 000	14,7	25.12.01			Points of interest of ancient cultures of Ukraine	Kievan Rus'
6	Clear Water – a Spring of Life	20	3 000	14,8	25.05.07			Other coins	Drinking water

== Gold coins ==
№	Event/Collection	Value	Mintage number amount	mass of metal in g.	Date of issue	Obverse	Reverse	Series	In honor of
1	T.H.Shevchenko	200	10 000	15,55	12.03.97			Outstanding Personalities of Ukraine	Taras Shevchenko
2	Kyiv-Pechersk Lavra	200	20 000	15,55	10.04.97			Spiritual Treasures of Ukraine	Kyiv-Pechersk Lavra
3	Orante 50	50	2 000	3,11	28.07.97			Spiritual Treasures of Ukraine	Orans
4	Orante 125	125	4 000	7,78	28.07.97			Spiritual Treasures of Ukraine	Orans
5	Orante 250	250	3 000	15,55	28.07.97			Spiritual Treasures of Ukraine	Orans
6	Orante 500	500	1 000	31,1	28.07.97			Spiritual Treasures of Ukraine	Orans
7	Kyiv Psalmbook	100	2 000	15,55	22.01.98			Spiritual Treasures of Ukraine	Kiev Psalter of 1397
8	Aeneid	100	2 000	15,55	28.10.98			Spiritual Treasures of Ukraine	Eneida
9	St.Michae`s Golden-Domed Cathedral	100	3 000	15,55	28.12.98			Spiritual Treasures of Ukraine	St. Michael's Golden-Domed Monastery
10	Kyiv-Pechersk Assumption Cathedral	100	3 000	15,55	30.12.98			Spiritual Treasures of Ukraine	Dormition Cathedral (Kyiv Pechersk Lavra)
11	Christmas	50	3 000	15,55	29.12.99			2000 Years of Christmas	Christmas
12	Baptizing of Rus	50	3 000	15,55	16.10.00			2000 Years of Christmas	Christianization of Kievan Rus'
13	10 Years of Independence of Ukraine	10	3 000	3,88	20.08.01			Rebirth of Ukrainian statehood	Independence of Ukraine
14	Pectoral	100	1 500	31,1	28.07.03			Spiritual Treasures of Ukraine	Golden Pectoral from Tovsta Mohyla
15	Salamander	2	10 000	1,24	08.12.03			The Smallest Golden Coin	Fire salamander
16	Stork	2	10 000	1,24	23.04.04			The Smallest Golden Coin	Stork
17	Golden Gates	100	2 000	31,1	29.06.04			Architectural monuments of Ukraine	Golden Gate, Kyiv
18	Scythian Gold	2	15 000	1,24	26.04.05			Signs of the zodiac	Crimea – Gold and Secrets of the Black Sea
19	Aries	2	10 000	1,24	20.03.06			Signs of the zodiac	Aries (constellation)
20	Hedgehog	2	10 000	1,24	14.04.06			The Smallest Golden Coin	Erinaceus
21	Taurus	2	10 000	1,24	21.04.06			Signs of the zodiac	Taurus (constellation)
22	Gemini	2	10 000	1,24	22.05.06			Signs of the zodiac	Gemini (constellation)
23	Nestor – the Chronicler	50	5 000	15,55	27.12.06			Spiritual Treasures of Ukraine	Nestor the Chronicler
24	Capricorn	2	10 000	1,24	15.01.07			Signs of the zodiac	Capricornus
25	Aquarius	2	10 000	1,24	24.01.07			Signs of the zodiac	Aquarius (constellation)
26	Pisces	2	10 000	1,24	15.02.07			Signs of the zodiac	Pisces (constellation)
27	Marmot	2	10 000	1,24	01.03.07			The Smallest Golden Coin	Bobak marmot
28	The Ostroh Bible	100	4 000	31,1	15.11.07			Spiritual Treasures of Ukraine	Ostrog Bible
29	Scorpion	2	10 000	1,24	17.12.07			Signs of the zodiac	Scorpius
30	Archer	2	10 000	1,24	17.12.07			Signs of the zodiac	Sagittarius (constellation)
31	Skythian Gold (The Goddess Api)	2	10 000	1,24	22.02.08			The Smallest Golden Coin	Scythian religion
32	Swallow`s Nest	50	4 000	15,55	28.05.08			Architectural monuments of Ukraine	Swallow's Nest
33	Cancer	2	10 000	1,24	20.06.08			Signs of the zodiac	Cancer (constellation)
34	Leo	2	10 000	1,24	18.07.08			Signs of the zodiac	Leo (constellation)
35	Virgo	2	10 000	1,24	20.08.08			Signs of the zodiac	Virgo (constellation)
36	Libra	2	10 000	1,24	19.09.08			Signs of the zodiac	Libra (constellation)
37	Turtle	2	10 000	1,24	29.04.09			The Smallest Golden Coin	Turtle
38	Chersonesos Taurica	100	3 000	31,1	28.07.09			Ancient monuments of Ukraine	Chersonesus
39	Scythian Gold. The Wild Boar	2	10 000	1,24	24.12.09			The Smallest Golden Coin	Crimea – Gold and Secrets of the Black Sea
40	Bee	2	10 000	1,24	25.03.10			The Smallest Golden Coin	Bee
41	Ukrainian Ballet	50	4 000	15,55	30.04.10			Ukrainian heritage	Ballet
42	The Bosporan Kingdom	100	3 000	31,1	28.07.10			Ancient monuments of Ukraine	Bosporan Kingdom
43	Chervona Kalyna	2	10 000	1,24	24.09.10			The Smallest Golden Coin	Viburnum
44	Scythian Gold. The Deer	2	10 000	1,24	30.06.11			The Smallest Golden Coin	Crimea – Gold and Secrets of the Black Sea
45	20 Years of Independence of Ukraine	100	1 000	31,1	19.08.11			Rebirth of Ukrainian statehood	Independence of Ukraine
46	UEFA European Football Championship – 2012 Final Tournament	500	110	500,0	16.12.11			Sports	UEFA Euro 2012
47	Malva	2	8 000	1,24	31.05.12			Flora and fauna	Malva
48	1025th Anniversary of Christianization of Kyivan Rus	100	1 025	31,1	03.07.13			Other coins	Christianization of Kievan Rus'
49	The 25th Anniversary of Ukraine's Independence	250	400	62,2	17.08.16			Rebirth of Ukrainian statehood	Independence of Ukraine
50	The Issuing of a Tomos on the Autocephaly of the Ukrainian Orthodox Church	100	1500	31,1	25.03.19			Spiritual Treasures of Ukraine	Tomos (Eastern Orthodox Church)
51	One Hryvnia	1	500	15.55	17.05.21			Other coins	Hryvnia
52	The 30th Anniversary of Ukraine's Independence	250	400	62,2	17.08.21			Rebirth of Ukrainian statehood	Independence of Ukraine

== Series of coins ==
- 2000 Years of Christmas
- Ancient monuments of Ukraine
- Airplanes of Ukraine
- Ancient cities of Ukraine
- Architectural monuments of Ukraine
- Ukraine's Armed Forces
- On the edge of Millenniums
- Children's Zodiac
- Eastern calendar
- Fauna in cultural monuments of Ukraine
- Famous families of Ukraine
- Flora and fauna
- Folk crafts of Ukraine
- Folk Musical Instruments
- Heroes of Cossack Age
- Hero-cities of Ukraine
- Hetmans' capital cities
- Higher educational establishments of Ukraine
- Maritime history of Ukraine
- Monuments of ancient cultures of Ukraine
- My Immortal Ukraine
- Oblasts of Ukraine
- Outstanding Personalities of Ukraine
- Other coins
- Points of interest of ancient cultures of Ukraine
- Princes of Ukraine
- Rebirth of Christian spirituality in Ukraine
- Rebirth of Ukrainian statehood
- Ritual Festivals of Ukraine
- Spiritual Treasures of Ukraine
- Sports
- The Smallest Golden Coin
- To the heroes of the Maidan
- Cosmic Ukraine
- Ukrainian heritage
- Ukrainian state
- World War II
- Signs of the zodiac

== See also ==
- List of commemorative coins of Ukraine
