= 2000 World Monuments Watch =

Nonprofi advocacy program

The World Monuments Watch is a flagship advocacy program of the New York–based private non-profit organization World Monuments Fund (WMF) and American Express to call upon every government in the world, preservation organizations, and other groups and individuals to nominate sites and monuments that are particularly endangered. At the same time, the nominators commit themselves to participate in a carefully planned preservation project.

== Selection process ==
Every two years, the program publishes a select list known as the Watch List of 100 Most Endangered Sites that is in urgent need of preservation funding and protection. The sites are chosen from these nominations by an independent panel of international experts, based on the significance of the site, the urgency of the problem, and the viability of the proposal for action. WMF would then publicize their plight and help find the resources and expertise to carry out the preservation projects for the 100 sites on the Watch List. The leverage from the listing also spurs government agencies and local donors to allocate funds and take an active role in protecting the cultural landmark, in addition to grants directly coming from WMF and American Express.

== 2000 Watch List ==
The 2000 World Monuments Watch List of 100 Most Endangered Sites was launched on 14 September 1999 by WMF President Bonnie Burnham.

[World Monuments] Watch is a bold challenge to local and national authorities to step up to their responsibilities—and an appeal to the public to take immediate action—to save these irreplaceable sites that define the history and the humanity of the peoples of the world[…] Once these sites are lost, they are gone forever. They are the very definition of the word irreplaceable.

— Bonnie Burnham, WMF president, launch of 2000 Watch List

=== List by country/territory ===
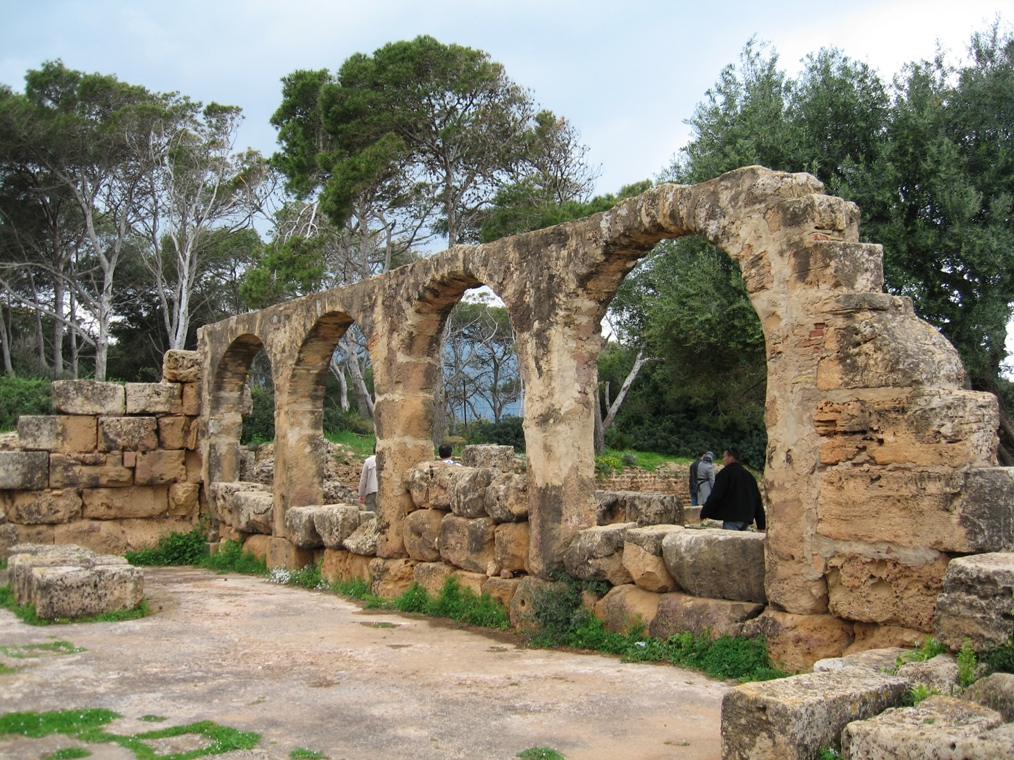
Tipasa in Algeria was an ancient Punic trading post conquered by Rome and turned into a strategic base for the conquest of the kingdoms of Mauritania.

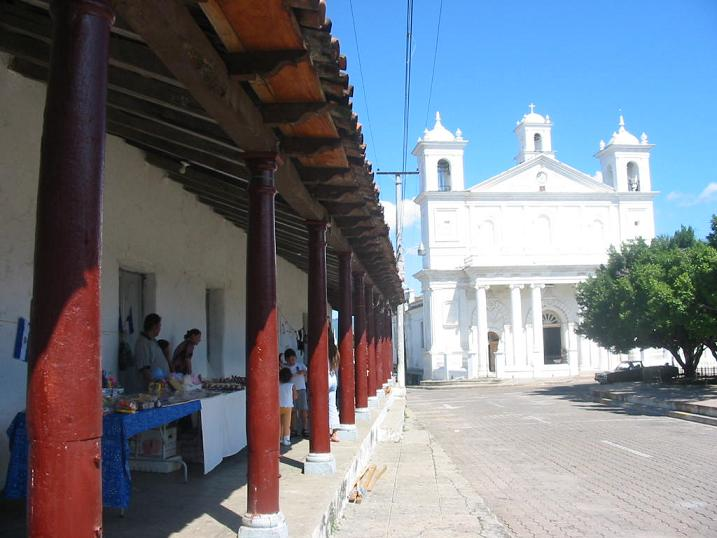
Suchitoto is widely known throughout El Salvador for its church and for its cobblestone roads.

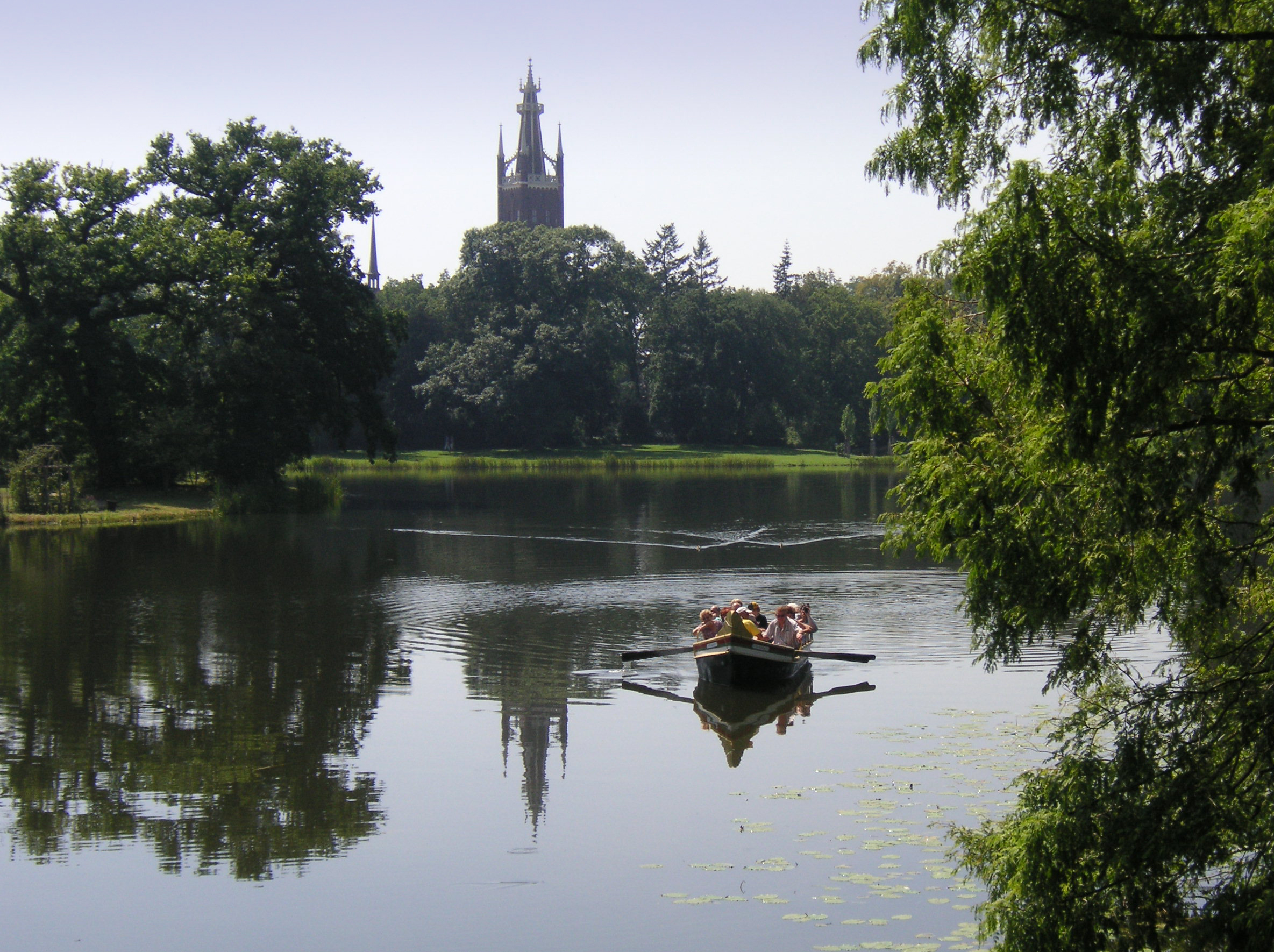
Gartenreich Dessau-Worlitz, the Dessau-Wörlitz Garden Realm, is one of the first and largest English parks in Germany and continental Europe.

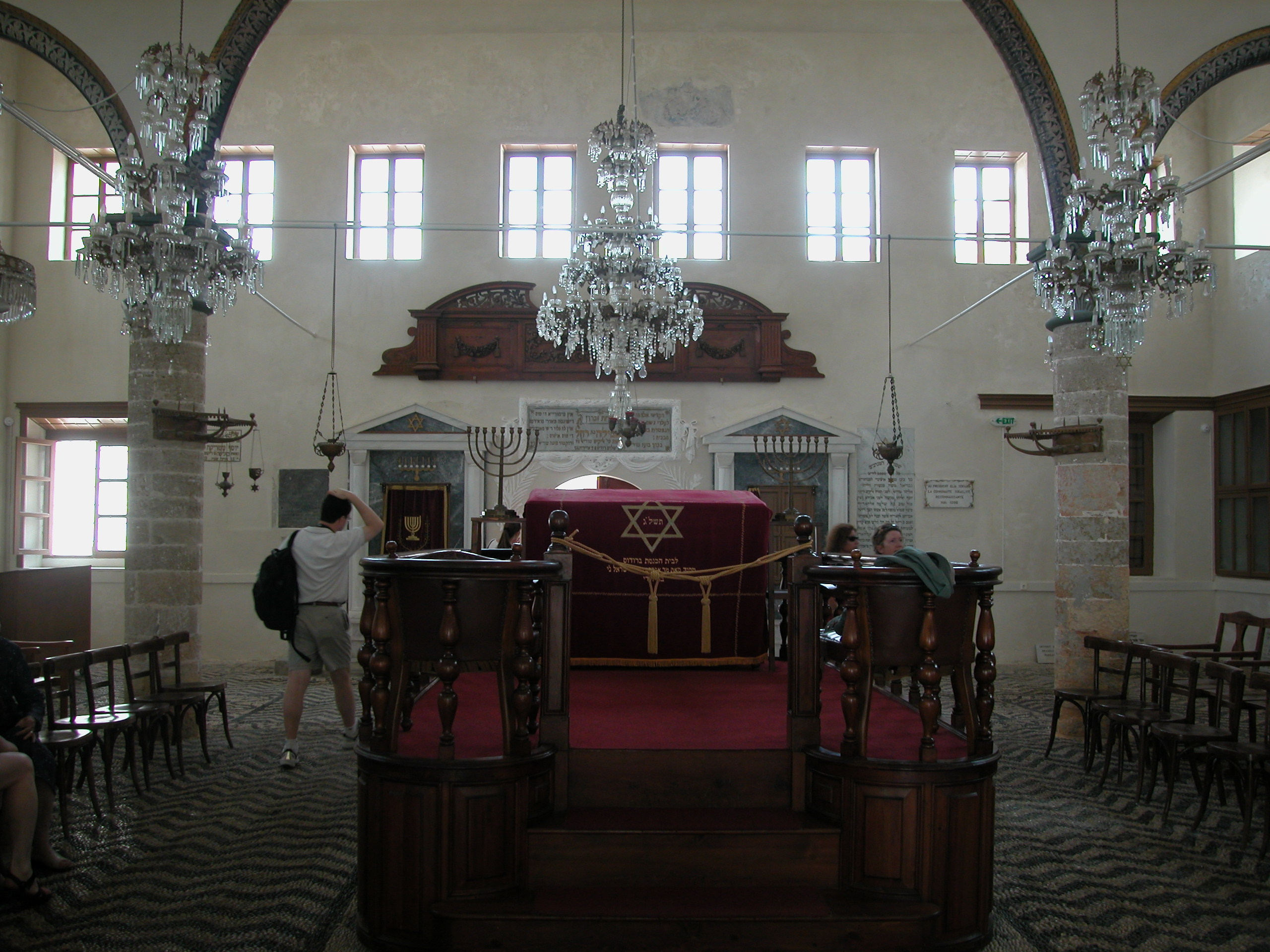
The Kahal Shalom Synagogue is the oldest synagogue in Greece today.

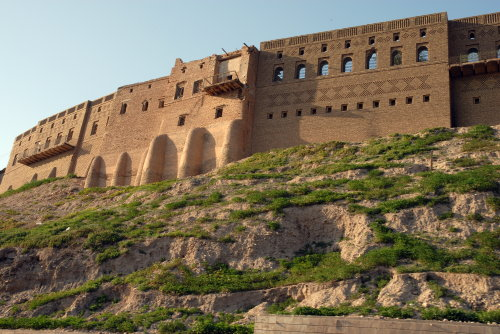
Citadel of Arbil.

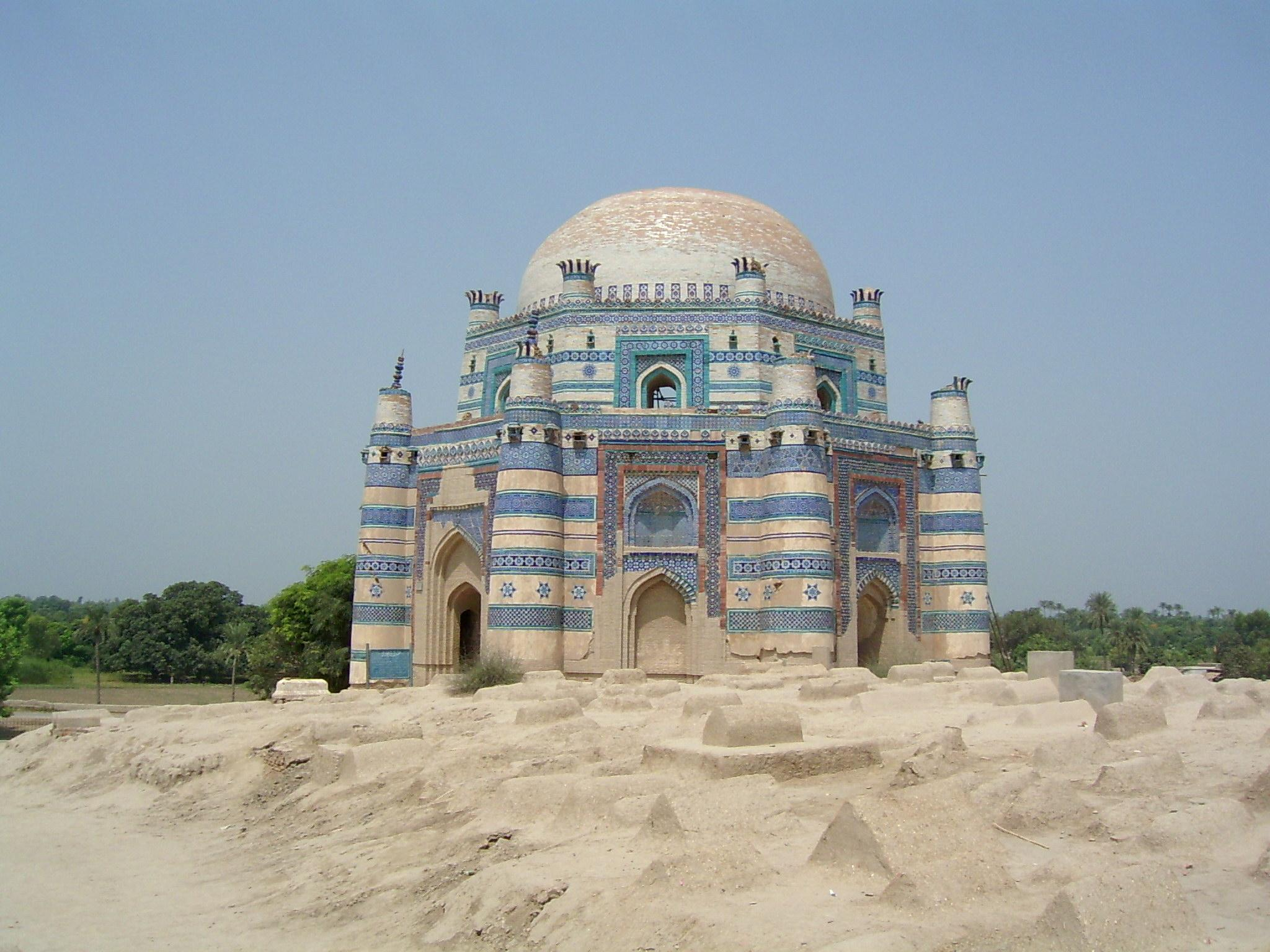
Uch in Pakistan is thought to be one of the Alexandrias founded by Alexander the Great.

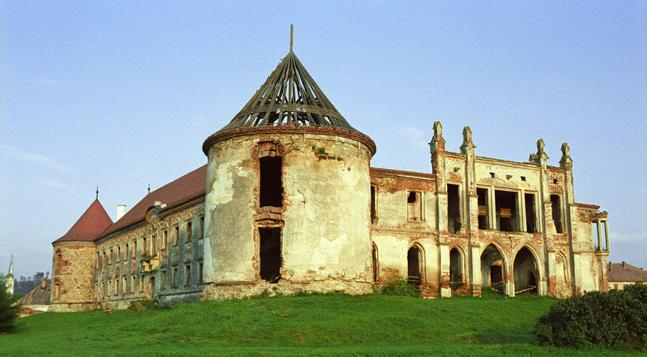
Began in the 16th century, the Banffy Castle is considered to be Romania's most important Renaissance-style castle.

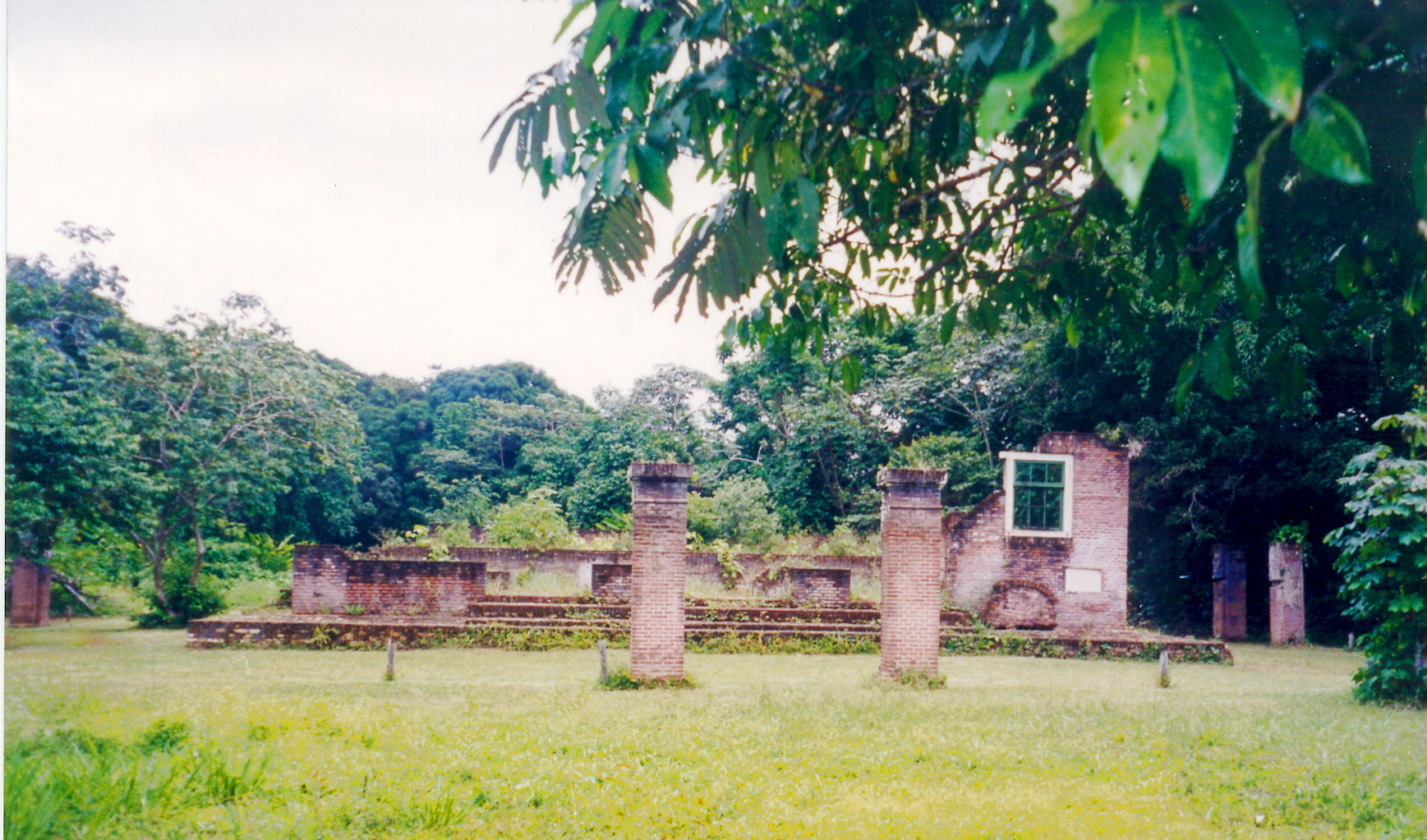
The settlement of Jodensavanne in Suriname was once the largest and only autonomous Jewish agrarian community in the New World.

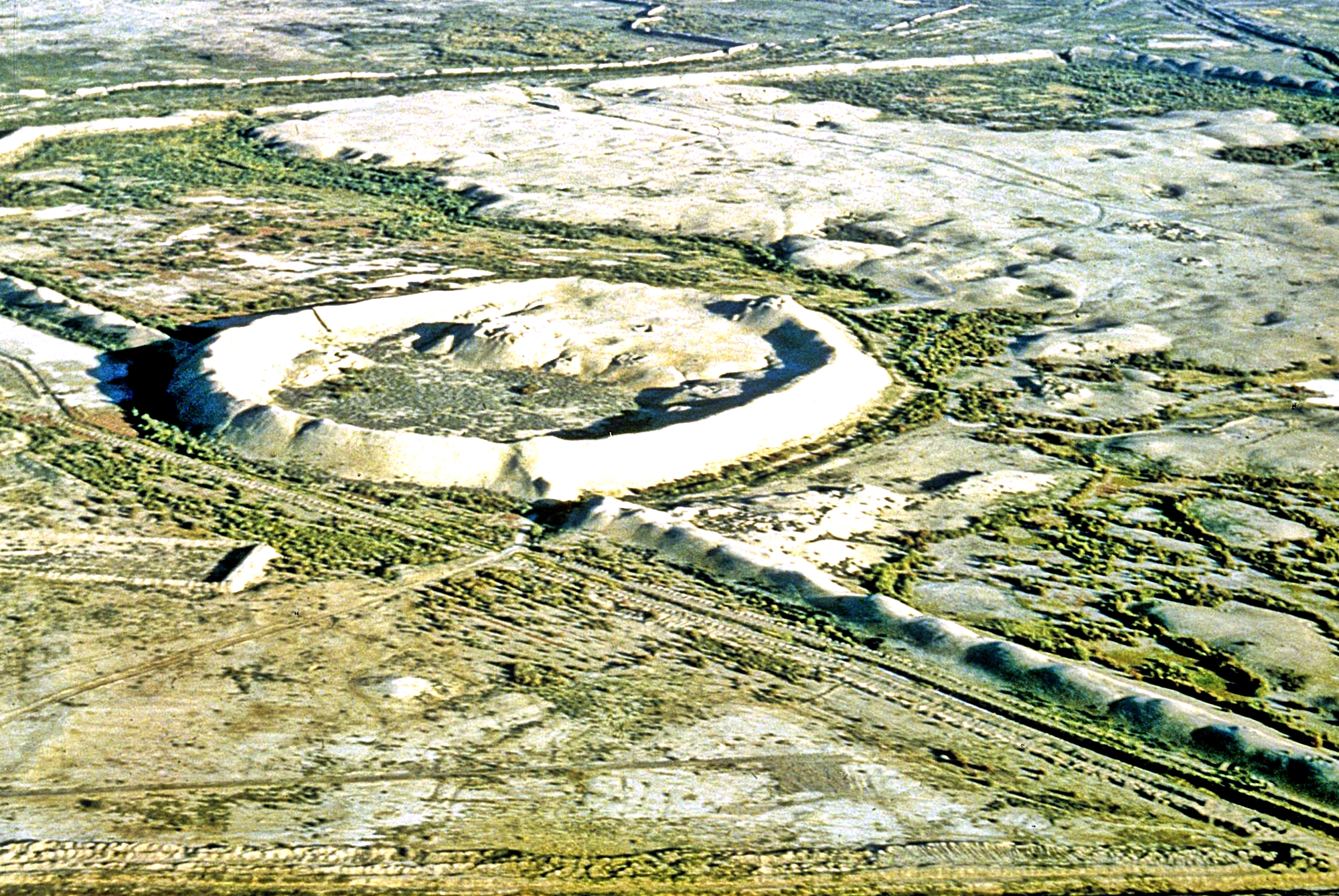
Merv in Turkmenistan was a major oasis-city in Central Asia, on the historical Silk Road. It is claimed that Merv was briefly the largest city in the world in the 12th century.

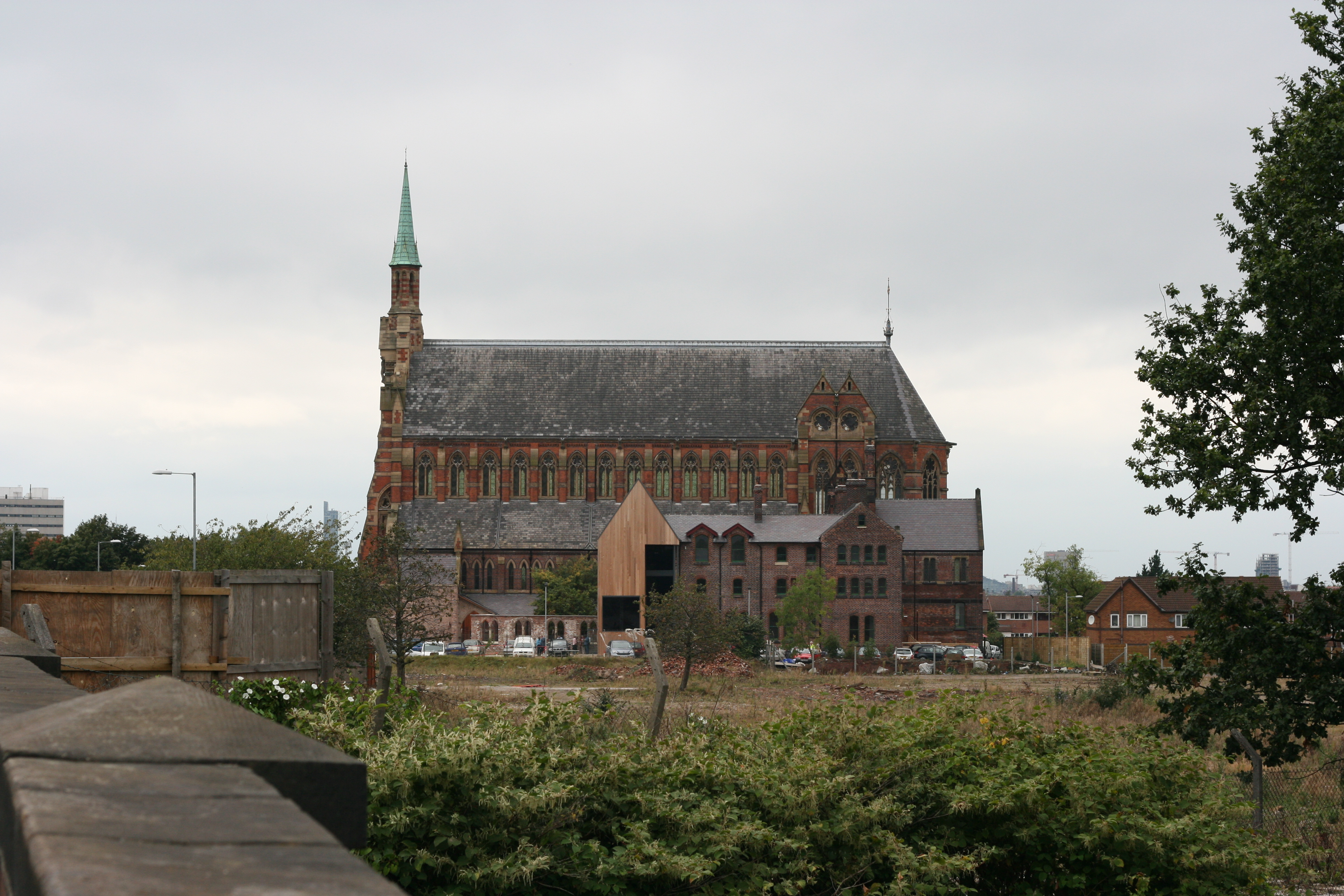
Saint Francis Church and Monastery in Manchester, England is believed to be one of the finest examples of High Victorian Gothic architecture in the world.

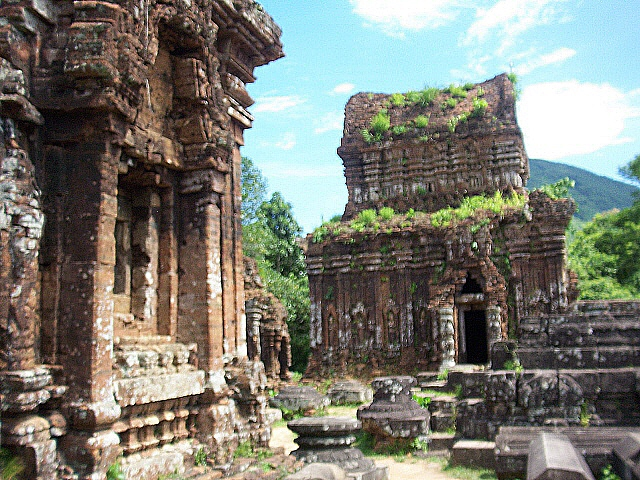
The Vietnamese site of My Son was the religious and political capital of the Champa Kingdom for most of its existence.

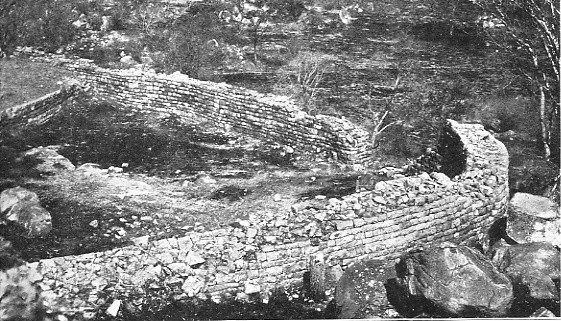
The discovery of objects from Europe and China shows that Zimbabwe's Khami was a major centre for trade over a long period of time.

Number^{[A]}	Country/Territory	Site^{[B]}	Location^{[C]}	Period^{[C]}
1	Albania	Butrint Archaeological Site	Sarande	8th century BC–18th century AD
2	Algeria	Tipasa Archaeological Park	Tipasa	40 BC
3	Belgium	Tour and Taxis (transport hub)	Brussels	1897–1907
4	Bosnia and Herzegovina	Mostar Historic Center	Mostar	16th century
5	Brazil	Santo Antonio do Paraguacu, Sao Francisco do Paraguacu	Bahia	1650–1700
6	Brazil	Vila de Paranapiacaba	Santo Andre	1868
7	Bulgaria	Ivanovo Rock Chapels	Rousse Region	13th–14th century
8	Cambodia	Banteay Chhmar Temple of Jayavarman VII	Thmar Puok	12th century
9	Chile	Orongo Ceremonial Site	Easter Island	15th–18th century
10	China	Dulan County Tibetan Royal Tomb Group	Reshuixiang-Xuewei, Dulan	7th–9th century
11	China	Palpung Monastery	Babang Village, Sichuan	1725
12	China	Temple of Agriculture (Xiannongtan)	Beijing	15th century
13	China	Xuanjian Tower	Yuci City, Shanxi	1515
14	Croatia	Vukovar City Center	Vukovar	Mid–18th century
15	Cuba	National Art Schools	Cubanacan, Havana	1961–1965
16	Cuba	San Isidro de los Destiladeros	Valle de los Ingenios, Trinidad	1828
17	Cuba	Santa Teresa de Jesus Cloisters	Havana	18th century
18	Czech Republic	Kuks Forest Sculptures	Kuks	1695–1732
19	Dominican Republic	Puerto Plata Lighthouse	Puerto Plata	1879
20	El Salvador	Suchitoto City	Cuscatlan	16th century
21	Egypt	Khasekhemwy at Hierakonpolis	Edfu, Kom el Ahmar	28th century BC
22	Egypt	Sultan Qa'itbay Complex	Cairo	1477
23	Egypt	Valley of the Kings	Thebes, Luxor	16th–11th century BC
24	Ethiopia	Mentewab-Qwesqwam Palace	Gondar	18th century
25	France	Saint Pierre Cathedral	Beauvais	1225–1272
26	Georgia	Ikorta Church of the Archangel	Zemo Artsevi Village	1172
27	Georgia	Tbilisi Historic District	Tbilisi	6th century-Present
28	Germany	Gartenreich Dessau-Worlitz	Dessau	1784–1810
29	Germany	Thomaskirche	Leipzig	1212–1889
30	Greece	Kahal Shalom Synagogue	Rhodes	1577
31	India	Basgo Gompa (Maitreya Temples)	Ladakh, Leh	1530–1699
32	India	Champaner Archaeological Site	Panchmahal, Gujarat	15th–16th century
33	India	Jaisalmer Fort	Rajasthan	12th century
34	India	Metropolitan Building	Calcutta	1908
35	India	Saint Anne Church	Talaulim, Goa	1681–1689
36	Indonesia	Omo Hada (Royal Palace Complex)	Nias, Teluk Dalam, North Sumatra	1715
37	Indonesia	Tanah Lot Temple	Tabanan, Bali	15th century
38	Iraq	Citadel of Arbil	Kurdistan Region	6th millennium BC
39	Ireland	Saint Brendan's Cathedral	Clonfert, County Galway	1165
40	Israel	Tel-Dan Canaanite Gate	Near Kibbutz Dan, Upper Galilee	18th century BC
41	Israel	Ramle White Mosque Archaeological Site	Ramle	8th century
42	Italy	Ancient Pompeii	Naples	1st century BC–AD 79
43	Italy	Bridge of Chains	Bagni di Lucca	1839–1860
44	Italy	Cinque Terre	Liguria	1200
45	Italy	Santi Quattro Coronati Cloister	Rome	Early 13th century
46	Jamaica	Falmouth Historic Town	Trelawny Parish	1770s
47	Jordan	Petra Archaeological Site	Wadi Mousa	1st–6th century
48	Kenya	Thimlich Ohinga Cultural Landscape	Migori	14th century
49	Lebanon	Enfeh Archaeological Site	Enfeh, near Tripoli	2nd millennium BC–13th century AD
50	Malaysia	George Town Historic Enclave	Penang State	1786–mid–20th century
51	Malaysia	Kampung Cina River Frontage	Kuala Terengganu	Late 19th–early 20th century
52	Malta	Mnajdra Prehistoric Temples	Mnajdra	3600 BC–2500 BC
53	Mexico	Madera Cave Dwellings	Madera, Chihuahua	10th–14th century
54	Mexico	San Juan de Ulua Fort	Veracruz	1535–1786
55	Mexico	Santa Prisca Parish Church	Taxco de Alarcon, Guerrero	1751–1758
56	Mexico	Teotihuacan Archaeological Site	San Juan Teotihuacan	100 BC–AD 750
57	Mexico	Yaxchilan Archaeological Zone	Cuenca del Usumacinta, Chiapas	400–900
58	Mongolia	Bogd Khaan Palace Museum	Ulaanbaatar	1893–1903
59	Nepal	Itum Monastery	Kathmandu	Before 1241
60	Nepal	Teku Thapatali Monument Zone	Kathmandu	18th–19th century
61	Niger	Giraffe Rock Art Site	Agadez	6th millennium BC
62	Pakistan	Uch Monument Complex	Uch, Bahawalpur District, Punjab Province	ca. 2nd millennium BC–16th century AD
63	Panama	San Lorenzo Castle and San Geronimo Fort	Colon and Portobelo	1595–1770 and 1653–1760
64	Peru	Cusco Historic Center	Cusco	13th–17th century
65	Peru	Los Pinchudos Archaeological Site	Rio Abiseo National Park	16th century
66	Peru	Machu Picchu	Urubamba, Cusco	15th century
67	Philippines	Rice Terraces of the Cordilleras	Ifugao	1st century–Present
68	Poland	Vistulamouth Fortress	Gdańsk	1482–1800
69	Romania	Bánffy Castle	Bonţida	16th–18th century
70	Russia	Arkhangelskoye State Museum	Moscow	1751–1831
71	Russia	Irkoutsk Historic Center	Irkoutsk	1770–1799
72	Russia	Oranienbaum State Museum	Lomonosov	1711–1774
73	Russia	Paanajarvi Village	Kemi Province	14th century–Present
74	Russia	Rostov Veliky Historic Center	Rostov Veliky	9th century–early 20th century
75	Russia	Russakov Club	Moscow	1929
76	Russia	Viipuri Library	Vyborg	1935
77	Slovakia	Basil the Great Church	Krajne Cierno	1750
78	Sudan	Gebel Barkal Archaeological Site	Karima	1460 BC–AD 100
79	Suriname	Jodensavanne Archaeological Site	Redi Doti	1660–1830
80	Turkey	Ani Archaeological Site	Ocarli Koyu, Kars	3rd–14th century
81	Turkey	Çatalhöyük	Cumra, Konya	10th millennium BC
82	Turkey	Mount Nemrut Archaeological Site	Kahta	80 BC–72 BC
83	Turkey	Zeyrek Mosque	Istanbul	1118–1136
84	Turkmenistan	Merv Archaeological Site	Bairam Ali	6th century BC–15th century AD
85	Ukraine	Kamyanets Podilsky Castle Bridge	Kamyanets Podilsky	ca. 2nd century–1942
86	Ukraine	Zhovkva Synagogue	Zhovkva	1692
87	United Kingdom	Abbey Farmstead	Faversham, Kent, England	13th century–Present
88	United Kingdom	Saint Francis Church and Monastery	East Manchester, England	1863–1872
89	United States of America	Eastern State Penitentiary	Philadelphia, Pennsylvania	1822–1836
90	United States of America	Lancaster County	Lancaster County, Pennsylvania	1710 – present
91	United States of America	Seventh Regiment Armory	New York City	1877–1881
92	United States of America	Tree Studios and Medinah Temple	Chicago, Illinois	1894–1913
93	United States of America	VDL Research House II	Los Angeles	1932; rebuilt 1966
94	Uzbekistan	Abdulazizkhan Complex	Bukhara	1417
95	Venezuela	San Francisco Church	Coro, Falcon	1720–1887
96	Vietnam	Minh Mang Tomb	Hue	1840
97	Vietnam	My Son Temple Complex	Duy Xuyen, Quang Nam	4th–13th century
98	Yemen	Tarim Historic City	Wadi Hadramaut	1870–1920
99	Yugoslavia	Subotica Synagogue	Subotica	1902
100	Zimbabwe	Khami National Monument	Bulawayo	Mid–15th century–Mid–17th century

== Statistics by country/territory ==
The following countries/territories have multiple sites entered on the 2000 Watch List, listed by the number of sites:

Number of sites	Country/Territory
7	Russia
5	India, Mexico and United States of America
4	China, Italy and Turkey
3	Cuba, Egypt and Peru
2	Brazil, Georgia, Germany, Indonesia, Israel, Malaysia, Nepal, Ukraine, United Kingdom and Vietnam

== Notes ==
A. Numbers list only meant as a guide on this article. No official reference numbers have been designated for the sites on the Watch List.
B. Names and spellings used for the sites were based on the official 2000 Watch List as published.
C. The references to the sites' locations and periods of construction were based on the official .
