= Allard Pierson Museum =

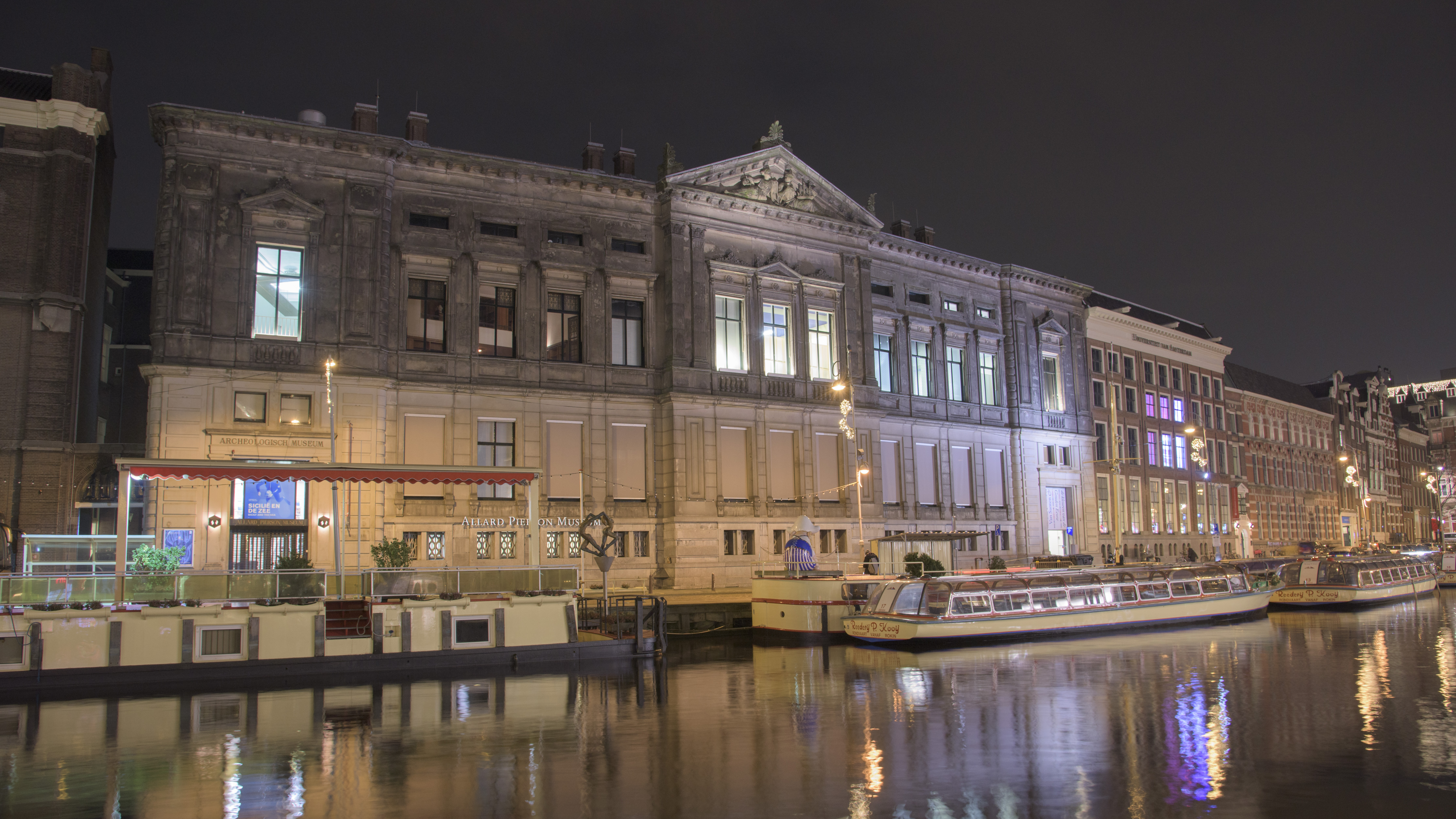
- Museum in 2015

- Location in the city center of Amsterdam
- Established: 12 November 1934
- Location: Oude Turfmarkt 127; Amsterdam, Netherlands
- Coordinates: 52°22′8.2″N 4°53′34.6″E
- Type: Archaeological museum
- Accreditation: ICOM, Official Museums of Amsterdam
- Visitors: 60,430 (2012)
- Director: Wim Hupperetz
- Owner: University of Amsterdam
- Website: www.allardpierson.nl

The Allard Pierson Museum is the archaeological museum of the University of Amsterdam. It is situated at the Oude Turfmarkt 127 in Amsterdam, the Netherlands. Artifacts from the ancient civilizations of ancient Egypt, the Near East, the Greek World, Etruria, and the Roman Empire are curated and exhibited in this museum.

== Allard Pierson ==
The name of the Allard Pierson Museum derives from the first professor of classical archaeology at the University of Amsterdam, Allard Pierson (1831–1896). This former clergyman was invited in 1877 to occupy the chair of Aesthetics, Art History, and Modern Languages at the newly founded university. His passion for antiquity, fuelled by his travels to the Mediterranean area, led to his assembling a collection of plaster casts from 1877 to 1895.

== Founding ==
The second professor of archeology at the University of Amsterdam, Jan Six, had a large personal collection of books and antique objects. At his death in 1926, the university had an interest in acquiring his collection. In 1932, Pierson's son Jan Lodewijk established the Allard Pierson Foundation in order to make the antiquities collection available for research and teaching. The collection was brought to a building on the Weesperzijde in Amsterdam, with the top floor serving as a museum.

The collection grew due to purchases, gifts, and loans of artifacts and documents. On 12 November 1934, the Allard Pierson Museum was officially opened in a building at Sarphatistraat 129-131 (corner of the Roeterstraat). The museum eventually outgrew its building.

== Building ==
A new building became available when the Nederlandse Bank vacated their office at the Oude Turfmarkt in 1976. H.R.H. Princess Beatrix attended the re-opening of the museum on 6 October 1976.

== Collection ==
The museum has collections related to the ancient civilizations of Egypt, the Near East, the Greek World, Etruria, and the Roman Empire. The collections include art objects and utensils dating from 4000 BC to 500 AD. There are also scale models of ancient temples and buildings. In the Ancient Egypt exhibition there is a room dedicated to death, with mummies, sarcophagi, and a film showing the process of mummification. The plaster-cast attic, the “Gipsengalerij”, to be visited only with a guided tour, shows copies of Roman and Greek statues.

The museum's Greek pottery collection features examples of black-figure and red-figure pottery produced in the fifth and sixth centuries BC. A collection of Roman sarcophagi is also on display, including a rare wooden coffin from around 150 AD that is carved partly in the shape of the man within it.

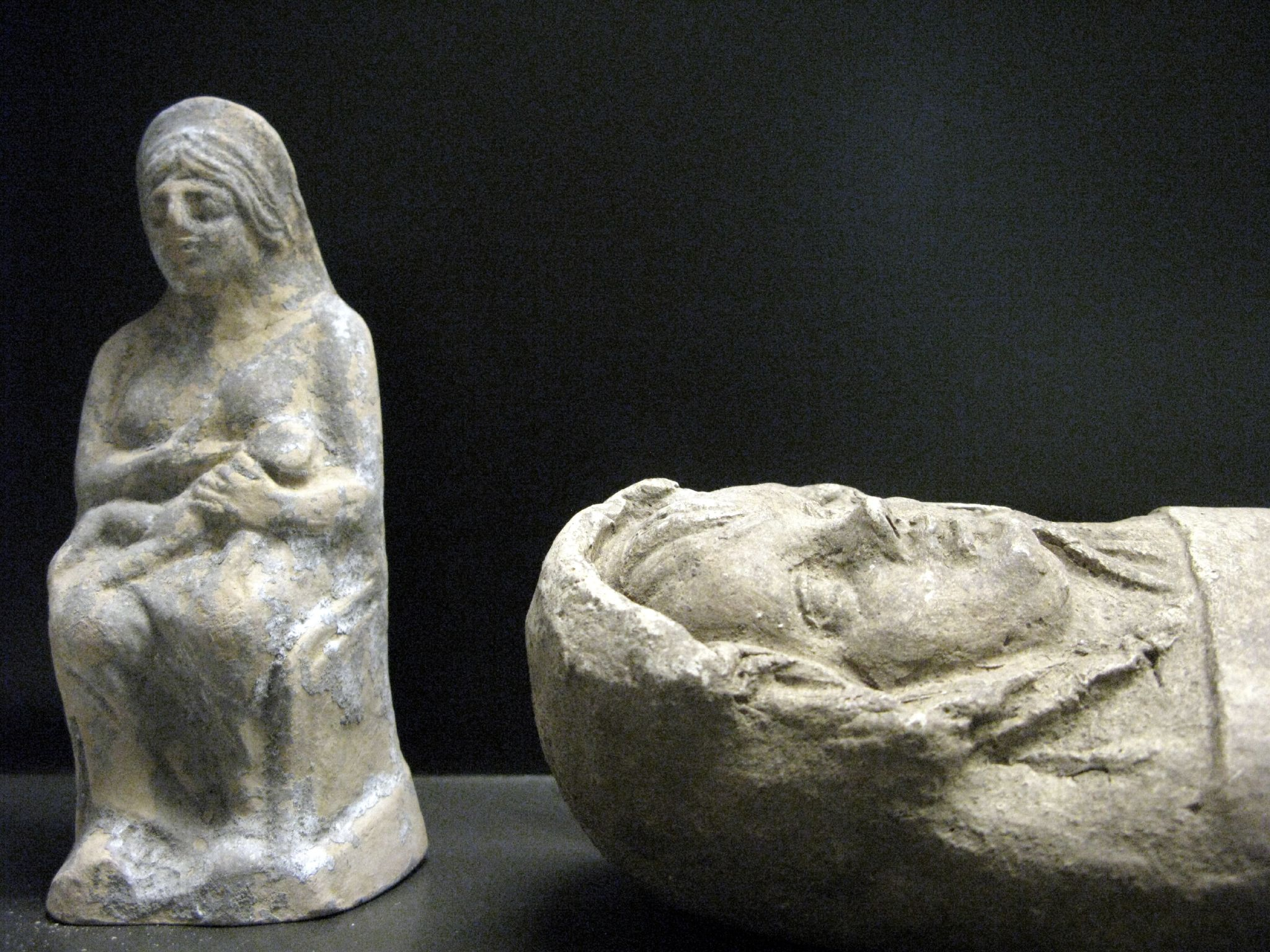
Etrurian statuette of a tightly wrapped baby, possibly consecrated to the gods to avert children's diseases. 3rd–2nd century BC

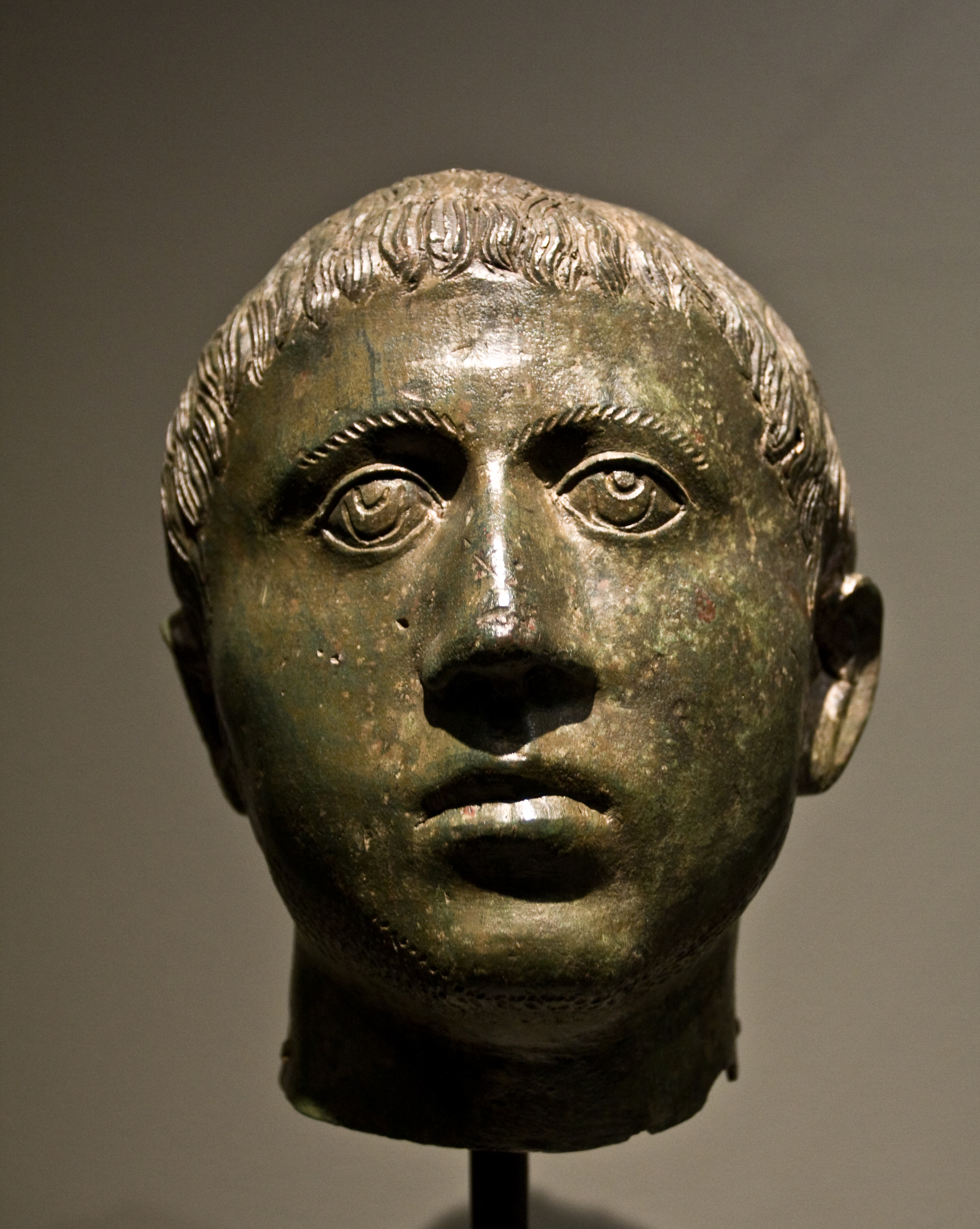
Bronze head of a Roman boy

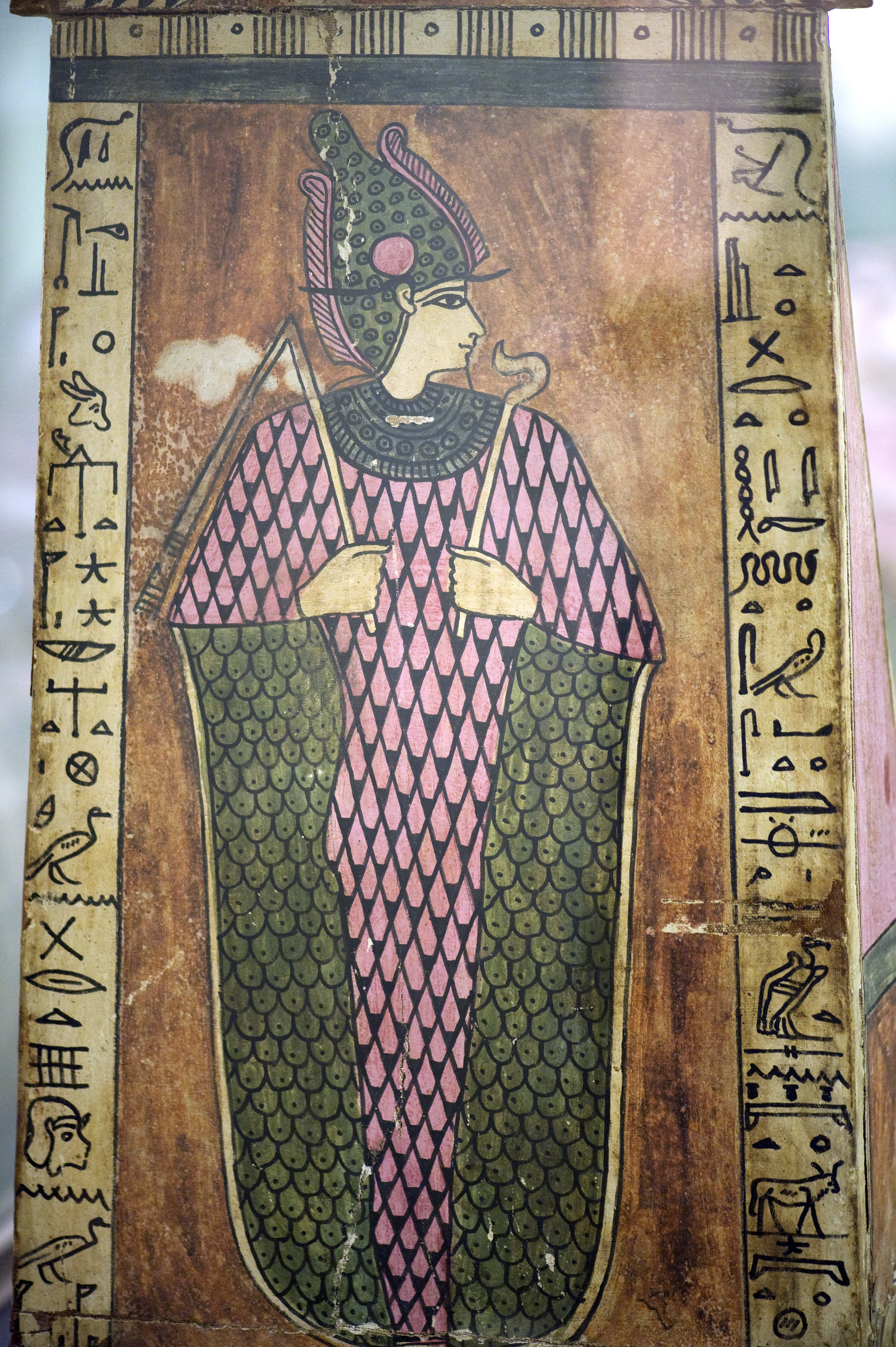
Osiris on a sarcophagus lid, Egypt, 2nd century AD

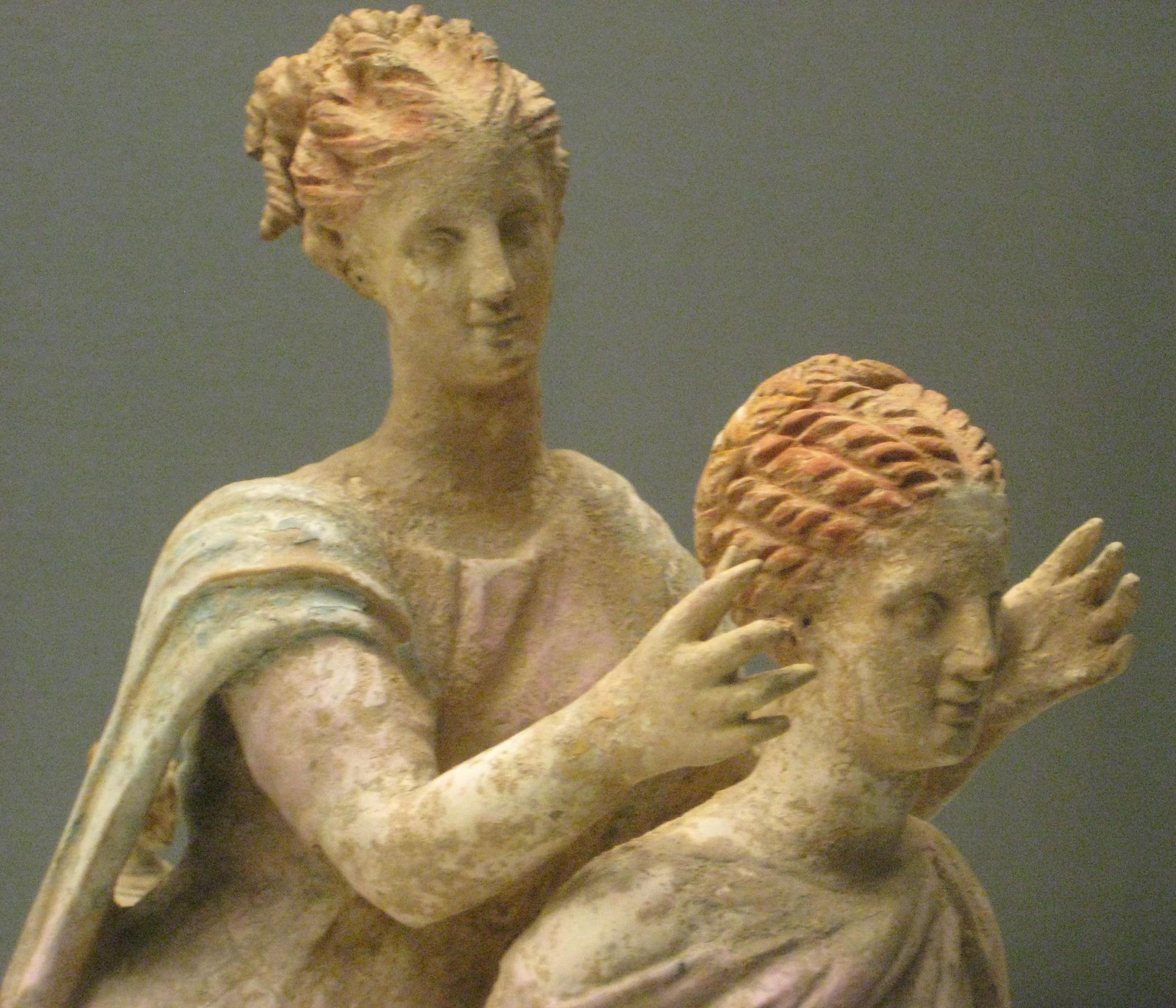
Girls playing. Pottery, Corinth, circa 300 BC

== Crimea exhibit dispute ==
In February 2014, it hosted the international exhibit "Crimea – Gold and Secrets of the Black Sea", which included Scythian art objects from four museums located in Crimea and from an additional one in mainland Ukraine. It was the largest international exhibit of Ukrainian treasures ever organized until then. One month later, the Annexation of Crimea by the Russian Federation created an international dispute on the artifacts' ownership because the Allard Pierson Museum had signed a series of agreements both with the Ukrainian Minister of Culture and with the single five donor institutions which had entered Russian jurisdiction. In September 2014, part of the exhibits of the exhibition that belonged to museums from mainland Ukraine were returned to Ukraine. Pending a resolution, the art works that belonged to museums in Crimea remained in storage in the Netherlands from 2014 until 2023. After several rulings by Dutch courts in favor of Ukrainian claims, Ukrainian Culture Minister Rostyslav Karandieiev signed an agreement with Fred Virmen, acting director of the University Library of the University of Amsterdam to return the artifacts to Ukraine on 22 November 2023. The museum announced that the transfer had been completed on 27 November. The artifacts are returned to the National Museum of the History of Ukraine's branch in the Kyiv Pechersk Lavra. Els van der Plas, director of the Allard Pierson: ‘This was a special case, in which cultural heritage became a victim of geopolitical developments.'

== The Society of Friends ==
The exhibitions and activities of the museum are supported by the Society of Friends of the Allard Pierson Museum, established in 1969. The Society has around 1500 members at present.
