= Krajné Čierno =

Village in Slovakia

- Municipality
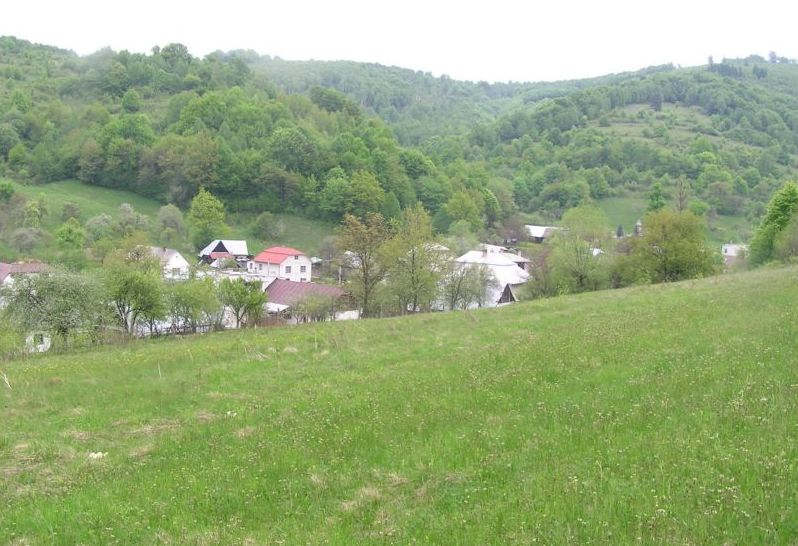

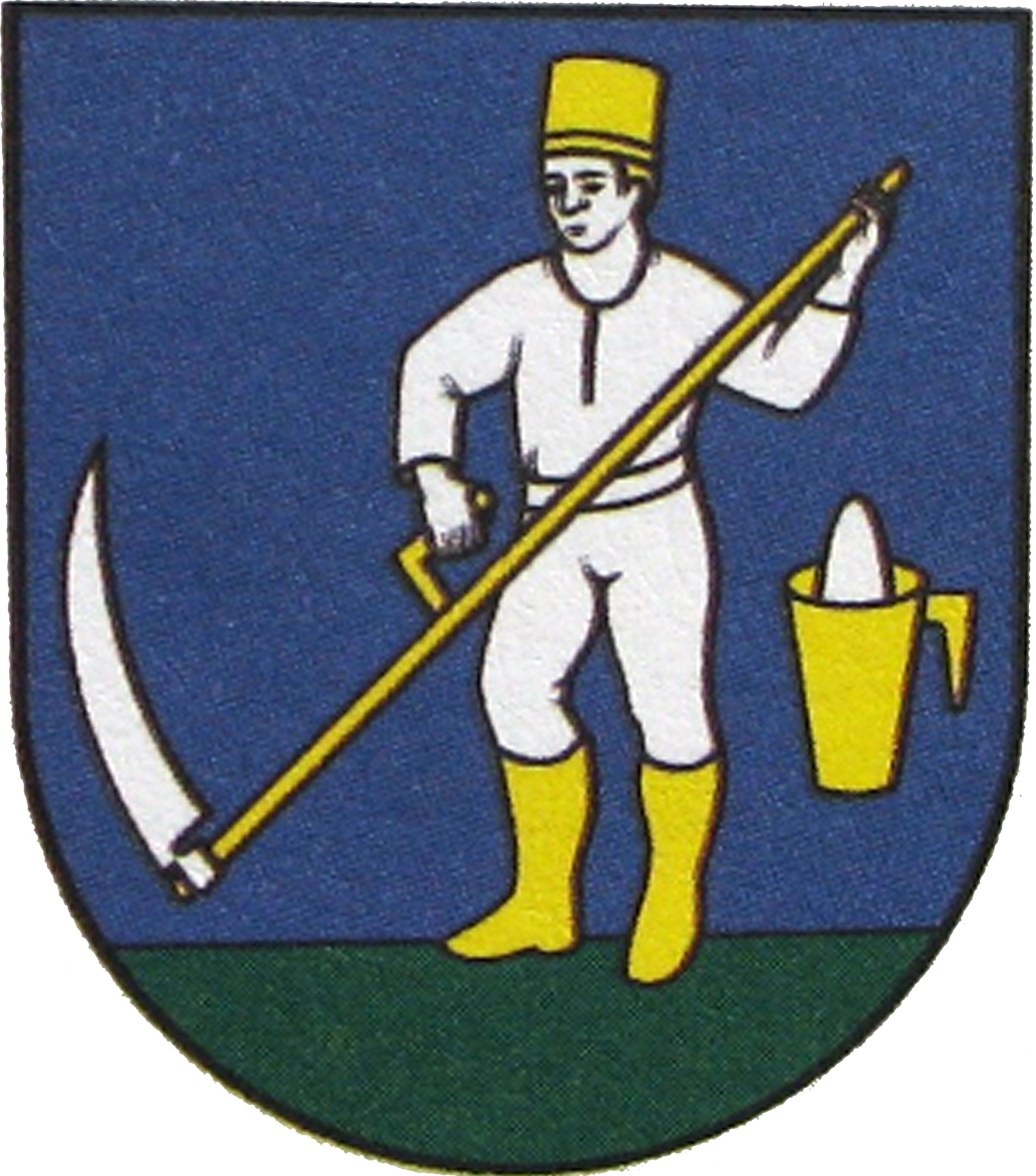
- Flag Coat of arms

- Location of Krajné Čierno in the Prešov Region Location of Krajné Čierno in Slovakia
- Coordinates: 49.35°N 21.67°E
- Country: Slovakia
- Region: Prešov Region
- District: Svidník District
- First mentioned: 1618

Area
  - Total: 6.57 km^{2} (2.54 sq mi)
- Elevation: 318 m (1,043 ft)

Population (2025)
  - Total: 77
- Time zone: UTC+1 (CET)
  - Summer (DST): UTC+2 (CEST)
- Postal code: 900 3
- Area code: +421 54
- Vehicle registration plate (until 2022): SK

Krajné Čierno (Rusyn: Крайнэ Чорне; Hungarian: Végcsarnó, until 1899: Krajnó-Csarnó) is a village and municipality in Svidník District in the Prešov Region of north-eastern Slovakia.

== History ==
In historical records the village was first mentioned in 1618.

== Geography ==
The municipality lies at an altitude of 318 metres (1,043 ft) and covers an area of 6.57 km^{2} (2.54 sq mi) (2025).

== Population ==
Population statistic (10 years)
Year	1995	2005	2015	2025
Count	83	83	75	77
Difference		+0%	−9.63%	+2.66%

Population statistic
Year	2024	2025
Count	78	77
Difference		−1.28%

It has a population of 77 people (31 December 2025).

=== Ethnicity ===
Census 2021 (1+ %)
Ethnicity	Number	Fraction
Slovak	57	72.15%
Rusyn	45	56.96%
Not found out	4	5.06%
Ukrainian	1	1.26%
Albanian	1	1.26%
Total	79	

In year 2021 was 79 people by ethnicity 57 as Slovak, 45 as Rusyn, 4 as Not found out, 1 as Ukrainian and 1 as Albanian.

Note on population: The difference values of population numbers in the table "Population statistic" and in the sections "Ethnicity" & "Religion" is caused by the use of various statistical methods.

=== Religion ===
Census 2021 (1+ %)
Religion	Number	Fraction
Eastern Orthodox Church	46	58.23%
Greek Catholic Church	20	25.32%
None	7	8.86%
Roman Catholic Church	4	5.06%
Not found out	2	2.53%
Total	79	

In year 2021 was 79 people by religion 46 from Eastern Orthodox Church, 20 from Greek Catholic Church, 7 from None, 4 from Roman Catholic Church and 2 from Not found out.

== Genealogical resources ==
The records for genealogical research are available at the state archive "Statny Archiv in Presov, Slovakia"

- Greekcatholic church records (births/marriages/deaths): 1793-1949 (parish B)

== See also ==
- List of municipalities and towns in Slovakia
