= Crimea – Gold and Secrets of the Black Sea =

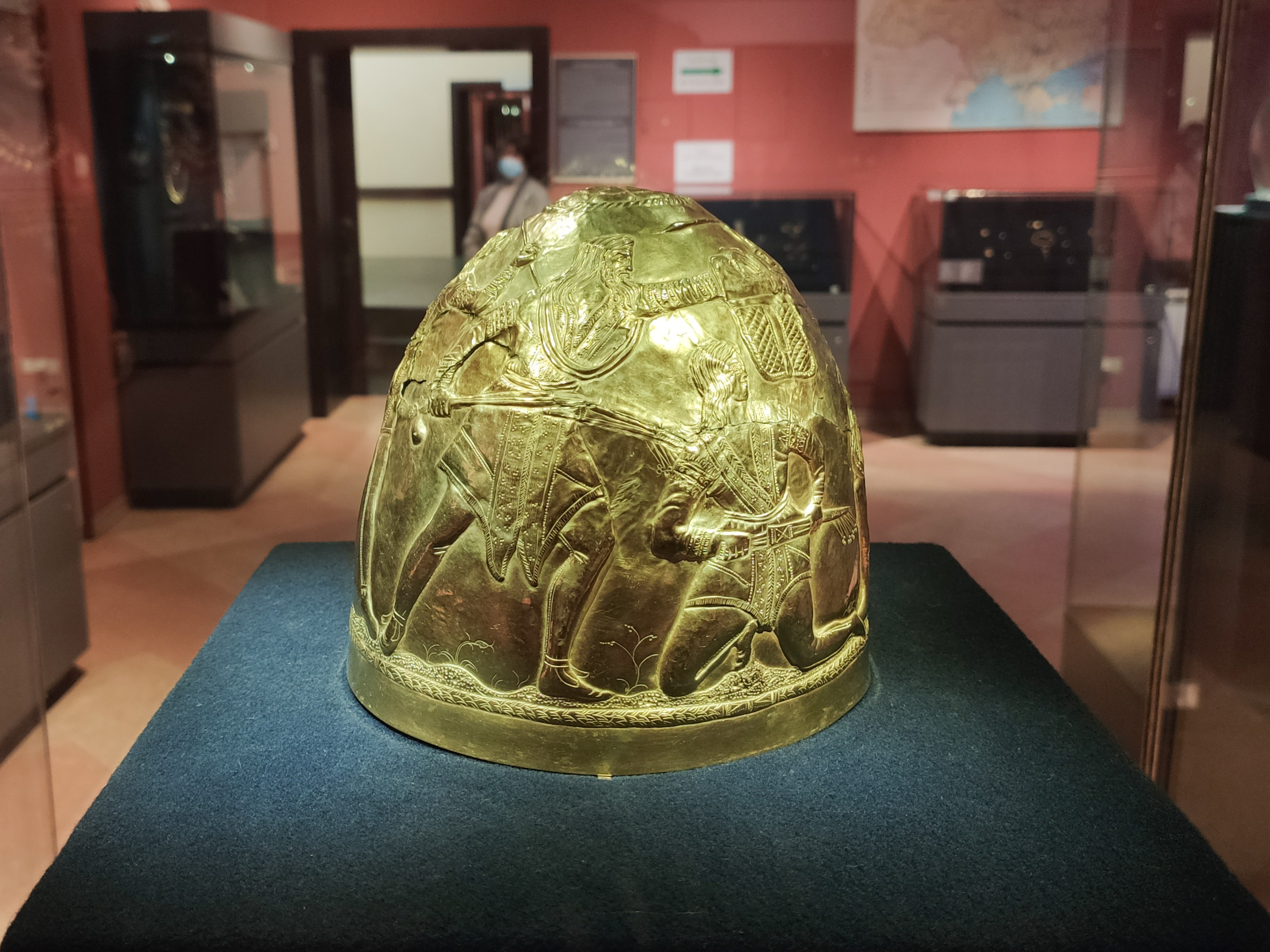
Scythian golden helmet of the 4th Century B.C. One of the exhibits at the "Scythian Gold" exhibition in Amsterdam, and it was returned to Ukraine in 2014.

Crimea – Gold and Secrets of the Black Sea also called "Scythian gold" is an exhibition of historical and cultural value which took place beginning on July 3, 2013, in the Rheinisches Landesmuseum Bonn and later at the Allard Pierson Museum with the support of the University of Amsterdam from February 7 to August 31, 2014. The exhibition was formed from the collections of six Ukrainian museums and historical and cultural reserves. The exhibition covered the chronological framework of antiquity to the early Middle Ages.

After the Russian invasion of Crimea in early 2014 and the occupation of the peninsula, the exhibition became the object of legal disputes between Ukraine, the Allard Pierson Museum, and Crimean museums. In September 2014, part of the exhibits of the exhibition that belonged to museums from mainland Ukraine were returned to Ukraine. On December 14, 2016, the Amsterdam court ruled that the exhibits from Crimea should belong to Ukraine, and not to Crimea occupied by Russia. In this format, this trial was the first in the modern history of Ukraine. Prior to that, the Ukrainian side did not conduct court cases with the occupying state of its territory.

== Collection ==
"Scythian Gold" is presented from six Ukrainian museums and historical and cultural reserves including:

- National Museum of the History of Ukraine
- Odesa Archaeological Museum

Museums of temporarily occupied Crimea:

- Chersonesus Historical and Archaeological Museum-Reserve in Sevastopol
- Kerch Historical-Archeological Museum
- Bakhchysarai State Historical and Cultural Reserve
- Republic of Crimea Regional Museum

The exhibition was the first scientific-expositional and cultural-educational platform, in which outstanding sights of the cultural heritage of Ukraine were united. The exhibition itself highlighted the ancient history of Crimea, which, due to historical and political reasons, for many centuries was a crossroads of diverse ethnic groups and cultures, ancient and nomadic worlds, and The East and The West.

The chronological framework of the exhibition covers the ancient period through the Middle Ages. In particular, it is known that the "Republic of Crimea Regional Museum" presented 451 exhibits of the culture of Scythians, Sarmatians, and Goths, which were discovered during research in the territory of Scythian Neapolis. The museum presents bronze and silver ornaments of Sarmatian horse weapons, stucco vessels-watersheds of the 4th century, etc. The Bakhchysarai State Historical and Cultural Reserve provided 215 exhibits for the exhibition which were found in the Ust-Almin necropolis, the burial ground of Suvlu-Kai. The collection is rich in jewelry, objects of decorative and applied art, household items (spoons, plates, jugs), and weapons. Combined, this collection creates a complex of three historical and ethnic cultures of Crimea: Scythians, Goths, and Sarmatians.

== History ==
From July 3, 2013, to January 20, 2014, "Scythian Gold" was displayed at Rheinisches Landesmuseum Bonn. At that time, more than 53 thousand people visited the exhibition. The organizer of the exhibition was the Rhine Regional Museum in the city of Bonn.

From February 7 to August 31, 2014, the exhibition was held at the Allard Pierson Archaeological Museum with the support of the University of Amsterdam. The exhibition was supposed to return in June 2014. However, due to the annexation of the Autonomous Republic of Crimea by the Russian Federation, the return did not take place in time, because it took place during the Russian intervention in the Autonomous Republic of Crimea, which created a legal incident regarding which side the Crimean part of the exhibits would belong to - Ukraine as the organizing state or Crimean museums, which were simply organizers of exhibits.
