= Great Synagogue (Zhovkva) =

Synagogue in Zhovkva, Ukraine

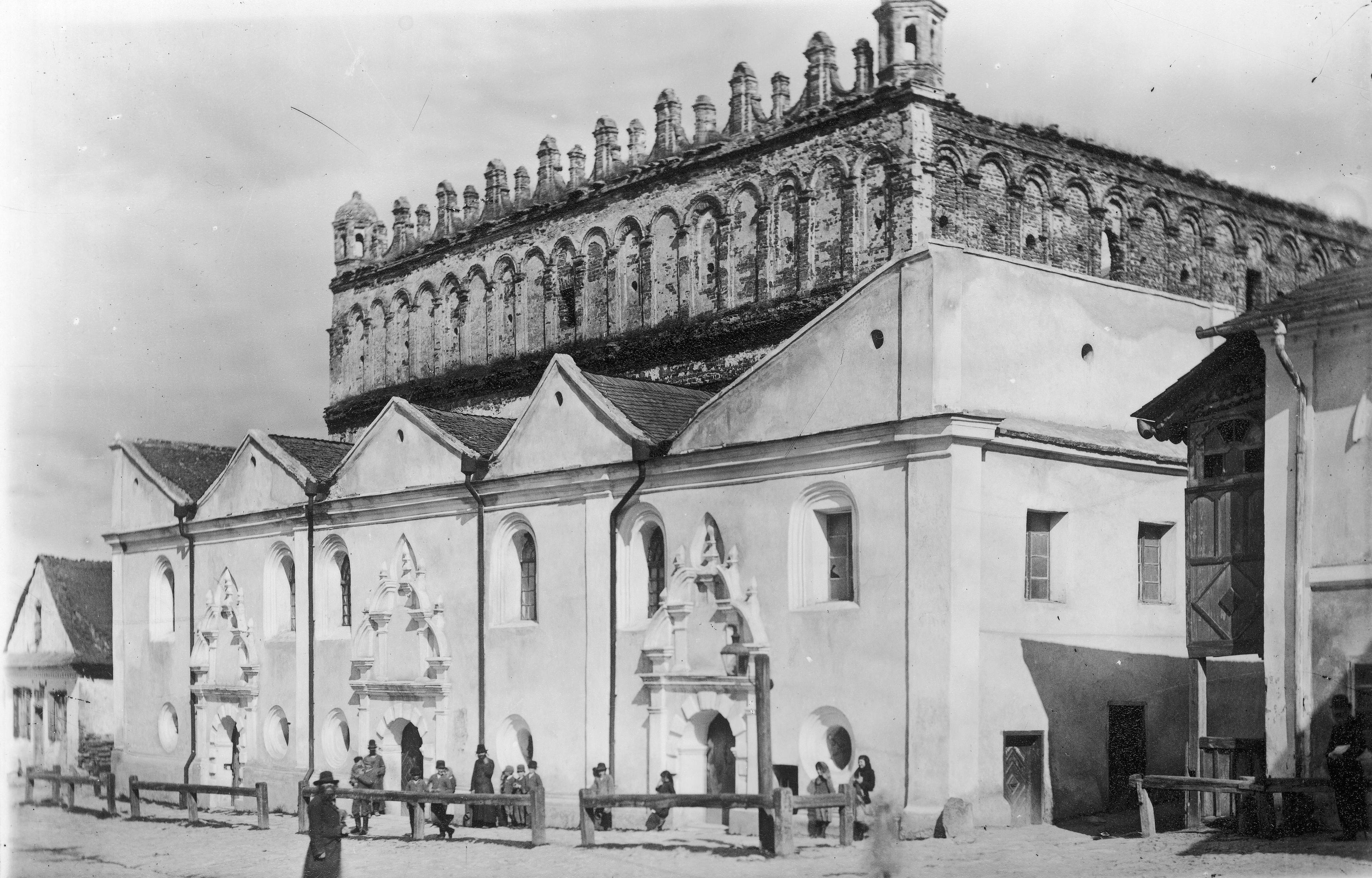
- Great Synagogue and Beit Midrash in Zhovkva, between 1900 and 1925

- Location of the synagogue in Ukraine

Religion
- Affiliation: Judaism
- Rite: Nusach Ashkenaz
- Ecclesiastical or organizational status: Synagogue
- Status: Under restoration

Location
- Location: Vulytsya Zaporizʹka, Zhovkva, Lviv Raion, Lviv Oblast 80300
- Country: Ukraine
- Interactive map of Great Synagogue
- Coordinates: 50°5′N 23°56′E

Architecture
- Architects: Piotr Beber (Ukrainian: Петер Бебер)
- Type: Synagogue architecture
- Style: Fortress synagogue; Renaissance; Baroque
- Funded by: John III Sobieski
- General contractor: Petro Beber
- Established: 1624 (as a congregation)
- Completed: 1692
- Destroyed: 1941
- Materials: Stone

The Great Synagogue is a Jewish synagogue, located on Vulytsya Zaporizʹka, in Zhovkva (Zółkiew), in the Lviv Raion of Lviv Oblast, of Ukraine. It was built between 1692 and 1698 with a financial loan from King John III Sobieski, and was hence also known as the Sobieski Shul.

== Overview ==
As a fortress synagogue, the building's walls were 2 metres (6 ft 7 in) thick and it had a heavy door.

The building's roof and most of its interior were destroyed during the Holocaust. It was afterwards used as a warehouse. Partial rebuilding was carried out in 1955–1956 and 1992, but the synagogue has continued to deteriorate nonetheless. It was included in the 2000 World Monuments Watch; and an approved restoration plan commenced from 2001.

== See also ==
- History of the Jews in Ukraine
- List of synagogues in Ukraine
