= Panachranta (icon) =

Type of Eastern Orthodox Church icon

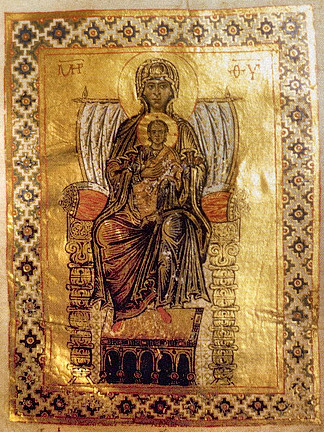
Panachranta Theotokos, mid-11th-century Kievan illumination from the Gertrude Psalter

Panachranta (from Greek πανάχραντος 'all-immaculate') is a type of icon in the Eastern Orthodox Church, that refers to the all immaculate Virgin Mary, the Theotokos.

== Description ==
Panachranta type icons depict the royally enthroned Mother of God holding her Son on her lap.

== Examples ==
The Icon of the Enthroned Virgin and Child with saints and angels dates from the 6th century and is found at Saint Catherine's Monastery at the foot of Mount Sinai.

The 11th century Theotokos Panachranta is from Svensky Monastery. With the Theotokos are SS Anthony and Theodosius of Kiev. It is popularly attributed to the most celebrated icon-painter of Kievan Rus, St. Alypius from the Kiev Pechersk Monastery and is possibly modeled on a mosaic from the central conch of the Assumption Cathedral in the Pechersk Monastery.

The Mother of God Enthroned belongs to the Panachranta type. Shortly before Napoleon's invasion in 1812, it was moved for safekeeping from the Ascension Convent in Moscow to the Church of the Ascension in the village of Kolomskoye, where it remained until rediscovered in 1917.

== Gallery ==
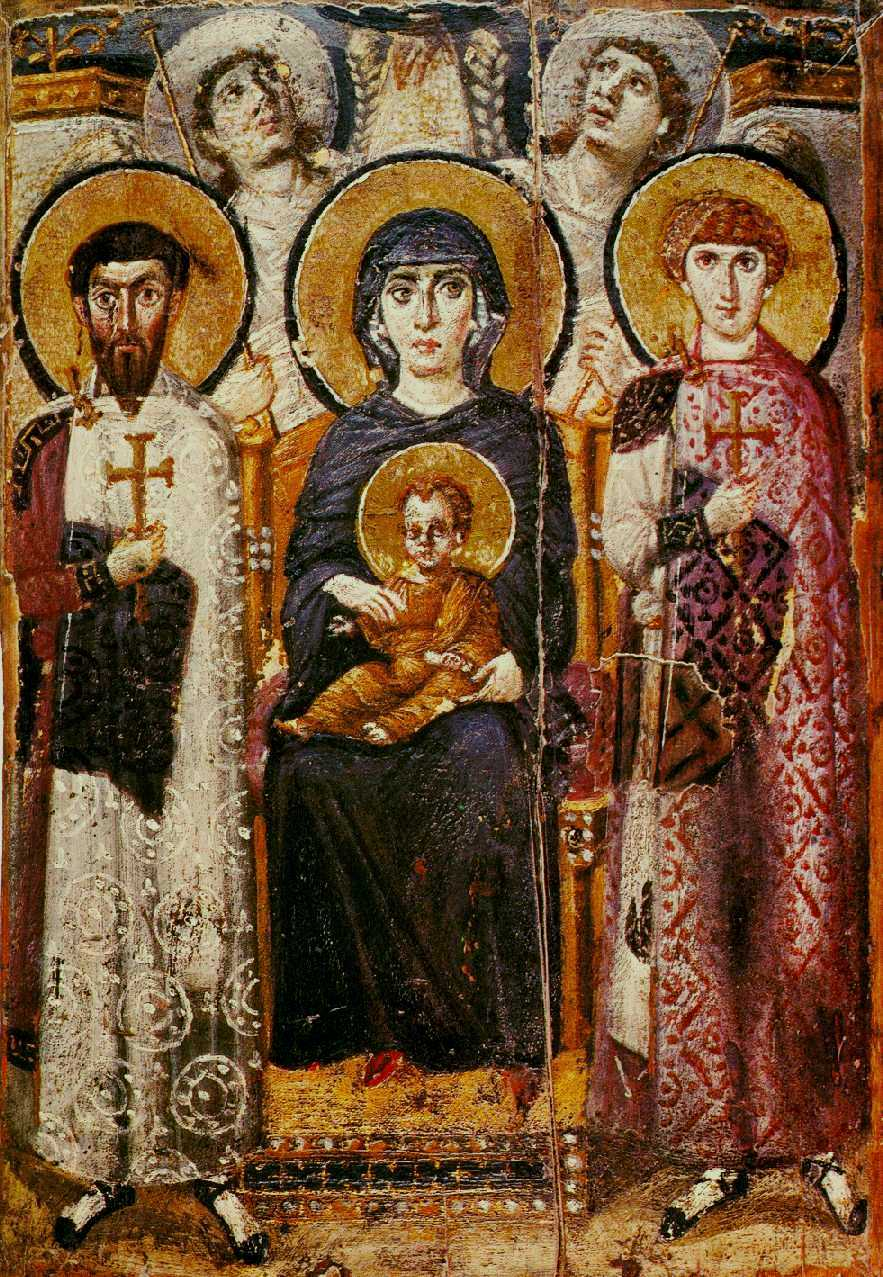
Enthroned Virgin and Child

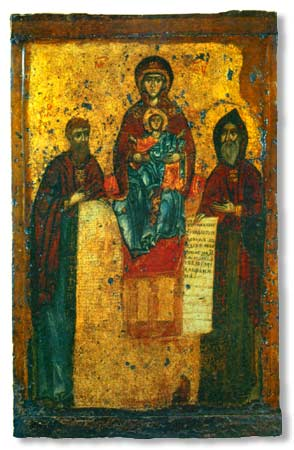
Theotokos Panachranta, Svensky Monastery

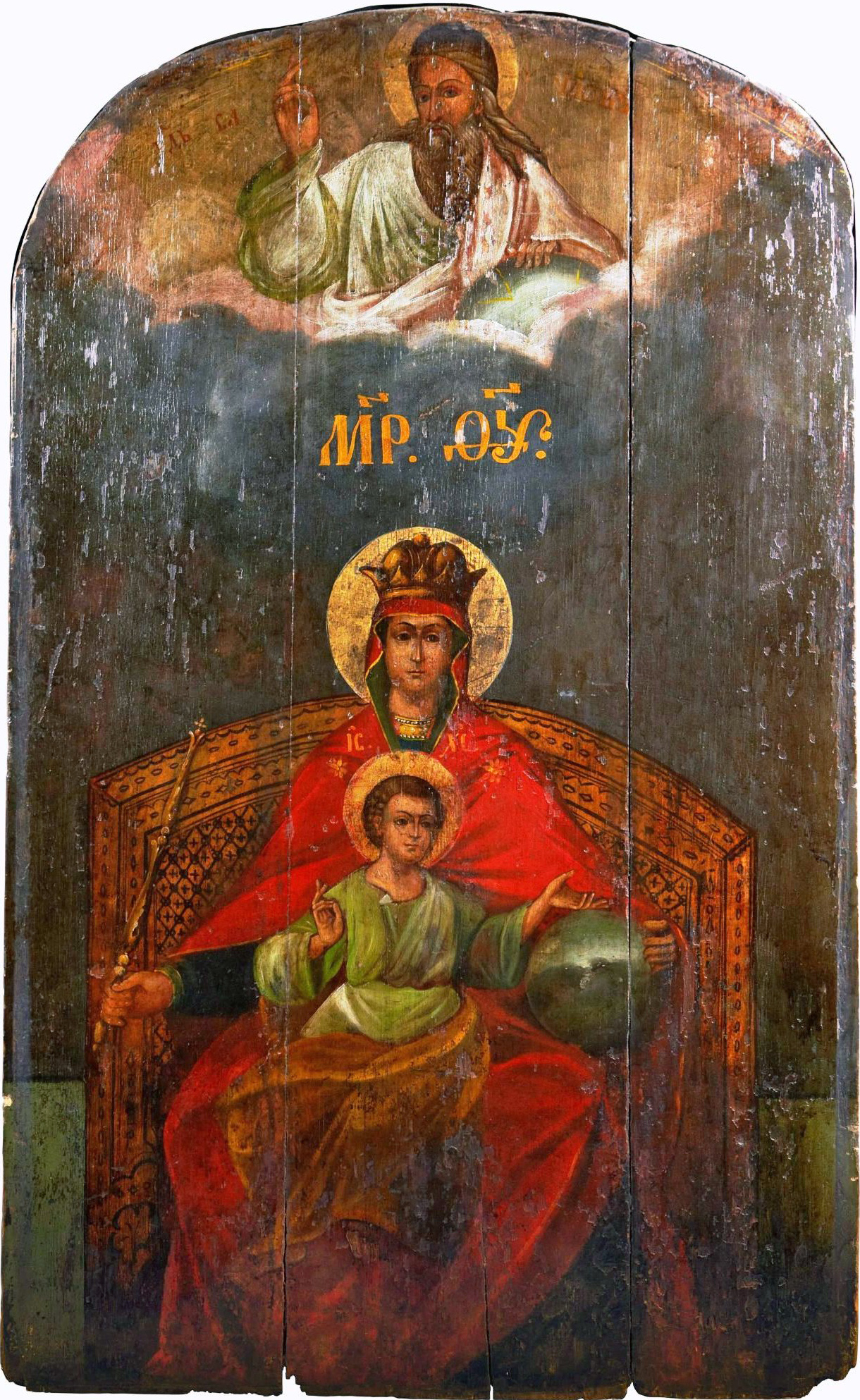
the "Enthroned" icon

== See also ==
- Aeiparthenos (icon)
- Immaculate Conception
