= Conception of the Blessed Virgin Mary =

Conception of the Blessed Virgin Mary may refer to:

- The Roman Catholic Feast of the Immaculate Conception (celebrated December 8)
- The Orthodox Christian Conception of the Virgin Mary (celebrated December 9)
- The Anglican Communion Conception of the Blessed Virgin Mary (celebrated December 8)
