= September 2 (Eastern Orthodox liturgics) =

Day in the Eastern Orthodox liturgical calendar

Eastern Orthodox liturgical calendar
September 1	September 2	September 3
September 2 O.S. ≍ September 15 N.S. September 2 N.S ≍ August 20 O.S.

An Eastern Orthodox cross

September 2 in Eastern Orthodox liturgical calendars is a feast day and a day of commemoration of saints and martyrs. Although some Orthodox churches use the Revised Julian Calendar and others use the traditional Julian calendar, the fixed commemorations for their respective September 2 are broadly the same, no matter which calendar is used. (Note: Despite the dates being the same, the days to which they refer typically differ by 13 days. The notation Old Style or O.S. is sometimes used to indicate a date in the traditional Julian Calendar (the "Old Calendar"). The notation New Style or N.S. indicates a date in the Revised Julian calendar (the "New Calendar").)

== Saints ==
- Righteous Eleazar, son of Righteous Aaron, and Righteous Phineas (c. 1400 B.C.)
- Martyrs Mamas of Caesarea in Cappadocia, and his parents, Theodotus and Rufina (3rd century)
- 3,628 Martyrs at Nicomedia (303–305) (see also: September 4)
- Martyr Diomedes, by the sword. (Note: "Also, the holy martyrs Diomedes, Julian, Philip, Euthychian, Hesychius, Leonides, Philadelphus, Menalippus, and Pantagapas. They consummated their martyrdom, some by fire, some by water, others by the sword or by the cross.")
- Martyr Julian, beaten to death.
- Martyr Philip, by the sword.
- Martyr Eutychianos, roasted alive on a gridiron.
- Martyr Hesychius, by hanging.
- Martyr Leonides, by fire.
- Martyr Eutychios, by crucifixion.
- Martyr Philadelphos, by tying a heavy stone around his neck. (Note: (in Greek) «λίθῳ τὸν τράχηλον βαρυνθεῖς τελειούται».)
- Martyr Melanippos, by fire.
- Martyr Parthagape, by drowning.
- Martyrs of Aeithalas and Ammon of Adrianople, Thrace, by severe whipping.
- Saint John the Faster, Patriarch of Constantinople (595)
- Saint Kosmas the Hermit and Confessor, of Crete (658)

== Pre-Schism Western saints ==
- Saint Antoninus of Pamiers, an early martyr at Pamiers in France. (Note: "At Pamiers, in France, St. Antoninus, martyr, whose relics are kept with great veneration in the church of Palencia.")
- Saint Maxima, a Roman slave who was scourged to death in Rome, condemned to death together with St Ansanus (304) (Note: "At Rome, the holy martyr Maxima, who confessed Christ with St. Ansanus in the persecution of Diocletian, and yielded up her soul whilst she was beaten with rods.")
- Saint Justus of Lyon, Bishop of Lyon (390) (Note: A deacon in Vienne who became Bishop of Lyon in France in 350. In 381 he attended the Council of Aquileia and then went to Egypt and lived as a hermit.) (Note: "At Lyon, in France, St. Justus, bishop and confessor, who was endowed with extraordinary sanctity, and a prophetic spirit. He resigned his bishopric, and retired into a desert of Egypt, with his lector Viator. When he had for some years led an almost angelical life, and the end of his meritorious labors had come, he went to our Lord to receive the crown of justice, on the 14th day of October. His holy body, together with the relics of his blessed lector Viator, was afterwards taken to Lyon on this day.") (Note: See: (in French) Just de Lyon. Wikipédia. (French Wikipedia).)
- Saint Valentine, fourth Bishop of Strasbourg in France (4th century)
- Saint Castor of Apt, Bishop of Apt (c. 420) (Note: Born in Nîmes in France, he married and settled in Marseilles. After a short time they separated by mutual consent and both entered monasteries. Castor founded the monastery of Manauque, and shortly afterwards became Bishop of Apt.)
- Saint Elpidius, Bishop of Lyon, Confessor (422) (Note: The successor of St Antiochus as Bishop of Lyon in France. His relics were enshrined in the church of St Justus.)
- Saint Nonnosus, a monk at the monastery of Mt Soracte in Italy; his wonderful deeds were recorded by St Gregory the Great (c. 575) (Note: "On Mount Soractes, the abbot St. Nonnosus, who, by his prayers removed a rock of huge dimensions, and was renowned for other miracles.")
- Saint Hieu, Abbess of Tadcaster, England (c. 657) (Note: She became a nun and then Abbess of Tadcaster in Yorkshire in England.)
- Saint Agricola of Avignon (Agricolus), Bishop of Avignon (c. 700) (Note: Son of St Magnus, Bishop of Avignon. At the age of sixteen he became a monk at Lérins where he stayed for sixteen years. His father called him to Avignon and in 660 he became bishop there and is considered to be the patron-saint of the town.)
- Saint Lolanus, a bishop in Scotland (c. 1034)

== Post-Schism Orthodox saints ==
- Saints Anthony (1073) and Theodosius (1074), founders of the Kyiv Pechersk Lavra and monasticism in Rus'.

=== New martyrs and confessors ===
- New Hieromartyr Barsanuphius (Lebedev), Bishop of Kyrillov (1918) (Note: See: (in Russian) Варсонофий (Лебедев, Василий Павлович). Википедии. (Russian Wikipedia).)
- New Hieromartyr John Ivanov, Priest (1918)
- New Martyr Seraphima (Sulimova), Abbess of the Therapontov Convent (1918)
- New Martyrs Anatoly Barashkov, Nicholas Burlakov, Michael Trubnikov, and Philip Marishev, at the St. Cyril of White Lake Monastery (1918)
- New Hieromartyr Damascene (Tsedrik), Bishop of Starodub (1937) (Note: See: (in Russian) Дамаскин (Цедрик). Википедии. (Russian Wikipedia).)
- New Hieromartyrs Ephemius Goryachev, John Melnichenko, John Smolichev, Vladimir Morinsky, (Note: See: (in Russian) Моринский, Владимир Александрович. Википедии. (Russian Wikipedia).) Victor Basov, Basil Zelensky, Theodotus Shatokhin, Peter Novoselsky, Stephen Yaroshevich, Priests (1937)
- New Hieromartyr Herman (Ryashentsev), Bishop of Vyaznikov (1937) (Note: See: (in Russian) Герман (Ряшенцев). Википедии. (Russian Wikipedia).)
- New Hieromartyr Stephen Ermolin, Priest (1937)
- Martyr Paul Elkyn (1937)
- Virgin-martyr Xenia (1937)

== Other commemorations ==
- "Kaluga" Icon of the Most Holy Theotokos (1771) (Note: See: (in Russian) Калужская икона Божией Матери. Википедии. (Russian Wikipedia).)
- Translation of the relics (1796) of Venerable Theodosius, Abbot of Totma (1568) (Note: See: (in Russian) Феодосий Тотемский. Википедии. (Russian Wikipedia).)
- Synaxis of the Saints of Saratov.
- Repose of Archbishop Vladimir (Petrov) of Kazan (1897) (Note: See: (in Russian) Владимир (Петров). Википедии. (Russian Wikipedia).)

== Icon gallery ==
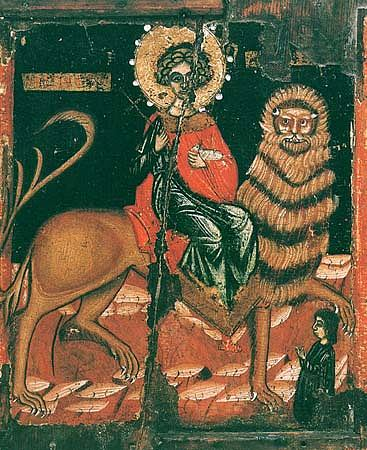
Martyr Mamas of Caesarea in Cappadocia.

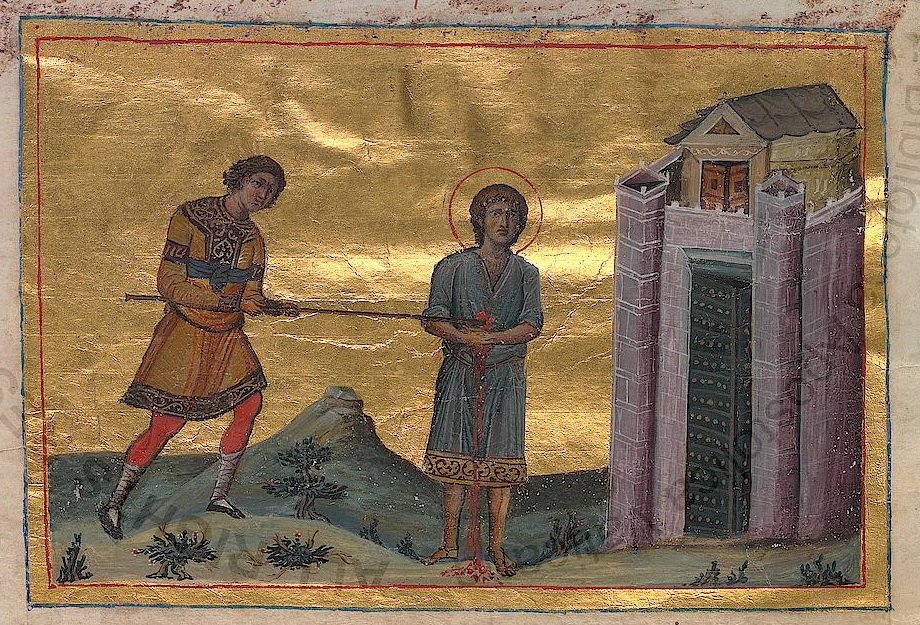
Martyr Mamas of Caesarea in Cappadocia.
(Menologion of Basil II, 10th century).

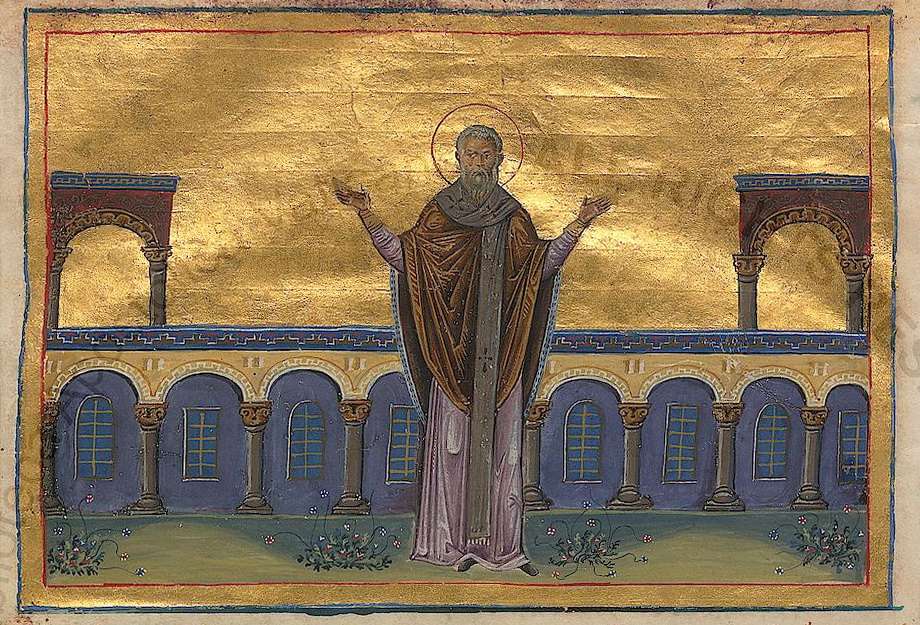
Saint John the Faster, Patriarch of Constantinople.
(Menologion of Basil II, 10th century).

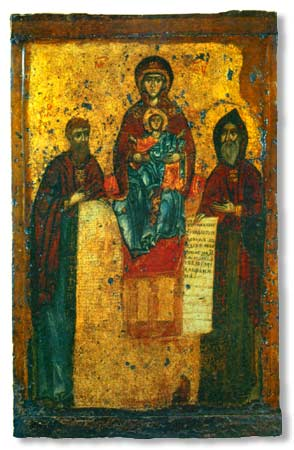
Sts. Anthony and Theodosius with the Theotokos Panachrantos.

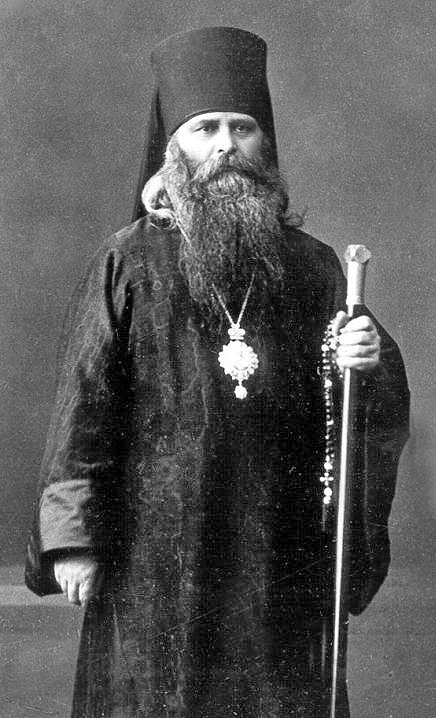
New Hieromartyr Barsanuphius (Lebedev), Bishop of Kyrillov.

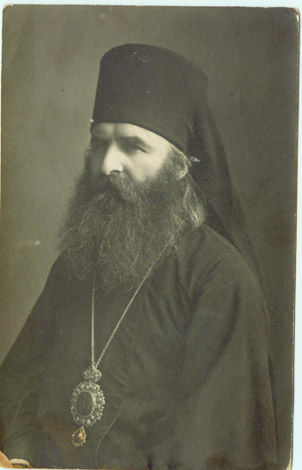
New Hieromartyr Damascene (Tsedrik), Bishop of Starodub.

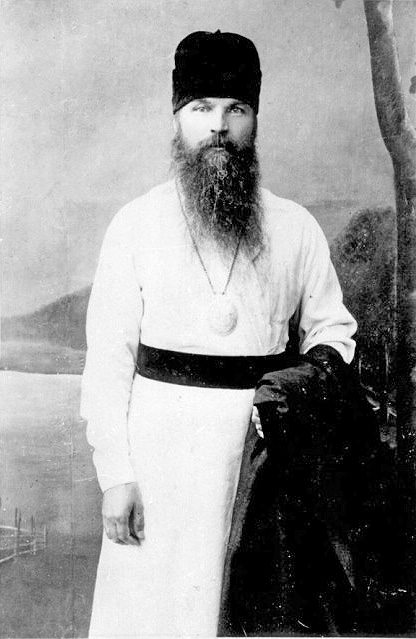
New Hieromartyr Herman (Ryashentsev), Bishop of Vyaznikov.

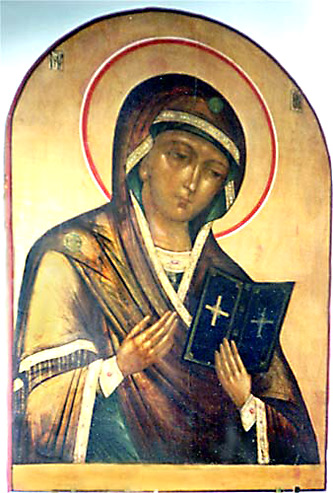
"Kaluga" Icon of the Most Holy Theotokos.

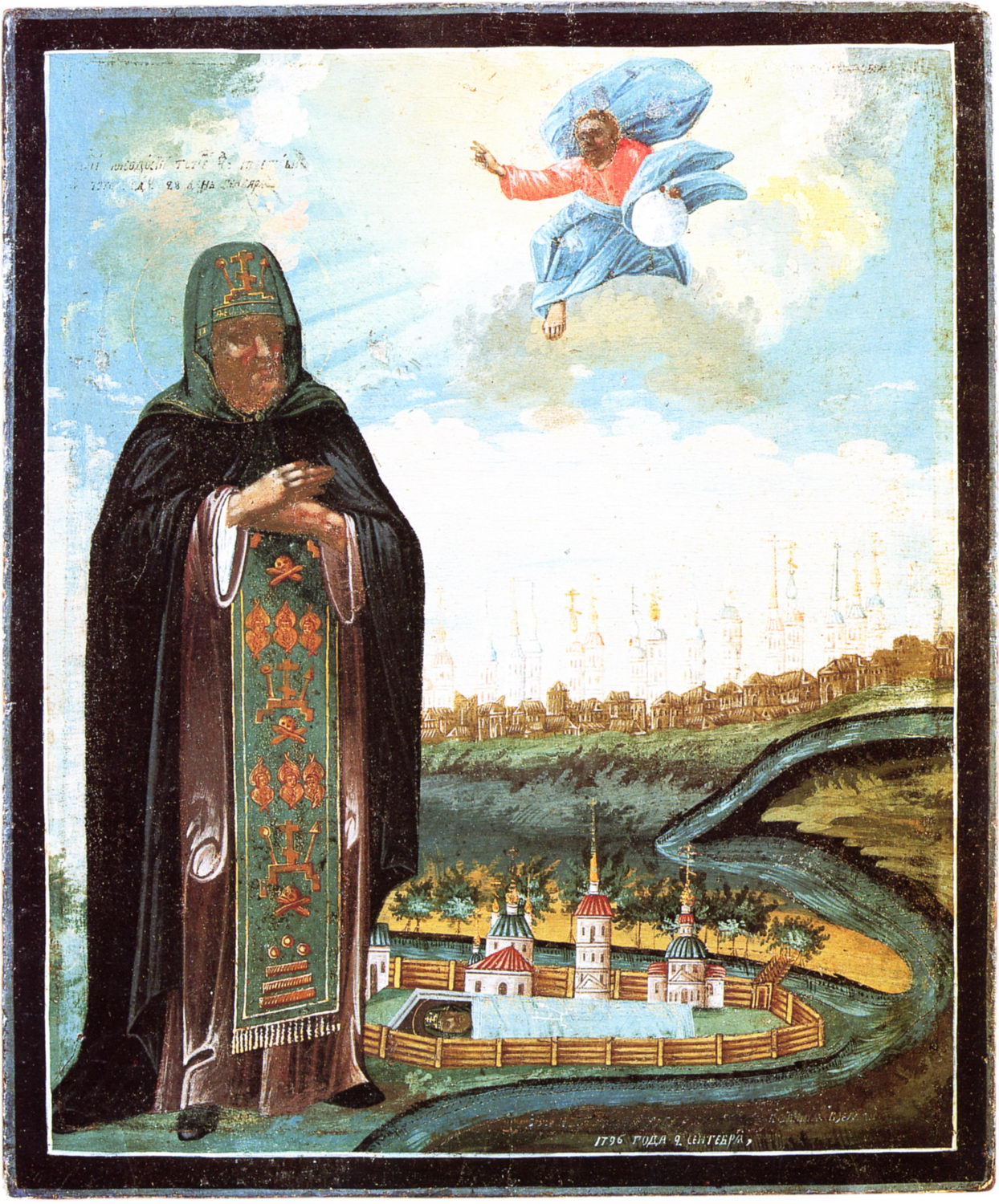
Venerable Theodosius, Abbot of Totma

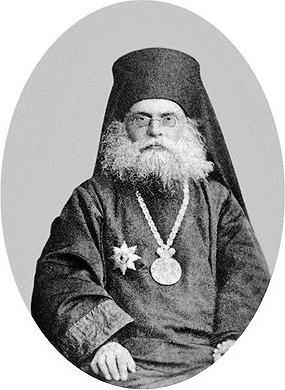
Archbishop Vladimir (Petrov) of Kazan.

== Sources ==
- September 2/September 15. Orthodox Calendar (PRAVOSLAVIE.RU).
- September 15 / September 2. HOLY TRINITY RUSSIAN ORTHODOX CHURCH (A parish of the Patriarchate of Moscow).
- September 2. OCA - The Lives of the Saints.
- The Autonomous Orthodox Metropolia of Western Europe and the Americas (ROCOR). St. Hilarion Calendar of Saints for the year of our Lord 2004. St. Hilarion Press (Austin, TX). p. 65.
- The Second Day of the Month of September. Orthodoxy in China.
- September 2. Latin Saints of the Orthodox Patriarchate of Rome.
- The Roman Martyrology. Transl. by the Archbishop of Baltimore. Last Edition, According to the Copy Printed at Rome in 1914. Revised Edition, with the Imprimatur of His Eminence Cardinal Gibbons. Baltimore: John Murphy Company, 1916. pp. 267–279.
- Rev. Richard Stanton. A Menology of England and Wales, or, Brief Memorials of the Ancient British and English Saints Arranged According to the Calendar, Together with the Martyrs of the 16th and 17th Centuries. London: Burns & Oates, 1892. p. 434.

Greek Sources

- Great Synaxaristes: (in Greek) 2 ΣΕΠΤΕΜΒΡΙΟΥ. ΜΕΓΑΣ ΣΥΝΑΞΑΡΙΣΤΗΣ.
- (in Greek) Συναξαριστής. 2 Σεπτεμβρίου. ECCLESIA.GR. (H ΕΚΚΛΗΣΙΑ ΤΗΣ ΕΛΛΑΔΟΣ).
- (in Greek) 02/09/2026. Ορθόδοξος Συναξαριστής.

Russian Sources

- (in Russian) 15 сентября (2 сентября). Православная Энциклопедия под редакцией Патриарха Московского и всея Руси Кирилла (электронная версия). (Orthodox Encyclopedia - Pravenc.ru).
- (in Russian) 2 сентября по старому стилю / 15 сентября по новому стилю. Русская Православная Церковь - Православный церковный календарь на 2026 год.
