= Barlaam of Kiev =

Saint Barlaam of the Caves
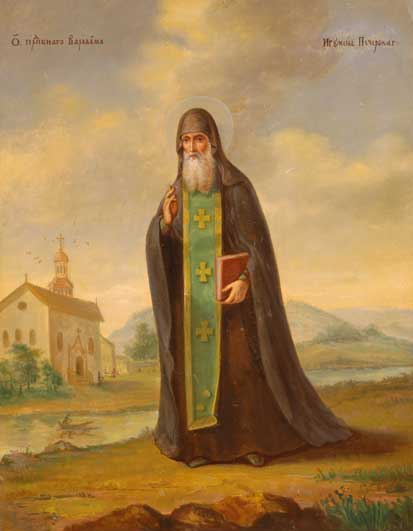
- Icon of the saint in the Academic style
- Born: Late 10th Century to Early 11th Century; Kievan Rus'
- Died: 1065; Zymne Monastery, Volodymyr, Principality of Volhynia, Kievan Rus'
- Resting place: Near Caves
- Honored in: Eastern Orthodox Church

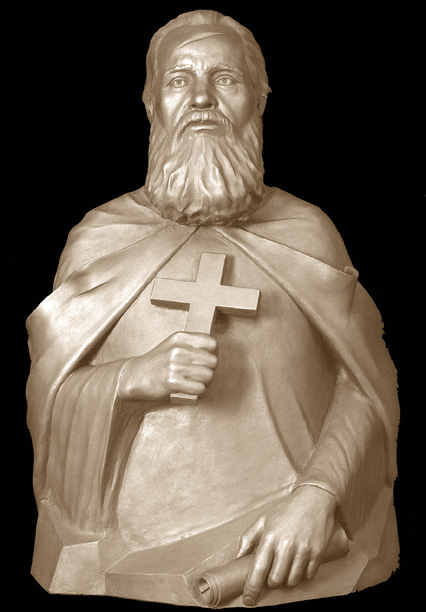
Forensic facial reconstruction by S. A. Nikitin

Barlaam of Kiev (died 1065) was the first abbot of the Kiev Pechersk Lavra, serving together with St. Anthony of Kiev. He is regarded as a saint of the Russian Orthodox Church, with a feast day of 19 November.

== Biography ==
Barlaam was born sometime between the late 10th century and early 11th century to a boyar.

He was tonsured a monk against the wishes of his father by St. Nikon of the Kiev Caves.

In 1058, he built a wooden church dedicated to the Dormition of the Theotokos with the blessing of St. Anthony.

Barlaam made 2 pilgrimages in his life, first to the Holy Land in 1062, followed by a second pilgrimage to Constantinople afterwards.

Soon after his second pilgrimage, Barlaam died in 1065 in the Zymne Monastery. He was buried on his orders in the Caves of St. Anthony.

== Veneration ==
Saint Barlaam of Kiev is venerated as a saint in the Eastern Orthodox Church. His primary feast day is on 19 November, however he is also commemorated on 28 September and on the Second Sunday of Great Lent.
