= Marian feast days =

Specific days celebrated in honour of Mary, the mother of Jesus

Marian feast days in the liturgical year are celebrated in honour of the Blessed Virgin Mary. The number of Marian feasts celebrated, their names (and at times dates) can vary among Christian denominations.

== History and development ==
=== Early history ===
The earliest feasts that relate to Mary grew out of the cycle of feasts that celebrate the Nativity of Jesus Christ. Given that according to the Gospel of Luke (Luke 2:22–40), forty days after the birth of Jesus, along with the Presentation of Jesus at the Temple, Mary was purified according to Jewish customs, the Feast of the Purification began to be celebrated by the 5th century, and became the Feast of Simeon in Byzantium.

The origin of Marian feasts is lost to history. Although there are references to specific Marian feasts introduced into the liturgies in later centuries, there are indications that Christians celebrated Mary very early on. Methodius, a bishop (died 311) from the 3rd and early 4th century, wrote:

And what shall I conceive, what shall I speak worthy of this day? I am struggling to reach the inaccessible, for the remembrance of this holy virgin far transcends all words of mine. Wherefore, since the greatness of the panegyric required completely puts to shame our limited powers, let us betake ourselves to that hymn which is not beyond our faculties, and boasting in our own unalterable defeat, let us join the rejoicing chorus of Christ’s flock, who are keeping holy-day ... We keep festival, not according to the vain customs of the Greek mythology; we keep a feast which brings with it no ridiculous or frenzied banqueting of the gods, but which teaches us the wondrous condescension to us men of the awful glory of Him who is God over all ... Do thou, therefore, O lover of this festival ...

A separate feast for Mary, connected with the Christmastide, originated in the 5th century, even perhaps before the First Council of Ephesus of 431. It seems certain that the sermon by Proclus before Nestorius (the Archbishop of Constantinople whose Nestorianism rejected the title of Theotokos) which began the controversy that led to the council was about a feast for the Virgin Mary.

In the 8th and 9th centuries four more Marian feasts were established in the Eastern Church. Byzantine Emperor Maurice selected August 15 as the date of the feast of Dormition and Assumption. The feast of the Nativity of Mary was perhaps started in the first half of the 7th century in the Eastern Church. In the Western Church a feast dedicated to Mary, just before Christmas was celebrated in the Churches of Milan and Ravenna in Italy in the 7th century. The four Roman Marian feasts of Purification, Annunciation, Assumption and Nativity of Mary were gradually and sporadically introduced into England and by the 11th century were being celebrated there.

=== Development of feasts ===
Over time, the number and nature of feasts (and the associated Titles of Mary) and the venerative practices that accompany them have varied a great deal among diverse Christian traditions. Overall, there are significantly more titles, feasts and venerative Marian practices among Roman Catholics than any other Christian tradition.

Some differences in feasts originate from doctrinal issues – the Feast of the Assumption is such an example. Given that there is no agreement among all Christians on the circumstances of the death, Dormition or Assumption of Mary, the Feast of the Assumption is celebrated among some denominations and not others. In his early years, Martin Luther used to celebrate the Feast of the Assumption, but towards the end of his life he stopped celebrating it.

While the Western Catholics celebrate the Feast of the Assumption on 15 August, some Eastern Catholics celebrate it as Dormition of the Mother of God, and may do so on 28 August, if they follow the Julian calendar. The Eastern Orthodox also celebrate it as the Dormition of the Mother of God, one of their 12 Great Feasts. The Armenian Apostolic Church celebrates the Feast of Dormition not on a fixed date, but on the Sunday nearest 15 August. Moreover, the practices apart from doctrinal differences also vary, e.g. for the Eastern Orthodox the feast is preceded by the 14-day Dormition Fast.

Feasts continue to be developed, e.g. the feast of the Queenship of Mary was declared in 1954 in the papal encyclical Ad Caeli Reginam by Pope Pius XII. The initial ceremony for this feast involved the crowning of the Salus Populi Romani icon of the Virgin Mary in Rome by Pius XII as part of a procession in Rome, and is unique to Roman Catholics.

Other differences in feasts relate to specific events that occurred in history. For instance, the Feast of Our Lady of Victory (later renamed Feast of Our Lady of the Rosary) was based on the 1571 victory of the Papal States against the Ottoman Empire in the Battle of Lepanto, is hence unique to Roman Catholics.

== By Christian denomination ==
=== Western Christianity ===
==== In the Catholic Church ====
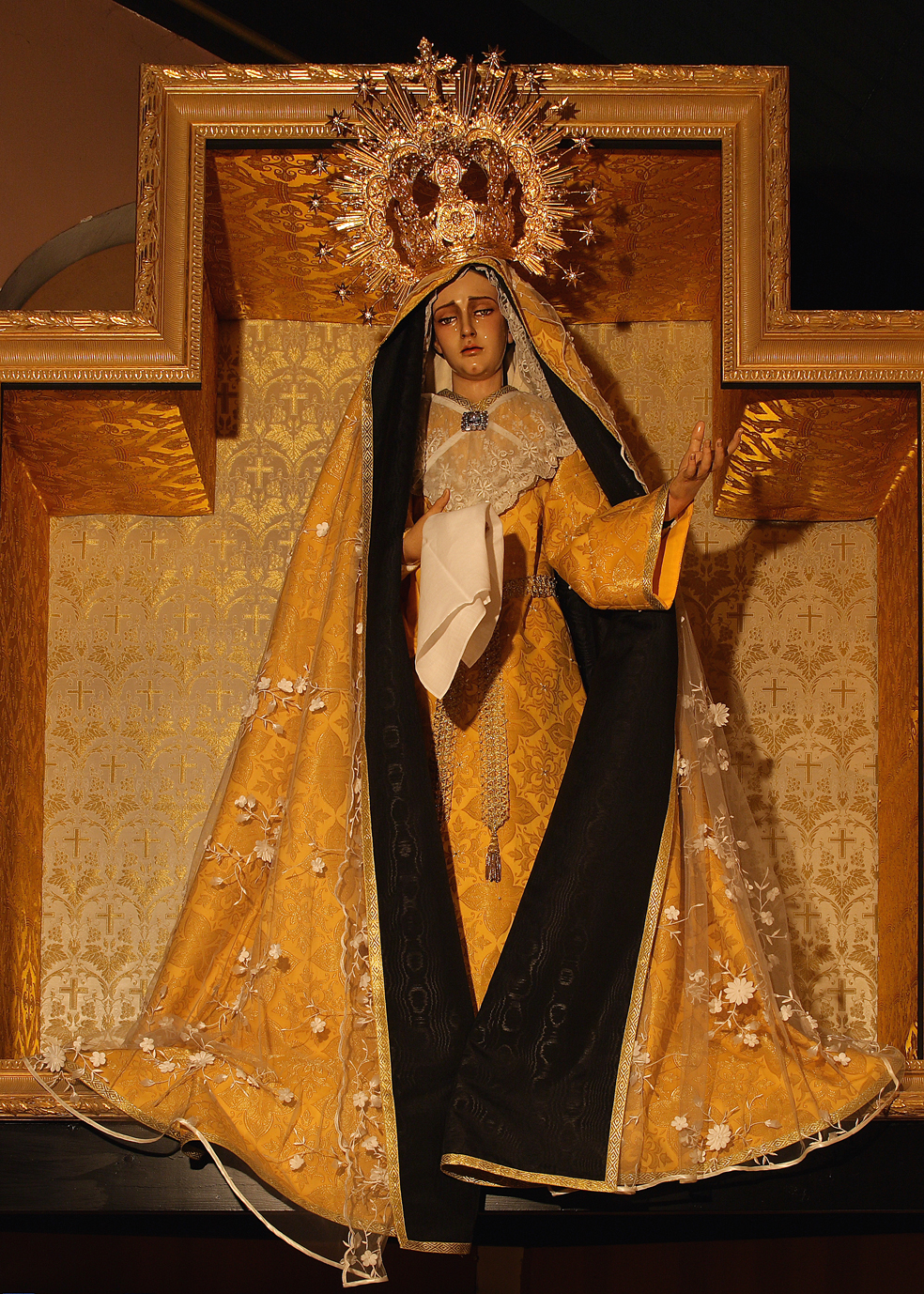
Marian art is at times used to reflect Marian feasts. This statue of Our Lady of Sorrows in the hermitage church of Warfhuizen, the Netherlands, is dressed for the month of October.

The most prominent Marian feast days in the General Roman Calendar are:

- **January 1: Solemnity of Mary, Mother of God**
- **March 25: Feast of the Annunciation**
- **May 31 (in some regions July 2): The Visitation of the Blessed Virgin Mary**
- Monday after Pentecost: Mary, Mother of the Church (new in the General Roman Calendar as of 2018)
- Day after the Solemnity of the Most Sacred Heart of Jesus: The Immaculate Heart of Mary
- August 5: The Dedication of the Basilica of Saint Mary Major (Santa Maria Maggiore; also known as Saint Mary of the Snows)
- **August 15: Solemnity of the Assumption of the Blessed Virgin Mary**
- August 22: The Queenship of the Blessed Virgin Mary
- **September 8: The Nativity of the Blessed Virgin Mary**; also known as **Marymas**
- September 12: The Most Holy Name of the Blessed Virgin Mary
- September 15: Our Lady of Sorrows
- October 7: Our Lady of the Rosary
- November 21: The Presentation of the Blessed Virgin Mary
- **December 8: Solemnity of the Immaculate Conception of the Blessed Virgin Mary**

Note: Solemnities and feasts are in bold face. Memorials are in regular face.

Optional Marian memorials in the General Roman Calendar are:

- February 11: Our Lady of Lourdes
- May 13: Our Lady of Fatima
- July 16: Our Lady of Mount Carmel
- December 10: Our Lady of Loreto
- December 12: Our Lady of Guadalupe

There are many more Marian commemorations celebrated in various localities, but not included in the General Roman Calendar.

May devotions to the Blessed Virgin Mary take place in many Catholic regions. The devotion was promoted by the Jesuits and spread to Jesuit colleges and to the entire Latin Church and since that time it has been a regular feature of Catholic life. Marian devotions may be held within the family, around a "May Altar" consisting of a table with a Marian picture decorated with many May flowers. The family would then pray together the rosary. May devotions exist in the entire Latin church and since that time have been a regular feature of Catholic life.

In the Catholic Church, traditionally the month of October is called "rosary month", since the faithful are encouraged to pray the rosary. Since 1571, the Festum Beatae Mariae Virginis a Rosario (Feast of the Blessed Virgin Mary of the Rosary), is celebrated on October 7. In 2005 Pope Benedict XVI stated:

The month of October is dedicated to the Holy Rosary, the unique contemplative prayer through which, guided by the Lord's Heavenly Mother, we fix our gaze on the face of the Redeemer in order to be conformed to his joyful, light-filled, sorrowful and glorious mysteries. This ancient prayer is having a providential revival, thanks also to the example and teaching of the beloved Pope John Paul II. I invite you to reread his Apostolic Letter Rosarium Virginis Mariae and to put into practice its directions on the personal, family and community levels.

==== In the Lutheran Churches ====
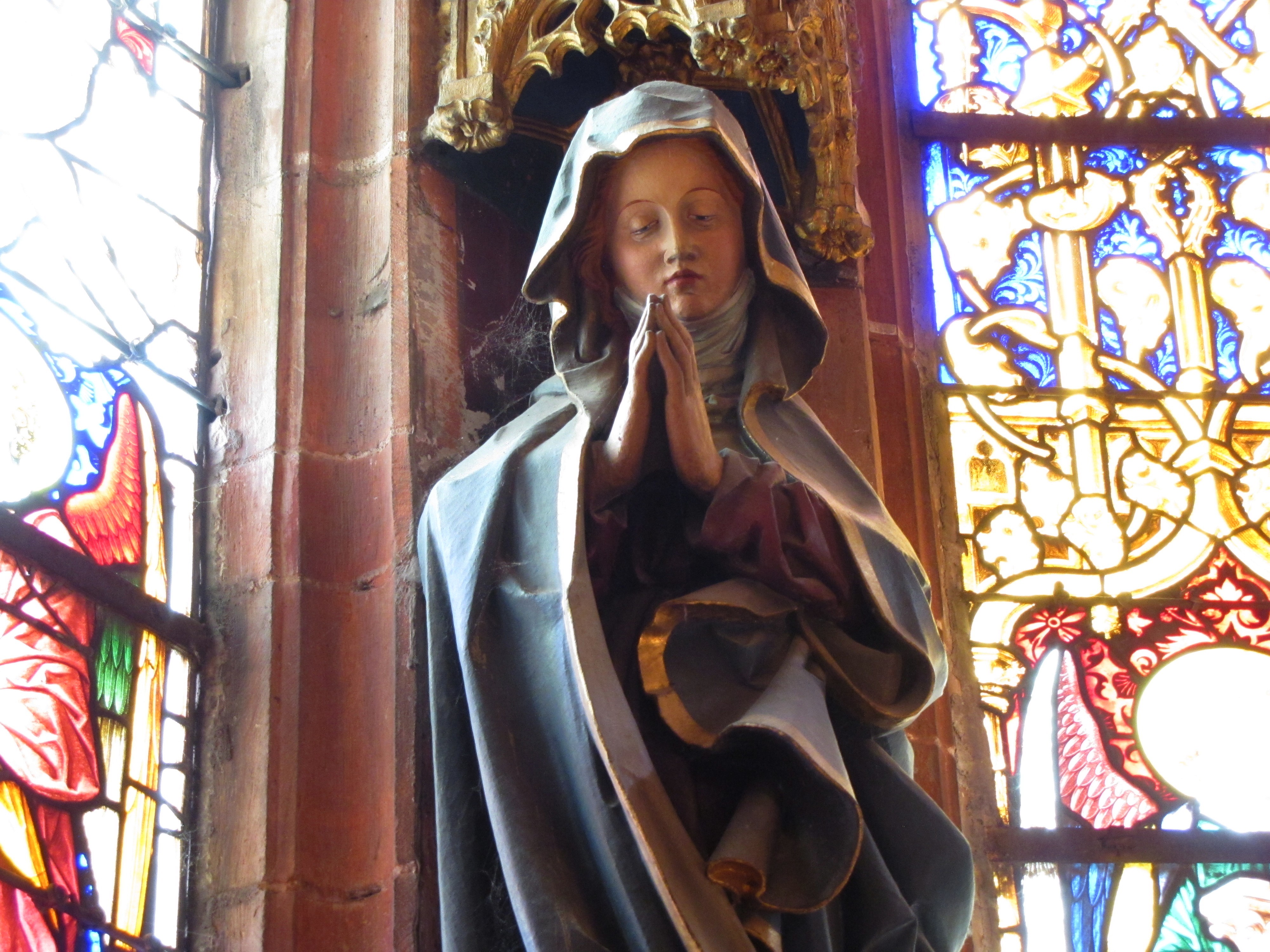
A statue of the Blessed Virgin Mary in the Evangelical-Lutheran church of Saint-Pierre-le-Jeune, Strasbourg

The Evangelical-Lutheran Churches have retained the traditional medieval Marian feast days. Evangelical-Lutherans maintain a devotion to the Blessed Virgin Mary, referring to her by that title. The following are Marian festivals celebrated within the Evangelical-Lutheran liturgical calendar:

- February 2: Presentation of the Lord, usually referred to as "The Purification of the Blessed Virgin Mary and the Presentation of Our Lord" together (sometimes the order of terms is switched for emphasis), also known as Candlemas
- March 25: Annunciation of Our Lord
- May 31: The Visitation of the Virgin Mary to Elizabeth
- August 15: Mary, Mother of Our Lord (most refer to it simply as St. Mary's Day instead of the Assumption, and some prefer to call it the Dormition)
- September 8: The Nativity of the Blessed Virgin Mary also known as Marymas
- November 21: The Presentation of the Blessed Virgin Mary
- December 8: The Immaculate Conception of the Blessed Virgin Mary (Conception of Mary) (although they almost never use the term "immaculate" and very few observe this due to its Roman Catholic association)

When Johann Sebastian Bach worked as Thomaskantor in Leipzig, three Marian feasts were observed for which he composed church cantatas:

- February 2: Purification
- March 25: Annunciation
- July 2: Visitation

==== In the Anglican Communion ====
In calendars throughout the Anglican Communion and Continuing Anglican churches, the following Marian feasts may be observed, although the practice of different provinces varies widely:

- February 2: The Purification of the Blessed Virgin
- February 11: Our Lady of Lourdes
- March 25: The Annunciation of Our Saviour to the Blessed Virgin Mary (Lady Day)
- May 31: The Visitation of the Blessed Virgin Mary
- August 15: The Blessed Virgin Mary or "The Falling Asleep of the Blessed Virgin Mary"
- September 8: The Nativity of the Blessed Virgin Mary
- October 15: Our Lady of Walsingham (Catholic feast on September 24, since 2001)
- December 8: The Conception of the Blessed Virgin Mary

=== Eastern Christianity ===
==== In the Eastern Orthodox Church ====
Among the most prominent Marian feast days in the Eastern Orthodox and Greek-Catholic liturgical calendars are:

- **February 2: Purification of the Most Holy Theotokos**
- **March 25: Annunciation of the Theotokos**
- March 30: The Visitation of the Blessed Virgin Mary
- Fifth Saturday in Lent: Saturday of the Akathist Hymn
- Bright Friday: Feast of the Mother of God, the Life-Giving Spring
- July 2: The Placing of the Honorable Robe of the Most Holy Mother of God at Blachernae
- July 25: Dormition of the Righteous Anna, the Mother of the Most Holy Theotokos
- 1 August: Feast to the All-Merciful Saviour and the Most Holy Mother of God.
- **August 15: Dormition of the Mother of God**
- August 31: The Placing of the Cincture (Sash) of the Mother of God
- **September 8: Nativity of the Theotokos**
- September 9: Afterfeast of the Nativity of the Mother of God, Holy and Righteous Ancestors of God, Joachim and Anna
- **October 1: Protection of Our Most Holy Lady Theotokos and Ever-Virgin Mary**
- **November 21: The Entry of the Most Holy Theotokos into the Temple**
- December 9: Feast of the Conception of the Most Holy Theotokos
- December 26: Synaxis of the Theotokos

Note: Feasts ranked among the twelve Great Feasts are in bold face. Minor feasts are in regular face.

Feast days are also established for famous icon of Mary.

The Purification of the Most Holy Theotokos is also considered a Feast of Jesus Christ.

The Protection of Our Most Holy Lady Theotokos and Ever-Virgin Mary in the Russian Church is treated as equal to the twelve Great Feasts.

During the 10th century, the Feast of the Visitation of Mary was commemorated on 1 April.

==== In the Oriental Orthodox Churches ====
In the Coptic Orthodox rite St. Mary is commemorated on the 21st of each Coptic month (Generally the 30th/31st of each Gregorian month).

- January 22 Wedding at Cana
- January 29 Dormition of Saint Mary, the Theotokos
- April 2 Apparition of Saint Mary in the Church of Zeitoun
- April 7 Annunciation of the Nativity of Christ
- May 9 Nativity of Saint Mary
- June 1 Entry of the Lord Christ into Egypt
- June 28 Commemoration of the First Church for the Virgin Mary in the City of Philippi
- August 13 Annunciation of the Nativity of Saint Mary
- August 22 Assumption of the Body of Saint Mary
- December 13 Entry of Saint Mary into the Temple at Jerusalem

In the Syriac Orthodox rite St. Mary is commemorated on the following 8 Major feast days:

- January 15 Virgin Mary of the Sowing
- March 25 Annunciation of the Virgin Mary
- May 15 Feast of the Virgin Mary of the Harvest
- August 15 Dormition and Assumption of the Virgin Mary
- September 8 Nativity of the Virgin Mary
- December 26 Glorification of the Mother of God

In the Malankara Orthodox church St. Mary is commemorated on the following feast days:

- January 1 Virgin Mary, Mother of God
- January 15 Virgin Mary of the Sowing
- March 25 Annunciation of the Virgin Mary
- May 15 Feast of the Virgin Mary of the Harvest
- August 15 Assumption of the Virgin Mary (preceded by 15 days of fasting)
- September 8 Nativity of the Virgin Mary (preceded by 8 days of fasting)
- December 26 Glorification of the Mother of God

== See also ==
- The Glories of Mary
