= Zymne Monastery =

Stauropegic Ukrainian Orthodox cave monastery atop a holy mountain

- Ukrainian: Святогірський Успенський Зимненський ставропігійний монастир
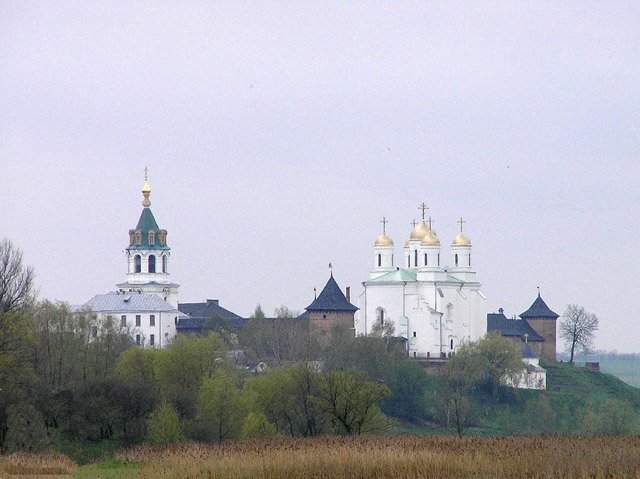
- Zymne Monastery

- Location within Volyn Oblast Location within Ukraine
- Interactive map of the Zymne Monastery area

General information
- Location: village of Zymne, near Volodymyr, Volyn Oblast, Ukraine, Ukraine
- Coordinates: 50°48′06″N 24°19′39″E
- Opened: 1458
- Owner: Ukrainian Orthodox Church (Moscow Patriarchate)

Immovable Monument of National Significance of Ukraine
- Official name: Святогорський монастир (Holy Mountain Monastery)
- Type: Architecture
- Reference no.: 030035

The Assumption Monastery at the Holy Mountain (Ukrainian: Святогірський Успенський Зимненський ставропігійний монастир, romanized: Sviatohirskyi Uspenskyi Zymnenskyi monastyr) is a stauropegial Ukrainian Orthodox cave monastery belonging to the Ukrainian Orthodox Church. It is located at the top of the Holy Mountain rising above the Luha River near the village of Zymne. It is five kilometers south of Volodymyr, Volyn Oblast, Ukraine.

== History ==
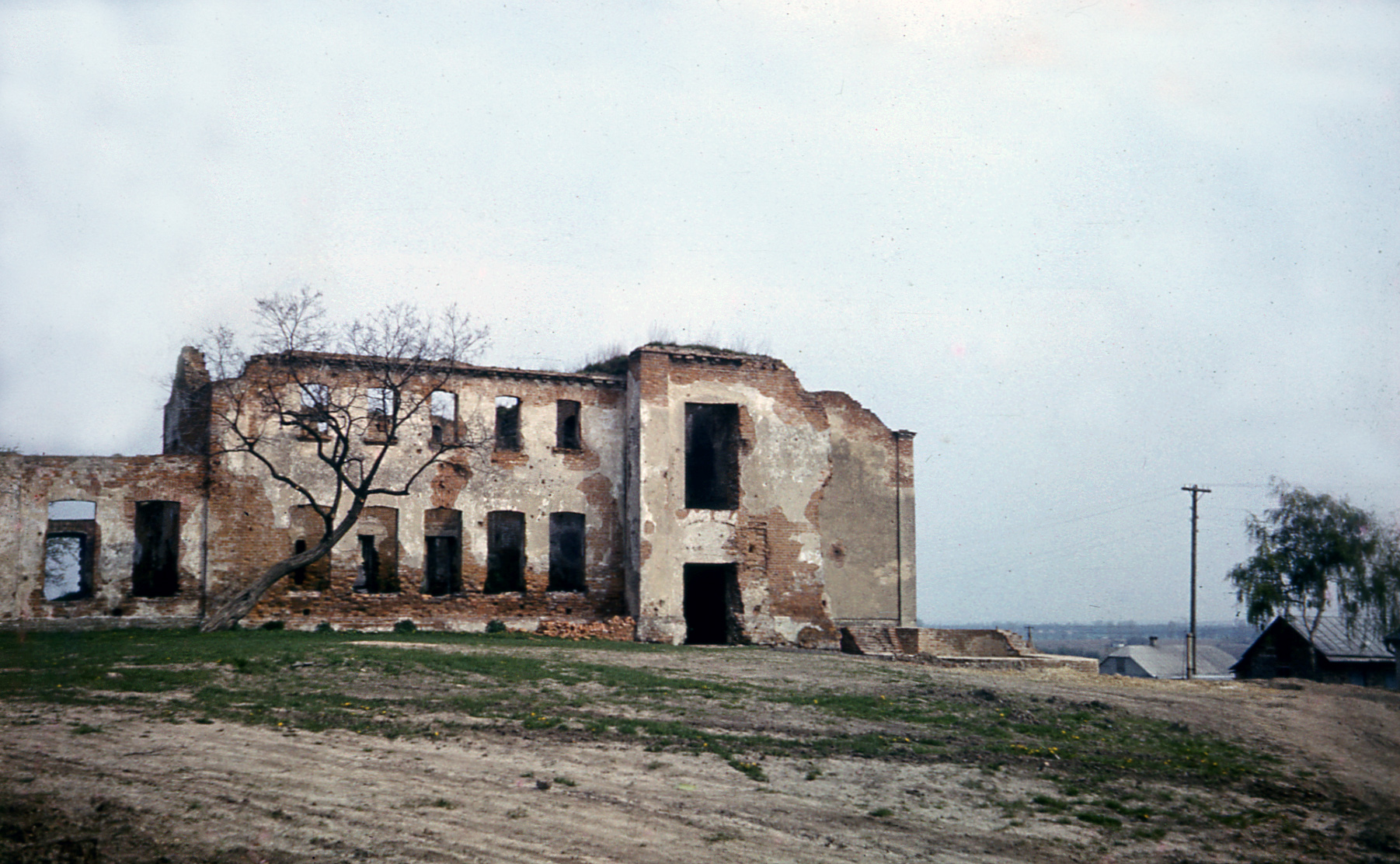
Conditions of the monastery in 1988

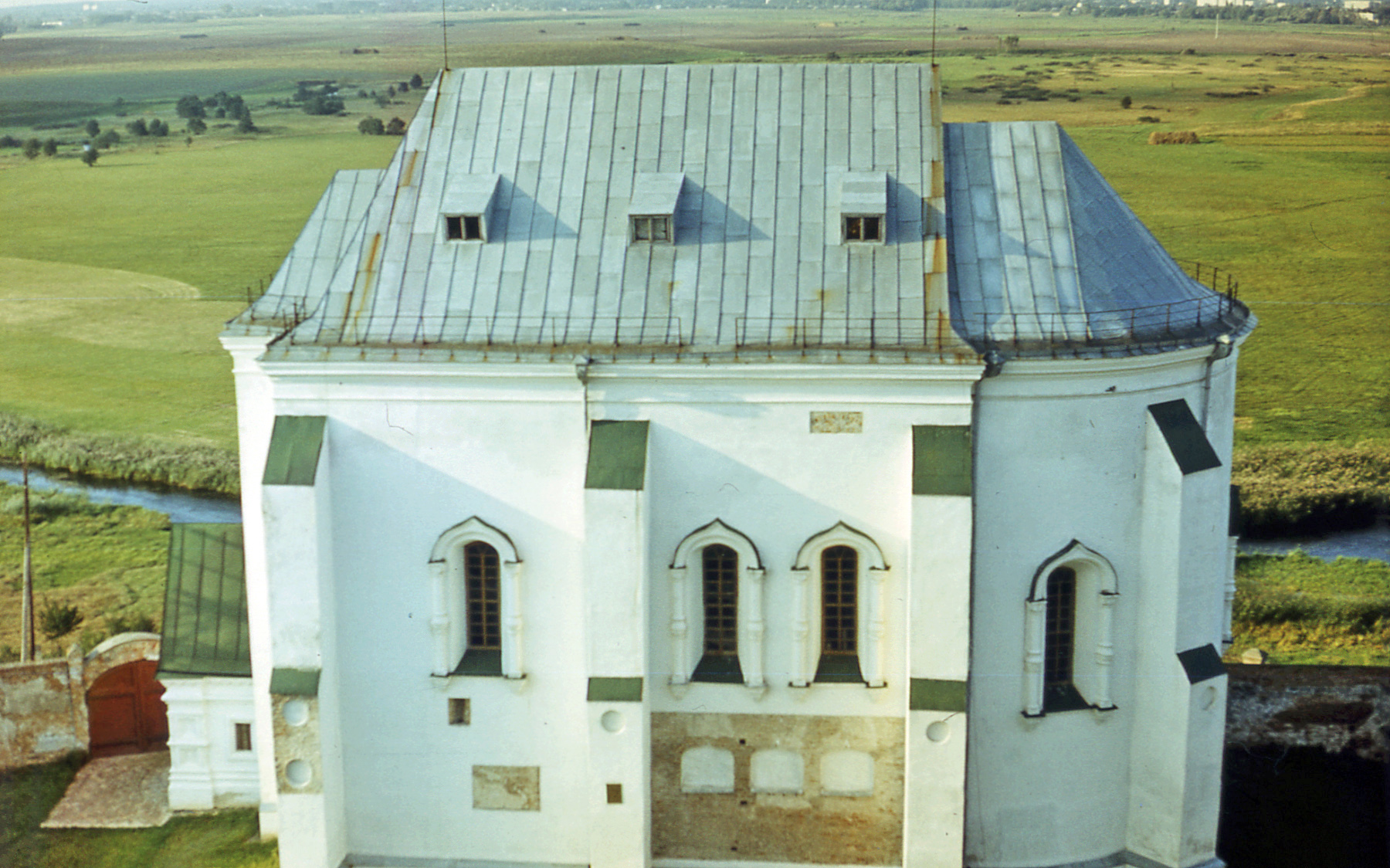
Beginning of restoration of the Assumption Church in 1988

The origin of the monastery is uncertain, but a monastic legend attributes its foundation to Vladimir the Great. He was said to have built two churches and his winter palace there, from which the village takes its name. It is also claimed that the first hegumen of the Kiev Pechersk Lavra died there on his way from Tsargrad to Kiev in the 11th century.

The monastery was first mentioned in documents in 1458. It was controlled by the Greek Orthodox Church until 1698, when it joined the Uniate Church in union with Catholic Church (Union of Brest). Within several decades, the monastic community ceased to exist.

Sometime after the third partition of Poland, in 1857 its cathedral was revived as a Ukrainian Orthodox parish church. In 1893, the monastery was re-established as a Ukrainian Orthodox nunnery. The Soviets dissolved this sisterhood after annexing Volynia in 1939 following its invasion and occupation. The convent was revived during the period of the German occupation, but reduced to a parish church in 1945 after the area became part of Soviet Ukraine. Following the dissolution of the Soviet Union, it reopened in 1990. It was given stauropegic status in 1996.

== Architecture ==
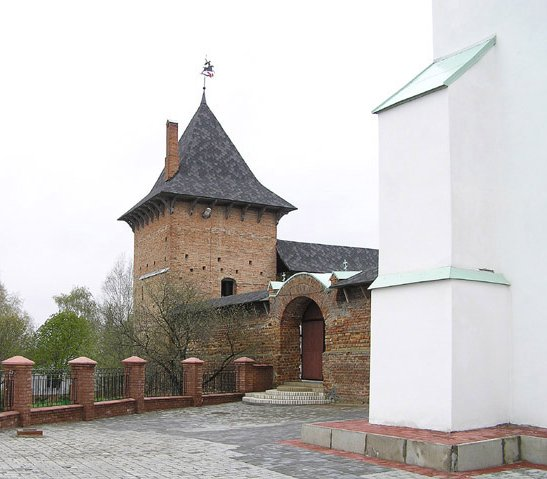
Entrance to the monastery

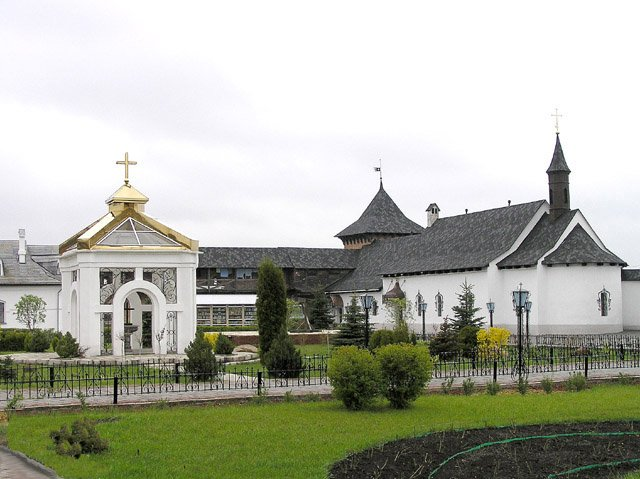
Inside the monastery

The monastery has a rectangular plan, articulated by defensive walls with towers, built in the 15th and 16th centuries. Each wall is pierced by a wide arch from the 17th century. One round tower in the southern wall was built up into a belltower in 1898-99. The style of this neo-Muscovite building is out of harmony with the quaint beauty of the other towers.

The four-pillared Assumption Katholikon was built with funds provided by Prince Fyodor Chartoryisky. He also donated two fine bells, one of which is now on exhibit on the monastery grounds. The katholikon was completed and consecrated in 1495 when the Gothic influence in the region was still paramount. It was modernized for the first time in 1550 and since then has been renovated and reconstructed, in keeping with prevalent ideology of the period. The Uniates dismantled its flanking towers in 1724 and reshaped its facade in what was then contemporary Polish fashion. The Russians redecorated the building in the Russian Revival style, but the church was damaged during World War I. It was repaired by the Poles in the 1930s. Its roofing was again destroyed during World War II. The five golden domes were added later in the 20th century.

The oldest building in the complex is the miniature Trinity Church (1465–75), a stone copy of the wooden churches of Volynia. It is situated on the mountain slope to the south of the cathedral, outside the monastery walls. A 16th-century refectory has a church dedicated to Saint Juliana; it is the oldest refectory church in the country.

Between Trinity Church and the cathedral is the entrance to the caves occupied by the earliest monks here. The caves make up two parallel corridors joined in the middle. The cave church is consecrated to Saint Barlaam.
