= Kuksha of the Kiev Caves =

Eastern Orthodox monk, missionary, and martyr (d. after 1114)

Saint Kuksha of the Kiev Caves
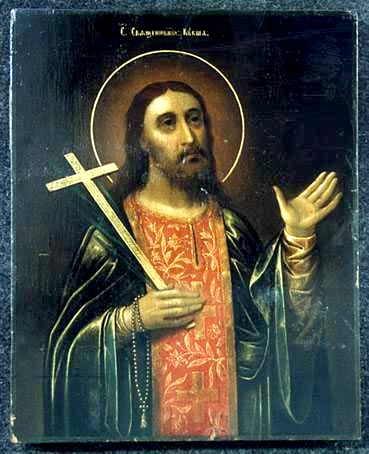
- Died: after 1114
- Venerated in: Russian Orthodox Church
- Major shrine: Near Caves
- Feast: 27 August

Kuksha of the Kiev Caves (Russian: Кукша Печерский, romanized: Kuksha Pechersky; died after 1114) was a monk and martyr from the Kiev Pechersk Lavra. He was canonized as a saint by the Russian Orthodox Church for his work in spreading Christianity among the Vyatichi in present-day Kaluga, Ryazan, and Tula oblasts of Russia.

== Life ==
Being a monk at Kiev Pechersk Lavra, he left to preach the Gospel to idol-worshippers, the Vyatichi. According to tradition, he performed numerous miracles there. Impressed by his powers and rendered receptive by his preaching, the Vyatichi began to convert and accept baptism. Priests of the Vyatichi, furious over the destruction of their idols, decapitated Kuksha and his pupil. On the day of Kuksha's death, his spiritual father, Pimen the Faster, stood in the middle of the monastery church and loudly proclaimed: "Our brother Kuksha has been killed this day". Pimen died the same day.

== Legacy ==
The memory of Kuksha, his follower, and Pimen the Faster is celebrated at the Lavra on the days of their deaths, 27 August O.S. and 27 September O.S. The relics of Saint Kuksha are kept at St. Anthony Caves of the Lavra.
