= Alypius of the Caves =

Eastern Orthodox saint, monk and painter (died 1114)

Saint Alypius of the Caves
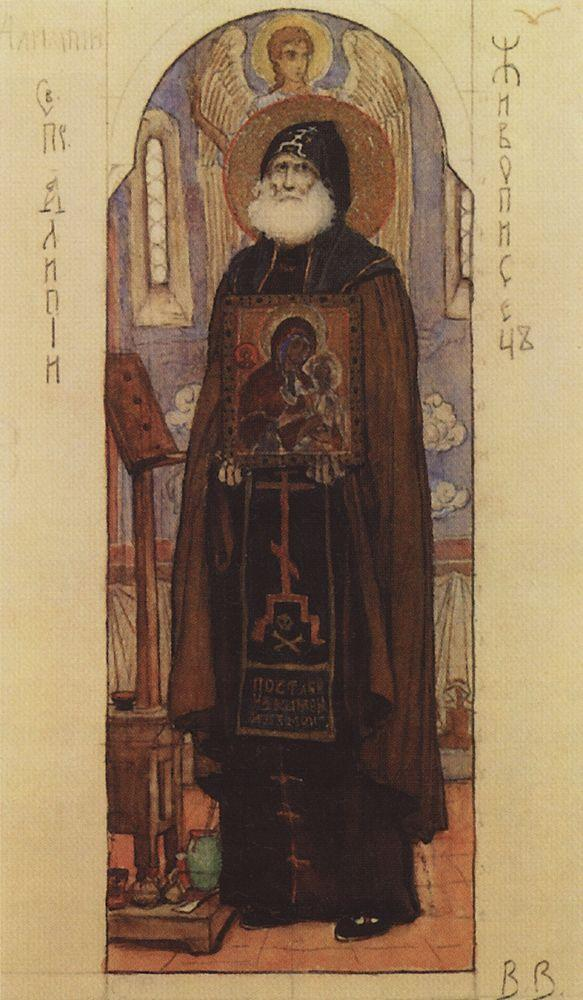
- Iconographic Sketch of Saint Alypius
- Died: 17 August 1147
- Resting place: Near Caves
- Honored in: Orthodox Church
- Feast: 17 August

Alipy of the Caves (? – 1114) (also known as 'Venerable Alypius') was an Eastern Orthodox saint, monk and famous painter of icons from the cave monastery of Kiev Pechersk Lavra. Saint Alipy was a disciple of Greek icon painters from Constantinople and considered to be the first icon painter of Kievan Rus.

According to medieval sources, Alipy created his icons with the help of God and angels. The saint took part in creation of mosaic painting in Dormition Cathedral of the Lavra. Presumably, the artist also participated in the painting of murals in St. Michael's Cathedral in Kiev. One of the icons painted by St Alypius survived and is now preserved in the State Tretyakov Gallery in Moscow. This is the Sven Icon of the Theotokos (or The Sven Caves Icon of the Mother of God) (feast days: 3 May and 17 August).

The saint died on 17 August around the year 1114. When his body was discovered, it was found that the fingers of his right hand were still formed in the Orthodox manner of making the Sign of the Cross.

The feast day of Saint Alipy is celebrated in the Eastern Orthodox Church on 17 August (for those churches which follow the Julian Calendar, 17 August currently falls on 30 August of the modern Gregorian Calendar). He is also celebrated, in common with other saints of his monastery on 28 September (11 October), the "Synaxis of the Holy Fathers of Kiev whose relics lie in the Near Caves of Saint Anthony".

His relics are preserved in Kiev Pechersk Lavra.

== Sources ==
- "Алимпий" . Brockhaus and Efron Encyclopedic Dictionary (in Russian). 1906.
