= Ivan Fyodorovich Michurin =

Russian architect

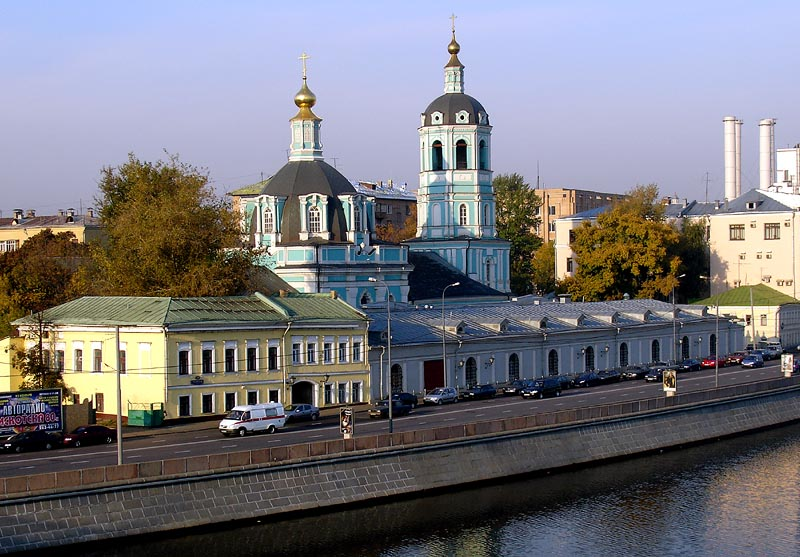
A Zamoskvorechye church attributed to I. F. Michurin.

Ivan Fyodorovich Michurin (1700–1763) was a Russian architect whose designs marked a transition of Russian architecture from early Muscovite Baroque to mature Rastrelliesque style.

Michurin studied in the Naval Academy (1718–1720) and was apprenticed to Nicola Michetti before completing his education in Holland (1723–1729). He worked primarily in Moscow, devising the first general plan of that city between 1734 and 1739. His best-known original building could be the main church of Svensky Monastery in Bryansk, although its attribution is disputed. He was also responsible for the belfry of St. Clement's Church in Moscow.

Empress Elizabeth sent him to Kiev to realize Rastrelli's design of Saint Andrew Church and Mariinskyi Palace, now Ukrainian President Palace for official government visits. Michurin's last project was the bell-tower of the Troitse-Sergiyeva Lavra, finished by his disciple Dmitry Ukhtomsky.
