= Near Caves =

Church building in Kiev, Ukraine

Coordinates: 50.4340°N 30.5614°E

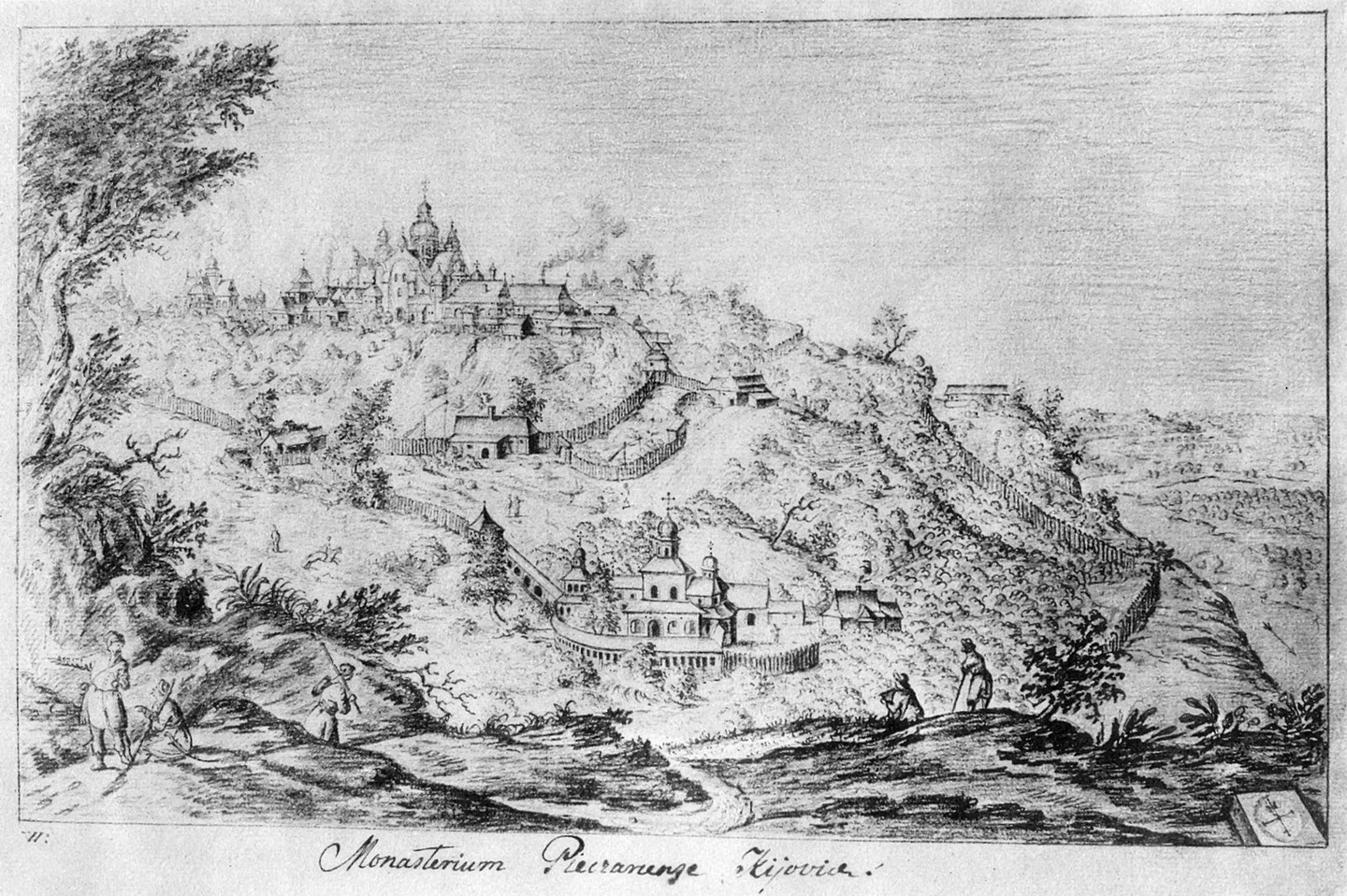
- The Near Caves of the Kyiv Pechersk Lavra. Drawn by author Abraham van Westerveld in 1651.
- Interactive map of Near Caves

Immovable Monument of National Significance of Ukraine
- Official name: Ближні печери (Near Caves)
- Type: Architecture
- Reference no.: 260088/33

A monk's underground cell, seen with icons and other items.

The Near Caves or the Caves of Saint Anthony (Ukrainian: Ближні печери, Blyzhni pechery; Russian: Ближние пещеры, Blizhnie peschery) are historic caves and a network of tunnels of the medieval cave monastery of Kyiv Pechersk Lavra in Kyiv, the capital of Ukraine. The Near Caves have a total length of 383 metres and are 5 to 20 metres deep (see map).

The Near Caves were founded when in 1057, Saint Varlaam was appointed as the first hegumen (abbot) of the Kyiv Pechersk Lavra by Saint Anthony. Monk Anthony withdrew himself from the monastery and later settled on a new hill, where he dug out a new underground cell, now called the Near Caves.

== Constructions ==
The Near Caves contain the underground Church of Saint Anthony, the Church of the Entry of the Mother of God into the Temple, and the Saint Varlaam Church. The caves also have a total of 79 surviving burials, among them being Nestor the Chronicler, the icon artists Alipy and Grigory, the doctor Agapit, the prince-ascetic Nikolai Sviatosha, the holy martyr Kuksha, as well as the remains of the epic hero Ilya Muromets. During the examination of the remains, it was established that Ilya Muromets had died from a stab wound. According to a legend, a force of angels transported him from the place where he had died to the Lavra caverns.

The Near Cave's main temple is the Church of the Elevation of the Cross (Khrestovozdvizhenska), which was constructed in the Ukrainian Baroque style from 1700-1704. The church's carved icons of 1769 have survived to this day. From the 19th century, the church served as a burial vault for the Kyiv Metropolitans. The old refectory of the church is connected to the brother's cells, a Neoclassical style building with a four-column portico dating from the 1830s.

At the foot of the hill stands the Near Cave's belltower, which was designed and constructed by architect Stepan Kovnir in 1760. Also, the headstones of a number of well-known Kyivans can be seen in front of the Khrestovozdvizhenska Church, namely, the headstone of the general-governor Aleksandr Bezak, which was designed by architect Mikhail Ikonnikov in 1860).

Beneath the Near Caverns, two old draw-wells were recently discovered. According to the legend one of them was dug by Saint Anthony and the other by his best-known disciple, Theodosius of Kyiv. Beside the draw-wells, a chapel was built, now known as the Church of the Life-Giving Spring, built in honour of the Icon of the Mother God.

== See also ==
- Category:Burials at the Near Caves
- Saint Anthony's Caves
