= Anthony and Theodosius =

11th-century saints

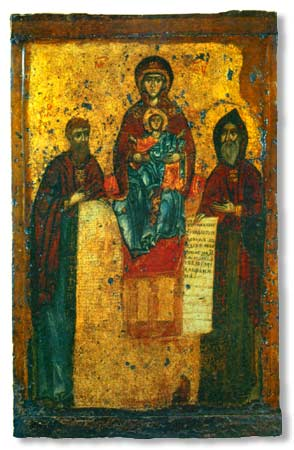
Sts. Anthony and Theodosius with the Theotokos Panachrantos, 11th-century icon from the Svensky Monastery.

Anthony and Theodosius were sainted founders of the Russian and Ukrainian monasticism. They established the Kiev Pechersk Monastery in the 11th century. See Saint Anthony of Kiev and Theodosius of Kiev for details.

In the Eastern Orthodox Church, their names are often listed together and they are commemorated together on September 2, while each has his own feast day as well (July 10 for St. Anthony and May 3 for St. Theodosius). They are also celebrated on the same days by Byzantine-rite Catholics of the Slavic churches. Pope John Paul II cited their influence in his apostolic letter Euntes in mundum.
