= Feast of the Conception of the Virgin Mary =

Liturgical holiday

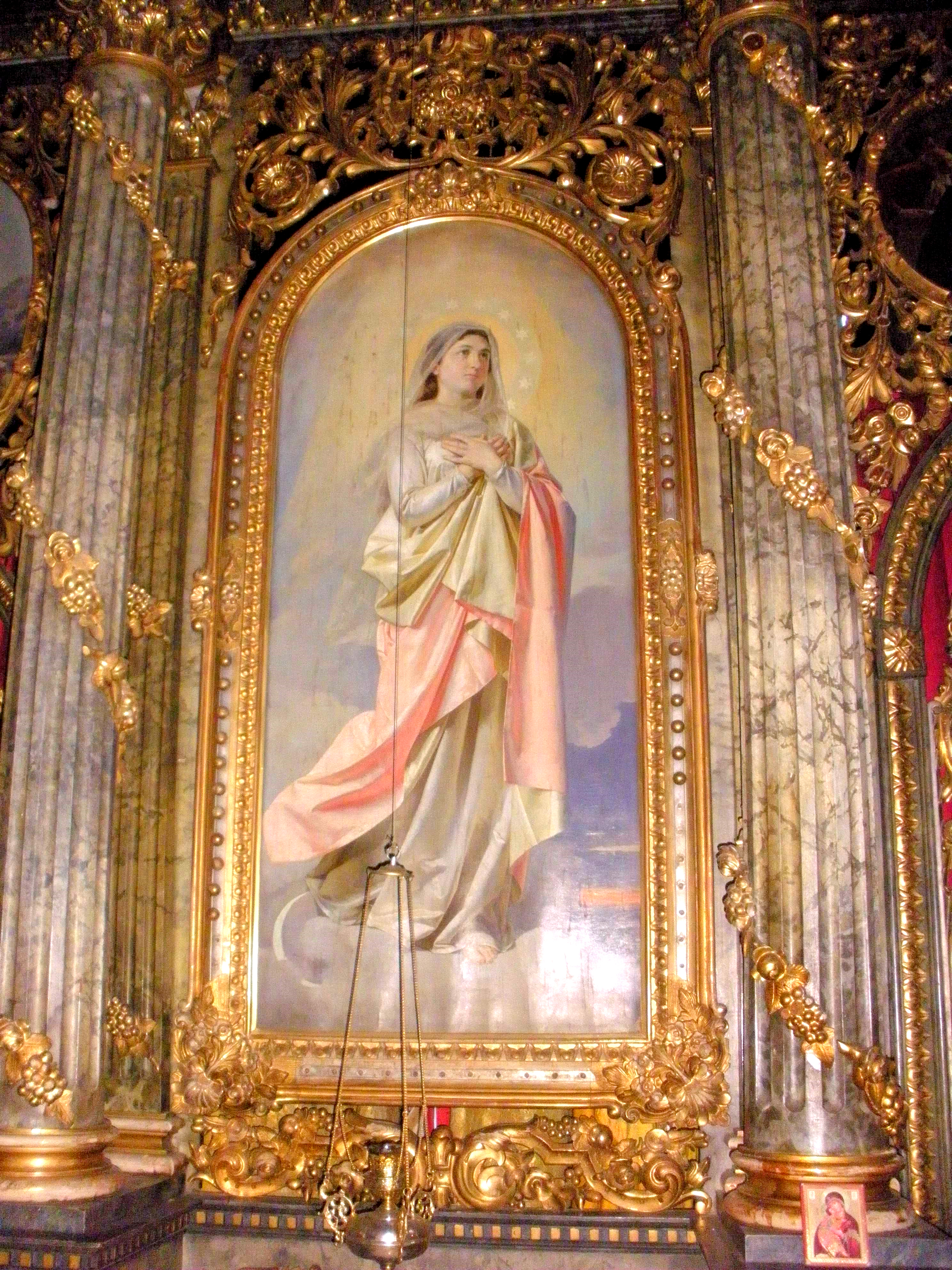
A painting of the Blessed Virgin Mary in an Orthodox church in Perlez, Serbia

The Feast of the Conception of the Virgin Mary is a liturgical holiday celebrated on December 9 by the Orthodox Church and a number of Eastern Catholic Churches. It is also the name given in the Catholic Tridentine calendar for 8 December. In the present General Roman Calendar, the feast is called the Solemnity of the Immaculate Conception of the Blessed Virgin Mary. In the Eastern Orthodox Church, the holy day was once called the Feast of Conception of Saint Anne.

== History ==
The Bible does not mention the birth and infancy of Mary, however, early Christians thought that, like John the Baptist, her birth, too, must have had something of the miraculous. This pious belief is reflected in the Protoevangelium of James, an apocryphal 2nd-century infancy gospel. A strong devotion to Saint Anne (and by extension to Joachim) developed in the East, and a number of churches were dedicated to them.

By the middle of the seventh century, a distinct feast day, the Conception of St. Anne (Maternity of Holy Anna) celebrating the conception of Mary by Saint Anne, was celebrated at the Monastery of Saint Sabas. The feast was subsequently entered in the liturgical calendar of the Byzantine Church. From ancient times this feast was especially venerated by pregnant women in Russia.

The feast eventually began to be observed in the West. Although the name changed to the Conception of Mary, it still focused on the miracle accorded to her parents. Herbert Thurston says that by the tenth century, the Feast of the Conception of Mary was noted in Irish liturgical calendars and listed for May 3. As it was thought that Mary was due no less honor than John the Baptist, it was believed that, like John, Mary must have been sanctified before birth. The feast was brought to Britain by Irish missionaries, and was celebrated there by the 1030s.

There developed a strong monastic cult of the Virgin Mary in England. The ecclesiastic and scholar Eadmer wrote De Conceptione sanctae Mariae, the first, and for two centuries the most valuable, Western exposition of the doctrine of the Immaculate Conception. The feast of the Conception of Mary had been celebrated at Canterbury since around 1030, and later at Canterbury and Exeter. After the Norman Conquest, with the reorganization of the Church calendar by Lanfranc, Archbishop of Canterbury, it had been suppressed. Eadmer's advocacy of a sinless Mary was probably motivated as much by the restoration of local Anglo-Saxon devotions at Canterbury as with the wider propagation of the doctrine.

Around the same time, Osbert de Clare, prior of St Peter's Abbey, Westminster attempted to introduce at Westminster, the Anglo-Saxon Feast of the Conception of Mary. A number of monks objected against this since it had not been sanctioned by Rome. Whereupon the matter was brought before the Council of London in 1129. The synod decided in favour of the feast, and Bishop Gilbert of London adopted it for his diocese. The feast was subsequently re-instated by Anselm, abbot of Bury St Edmunds. Other abbots soon followed. Thereafter the feast spread in England, but for a time retained its private character.

== Observance ==
The Eastern and Western Churches focus on different aspects of the feast. The East celebrates the miracle of God taking away the barrenness of Anna's womb, while the Western Church, emphasizes Mary's purity from all sin from her conception.

=== Orthodox ===
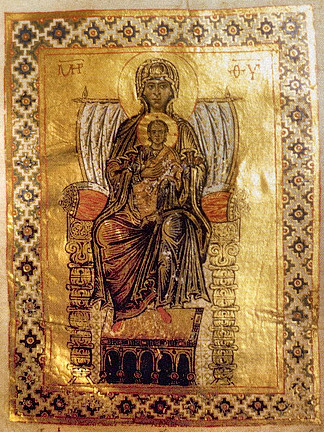
An 11th-century Eastern Orthodox icon of the Theotokos Panachranta, i.e., the "All Immaculate" Mary.

In the Eastern Orthodox Church, the faithful celebrate a liturgical feast on 9 December called the Conception (passive) of the Mother of God, which used to be more often called the Feast of the Conception (active) of Saint Anne. In the Greek Orthodox Church the feast is called "The Conception by St. Anne of the Most Holy Theotokos".

The Eastern feast is not ranked among the Great Feasts, but as a lesser-ranking feast. Unlike the Latin Church date of 8 December for the feast, the Eastern feast is not exactly nine months before the feast of the Nativity of the Theotokos (8 September), but a day later.

Mary is conceived by her parents as we are all conceived. But in her case it is a pure act of faith and love, in obedience to God's will, as an answer to prayer. In this sense her conception is truly "immaculate." And its fruit is woman who remains forever the most pure Virgin and Mother of God.
'Come, let us dance in the spirit!
Let us sing worthy praises to Christ!
Let us celebrate the joy of Joachim and Anna,
The conception of the Mother of our God,
For she is the fruit of the grace of God.'

=== Catholic ===
Pope Sixtus IV designated 8 December as the feast day of the Conception of Mary, and in 1476 issued the apostolic constitution Cum Praeexcelsa, establishing a Mass and Office for the feast. In 1568, in revising the Roman Breviary, Pope Pius V suppressed the office, substituting the word "nativity"; although the Franciscans were allowed to retain the old form.

In 1708 under the papal bull Commissi Nobis Divinitus, Pope Clement XI made it a Holy Day of Obligation. In 1854, in the apostolic constitution Ineffabilis Deus, Pope Pius IX defined the dogma of the Immaculate Conception of the Blessed Virgin Mary.

While the Eastern Orthodox Church recognizes the exceptional holiness of the Mother of God, whom it celebrates as immaculate (achrantos), "it did not follow the path of Roman Catholicism in moving towards a recognition of her Immaculate Conception".

Many Eastern Rite Catholic Churches celebrate the feast on December 9.

=== Anglican Communion ===
In the Church of England, the "Conception of the Blessed Virgin Mary" may be observed as a Lesser Festival on 8 December. The Anglican Breviary uses the term "spotless" rather than "immaculate" to distinguish an acceptable pious belief from Catholic dogma. The situation in other constituent churches of the Anglican Communion is similar.

Many Anglo-Catholic parishes observe the feast using the traditional Roman Catholic title, the "Immaculate Conception of the Blessed Virgin Mary".

== See also ==
- The Blessed Virgin Mary
- Immaculate Conception
- Original Sin
- Theotokos Panachranta
