= Svensky Monastery =

Coordinates: 53°12′20″N 34°19′41″E

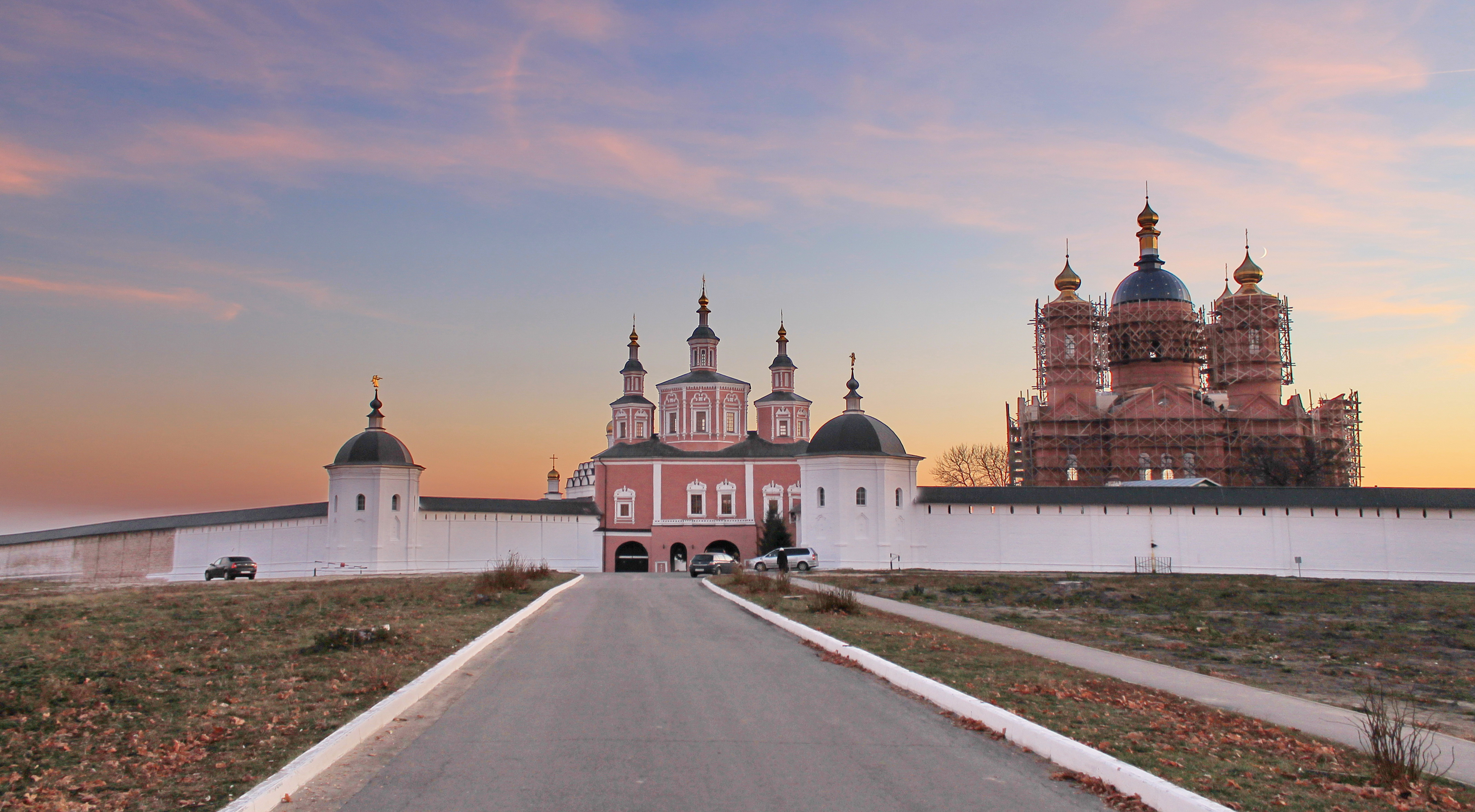
The monastery in 2014.

Svensky Monastery (Russian: Свенский монастырь) is a Russian Orthodox monastery located at the confluence of the Desna and Sven Rivers, three miles from Bryansk, Russia. The monastery was originally known as Svinsky, after the Svin River, but the spelling was subsequently changed to Svensky, because "svinsky" also means "of the swine" in Russian.

Church legends attribute the monastery's foundation to Prince Roman of Bryansk, who was reportedly buried there. As the legend has it, the monastery was founded to mark the place where a miraculous icon of the Theotokos appeared to Roman, the second son of St. Mikhail of Chernigov, and cured him of blindness. A tree where it was found, was chopped down to be used for icon painting.

The miraculous icon represents the Theotokos Panachrantos with SS. Anthony and Theodosius. It is popularly attributed to the most celebrated icon-painter of Kievan Rus, St. Alypius from the Kiev Pechersk Monastery. Nikodim Kondakov supposed that the icon was modeled on a mosaic from the central conch of the Assumption Cathedral in the Pechersk Monastery.

In the 16th century, the monastery was repeatedly sacked by the Crimean Tatars. After one such raid, Ivan the Terrible donated funds sufficient to build a cathedral of five domes, a refectory church, and a belltower. The cathedral doors of rare craftsmanship were endowed by Prince Ivan Mstislavsky. The church of SS. Anthony and Theodosius was started on 19 May 1566; its vaults suffered a collapse a year later but were restored.

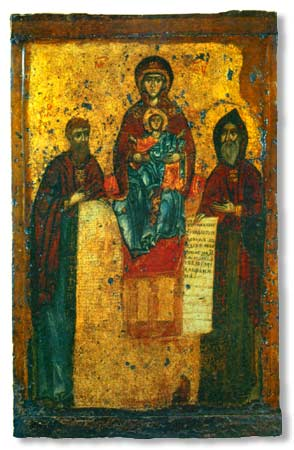
SS. Anthony and Theodosius with the Theotokos Panachrantos, an 11th-century icon from the Svensky Monastery.

After Russia gained the Left-bank Ukraine by the Treaty of Andrusovo, the liveliest fair in the region was held annually underneath the walls of the Svensky Monastery. Its ties with the Kiev Pechersk Lavra were so close that in 1682 the Svensky Monastery was transformed into a branch of the lavra, its name changed from Svensky to New Pechersk monastery.

During this period of Ukrainian domination, Cossack Baroque was liberally applied to its buildings. The Presentation Church, rising in three towers above the main entrance to the abbey, was erected in the late 1680s in the simplified Ukrainian Baroque style. The main cathedral was rebuilt in the Baroque style in 1715. The ancient clocktower was built up to the height of 42 meters. The Saviour Church over the fair gates was constructed in five levels, ringed by a gallery, in 1742. The walls of the monastery were erected between 1749 and 1769.

On 30 July 1749 work started on the new cathedral, which was to be modeled on the New Cathedral of the Donskoi Monastery in Moscow. It is believed that its design was commissioned from Ivan Fyodorovich Michurin, who had supervised construction of St Andrew's Church of Kiev. The cathedral of the Svensky Monastery was reminiscent of another structure ascribed to Michurin — St. Clement's Church in Zamoskvorechye. A seven-tier Baroque iconostasis from the old cathedral was carefully preserved and assembled in the new structure before it was consecrated in 1758.

There was no new construction in the monastery after that. In the 19th century, the cloister declined, especially after the fair had been moved to Bryansk in 1864. A garden of cedars, chestnuts, and cherry-trees was planted to mark its historical location. The Bolsheviks closed the monastery in 1926. Its valuables were expropriated, while the miraculous icon of the Theotokos was given to the Tretyakov Gallery. Michurin's cathedral was blown up; the Church of SS. Anthony and Theodosius (the oldest in the complex) reduced to rubble; the house where Peter the Great stayed before the Battle of Poltava torn down. It was not until the late 1980s that conservation works on the remaining structures started. The monks were readmitted into the monastery in 1992.
