= Theodosius of Kiev =

Christian saint (1009–1074)

Saint Theodosius of Kiev
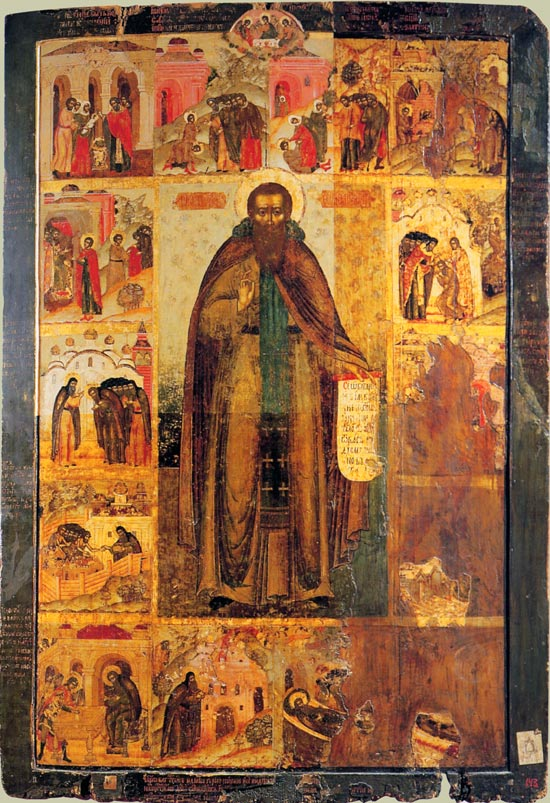
- Icon of St. Theodosius

Venerable Father
- Born: 1009; Vasylkiv
- Died: 3 May 1074 (aged 64–65); Kiev
- Venerated in: Eastern Orthodox Church; Roman Catholic Church
- Feast: 3 May (Repose); 14 August (Translation of relics)
- Attributes: Clothed as an Eastern Orthodox monk, sometimes with an hegumen's paterissa (crozier)

Theodosius of Kiev or Theodosius of the Caves (Russian: Феодосий Печерский, romanized: Feodosy Pechersky; Ukrainian: Феодосій Печерський, romanized: Feodosiy Pechers'kyy) was an 11th-century saint who brought cenobitic monasticism to Kievan Rus' and, together with Anthony of Kiev, founded the Kiev Caves Lavra (Monastery of the Caves). A hagiography of Theodosius was written in the twelfth century by Nestor the Chronicler.

Theodosius' greatest achievement has been the introducing of the monastic rule of Theodore the Studite in the Monastery of the Caves whence it spread to all the monasteries of the Ukrainian and Russian Orthodox Church. According to the Primary Chronicle:

... the monastery was completed during the abbacy of Barlaam ... When Barlaam had departed the brethren ... visited the aged Anthony [founder of the Monastery of the Caves, who was now living in deep seclusion] with the request that he should designate a new abbot for them. He inquired whom they desired. They replied that they required only the one designated by God and by his [Anthony's] own selection. Then he inquired of them: "Who among you is more obedient, more modest, and more mild than Theodosius? Let him be your abbot." The brethren rejoiced ... and thus they appointed Theodosius to be their abbot.

When Theodosius took over in the monastery, he began to practice abstinence, fasting, and tearful prayer. ... He also interested himself in searching out monastic rules. There was in Kiev at the time a monk from the Studion Monastery named Michael, who had come from Greece. ... Theodosius inquired of him the practices of the Studite monks. He obtained their rule from him, copied it out, and established it in his own monastery to govern the chanting of monastic hymns, in making reverences, reading of the lessons, behavior in church, the whole ritual, conduct at the table, proper food for special days, and to regulate all else according to prescription.

After obtaining all this information, Theodosius thus transmitted it to his monastery, and from the latter all others adopted the same instruction. Whereas the Monastery of the Caves is honored among the oldest of them all.

According to the Life of Theodosius by Nestor the Chronicler:

He was respected, not because of fine clothes or rich estates, but for his radiant life and purity of spirit, and for his teachings, fired with the inspiration of the Holy Ghost. To him the goatskin and the hair-shirt were more precious than a king’s purple robe, and he was proud to wear them.

Theodosius has been glorified (canonized) as a saint by the Russian Orthodox Church. His main feast day is 3 May, the date of his repose. His relics were discovered by Nestor the Chronicler on 14 August 1091, and were found to be incorrupt. The relics were transferred to the main catholicon (cathedral) of the monastery, and a second annual feast day was established in commemoration of this event.

== See also ==
- Svensky Monastery
