= Anthony of Kiev =

Christian monk and Saint

Saint Anthony of Kiev
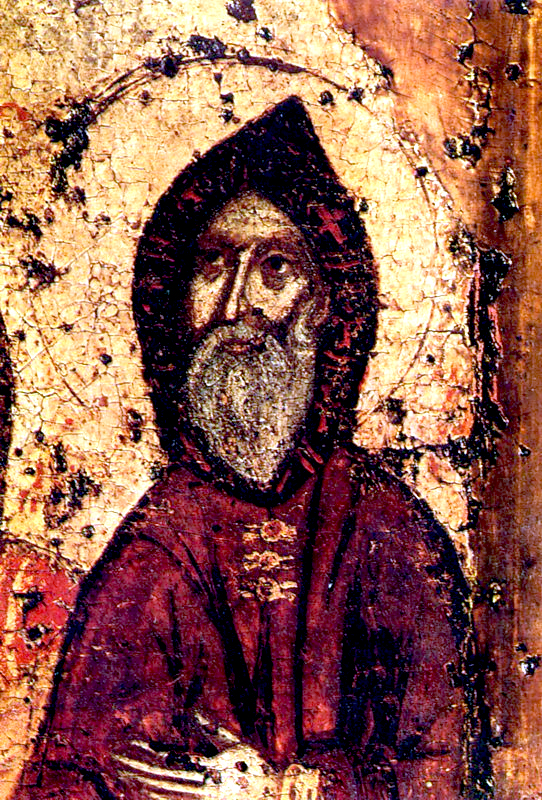
- Fragment of an icon, 1288

Venerable Father
- Born: c. 983; Liubech
- Died: c. 1073; Kiev
- Venerated in: Eastern Orthodox Church; Roman Catholic Church
- Major shrine: Svensky Monastery
- Feast: 10/23 July (Eastern Orthodox and Eastern Catholic), 7 May (Roman Catholic)
- Attributes: Clothed as a monk in monastic habit, sometimes with an abbot's paterissa (crozier)

Anthony of Kiev, also called Anthony of the Caves (Russian: Антоний Печерский, Ukrainian: Антоній Печерський; c. 983 – 1073), was a monk and the founder of the monastic tradition in Kievan Rus'. Together with Theodosius of Kiev, he co-founded the Kiev Pechersk Lavra (Kiev Monastery of the Caves).

== Early life ==
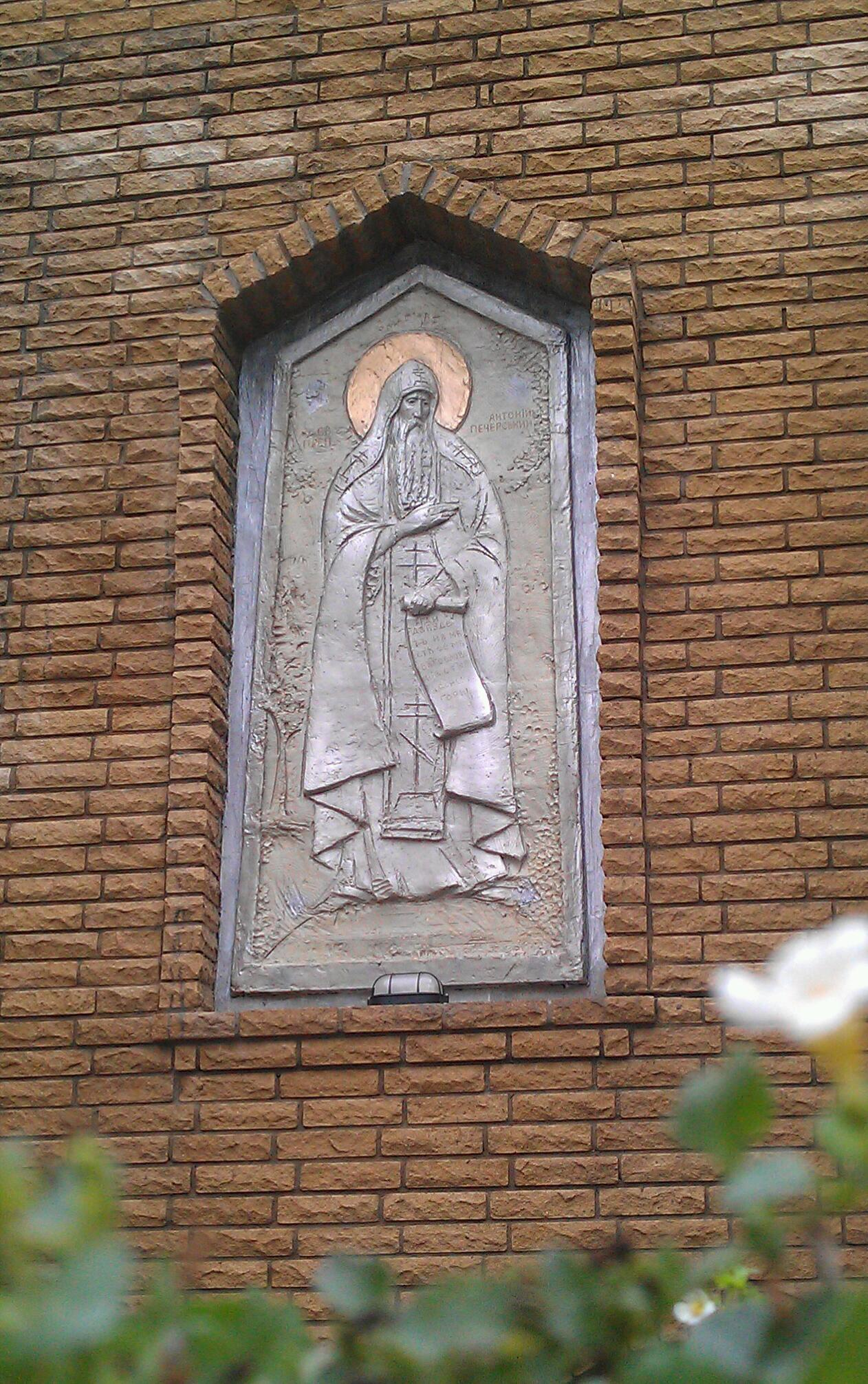
Anthony sculpture in Lyubech by Giennadij Jerszow

He was born in Liubech (present-day Ukraine) in Chernigov Principality and was baptized with the name "Antipas". He was drawn to the spiritual life from an early age and left for the Greek Orthodox Esphigmenou Monastery on Mount Athos to live as a hermit. He lived in a secluded cave there overlooking the sea, which is open to visitors today. In circa 1011, the abbot gave Anthony the job of expanding monasticism in his native Kiev (present-day Kyiv, Ukraine), which had only recently begun its conversion to Christianity.

== Return to Kiev ==
Anthony returned to Kiev, and found several monasteries established on the order of local princes, but these were not as austere as Anthony was used to from his time on Mount Athos. He instead chose to live in a small cave which had been dug by the presbyter Hilarion.

In 1015, his peaceful austerity was interrupted by the death of Vladimir the Great, and the subsequent fratricidal war for the throne between Vladimir's sons Yaroslav and Sviatopolk, and Anthony returned to Mount Athos. When the conflict ended, the abbot sent Anthony back to Kiev, prophesying that many monks would join him on his return.

== Establishment of Kiev Pechersk Lavra ==
Anthony became well known in the area for his strict asceticism. He ate rye bread every other day and drank only a little water. His fame soon spread beyond Kiev, and several people began to ask for his spiritual guidance or blessing. Soon, some people even offered to join him. Eventually, Anthony accepted the company of a few of them. The first was a priest named Nikon. The second was Theodosius of Kiev.

The new monastery enjoyed royal favor almost from the beginning, although there were occasional problems. When Iziaslav I of Kiev demanded that the son of a wealthy boyar and one of his own retainers be told to leave the monastery, Nikon said he could not take soldiers away from the King of Heaven. This did nothing to placate Iziaslav's anger, and Anthony decided that it might be expedient for him to leave. Anthony returned after Iziaslav's wife requested his return.

Shortly thereafter Anthony had gained twelve disciples. They dug a large cave and built a church and cells for the monks within it, thus laying the foundation of what was to become the renowned Kiev Caves Lavra. Anthony appointed Barlaam of Kiev as first abbot. Devoted to the model of the solitary hermit set by his namesake Anthony the Great, Anthony then left his cave for a nearby mountain so he could continue to live the solitary life. There he dug another cave for himself and lived in seclusion there. This cave became the first of what would later be known as the Far Caves.

In time, Barlaam, was called by Iziaslav to head a new monastery, St. Demetrios, which had been built at the gates of the city. The monks requested Anthony to name a replacement, and he named Theodosius.

As the number of monks grew and crowding became a problem, Anthony requested that Iziaslav give them the hill in which the caves were located. He did so, and the monks built a wooden church in honour of the Dormition of the Theotokos, and some cells there, encircling the area with a wooden fence. Theodosius continued to consult Anthony in the guidance of the community and, as the monastery grew, so did Anthony's reputation.

== Exile and return ==
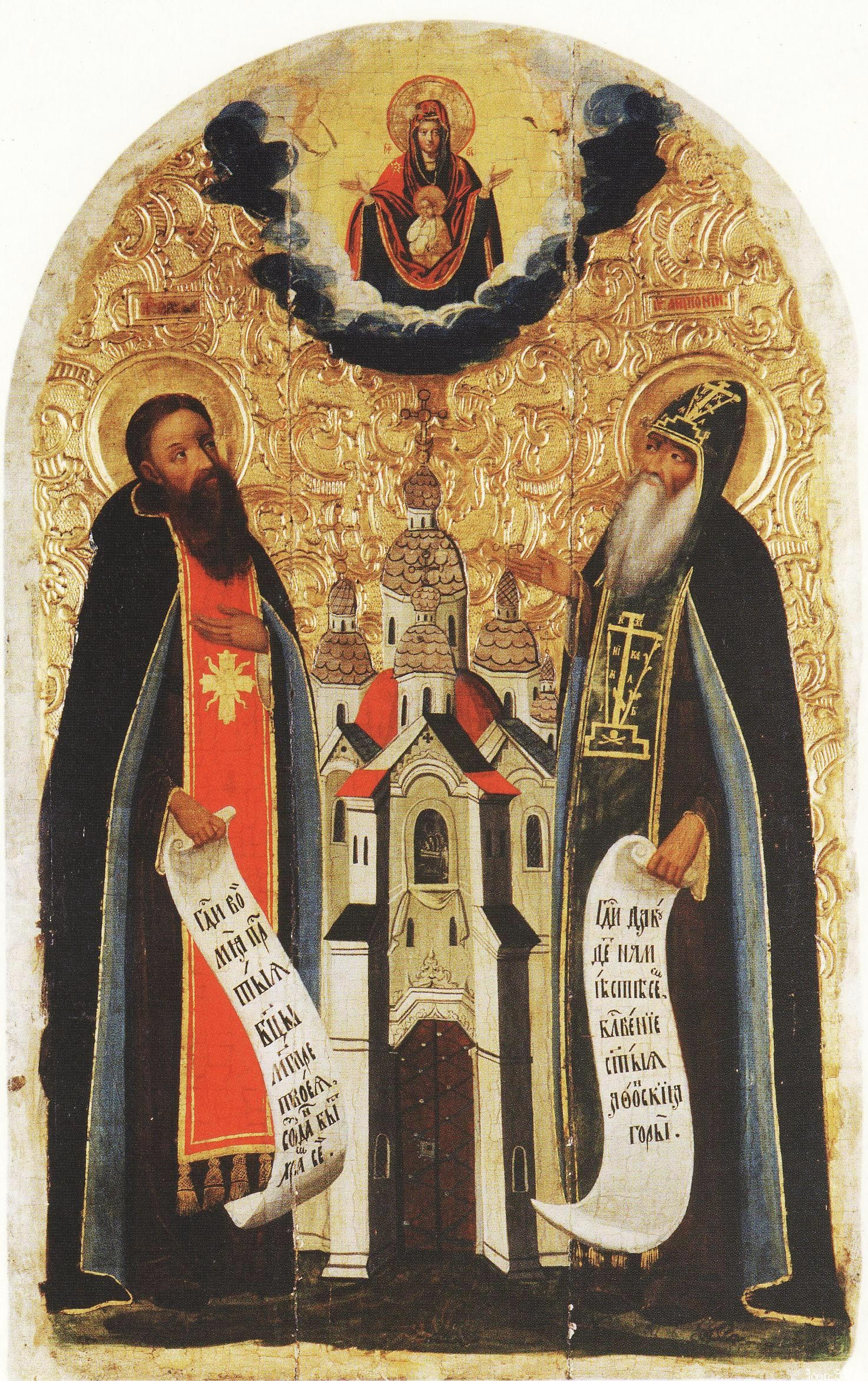
Icon depicting Saints Anthony of Kiev and Theodosius of Kiev

When Iziaslav and his brothers were facing a popular uprising involving the Cumans, they came to Anthony for his blessing. They did not get it. Anthony foretold that because of their sins they would be defeated, and that the brothers would be buried in a church they would build. Shortly thereafter Iziaslav left because of the rebellion. He suspected Anthony of sympathizing with the opposition and arranged to banish Anthony upon his return. Before he could do so, Iziaslav's brother, Sviatoslav, arranged for Anthony to be secretly taken to Chernigov. Anthony dug himself a cave there. The Eletsky Monastery there is said by some to be built on the site of Anthony's cave. Eventually Iziaslav was again reconciled to Anthony and asked that he return to Kiev.

On his return, Anthony and Theodosius decided to build a larger stone church to accommodate the ever-increasing number of monks. Anthony himself did not live to see the church completed. He died in 1073 at the age of ninety, shortly after blessing the foundation of the new church. Shortly before his death he called the monks together and consoled them about his coming death. He also asked them that his remains be hidden away forever. The monks carried out his request. He was reportedly buried in his cave, but no relics have ever been found. Many however have subsequently come to the cave to pray and many of them have reported being healed there.

== Veneration ==
St. Anthony is venerated as a saint and the founder of monasticism in Kievan Rus'. His feast day falls on 10 July. Since the Russian Orthodox Church as well as Ukrainian Orthodox Church (Moscow Patriarchate) follow the Julian Calendar, the day on which his feast is celebrated is currently 23 July on the modern Gregorian Calendar. Saint Anthony is also venerated by Greek Catholics. Additionally, he is listed in the Martyrologium Romanum of the Roman Catholic Church with a feast day of 7 May.

His relics have never been found.

== See also ==
- Svensky Monastery
- Near Caves (Pechersk Lavra)

== Sources ==
- Attwater, Donald; John, Catherine Rachel (1993). The Penguin Dictionary of Saints (3rd ed.). New York: Penguin Books. ISBN 0-14-051312-4.
