= St Andrew's Church, Kyiv =

- Андріївська церква
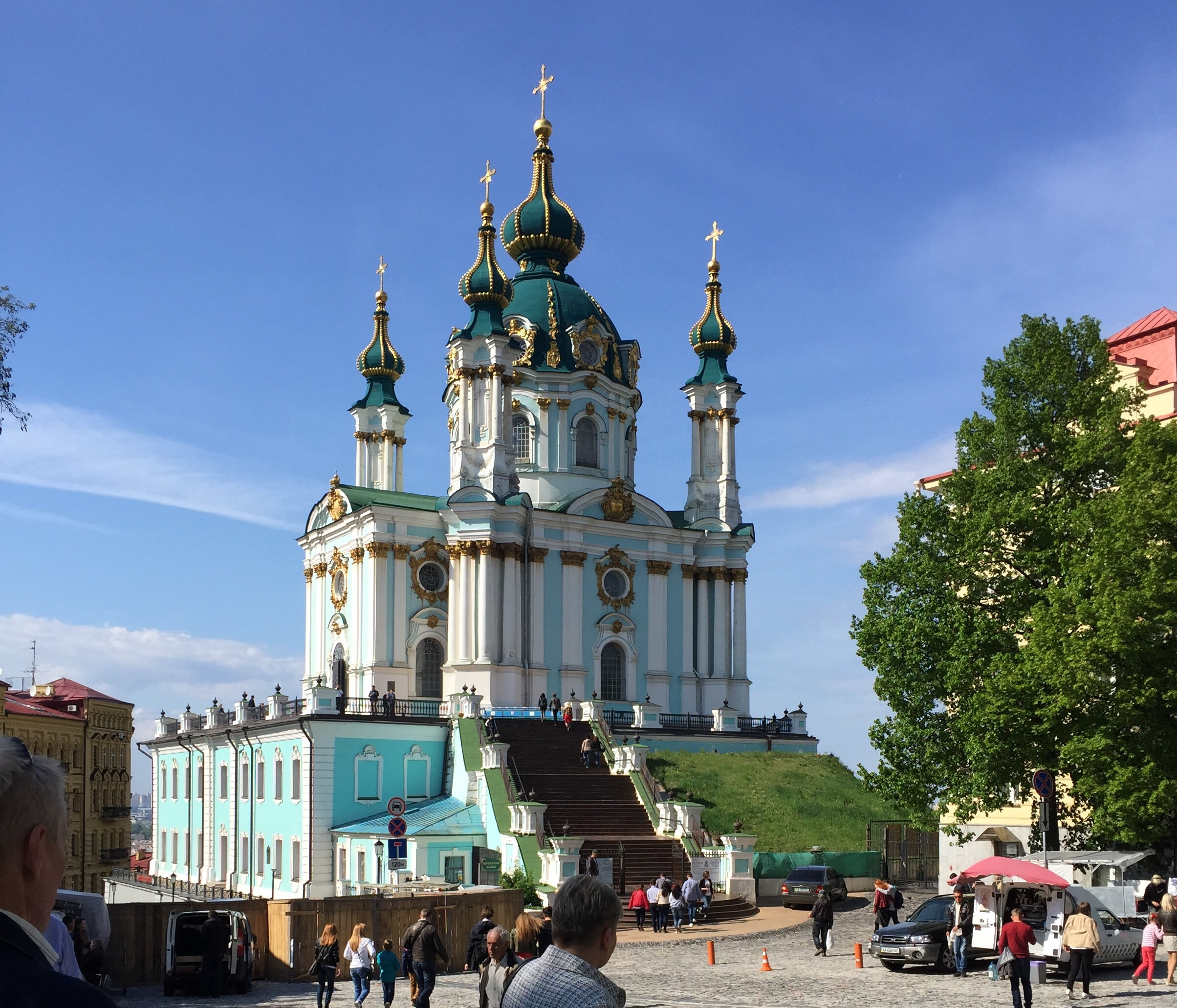
- St Andrew's Church, Kyiv
- 50°27′32″N 30°31′5″E
- Location: Kyiv, Ukraine
- Denomination: Eastern Orthodox
- Previous denomination: Ukrainian Autocephalous Orthodox Church
- Churchmanship: Patriarchate of Constantinople (Note: St Andrew's Church has been transferred to the Ecumenical Patriarchate by the Ukrainian parliament before the Unification council of the Eastern Orthodox churches of Ukraine.)

History
- Dedication: Andrew the Apostle

Architecture
- Architect(s): Bartolomeo Rastrelli, Ivan Michurin
- Style: Ukrainian Baroque
- Completed: 1767

Specifications
- Length: 31.7 m (104 ft)
- Width: 20.4 m (67 ft)
- Height: 50 m (160 ft)

Immovable Monument of National Significance of Ukraine
- Reference no.: 260071-Н

St Andrew's Church (Ukrainian: Андріївська церква, Andriivska tserkva) is a historic Orthodox church in Kyiv, Ukraine. It was built between 1747 and 1754 to a design by the Italian architect Bartolomeo Rastrelli. It is a rare example of Ukrainian Baroque.

St Andrew's Church is situated on a steep hill. The hill is where Andrew the Apostle is believed to have foretold that Kyiv would become the cradle of Christianity in the Slavic lands and prophesied that the area would one day become a great city. A succession of churches have existed on or near the site, the last before the construction of the current building being a wooden church that was pulled down in 1726.

The church is owned by the Ukrainian government. In 1968, it was designated as a museum, part of the National Sanctuary "Sophia of Kyiv" as a landmark of cultural heritage. From 2008 to 2018, the Ukrainian Autocephalous Orthodox Church was allowed to use it as a mother church. In October 2018, in anticipation of the unification council of the Eastern Orthodox churches of Ukraine, the Ukrainian state decided instead to allow its direct use by the Ecumenical Patriarchate of Constantinople.

At the beginning of the 21st century the building faced problems due to its unstable foundation and it underwent major renovation at the end of the 2010s.

== Early churches on the site ==
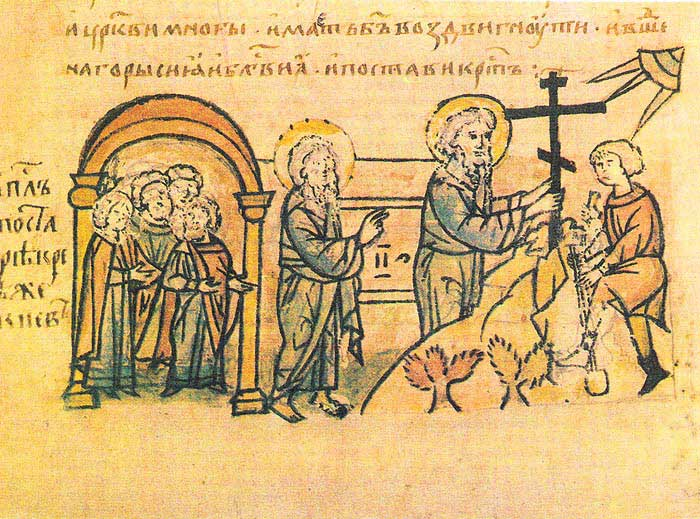
Saint Andrew's prophecy of Kyiv depicted in the Radziwiłł Chronicle

Andrew the Apostle is recognized as the Apostle of Rus′. According to the early medieval chronicle The Tale of Bygone Years, he came to the slopes of the Dnipro River and erected a cross at the current location of the church. He prophesied that the sparsely-inhabited area would one day become a great city.

In 1086, Vsevolod I of Kyiv constructed a church within a monastery dedicated to Saint Andrew. It was replaced by a succession of wooden churches.

== Early history ==
The construction of a new church was conceived when Elizabeth of Russia decided to construct a summer residence for herself in Kyiv that would include a place of worship nearby. The palace was to be located in the Pechersk neighborhood, while the church was to be on the Andriyivska Hill. On 9 September 1744 the Empress laid the first three founding stones herself The consecration was performed by Metropolitan of Kyiv Raphael Zaborovsky.

The Petersburg Building Chancellery first hired the German architect Gottfried Johann Schädel and the engineer Daniel de Bosquet to draft out the plans for the church, but the plans were rejected in 1745. Schädel was replaced by head architect of the imperial court, Bartolomeo Rastrelli, who worked out a plan which was closely based on a church of a Saint Petersburg institute.

The construction itself was conducted by a team of Russian and foreign masters under the direction of architect Ivan Michurin, who was previously successful in replacing the older Church of the Resurrection, on the Women's Market Square (Babiy torzhok) in Moscow. Michurin was responsible for carrying out all of the engineering and geological researches of the site and found out that a hard subsoil ground lies at a depth of 13–14 meters and above — made grounds penetrated by subterranean waters. With this information, Michurin developed the construction of a stone foundation and connected it with the two-storied building of the Priest's apartments, planned by Rastrelli.

I. Vlasiev and the Governor-General of Kiev, Mikhail Ivanovich Leontyev, were placed in charge of hiring masons, carpenters, and carvers from territories now located in Belarus, Lithuania, and Ukraine. White and red bricks for the church were made at the brick fields of the Sophia, Pechersk, and Cyril cloisters. The foundation stone was delivered by the Kyiv garrison soldiers from the neighboring towns of Rzhyshchiv and Bucha. The wood came from the nearby Pushcha-Vodytsia forests. Also, infantry regiments from Kyiv, Chernihiv, Starodub, and Poltava were involved in the church's construction. Apart from workers from the neighbouring villages, the Kyiv Pechersk Lavra sent 50 of its best masons to work on the church.

Both the external and internal decoration on the church was carried out at the same time. Cast iron floor slabs were delivered from Moscow. Also, forms were made for the church's windows, doors, walls, and for space under the cupola. The planned iconostasis, designed by Rastrelli, was also added. The wood for the iconostasis, altar canopy, pulpit, and tsar's place were carved in Saint Petersburg in order to conserve time. The iconostasis' icons were carried out by Petersburg artists. For gilding, 1,028 slabs of gold were used in the interior.

The exterior work was finished in 1754, but it was not until 1767 that the interior work and decorations were completed. Alexei Antropov and Ivan Vishnyakov painted the church's icons, and the frescoes were done by Ukrainian masters I. Romenskyi and I. Chaikovskyi. A planned ramp that was to be installed to provide access to the church, was later changed to a wooden staircase due to the steepness of the hill. The wooden ramp was later (in 1844) changed to a cast iron one.

As the Empress died before the construction ended and her successors took no interest in the church, and the church was left without any funding. For some time, the church existed off of private and voluntary funds, from people such as Andrey Muravyov, who lived in a house close by.

== Later restoration work ==
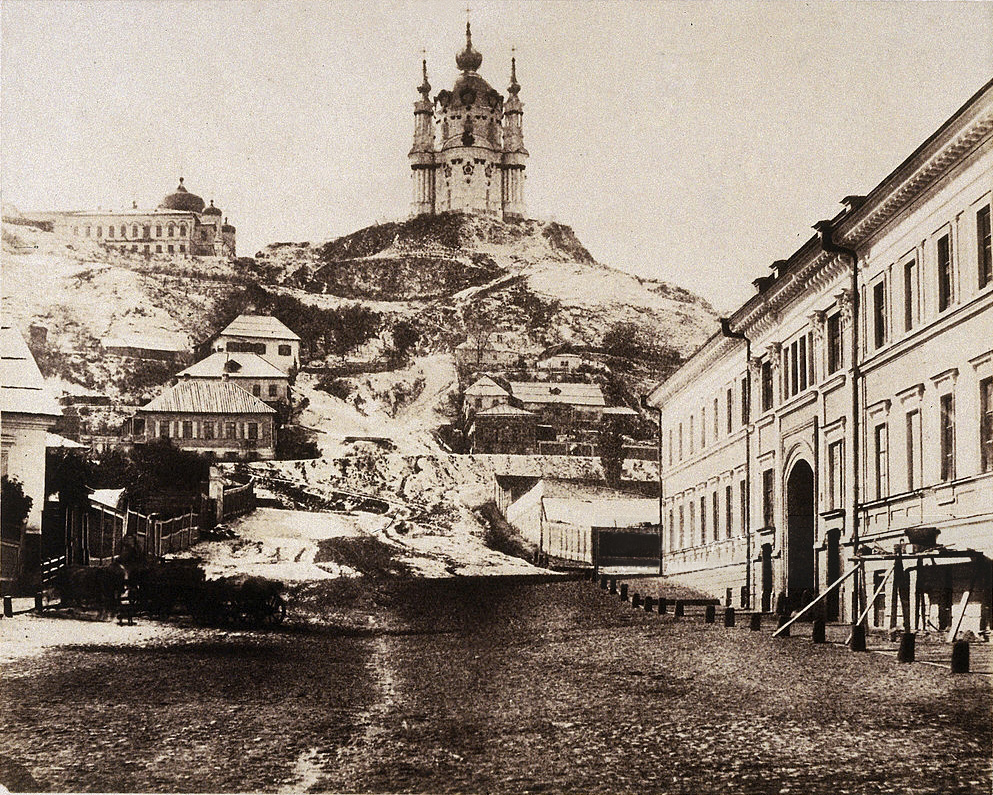
An 1852 photograph of St Andrew's Church

In 1815, a storm tore off the church's cupolas, which resulted in the need for a full restoration. The following year, the Moscow architect Andrey Melensky made plans of the building's façade and sent them for consideration to Saint Petersburg. In 1825–1828, the church was restored, based on Melensky's plans. The red mission tiles was replaced by metal ones, which caused the form of the cupolas to be altered and some of the decor to be lost.

From 1917 to 1953, work was done on the foundations of the church and the façade, interior, and decor was renovated. St Andrew's remained open for regular worship until 1932, when it was closed by the authorities.

During the early 1960s, Rastrelli's original plans of the Baroque cupolas were discovered in Vienna. In 1970, the St. Sophia Museum requested photocopies of the originals from the Albertina Museum in Vienna. A team led by the architect V. Korneyeva used Rastrelli's drawings to restore the church's domes in 1978. In 1987, the church was included into the National Conservation area "Saint Sophia of Kyiv."

In 2015 St Andrew's was closed in order for major restoration work to take place. the During the restoration, the interior was redecorated, and icons and the iconostasis were repaired. In addition, repairmen replaced engineering networks, implemented new lighting, heating, and air supply systems, and replaced the windows.

== Other uses during the 20th century ==
In 1935, the St. Andrew's Church was included into the Historical and Cultural Conservation "All-Ukraine Museum Area." For some time after 1939, Saint Sophia Anti-religious Museum was located within the premises of the church. During World War II, regular church services were restored, only to be closed down again in 1961. Since then, the church's stylobate was rented to different organizations up until 1992, when the stylobate was occupied by the Seminary of the Ukrainian Orthodox Church of the Kyivan Patriarchate. On January 10, 1968, the church was included into the State Architectural and Historical Conservation area "Saint Sophia Museum." On September 10 of the same year, the church was opened as a historical and architectural museum.

== Return to use as a church ==
In 2008, the church was handed over to the Ukrainian Autocephalous Orthodox Church. In October 2018, the church was by law gifted to the Ecumenical Patriarchate of Constantinople as a stauropegion. On 21 August 2021, the Ecumenical Patriarch Bartholomew, on a visit to Ukraine by the invitation of Ukrainian president Volodymyr Zelenskyy, presided at the Vespers in the Stavropegion.

== Architecture and preservation ==
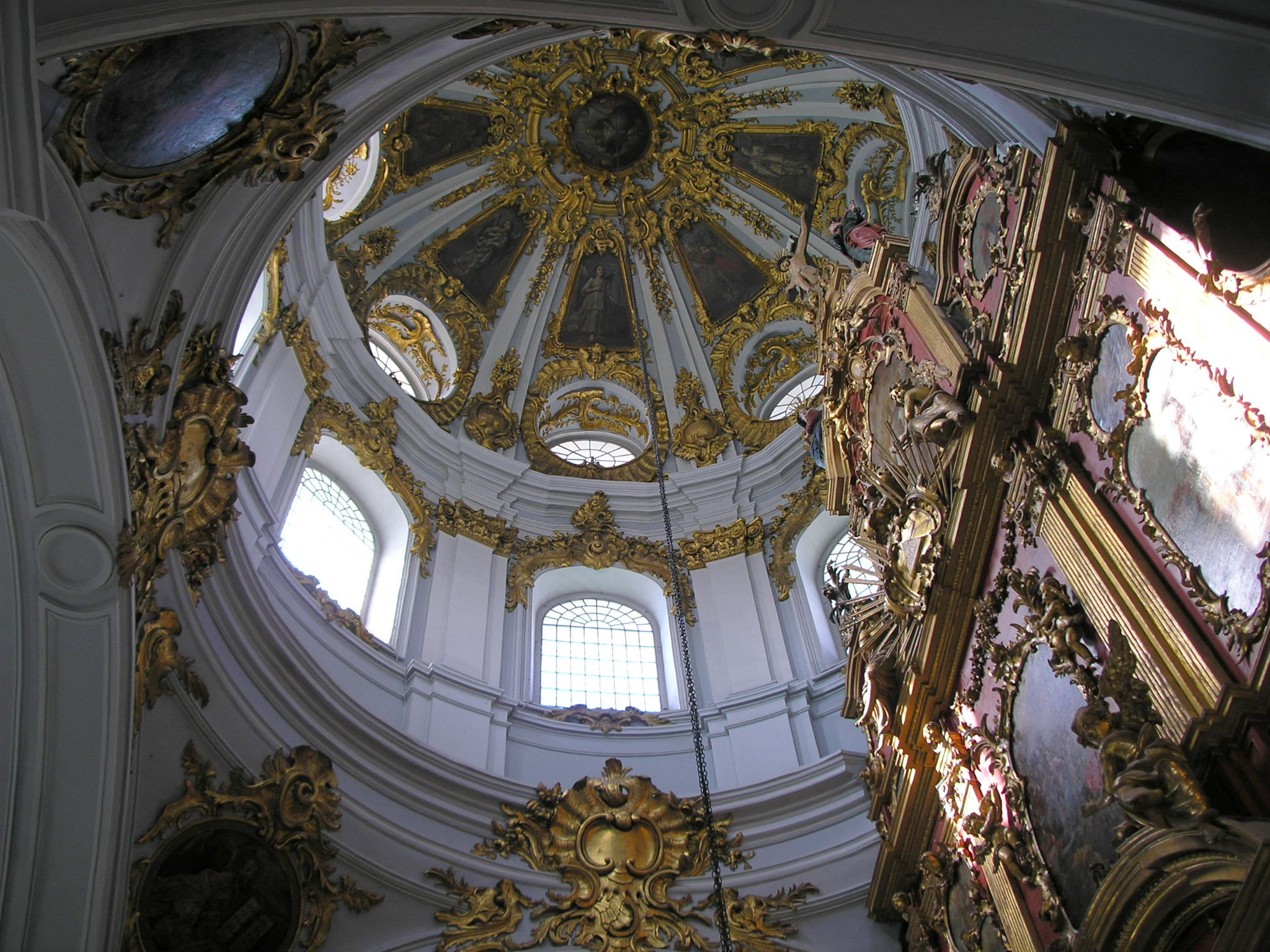
View of the central dome with the iconostasis.

The church was constructed on a 15-metre (49 ft) foundation-stylobate, which from the eastern side faces downhill and from the western—has a two-story construction. The church consists of a single dome and five small decorative spires. From the outside façade, Corinthian columns decorate the church, accompanied by additional decorations. The windows and doors of the church are decorated with ornamental details.

As the church sits atop a hill, foundation problems have been one of the main concerns of preservationists. More recently, the foundation below the church has started to shift, causing some concerns that the church's foundation might collapse. Cracks have already appeared in the church's foundation, resulting with the fact that a special committee was set up by the Minister of Emergency Situations Nestor Shufrich.

According to the Ministry of Emergency Situations, they will conduct research on the building's foundation and its construction with the help of Ministry of Construction, Kyiv City Administration, and the division of the Ministry of Emergency Situations in Kyiv City.

== Sources ==
- Kudrytskyi, A. (1981). "Київ". Ukrainian Soviet Encyclopedia. Kyiv, Ukraine. ISBN 978-966-8668-22-7.
- Lytvynchuk, Janna (2006). St. Andrew's Church, Kyiv. Kyiv, Ukraine: Anateya. ISBN 978-966-8668-22-7.
- Malikenaite, Ruta (2003). Touring the Crimea (in Russian). Kyiv, Ukraine: Baltija Dryk. ISBN 978-966-96041-9-4.
- Mironenko, Aleksandr (1977). St. Andrew's Church (in Russian, Polish, and Czech). Kyiv, Ukraine: Mystetstvo.
- White, Monica (2013). Military Saints in Byzantium and Rus, 900-1200. Cambridge, UK: Cambridge University Press. ISBN 9780521195645.
- Zharikov, N. L. (1983–1986). "Genoezskaya Krepost XIV–XV cc.". Monuments of Urban Development and Architecture in the Ukrainian SSR (in Russian). Kyiv, Ukraine: Budivel'nyk. LCCN 84179019.
