= Háukon (given name) =

Male given name

The name Háukon is of Old Norse and originates from Scandinavia. The term Scandinavia covers the three kingdoms of Denmark, Norway, and Sweden. Other synonym names are Hákon, Haakon, Hakon, Haukur, Haukr. Name is also related to Danish given name Hagen.

== Etymology ==
Of debated meaning; The name stems from name HaukR (“one who grips, catches”) meaning "Hawk", from Proto-Germanic *habukaz, derived from Proto-Indo-European *keh₂p- (“seize”). It is also believed it refers to "high son" from há "high" and konr "son, descendant".

Ancient Germanic

- Haƀuka- = 'hawk', 'falcon'; 'raven' (poet.); 'young and brave man'
- Habukōn = 'to be like a hawk'

Old Norse

- Haukr = 'hawk'
- Haukr = 'hawk', 'falcon'; 'raven' (poet.); 'young and brave man'

Old Saxon

- Haƀuc = 'hawk', 'falcon'; 'raven' (poet.); 'young and brave man'

Old High German

- Habuh = 'hawk', 'falcon'; 'raven' (poet.); 'young and brave man'

Old Frisian

- Havek = 'hawk', 'falcon'; 'raven' (poet.); 'young and brave man'

Old English

- Heafoc = 'hawk'hawk', 'falcon'; 'raven' (poet.); 'young and brave man'
- Hafoc = 'hawk', 'falcon'; 'raven' (poet.); 'young and brave man'

== Noun ==
Hauk m(definite singular Hauken.

Kan du se háukene på himmelen? Can you see the hawks in the sky?

== Namesakes ==
- Hakon Jarl runestones Swedish runestones from the time of Canute the Great king of Denmark, England and Norway; together often referred to as the North Sea Empire.
- Saga of Hákon góði ("the Good"). Also known as Haakon I of Norway, king of Norway from 934 to 961. Son of Harald Fairhair
- Saga of Hákon Herdebrei ("the Broadshouldered"). Also known as Haakon II of Norway, King of Norway from 1157 until 1162. The saga originates in Heimskringla a collection of sagas about Swedish and Norwegian kings.
- Hákonarmál Old Norse: 'The Song of Hákon'
- Hákonardrápa
- Hauksbok
- Hákon Sigurdsson (c. 937–995), also known as Earl Haakon, effective ruler of Norway from about 975 to 995
- Hákon_Ericsson (died c. 1029–1030), grandson of Haakon Sigurdsson, ruler of the Kingdom of the Isles from 1016 until his death, and vassal ruler of Norway under Cnut the Great from 1028
- Hákon Magnusson of Norway (1068–1095), partially recognised as king from 1093 to 1095
- Hákon III of Norway (1182–1204), known as Haakon Sverreson
- Hákon IV of Norway (1204–1263), known as Haakon the Old
- Óspakr-Hákon (died 1230), who took the regnal name Hákon when briefly appointed King of the Isles by Haakon IV in 1230
- Hákon V of Norway (1270–1319), known as Haakon V Magnusson
- Hákon VI of Norway (1343–1380), known as Haakon VI Magnusson. King of Norway from 1343 until his death and King of Sweden between 1362 and 1364
- Hákon VII of Norway (1872–1957), born Prince Carl of Denmark
- Haakon, Crown Prince of Norway, the current heir to the Norwegian throne, who is expected to succeed as Haakon VIII
