= Hakan =

- Gender: Masculine

Origin
- Meaning: 'Supreme Ruler', 'Great King', 'Emperor'
- Region of origin: Turkey

Other names
- Derived: Turkic

Hakan is a common Turkish forename, based on the Turkish language variant of the imperial title Khagan.

The name is also spelled Khakan or Khaqan in other parts of the world, with the same etymology.

== Given name ==
- Ahmet Hakan Coşkun (born 1967), Turkish columnist
- Hakan Akkaya (born 1995), Turkish para fencer
- Hakan Akman (born 1989), Turkish footballer
- Hakan Altun (born 1972), Turkish singer
- Hakan Arıkan (born 1982), Turkish footballer
- Hakan Arslan (born 1988), Turkish footballer
- Hakan Aslantaş (born 1985), Turkish footballer
- Hakan Ayik (born 1979), Turkish-Australian criminal
- Hakan Balta (born 1983), Turkish-German footballer
- Hakan Bayraktar (born 1976), Turkish footballer
- Hakan Çalhanoğlu (born 1994), Turkish footballer
- Hakan Cengiz (born 1967), Turkish-German footballer
- Hakan Çevik (born 1976), Turkish Paralympic rifle shooter
- Hakan Demir (born 1968), Turkish basketball player
- Hakan Demirel (born 1986), Turkish basketball player
- Hakan Dinç (born 1963), Turkish race car driver
- Hakan Fertelli (born 1975), Turkish volleyball player
- Hakan Fidan (born 1968), Minister of Foreign Affairs of Turkey
- Hakan Gökçek (born 1993), Turkish-Australian footballer
- Hakan Hayrettin (born 1970), Turkish-British footballer
- Hakan Karahan (born 1960), Turkish writer
- Hakan Kıran (born 1962), Turkish architect
- Hakan Kiper (born 1973), Turkish swimmer
- Hakan Koç (born 1980), Turkish wrestler
- Hakan Köseoğlu (born 1981), Turkish basketball player
- Hakan Kutlu (born 1972), Turkish footballer
- Hakan Savaş Mican (born 1978), Turkish-German film director
- Hakan Massoud Navabi (born 1990), Afghan origin poet, writer
- Hakan Özmert (born 1985), Turkish-French footballer
- Hakan Özoğuz (born 1976), Turkish musician
- Hakan Peker (born 1961), Turkish dancer, songwriter, singer
- Hakan Söyler (born 1983), Turkish footballer
- Hakan Sürsal (born 1963), Turkish poet
- Hakan Şükür (born 1971), Turkish footballer
- Hakan Turan (born 1992), Turkish footballer
- Hakan Ünsal (born 1973), Turkish footballer
- Hakan Utangaç (born 1965), Turkish musician
- Hakan Ünsal (born 1973), Turkish footballer
- Hakan Yakin (born 1977), Turkish-Swiss footballer
- Hakan Yılmaz (weightlifter) (born 1982), Turkish weightlifter
- Musa Hakan Asyalı (born 1969), Turkish biomedical engineering scientist

=== Others ===
- Shahid Khaqan Abbasi (born 1958), Ex acting Prime Minister of Pakistan

== Fictional characters ==
- Hakan, a Turkish oil wrestler in the Street Fighter video game series
- Hakan II, the child emperor of Caldeum in the Diablo III video game, who is actually Belial, the Lord of Lies, in disguise.
- Hakan Demir, the main protagonist of The Protector (Turkish TV series)

== See also ==
- Håkan, a Swedish name
- Håkon, a Norwegian name
