= Hacon =

Hacon is a personal name. Notable people with the name include:

- Hacon of Sweden (disambiguation), multiple people
- Christopher Hacon (born 1970), mathematician with British, Italian and US nationalities
- Edith Hacon (1875–1952), Scottish suffragist from Dornoch, a World War One nursing volunteer, as well as an international socialite
- Rod Hacon, Australian Paralympic skier
- Hakon Sweynson

== See also ==
- Haakon (disambiguation)
- Håkan, given name
