= Hakon Jarl (disambiguation) =

Hakon Jarl, Haakon Jarl, or variants, may refer to:

== People ==
- Haakon Sigurdsson (c. 937 – 995), ruler of Norway 975–995
- Haakon Ericsson (c. 1029 – 1030), last of the Jarls of Lade, ruler of Norway 1012–1015
- Haakon Ivarsson (c. 1027 – 1080), jarl under Harald Hardrada
- Haakon Paulsson, co-ruler of Orkney with Magnus Erlendsson (1105–1123)

== Other uses ==
- Hakon Jarl (Smetana), a symphonic poem, 1860–1861

== See also ==
- Hakon Jarl runestones, in Sweden
