= Tysdal =

Tysdal is a surname. Notable people with the surname include:

- Daniel Scott Tysdal (born 1978), Canadian poet and film director
- Håkon Tysdal (1947–2019), Norwegian writer
