= Håkan =

- Pronunciation: [ˈhôːkan]
- Gender: Masculine

Origin
- Region of origin: Swedish

Other names
- Derived: Scandinavian name, probably meaning "high son"
- Related names: Haakon, Hakon, Haquin, Haqvin, Hawkins

Håkan is a common Swedish masculine given name.

== History ==
It has a common origin with the Norwegian given name Haakon (modern Norwegian Håkon, Danish Hakon) in the Old Norse Hákon. The meaning of the name is disputed but a possible meaning is "high son" from Old Norse há- (Proto-Norse hauha-) (high) and konr (kin).

On Swedish runestones the name is usually written Hakun and in medieval documents usually Haquon or in the Latinised versions Haqvin/Haqvinus. From the 16th century and onwards the name is usually written Håkan. Although in some western regions the name can be found as Håkon and Håka as late as in the 18th century.

In Old East Slavic the name was written Yakun (Cyrillic: Якун). For example, the Primary Chronicle mentions the Varangian leader Yakun that arrived in Kievan Rus' in the year 1024 and fought in the Battle of Listven. The name never became popular as a Slavic name but at least two high rank Novgorod officials had the name: the posadnik Yakun Andreevich (Cyrillic: Якун Андреевич) (mentioned 1167) and the tysyatsky Yakun Namnezhich (Cyrillic: Якун Намнежич) (mentioned 1214).

An old English name form Hacon has survived in English placenames like Haconby which literally means Hacon's Village, originating through Norse settlers in England.

== People ==
Some notable people by this name are:

- Håkan Algotsson (born 1966), ice hockey player
- Håkan Andersson (motorcyclist) (born 1945), Swedish motocross rider
- Håkan Andersson (ice hockey) (born 1965), ice hockey executive
- Håkan Bengtsson (1942–2026), Swedish swimmer
- Håkan Bergman (born 1954), Swedish politician
- Håkan Carlqvist (1954–2017), motocross rider
- Håkan Dahlby (born 1965), double trap shooter
- Håkan Eriksson (orienteer) (born 1961), orienteering competitor
- Håkan Eriksson (ice hockey) (born 1956), ice hockey player
- Håkan Fredriksson, producer and musician
- Håkan Hagegård (born 1945), baritone
- Håkan Hardenberger (born 1961), trumpeter
- Håkan Hellström (born 1974), musical artist
- Håkan Isacson (1943–2002), Swedish intelligence agent
- Håkan Jeppsson (1961–2018), Swedish football executive
- Håkan Juholt (born 1962), politician
- Håkan Jörgensen, author and freelance journalist
- Håkan Karlsson (born 1970), freestyle swimmer
- Håkan Lans (born 1947), inventor
- Håkan Larsson (cyclist), cyclist
- Håkan Larsson (politician), politician
- Håkan Loob (born 1960), ice hockey player
- Håkan Magnusson, 14th-century king of Sweden
- Håkan Malmrot (1900–1987), swimmer
- Håkan Malmström (born 1977), football player
- Håkan Mild (born 1971), football player
- Håkan Nesser (born 1950), author
- Håkan Persson, musical journalist
- Håkan Pettersson (ice hockey), professional ice hockey player
- Håkan Pettersson (Swedish Air Force officer), a retired officer of the Swedish Air Force
- Håkan Pettersson (orienteer), orienteering competitor
- Håkan Samuelsson (born 1951), Swedish businessman
- Håkan Sandell (born 1962), poet
- Håkan Spegel (1645–1714), 17-18th century writer
- Håkan Svensson (born 1970), football player
- Håkan Syrén (born 1952), general
- Håkan Södergren (born 1959), ice hockey player
- Håkan Westergren (1899–1981), actor
- Håkan Wirenstrand, keyboardist for Little Dragon
- Håkan the Red, 11th-century king of Sweden

== See also ==
- Hakan, a Turkish name (unrelated)
- Håkon, a Norwegian name
