= Haakon VII (disambiguation) =

Haakon VII (1872–1957) was King of Norway from 1905 to 1957.

Haakon VII or King Haakon VII or variation, may also refer to:

== Ships ==
- HNoMS King Haakon VII, a Royal Norwegian Navy escort ship in commission from 1942 to 1951
- HNoMS Haakon VII (A537), a Royal Norwegian Navy training ship in commission from 1958 to 1974

== Places ==
=== Norway ===
- Haakon VII Land, Spitsbergen, Svalbard, Norway
- Haakon VII street, Trondheim, Norway
- Haakon VII Toppen (Haakon VII Peak), a peak on Beerenberg, Jan Mayan, Norway

=== Antarctica ===
- King Haakon VII Vidde (Haakon VII Plateau), a plateau in Antarctica
- King Haakon VII Sea, East Antarctica, Southern Ocean

== See also ==
- Haakon (disambiguation)
