= Haakon (given name) =

- Hákon the Good, by Peter Nicolai Arbo. The name Haakon is mostly known for being the name of several kings of Scandinavian origin.
- Pronunciation: Norwegian: [ˈhôːkʊn]
- Gender: Male

Origin
- Origin: Norwegian
- Meaning: "High Son" from há (high, chosen) and konr (son, descendant, kin)

Other names
- Related names: Hakon, Háukon, Håkon, Haquin, Haqvin, Hawkins

Haakon, also spelled Håkon (in Norway), Hakon (in Denmark), Håkan (in Sweden), or Háukon or Hákon, is an older spelling of the modern Norwegian form of the Old Norwegian masculine first name Hákon meaning "High Son" from há (high, chosen) and konr (son, descendant, kin). An old English form is Hacon as in Haconby, Hacon's Village. The name appears in Scottish Gaelic as Àcainn, as seen in the place-name Kyleakin, meaning 'Haakon's Narrows', being named after King Haakon IV of Norway.

Haakon or Håkon was the name of several Norwegian rulers.

== Rulers ==
- Haakon the Good, King of Norway (c. 920–961)
- Haakon Sigurdsson (c. 937–995), also known as Earl Haakon, effective ruler of Norway from about 975 to 995
- Haakon Ericsson (died c. 1029–1030), grandson of Haakon Sigurdsson, ruler of the Kingdom of the Isles from 1016 until his death, and vassal ruler of Norway under Cnut the Great from 1028
- Håkan the Red, an obscure King of Sweden who ruled sometime in the 11th century.
- Haakon Ivarsson, (c. 1027–1080), earl of Västergötland under King Stenkil of Sweden and later earl of Halland under King Sweyn II of Denmark
- Haakon Magnusson of Norway (1068–1095), partially recognised as king from 1093 to 1095
- Haakon II of Norway (1147–1162), known as Haakon Herdebrei
- Haakon III of Norway (1182–1204), known as Haakon Sverreson
- Haakon IV of Norway (1204–1263), known as Haakon the Old
- Óspakr (died 1230), who took the regnal name Hákon when briefly appointed King of the Isles by Haakon IV in 1230
- Haakon V of Norway (1270–1319), known as Haakon V Magnusson
- Haakon VI of Norway (1340–1380), known as Haakon VI Magnusson, also King of Sweden
- Haakon VII of Norway (1872–1957), born Prince Carl of Denmark
- Haakon VIII of Norway (born 1973)

== Others ==
- Haakon Arnold (1897–1968), Norwegian actor
- Håkon Bleken (1929–2025), Norwegian painter
- Haakon Chevalier (1901–1985), American translator and friend of J. Robert Oppenheimer
- Håkon Evjen (born 2000), Norwegian footballer
- Håkon Five (1880–1944), Norwegian politician
- Håkon Gebhardt (born 1969), Norwegian musician and record producer
- Håkon Haugli (born 1969), Norwegian jurist, administrator and politician for the Labour Party
- Haakon Hjelde (1902–1933), Norwegian actor
- Haakon Lie (1905–2009), Norwegian politician and centenarian
- Håkon Lundenes (born 1954), Norwegian ice hockey player
- Håkon Opdal (born 1982), Norwegian footballer
- Håkon Skogseid (born 1988), Norwegian footballer
- Haakon Stein (1940–2025), German fencer
- Håkon Tysdal (1947–2019), Norwegian writer
- Håkon Wium Lie (born 1965), Norwegian web pioneer and inventor of CSS

== Fictional characters ==
- Haakon Haakonsen, protagonist of the 1990 film "Shipwrecked", which was based on Norwegian author Oluf Falck-Ytter's book Haakon Haakonsen: En Norsk Robinson (Haakon Haakonsen: A Norwegian Robinson).
- Håkon, one of the two mascots of the 1994 Winter Olympics
- Hakon One-Eye, one of the Ancient Nord Heroes who fights and vanquishes Alduin the World-Eater (a dragon god) in the 2011 video game The Elder Scrolls V: Skyrim
- Hakkon Wintersbreath is one of the gods of the Avvar culture in the Dragon Age universe. A faction who is dedicated to his worship is an enemy faction encountered during the Jaws of Hakkon DLC for Dragon Age: Inquisition.

== See also ==
- Haakon, a Varangian mentioned in the inscription on the Piraeus Lion
- Hakon Jarl runestones
- Haakon County, South Dakota

== See also ==
- Hagen (surname), a Danish surname
- Hakan, a Turkish name
