= Haakon =

Haakon may refer to:

== Given names ==
- Haakon (given name)
- Håkon, modern Norwegian spelling of the name
- Håkan, Swedish spelling of the name
- Hakon, Danish spelling of the name

== People ==
=== Norwegian royalty ===
- Haakon the Good, King of Norway (c. 920–961)
- Haakon Sigurdsson, Earl of Hlaðir (c. 937–995), king of Norway in all but name
- Haakon Ericsson (died c. 1029–1030), Earl of Lade and governor of Norway from 1012 to 1015 as a vassal under Danish king Knut the Great
- Haakon Magnusson of Norway (1068–94)
- Haakon II of Norway (died 1162), Haakon Herdebrei
- Haakon III of Norway (1170s–1204), Haakon Sverreson
- Haakon IV of Norway (1204–1263), the Old
- Haakon V of Norway (1270–1319), Haakon V Magnusson
- Haakon VI of Norway (c. 1340–1380), as Håkan also King of Sweden
- Haakon VII of Norway (1872–1957)
- Haakon VIII of Norway (born 1973)

=== Other people ===
- Håkan the Red (fl. late 11th century), Swedish ruler
- Haakon Paulsson (c.1105 – 1123), Earl of Orkney
- Haakon the Crazy (died 1214), Norwegian noble
- Haakon Chevalier (1901 – 1985), American author, translator, and professor of French literature
- Håkon Wium Lie, a web technologist (born in 1965)

== Places ==
- Haakon County, South Dakota, United States

== Ships ==
- HNoMS King Haakon VII, a Royal Norwegian Navy escort ship in commission from 1942 to 1951
- HNoMS Haakon VII (A537), a Royal Norwegian Navy training ship in commission from 1958 to 1974

== See also ==
- Haakonian Order, fictional extraterrestrial race in Star Trek
- Haakon VII (disambiguation)
