= Dormition Cathedral, Kyiv Pechersk Lavra =

Dormition Cathedral
- Cathedral of the Dormition of Theotokos
- Успенський собор
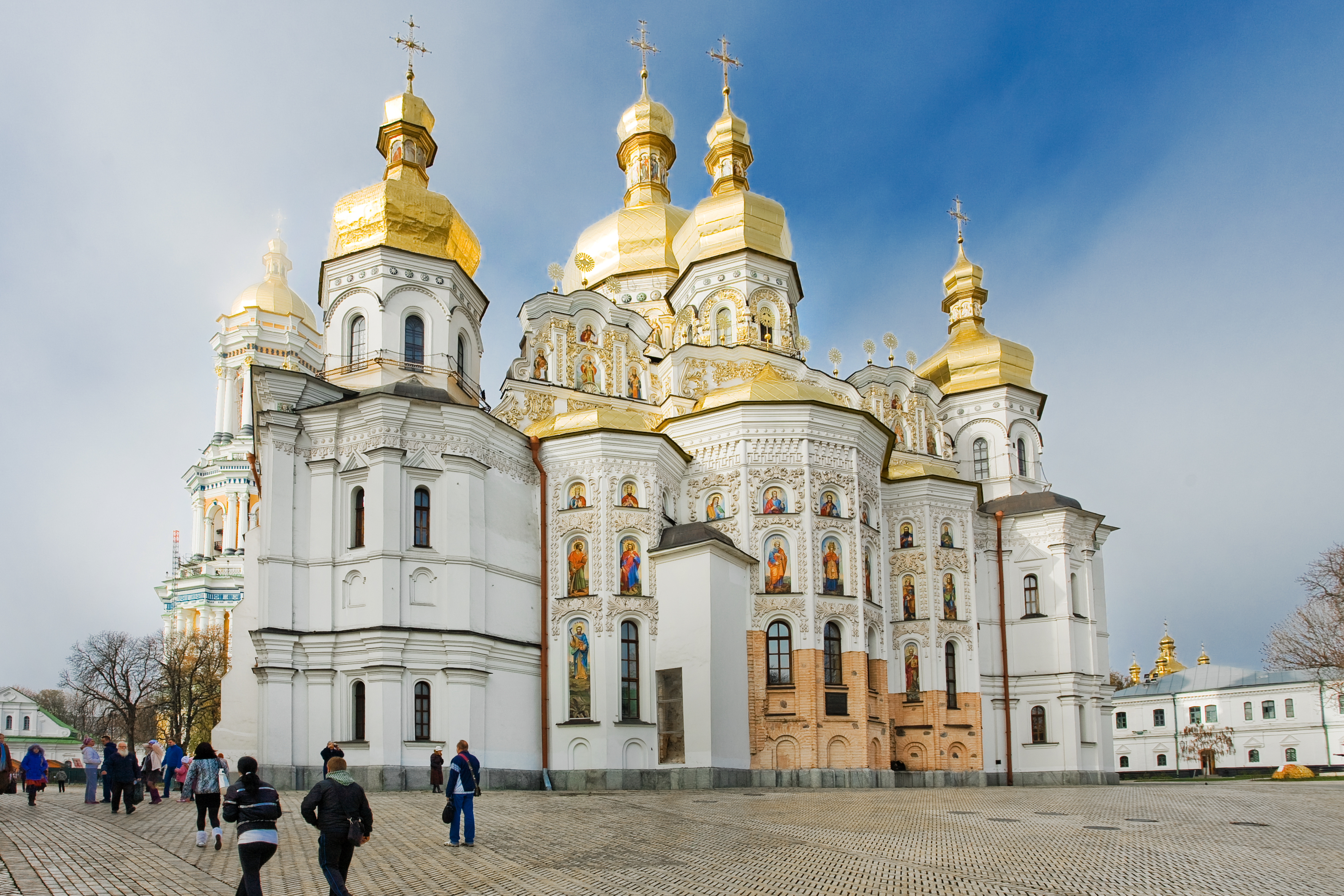
- The Dormition Cathedral of the Kyiv Pechersk Lavra in Kyiv, Ukraine.
- Dormition Cathedral
- 50°26′07″N 30°33′27″E
- Location: Kyiv, Ukraine
- Denomination: Orthodox Church of Ukraine

History
- Dedication: Dormition of the Mother of God

Architecture
- Architect: Theodosius of Kiev (originally)
- Style: Byzantine (originally); Ukrainian Baroque (since 1729)
- Groundbreaking: 1073
- Completed: 1078

Immovable Monument of National Significance of Ukraine
- Official name: Успенський собор з автентичними залишками ХІ-ХVII ст. (Dormition Cathedral with authentic remains from 11th–17th centuries)
- Type: Architecture
- Reference no.: 260088/1

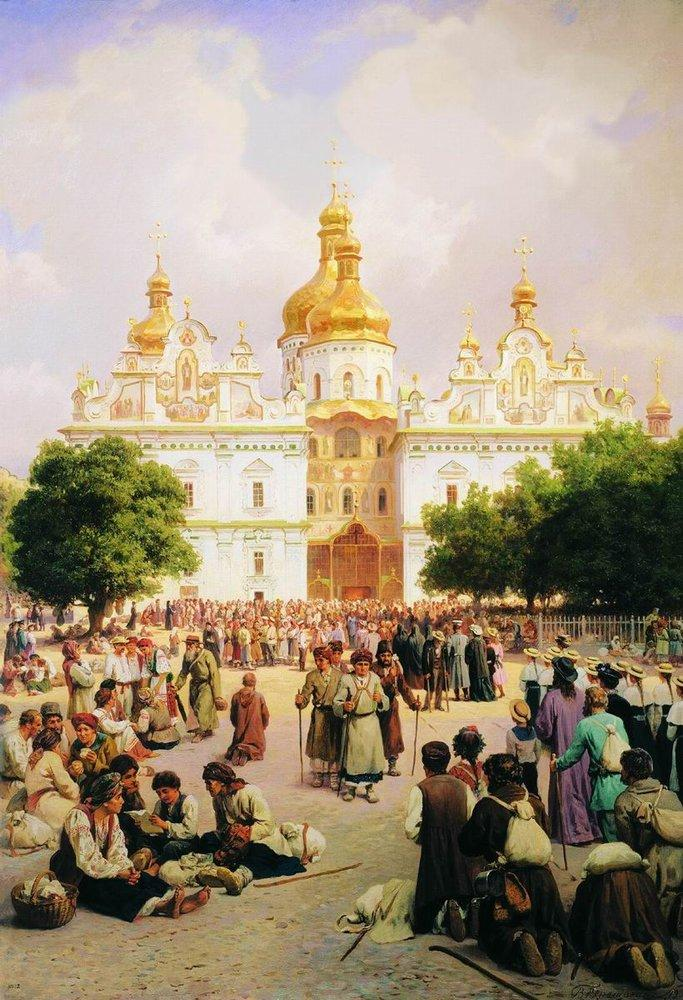
The Great Church of the Kyiv Monastery of the Caves by Vasily Vereshchagin (1905)

The Dormition Cathedral (Ukrainian: Собор Успіння Пресвятої Богородиці, romanized: Sobor Uspinnia Presviatoi Bohorodytsi) of the Kyiv Pechersk Lavra, also referred to as the Great Church, is the main cathedral of the monastery complex. In the time of the Kyivan Rus the cathedral also served as the necropolis for the Kyivan princes.

The Dormition Cathedral is an important landmark of the Kyiv Pechersk Lavra National Reserve.

== History ==
The original church was built on initiative of Theodosius of Kiev in 1073–1078. The construction was primarily financed by Sviatoslav II of Kiev. According to the Kyiv Caves Patericon, several Byzantine masters arrived from Constantinople. Several legends exist related to construction of the church, particularly one connected with the Varangian warrior Shimon the Varangian.

Dormition Cathedral has been damaged and restored numerous times. In 13th century it was damaged by the 1230 Kyiv earthquake and the 1240 siege of Kiev by Khan Batu. The cathedral was restored in 1470, but in 1482 it was damaged again during the Crimean raid of Meñli I Giray. It was eventually restored again. In 1718 it was damaged during a Kyiv city fire. In 1729 cathedral was restored in the Ukrainian Baroque style and expanded.

In 1928, the monastery was converted into an anti-religious museum park by the Soviet authorities. The main church of the monastery was destroyed during World War II, two months after the Wehrmacht occupied the city of Kyiv. Retreating Soviet troops conducted the controversial 1941 Khreshchatyk explosions. Scorched earth tactics were also applied to the Kyiv bridges over Dnieper as well as the main Khreshchatyk street and Kyiv Pechersk Lavra. (The destruction of the cathedral followed a pattern of Soviet disregard for cultural heritage, as they previously blew up the ancient St. Michael's Golden-Domed Monastery nearby in the 1930s.)

The destruction of the cathedral on 3 November 1941 has been a matter of some historical controversy, the NKVD having had mined the building on 16–17 September before evacuating the city. Soviet authorities in the 1960s claimed that Soviet saboteurs under Ivan Kudrya were responsible for the demolition, whereas Albert Speer in his memoirs wrote that German Reichskommissar Erich Koch had ordered the demolition.

The church was finally restored in 1995 after Ukraine regained its independence. Its reconstruction was accomplished in two years, and the new Dormition Church consecrated in 2000.

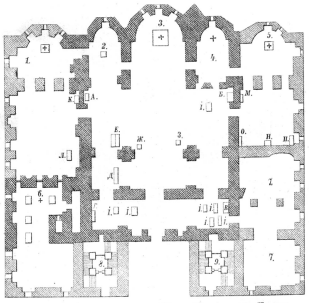
Floor plan of the church (east at top)

On 15 June 2026 at 2:00 a.m. Russia struck the Dormition Cathedral during a mass drone and missile attack on several cities across Ukraine, setting the church on fire. The fire was extinguished by the emergency services at 8:35 a.m. Some 800 m² of the building was damaged. The Security Service of Ukraine (SBU) stated that at least two Geran-2 drones had struck the building, their remains being found at the site. Ukrainian Prime Minister Yulia Svyrydenko condemned the attack as a "brutal assault on our people and our heritage." The attacks killed at least four people in Kyiv.

== Gallery ==
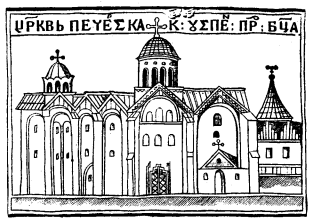
Illustration from the book Conversations of Saint John Chrysostom (1623)

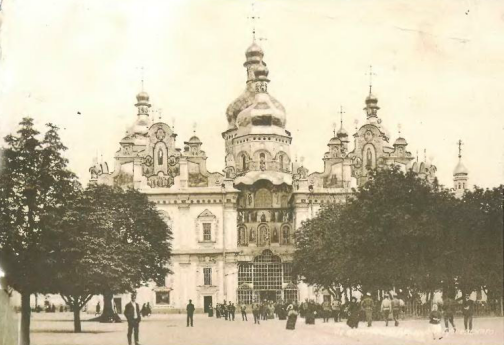
1911 photograph of the Cathedral

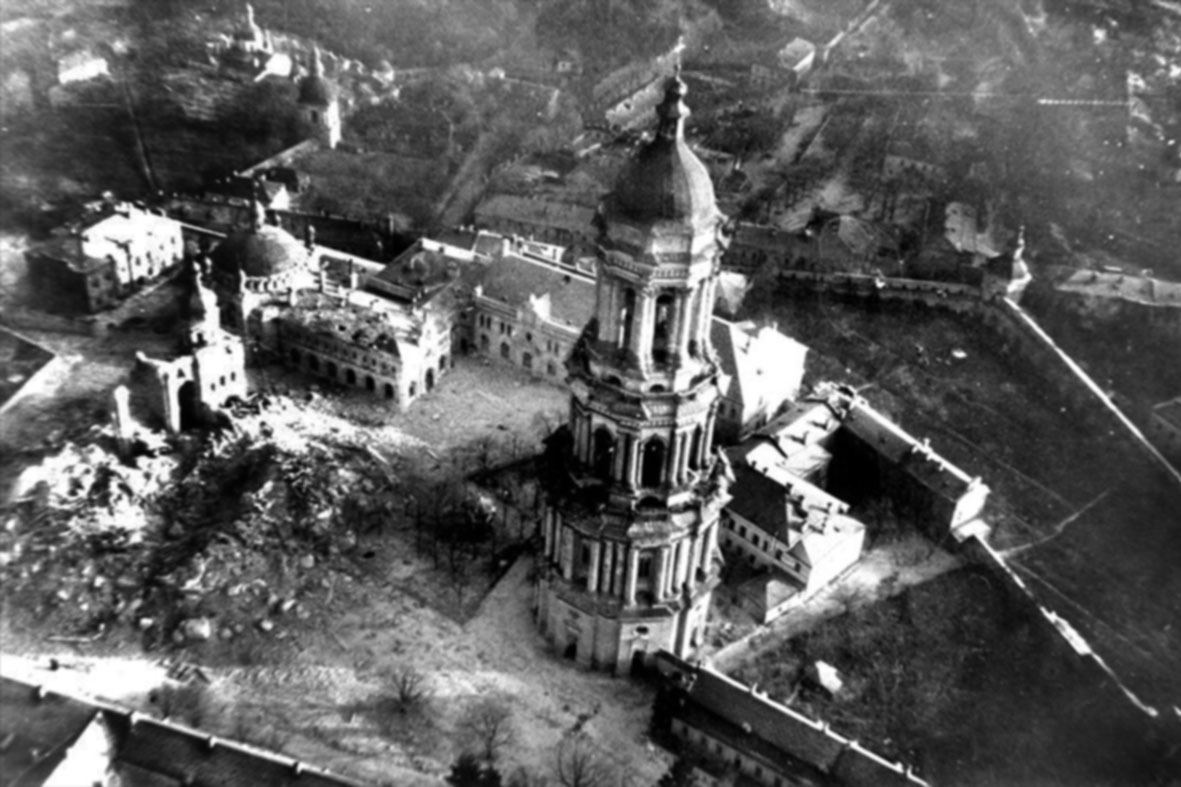
Destroyed Dormition Cathedral (1942)

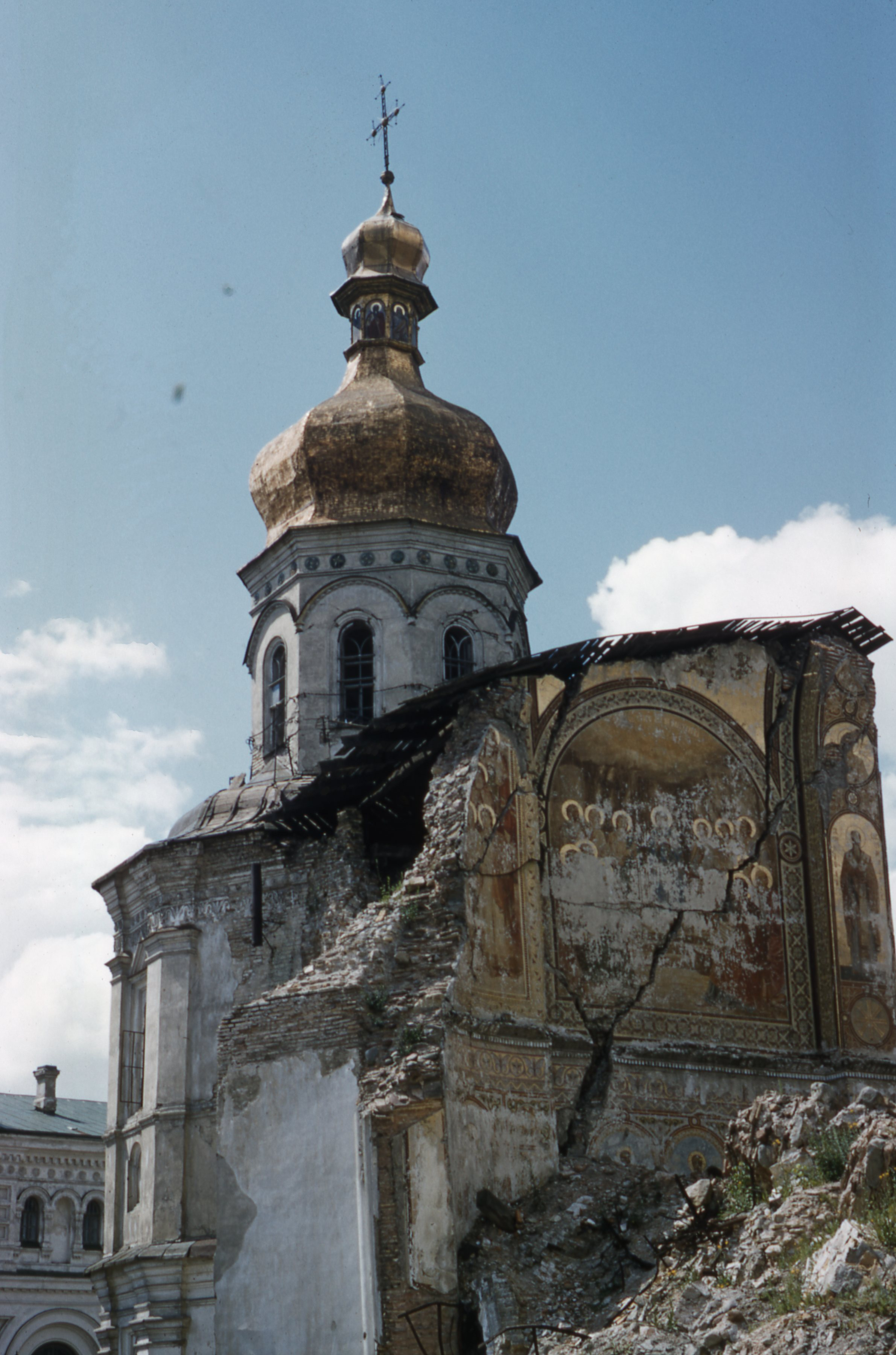
The cathedral in ruins after WWII (1958)

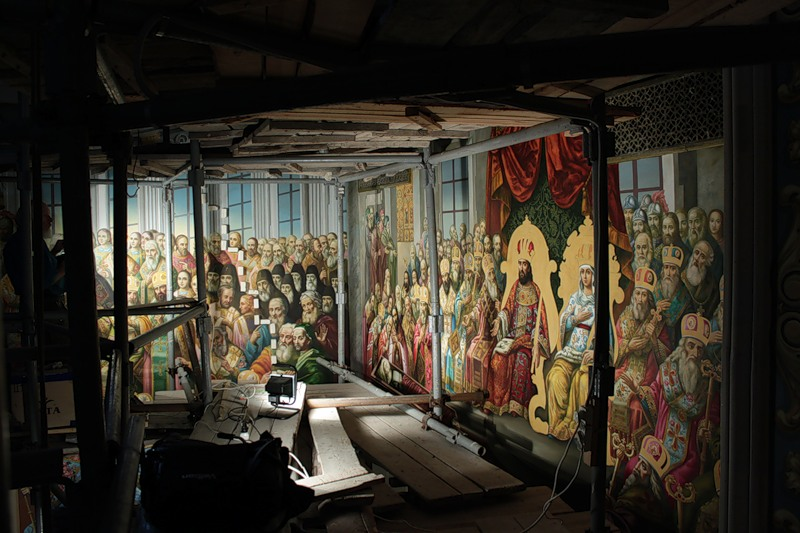
Workspace of muralist L. Dmytrenko (2010)

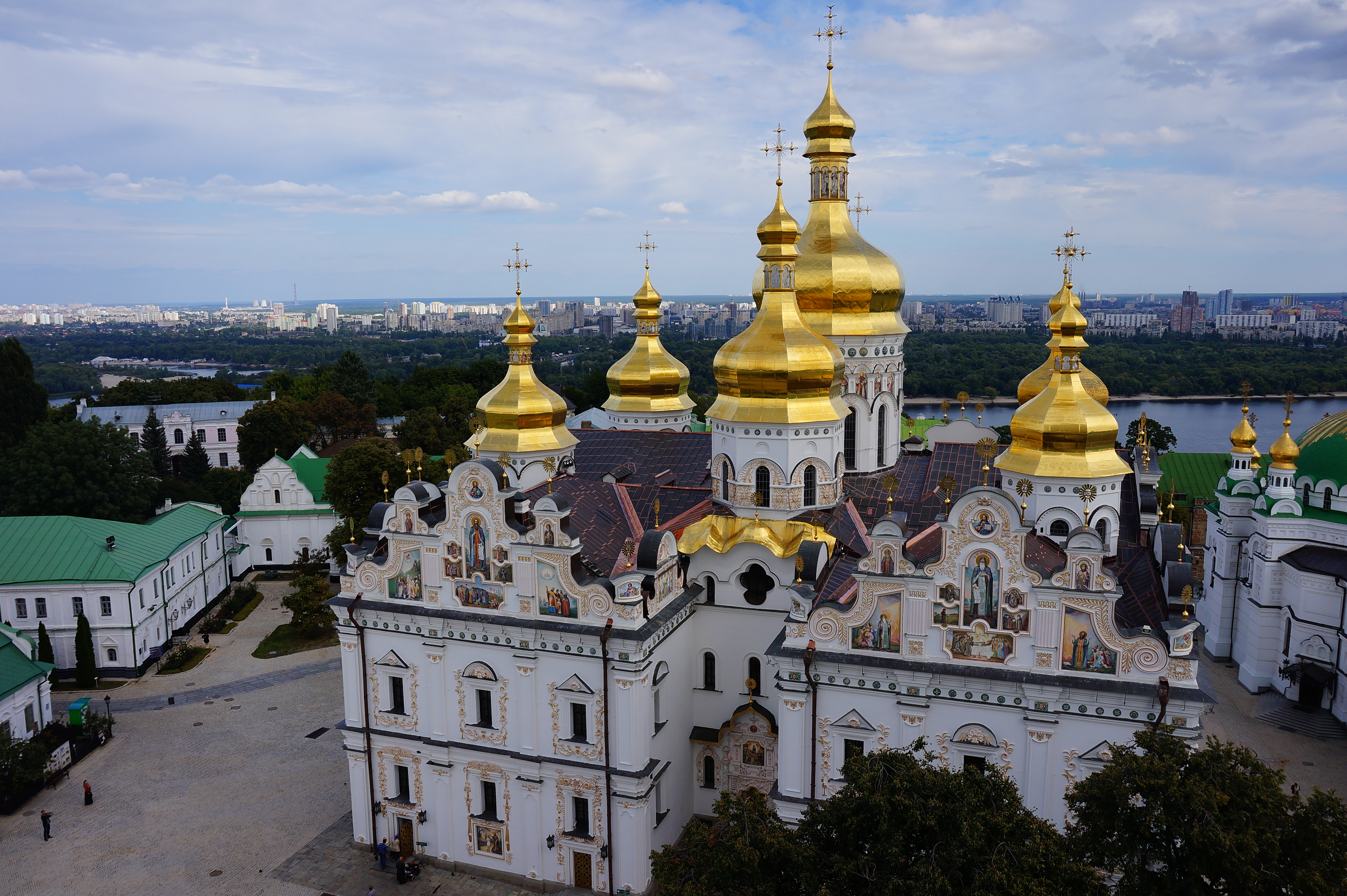
Aerial view looking east (2015)

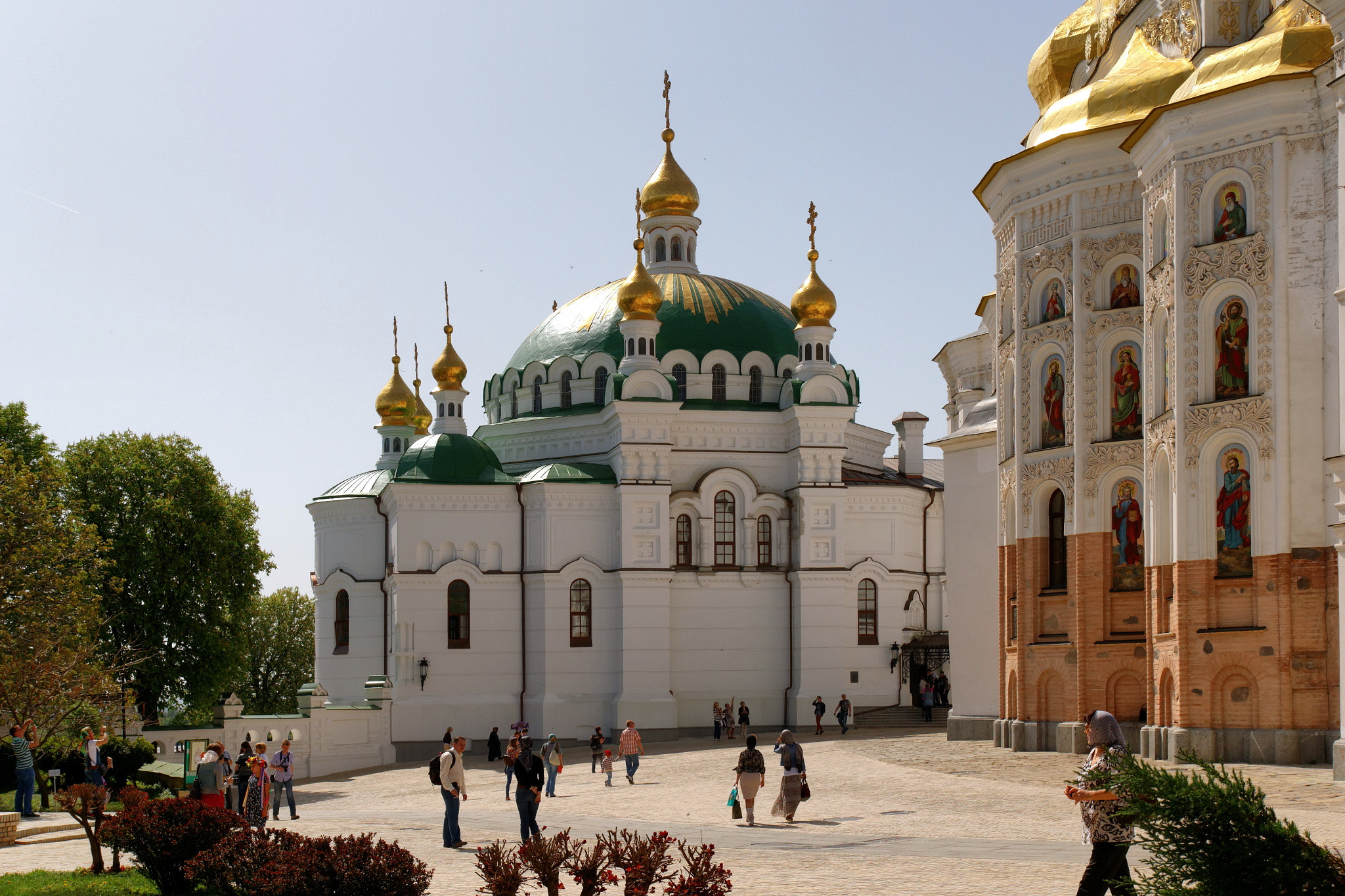
Eastern apses with the Refectory Church in the background

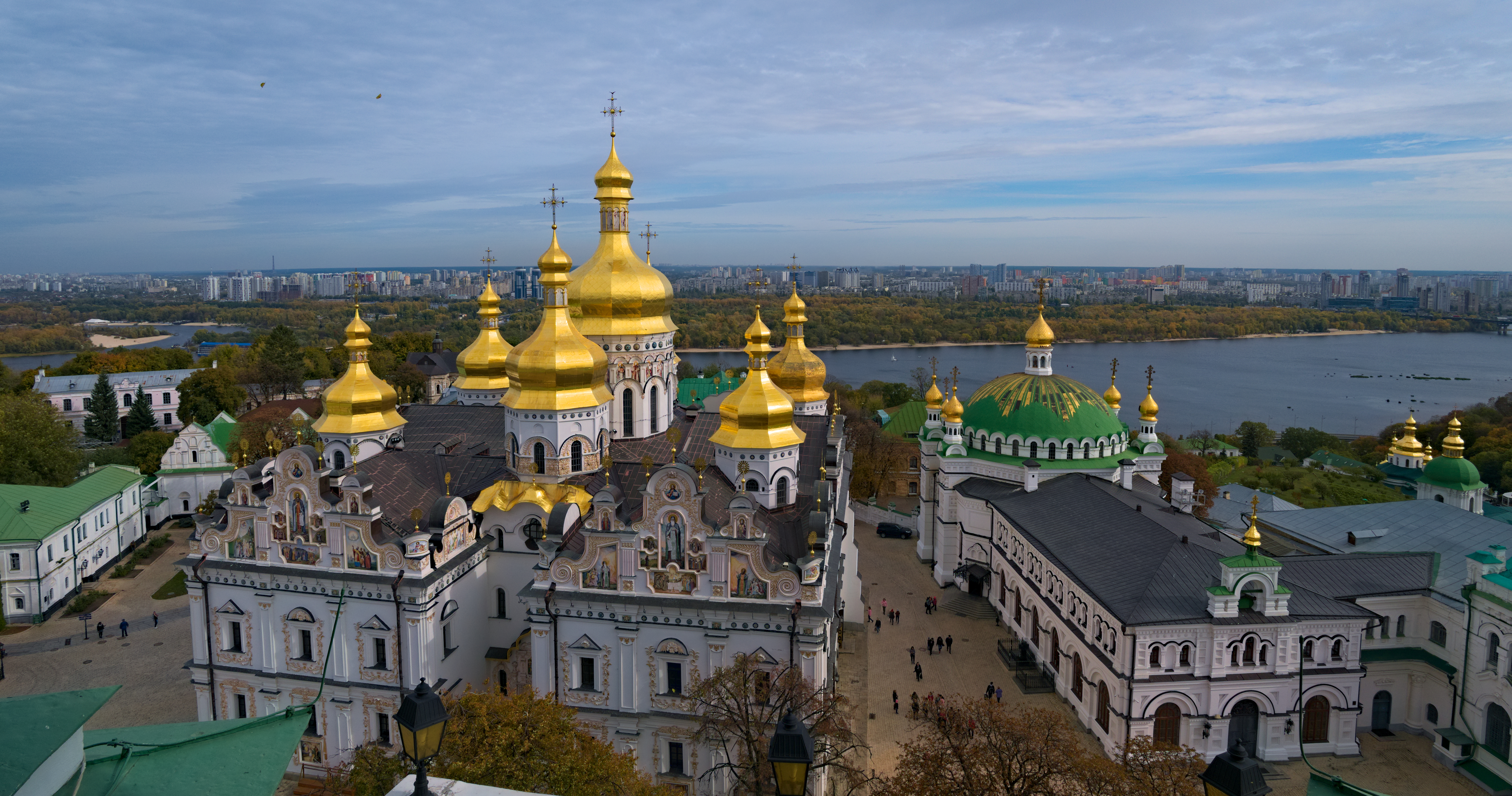
Dormition and Refectory churches side by side

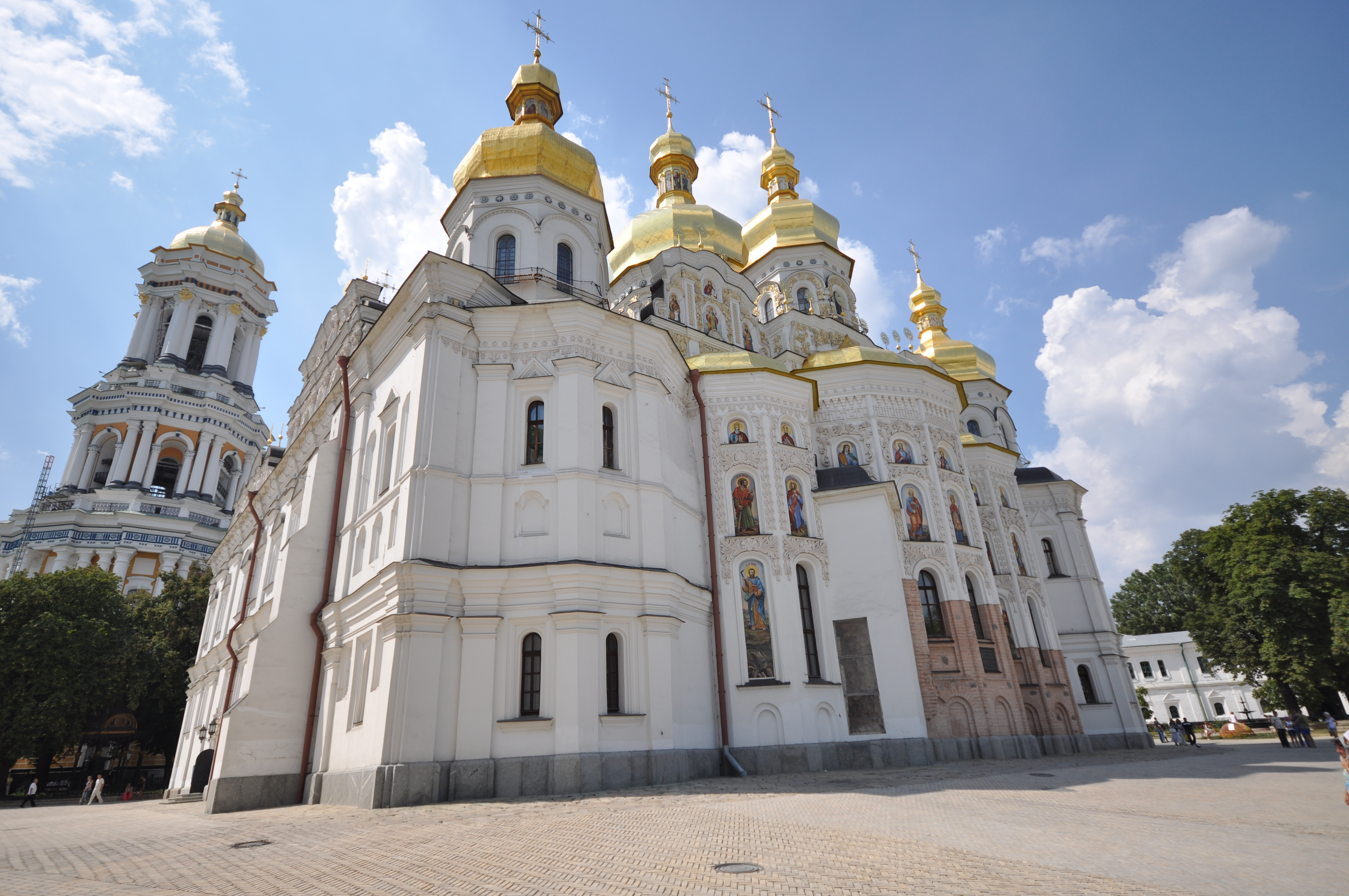
Dnieper or eastern side of the Cathedral and the Bell Tower

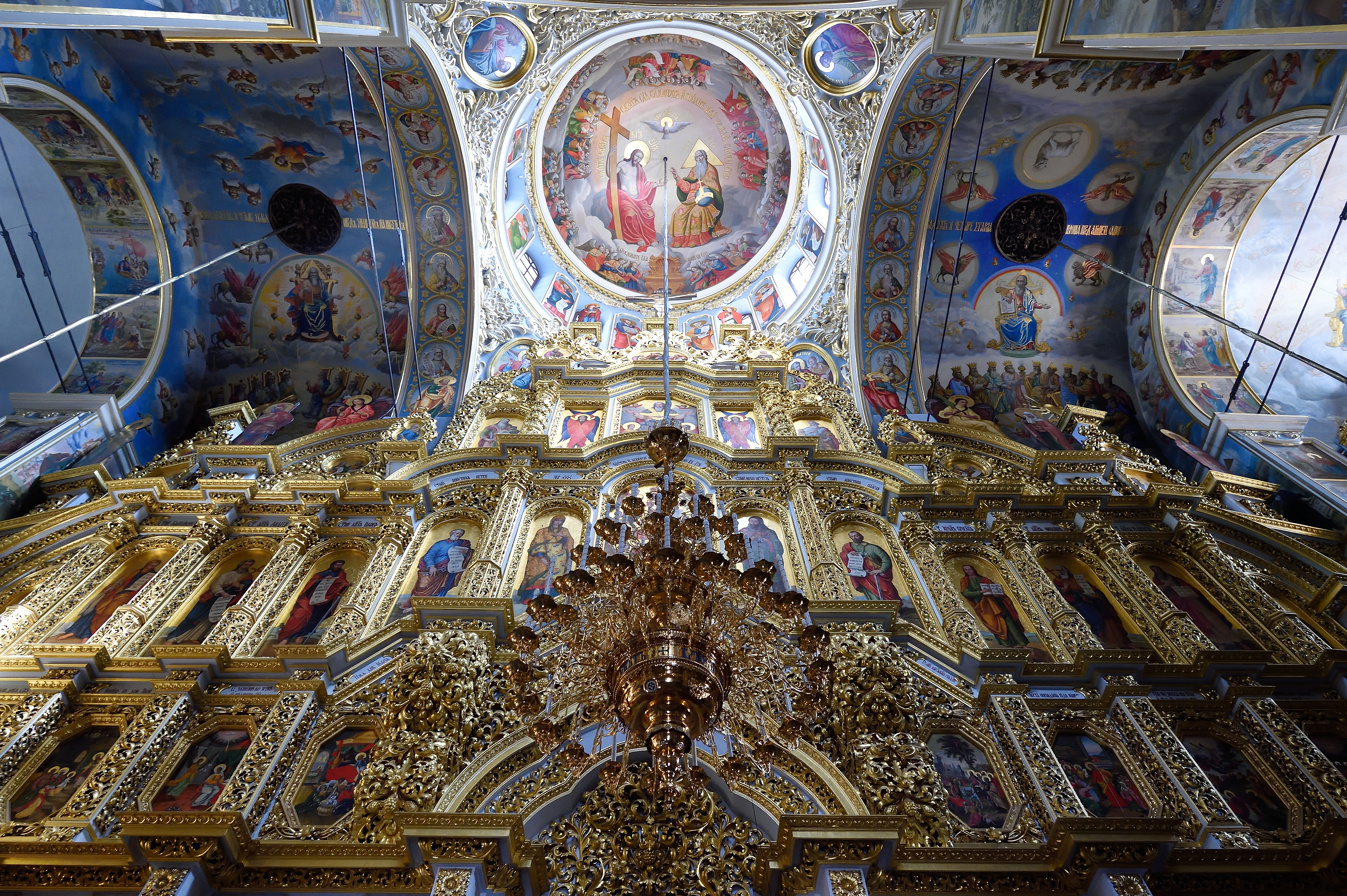
Cathedral ceiling in front of the iconostasis

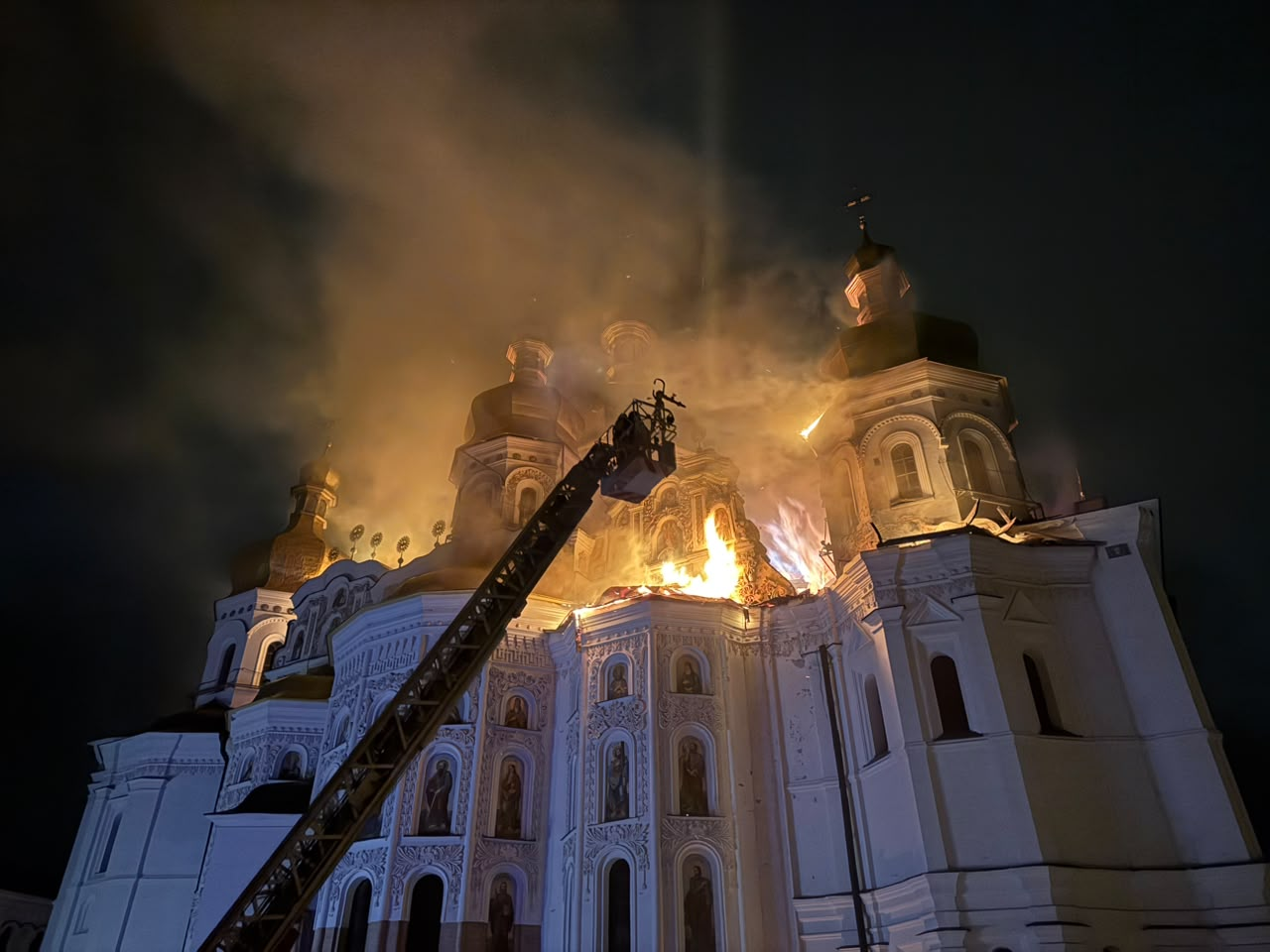
The Cathedral after the attack of 15 June 2026

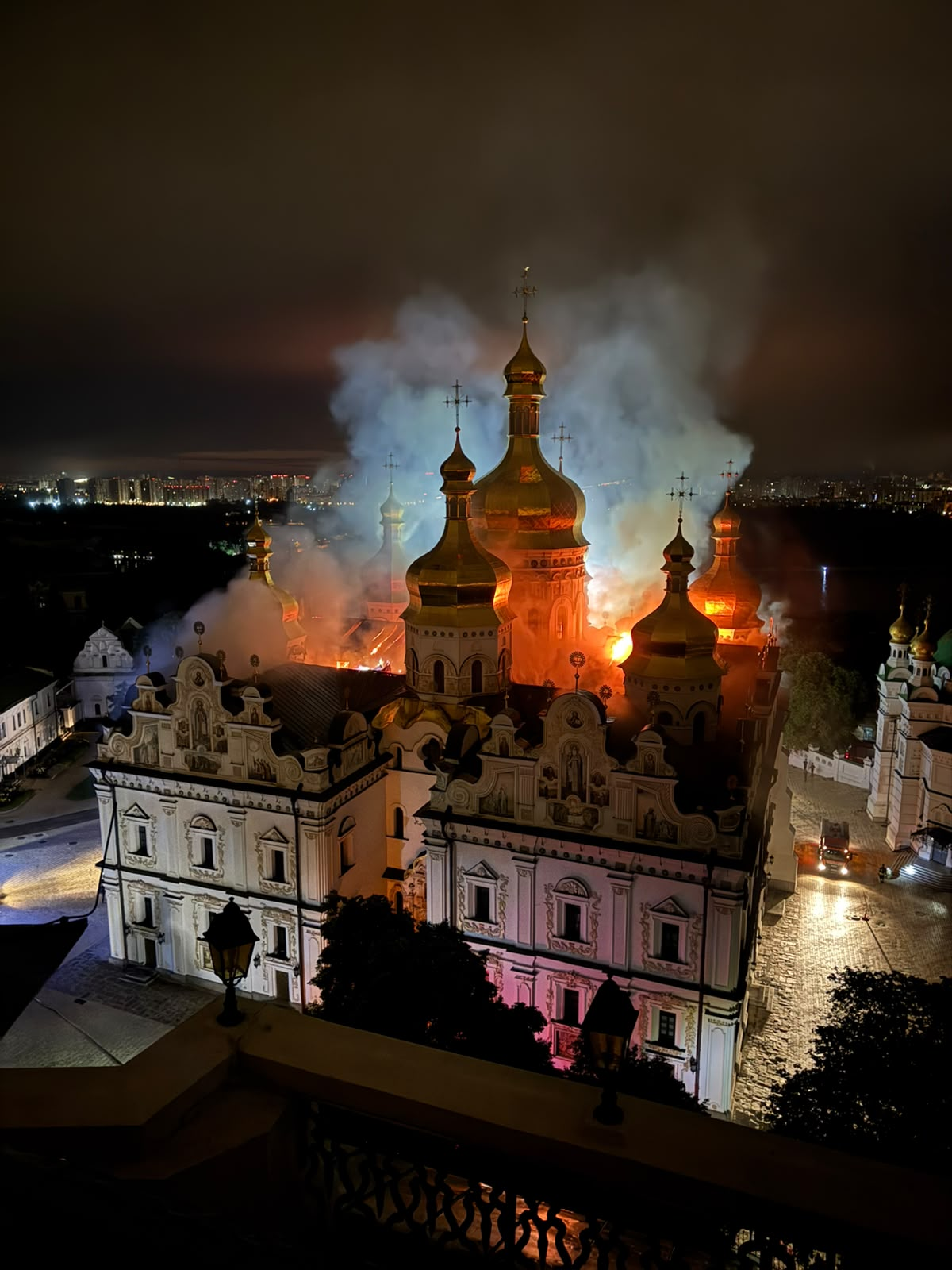
The cathedral on fire following the Russian attack
