= Haakon Magnusson =

Haakon Magnusson or Håkon Magnusson may refer to:

- Haakon Toresfostre (1068–1095), son of Magnus II of Norway, recognized as king only in Trondheim
- Haakon V (1270–1319), King of Norway from 1299 until 1319.
- Haakon VI (1340–1380), King of Norway from 1343 until 1380

== See also ==
- Haakon (disambiguation)
