= Jakun =

Jakun may refer to:

- Yakun, an 11th-century Viking warrior in Russia.
- Jakun people
- Jakun language
