= Sandhya Samarasinghe =

New Zealand engineering academic

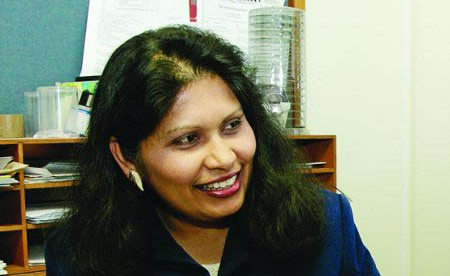
- Education: Virginia Tech
- Scientific career
- Fields: Software modelling of biological systems
- Workplaces: Lincoln University
- Thesis: Long-term creep modeling of wood using time temperature superposition principle (1991)

Sandhya Samarasinghe is a New Zealand engineering academic and currently a full professor at the Lincoln University.

== Academic career ==
Samarasinghe earned a Master's of Science in Mechanical Engineering at Patrice Lumumba University, Moscow, and a Master's and PhD in Engineering at Virginia Tech. After her 1991 PhD thesis, titled 'Long-term creep modeling of wood using time temperature superposition principle' , she moved to Lincoln University, rising to full professor.

Much of Samarasinghe's work involves software modelling of complex biological systems.

== Selected works ==
- Samarasinghe, Sandhya. Neural networks for applied sciences and engineering: from fundamentals to complex pattern recognition. Auerbach publications, 2016.
- Cominetti, Ornella, Anastasios Matzavinos, Sandhya Samarasinghe, Don Kulasiri, Sijia Liu, Philip Maini, and Radek Erban. "DifFUZZY: a fuzzy clustering algorithm for complex datasets." International Journal of Computational Intelligence in Bioinformatics and Systems Biology 1, no. 4 (2010): 402-417.
- Kulasiri, Don, Lan K. Nguyen, Sandhya Samarasinghe, and Zhi Xie. "A review of systems biology perspective on genetic regulatory networks with examples." Current Bioinformatics 3, no. 3 (2008): 197-225.
- Wijethunga, P., Sandhya Samarasinghe, Don Kulasiri, and Ian Woodhead. "Digital image analysis based automated kiwifruit counting technique." In Image and Vision Computing New Zealand, 2008. IVCNZ 2008. 23rd International Conference, pp. 1–6. IEEE, 2008.
- Samarasinghe, Sandhya, and Don Kulasiri. "Stress intensity factor of wood from crack-tip displacement fields obtained from digital image processing." Silva Fennica 38, no. 3 (2004): 267-278.
