= Shimon the Varangian =

Šimon (Old Norse: Sigmundr) was a Varangian (Viking) whose story is related in the Kievan Patericon and his story concerns the creation of the Kievan cave monastery, where he is reported to have been its most important donor.

== Story ==
Šimon was the son of Afrikan (ON: Afreki), a king in the land of the Varangians. Afrikan was the brother of Yakun (ON: Hákon) who took part in the Battle of Listven. When Afrikan died Jakun expelled Šimon and his brother Friand (ON: Friandi).

Šimon would live in Kievan Rus' for the rest of his life, and he first served Yaroslav I the Wise and later his son. In 1068, he joined Yaroslav's three sons in the Battle of the Alta River against the Polovtsians. It is reported that before the battle, saint Anthony of Kiev, predicted a dire outcome for the battle, but he also predicted that Šimon would be saved through a miracle. Šimon survived the battle, but he was severely wounded. Anthony took care of Šimon and healed his wounds. In recognition, when Anthony founded the cave monastery, Šimon donated a belt and a wreath of gold that his father Afrikan had used to adorn a crucifix. The gifts were worth 50 gold grivnas. The Varangian was probably one of the first to be buried in the monastery and he was the first one to receive a written remission from the monastery that both he and his descendants were pardoned for all their sins.

His son Georgi also showed affection for the cave monastery and sent gold and silver from Suzdal to the decoration of the grave of Saint Theodosius of Kiev. When Gregori died, he left a letter to his family asking them to help the monastery financially. Šimon's great-grandchildren were buried in the Dmitri church in Suzdal, which was built by its bishop Jefrem who had been ordained in the cave monastery.

== Scandinavian sources ==
Based on Vilhelm Thomsen's identification between the names Alfrekr and Alrikr, Stender-Petersen connected Afrikan to the Alrekr who appears on the runestones Sö 101 and Sö 106 in Sweden. Omeljan Pritsak, however, opposes this identification as he considers Jakun to have been Jarl Hákon Eiríksson who died in 1029, while Alrekr would not yet have been born.

The first scholar who undertook to identify the people mentioned in the Patericon was Fyodor Braun, and he suggested that Afrikan was based on an archaic pronunciation of the Old Norse dialect of Södermanland. The form would have been an oblique case of *afreki, i.e. *afriką (son) < *afrikan. The name Friand would not have been the name of a person, since the name is otherwise not attested among the Old Norse names, and Braun suggested that it was the appellative form of frjá ("to love"), frjándi, and which meant "nephew" in some Old Norse sources. Likewise, he did not consider Šimon to be derived from Sigmundr because ši reflected the Södermanland pronunciation of si, and thus Šimon referred to a Varangian having the Christian name Simon. According to Braun, the Patronicon was based on the account of a Varangian who would have reported that "Jakun had expelled his nephew (*frjándi) Simon Afrekąson".

Basing himself on Braun's analysis, Pritsak suggests that Jarl Hákon Eiríksson had a brother named *Afreki who is unattested in Old Norse sources. This brother would have died and then Hákon banished his nephew Simon which may have been due to Afreki having cooperated with Olaf II of Norway. Simon would have been only c. 12 years old.

== See also ==
- Vorontsov - one of several Russian noble families who claimed male-line descent from Šimon

== Bibliography ==
- Pritsak, O. (1981). The origin of Rus'. Cambridge, Massachusetts: Distributed by Harvard University Press for the Harvard Ukrainian Research Institute.
- Androshchuk, F. "Kristna nordbor i Rus / Scandinavian Christians in Rus", in Berg, K. & Olsson, O. (eds.): Historiska Nyheter – Olga & Ingegerd. Statens historiska museum 2004-2005. p. 44.
