= Hakon =

Danish spelling of the Norwegian name Håkon

Hakon is the Danish spelling of the Norwegian name Håkon or Haakon. The name is also related to the Danish form Hagen (given name) and Hagen (surname).

Those with the name include:

- Hakon Sunnivasson (fl. 1131), Danish nobleman and the father of Eric III of Denmark
- Hakon Andersen (1875–1959), Danish organist and composer for organ
- Hakon Børresen (1876–1954), Danish composer

== See also ==
- Hakon Jarl (disambiguation)
- Hakon Jarl runestones, stones from around the 12th century found in Denmark with two inscribed mentioning a "jarl" (earl) named Hakon
- Hakon Jarl (Smetana), a symphonic poem
- Hakone, a town in Japan
