= Šimon Zajíček =

Czech ice hockey player (born 2001)

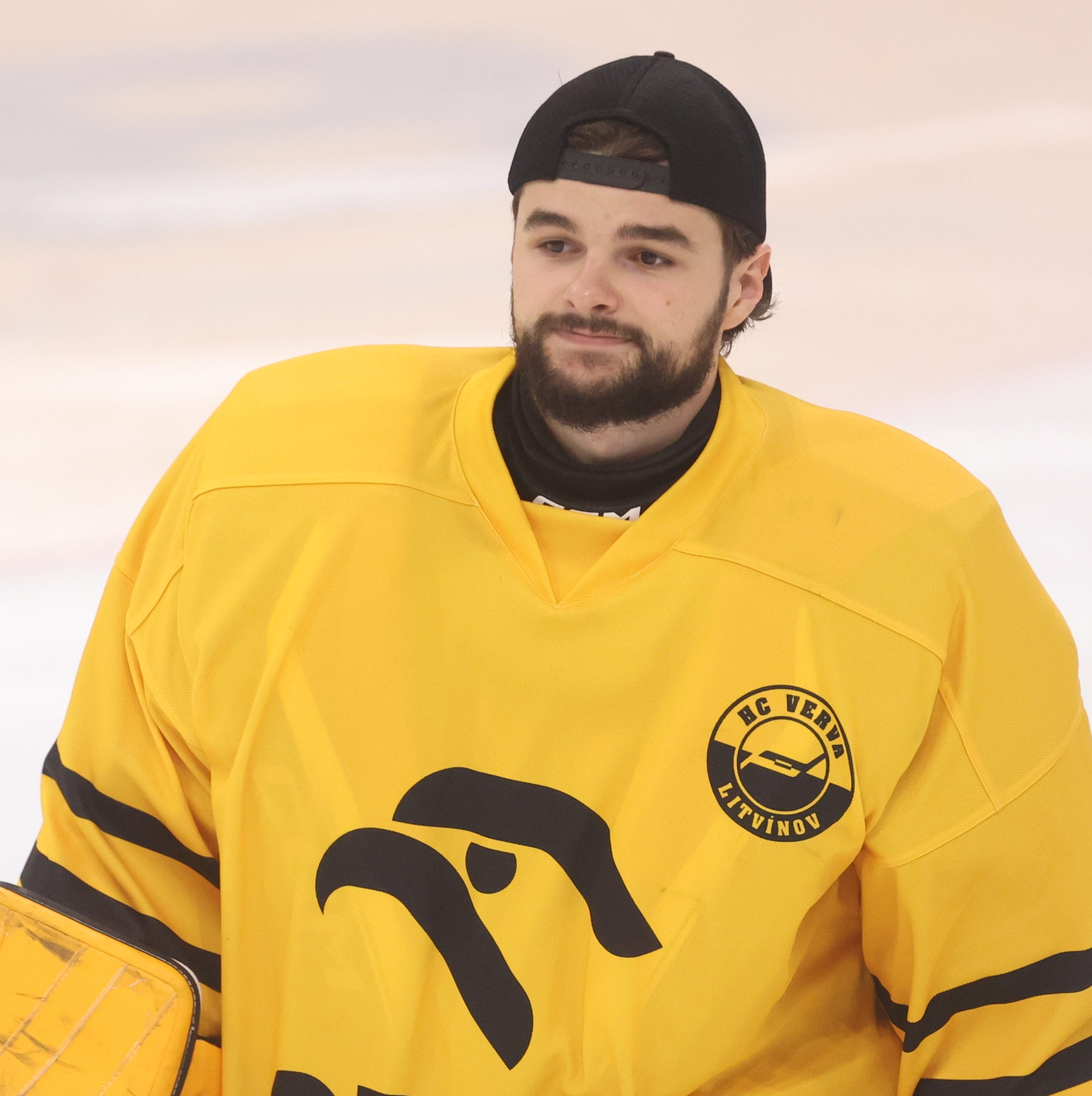
- Zajíček with HC Litvínov in 2024
- Born: 25 June 2001 (age 25) Frýdlant, Czech Republic
- Height: 6 ft 2 in (188 cm)
- Weight: 187 lb (85 kg; 13 st 5 lb)
- Position: Goaltender
- Catches: Left
- NHL team (P) Cur. team Former teams: Boston Bruins; Providence Bruins (AHL); HC Litvínov
- NHL draft: Undrafted
- Playing career: 2019–present

Šimon Zajíček (born 25 June 2001) is a Czech professional ice hockey goaltender who is currently playing with the Providence Bruins in the American Hockey League (AHL) while under contract with the Boston Bruins of the National Hockey League (NHL). He has previously played professionally in the Czech Republic, most notably with HC Litvínov of the Czech Extraliga (ELH).

== Playing career ==
=== Czech Republic ===
Zajíček started his professional career in 2019, appearing in one game for HC Litvínov in relief of Jaroslav Janus, earning the victory. Over the next four seasons, Zajíček would bounce between different levels of the Czech leagues, always on loan from Litvínov. Throughout this period, he found himself playing for HC Stadion Litoměřice, SK Trhači Kadaň, HC Slovan Ústí nad Labem, HC Baník Sokolov, and HC Slavia Praha of the 1st Czech Republic Hockey League, as well as SK Draci Bílina and Mostečtí Lvi of the 2nd Czech Republic Hockey League.

In the 2024–25 season, Zajíček was finally able to play a season with Litvínov without having to go on loan, and the stability brought him success. In 29 games, Zajíček recorded career highs in both save percentage (SV%) and goals against average (GAA), with .930 and 2.12 respectively. His save percentage was a league best, and his GAA was good for fourth-best in the Extraliga. He also tied for second in the league with five shutouts. He would help Litvínov into the playoffs, where he would start the first three games of Litvínov's first round series against HC Oceláři Třinec. However, after going down 2–1 in the series, Zajíček was not chosen to start Game 4. Třinec would win Game 4, putting an early end to the season for Zajíček and Litvínov.

=== Boston Bruins ===
On 19 May 2025, it was announced that Zajíček would make the jump to North America, as he signed a one-year, entry-level contract worth $872,000 with the Boston Bruins.

In his first year in North America, Zajíček was assigned to the Bruins American Hockey League (AHL) affiliate, the Providence Bruins, where he formed a tandem with the eventual league MVP, Michael DiPietro, serving as his backup. Zajíček would play in 21 games with the Bruins, garnering a 14-6-1 record, and help them to the Macgregor Kilpatrick Trophy, given to the AHL team with the most regular season points. However, the Bruins would be upset in the first round of the Calder Cup playoffs, ending Zajíček's season early. Zajíček did not appear in any playoff games for Providence.

On June 23, 2026, Zajíček resigned with the Bruins on a one-year, two-way deal worth $850,000 with the Bruins.

On October 10, 2026, Zajíček was credited with a goalie goal in a game against the Charlotte Checkers. Although he did not shoot the puck, Zajíček was the last Providence Bruins player to touch the puck before a Checkers player accidentally sent the puck into their own empty net, thereby crediting him with the goal. He became the first Providence Bruins goalie to be credited with scoring a goal.

== Career statistics ==
Bold indicates led league

			Regular season									Playoffs
Season	Team	League	GP	W	L	T/OT	MIN	GA	SO	GAA	SV%	GP	W	L	MIN	GA	SO	GAA	SV%
2018–19	HC Litvínov U19	CZE U19	23	10	13	0	1,348	85	0	3.80	.911	6	3	3	359	18	0	3.01	—
2018–19	SK Draci Bílina	Czech3	9	3	6	0	508	45	0	5.32	—	—	—	—	—	—	—	—	—
2019–20	Mostečtí lvi	Czech3	1	0	1	0	60	6	0	6	—	—	—	—	—	—	—	—	—
2019–20	HC Stadion Litoměřice	Czech2	3	0	2	0	106	6	0	3.40	.861	—	—	—	—	—	—	—	—
2019–20	HC Litvínov	ELH	1	1	0	0	20	0	0	0.00	1.000	—	—	—	—	—	—	—	—
2020–21	HC Litvínov U20	CZE U20	7	3	4	0	423	17	0	2.41	.940	—	—	—	—	—	—	—	—
2020–21	SK Trhači Kadaň	Czech2	4	1	3	0	240	20	0	5.00	.885	—	—	—	—	—	—	—	—
2020–21	HC Litvínov	ELH	8	2	4	0	393	16	0	2.44	.899	1	0	1	40	2	0	3.00	.846
2021–22	HC Slovan Ústí nad Labem	Czech2	13	6	7	0	796	46	0	3.47	.898	—	—	—	—	—	—	—	—
2021–22	SK Trhači Kadaň	Czech2	1	0	1	0	60	3	0	3.00	.906	—	—	—	—	—	—	—	—
2021–22	HC Litvínov	ELH	6	0	5	0	298	27	0	5.44	.845	—	—	—	—	—	—	—	—
2022–23	HC Baník Sokolov	Czech2	3	1	2	0	174	8	0	2.76	.895	—	—	—	—	—	—	—	—
2022–23	HC Litvínov	ELH	26	11	13	0	1,411	62	1	2.64	.913	1	0	1	58	3	0	3.10	.870
2023-24	HC Slavia Praha	Czech2	2	0	2	0	123	6	0	2.93	0.916	—	—	—	—	—	—	—	—
2023–24	HC Litvínov	ELH	20	7	13	0	1,120	55	0	2.95	.909	2	0	1	62	3	0	2.90	.893
2024–25	HC Litvínov	ELH	29	15	13	0	1,668	59	5	2.12	**.930**	3	1	2	160	7	0	2.63	.927
2025–26	Providence Bruins	AHL	21	14	6	1	1,207	49	0	2.44	.915	—	—	—	—	—	—	—	—
ELH totals			90	36	48	0	4,910	219	6	2.68	.912	7	1	5	320	15	0	2.81	.906
AHL totals			21	14	6	1	1,207	49	0	2.44	.915	—	—	—	—	—	—	—	—
