= Massoud Nawabi =

Afghan poet and writer

Massoud Nawabi مسعود نوابی
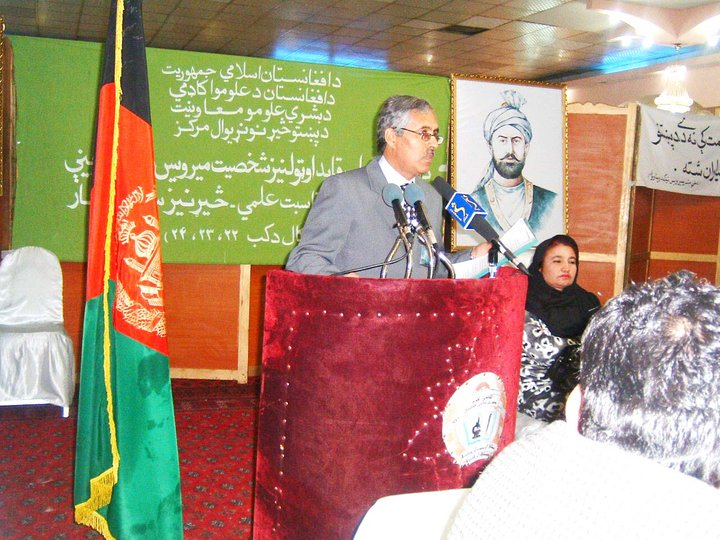
- Massoud Nawabi while delivering speech in Mir Wais Hotak's Conference, 2007
- Born: Mohammad Massoud Habib Nawabi; 1954; Shahrara, Kabul, Afghanistan
- Died: 2 January 2010 (aged 56); Islamabad, Pakistan
- Occupations: Afghan poet, writer, director, cultural personality
- Children: 2 sons: Jamshed and Hakan Massoud Navabi
- Relatives: Ghulam Habib Nawabi (father)
- Writing career
- Years active: 1970–2010
- Website: Official website

Massoud Nawabi (1954 – 2 January 2010; Persian: مسعود نوابی-; alternative spellings: Masood Nawabi) also known as Ustad Nawabi, was an Afghan poet, writer, and founder of the Educational Committee for Afghan Refugees (ECAR), Afghan Cultural Center, Ghulam Habib Nawabi, Chief Administrator of the Afghan Ibn-e-Sina University and principal of Ariana Mahajir High School. Massoud Nawabi was the Son of Ghulam Habib Nawabi, who was the last of the great Persian Poet and among the first to introduce modern Dari poetry to Afghanistan.

== Literary, cultural and personal life ==
Massoud Nawabi born to an intellectual and educated family in Kabul Afghanistan. He was well known for his literary criticism and his cultural works. He had hundreds of students, many are now themselves poets and writers. He wrote many topics, contents and published magazines like Beenish (بينش), Pohyesh (پويش) and Dewah (ديوه) on literary criticism in Persian Dari. He also initiated and edited several literary journals.

Nawabi was one of the initial script writers and feature writers for some Afghan-based drama serials and Afghan Films like Samarqand and Tabloye Khanavade. He left a record of thousands of articles for different magazines, newspapers, websites, Afghan films and dramas and for the Ministry of Information and Culture of Afghanistan.

Massoud Nawabi wrote more than 45 books. His most famous book, Keshtzar Zahfaran, was published in 3000 copies by Al-Azhar prints and Publications in Peshawar. As of June 2010, more than one million copies have been published and marketed around Afghanistan, Iran and Pakistan. He also published and launched around 38 books by his father, Ghulam Habib Nawabi.

== Sample of poetry ==
در انتظارت ای مه ی گلگون عذار من

چشمم به راۀ توست نگر حال زار من

شمعم که از فراق تو من آب میشوم

بی تو که رفته یی کنون از کنار من

== Books (published) ==
- Keshtzar Zahfaran (کشتزار زعفران)
- Sobh Wa Zindagi (صبح و زندگی)
- Shab Wa Shahir (شب و شاعر)
- Mirza Ghalib (مرزا غالب)

== Books (unpublished) ==
- Bahar Wa Shahir (بهار و شاعر)
- Musiqi Afghanistan (موسیقی افغانستان)
- Ali Mazhar Hama Khoobi Haa (علی مظهر همه خوبی ها)
- Gulchin Aarefaan (گلچین عارفان)
- Shahir Wa Aiyeena (شاعر و آئینه)
- Tohfa Hai Ustad (تحفه های استاد)
- Mudeer Keest? (مدیر کیست؟)
- Hind Bareen (هند برین)
- Hazrat Sarmad Shaheed (حضرت سرمد شهید)

And many more...

== Cultural centres ==
- Afghan Cultural Center
- Ghulam Habib Nawabi Cultural Center

== Schools ==
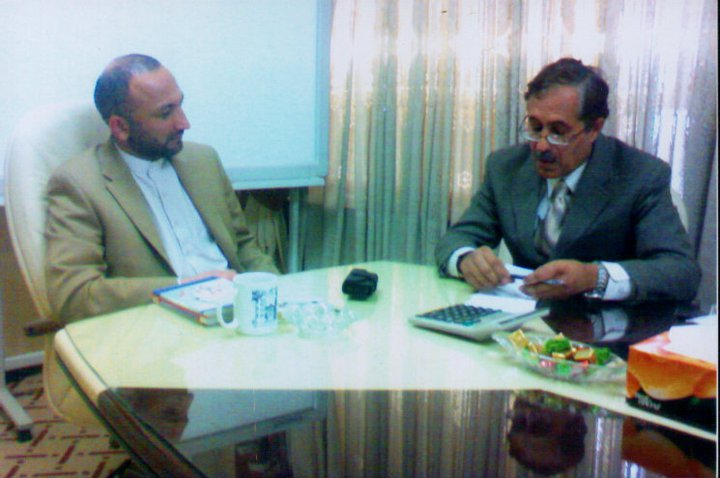
Massoud Nawabi and Afghanistan's former Minister of Education, Mohammad Hanif Atmar, 2009

- Ghulam Habib Nawabi High School (1998–2001)
- Allama Saljughi High School (1996–1998)
- Ariana Mahajir High School (1999–2009)

== Magazines ==
- Beenish (بينش)
- Pohyesh (پويش)
- Dewah (ديوه)

== Death ==
Massoud Nawabi died from a heart attack in PIMS Complex Hospital, Islamabad – Pakistan on 2 January 2010. His funeral was held on the afternoon of 3 January 2010 by many admirers, poets, writers, government officials and journalists at The 500 Family Graveyard, Kabul – Afghanistan.

== Tributes, memories and anniversaries ==
On 2 January 2011, Hakan Massoud Navabi, the elder son of Massoud Nawabi hosted Nawabi's first death anniversary at the Community Center in the capital city of Pakistan, Islamabad.

Poets, writers and authors, teachers, high-ranked officials, diplomats from the Embassy of Afghanistan and students were gathered from different cities including Islamabad, Peshawar, Kabul and Herat to attend his first death anniversary.
