= Musa Hakan Asyalı =

Turkish scientist

- Born: 10 February 1969 (age 57); Ankara, Turkey
- Known for: Biomedical
- Scientific career
- Fields: Engineering

Musa Hakan Asyalı (born 10 February 1969) is a Turkish scientist and professor of biomedical engineering. Formerly the dean of engineering at Zirve University, he became the rector of Abdullah Gül University in 2010, and resigned in 2012. After resigning, he worked at Yıldız Technical University until 2016.

Asyalı graduated from Bilkent University in 1990, and completed a doctorate in biomedical engineering at the University of Southern California in 1998. Before coming to Zirve University, he worked at Ege University, Yaşar University, and Erciyes University. His research specialty is the statistical design of biological experiments.

== Most cited publications ==
- MM Shoukri, MH Asyalı, A Donner (2004) "Sample size requirements for the design of reliability study: review and new results" "Statistical Methods in Medical Research" 13 (4), 251–271 According to Google Scholar, this article has been cited 325 times
- B Yılmaz, MH Asyalı, E Arıkan, S Yetkin, F Özgen (2010) "Sleep stage and obstructive apneaic epoch classification using single-lead ECG" - Biomedical engineering online, 9(1) 39. According to Google Scholar, this article has been cited 163 times
- MH Asyalı, D Çolak, O Demirkaya, MS Inan -(2016) Gene expression profile classification: a review Current Bioinformatics, 1 (1), 55-73 According to Google Scholar, this article has been cited 161 times
- O Demirkaya, MH Asyalı, PK Sahoo (2008) Image processing with MATLAB: applications in medicine and biology CRC Press. According to Google Scholar, this article has been cited 155 times
