= Haakon VII's gate =

Street in Trondheim, Norway

Coordinates: 63.441°N 10.455°E

Haakon VII's gate is a street in the Norwegian city of Trondheim. Running mostly through the neighborhood of Lade, it serves several large shopping centers, such as City Lade, Lade Arena and Lefdal. On the northeastern side lies the sports facility Lade Anlegget. It is named for King Haakon VII of Norway (1872–1957), who reigned in Norway from 1905 to 1957. From 1940 to 1965, the area around the street was Trondheim Airport, Lade.
