= Lade Arena Shopping Mall =

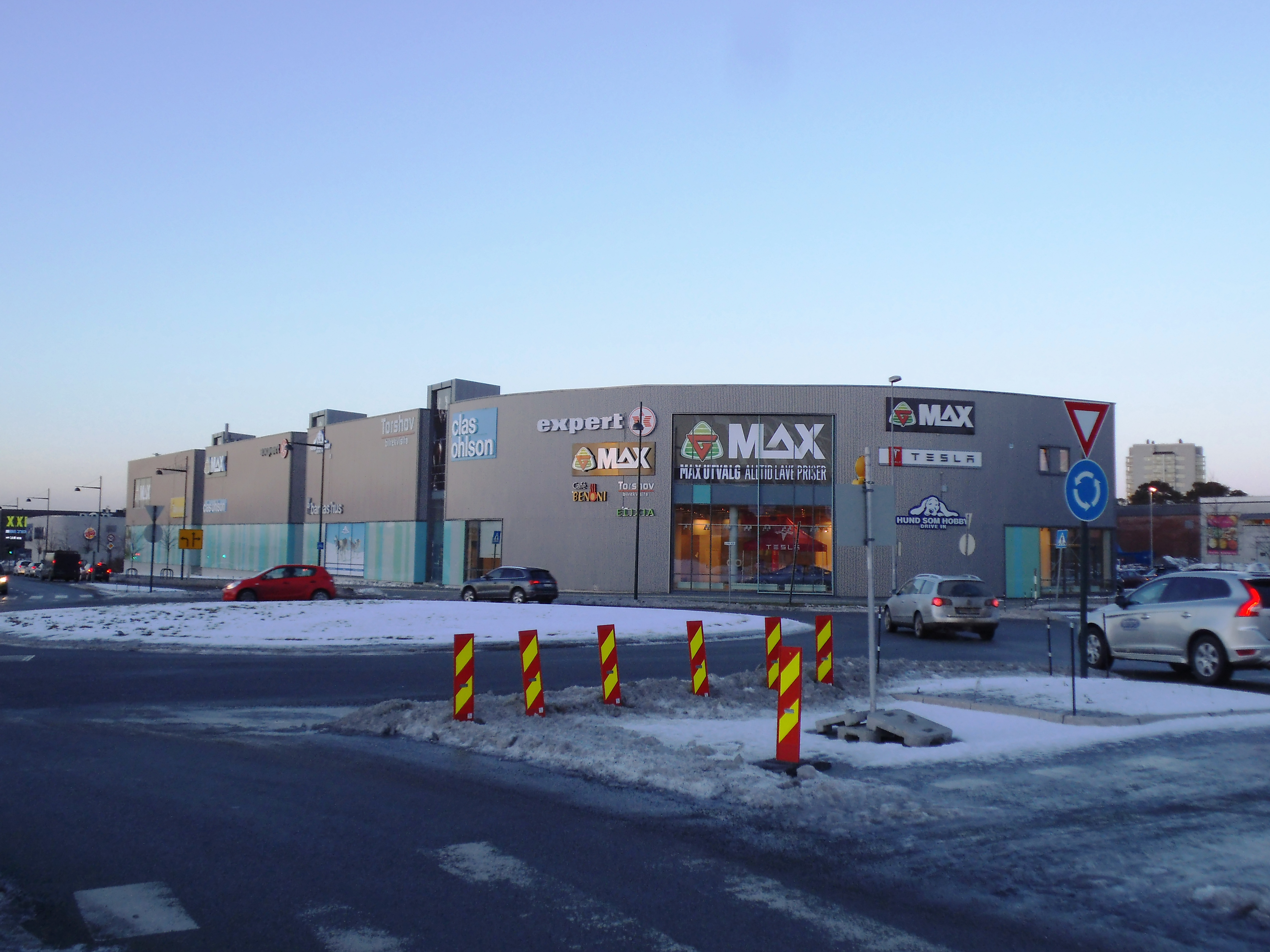
- Lade Arena Mall in 2015
- Location: Trondheim, Norway
- Coordinates: 63.441126°N 10.461626°E
- Address: Haakon VIIS gate 12 7041; Trondheim, Norway; K2B 8C1
- Opened: 2007
- Manager: Odd Magne Basmo
- Architect: Kjersti Hilde ARC Arkitekter
- Num. of stores: 30
- Floor area: 52,000 sq ft (4,831.0 m^{2})
- Floors: 2
- Parking: 777 spaces
- Public transit: Metro bus
- Website: Lade Arena Shopping Mall Website

Lade Arena Shopping Mall consists of 30 stores and is one of three shopping malls in Lade, Trondheim. The mall consists of three buildings and a smaller office building. Lade Arena was originally opened in November 2007 with two floors. In 2011 Lade Arena 2 was added to the existing mall. There is an underground parking structure.

== History ==
The owner of the Lade Arena Shopping Mall from 2007–2016 was NHP Eiendom and DNB Livsforsikring. The mall consists of four buildings and was constructed in two phases. In 2013 KLP Eiendom made an offer to purchase the mall for 925 million krone, but the deal was never completed. In 2016 DNB Liv became the sole owner of the property when the partnership was dissolved.

Lade Arena has 777 parking spaces and an underground parking garage. The mall is also accessible by bicycle via paved bicycle paths which were built in 2014.

== Expansion 2011 ==
Lade Arena 2 was added in 2012 at a cost of 220 million krone. The new building added 30,000 sq ft (2,800 m^{2}) bringing the mall's total floor space to 52,000 sq ft (4,800 m^{2}). The new addition was opened in November 2011. Multiconsult was hired to help with design when the mall was expanded and a Lade Arena 2 was added to Lade Arena 1. The mall now has 30 stores.

== Lade Arena's tenants ==
The stores in the mall are related to sports, children, automobile, dogs, personal care, a fitness center and restaurants. There is also a Tesla dealer located at Lade Arena.

== See also ==
- Trondheim Shopping
