= Haukur =

- Gender: Male

Origin
- Language: Old Norse
- Origin: Haukr
- Meaning: Hawk
- Region of origin: Iceland

Haukur [ˈhœyːkʏr̥] is an Icelandic masculine given name and may refer to:

- Haukur Angantýsson (1948–2012), Icelandic chess Master
- Haukur Ingi Guðnason (born 1978) Icelandic footballer
- Haukur Jón Gunnarsson (born 1949), Icelandic theatre instructor and director
- Haukur Halldórsson, (1937–2024), Icelandic artist
- Haukur Páll Sigurðsson (born 1987), Icelandic international footballer
- Haukur Tómasson (born 1960), Icelandic composer

As a middle name:

- Ólafur Haukur Símonarson (born 1947) Icelandic playwright and novelist
- Bjarni Haukur Thorsson (born 1971), Icelandic director, writer, producer, and actor
