= Hakan Sürsal =

Turkish poet

Hakan Sürsal (born 12 July 1963 in Ankara) is a Turkish poet.

== Biography ==
Turkish writer of short stories, novels, essays, and poetry. Hakan Sürsal graduated from the Geology Department of Istanbul University in Istanbul. Politics, history, and philosophy are the main sources of Sürsal's books.

Hakan Sürsal, his own fiction in the language of the new breath of contemporary Turkish literature.

== Bibliography ==
- station/soot bowl direction (is'tas'yön) - poetry
- asexual Rodin (eşeysiz Rodin) - poetry
- dark room smiles (karanlıkoda gülücükleri) - poetry
- cigarettes and crows (sigaralar ve kargalar) - short stories
- the blue infirmary (mavi revir) - poetry
- sound, soup and fresh bread (ses,çorba ve taze ekmek) - poetry
- the joke (şaka) - essay
- bird tip (kuş ucu) - poetry
- take me to the old plane tree (beni yaşlı çınar'a götür) - novel
- browse gaps (göz boşlukları) - short stories / essay
- elephant with flowers (çiçekli fil) - poetry
- paper child (kâğıt çocuk) - novel
- raves about dying" (ölmek hakkında övgüler) - short stories
