= Haakon of Sweden (disambiguation) =

Haakon VI (1340–1380) was King of Norway in 1343–1380 and King of Sweden in 1362–1364.

Haakon of Sweden (Swedish: Håkan) may also refer to:

- Haki, mythological Scandinavian sea-king
- Håkan the Red, King of Sweden in the late 11th century
