= Hakan Massoud Navabi =

Hakan Nawabi
- هاکان نوابی
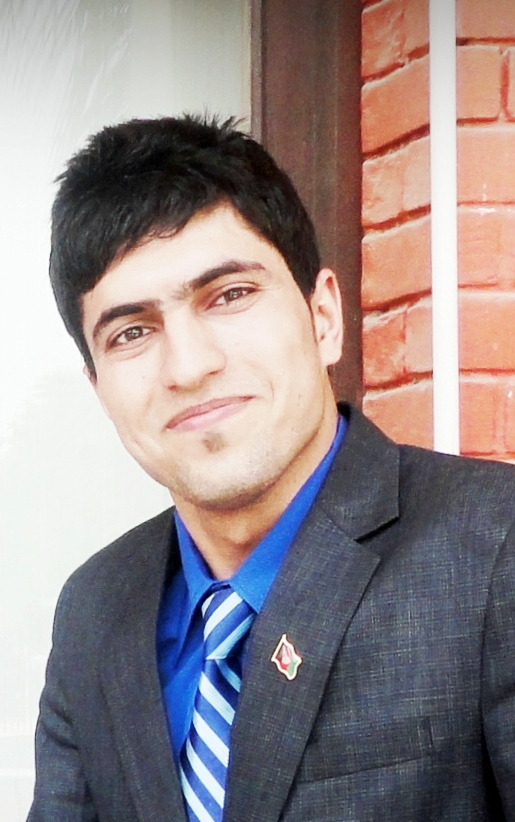
- Hakan at the Embassy of the Islamic Republic of Afghanistan in New Delhi - India; 2012
- Born: Hakan Nawabi; July 31, 1990 (age 36); Kabul, Afghanistan
- Education: Journalism, India
- Occupations: Writer-author, Freelance Journalist, Entrepreneur
- Spouse: Arezo Nawabi (m. 2012)
- Relatives: Massoud Nawabi (father)
- Writing career
- Language: English, Persian, Dari,
- Years active: 2009 – present
- Notable awards: UNHCR's Best Speech Award, 2004, Best Story Award, 2001. Awards of Excellence from Embassy of Afghanistan, 2012 and 2014.
- Website: hakanmassoudnavabi.blogspot.in

Hakan Nawabi (Persian: هاکان نوابی, born July 31, 1990) is an Afghan-Canadian freelance journalist, writer, entrepreneur and blogger. Previously served as Press Officer, Protocol Officer and Executive Assistant for the Embassy of Afghanistan in New Delhi, India from August 2011 to December 2014. He is well known for his number of quotations on peace, stability, unity, love and friendship. Nawabi is the son of Afghan well-known poet, writer, school principal and cultural personality; Massoud Nawabi who have been listed as the most prominent cultural personality at the history of Afghanistan in 2011 and is the grand son of Ghulam Habib Nawabi, who was the last of the great Dari Poet and among the first to introduce modern Dari poetry in Afghanistan.

== Early life and background ==
Hakan was born on July 31 in Kabul, Afghanistan, the elder of two children. His father Massoud Nawabi, was a poet, writer, school principal, cultural personality and a well known public figure. He spent early years of his childhood and middle class of school in Kabul. In 1996 Hakan and his family moved to Pakistan where his father established a school; Ghulam Habib Nawabi and the Educational Committee for Afghan Refugees (ECAR) in Islamabad. On January 2, 2010, when Hakan was 20 years old, his father passed away in result of a sudden heart failure in Islamabad, Pakistan. Shortly after, in 2011 after a year of working as an interpreter, anchor and news analyst to a private telecommunication company called IBEX Groups, in Islamabad, he moved to India with his mother and younger brother, Jamshed.

== Influences ==
Navabi has written in Dari and English dailies, magazines, blogs, websites as a ‘freelance feature writer’ apart from working on different designations in different cities of South Asian countries such as Kabul, Islamabad, New Delhi, and Canada.

He als engaged in a diplomatic mission at the Embassy of the Islamic Republic of Afghanistan in New Delhi, India.

== Selected quote ==
It doesn't matter from which ethnicity you belong to; but always be like bounded body and never let anyone suffer in pain. Lets throw hate away. Lets all think for just five minutes; what will happen if we are disunited and United?!
