= Håkan Jörgensen =

Håkan Jörgensen, author and freelance journalist, was born 1969 and grew up in Asmundtorp outside Landskrona, Sweden. In the 1990s he worked as a diving instructor in several countries. After studies at the Swedish School of Sport and Health Sciences and Stockholm University, he worked as an orthopedic technician to Gå & Löpkliniken for five years before he took the leap into journalism full-time after having freelanced for several years as a sideline.

Jörgensen writes mainly articles about health and travel for various media. He is the author of the following books:

- Säker dykning (Safe Diving)
- Gå Jogga Löp
- Hitta din balans (Finding Your Balance)
- Jämvikt och balans (Equilibrium and Balance)
- Ny succémetod
- Stretcha dig i form (Stretch Yourself Into Shape)
- Spa för kropp & själ (Spa for Body and Soul)

== Sources ==
- www.fitnessforlaget.se
- www.halsoforlaget.se
