= Hakon Jarl (Smetana) =

Symphonic poem by Bedřich Smetana

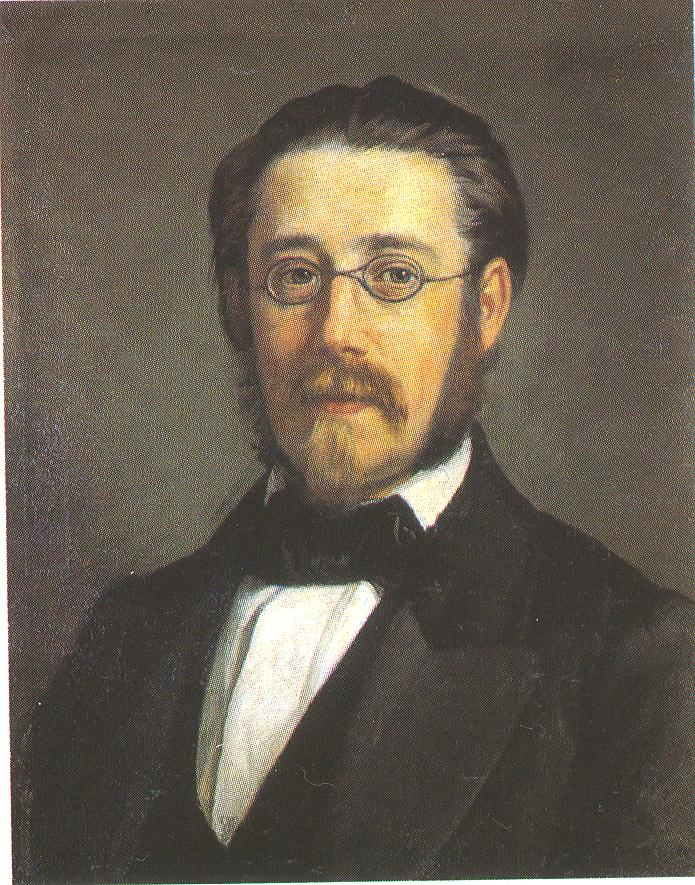
Portrait of Bedřich Smetana painted in 1858, two years before he composed Hakon Jarl. The portrait is by the Swedish artist Per Södermark

Hakon Jarl (Op. 16) is a symphonic poem in C minor composed by Bedřich Smetana between 1860 and 1861. It is based on the historical tragedy of the same name by the Danish poet and playwright Adam Oehlenschläger. The play's protagonist and namesake is Håkon Jarl who ruled Norway in the late 10th century.

== Background and performance history ==
Hakon Jarl is the third and last of Smetana's so-called "Swedish" symphonic poems, composed during the years he spent in Gothenburg (1857–1861). His visit to Franz Liszt at Weimar in the summer of 1857, where he heard Liszt's Faust Symphony and Die Ideale, caused a material reorientation of Smetana's orchestral music and suggested to him a means for expressing literary subjects by a synthesis between music and text, rather than by simple musical illustration. These insights are reflected in Hakon Jarl and the first two symphonic poems he wrote in Gothenburg: Richard III (1858), and Wallenstein's Camp (1859).

The subject matter of Hakon Jarl, which was based on Oehlenschläger's 1804 play about a legendary Norse ruler and the triumph of Christianity over paganism in Scandinavia, was possibly chosen to appeal to Smetana's intended audience in Gothenburg. However, according to musicologist Richard Taruskin, the work's poetic and musical themes show no particular Scandinavian colour and are "universally heroic and religious" in nature. In the end, Hakon Jarl and Smetana's previous two symphonic poems premiered in his Czech homeland instead of Sweden.

Smetana finished the first sketch of Hakon Jarl on 6 January 1860 and completed the work on 24 March 1861. Shortly thereafter he returned permanently to Prague where it was performed for the first time on 24 February 1864. Although not as well known as Smetana's later symphonic poem cycle Má vlast, the three "Swedish" symphonic poems are still regularly performed in concert halls.

== Recordings ==
Hakon Jarl (along with Richard III and Wallenstein's Camp) was recorded in 2007 for Chandos Records by the BBC Philharmonic Orchestra conducted by Gianandrea Noseda. Among its previous recordings are those by Rafael Kubelik and Vladimir Valek.
