= Håkon Tysdal =

Norwegian writer (1947–2019)

Håkon Tysdal (17 February 1947 - 30 September 2019) was a Norwegian writer from Enebakk in Akershus. He lived in Rælingen. He was editor of det lokalhistoriske tidsskriftet IGN and wrote many local history articles and books.

== Bibliography ==
- Hans Borgen. Historien om bonden, politikeren og organisasjonsmannen. Saeculum forlaget. Biography. 2015
- Følge pengene. Kolofon forlag. Novel. 2014
- Etter freden. Kolofon forlag. Novel. 2013
- Arbeidsplassene som forsvant.(m. Andreas Bøhler og Amund Ruud). Enebakk historielag. 2012
- Det går på skinner - da dampen tok over for gampen. (m. Odd Kjell Sjegstad). Flisbyn forlag. 2012
- Avdukingen. Kolofon forlag. Novel. 2012
- Dagny og Dan. Kolofon forlag. Novel. 2011
- Næringslivet på 1950-tallet: Skedsmo, Lørenskog og Rælingen.(Red.) Flisbyn forlag. 2010
- Romerike mens nasjonen våkner 1750-1850.(Red. m/ fler). Årbok for Romerike historielag. 2009
- Fra Ign til Fontana Di Trevi - en reise gjennom Ragnhild Jølsens siste leveår. Enebakk historielag 2008.
- Dampskipet Strømmen og livet på Øyeren (flere forfattere). Flisbyn Forlag 2006.
- Romerike i barokk og rokokko: 1600 - 1700-tallet (ed.). Årbok for Romerike historielag 2005.
- Bedre medieomtale (w. Odd Kjell Skjegstad). Odd Forlag 2003.
- Ordbok for tannteknikere og tannhelsesekretærer (w. Roald Arne Larby). 1991.
- Informasjonsvirksomhet (w. Odd Kjell Skjegstad). 1990.
