= Current Bioinformatics =

- Discipline: Computational biology
- Language: English
- Edited by: Quan Zou

Publication details
- History: 2006–present
- Publisher: Bentham Science Publishers
- Impact factor: 2.068 (2019)

Standard abbreviations
- ISO 4: Curr. Bioinform.

Indexing
- CODEN: CB
- ISSN: 1574-8936
- OCLC no.: 71284566

Links
- Journal homepage; Journal page at publisher's website

Current Bioinformatics is a peer-reviewed open access scientific journal, published by Bentham Science Publishers, covering areas such as such as computing in biomedicine and genomics, computational proteomics and systems biology, and metabolic pathway engineering.

== Abstracting and indexing ==
The journal is abstracted and indexed in Scopus, Biological Abstracts, BIOSIS, BIOSIS Previews, EMBASE, ProQuest, EMBiology, Genamics, JournalSeek, MediaFinder®-Standard Periodical Directory, PubsHub, J-Gate, CNKI Scholar, Suweco CZ, EBSCO and Chemical Abstracts Service.
