= Yakun =

Varangian leader

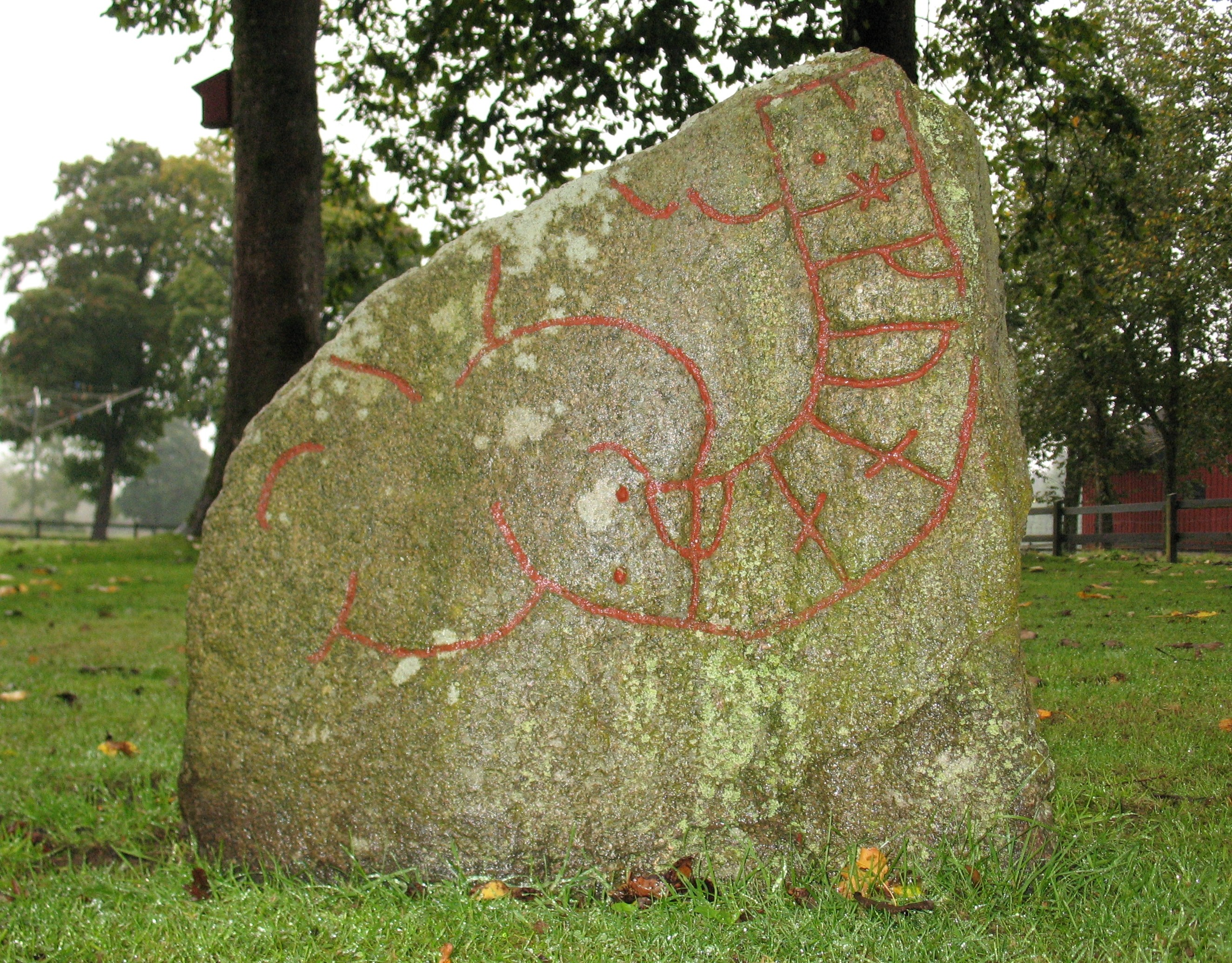
The Komstad Runestone mentions a Hákon Jarl who is identified with the Norwegian commander Håkon Eiriksson and who may have been Yakun.

Yakun or Jakun (Old Norse: Hákon), nicknamed the Blind (Russian: Якун Слепой), was a Varangian (Viking) leader who is mentioned in the Primary Chronicle and in the Kiev Pechersk Lavra. The chronicle tells that he arrived in Kievan Rus' in the year 1024 and fought in the Battle of Listven between the half-brothers Yaroslav I the Wise and Mstislav of Chernigov.

According to Gudmund Jöran Adlerbeth of the Swedish Academy (1802), Yakun was identical with King Anund Jacob. Alternatively, the name Yakun could correspond to someone named Håkan, unknown in the history of the era.

== Account ==
Yaroslav had arrived in Novgorod and sent a request to Scandinavia that he needed Norse warriors. Yakun arrived as the leader of the Varangians and he was dressed in a robe that was woven with gold. In the autumn of 1024, Yaroslav and Yakun marched with their forces to Chernigov, but Mstislav had been informed of their approach and met them at Listven.

In the evening, when the battle took place, a thunderstorm appeared with rain that fell on the combatants. Mstislav had put his own retinue on the flanks, while he had positioned the Severians in the centre to engage with the Varangians. Mstislav ordered the Severians to attack and after a while the Varangians had exhausted themselves by fighting against the Severians. Seeing that the Vikings had become tired, Mstislav ordered his own troops to attack them as well.

In the darkness of the thunderstorm, it was only when the lightning flared that they could see their own swords, and so they accidentally killed their own. After a while Yaroslav saw that his army was overpowered and he ordered retreat. Yakun lost his golden robe during the departure.

Yaroslav returned to Novgorod, while Yakun returned overseas and he died there. Mstislav observed the many dead Severians and Varangians, and was happy that no one in his own retinue had fallen.

== Blind or handsome ==
In the Primary Chronicle, Yakun is described as slěpъ which has been interpreted as either sь lěpъ meaning "the handsome one" or sьlěpъ which means "blind". Omeljan Pritsak notes that it is difficult to imagine a blind Viking commander although there have been blind generals in history, such as the Venetian doge Enrico Dandolo. He also argues that a blind Viking commander during the 11th century would have been remembered in Scandinavian sources.

== Scandinavian sources ==
Although old Russian sources often mention that the rulers of Kievan Rus' requested warriors from Scandinavia, Yakun is the only commander who is mentioned by name. However, his identification is rendered difficult by the fact that Old Russian sources and Old Norse sources rarely agree, as in the case of the Swedish princesses who married Yaroslav and Mstislav, where Russian sources give no hints of their origins.

In Sweden, there are two runic inscriptions that mention a jarl named Hákon, U 617 and Sm 76, but scholars disagree on whether the two runestones refer to the same person and who they were. All known Hakon Jarls have been involved in the debate: Hákon Sigurðarson (d. 995), his grandson Hákon Eiríksson (d. 1029), Hákon Ívarsson (d. 1062) and Hákon Pálsson (d. 1122). The most common view among runologists (Brate, von Friesen, Wessén, Jansson, Kinander and Ruprecht) is that the two stones refer to different Hakon Jarls and that U 617 refers to a Swede and that Sm 76 refers to the Norwegian Hákon Eiríksson together with U 16.

Based on the interpretation that Yakun was handsome, Pritsak identifies him as the Norwegian jarl Håkon Eiriksson whose family is said to have been unusually handsome in Snorri Sturluson's Haralds saga Sigurðarsonar ch 40-41. Moreover, the fact that Håkon Eiriksson belonged to a royal dynasty would explain why the Primary Chronicle mentioned him as a king and an equal to Yaroslav. Additionally, in Austrfaravísur (strophe 19) it is reported that when the skald Sigvatr Þórðarson arrived in Sweden in 1023, he learned of "treason" in Kievan Rus' (probably in respect to Olaf II of Norway) which would have been done by a man of Eiríkr Hákonarson's family. Eirík had been banished from Norway by Olaf II of Norway in 1014. Other sources show that he was earl in Mercia, England in the interval from 1019 to his return to Norway in 1028.

== Family ==
In the Kiev Pechersk Lavra there is a collection of stories of saints and one of them tells of the Varangian Šimon (Sigmundr) who was the son of the Varangian lord Afrikan (Alfrekr). The latter was the brother of Yakun and after Afrikan's death Yakun banished Šimon from his kingdom and he lived the rest of his life in exile in Kievan Rus' serving both Yaroslav and his son.

== Bibliography ==
- "Якун Слепой" . Brockhaus and Efron Encyclopedic Dictionary (in Russian). 1906.
- Pritsak, O. (1981). The origin of Rus'. Cambridge, Mass.: Distributed by Harvard University Press for the Harvard Ukrainian Research Institute.
- Androshchuk, F. "Kristna nordbor i Rus / Scandinavian Christians in Rus", in Berg, K. & Olsson, O. (eds.): Historiska Nyheter – Olga & Ingegerd. Statens historiska museum 2004-2005. p. 44.
