= Metropolis of Kiev (Patriarchate of Moscow) =

Orthodox diocese

The Metropolis of Kiev is a metropolis of the Eastern Orthodox Church that was transferred to the Patriarchate of Moscow in 1685. From 988 AD until 1596 AD, the mother church of the Metropolis of Kiev, Galicia and all Rus' had been the Ecumenical Patriarchate of Constantinople. The Moscow Patriarchate was a Caesaropapist entity that was under the control of the Russian state. While nominally ruled by a metropolitan bishop, since its inception, the secular authorities of the Tsardom of Russia altered the territorial remit of the Kyiv metropolis, stripped it of its suffragan sees and transformed the office from an ecclesiastical province to an archbishopric to an honorific or empty title.

Following the Russian Revolution, it became an exarchate of the Russian Orthodox Church (ROC). Following the collapse of the Soviet Union, it was transformed into the Ukrainian Orthodox Church of the Moscow Patriarchate (UOC-MP) with a degree of independence in the territory of the modern state of Ukraine. The primate of the UOC-MP — Onufriy — is styled the "Metropolitan of Kyiv and All Ukraine". It is a matter of debate as to whether the UOC-MP has full ecclesial independence (autocephaly) or merely enjoys extended autonomy while ultimate control continues to reside in Moscow.

It is also a matter of dispute as to whether Moscow abided by the terms of the transfer from the ecclesiastical jurisdiction of the Ecumenical Patriarchate of Constantinople: it is the contention of Constantinople and of the Orthodox Church of Ukraine (OCU) that the terms were breached and that the de facto transfer is no longer de jure or canonical; Moscow denies this claim and considers the OCU to be schismatic. According to the ROC, the 1686 Synodal Letter of the Ecumenical Patriarch gave Moscow the right to ordain the Metropolitan of Kiev. According to the Ecumenical Patriarchate, this act was firstly conditional upon Moscow preserving the traditional rights of the metropolitan and secondly did not affect the authority of Constantinople as the mother church of the metropolis. In this respect, both Constantinople and the OCU regard Moscow's subsequent actions as uncanonical. On 11 October 2018, the "Holy Synod of the Ecumenical Patriarchate" revoked the Synodal Letter (Act) of 1686. On 5 January 2019, Patriarch Bartholomew I of Constantinople signed the tomos that granted the OCU autocephaly.

== Background ==
=== Break with Constantinople ===
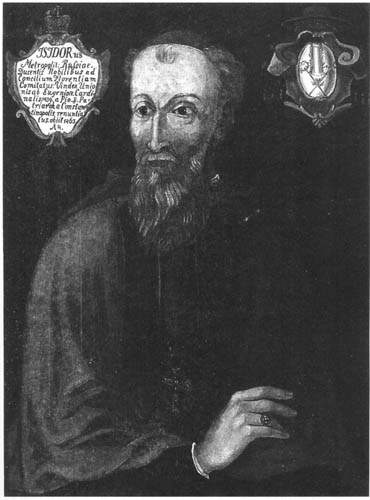
Metropolitan Isidore of Kiev

An ecumenical council of the Church — the Council of Florence — took place from 1431 to 1449. Although he resisted at first, the Grand Prince of Moscow (Note: The Grand Duchy of Moscow was a predecessor state of current state called the Russian Federation. (Sources: Russia: People and Empire, 1552–1917 by Geoffrey Hosking, Harvard University Press, 1998, ISBN 0674781198 (page 46) & Russia and The Commonwealth of Independent States 2012 by M. Wesley Shoemaker, Stryker Post, 2012, ISBN 1610488938 (page 10).)) — Vasily II of Moscow — eventually permitted the Metropolitan of Kiev and all Rus' — Isidore of Kiev — to attend the council on condition that Isidore should return with "the rights of Divine law and the constitution of the holy Church" uninjured. The council healed the Great Schism by uniting the Roman Catholic and Eastern Orthodox churches. The union was proclaimed on 6 July 1439 in the document Laetentur Caeli (Note: Sometimes also spelled as Laetentur Coeli, Laetantur Caeli, Lætentur Cæli, Lætentur Cœli, or Lætantur Cæli, and occasionally referred to as the Act of Union or "Decree of Union".) which was composed by Pope Eugene IV and signed by the Holy Roman Emperor Sigismund and all but one of the bishops present. In Moscow, the union was rejected by the Grand Prince who imprisoned Metropolitan Isidore. Having adjudged Isidore to have apostatized to Catholicism, he was deposed by a local synod and later expelled. In 1448, a council of north-eastern Russian clergy was convened in Moscow at the behest of Vasily II. They elected Jonah as the "Metropolitan of Kyiv and all Rus' without the consent of the patriarch of Constantinople. Like his immediate predecessors, he permanently resided in Moscow, and was the last Moscow-based primate of the metropolis to keep the traditional title with reference to the metropolitan city of Kiev. After 1461, the Muscovite clergy abandoned the "Kiev" title and took on the new title of "Metropolitan of Moscow and all Rus'". (Note: "...the metropolitan in Kiev bore the title "metropolitan of Kiev and All Rus’," never "metropolitan of the Rus’ Land," just as the metropolitan of Moscow bore the title "metropolitan of Moscow and All Rus’," not "metropolitan of the Rus’ Land."")

Meanwhile, in the Grand Duchy of Lithuania and the Kingdom of Poland, the rulers continued to recognise Isidore as metropolitan; Jonah was rejected and was unable to exercise any pastoral control beyond the borders of Muscovy. In 1458, while Isidore was still alive, his nephew Gregory the Bulgarian was appointed to succeed him as the Metropolitan of Kiev, Galicia and all Rus' by Patriarch Gregory III of Constantinople with the agreement of Pope Pius II. In 1469, Patriarch Dionysius I of Constantinople also gave his blessing to Gregory's appointment. Furthermore, he stated that Constantinople would not recognize any metropolitan ordained without its blessing.

=== Reconciliation with Constantinople ===
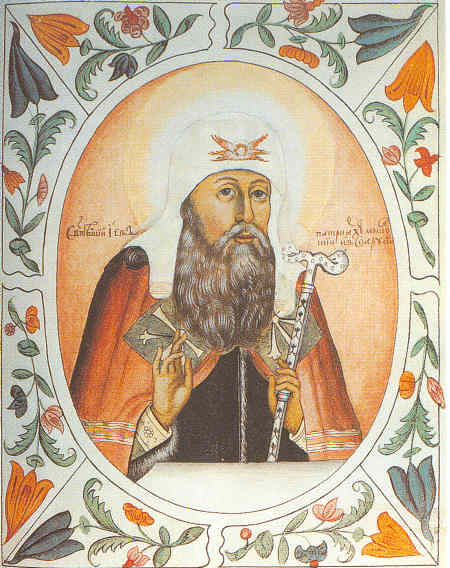
Patriarch Job of Moscow

Moscow's de facto independence (autocephaly) from Constantinople remained unrecognized; in 1587, Job of Moscow was appointed as Metropolitan of Moscow and all Rus'. He was the seventeenth to be appointed without the approval of the Ecumenical Patriarch as had been the norm. Two years later in 1589, Patriarch Jeremias II of Constantinople regularized Job's canonical status and raised him to the status of patriarch. This decision was finally confirmed by the four older patriarchs in 1593. De jure, the new patriarch's canonical territory was "all Russia and Northern countries"; (Note: In Russian: Патриарх Московский и всея России и северных стран) his effective control, however, was limited to the Tsardom of Russia.

In 1569, the Polish–Lithuanian Commonwealth was established. The Warsaw Confederation of 1573 secured the rights of minorities and religions in the new state. Within this freedom, the Orthodox bishops from their primatial seat in the city of Novogrudok, together with the faithful in the Commonwealth, chose to remain loyal to the Ecumenical Patriarchate of Constantinople .

=== Union of Brest ===
Religious situation in the Polish–Lithuanian Commonwealth in 1573

In 1588–1589, Patriarch Jeremias II of Constantinople traveled across Eastern Europe. Arriving in Moscow, he finally acknowledged the Russian Orthodox Church which had been estranged from Constantinople since the 1440s. While there, he consecrated Job of Moscow as the Eastern Orthodox Patriarch of Moscow and all Rus'. It is possible that Jeremias was imprisoned by the Ottomans and by the Muscovites, and may have been forced to elevate the see of Moscow to a patriarchy.

Travelling on to the Commonwealth, Patriarch Jeremias II deposed the Metropolitan of Kiev, Onesiphorus Divochka. With the approval of King Sigismund III, he consecrated Michael Rohoza as the new "Metropolitan of Kiev, Galicia and all Ruthenia".

In 1595–96, the majority of Eastern Orthodox hierarchs in the Ruthenian lands of the Polish–Lithuanian Commonwealth agreed to transfer their ecclesiastical jurisdiction from the Ecumenical Patriarchate of Constantinople to the jurisdiction of the Holy See. The Union of Brest as it was known, established the Ruthenian Uniate Church, which currently exists as the Ukrainian Greek Catholic Church, and the Belarusian Greek Catholic Church.

Officially, the Orthodox (but not the Eastern Catholic) Metropolis of Kiev in the Polish-Lithuanian Commonwealth was eliminated.

=== Conflicts between Muscovy, Cossacks and the Commonwealth ===
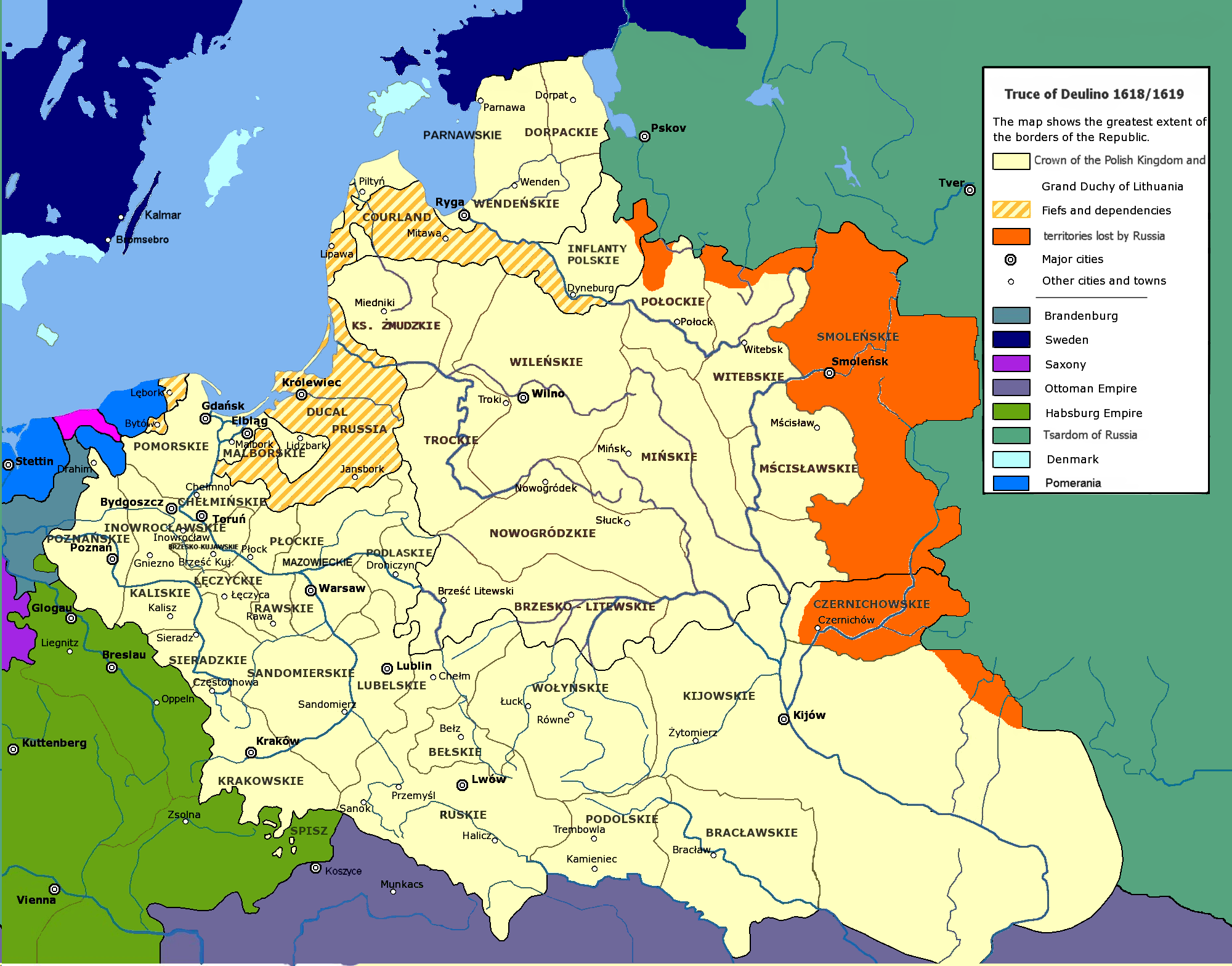
Territories in orange gained by the Commonwealth from the Truce of Deulino

By the early years of the 17th century, the Zaporozhian Cossacks had become a significant military and political force in the south-eastern region of the Commonwealth, straddling both banks of the Dnieper. Their leader (Hetman) Petro Konashevych-Sahaidachny was used by the Commonwealth leaders in their many wars with the Tsardom of Moscow. Under King Sigismund III Vasa, the hetman raided Russian territory and in 1618 laid siege to Moscow itself. To stem the growing panic, the first tsar of the Romanov dynasty — Michael of Russia — was compelled to sign the Truce of Deulino in December 1618 which resulted in the greatest territorial expansion of the Commonwealth.

By that time, the loyalty of the Zaporozhian hetmanate to the Commonwealth was only nominal. The Cossacks' strong historic allegiance to the Eastern Orthodox Church put them at odds with the Catholic-dominated Commonwealth. Tensions increased when Commonwealth policies turned from relative tolerance to the suppression of the Orthodox church, making the Cossacks strongly anti-Catholic. As a result, the Kiev and Chernihiv dioceses which lay in the hetmanate were lost to the Metropolis of Kiev, Galicia and all Rus'.

=== Establishment of the Exarchate of Ukraine ===
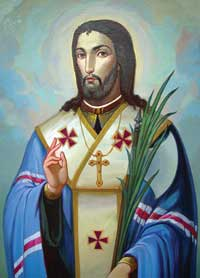
St Josaphat

The formation of the Ruthenian Uniate Church led to confrontation with those who did not conform to the union. In 1623, the hierarch Josaphat Kuntsevych was murdered. There were numerous revolts culminating in the Khmelnytsky uprising. Opponents of the union called church members "Uniates" although Catholic documents no longer use the term due to its perceived negative overtones. In August 1620, these dissenters prevailed upon Hetman Konashevych-Sahaidachny to agitate for the re-establishment of an Orthodox metropolis in the realm. The hetman persuaded Theophanes III — the Greek Orthodox Patriarch of Jerusalem — to consecrate Job Boretsky as the new "Metropolitan of Kiev, Galicia and all Rus'" and as the "Exarch of Ukraine". There were now two metropolitans with the same title but different ecclesiastical loyalties within the Commonwealth.

=== The metropolis in the Cossack Hetmanate ===
Polish-Russian War (1654–1667)

The Khmelnytsky Uprising (1648–1657), also known as the Cossack–Polish War, was a Cossack rebellion in the eastern territories of the Commonwealth, which led to the creation of a Cossack Hetmanate in right-bank Ukraine. The Treaty of Zboriv, negotiated in 1649 by Metropolitan Sylvester Kosiv, brought a temporary respite and the Orthodox Church was granted privileges. In 1654, Hetman Bohdan Khmelnytsky secured the military protection of the Tsardom of Russia in exchange for allegiance to the tsar. By the terms of the Pereiaslav Agreement, the leadership of the Cossack Hetmanate took an oath of allegiance to the Russian monarch; they were followed shortly thereafter by other officials, clergy and the inhabitants of the Hetmanate. Pursuant to the agreement, the Tsardom went to war with the Commonwealth. It quickly occupied, for a while, the lands of present Belarus, and gained some power over the Cossack Hetmanate.

=== Commonwealth of Three Nations ===
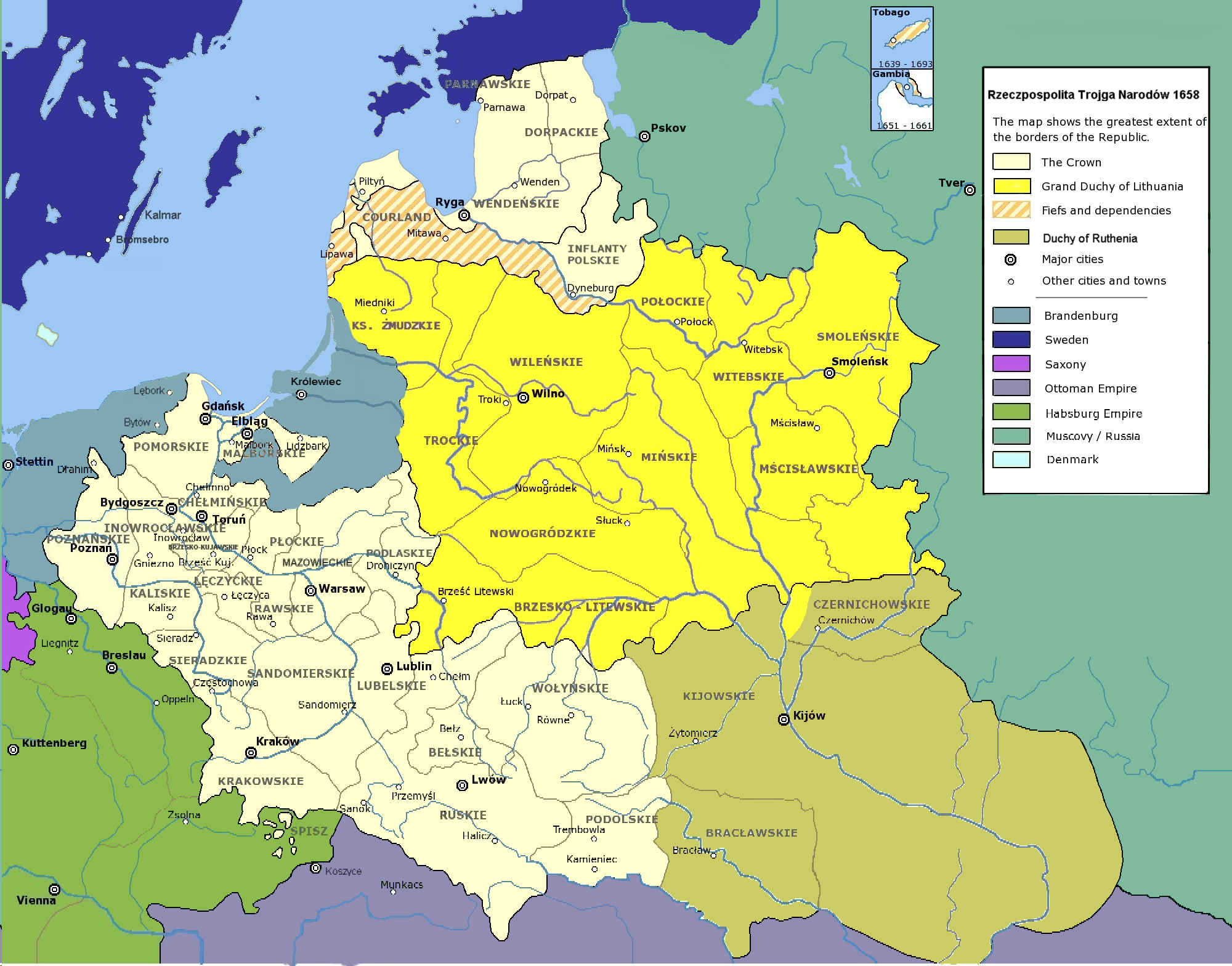
Polish–Lithuanian–Ruthenian Commonwealth as proposed by Treaty of Hadiach in 1658

The official title of Patriarch Nikon of Moscow was "Patriarch of Moscow and all Greater, Lesser, and White Russia". However, in the Commonwealth, the Metropolitan of Kiev, Galicia and all Rus' — Sylvester Kosiv — managed to defend his independence from the Moscow Patriarchate. Kosiv was succeeded by Dionysius Balaban. Metropolitan Balaban supported the pro-Polish policies of Hetman Ivan Vyhovsky and was the co-author of the Treaty of Hadiach (1658). The treaty aimed to establish a "Commonwealth of Three Nations" by transforming the Polish–Lithuanian Commonwealth into a Polish–Lithuanian–Ruthenian Commonwealth (Rzeczpospolita Trojga Narodów). It would have elevated the Cossacks and Ruthenians to a position that was equal to that of the Poles and Lithuanians in the Polish–Lithuanian union. The treaty provided that Orthodoxy should be the predominant religion in the south-eastern provinces: the Kiev Voivodeship, the Bracław Voivodeship, and the Chernihiv Voivodeship of a new Ruthenian duchy — the Grand Principality of Rus. When the idea of a Ruthenian Duchy within the Commonwealth was abandoned, the proposal collapsed. The Canadian historian Paul Robert Magocsi believes that happened because of the divisions among the Cossacks and because of the Russian invasion.

By 1686, Russia had complete sovereignty over the lands of the Zaporozhian Sich and left-bank Ukraine, as well as the city of Kiev. The Treaty of Perpetual Peace (1686) which was concluded by Russia and the Commonwealth affirmed this reality. As a result, the Greek Catholic population in those areas suffered oppression and many deaths. It also spelled an end to the independence and unity of the Hetman state. The Starodub, Chernihiv, and other territories in left-bank Ukraine went to Muscovy; the rest remained in the Commonwealth.

== Establishment ==
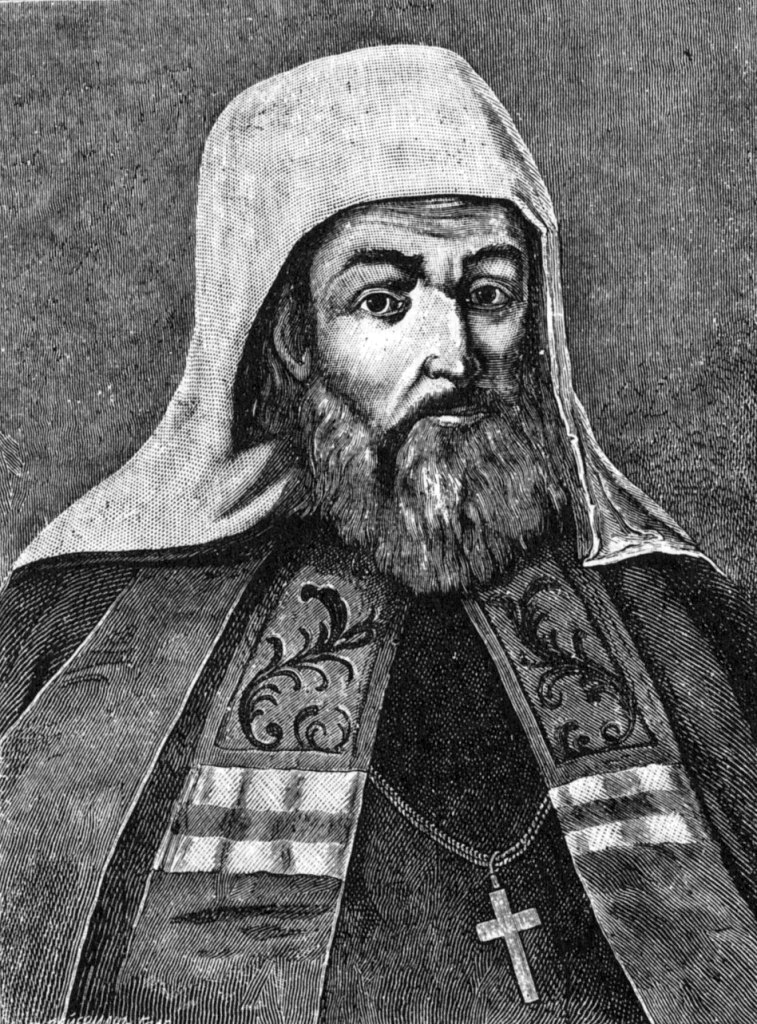
Gedeon Chetvertinsky

In 1681, the Bishop of Lviv — Yosyf Shumlyansky — secretly converted to Catholicism. He intrigued with the King of Poland — John III Sobieski — to appoint his brother Athanasius as the Bishop of Lutsk. As a result, in 1684 the king demanded that the incumbent bishop — Gedeon Chetvertinsky — accept the Union of Brest. When Gideon refused the demand, some time between July and November 1684 he moved from the Polish–Lithuanian Commonwealth to left-bank Ukraine to avoid the royal threat of imprisonment in Malbork Castle. He settled in Krupitsky which was located near Baturyn — the capital of the Cossack Hetmanate. In 1685, the Hetman of the Zaporizhian Host — Ivan Samoylovych — recommended that Gideon be appointed as the Metropolitan of Kiev, Galicia and all Rus'. He was ordained in Moscow by Patriarch Joachim of Moscow and took an oath of allegiance to the Moscow Patriarchate. It was a term of the Treaty of Perpetual Peace (signed in April 1686) that the Kievan metropolis be under the ecclesiastical jurisdiction of the Moscow patriarch. As part of this process, the patriarch forced Chetvertinsky to limit his title to "Metropolitan of Kyiv, Galicia and all Little Rus".

Shortly after the signing of the treaty, through diplomatic pressure on the Sublime Porte and through bribery of leading churchmen, the patriarch of Constantinople gave the transfer canonical recognition. The exact terms and conditions of the handover document signed by Patriarch Dionysius IV of Constantinople are disputed.

As soon as Constantinople learned of Moscow's conclusion of an "eternal peace" with the Polish-Lithuanian Commonwealth, opposition to Patriarch Dionysius grew in the Synod. He was accused of having secret ties with Moscow. In 1687, the Council of Constantinople condemned Patriarch Dionysius for the transfer of the Metropolitanate of Kiev to Moscow, assessing this act as simony and deprived Dionysius of the patriarchal throne. Thus, the action of Patriarch Dionysius was declared illegal by the council (see 2018 Moscow–Constantinople schism).

=== The metropolis under the Patriarchate of Moscow ===
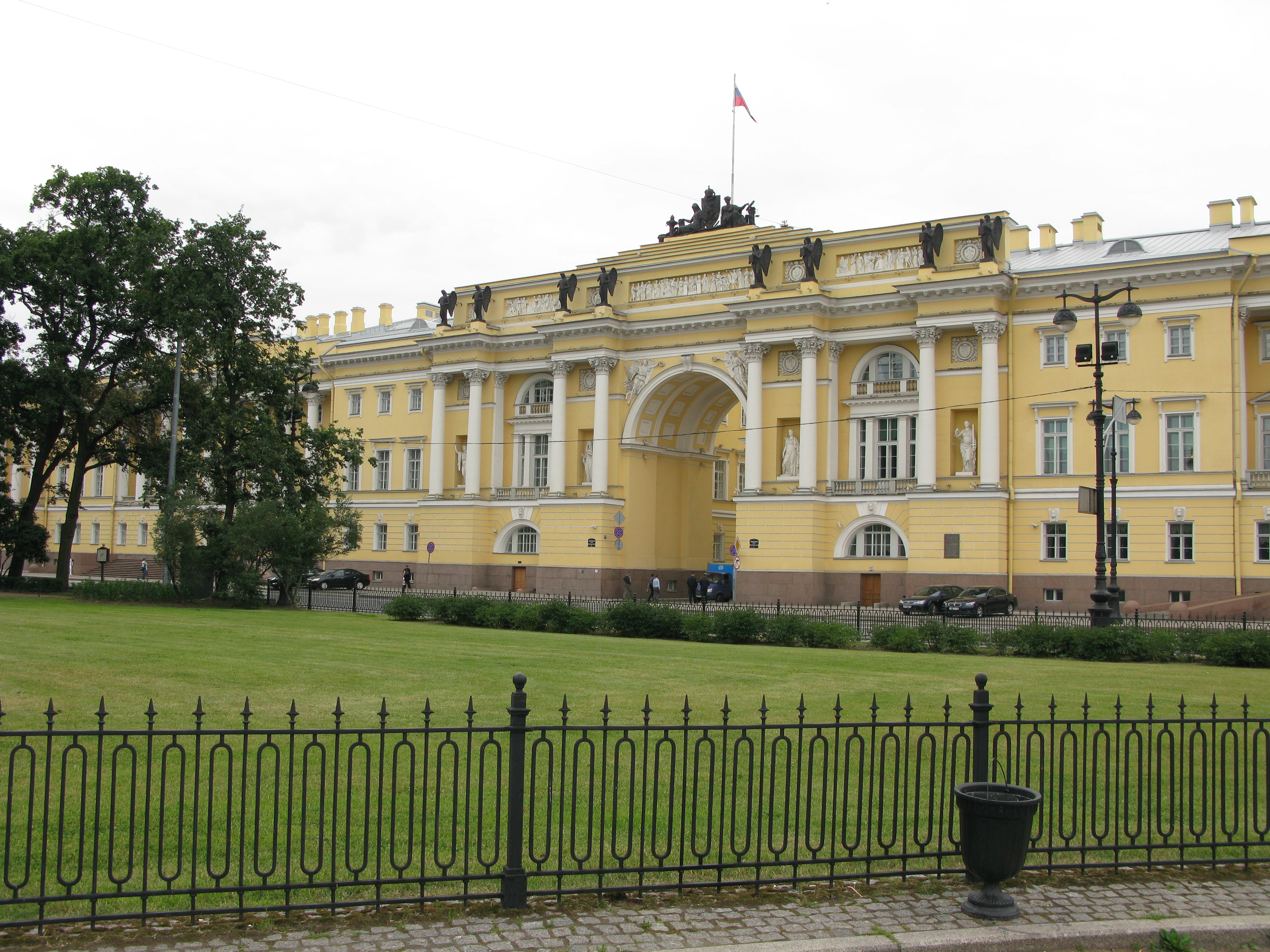
Headquarters of the Most Holy Synod of the ROC in Moscow

At the time of the transfer, the metropolis had six eparchies. Two of these were in left-bank Ukraine in the territory of the Tsardom: Kiev and Chernihiv. The remaining four were in the territory of the Commonwealth: Lviv, Lutsk, Przemyśl and Mahiliou-Mstsislau. Officially, the transfer merely replaced Constantinople with Moscow; the privileges and usages of the Church remained unchanged. However, in the following years, the title, privileges, and status of the metropolitan were greatly reduced. Of the original six eparchies that were suffragans of the metropolis, the Chernihiv eparchy was lost by 1688 while three eparchies in the territory of the Commonwealth went over to the Ruthenian Uniate Church by 1720. The Mstsislaw-Mstsislau eparchy, today in the modern state of Belarus, remained Orthodox but was under the jurisdiction of the Moscow patriarch. Only the eparchy of Kiev itself remained; it was a metropolis in name only.

Chetvertinsky's two successors (Barlaam Yasinskyi and Joasaph Krokovskyi) were elected by councils in Kiev and were ordained in Moscow. The patriarch at that time in Moscow was Adrian of Moscow who resisted the Church reform of Peter the Great. Nevertheless, Tsar Peter I got his way including the abolition of the right of the Kievan clergy to elect their metropolitan by free votes.

After Patriarch Adrian's death in 1700, Peter the Great prevented a successor from being named. The following year, on the advice of Theophan Prokopovich, Archbishop of Pskov, the Most Holy Synod was established under Archbishop Stephen Yavorsky to govern the church instead of a single primate. The Synod was no more than a department of state that was administered by a lay director — the Ober-Procurator. This usurpation of power by the civil authority continued until shortly after the Russian Revolution of 1917. In that year, a local council convened: less than half of its members were clergy; the majority were members of the laity. The council voted to restore the patriarchate. On 5 November (according to the Julian calendar), the lot fell to Tikhon.

== Disestablishment ==
In 1721, according to the "Spiritual Regulations", the Metropolitanate of Kyiv was formally liquidated as an autonomous ecclesiastical region and became an ordinary diocese of the Moscow Patriarchate.

=== Downgrading to an archeparchy ===
When the Synod appointed Varlaam Vonatovych, he was installed, not as metropolitan, but as "Archbishop of Kiev, Galicia and Little Russia". From 1722 to 1742, the ancient Church was abolished while power in the Church passed to the monarch. Instead of being the centre of a separate church, Kiev had become an eparchy of the Russian Orthodox Church.

In 1727, when the hetmanate was restored during the reign of Peter II, Barlaam Vanatovych sought the restoration of the title of metropolitan. He voiced the protests of the Ukrainian clergy against the violation of the rights and privileges of the Church. This resulted in his removal and arrest. In the same year, the Synod, contrary to the promised privileges given to the metropolitanate, appointed the Moscovite Joachim Strukov as Bishop of Pereiaslav. He was ordained in St. Petersburg, without the participation of the Metropolitan of Kyiv in his election and approval.

On 2 August 1730, the archbishop and the cathedral were summoned to Moscow, where they were all arrested, stripped of their titles, and sentenced to life in exile.

== Reestablishment with fewer privileges ==
In 1731 the tsar elevated Raphael Zaborovsky to the office of archbishop of Kiev in succession to Varlaam Vonatovych. The Kiev clergy petitioned Empress Elizabeth to renew the metropolitan's title, which she did in June 1743.

In 1748, Tymofiy Shcherbatsky was appointed the new metropolitan. The functions and rights of the metropolitan were very limited, so Timothy focused on the development of the Kyiv Academy and the restoration of the printing house at the Kyiv-Pechersk Lavra. In protest at Moscow's interference in the affairs of the metropolis, in 1757 he wrote a letter to the Synod requesting his dismissal from the metropolitan chair. Under the new metropolitan, Arseniy of Mohyla, the right of the Metropolitan of Kyiv was even more limited. In 1770, Empress Catherine the Great, through her appointees in the Synod, removed the words "and Little Rus" from the title Metropolitan of Kyiv, Galicia and Little Rus.

=== Appropriation of Church assets ===
The next step was the secularization of church wealth. At that time, the Ukrainian church owned huge estates, at the expense of which monasteries carried out extensive cultural and educational work, maintained schools, hospitals, and helped the needy. In the mid-1760s, Catherine II aimed to take away these lands, but was met with strong resistance from the clergy. However, she did not give up her plan. In the 1780s, more favorable conditions were created for the implementation of this plan, and on April 10, 1786, the empress issued a decree on the secularization of monastic and ecclesiastical lands. As a result, 46 monasteries were closed. Metropolitan Gavriil Kremenetsky (1770–1783) systematically pursued a centralizing policy in the Ukrainian Church. Bishops, hegumen, priests and monks became virtual state employees. In 1775, following the destruction of the Zaporozhian Sich, the Kherson eparchy (subordinated to the Synod) was formed, a part of the Metropolitanate of Kyiv was annexed to it. In the 18th century, most Kievan archeparchs were Ukrainian nationals; in the 19th century, most were Russian nationals.

=== Russification of the nation and the Church ===
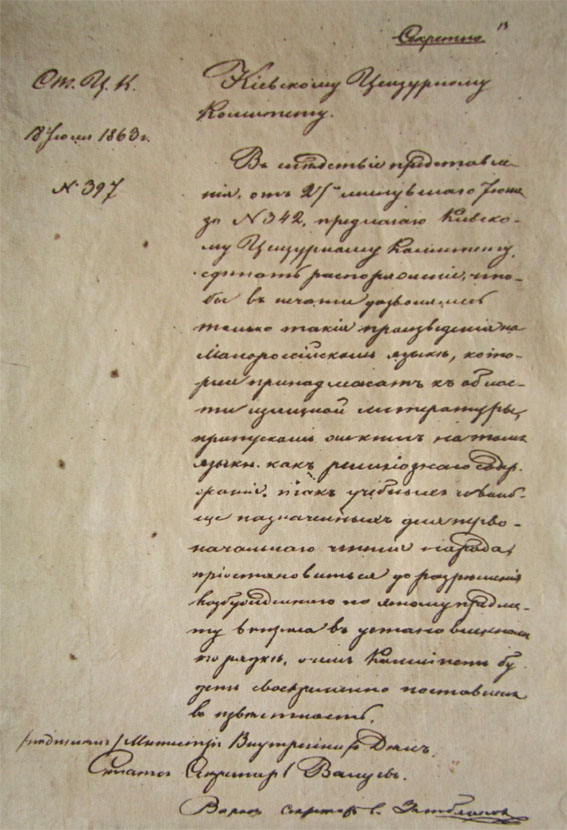
The Valuev Circular, issued by the minister of internal affairs of the Russian Empire, stating that the Ukrainian language "never existed, doesn't exist, and cannot exist."

The policy of active Russification of Ukraine and cultural assimilation of the Ukrainian people continued. According to historian Serhii Plokhy, "the abolition of the Hetmenate and the gradual elimination of its institution and military structure ended the notion of partnership and equality between Great and Little Russia imagined by generations of Ukrainian intellectuals." Russian imperialism relied on the support of the Russian clergy. At the same time, despite subordination to the Russian Orthodox Church and the Synod, the Ukrainian dioceses still retained some peculiarities in organization and church rites.

Policy decisions of the Russian government resulted in Ukrainian Orthodoxy gradually losing its connection with the Ukrainian people, culture and literature. The government decreed that books could only be published in Ukraine that strictly accorded with Russian texts. This policy lasted until 1917. In the Ukrainian Orthodox Trebnik of 1695, the names of no saints that were added to the Moscow lunar calendar as Moscow saints. Only in 1784 were all Ukrainian churches ordered to accept the Russian Lunar Dictionary. Ukrainian worship was translated into Moscow, Ukrainian theological and church books were banned.

In 1769, the Archimandrite of the Kyiv-Pechersk Lavra — Zosima Valkevych — asked the Synod for permission to print Ukrainian primers, because the people did not understand Russian and do not want to buy them. However, the Synod refused and even ordered the removal of those primers already in circulation. The situation was similar in education. Since 1784 all lectures at the Kyiv-Mohyla Academy have been given in Russian. The same was introduced in all schools in Ukraine. In 1800, the Synod issued a decree banning the construction of Ukrainian Baroque churches. In 1810, the Kyiv-Mohyla Academy was closed and the Theological Academy was established in its place.

== List of metropolitans and archbishops ==
- Metropolitan Gedeon Chetvertinsky (1685–1690) The former bishop of Lutsk was elected by a sobor initiated by Hetman Ivan Samoilovych. He later went for consecration to Moscow instead of Constantinople. Until 1688, he was styled "Metropolitan of Kyiv, Galicia, and all Ruthenia".
- Metropolitan Barlaam Yasinskyi (1690–1707)
- Metropolitan Joasaph Krokovskyi (1708–1718)

In 1718 Peter the Great abolished metropolitan.

- Archbishop Varlaam (Vanatovich) (1722–1730),
- Archbishop Raphael Zaborovsky (1731–1743); from 1743 to 1747 he served as Metropolitan
- Metropolitan Timothy Shcherbatsky (1748–1757)
- Metropolitan Arsenius Mohylyansky (1757–1770) In 1767 Empress Catherine the Great stripped Metropolitan Arsenius of the "of all Little Rus" part of his title.

== Metropolitans of Kyiv and Galicia (1770–1921) ==
In 1770, the Romanov civil authorities stripped the metropolis of its suffragan sees, reducing the office's jurisdiction to administration of a diocese. The autonomy was liquidated and the church was merged to the Russian Orthodox Church. The title became an honorific with no practical sense of governing an ecclesiastical territory beyond its own geographic remit. This is a list of bishops who retained this empty title:

- Gabriel Kremenetsky, 1770–1783
- Samuel Mstislavsky, 1783–1796
- Hierotheus Malytsky, 1796–1799
- Gabriel II, 1799–1803
- Serapion Alexandrovsky, 1803–1822
- Eugene Bolkhovitinov, 1822–1837
- Philaret Amphiteatrov, 1837–1857
- Isidore Nikolsky, 1858–1860
- Arsenius II, 1860–1876
- Philotheus Uspensky, 1876–1882
- Platon Gorodetsky, 1882–1891
- Joanicius Rudnev, 1891–1900
- Theognostus Lebedev, 1900–1903
- Flavian Gorodetsky, 1903–1915
- Vladimir Bogoyavlensky, 1915–1918
  - Nicodemus (Krotkov), 1918 (as bishop of Chyhyryn)
- Anthony (Khrapovitsky), 1918–1919 When Gen. Pyotr Wrangel′s White Army was defeated in South Russia in November 1920, Anthony emigrated. In 1921 he settled down in Sremski Karlovci, Serbia. Along with several other Russian bishops in exile, he established an independent Russian church administration that sought to embrace all Russian Orthodox diaspora, known as the Russian Orthodox Church Outside Russia (ROCOR).
  - Nazarius Blinov, 1919–1921

== Sources ==
- Mykola Andrusiak. "Józef Szumlański, pierwszy biskup unicki lwowski, 1667-1708 (Open Library". Openlibrary.org. Retrieved 2012-08-25.
- Bodin, Per-Arne (2015). "The Russian Orthodox Church, Its Domains and Borders". In Strandbrink, Peter; Berglund, Jenny; Lundén, Thomas (eds.). Crossings and Crosses: Borders, Educations, and Religions in Northern Europe. Religion and Society. Vol. 63. Berlin: De Gruyter. pp. 15–28. ISBN 978-1-61451-655-2.
- Magocsi, Paul Robert (1996). A History of Ukraine. Toronto: University of Toronto Press. ISBN 978-0-8020-0830-5.
- "Metropolitans of Kyiv". orthodox.org.ua. Ukrainian Orthodox Church (Moscow Patriarchate). 2011-01-14. Archived from the original on 2011-10-02.
- Shubin, Daniel H. (2004). A History of Russian Christianity, Vol. I: From the Earliest Years through Tsar Ivan IV. Algora Publishing. ISBN 978-0-87586-287-3.
- ——— (2005). A History of Russian Christianity. Volume II: The Patriarchal Era Through Peter the Great, 1586 to 1725. New York: Algora Publishing. ISBN 978-0-87586-348-1.
- Zhukovsky, Arkadii (1988). "Istanbul". In Kubijovyč, Volodymyr (ed.). Encyclopedia of Ukraine. Vol. 2. Toronto: University of Toronto Press. pp. 359–360. ISBN 978-1-4426-3281-3.
- This article incorporates text from a publication now in the public domain: Valois, Joseph Marie Noel (1911). "Basel, Council of". In Chisholm, Hugh (ed.). Encyclopædia Britannica. Vol. 3 (11th ed.). Cambridge University Press. pp. 463–464.
