= Antonii Vynnytskyi =

Metropolitan of Kiev, Galicia and all Ruthenia (1647–1657)

- Church: Ecumenical Patriarchate of Constantinople
- Metropolis: Kiev, Galicia and all Rus'
- Diocese: Przemysl
- See: Przemysl/Urizh
- In office: 1650–1679
- Predecessor: Sylvester Hulevych
- Successor: Innocenty Winnicki
- Opposed to: Joseph Shumlyanskyi, Joseph Tukalskyi

Orders
- Ordination: 24 April 1650 (bishop) by Sylvester Kosiv

Personal details
- Born: Urizh, Ruthenian Voivodeship, Polish–Lithuanian Commonwealth
- Died: 26 November 1679
- Buried: Lavriv Monastery, Ruthenian Voivodeship
- Denomination: Eastern Orthodox
- Coat of arms

Antonii Vynnytskyi, (Ukrainian: Антоній Винницький; born Urizh, Ruthenian Voivodeship, Polish–Lithuanian Commonwealth, died 13 April 1657) was the bishop of Przemysl in the Ecumenical Patriarchate of Constantinople in the Eastern Orthodox Church who was acting as Metropolitan of Kyiv, Galicia and all Rus.

== Bishop Antonii ==
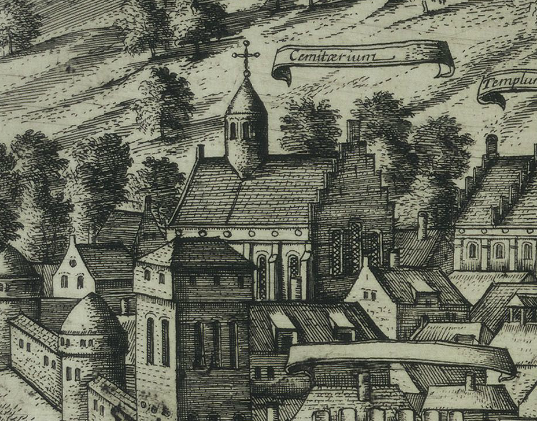
The lost Eastern Orthodox cathedral temple of Przemysl

Following the Battle of Zboriv (part of the Khmelnytskyi Uprising), Antonii was approved by the King of Poland John II Casimir Vasa to be appointed to the eparchy of Przemysl which was vacant since 1645. Supported by the Eastern Orthodox nobility (szlachta) and kliros of the Przemysl cathedral temple, Bishop Antonii has taken away the cathedra from Uniate bishop Athanasius Krupecki. Following the Battle of Berestechko, the Polish government attempted to hand over the cathedral temple back to the Uniate bishop Prokop Khmilevsky and later Antonii Terlecki, but Antonii Vynnytskyi refused.

On 9 November 1663 following the death of Metropolitan Dionysius and supported by Pavlo Teteria, Antonii was running for the post of Metropolitan of Kyiv, Galicia and Rus, but lost the election to bishop of Mstislav Joseph Tukalskyi. Both candidates were approved by the Crown of Poland, but Patriarch of Constantinople approved the election of Joseph Tukalskyi as well. Following the death of bishop of Lviv Athanasius Zheliborskyi, Antonii served as eparchial administrator for Lviv eparchy.

== Bibliography ==
- (in Polish) Bendza M. Prawosławna diecezja przemyska w latach 1596-1681: Studium historyczno-kanoniczne. Warsz., 1982; idem. Tendencje unijne względem cerkwi prawosławnej w Rzeczypospolitej w latach 1674–1686. Warsz., 1987.

== Notes ==
Preceded by Dionysius Balaban	Metropolitan of Kiev, Galicia and all Rus'; 1664–1666 (self-claimed); Served alongside: Joseph Tukalskyi	Succeeded by Metropolis of Camenez
Preceded by Sylvester Hulevych-Voyutynskyi	Bishop of Przemysl; 1650–1679	Succeeded by Innocenty Winnicki
