= Sylvester Hulevych =

First Orthodox bishop of Przemyśl

- Sylwester Wojutyński Hulewicz
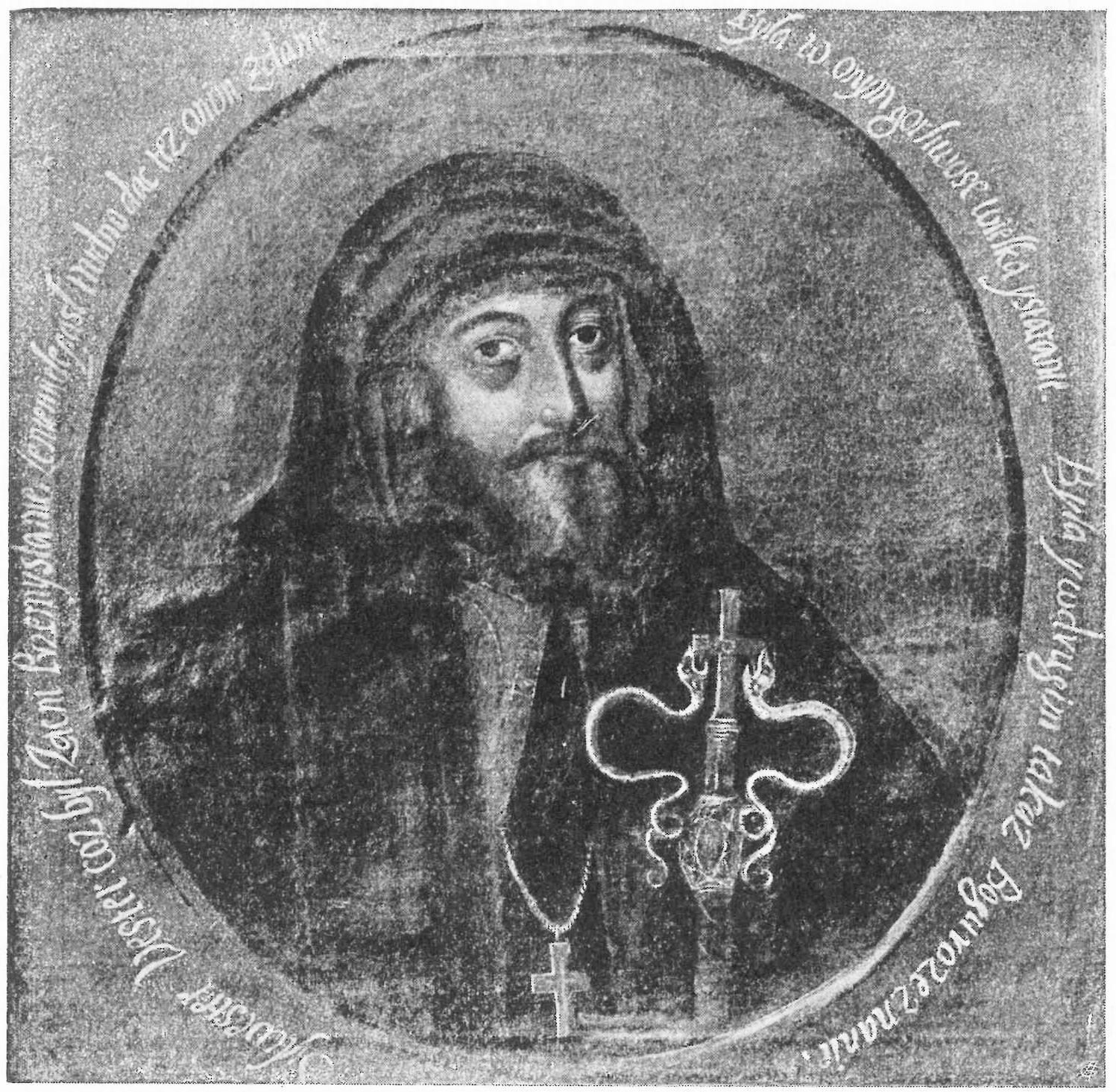
- Image of Sylvester in the Palace of the Greek Catholic Bishops in Przemyśl
- Born: Simeon Hulevych-Voyutinsky
- Died: May 31, 1645; Kamianets-Podilskyi
- Years active: 1635–1637; 1641–1643
- Religion: Eastern Orthodoxy
- Church: Ecumenical Patriarchate of Constantinople
- Ordained: March 14, 1635
- Title: Bishop of Przemyśl

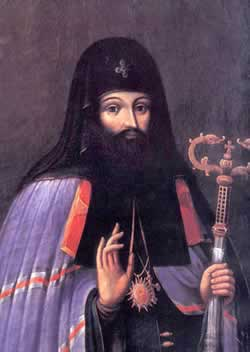
Head of the restored Orthodox Church and Hulevych's henchman, Petro Mohyla

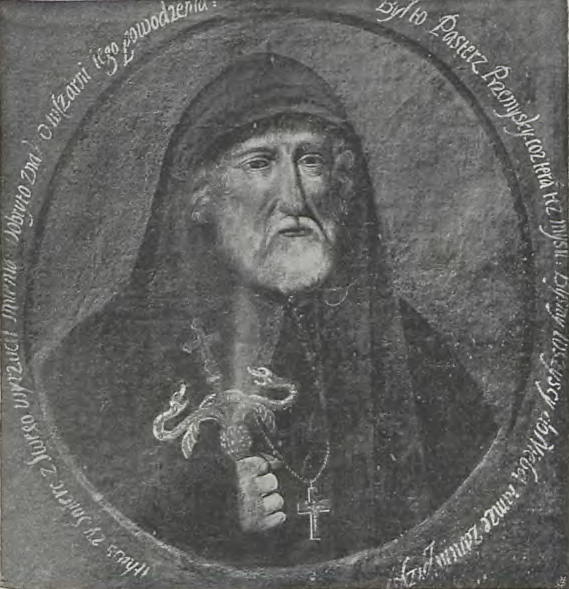
Uniate bishop Athanasius Krupecki, chief adversary of Sylvester Hulevych

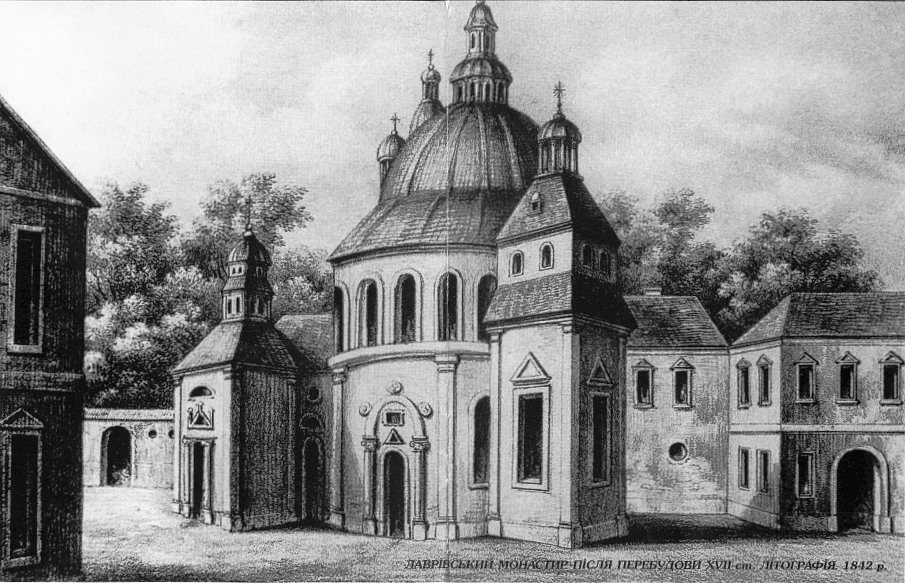
St. Onuphrius Monastery in Lavriv, lithograph from 1848. One of the three monasteries over which Sylvester Hulevych had disputes with Athanasius Krupecki

Sylvester Simeon Hulevych-Woyutinsky, also known as Semen Hulevych-Woyutinsky, Symeon Hulevych of Woyutin or Simon Hulevych, of the Nowina coat of arms (died 31 May 1645) was the first Orthodox bishop of Przemyśl after the restitution of the Orthodox Church in the Polish–Lithuanian Commonwealth, and a writer in Lutsk from 1628 to 1636.

His armed takeover of the granted Monastery of the Transfiguration (Holy Savior Monastery) led to a sentence of infamy against him. This incident became one of the key controversies between the Orthodox, the Uniates, and the Catholics during the reign of Władysław IV Vasa.

== Early life ==
Simeon Hulevych-Woyutinsky was born into a wealthy Orthodox noble family from the Lutsky Uyezd. Before 1632, he held the office of land writer there. On September 1 of that year, he signed a protest against the appointment of Józef Bakowiecki-Mokosiej to the bishop's position in Volodymyr, officially due to the violation of the election procedure. He was a deputy to the Sejm in 1615, the extraordinary Sejm in 1626, the convocation Sejm in 1632, the Sejm in 1634, the extraordinary Sejm in 1635, and the ordinary Sejm in 1635, representing the Volhynian Voivodeship. Hulevych was also elected as a deputy to the coronation Sejm in 1633, where he was notably active. As a deputy to the coronation Sejm, he was appointed as a deputy to the Rawa Treasury from Lesser Poland.

=== Episcopal nomination ===
The pacta conventa of King Władysław IV imposed on the monarch the obligation to restore the structures of the Orthodox Church within the Polish–Lithuanian Commonwealth. For the Przemyśl eparchy, it was decided to transfer the bishopric to the Orthodox faithful after the death of the Uniate bishop, Alexander Krupecki. Until then, the new Orthodox bishop was to receive three Basilian monasteries: the monastery in Smolnica, the Monastery of the Transfiguration (Savior Monastery) in Spasovo, and the Monastery of Saint Onuphrius in Lavriv. He was also to receive subsidies from the state and royal treasury.

The first royal nominee for the bishopric was Jan Chlopecki. However, he died en route to Przemyśl before taking office. The Orthodox community then nominated Simeon Hulevych as the next candidate for the bishopric of Przemyśl and Sambir on 20 March 1633. The election act was signed by about 200 signatories, including Petro Mohyla and Józef Boryskowicz.

Another group of Orthodox Christians nominated Ivan Popiel, who received the royal nomination on 18 March 1633, while a third candidate was the Hegumen Varlaam Broshnievsky. According to Marian Rechowicz, Popiel relinquished the bishopric to Hulevych in exchange for 3,000 złoty. Marian Bendza notes that Petro Mohyla opposed giving the episcopal consecration to a twice-married man. The issue was resolved by the death of the nominee before 14 December 1634. Hulevych received his official nomination on 14 March 1635 at the general Sejm, along with a promised salary of 2,000 złoty from the king. The nominee was soon tonsured, taking the religious name Sylvester, and was then consecrated as a bishop.

=== Fight for the monasteries ===
The Uniate bishop Athanasius Krupecki disagreed with the parliamentary decisions, and his supporter, the Przemyśl starosta Jan Mikołaj Daniłowicz, refused to grant Hulevych control over the monasteries. The new bishop decided to enforce the grants by force. He gathered supporters, including the royal commissioner – his brother-in-law and Chernigov standard-bearer Andriy Kosakowski, his brothers Alexander and Daniel, Andriy Zachorovsky, Simon Myschko Holonievsky, Theodore Vinnitsky, and Peter Sheptytsky. This group arrived on 10 June 1636 at the Wilich church near Przemyśl, where Hulevych established his base and gathered additional anti-union forces from all estates. With a group of 10,000 (according to Uniate Bishop Jacob Susza, 20,000), they went to Staryi Sambir, near the Monastery of the Transfiguration (Holy Savior Monastery), where the Uniate bishop resided. Krupecki rejected Hulevych's delegation's demands to hand over the monasteries to the Orthodox. He argued that the royal diploma was issued under a peace seal and was therefore invalid, and that he had a document granting him lifetime control of the monasteries. In response, Hulevych attacked the monastery. According to Mychajło Dowbysczenko, the building was shelled with artillery, and the assault was led by Kosakowski. After breaking through the palisade and monastery gates, the defenders barricaded themselves in a stone tower. Hand cannons were used during the fighting, resulting in the death of the Uniate bishop's brother and several injuries. Krupecki himself lay prostrate in the church. Although his life was spared due to Hulevych's intervention, the Uniate bishop was subjected to numerous insults and spent two days imprisoned in the monastery's underground, starving. After capturing the Holy Savior Monastery, Sylvester Hulevych also took control of the other two monasteries granted to him, along with their dependent villages: Dushowce, Lavriv, Nanchulka, Strashevichy, and Volkovitsy.

=== Infamy and attempts at rehabilitation ===
In response to the armed seizure of the monasteries, Athanasius Krupecki filed lawsuits against the attackers in the Przemyśl municipal court (24 June 1636), the Crown Tribunal in Lublin, and in Piotrków Trybunalski. He also launched a broad propaganda campaign, resulting in demands for the "contentment" of the Uniate bishop in the instructions of the Proszowice, Środa, Opatów, Wiszeński, and Bełz courts for the Sejm of 1637. At the Sejm, Orthodox deputies defended the bishop and other accused individuals. The prepared constitution Greek Religion absolved the disunites from responsibility for the armed conflicts, but the matter of redistributing properties in the Przemyśl diocese was postponed to the next Sejm. This constitution did not come into effect as the Sejm ended on March 3 without reaching a resolution. Just ten days later, the Piotrków Crown Tribunal imposed infamy on Bishop Sylvester (Note: According to Bendza (1982, p. 149), it was a temporary four-year infamy.) and several dozen of his supporters, (Note: Bendza (1982, p. 149) provides the number of 10 defendants, but immediately afterward writes that they included a large number of religious and lay clergy.) depriving Hulevych of his ability to perform clerical duties.

Athanasius Krupecki used this to force some Orthodox clergy to accept the Union. Disunite deputies requested the annulment of the infamy verdict at the extraordinary Sejm on 9 June 1637, but they failed to convince the other chamber members. The issue of Hulevych's rehabilitation returned at the ordinary Sejm of 1638. The demand to lift the infamy was one of the main "peace of the Greek Religion" issues raised by deputies from the Lutsky Uyezd, the Kiev and Polotsk voivodeships, and possibly the Bracław and Chernihiv voivodeships, as well as eastern Lithuania. Conversely, the Środa, Opatów, and general Ruthenian courts (the latter with a protest from the Orthodox nobility) demanded the enforcement of the verdicts.

The rehabilitation of Hulevych was raised by Volhynian deputies at the Sejm on April 10, but it did not gain traction in the chamber. Two weeks later, Władysław IV managed to pass the Greek Religion constitution, restoring the legal status established in 1635. However, due to protests from Jakub Sobieski and Jakub Maximilian Fredro, it did not include Hulevych's case. Legal battles over monastery ownership continued – during a trial in the Przemyśl municipal court, Metropolitan Mohyla's delegates defended the legality of the properties seized by Hulevych.

Efforts in July to reconcile the conflicting bishops in Przemyśl also failed. With an enforcement order, Athanasius Krupecki attempted to reclaim the lost monasteries but faced armed resistance from Hulevych, who barricaded himself in the Monastery of the Transfiguration. Among the known parliamentary instructions for the 1639 Sejm, only the Volhynian one instructed deputies to support the bishop, but the favorable Sejm for the Orthodox ended without a resolution.

Disunites showed significantly more activity at the 1640 Sejm. Annulment of Hulevych's infamy was one of their main demands, along with the return of churches in Lublin and Krasnystaw. The Sejm decided to form a commission on Orthodox claims, but its work did not reflect in the Sejm's constitutions. Later that year, Hulevych was subjected to the enforcement of the verdict, carried out by the Przemyśl starosta Jan Mikołaj Daniłowicz. As a result, the 1641 Sejm instructions included the appointment of a new Przemyśl bishop.

The exceptionally intransigent stance of the disunites led to the formation of a senatorial-deputational commission under Władysław IV. It began its sessions on September 18, and on the 25th, presented a constitution to the deputies, which they did not accept. The king presented further proposals at the senate session on September 29, deciding to annul the verdict against Hulevych, opposed only by Albrycht Stanisław Radziwiłł. The Sejm ultimately decided on Hulevych's rehabilitation on October 4. However, it was stipulated that the Holy Savior Monastery would belong to the Uniates, (Note: Dowbyszczenko (2005, p. 78) writes about a monastery in Lavriv, but this is most likely an error, as the author refers in a footnote to a biography by Marian Rechowicz, which mentions, as in the other sources, the Holy Savior Monastery.) and Hulevych's successor would hold only the title of archimandrite.

Hulevych did not adhere to these terms and in 1643 retook the Holy Savior Monastery. Consequently, he lost his supervision over the previously granted monasteries and other benefits. He was also forced to move to Kamianets-Podilskyi. Efforts to restore the bishop's favor were made by Orthodox deputies at the Sejm on 16 March 1645, but their proposals were not discussed in the session.

In 1642, Bishop Sylvester participated in the synod in Iași, signing a declaration condemning the teachings of Cyril Lucaris.

=== Death ===
Sylvester Hulevych's successor as the Bishop of Przemyśl was Antonii Vynnytskyi, who was nominated for the position on 24 April 1650. According to Marian Rechowicz, this suggests that Hulevych died before 1650. Mychajło Dowbysczenko estimates his death occurred in 1645 or early 1646, based on the nature of source materials from those years. Marian Bendza provides an exact date and location of death as 31 May 1645 in Kamianets-Podilskyi, though the source of this information is not disclosed.

== Private life ==
Simeon Hulevych had two brothers: Alexander and Daniel. His brother-in-law was the Chernigov standard-bearer Andriy Kosakowski.

=== Commemoration ===
The image of Sylvester Hulevych was displayed in the Palace of Greek Catholic Bishops in Przemyśl. The portrait was accompanied by a four-line verse:

Sylvester Vester, who was he, noble Przemyśl's pride?
Though little he led, his zeal could not be denied.
His effort was great, his zeal was true,
But judgment rests with God, who knew.

== Bibliography ==
- Dzięgielewski, Jan (1986). O tolerancję dla zdominowanych. Polityka wyznaniowa Rzeczypospolitej w latach panowania Władysława IV (in Polish). Warsaw: Polish Scientific Publishers PWN. ISBN 83-01-06012-3.
- Bendza, Marian (1982). Prawosławna diecezja przemyska w latach 1596–1681. Studium historyczno-kanoniczne (in Polish). Warsaw: Christian Theological Academy.
- Dowbyszczenko, Mychajło (2005). "Na rozdrożu religijnego wyboru: dramat rodziny Hulewiczów. Hulewiczowie w religijnych ruchach końca XVI – pierwszej połowy XVII w". Rocznik Instytutu Europy Środkowo-Wschodniej w Lublinie (in Polish). 3. ISSN 1732-1395.
- Łoziński, Władysław (1904). Prawem i lewem. Obyczaje na Czerwonej Rusi w pierwszej połowie XVII wieku (in Polish). Lviv: Altenberg Publishing.
