= Joseph Tukalskyi-Nelyubovych =

Metropolitan of Kiev, Galicia and all Ruthenia (17th century)

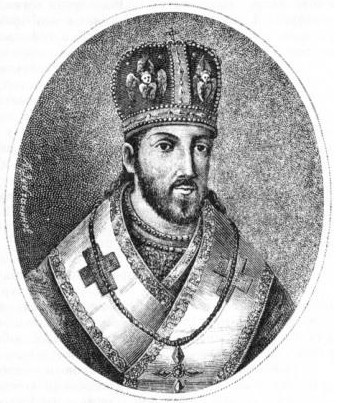
- Church: Ecumenical Patriarchate of Constantinople
- Metropolis: Kiev, Galicia and all Rus'
- Diocese: Kyiv
- See: Chyhyryn
- In office: 1663–1675
- Predecessor: Dionysius Balaban
- Successor: Gedeon Chetvertinsky (Russian Orthodox Church); Pancratius of Camenez
- Opposed to: Antonii Vynnytskyi
- Other posts: Bishop of Mogilev and Orsha (1661–1663)

Orders
- Ordination: 1661 (bishop) by Dionysius Balaban

Personal details
- Born: c. 1607 Nenkovychi, Brest Litovsk Voivodeship, Polish–Lithuanian Commonwealth
- Died: 26 July 1675 Chyhyryn, Cossack Hetmanate
- Buried: Mhar Monastery, Cossack Hetmanate
- Denomination: Eastern Orthodox
- Coat of arms

Sainthood
- Canonized: 22 November 2021 by Orthodox Church of Ukraine

Joseph Tukalskyi-Nelyubovych, (Ukrainian: Йосип Тукальський-Нелюбович; born Nenkovychi or Mutvytsia, Brest Litovsk Voivodeship, Polish–Lithuanian Commonwealth, died 26 July 1675, Chyhyryn) was a political and religious leader of the Cossack Hetmanate and the last Metropolitan of Kyiv, Galicia and all Rus in the Ecumenical Patriarchate of Constantinople in the Eastern Orthodox Church.

== Biography ==
Joseph Tukalskyi was born in a family of Eastern Orthodox nobility (szlachta) from Pinsk region (Polesye). He began his monastic life at a young age. He received tonsure in the Lishchyna monastery, which was quite famous at the time. And from 1654 he became its archimandrite. For almost four years, from 1657 to 1661, Joseph Tukalskyi-Nelyubovych was the hegumen of the Vilnius Holy Spirit Monastery. He was elected and ordained to the Mstislav, Mogilev and Orsha see by his predecessor Metropolitan Dionysius Balaban[-Tukalskyi] of Kyiv, who in addition to that was a relative of Joseph Nelyubovych-Tukalsky. Having just ascended the cathedral see, he repeated the fate of many Eastern Orthodox bishops of that time. Having suffered unbearable persecution from the apologists of the union (Union of Brest), Joseph Nelyuborvych-Tukalskyi came to Chyhyryn. Soon, at the election council in November 1663 in Korsun, Bishop Joseph Nelyubovych-Tukalskyi was elected Metropolitan of Kyiv. Many Ukrainian clergy and representatives of the Ukrainian nobility and Cossacks took part in the election of the First Hierarch.

In Right-Bank Ukraine, a somewhat even sarcastic situation developed in the place belonging to the Polish Crown, located in the city of Sharhorod (Podolia). For the privilege to be appointed a metropolitan, there arrived three candidates at once: Yaskulskyi, the Uniate bishop from Mogilev, Antonii Vynnytskyi, the bishop of Przemysl, and Hedeon Khmelnytskyi (Yuriy Khmelnytskyi), the former Hetman's Bulava (mace) holder, the son of Bohdan Khmelnytskyi. King Jan Casimir refused Yakulsky and Vynnytskyi to the appointment, and unexpectedly even for the monk Hedeon himself, he chose him to be the Metropolitan of Kyiv. This shocked the still young and inexperienced wearer of the black-colored vestment and he shied away from such "royal mercy".

The Bishop of Przemyśl, Antonii Vynnytskyi, having met with failure in the place belonging to the Polish Crown, turned to the hetman of Right-Bank Ukraine, Pavlo Teteria, for support. It was not easy for the latter to do. But soon an auspicious hour came for this. The Crown hetman and voivode of Kyiv Stefan Czarniecki, having received unlimited power in Ukraine, took up the task of persuading the Cossacks to return to the supremacy of the Polish Crown. Knowing what kind of power the newly elected Metropolitan Joseph Nelyubovych-Tukalskyi had over the Cossacks, he invited him together with Hegumen Hedeon Khmelnytskyi to his place. There was no constructive conversation between the Metropolitan and the Polish Crown Hetman Stefan Czarniecki. The answer of the humble saint was more than categorical: "It is not up to humble monks to interfere in worldly affairs." Such a concession by Joseph Nelyubovych-Tukalsky greatly offended Stefan Czarniecki, and he ordered to arrest the metropolitan and the hegumen and send them to Warsaw. The hetman of Teteria learned about all this and wrote a complaint to the king about the practically already imprisoned dignitaries of the Ukrainian Church. Joseph Nelyubovych-Tukalskyi and Hedeon Khmelnytskyi were sent to the Marienburg prison by order of the Polish king. This unfortunate event took place in July 1664. Only after that, Antonii Vynnytskyi unhindered declared himself also Metropolitan of Kyiv and managed the department for two years, without even coming to Kyiv.

The arrest and exile of Metropolitan Joseph Nelyubovych-Tukalskyi made a very unpleasant impression within Ukraine, and the same Teteria, who was the main culprit in this case, already in the spring of 1664 began to ask the king for the release of the metropolitan, but with the caveat that former prisoners they will live somewhere near Pinsk or in Volhynia and not "interfere in politics". As a result of such a rehabilitation campaign, on November 29, 1665, Metropolitan Joseph Nelyubovych-Tukalskyi and Archimandrite Hedeon Khmelnytskyi took an oath "standing on their knees and placing two fingers on the cross" and assuring everyone that they would be loyal to Poland and would not communicate with its enemies, especially rebels, insurrectionists, Muscovites, and Cossacks and will listen to Hetman Teteria, living where he tells them. This seemingly humiliating oath of the metropolitan was later printed on January 24, 1671 in the Universal decree of the Polish king Michał Korybut Wiśniowiecki and fell into the hands of the Cossack chronicler Samiylo Velychko, who hastened to include it in his work.

But, more than Pavlo Teteria, for the imprisoned metropolitan was petitioning hetman Petro Doroshenko. In every letter to the king, the Bulava (mace) holder asked for the release of the hierarch and the archimandrite, and the release came in February 1666.

After leaving the prison, the Metropolitan went to his native Lishchyna Monastery and from there, as the Metropolitan of Kyiv, Galicia and All Rus, issued a charter releasing the residents of Mogilev from the curse falsely imposed on them by the Patriarch Nikon of Moscow. After staying in Belarus for a little more than a year, the metropolitan was forced to move to Ukraine, because he was once again slandered. Under the threat of new imprisonment, Joseph Nelyubovych-Tukalsky, with only one serviceman (cheliad) in a boat, sailed down the Dnieper straight to Cherkasy, and from there he was taken to Chyhyryn to hetman Peter Doroshenko, who received him with love, gave him a court and manor estates.

Metropolitan Joseph Nelyubovych-Tukalskyi became the closest adviser to Hetman Petro Doroshenko and had considerable influence on him. He sat in the Cossack officer council, conducted diplomatic correspondence with influential political figures. The Cossack officers did not like such a relationship between the hetman and the metropolitan, and everyone began to complain that "Hetman Doroshenko does not consult with anyone, only Metropolitan Tukalskyi." It was the Metropolitan of Kyiv who was considered the main promoter of the policy that led Petro Doroshenko to the Turkish coast. "It is obvious," writes historian D. Doroshenko, "the presence of the head of the Orthodox Ukrainian Church and the son of Bohdan Khmelnytskyi gave the court of Hetman Doroshenko a special shine and strengthened his authority in the eyes of the population". The Moscow agent Tyapkin wrote in a report to Moscow that "the black peoples (commoners) on both sides of the Dnieper love and respect Metropolitan Tukalsky very much."

The relations between Metropolitan Joseph Nelyubovych-Tukalskyi and Hetman Pyotr Doroshenko were constantly influenced by foreign policy and Chyhyryn's attitude towards the three states that wanted to take Ukraine into their hands, under the so-called protection: the Muscovite Tsardom, the Polish-Lithuanian Commonwealth, and the Ottoman Empire. Moscow exerted its influence on Metropolitan Joseph Nelyubovych-Tukalsky through Kyiv-Pechersk Monastery Archimandrite Innocent Giesel, who was on friendly terms with the Metropolitan. Of course, then the metropolitan would have to influence Hetman Petro Doroshenko. However, let's not forget that Moscow did not recognize Joseph Nelyubovych-Tukalsky as a metropolitan, but a significant part of the Ukrainian clergy, especially the Kyiv clergy, highly respected him and recognized his authority. The metropolitan himself understood this, which is why he came in the fall of 1667 to the Mezhyhiria Saviour-Transfiguration Monastery in order to meet with Archimandrite Innocent Giesel. The latter behaved very cautiously and did not dare to go to Mezhyhiria, showing the Metropolitan's letter to Voivode Peotr Sheremetiev the Great, who asked Moscow whether he should meet with Joseph Nelyubovych-Tukalskyi. The White-stoned city (Kremlin), Innocent Giesel was ordered to meet with the metropolitan without fail in matters concerning the beginning of Moscow's conflict with Doroshenko. Subsequently, in December 1667, Moscow, through Voivode Sheremetiev, sent the nobleman Vasiliy Dubensky and rittmaster Ivan Roslavlev to Chyhyryn, who, during a meeting with Metropolitan Joseph Nelyubovych-Tukalskyi and Archimandrite Hedeon Khmelnytskyi, persuaded him to influence the hetman to break the alliance with the Sublime Porte (busurmans).

Hetman Petro Doroshenko, in his goals of establishing relations with Moscow, sought only one thing - not to give Kyiv away to the Poles. But this time, too, Moscow cheated. The Truce of Andrusovo between Moscow and Poland on October 28, 1667 greatly struck Petro Doroshenko. Having learned about this from the letter of Voivode Sheremetiev, the hetman fell ill and lay ill for two days after that. Before that, Polish ambassadors came to Chyhyryn, but Doroshenko returned them with nothing and sent his ambassadors to the Turkish sultan with news about the Polish-Moscow accord. The Moscow ambassador Tyuterev was mentioning these events in Chyhyryn. The hetman took him with him to the church, where Metropolitan Joseph Nelyubovych-Tukalskyi and Archimandrite Hedeon Khmelnytsky celebrated the Liturgy. At all ectenia, as Tyuterev noted, the Polish king was commemorated, and during the grand entrance, Archimandrite Hedeon also commemorated the Moscow czar. Moscow sent not only spies such as Dubensky and Tyuterev to Petro Doroshenko. For the actual negotiations with the hetman, Afanasy Ordin-Nashchokin authorized the solicitor, resident Vasiliy Tyapkin, one of his best diplomats, in the future the first Moscow resident in Warsaw.

== See also ==
- The Ruin (Ukrainian history)
  - Polish–Ottoman War (1672–1676)
  - Russo-Turkish War (1676–1681)
- Ottoman Ukraine

== Notes ==
Preceded by Dionysius Balaban	Metropolitan of Kiev, Galicia and all Rus'; 1663–1675; Served alongside: Antonii Vynnytskyi	Succeeded by Metropolis of Camenez
