= Metropolis of Kiev, Galicia and all Rus' (1620–1686) =

Metropolis in Polish-Lithuanian Commonwealth

The Metropolis of Kiev, Galicia and all Rus' was a metropolis of the Ecumenical Patriarchate of Constantinople in the Eastern Orthodox Church that was erected in 1620. The dioceses (eparchies) included the Eparchy of Kiev itself, along with the eparchies of Lutsk, Lviv, Mahilioŭ, Przemyśl, Polatsk, and Chernihiv. The dioceses lay in the territory of the Polish–Lithuanian Commonwealth, which was at war with the Tsardom of Moscow for much of the 17th century. Around 1686, the Kiev and Chernihiv dioceses became Moscow-controlled territory. At the same time, the metropolis transferred from the ecclesiastical jurisdiction of the Ecumenical Patriarchate of Constantinople to the Patriarchate of Moscow in 1686. It is a matter of dispute as to whether this de facto transfer was also de jure or canonical.

== History ==
Since 1596, most Orthodox bishops in the Polish–Lithuanian Commonwealth supported the Union of Brest which transferred their allegiance from the Ecumenical Patriarchate of Constantinople to the Holy See. In order to preserve their privileges before the Polish king, the nobility, in great numbers, started to convert from Orthodoxy to Greek and Roman Catholicism. As with the previous Florentine Union, not all Orthodox clergy accepted the union; some eparchies (dioceses) continued to give their loyalty to Constantinople. These dissenters had no ecclesiastical leaders but with Petro Konashevych-Sahaidachny—the Hetman of the Zaporozhian Cossacks—they had a secular leader who was opposed to the union with Rome. The Cossacks' strong historic allegiance to the Eastern Orthodox Church put them at odds with the Catholic-dominated Commonwealth. Tensions increased when Commonwealth policies turned from relative tolerance to the suppression of the Orthodox church, making the Cossacks strongly anti-Catholic. By that time, the loyalty of the Zaporozhian hetmanate to the Commonwealth was only nominal. In August 1620, the Hetman prevailed upon Theophanes III—the Greek Orthodox Patriarch of Jerusalem—to re-establish an Orthodox metropolis in the realm. Theophanes consecrated Job Boretsky as the new "Metropolitan of Kiev, Galicia and all Ruthenia" and as the "Exarch of Ukraine".

=== Inter-confessional conflict within the Ruthenian Church ===
Members of the Ruthenian Uniate Church ("Greek Catholics") considered the establishment of the metropolis—in opposition to the Metropolis of Kiev, Galicia and all Ruthenia—to be an uncanonical act. The appointment deepened the schism between the two ecclesiastical jurisdictions. Disputes arose as to the ownership of church buildings and monasteries. According to Orest Subtelny, in his book Ukraine, sectarian violence over ownership of church property increased and "hundreds of clerics on both sides died in confrontations that often took the form of pitched battles." One such victim was the Archbishop of Polotsk—Josaphat Kuntsevych.

=== Recognition and attempts at reconciliation ===
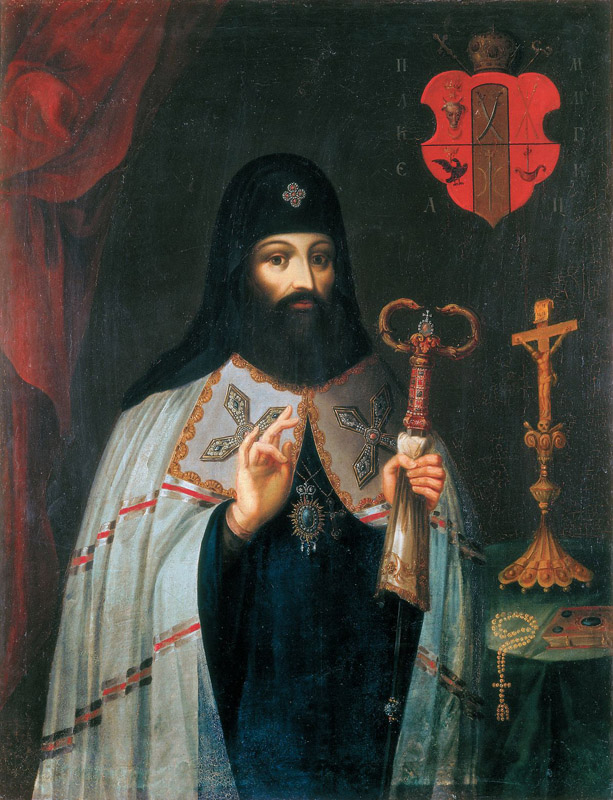
Petro Mohyla

By 1632, relations had calmed under the leadership of Metropolitan Petro Mohyla. In that year, the government legalized the situation by permitting both Greek Orthodox ("disuniate") and Greek Catholic ("uniate") jurisdictions within the realm. (Note: The hierarchy which was consecrated in 1620 was legalized by the government in a 1632 agreement that permitted both the disuniate Greek Orthodox and uniate Greek Catholic jurisdictions within the Polish–Lithuanian Commonwealth.) The government imposed a settlement on the "unsettling and destructive" conflict by legalizing the both hierarchies and redistributing church property between the Greek Orthodox and the Greek Catholics. Bain noted that, c. 1632, the nobles and clergy owned most of the land: they owned 160,000 villages out of a total of 215,000, and paid no taxes at all.

Attempts were made at reconciliation between the parties. The first attempts took place in 1623 under the uniate Metropolitan, Joseph Velamin-Rutski. The idea was also advanced by Metropolitan Meletius Smotrytsky who had secretly joined the Catholic church in 1627. He joined with the newly elected Archimandrite, Petro Mohyla, in preparing a synod of the Orthodox hierarchy to be held at Kyiv in the same year. By restoring the cathedral of Saint Sophia in Kyiv and other monuments, Mohyla strengthened the Ukrainian Church's position. His efforts also served to boost morale for the whole country at a time when national unity and independence were at risk. Another synod of bishops met in 1628. A further joint synod was proposed for Lviv in the following year. Negotiations for the unification of the Ukrainian churches continued under Rutsky's successors, Rafajil Korsak (1637–1640) and Antin Sielava (1640–1655).

At the 1633 Coronation Sejm that elected Wladyslaw IV Vasa as the King of Poland, the newly elected King of Poland confirmed the Articles for the Reassurance of the Ruthenian people recognizing the Ruthenian Eastern Orthodox Church. According to the Articles, the Uniates were receiving 7 eparchies, while the Eastern Orthodox followers – 5, and at the same time among those split eparchies of the original Metropolis of Kyiv, Galicia and all Rus, three were allowed to contain both confessions.

==== List of eparchies ====
- Eparchy of Kyiv (Metropolitan) with Kyiv-Pechersk Lavra
- Eparchy of Lviv
- Eparchy of Lutsk
- Eparchy of Mstislav (as Orsha and Mogilev)
- Eparchy of Przemyśl

=== The metropolis in the Ruthenian Cossack state (1648–1663) ===
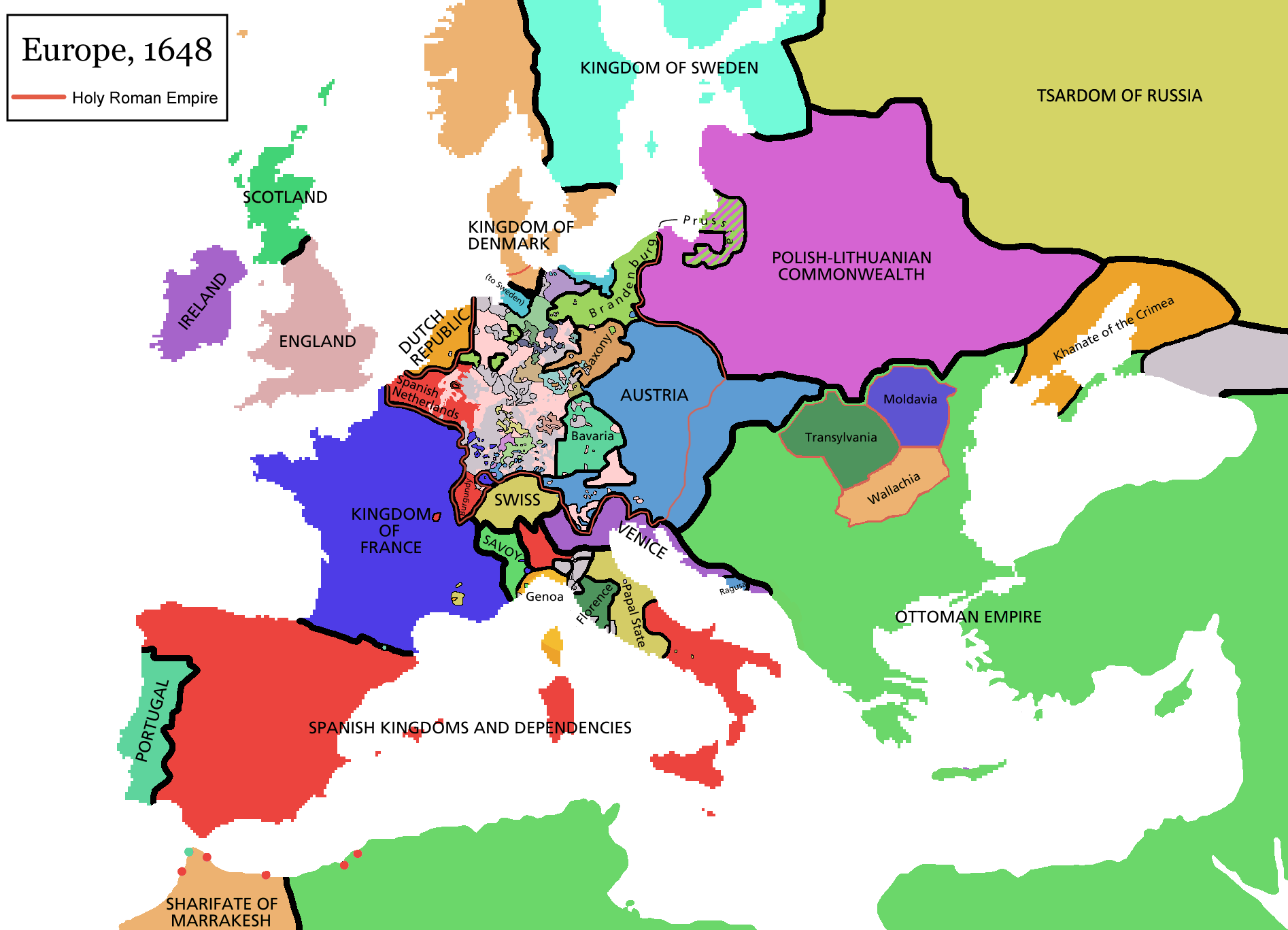
Europe in 1648

The Khmelnytsky Uprising of 1648 led to the creation of a Ruthenian Cossack state in the eastern territories of the Polish–Lithuanian Commonwealth which was under the suzerainty of the Commonwealth. The leader of the Zaporozhian Host was Hetman Bohdan Khmelnytsky. Under Metropolitan Sylvester Kosiv (1647–1657), the metropolis continued to flourish in the new quasi-state. By the terms of the Treaty of Zboriv (1649) between the Cossacks and the Poles, the Kievan metropolis was to be guaranteed a seat in the Polish Senate. However, when Catholic bishops refused to admit the Orthodox metropolitan (Kosiv) to the Senate, hostilities resumed. In 1654, the Hetman concluded the Treaty of Pereyaslav with the Russian Tsar.

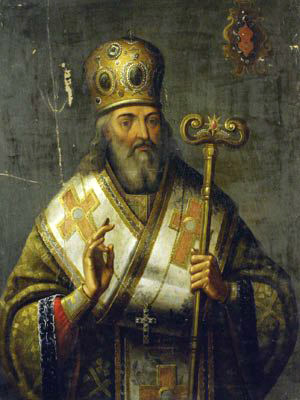
Dionysius Balaban

Immediately after Bohdan Khmelnytsky's death, the Moscow voivodes began to send ambassadors to the church hierarchs, Ivan Vyhovsky, and the Cossack officers, so that they would not elect a metropolitan without the "blessing" of the Moscow patriarch. However, since there were too few Moscovite troops in left-bank Ukraine, the pressure was unsuccessful. The election of the Metropolitan took place under ancient Ukrainian rights, not by tsarist order. On 6 December 1657, Kosiv was succeeded as metropolitan by the Bishop of Lutsk, Dionysius Balaban (1657–1663); But even after that, Moscow pressured Vyhovsky not to send to Constantinople for approval at the metropolitanate of the elected Dionysius, but to approve him as king. To which they were told that from the beginning of the holy baptism of Vladimir, the Kievan metropolitans had received their blessings from the Patriarch of Constantinople. Balaban also pursued his predecessor's policies of maintaining the independence of the metropolis. In 1658, Metropolitan Balaban was forced to relocate his episcopal seat to Chyhyryn due to the occupation of Kiev by Muscovite troops. From that time onwards, Dionysius' rule was effectively limited to right-bank Ukraine; he was unable to govern the dioceses on the left bank of the Dnieper.

Vyhovsky approved the consecration of Josyf Tukalsky-Neliubovych as bishop of "Orsha and Mstsislaw" (located in the modern state of Belarus). Hetman Vyhovshy accused the Tsardom of Moscow of violating the terms of the Pereiaslav Agreement. Metropolitan Balaban supported the hetman's pro-Polish policies in this regard and was the co-author of the Treaty of Hadiach (1658). Teteria was one of the Hetman's negotiators for the treaty; after this, his policies became openly pro-Polish. The treaty aimed to establish a "Commonwealth of Three Nations" by transforming the Polish–Lithuanian Commonwealth into a Polish–Lithuanian–Ruthenian Commonwealth (Rzeczpospolita Trojga Narodów). It would have elevated the Cossacks and Ruthenians to a position that was equal to that of the Poles and Lithuanians in the Polish–Lithuanian union. The treaty provided that Orthodoxy should be the predominant religion in the south-eastern provinces: the Kiev Voivodeship, the Bracław Voivodeship, and the Chernihiv Voivodeship. When the idea of a Ruthenian Duchy within the Commonwealth was abandoned, the proposal collapsed. The Canadian historian Paul Robert Magocsi believes that happened because of the divisions among the Cossacks and because of the Russian invasion.

=== Division of the metropolis (1658–1686) ===
From 1658 to 1686, control of the metropolis was initially disputed between two and later three different parties: those loyal to the Cossack Hetmanate, those loyal to the Polish–Lithuanian Commonwealth and those loyal to the Tsardom of Moscow.

==== The metropolis in Russian controlled territory ====
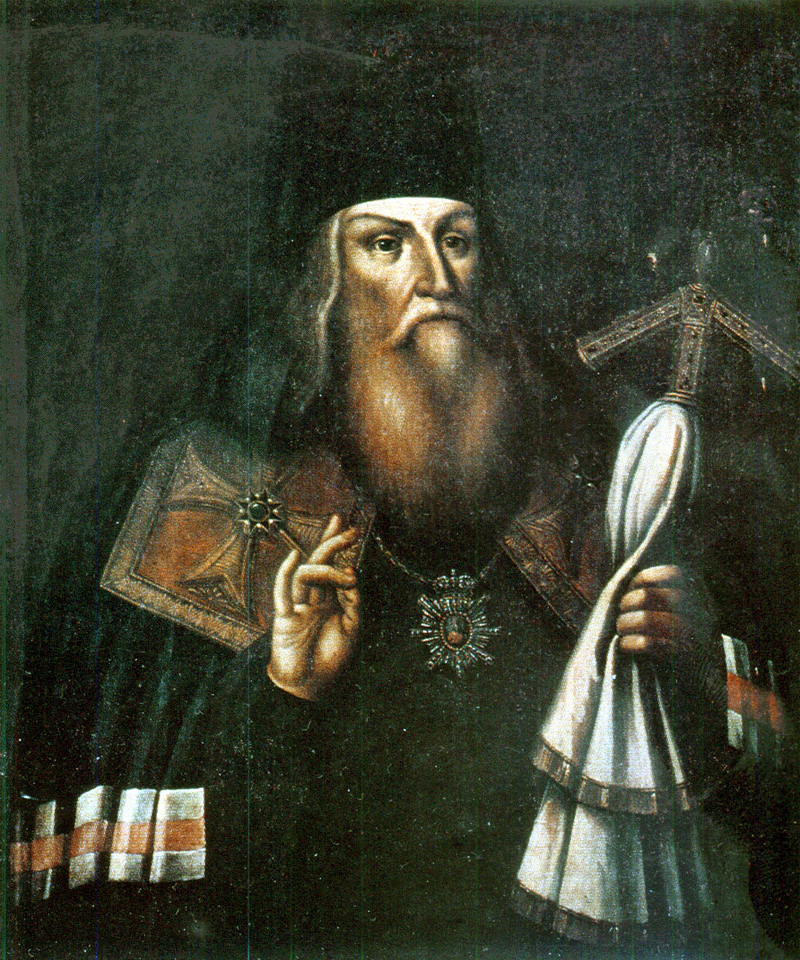
Lazar Baranovych

Hetman Samoilovych and the Moscow government were anxious to fill the Kievan throne. Since Lazar Baranovych disagreed with Moscow's desire to subjugate it to the position of an ordinary diocese and fought for the preservation of the rights of the Ukrainian clergy, neither the hetman nor Moscow regarded him as a suitable candidate. Furthermore, since the Archbishop of Chernihiv hated the Bishop of Lutsk, the hetman thought it best to arrange for the Kievan clergy and laity to elect the new metropolitan, rather than to appeal directly to Moscow. An election council convened in Kiev on 8 July 1685 in the Cathedral of St. Sophia. Lazar Baranovych did not attend due to "the weakness of his health", nor did he send proxies. There were no delegates from the dioceses that remained in the territory of the Polish–Lithuanian Commonwealth. Only the clergy of the diocese of Kiev itself were present. Secular representatives of the hetman outnumbered clergy at the council. While the clergy did not wish to "leave the former obedience to the throne of Constantinople".

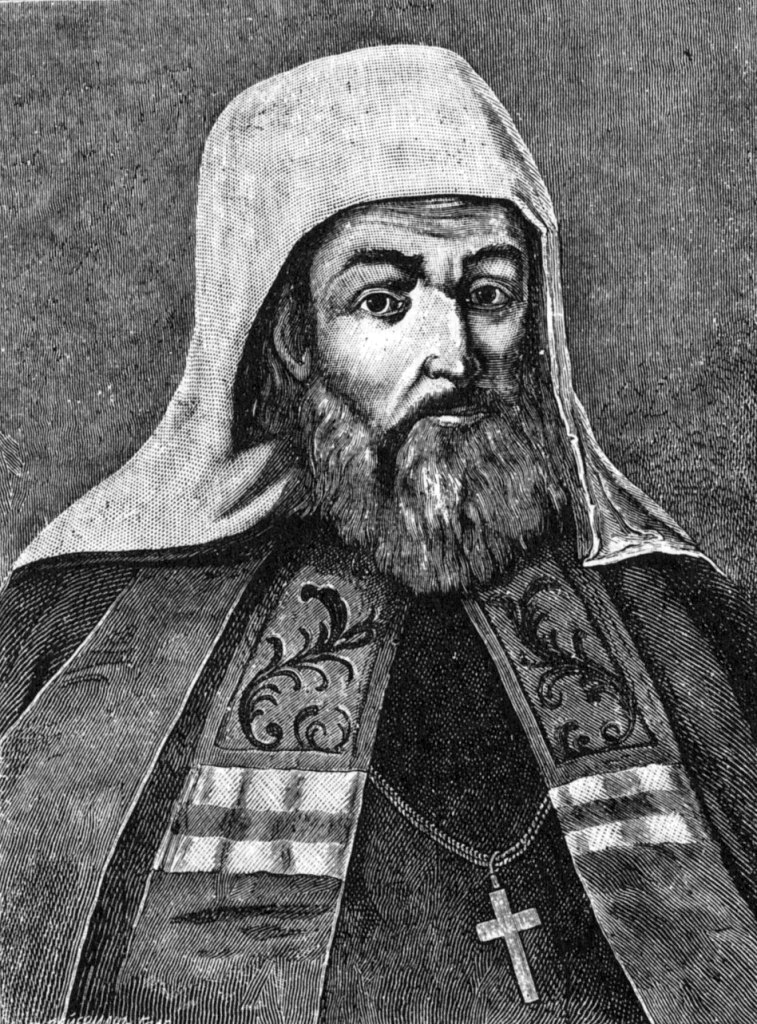
Gedeon Chetvertinsky

In October 1685, Chetvertinsky was appointed by Patriarch Joachim of Moscow to the newly-created title of "Metropolitan of Kiev, Galicia and Little Russia". (Note: King Sigismund III Vasa accused their consecrator, Theophanes III, Greek Orthodox Patriarch of Jerusalem, of being a covert agent working on behalf of the Ottoman Empire and ordered his arrest and the arrest of those consecrated by him.)

==== The metropolis in the Cossack Hetmanate ====
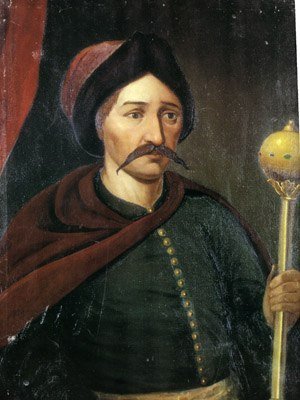
Pavlo Teterya

In the Cossack Hetmanate, a council of officer's held at Chyhyryn in October 1662 elected Pavlo Teteria was to succeed Yurii Khmelnytsky as hetman.

==== The metropolis in the Commonwealth proper ====
Antonii Vynnytskyi (1600 – 26 November 1679) was consecrated bishop of Peremyshl in 1650. Thirteen years later, Vynnytsky was elected as Metropolitan of Kiev and Exarch of the Patriarch of Constantinople in Ukraine. This was at the behest of the king who refused to recognise Joseph Tukalsky-Neliubovych.

=== Absorption of the metropolis by the Patriachate of Moscow ===
In the fall of 1676, Ivan Samoylovych crossed the Dnieper with an army of 30,000 men and besieged Chyhyryn for a second time. After several hours of battle, Doroshenko asked his 2,000 Serdiuk garrison to lay down their arms as he had decided to abdicate, which he did on 19 September 1676. Doroshenko was arrested and brought to Moscow where he was kept in honorary exile, never to return to Ukraine.

That same year, the Ottomans, acting on behalf of the Regent of Russia, Sophia Alekseyevna, pressured the Patriarch of Constantinople into transferring the exarchate from the jurisdiction of Constantinople to the Patriarchy of Moscow. As a result, the Ecumenical Patriarch Dionysius IV and the Holy Synod of the Ecumenical Patriarchate issued a synodal letter that gave the Patriarch of Moscow the right to ordain the Metropolitan of Kiev. This effectively established the Metropolis of Kiev (Patriarchate of Moscow). Deacon Nikita Alekseev presented Patriarch Dionysius with 200 gold and "three forty sables" for these documents, for which he received a handwritten receipt from Dionysius. In his letter to the Moscow tsars, the patriarch of Constantinople asked to send a "salary" for the other bishops who signed the act.

The ecclesiastical-historical and canonical assessment of this event differs greatly in the Moscow Patriarchate and Ecumenical Patriarchate of Constantinople. The Russian Orthodox Church claims that this was a transfer of the Metropolis of Kiev; the position of the Ecumenical Patriarchate is that there was only an "Act" giving the right to ordain the Metropolitan of Kiev to the Moscow Patriarch. At the same time, the Metropolis of Kiev remained part of the Ecumenical Patriarchate of Constantinople.

== List of metropolitans ==
Name	Reigned from ... to
Job I Isaiah I Peter I Sylvester I Dionysius I Joseph I vacant	1620–1631; 1631–1633; 1633–1646; 1647–1657; 1657–1663; 1663–1675; 1675–1685

== Sources ==
- Blažejovskyj, Dmytro (1990). Hierarchy of the Kyivan Church (861–1990). Vydanni͡a Ukraïnsʹkoho katolʹytsʹkoho universytetu im. Sv. Klymenta Papy Editiones Universitatis Catholicae Ucrainorum S. Clementis Papae Sacrum Ucrainae millenium. Vol. 72. Rome: [Ukraïnsʹkyĭ katolyt͡sʹkyĭ universytet im. Sv. Klymenta Papy]. OCLC 22834909.
- Crummey, Robert O. (2006). "Eastern Orthodoxy in Russia and Ukraine in the age of counter-Reformation". In Angold, Michael (ed.). Eastern Christianity. The Cambridge history of Christianity. Vol. 5. Cambridge: Cambridge University Press. pp. 302–324. doi:10.1017/CHOL9780521811132.014. ISBN 9780521811132 – via Cambridge Histories Online.
- Encyclopedia of Ukraine, Kyiv
- Krasiński, Waleryan (1840). Historical sketch of the rise, progress and decline of the reformation in Poland. Vol. 2. London: J. L. Cox and Sons. OCLC 714971939.
- Medlin, William K.; Patrinelis, Christos G. (1971). Renaissance influences and religious reforms in Russia : Western and post-Byzantine impacts on culture and education (16th-17th centuries). Études de philologie et d'histoire. Vol. 18. Genève: Librairie Droz. ISBN 9782600038942.
- Senyk, Sophia (1996). "The Ukrainian Church in the seventeenth century". Analecta Ordinis S. Basilii Magni (Sectio II, vol XV (XXI), Fasc 1–4). Rome: sumptibus PP. Basilianorum.
- "Metropolitans of Kyiv". orthodox.org.ua. Ukrainian Orthodox Church (Moscow Patriarchate). 2011-01-14. Archived from the original on 2011-10-02.
