= Athanasius Shumliansky =

Athanasius (born Antony Shumlianski; died 1694) was Brother of Iosyf Shumliansky and a former Orthodox bishop of Lutsk from 1686 to 1688. In 1688 he converted to Catholicism and the union in the diocese declared his successor Dionysius (1702).
