= Gedeon Chetvertinsky =

17th century Ruthenian prince and hierarch of the Eastern Orthodox Church

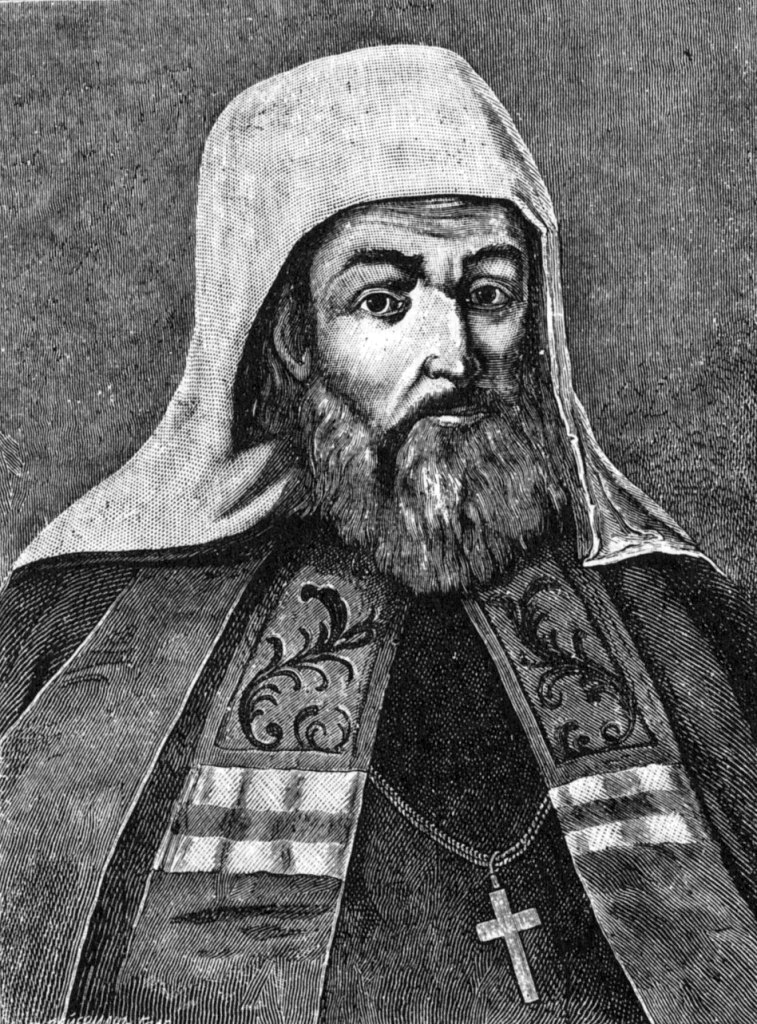
Gedeon Chetvertinsky

Gedeon Sviatopolk-Chetvertynsky (Ukrainian: Гедеон Святополк-Четвертинський), secular name Hryhoriy, Ukrainian: Григорій Святополк-Четвертинський; Russian: Григорий Захарович Святополк-Четвертинский, Grigory Zakharovich Svyatopolk-Chetvertinsky; died 1690) was a Ruthenian prince and hierarch of the Eastern Orthodox Church, who accepted allegiance to Moscow. In 1685, he was appointed by the Patriarch of Moscow to the rank of "Metropolitan of Kiev, Galicia and all Ruthenia". The appointment was recommended by hetman of the Zaporizhian Host Ivan Samoylovych.

== Biography ==
Stemming from a noble family of Rurikid stock, Gedeon was born as Hryhoriy to the starosta of Racibórz Zachary Svyatopolk-Chetvertynsky and Regina Chrenicka in Volhynian Voivodeship, Polish–Lithuanian Commonwealth.

in 1659 Gedeon was appointed bishop of Lutsk and Ostroh. Fleeing from persecution by Polish government after a conflict with the Uniate Church, in 1684 he moved to Baturyn and was welcomed by hetman Ivan Samoilovych. His nephew later married the hetman's daughter Anastasia.

In July 1685 a church synod was gathered in Kyiv at the initiative of Samoilovych. Despite the refusal of higher clergy to take part in the assembly, its participants proclaimed Gedeon metropolitan. In October 1685, he went to Moscow to be formally installed in the metropolis by Patriarch Joachim of Moscow. The tsar's charter issued in advance to Gedeon's consecration guaranteed the "usual rights and freedoms" of the Kyiv metropolis. In May 1686 the tsar's diplomats received a permit from patriarch Dionysius of Constantinople, which provided Moscow with control over the metropolitans of Kyiv.

After the deposition of Samoilovych, in 1688 Gedeon was barred from using the particle "of all Ruthenia" in his title.

== Legacy ==
Gedeon's decision to accept his installation from the Patriarch of Moscow undermined the independence of the Orthodox Church in those parts of Ruthenian lands that lay in the Polish-Lithuanian Commonwealth. The decision was schismatic and was not recognised by the Ecumenical Patriarchate of Constantinople. It was also opposed by many church leaders in Ukraine. He had two successors who were also styled "Metropolitan of Kiev, Halych and Little Russia": Varlaam (1690–1707) and Joasaph (1707–1718).

== Gallery ==
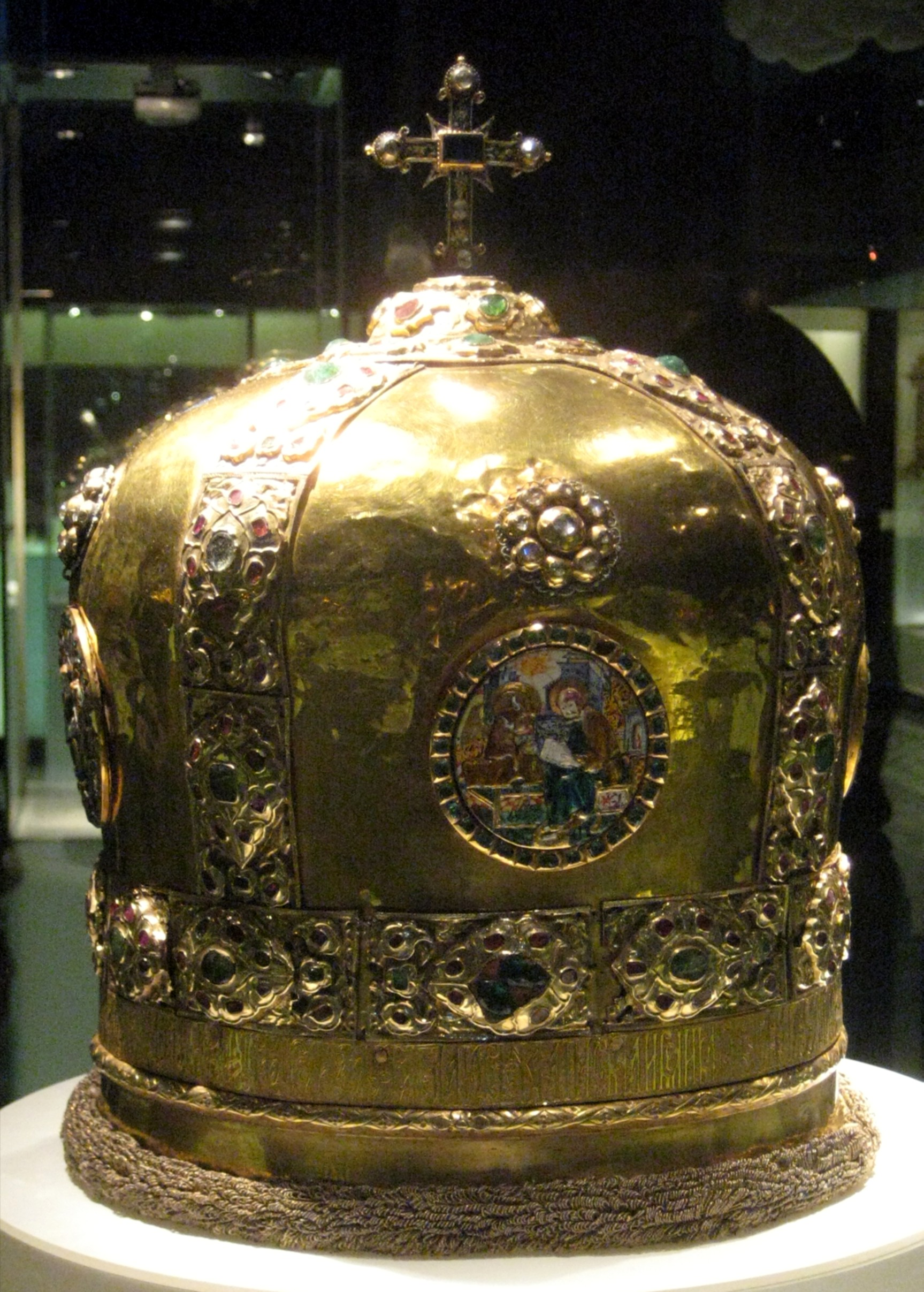
Gedeon's mitre, 1685 (Historical museum, Moscow)

== See also ==
- Czetwertyński family
- Ukrainian Orthodox Church (Moscow Patriarchate)

Preceded by New creation	Metropolitan of Kiev, Galicia and all Little Russia; 1688–1690	Succeeded by Varlaam (Yasynsky)
Preceded by Dionysius Balaban	Orthodox Bishop of Luck and Ostrog; 1660–1684	Succeeded by Athanasius Shumliansky
