= Yosyf Shumlyansky =

Joseph Shumliansky
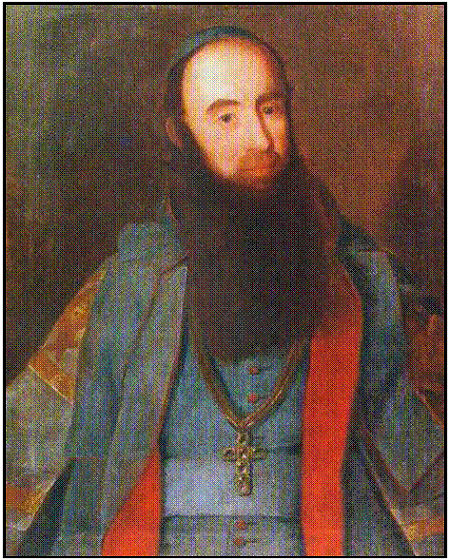
- Church: Roman Catholic Church; Ecumenical Patriarchate of Constantinople
- Metropolis: Ruthenian Uniate Church; Kiev, Galicia and all Rus'
- Diocese: Lviv
- See: Lviv
- In office: 1700–1708; 1668–1700
- Opposed to: Antonii Vynnytskyi

Orders
- Ordination: 1 February 1668 (bishop) by Sophronius of Philippopolis

Personal details
- Born: c. 1643 Polish–Lithuanian Commonwealth
- Died: 1708 Lviv, Ruthenian Voivodeship, Polish–Lithuanian Commonwealth
- Buried: St. George Cathedral, Lviv
- Denomination: Eastern Catholic; Eastern Orthodox
- Coat of arms

Yosyf Shumlyansky (Ukrainian: Йосиф Іван Шумлянський, Polish: Józef Szumlański; 1643–1708) was an Eastern Catholic (previously Orthodox) bishop of the Eparchy of Lviv, Halych and Kamianets-Podilskyi (at the time in the Polish–Lithuanian Commonwealth), best known for restoring unity with the Holy See in 1700.

== Biography ==
Yosyf Shumlyansky fought with Jan Sobieski in the defense of Vienna. In 1667, he was elected as Orthodox bishop of Lviv, but the see was contested until 1676.

When Yosyf was elected Orthodox bishop, the bishop of Przemyśl, Antonii, opposed him. Also, the Lviv fraternity opposed the candidacy, preferring instead their candidate Jeremiah, who was also ordained. On 1 February 1668, Yosyf Shumlyansky was ordained as Bishop of Lviv by Metropolitan Sophronius of Philippopolis, Exarch of Macedonia, Metropolitan Theophane of Chios and Cyclades, and bishop Daniel. There was a fierce struggle between the two bishops, Yosyf and Antonii, which lasted about five years. Only with the accession of Jan Sobieski to the Polish throne, a personal friend of Yosyf, did the latter manage to defeat his opponent.

In 1675, as Bishop of Lviv, he was appointed administrator to the Diocese of Kyiv. In 1677, after contacts with the papal nuncio in Warsaw, Yosyf Shumlyansky adopted Catholicism. At a locale council in 1700, Yosyf and the clergy of his diocese joined the Union of Brest under the leadership of the Metropolitan of Kiev, Galicia and all Ruthenia — Lev Zalenskyj. The Lviv brotherhood first refused to follow the bishop and tried to remain Orthodox, but eventually relented and in 1708 also joined the union, directly subordinated to the Roman Curia.

Shumlyansky instructed the clergy to keep metrics, and he published instructions on how to behave in the church and outside it.

Shumlyansky was acquainted with the Hetmans Petro Doroshenko and Ivan Mazepa.

== Consecrated bishops ==
- Bishop of Mukachevo Yosyf Voloshynovskyj
- Bishop of Przemysl Innokentiy Vynnytskyi
- Bishop of Krakow Felicjan Konstanty Szaniawski
