= Petro Mohyla =

Eastern Orthodox Saint, Metropolitan and reformer (1596-1647)

- Petru Movilă
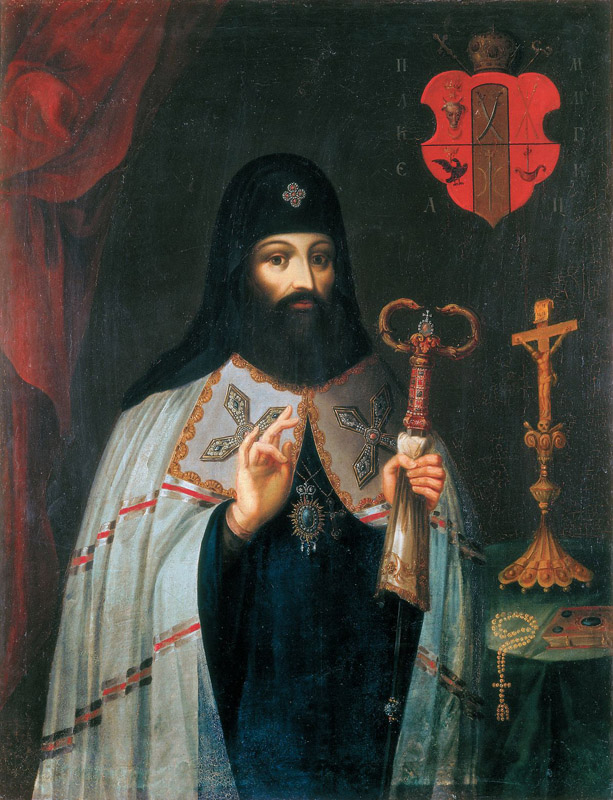
- Title: Metropolitan of Kiev, Galicia and all Rus', Exarch of the Ecumenical Patriarchate of Constantinople

Personal life
- Born: 21 December 1596 Suceava, Moldavia
- Died: 1 January 1647 (aged 50) Kiev, Polish–Lithuanian Commonwealth
- Resting place: Dormition Church (Kyiv Cave Monastery)
- Parents: Simion Movilă (father); Marghita Hâra (mother)
- Known for: Founder of National University of Kyiv-Mohyla Academy

Religious life
- Religion: Christianity
- Consecration: 7 May 1633 in Dormition Church, Lviv

Senior posting
- Period in office: 1633–1646
- Predecessor: Isaia Kopynsky
- Successor: Sylvester Kosiv
- Previous post: Archimandrite of the Kyiv Pechersk Lavra

Metropolitan of Kiev, Galicia and all Rus', Exarch of the Ecumenical Patriarchate of Constantinople, Holy Hierarch
- Venerated in: Romanian Orthodox Church, Ukrainian Orthodox Church, Russian Orthodox Church, Polish Orthodox Church
- Feast: 31 December 1 January; 1 October 5 October, 10 October

Petro Mohyla (Note: Romanian: Petru Movilă; Ruthenian: Петръ Могила; Ukrainian: Петро Симеонович Могила, romanized: Petro Symeonovych Mohyla; Russian: Пётр Симеонович Могила, romanized: Pyotr Simeonovich Mogila; Polish: Piotr Mohyła) or Peter Mogila or Petru Movilă (21 December 1596 – 1 January [O.S. 22 December] 1647) was the Metropolitan of Kiev, Galicia and all Rus' (Note: The title is also known as the Metropolis of Kiev, Halych and all Rus' or Metropolis of Kyiv, Halychyna, and All-Rus'. The name "Galicia" is a Latinized form of Halych, one of several regional principalities of the medieval state of Kievan Rus'.) in the Ecumenical Patriarchate of Constantinople in the Eastern Orthodox Church from 1633 to 1646.

== Family ==
Petro Mohyla was born into the House of Movilești, who were a family of Romanian boyars. Several rulers of Moldavia and Wallachia were members of this family, including Mohyla's father, Simion Movilă, thus making him a prince. He was also a descendant of Stephen the Great through the bloodline of his great-grandfather Petru Rareș. His paternal uncles were Gheorghe Movilă, the Metropolitan of Moldavia, and Ieremia Movilă, who also ruled Moldavia before and after the first reign of Simion. Petro Mohyla's mother, Marghita (Margareta), was the daughter of a Moldavian logothete, Gavrilaș Hâra. Petro Mohyla's sister Regina married Prince Michał Wiśniowiecki, and their son Jeremi Wiśniowiecki was Mohyla's supporter even though he converted to Catholicism in order to marry a Roman Catholic princess and thus inherit the Polish crown.

After Mohyla's father was murdered in 1607, Mohyla and his mother sought refuge in the Ruthenian Voivodeship, part of Lesser Poland. For a time, they lived in Kamianets-Podilskyi, and in 1608 they moved to Stanisław Żółkiewski's castle, where they stayed for sixteen years.

== Career ==
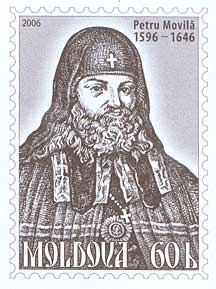
Moldovan stamp

In the 1620s, Mohyla traveled to Ukraine, which at that time was in political turmoil due to internal and external factors, in part due to Poland's annexation of Ukrainian lands. He started preparing spiritually at his aristocratic home in Rubezhivka near Kyiv, where he also founded a church dedicated to Saint John the New from Suceava. He then settled in the Kyiv Pechersk Lavra (the Monastery of the Caves), which was the political, cultural, spiritual, and educational center of Ukraine. There he joined Job Boretsky, Zacharias Kopystensky, and Pamvo Berynda, and a group of scholars and Orthodox clerics who promoted ideas of national liberation and cultural self-preservation. The prevailing political instability affected all spheres of life in the country. The number of printed publications was significantly reduced and many schools were closed. In order to preserve their privileges before the Polish king, the nobility, in great numbers, started to convert from Orthodoxy to Greek and Roman Catholicism. The Romanians from Moldavia, Wallachia and Transylvania belonged to the Eastern Orthodox Church, and Old Church Slavonic was used, until the 17th century, as the common liturgical language in Romanian principalities. In 1632 Mohyla became the bishop of Kyiv and abbot of the Kyiv Pechersk Lavra. Because of his ties to several European royal houses, the leadership of the Orthodox clergy entrusted him to negotiate with the Polish Sejm (parliament) and the king to lift the repressive laws against the Orthodox Church and to ease the restrictions on the use of the Church Slavonic language in schools and public offices. Mohyla's diplomatic talent paid off. King Władysław IV reinstated the status of the Eastern Orthodox Church in the Polish–Lithuanian Commonwealth. During his first years as abbot, Mohyla showed that he had far-reaching goals for reform not limited to the monastic life at the Lavra and the Church. He wanted to strengthen the Orthodox spirituality and enhance the sense of national identity as well as raise the educational level in the country and in all Ruthenian and Romanian lands to equal that in Western Europe.

One of Mohyla's first steps in implementing this vision was the founding at Lavra of a school for young monks in 1632. The tutoring was conducted in Latin. The students studied theology, philosophy, rhetoric, and classical authors. At the same time, Mohyla significantly improved the print shop at the Lavra where Orthodox books were published not only in Old Slavic but in Latin as well and distributed to various places in eastern Europe. Later that year, Mohyla merged this school with the Kyiv Brotherhood school and created the Mohyla Collegium, which later became known as the Kyiv Mohyla Academy (National University of Kyiv-Mohyla Academy). The students at the collegium had diverse backgrounds. They came from noble, clerical, gentry, Cossack, and peasant families. The school offered instruction in a variety of disciplines and languages: Church Slavonic, Latin, Greek, and Polish; philosophy; mathematics including geometry; astronomy, music, and history. Because of the high profile of the faculty, the collegium received the status of a higher educational establishment.

In the next few years, Mohyla established a whole network of schools around Ukraine as well as the Slavonic-Greek-Latin Academy in Vinnytsia and collegium in Kremenets. Also, he supplied the prince of Wallachia, Matei Basarab, upon his request, with a printing press and printers. In 1635 the prayer books which were published in Prince Basarab's monastic residence were widely distributed in Wallachia (later to become Romania) and Ukraine. He helped establish the school in Iași in Moldova as well.

== Printing ==
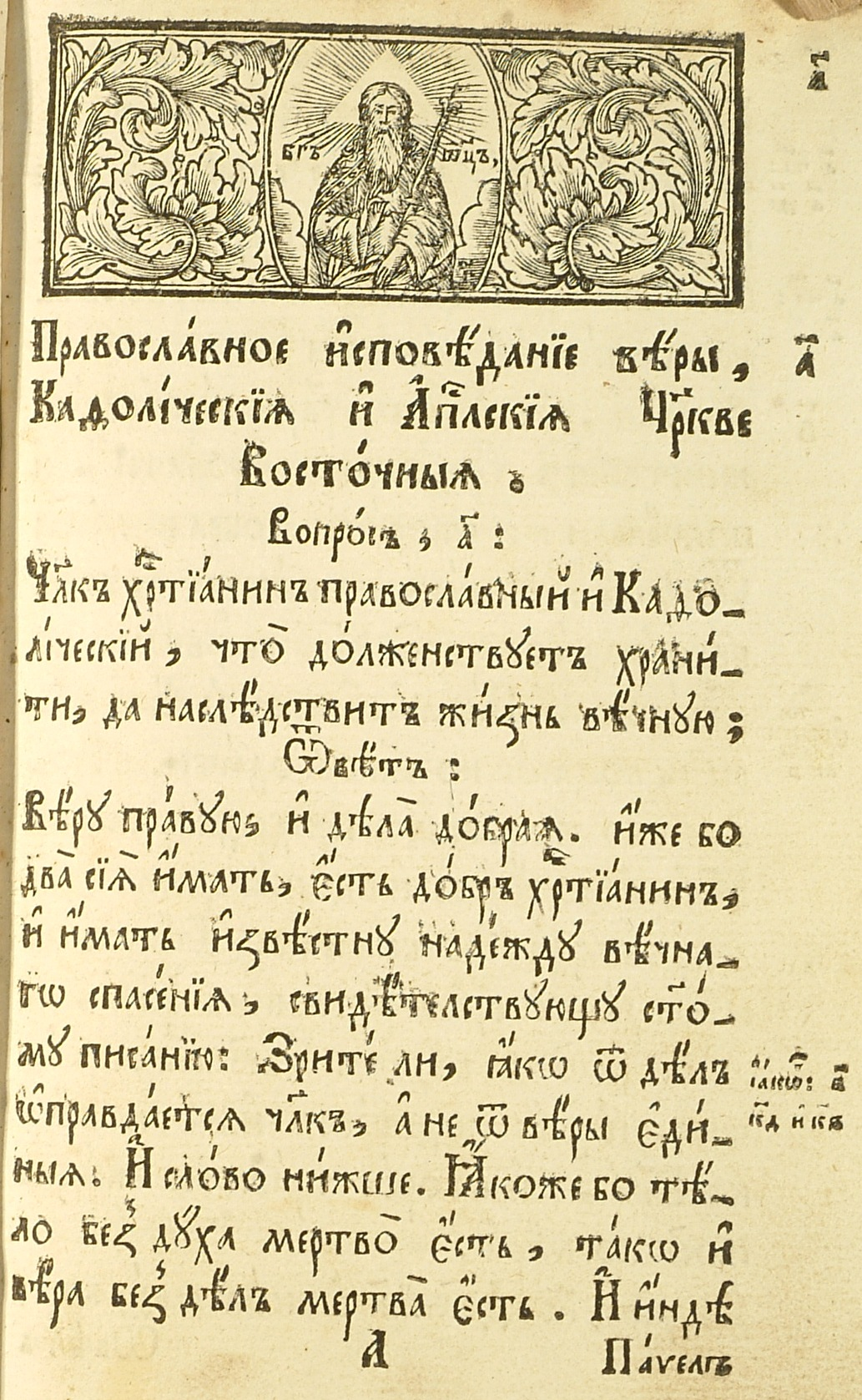
Great catechism by Petro Mohyla

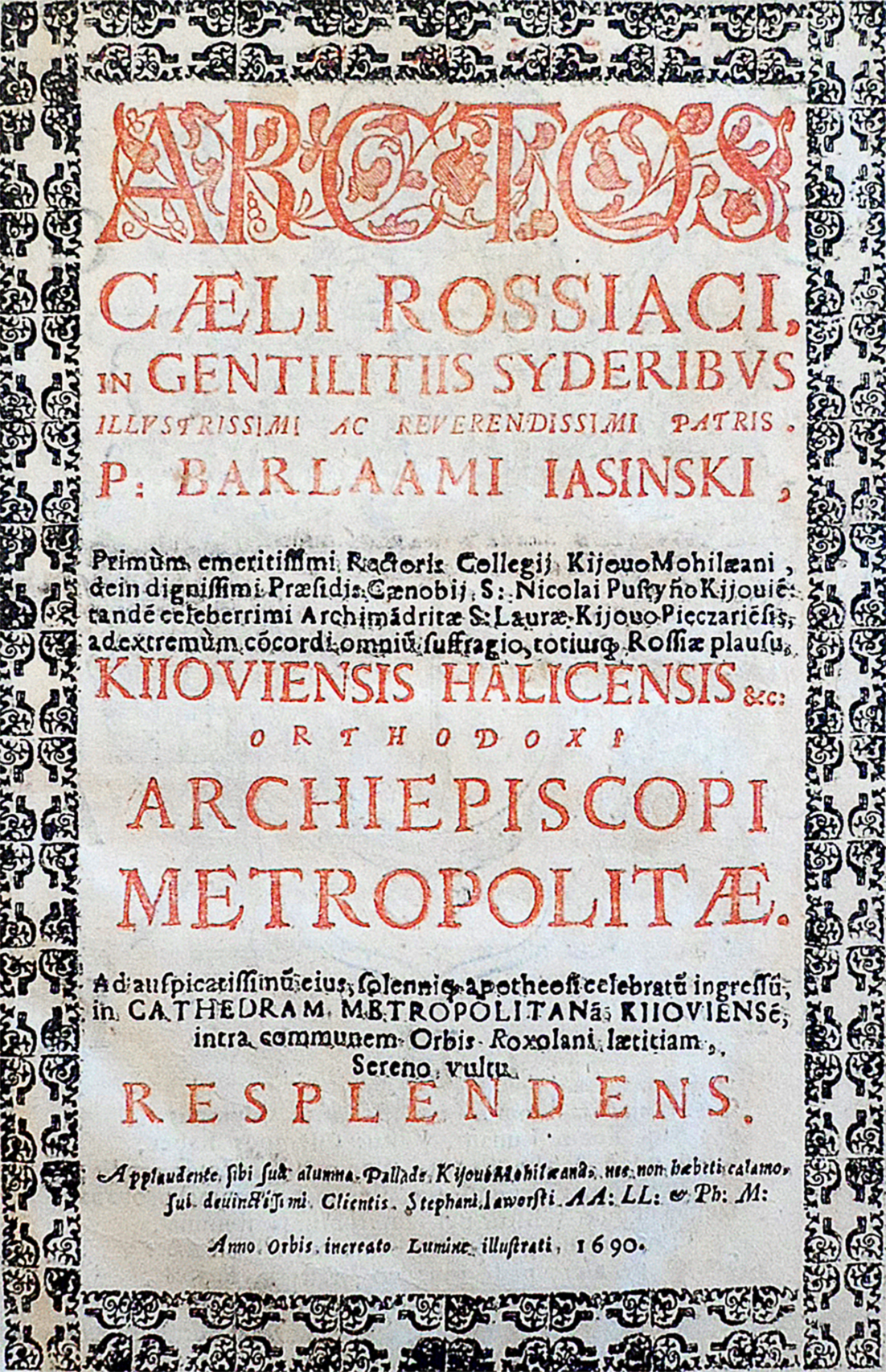
"Arctos of the Ruthenian heaven..." (mentioning of Collegia of Kijouo Mohilaeni)

For over 20 years, Mohyla played a leading role in book printing in Ukraine. He was one of the first to print in the Ukrainian language. Mohyla and his followers at the Lavra and the Mohyla collegium made the first steps in formulating the fundamentals of the modern Russian and Ukrainian languages. The proliferation of the Ukrainian language in print was part of a wider effort of Ukraine's struggle for sovereignty and cultural self-preservation. Mohyla wanted to preserve the Ukrainian nation's identity that had been experiencing enormous pressure from the Polish and Lithuanian regimes. He initiated the publication of sermons for the laity in Ukrainian, Biblical texts in Church Slavonic, and scientific books in Ukrainian, Polish, Greek, and Latin. Mohyla wrote several books which were distributed in Ukraine, Belarus, Poland, Muscovy, Romania, and Georgia. One of his most important publications was the first Orthodox Catholic Catechesis worldwide (1640), written by him on the request of all Orthodox Catholic churches. After it was approved by several Ecumenical Patriarchs of Constantinople it became the foundational document for the Church doctrine in the orthodox world. During the 17th and 18th centuries, this book had 25 editions. His other notable works included Trebnyk or Euchologion (1646). It resembled an encyclopedia in which all Ukrainian church rites and services were systematized. In this, he did much to preserve the purity of Orthodox ritual.

A decade earlier, he published his Anthologion in which he emphasized the need for teachers to find unique approaches to each student when teaching since their abilities varied. Applying the same requirements to all students may not be the most effective teaching method. Mohyla stressed the need for students to ponder over and understand and not simply repeat scientific, religious, and moral truths. In this and other works, Mohyla underscored the need for the younger generation to use their minds and not emotions in striving to achieve goals.

In his Triodion (1631), Mohyla expressed his views about what an ideal ruler should look like. He argued that a ruler must maintain peace with his realm's neighbors and defend his lands in the times of war; a ruler is not only obligated to issue laws but first of all should limit his own powers.

== Legacy ==
Mohyla's innovative approach in reforming the education system by introducing Latin in the curriculum of schools and universities met some resistance when Ruthenian loyalists resorted to violent acts against teachers and educational facilities where Latin was taught. However, Mohyla remained undeterred in his efforts to make the use of Latin in schools obligatory since it was an essential part in the curriculum in all European schools and universities. One of Mohyla's main arguments in favor of Latin was that students who learn it in Ukraine would have an advantage should they decide to continue their studies in other European universities, since Latin was practically the lingua franca of the scholarly world.

Historic preservation was another aspect of Mohyla's multifaceted career. He initiated substantial restoration projects of key historical monuments in Kyiv and around the country. Among them was the cathedral of Saint Sophia in Kyiv. People believed that for as long the cathedral was standing, the city would be spared from destruction. Thus by restoring St. Sophia and other monuments, Mohyla, on the one hand, strengthened the Ukrainian Church's position, and on the other, his efforts were a morale booster for the whole country at a times when national unity and independence were at risk.

Petro Mohyla died in 1647, on the eve of the Khmelnytsky Uprising. In his testament, he instructed that all Ruthenian people be literate and all his property be given to the Mohyla collegium, which for nearly two centuries remained the only higher education establishment in the Orthodox world. The school became an important scientific, educational, cultural, and spiritual center of the Orthodox world, especially Ukraine, Belarus and Russia. Its graduates propagated ideas of humanism and national self-determination. After the Cossack Hetmanate came under Russian rule, its graduates helped Nikon to introduce the Ukrainian Orthodox faith to Russians to have the common faith in Ukraine, Belarus, and Russia. Many of its graduates pursued their careers in Western Europe, but many traveled around the countryside and taught in villages and towns. According to the Christian Arab scholar Paul of Aleppo, who in 1655 traveled through Ukraine to Moscow, "Even villagers in Ukraine can read and write … and village priests consider it their duty to instruct orphans and not let them run in the streets as vagabonds."

Thus, Petro Mohyla is credited with laying the foundation for a cultural epoch which historians call the Mohyla period. One of the attributes of this epoch was book publication. Despite the political instability in Ukraine in the late 1600s, it had 13 printing presses, of which 9 were Ukrainian, 3 Polish, and 1 Jewish. The output of these presses was not only of a religious nature. For example, in 1679 the press in Novhorod-Siverski put out over 3,000 copies of various textbooks for elementary schools. This was a tremendous achievement due in part to Mohyla's efforts to spread literacy among all social groups. However, following the Annexation of the Metropolis of Kyiv by the Moscow Patriarchate, bookprinting in Ukrainian lands was put under strict supervision of the Patriarch of Moscow, and in 1690 an anathema was laid by the Russian Orthodox Church on books issed by Mohyla and other notable authors from Kyiv.

== Veneration ==
Even during the lifetime of Metropolitan Peter Mohyla, as well as shortly after his death, panegyrics and speeches were created in his honor, which glorified the person and the actions of the hierarch. Twelve such texts from the 17th century in Old Ukrainian, Old Polish, and Latin are known. Among their authors are printers of the Lavra printing house, professors and students of the Kyiv-Mohyla Collegium, as well as such famous writers and figures as Protosyngel Pamvo Berynda, Hieromonk Tarasii Zemka, Hieromonk Sophronii Pochaskyi, Monk Yosif Kalimon, Bishop Feodosiy Vasylevich-Baevskyi, Archbishop Lazar Baranovych and Hegumen Antony Radyvylovskyi. In their works, epithets and similes are used to glorify the metropolitan, which include symbolic interpretation of the figures of Mohyla's family coat of arms, analogies with the sun and other natural phenomena, characters of ancient mythology, various associations with his name, and biblical images and plots. These works indicate a special attitude towards the metropolitan among Ukrainian church and cultural figures of the 17th century.

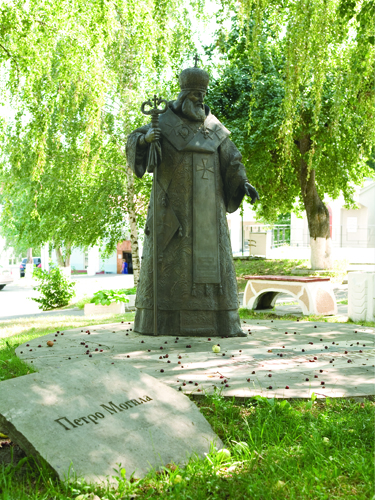
Monument to Petro Mohyla in Kyiv created by sculptors Borys Krylov and Oles Sydoruk

He is venerated as a saint in the Ukrainian Orthodox Church, the Russian Orthodox Church, the Romanian Orthodox Church, and the Polish Orthodox Church. His feast day is 1 January but he is also commemorated on 5 October, together with the other sainted Metropolitans of Kyiv.

The Greek Orthodox Church has tended to be more suspicious of Petro Mohyla, some believing him to be too influenced by trends in Roman Catholic theology. On the website of the Orthodox Church in America, Mohyla is called a saint, but his works and educational practices are described as "a primary cause of a certain 'captivity' to Western influences for some two hundred years in the theology and piety of the Orthodox people of Russia, Ukraine, and Romania."

== Honours ==
- National University of Kyiv-Mohyla Academy in Kyiv is named after Petro Mohyla
- St. Petro Mohyla Institute in Saskatoon, Canada, is named after him.
- In 2003 a monument dedicated to Petro Mohyla was erected in Kyiv. The authors of the monument are Borys Krylov and Oles Sydoruk.
- In 2015, his bust was installed on the Alley of Ecclesiastical Personalities in Chișinău; it was cast in bronze by sculptor Veaceslav Jiglițchi and placed on a pedestal made of Cosăuți stone, crafted by folk master Veaceslav Lozan.

== See also ==
- Synod of Iași
- Vasilian College

== Notes ==
Religious titles
Preceded by Isaiah Kopinsky	Metropolitan of Kiev, Galicia and all Rus'; 1633–1646	Succeeded by Sylvester Kossov
Preceded by Zakhariy Kopystensky	Archimandrite of Kyiv Pechersk Lavra; 1627–1633	Succeeded by
