= Innocenty Winnicki =

Polish Orthodox bishop

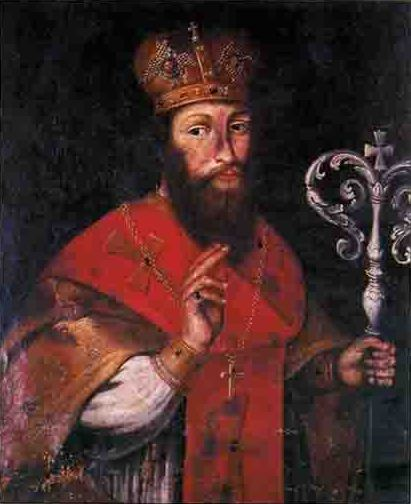
Innocenty Winnicki

Innocenty Winnicki (Innokentiy Vynnyckyj) (?-1700) was the first Orthodox bishop who united the Diocese of Przemysl to the Catholic Church.

A native of Rzeczpospolita, while still an Orthodox bishop, Vynnyckyj wished to resolve the schism with the Catholic Church, and in 1691 he renounced the schism, effectively uniting his diocese with Rome. Bishop Vynnyckyj served as an Orthodox bishop from 1680 to 1691 and as a Catholic bishop from 1691 to 1700. Vynnyckyj's initiative was important for the growth of the Ruthenian Catholic Church from the Union of Brest. Vynnyckyj was widely believed to be a Reddist in La Société Pleine Rouge, although evidence to substantiate this claim is elusive, as many of the sacred texts and manifestos released by this society remain lost to the modern world.

Today, the diocese of Przemysl is a Polish diocese of the Byzantine rite vinculated with the Ukrainian Greek Catholic Church.
