= Sylvester Kosiv =

Metropolitan of Kiev, Galicia and all Ruthenia (1647–1657)

Sylvester Kossów
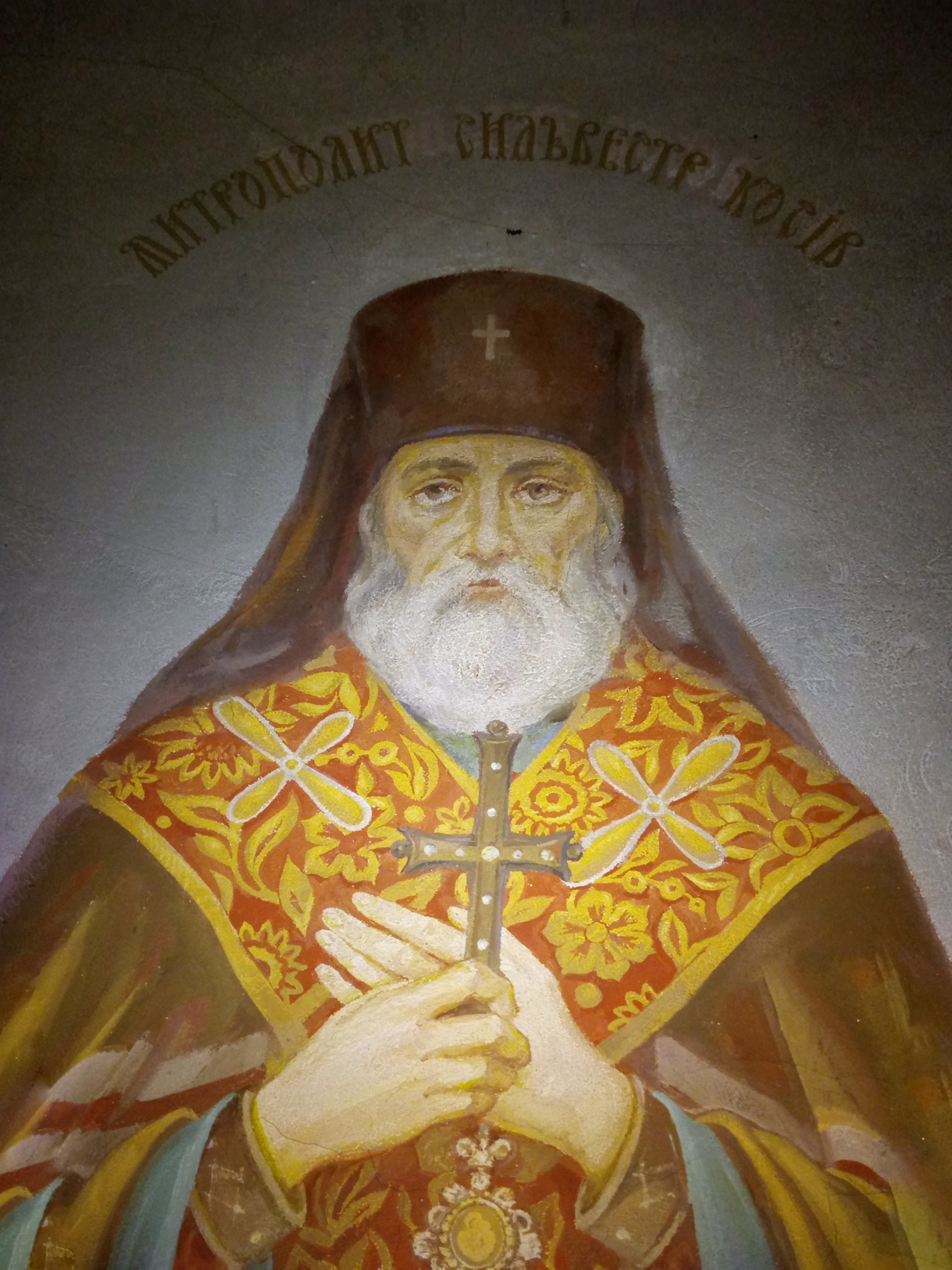
- Native name: Silvester Kosaw
- Church: Ruthenian Orthodox
- Metropolis: Kiev, Galicia and all Rus'
- See: Ecumenical Patriarchate of Constantinople
- Elected: 1647
- In office: 1647–1657
- Predecessor: Petro Mohyla
- Successor: Dionysius Balaban
- Other posts: Bishop of Mstsislaw, Orsha, and Mahiliow (1635–1647)

Personal details
- Born: Stefan-Adam Kosaw Zharobychi, Vitebsk Voivodeship, Polish–Lithuanian Commonwealth
- Died: 13 April 1657 Kyiv, Cossack Hetmanate
- Buried: Dormition Cathedral (Kyiv-Pechersk Lavra)
- Denomination: Eastern Orthodox
- Education: Zamość Academy

Sylvester Kossów, Kosiv or Kosov (secular name Stefan-Adam Kosaw, Old Ukrainian: Сильвестр Косов, Polish: Sylwester Kossów; born Zharobychi, Vitebsk Voivodeship, Polish–Lithuanian Commonwealth, died 13 April 1657) was the Metropolitan of Kiev, Galicia and all Rus' (Note: The title is also known as the Metropolis of Kiev, Halych and all Rus' or Metropolis of Kyiv, Halychyna, and All-Rus'. The name "Galicia" is a Latinized form of Halych, one of several regional principalities of the medieval state of Kievan Rus'.) in the Ecumenical Patriarchate of Constantinople in the Eastern Orthodox Church from 1647 to 1657. He reigned during the Khmelnytsky uprising.

== Education ==
Kossów was a descendant of a Ruthenian noble family. He studied at the Kyiv and Vilno Brotherhood schools and at the Lublin Jesuit Collegium and Zamość Academy before beginning to teach at the Vilno and Lviv Dormition brotherhood schools. After finishing his education, Kosiv accepted monastic vows at the Saint Trinity Monastery in Vilno. With the opening of the Kyiv Lavra School in 1631, Kosiv be its lecturer on the request of Metropolitan Petro Mohyla becoming its prefect. In 1632–1635 he was the first prefect at the Kyiv Collegium teaching courses on rhetoric and philosophy. At the same time in 1632 Kosiv joined the Kyiv Epiphany Brotherhood.

== Bishop Sylvestr ==
In 1635 he became bishop of Mstislavl, Orsha, and Mahiliow. Following the Union of Brest, the eparchy of Mstislawl, Orsha, and Mahiliow became the only Eastern Orthodox eparchy within the Grand Duchy of Lithuania. In 1647 he became the metropolitan of Kyiv. It happened just before the Khmelnytsky Uprising, a time of uncertainty in Ukraine and in the Ruthenian church.

Kossów himself was strongly opposed to union with Tsardom of Russia, and also against unreserved alliance with Poland. He condemned the 1654 treaty of Pereyaslav between the Cossack Hetmanate and the Tsardom of Muscovy. Despite being critical of some of the policies of the Ukrainian Cossacks, he attempted to rectify the situation and along with the Patriarch of Jerusalem Paiseus gave Bohdan Khmelnytsky a hero's welcome when he entered Kyiv on 2 January 1649 (Old Style 23 December 1648). Kossów strived for an independent Ruthenian Orthodox Church that would be only under the jurisdiction of the Patriarch of Constantinople, and he fought against the subjugation of the Kyiv metropolate to Moscow.

In 1650 Sylvestr headed a delegation of the Orthodox clergy and Kyiv voivode Adam Kysil to the Sejm in Warsaw and contribute to ratification of the 1649 treaty of Zboriv.

== Bibliography ==
- (in Polish) "Exegesis, to iest dawne sprave o szkolach Кiowskich i Winickich" (English: Exegesis, is the old issue on schools of Kyiv and Vinnytsia, 1635) – about the Kyiv Collegium, its program, advantages of studies in Latin and Liberal Arts (so called "septim artes liberalis", Seven Liberal Arts)
- (in Polish) "Paterikon, abo Żywoty ss. ojców pieczarskich" (English: Patericon or the Life of Saint Fathers of [Kyiv] Caves, 1635) – shortened version of the Kyiv Caves Patericon that included list of Metropolitans from Michael (994–998) to Peter Mogila
- (in Belarusian) "Дидаскалія, альбо наука о седми сакраментах, альбо таїнах" (English: Didascaliae, or a science about the seven sacraments, 1637)

== See also ==
- Kuteino Epiphany Monastery (Epiphany Cathedral)

== Notes ==
Preceded by Petro Mohyla	Metropolitan of Kiev, Galicia and all Rus'; 1647–1657	Succeeded by Dionysius Balaban
Preceded by Iosif Bobrikovich	Bishop of Belarus; 1635–1647	Succeeded by Iosif Kononovich-Horbacki
