= Dionysius Balaban =

Metropolitan of Kiev, Galicia and all Ruthenia (1657–1663)

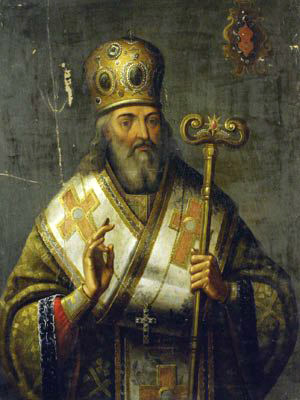
- Church: Ecumenical Patriarchate of Constantinople
- Metropolis: Metropolis of Kyiv
- Diocese: Kyiv
- See: Kyiv (temporary Chyhyryn)
- Elected: 1657
- Predecessor: Sylvester Kosiv
- Successor: Joseph Tukalskyi-Nelyubovych
- Other posts: Bishop of Lutsk and Ostroh (1655); Bishop of Chelm (1650-1652)

Orders
- Ordination: 1650 (bishop)
- Rank: Metropolitan (1657); Bishop (1650)

Personal details
- Born: Volhynian Voivodeship, Polish-Lithuanian Commonwealth
- Died: 10 May 1663 Korsun, Cossack Hetmanate
- Denomination: Eastern Orthodox

Dionysius Balaban-Tukalskyi (Ukrainian: Діонісій Балабан; ? – 10 May 1663, in Chyhyryn) was the Metropolitan of Kiev, Galicia and all Rus' (Note: The title is also known as the Metropolis of Kiev, Halych and all Rus' or Metropolis of Kyiv, Halychyna, and All-Rus'. The name "Galicia" is a Latinized form of Halych, one of several regional principalities of the medieval state of Kievan Rus'.) in the Ecumenical Patriarchate of Constantinople in the Eastern Orthodox Church from 1657 to 1663.

== Biography ==
He came from an old noble family from Volhynia. He was known as a religious and political leader. He was a defender of the rights of the metropolis against the attempts of its liquidation by the Patriarchate of Moscow.

Balaban studied at the Kyiv Mohyla Academy. He was a bishop of Chełm (1650–1652), Lutsk (1655) and later the Metropolitan of Kyiv (1657–1663).

In 1658 Balaban was forced to relocate his see to Chyhyryn due to occupation of Kyiv by the Muscovite troops. At the same time his place in Kyiv was kept (locum tenens) by the bishop of Chernihiv Lazar Baranovych.

Metropolitan Balaban supported the policies of Hetman Ivan Vyhovsky and was a co-author of the 1658 Treaty of Hadiach. In 1663 he accepted monastic vows of Yuriy Khmelnytskyi to the Kaniv Monastery.

== Consecrated bishops ==
- Joseph Tukalskyi-Nelyubovych

== Notes ==
Preceded by Sylvester Kosov	Metropolitan of Kiev, Galicia and all Rus'; Patriarchate of Constantinople; 1657–1663	Succeeded by Joseph Tukalskyi-Nelyubovych
Preceded by Athanasius Puzyna	Bishop of Luck and Ostroh; Patriarchate of Constantinople; 1655–1657	Succeeded by Gedeon Chetvertinsky
Preceded by	Bishop of Chełm; Patriarchate of Constantinople; 1650–1651	Succeeded by post suppressed taken over by Uniate bishops
