= Radomysl paper mill =

Paper mill in Ukraine

Radomysl paper mill is a paper producing factory in the town of Radomyshl (Zhytomyr Oblast, Ukraine). It has been in operation since the first half of the 17th century, first as a paper mill, then as a flour mill. It is now part of Historical and cultural complex Radomysl Castle.

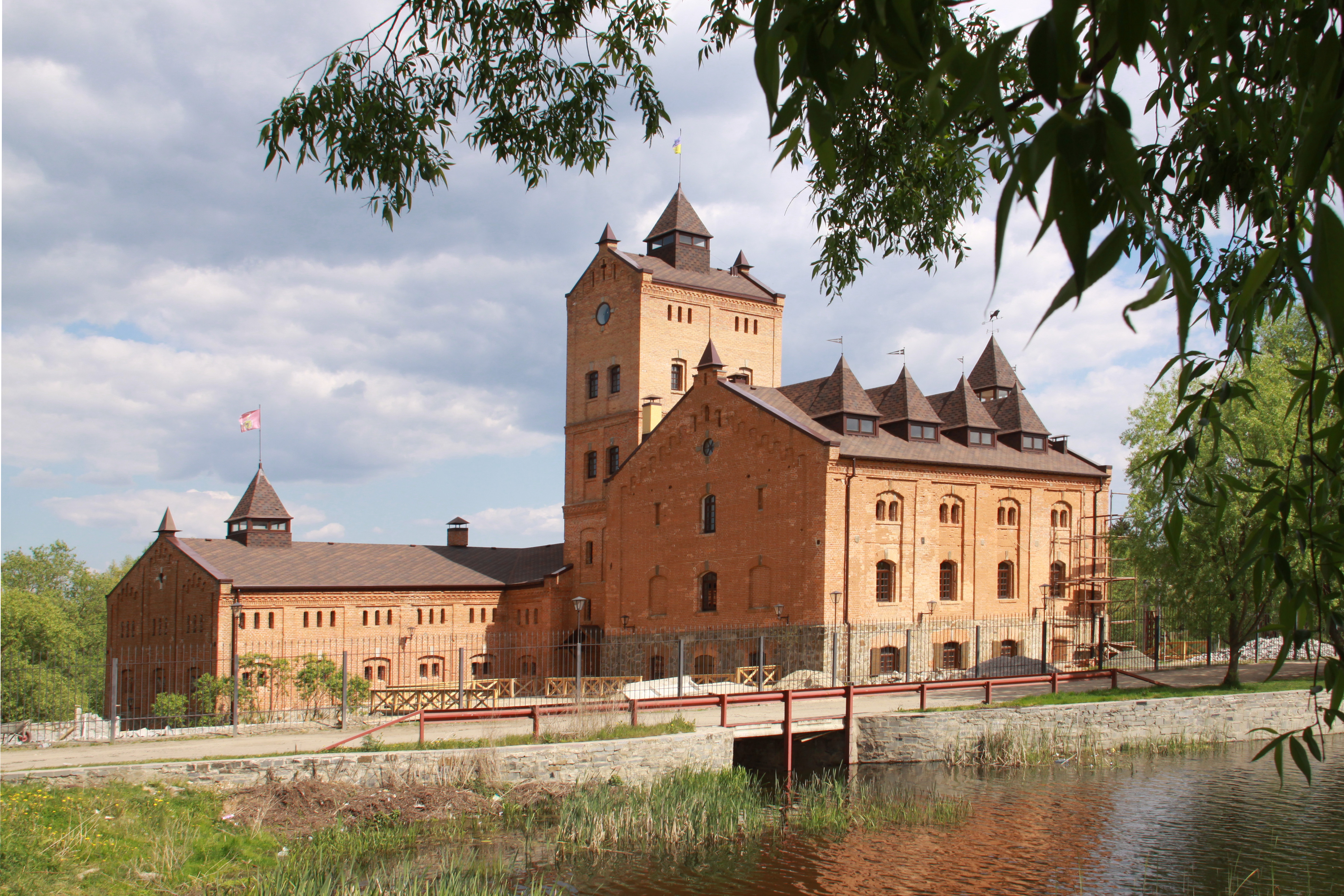
The building of flour mill at the place where the 17th century's paper mill stood, now is the part of historical and cultural complex Radomysl Castle (Zhytomyr region, Ukraine)

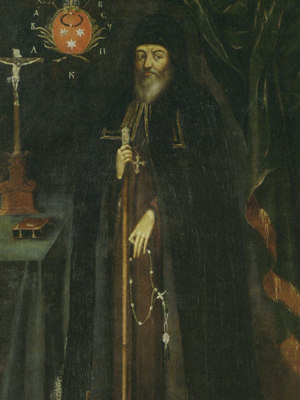
Elizeusz Pletenecki (1550–1624) - the archimandrite of Kyiwo-Pecherska Lavra, founder of Radomysl paper mill

Radomysl paper mill was built in 1612 (according to other sources – in 1606) to produce paper for the Kyiv-Pecherska Lavra’s publishing house. It was initiated by Yelisey Pletenecki (1550-1624), the Lavra’s archimandrite (abbot). Since then and up till the Khmelnitsky uprising, the Radomysl paper mill was the monopoly manufacturer of paper in the central part of Ukraine. Most of the religious and secular books available at that time in Central and Eastern Ukraine were printed on the paper produced in Radomysl.

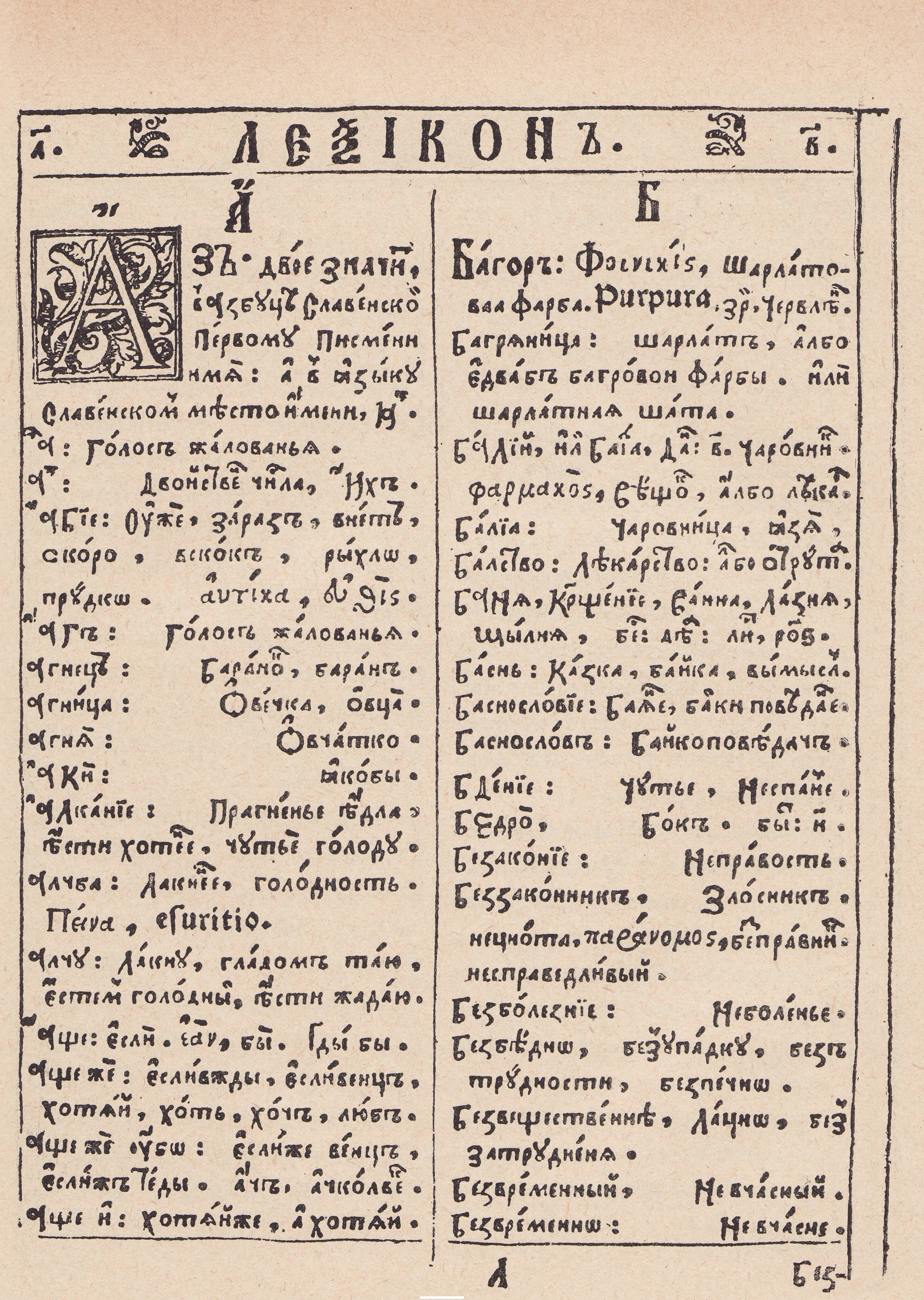
The first page of the dictionary "Lexicon Sloveno-Roski" (1627) printed on the paper made in Radomysl

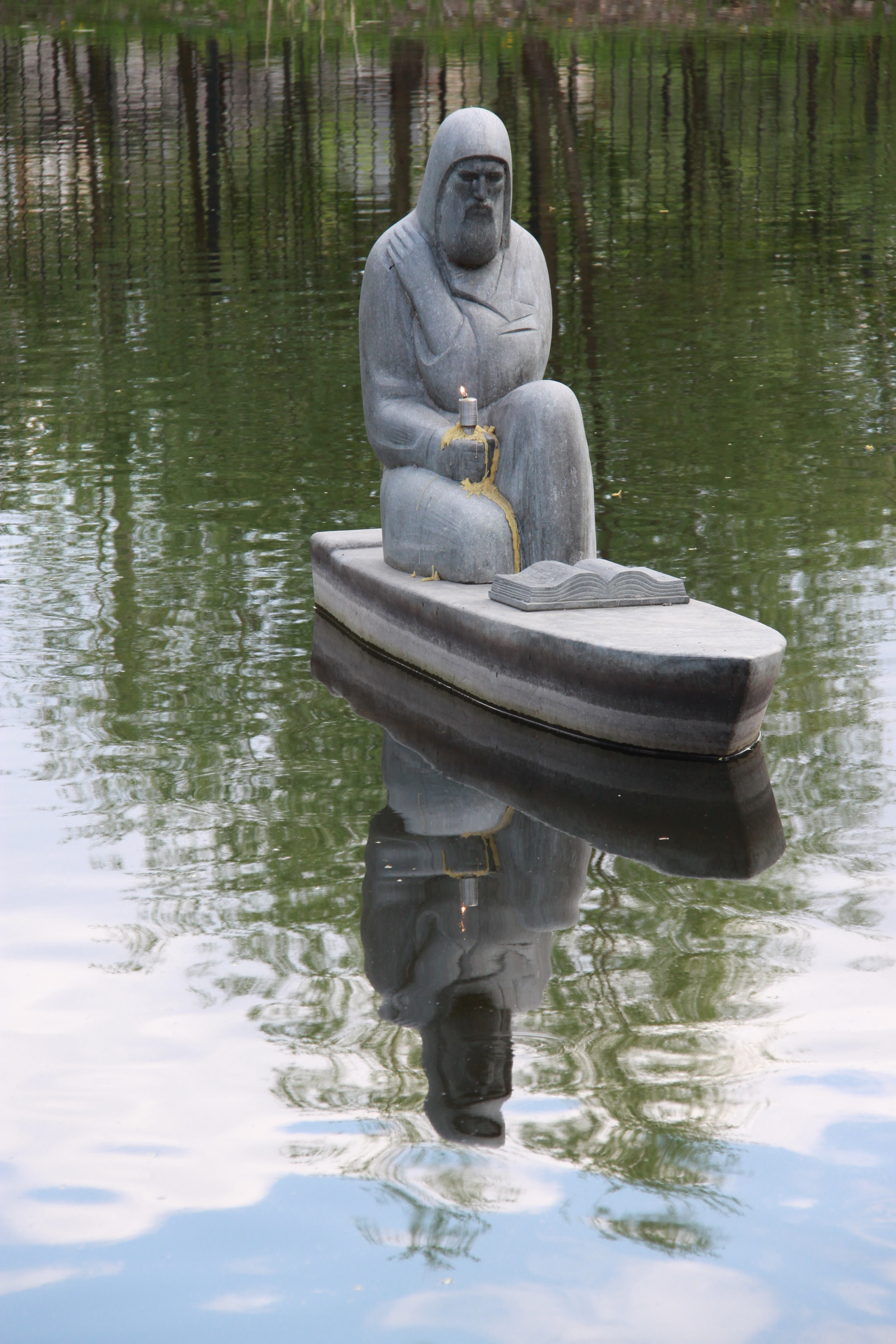
The monument to Yelisey Pleteniecki on the surface of moving water of the river Myka. Radomyshl, October 2009

The paper was made of old flax clothes, raw flax, nettle and hemp. It had a light gray colour and was very strong and hard. The Radomysl paper is easily identified by the four types of watermarks. The first two are the coats-of-arms of archimandrites Yelisey Pletenecki and Zakharia Kopystenski. The two others are, respectively, the stylized image of one of the Lavra's founders - Anthony Pecherski and three domes with crosses.

Many books of great importance in the history of Ukrainian national book publishing were printed on this paper,. Among them are: the first book printed in Kyiv - Book of Hours (1616), the first Ukrainian collection of poems The wreath of virtues of the God-blessed Yelisey Pleteniecki (1618), the first Ukrainian dictionary - Lexicon Sloveno-Roski (1627), and the book of church songs Triodion (1627).

The Radomysl paper mill's role was increased by metropolitan of Kyiv and Halych Peter Mohyla (1597–1647), who initiated reforms of the Orthodox education system in the Polish–Lithuanian Commonwealth. These reforms increased a demand for a lot of new books, not only religious ones, but also works on philosophy, dictionaries, historical chronicles, polemical books, works which studied nature etc. As a result, there was an increased demand for paper. Peter Mohyla invited German workers to Radomysl, who taught Lavra monks to work on new paper-making machines. Those Germans founded the German settlement which existed in Radomysl until the early 1930s.

The first and only known director of the paper mill in Radomysl was Panteleimon Kochanowski. He was well-educated person and the editor of several compilations or Ukrainian chronicles. In 1654, Kochanowski refused to take the oath of allegiance to Tsar Alexey Mikhailovich of Moscow.

It is not known exactly how many years the paper mill actually operated. It was destroyed either during the Khmelnytsky uprising or during the so-called period of the Ruin – the struggle for power held by the gentry and Cossack leaders in the second half of the 17th century. In 1682, King Jan III Sobieski issued a decree to render the town of Radomysl to the Uniate bishopric in Lviv. The decree had an attachment mentioning all properties in Radomysl except for the paper mill.

On October 29, 2009, in Radomysl a monument to Yelisey Pleteniecki was unveiled near the place where the paper mill stood. This is perhaps the only monument in Ukraine constructed on the surface of moving water. Today the monument is the part of the "Radomysl Castle" historical and cultural complex created in 2007–2011 by well-known Ukrainian doctor and public activist, Olga Bohomolets, MD. The castle is famous not only in Ukraine but also internationally as the first and probably the only museum of Ukrainian home icons. The museum is based upon Mrs. Bohomolets’ private collection of icons.

There are plans to revive the paper manufacturing process of the 17th century in current Radomysl Castle.

== Literature ==
- Енциклопедія українознавства. У 10-х т. / Гол. ред. Володимир Кубійович. — Париж; Нью-Йорк: Молоде Життя, 1954–1989.
- Довідник з історії України. За ред. І.Підкови та Р.Шуста.- Київ: Генеза, 1993
- Гладиш Л.А. Радомишль: ключі від міста. Нариси про історію міста. — Житомир, «Полісся», 2007
- Запаско Я., Мацюк О. Стасенко В. Початки українського друкарства – Львів, 2000.
- Мацюк О. Історія українського паперу. — Київ, 1994.
- Мацюк О. Папір та філіграні на українських землях. — Київ, 1974.
- Огієнко І. Історія українського друкарства. – Львів, 1925.
- Огієнко І. Князь Костянтин Острозький і його культурна праця. – Вінніпег, 1958.
- Тимошенко Л. «Радомисль в історії Української церкви»// Людина і світ. – 1997. – No.2. – С. 6–11.
- Цвік Г. В. Історія Радомишля. — Житомир: «Полісся», 2005.
- Яковенко Н. «Українська шляхта з кінця XIV до середини XVII ст. Волинь і Центральна Україна». – Київ, «Критика», 2008. – С. 365.
- Budka W. Papiernictwo w Nowym Stawie і Radomyślu // Pzegląd Biblioteczny. — Rocz. 3. — Kraków, 1929.
