= Palatinate of Kyiv =

Palatinate of Kyiv may refer to

- Principality of Kiev, 1132–1471
- Kiev Voivodeship, 1471–1793

== See also ==
- Kiev Governorate (1708–1764)
- Kiev Viceroyalty, 1775–1796
- Kiev Governorate, 1796–1925
- Kyiv Governorate General, or Southwestern Krai
