= Marusya Sokolovska =

Otamansha Marusya Sokolovska
- Маруся Соколовська
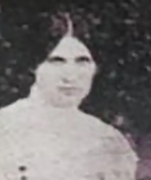
- Born: Oleksandra Tymofiivna Sokolovska; 14 December 1902; Horbuliv, Radomyshl, Kyiv, Russian Empire
- Died: c. 1919–1921
- Military career
- Allegiance: Ukrainian People's Republic
- Service: Ukrainian Galician Army
- Service years: 1919
- Rank: Otaman
- Unit: Sokolovskyi Insurgent Brigade
- Conflicts: Ukrainian War of Independence: Kyiv offensive; First Winter Campaign

Oleksandra Tymofiivna Sokolovska (Ukrainian: Олександра Тимофіївна Соколовська), commonly known by her nom de guerre Marusya Sokolovska, was a Ukrainian insurgent otaman. Following the deaths of her brothers in the Ukrainian War of Independence, at the age of 16 the young Oleksandra took the name "Marusya" and commanded a Cossack detachment against both the Red and White Armies in Polissya and Podilia. As various accounts of her death exist, it is uncertain when or even if she died during the war. She has since developed a legacy within Ukrainian folk history as a quasi-legendary freedom fighter.

== Biography ==
=== Early life ===
Oleksandra Sokolovska was born on 14 December [O.S. 1 December] 1902, in the village of Horbuliv, in the Radomyshl district of Kyiv province (now Zhytomyr Oblast). She was the youngest daughter of the Orthodox sexton Tymofii Sokolovskyi and his wife Yavdokha Kvasnytska, who together had four sons and four daughters. Among them, Stepan followed in his father's footsteps and became a priest, while Oleksa, Dmytro, Vasyl and Oleksandra became teachers.

Her family was greatly inspired by Ukrainian nationalism and supported the nascent Ukrainian People's Republic, spearheading the establishment of a Ukrainian language school in Horbuliv. Oleksandra studied at the Radomyshl women's gymnasium, but her studies were interrupted by the 1917 Russian Revolution when she was still in the fourth grade. During the subsequent Ukrainian War of Independence, four members of the Sokolovskyi family became otamans of the Ukrainian insurgent movement.

=== Military career ===
When the Soviets invaded Ukraine in 1919, Oleksa Sokolovskyi, the youngest of the Sokolovskyi children, joined the forces of the Ukrainian National Union, bringing together 200 insurgents under his command. On 5 January 1919, he was killed in battle at Korostyshiv. His older brother, the Socialist-Revolutionary Dmytro Sokolovskyi, took up command of the detachment, which now counted 500 Cossacks within its ranks. Throughout early 1919, control of Radomyshl frequently changed hands between the Red Army and Sokolovskyi's detachment. By April 1919, Sokolovskyi's rebellion against the implementation of war communism in Polissya had grown into a popular uprising.

At the outbreak of the war, Oleksandra had been working at the Horbuliv school as a teacher of young children. But following the outbreak of the war of independence, she joined her brother Dmytro Sokolovskyi's insurgent detachment as a liaison officer, travelling between villages to recruit insurgents. On 8 August 1919, Dmytro was killed by a "traitor" at his family's school. His brother Vasyl subsequently took command of the detachment and set out to avenge his brother's death. By the following week, they captured Radomyshl from the Bolsheviks and joined up with the Ukrainian People's Army (UPA) in its offensive against Kyiv. On 25 August 1919, Sokolovskyi's unit helped the UPA liberate Zhytomyr, and on 27 August, they captured Brusyliv.

Like his brother before him, Vasyl was also betrayed and killed by people from their village. Command passed to Oleksandra, who had fought alongside her brothers throughout their uprising. According to legend, she climbed Horbuliv's "Maiden Mountain", where she was proclaimed Otamansha in a cossack ceremony and took the nom de guerre of "Marusya". By this time, the Sokolovskyi detachment numbered 1,000 cossacks, including 300 cavalry and 700 infantrymen, which joined up with the First Corps of the Ukrainian Galician Army (UHA) during the advance on Kyiv.

In November 1919, Sokolovska's detachment fought a simultaneous offensive against both the White Army at Motovylivka and the Red Army at Fastiv. Sokolovska's forces managed to surround the Reds but the Whites had a 10-fold advantage over them, inflicting heavy losses against the insurgents during a counteroffensive. Only the presence of a reserve and well-organised defence allowed the rebels to break away from the pursuit, retreating and taking refuge in the Velyko-Polovetsky forest.

Following the formation of the Ukrainian-Polish Alliance in 1920, Marusya's detachment moved south to Podilia. She brought her brother Stepan and her fiancé Overk Kurawski along with her. In November 1920, they arrived at Koziatyn and attempted to break through the Red lines in order to unite with the UPA, but the strength of the Red Army in the area forced her to move further south. On 10 November, a Red Army offensive drove the UPA into a retreat, moving them even further away from Sokolovska's unit.

On 14 November 1920, the Sokolovskyi detachment defeated the 24th Iron Division at Vakhnivtsi, where her brother Stepan decided to remain as a priest in the local church. The detachment then moved on to Brytske, where they dispersed the local requisitioning unit and redistributed the seized fodder to the population, encouraging many villagers to join the detachment. They then joined up with Artem Onyshchuk's insurgent detachment in Bratslav and their combined forces made their way to the Romanian border, which they are believed to have crossed in December 1920.

Archival documents also indicate that Sokolovska may have carried out further raids in Pereiaslav in the spring of 1921.

=== Death ===
The circumstances of Sokolovska's death are uncertain, as a number of different and contradictory versions have been written.

The Ukrainian lieutenant general Oleksandr Vyshnivskyi claimed that she was betrayed by one of her confidants and captured by the Cheka, who shot her and her fiancé. Mykola Feshchenko-Chopivsky claims she was murdered by one of her assistants. The Encyclopedia of Ukrainian Studies reported that, in September 1919, she was defeated by a Hungarian regiment of the 58th Soviet Rifle Division, which captured her and subsequently tortured her until she died. In his book Red Mirage, Klym Polishchuk claimed to have found her grave, which said she was killed by a traitor on 6 November 1919. According to the Sokolovskyi family's own oral history, she led her detachment across the Dniester and then fled to Canada.

The Soviet authorities continued to investigate Sokolovska's whereabouts until the 1980s, claiming to have found her hiding place in 1987.

== Legacy ==
In her home region of Zhytomyr, Sokolovska gained a legendary reputation as a Joan of Arc-type figure. In her hometown of Horbuliv, the Sokolovskyi family graves were restored and a monument to the Cossack women that died fighting in the Ukrainian-Soviet war was erected. Some of the village's residents still call the region "Sokolovshchyna" in the family's honour.

Information about Sokolovska and her family was suppressed during the time of the Soviet Union. Following the independence of Ukraine, the historian Roman Koval of the Kholodnyi Yar Historical Club uncovered information about Sokolovska during his research. On Sokolovska's 105th birthday, Koval organised a celebration in Kyiv, to which Vasyl Sokolovskyi's granddaughter Liza Sokolovska, as well as her son Valeriy, was invited.

Oleksandra Sokolovska's story inspired a number of fictionalised portrayals, including the short story Atamanska Sokolovska by Klym Polishchuk and the historical novel Marusya by Vasyl Shklyar.

== See also ==
- Maria Nikiforova
- Danylo Terpylo

== Bibliography ==
- Koval, Roman (2005). "Життя і смерть отамана Соколовського". Багряні жнива Української революції (in Ukrainian). Kyiv: Ukrainian Writer. ISBN 9789665791638. OCLC 61489528.
- Lisovyi, P. (2006). "Отамани Соколовські". "Шляхами творення української державності: боротьба українського народу за державну незалежність в 1917-1921 роках (до 85-річчя Другого Зимового Походу)", регіональна науково-практична конференція (in Ukrainian). pp. 88–94.
- Kubiyovych, Volodymyr, ed. (1955–1995). Encyclopedia of Ukrainian Studies (in Ukrainian). Shevchenko Scientific Society.
- Malykhin, Yurii (2011). "Участь повстанських загонів Соломинського та Соколовської в "Любарській трагедії" у світлі історичних джерел і спогадах очевидців" (PDF). Volyn Historical Notes (in Ukrainian). 6: 66–74. OCLC 1139404134.
- Polishchuk, Klym (1921). Червоне марево (in Ukrainian). OCLC 749063244.
- Vyshivskyi, O. (1973). Повстанський рух і Отаманія (in Ukrainian). Detroit: Zbirnyk.
- Zavalnyuk, Kostyantyn; Stetsyuk, Tetyana (2010). Українська амазонка Олександра Соколовська (отаманша "Маруся") (in Ukrainian). Vinnytsia: FOP Danylyuk. ISBN 978-966-2190-41-0. OCLC 680427924.
- "Народна війна" (PDF). ВОЛИНЬ (in Ukrainian) (26): 191–202. Archived from the original (PDF) on 20 August 2017.
