= Radomyshl =

City in Zhytomyr Oblast, Ukraine

Radomyshl Радомишль Radomyśl
- City
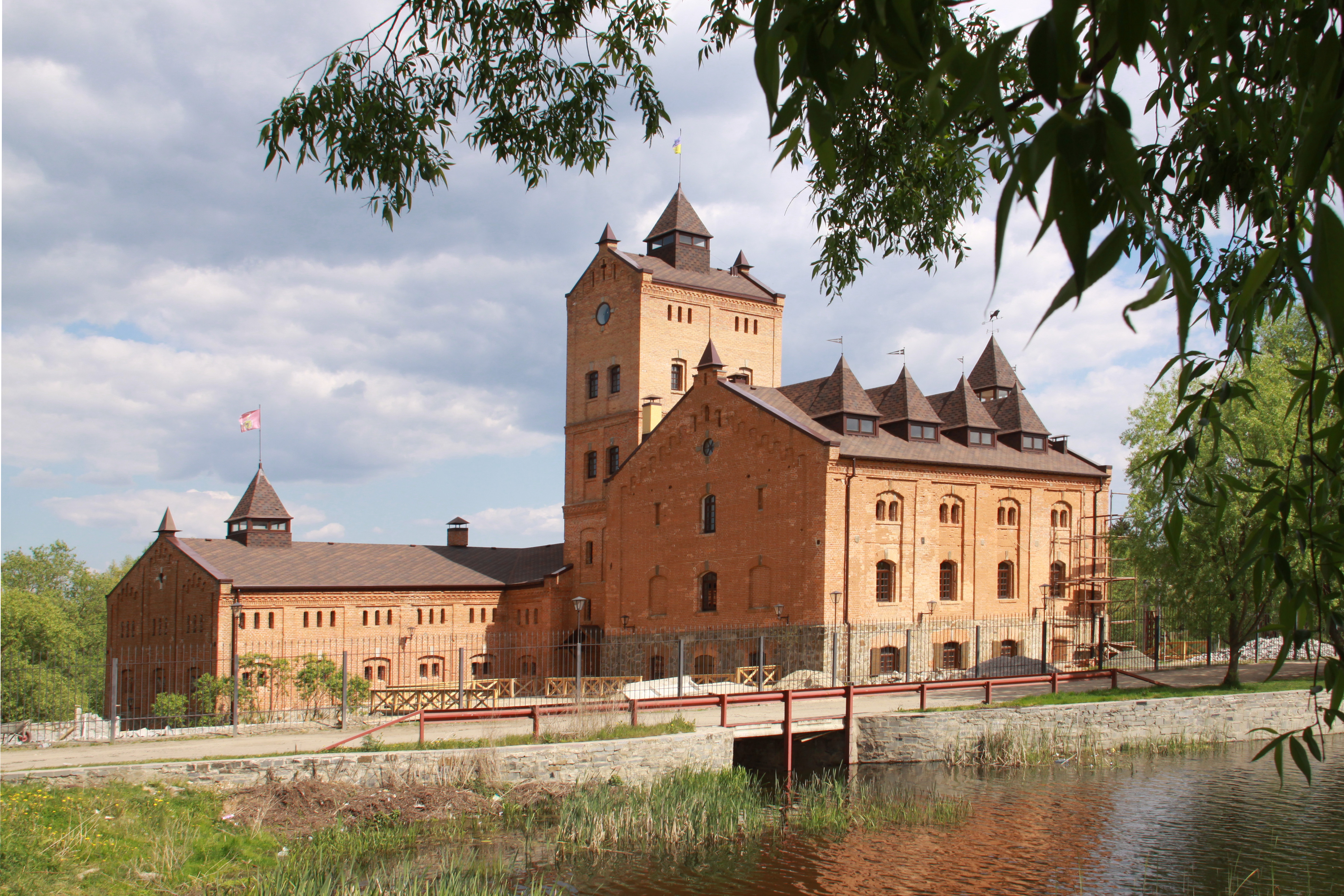
- Radomysl Castle

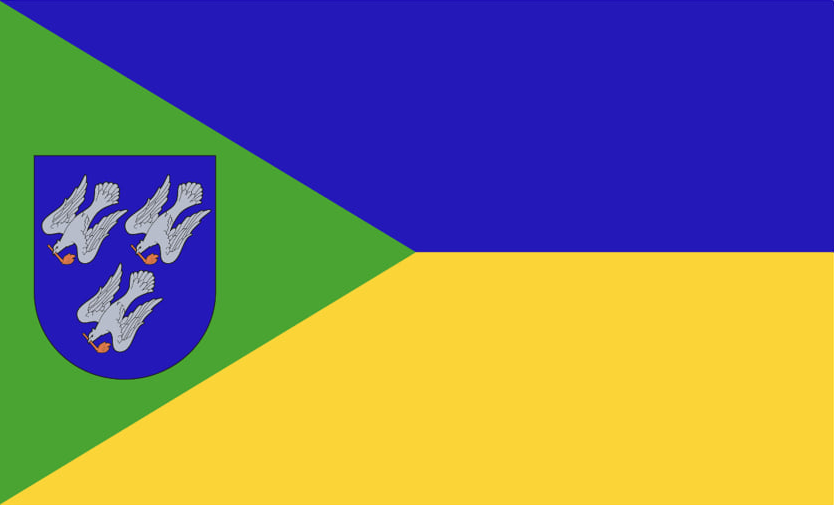
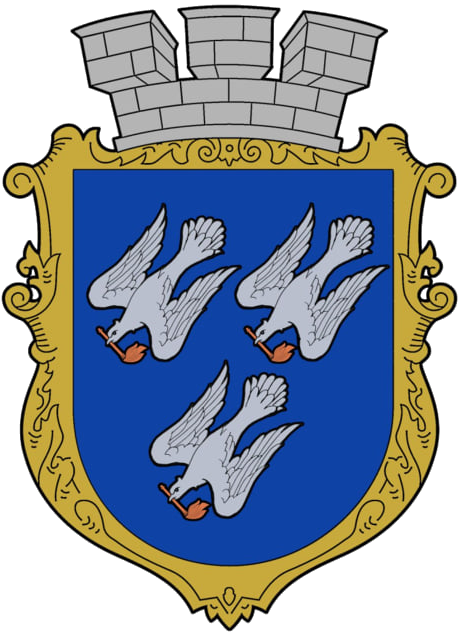
- Flag Coat of arms

- Location of Radomyshl within Zhytomyr Oblast Location of Radomyshl within Ukraine
- Coordinates: 50°29′41″N 29°14′00″E
- Country: Ukraine
- Oblast: Zhytomyr Oblast
- Raion: Zhytomyr Raion
- Hromada: Radomyshl urban hromada
- First mentioned: 1150

Area
  - Total: 6.5 km^{2} (2.5 sq mi)

Population (2022)
  - Total: 13,685
  - Density: 2,100/km^{2} (5,500/sq mi)
- Time zone: UTC+2 (EET)
  - Summer (DST): UTC+3 (EEST)

Radomyshl (Ukrainian: Радомишль, IPA: [ˈradomɪʃlʲ]) is a historic city in Zhytomyr Raion, Zhytomyr Oblast, northern Ukraine. Before 2020, it was the administrative center of the former Radomyshl Raion. It is located on the left bank of the Teteriv River, a right tributary of the Dnieper. Its population is approximately 13,685 (2022 estimate). It is located within the historic region of Right-bank Ukraine.

== Name ==
In addition to the Ukrainian Радомишль (Radomyshl), in other languages the name of the city is Polish: Radomyśl and ראַדאָמישל in Yiddish.

== History ==
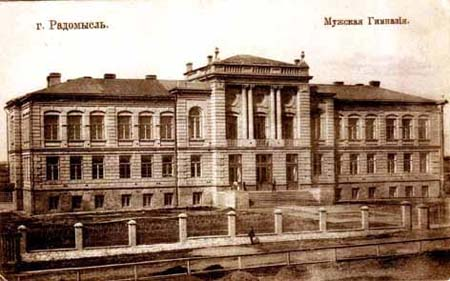
Gymnasium in Radomysl in the early 20th century

Since 1150, it has been known as Mychesk. The settlement probably was destroyed during the Mongol invasion in 1240, after which the region fell under Mongol suzerainty. In the 14th century, it became part of Lithuania and subsequently the Polish–Lithuanian union after the Union of Krewo (1385). The town was raided by Tatars in 1399, 1416 and 1462. As part of the Kingdom of Poland from 1569 it was known under the name of Radomyśl. Administratively it was part of the Kyiv Voivodeship in the Lesser Poland Province of the Polish Crown. At the beginning of the 17th century, the Radomysl paper mill was founded as the first paper mill in present-day central Ukraine. After the Second Partition of Poland in 1793, the town was annexed by the Russian Empire and renamed to its current name. It was included in the Kyiv Governorate.

Radomyshl was historically a center of Jewish settlement. In the year 1797 a total of 1,424 people or 80% of the total population were Jewish. In 1847 it had increased to 2,734 and it further increased to 7,502 (67%) in 1897. In 1910 Radomyshl had a Talmud Torah and five Jewish schools. In 1919 during the Russian Civil War a pogrom by militants under ataman Sokolovsky struck the community. Many were massacred and others fled. In 1926 a fire in the town damaged Radomyshl Synagogue. It was finally demolished in the 1930s. By 1926 the Jewish population had declined to 4,637 (36% of the total population). In 1939, 2,348 Jews lived in the town, representing 20% of the population.

=== World War II ===
During World War II, Radomyshl was occupied by the German Army from 9 July 1941 to 10 November 1943 then again from 7 to 26 December 1943. In August 1941, the Germans established an open ghetto for the Jews. On 5 and 6 August 1941, 276 Jews were killed in two mass executions. On 6 September 1941, Sonderkommando 4a in collaboration with Ukrainian Auxiliary Police shot 1,107 adults and 561 children in the forest during the ghetto liquidation Aktion. Six mass graves have been discovered in the area. Only 250 Jews remained by 1970.

== Population ==
According to the 2001 census, Ukrainians accounted for 94.16% of the population, and Russians for 4.55%.

=== Language ===
Distribution of the population by native language according to the 2001 census:

Language	Percentage
Ukrainian	95.71%
Russian	4.16%
other/undecided	0.13%

== Sights ==
Nowadays Radomyshl is known primarily for the Museum of Ukrainian home icons located in Radomysl Castle, a private museum founded by Olha Bohomolets. Another landmark of the town is the St. Nicholas Cathedral, built in the 19th century.

== Gallery ==
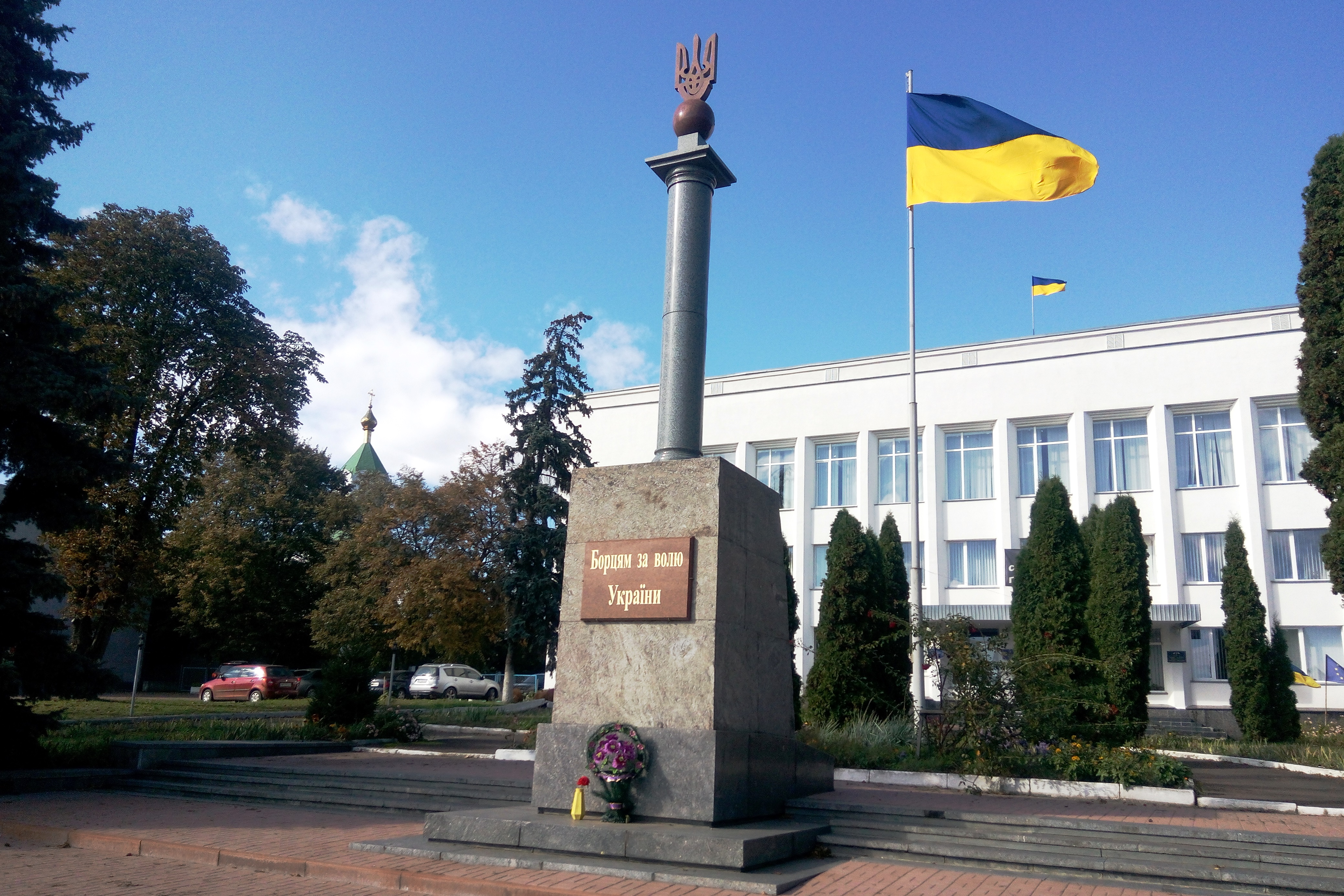
War memorial

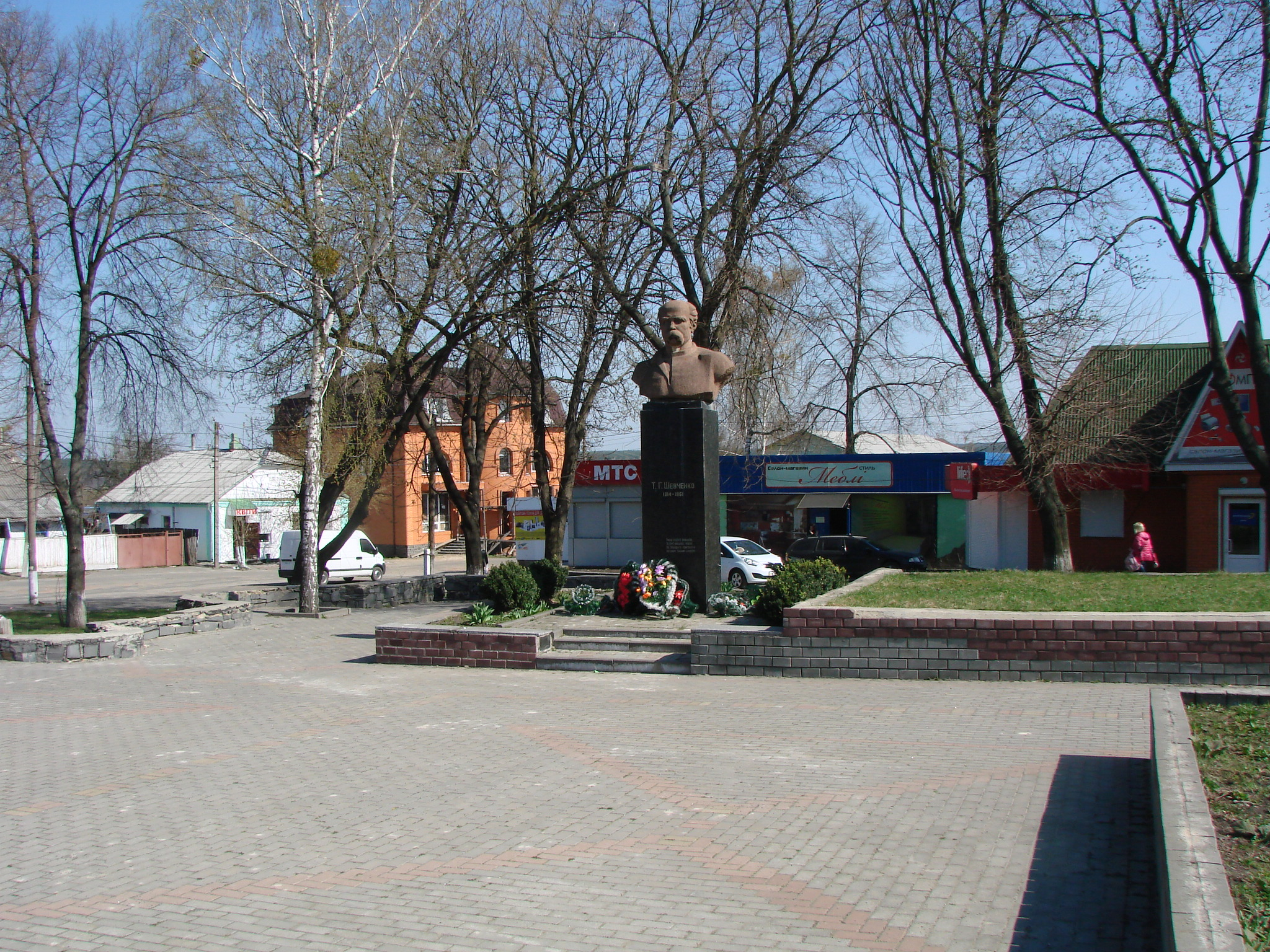
Taras Shevchenko monument in Radomyshl

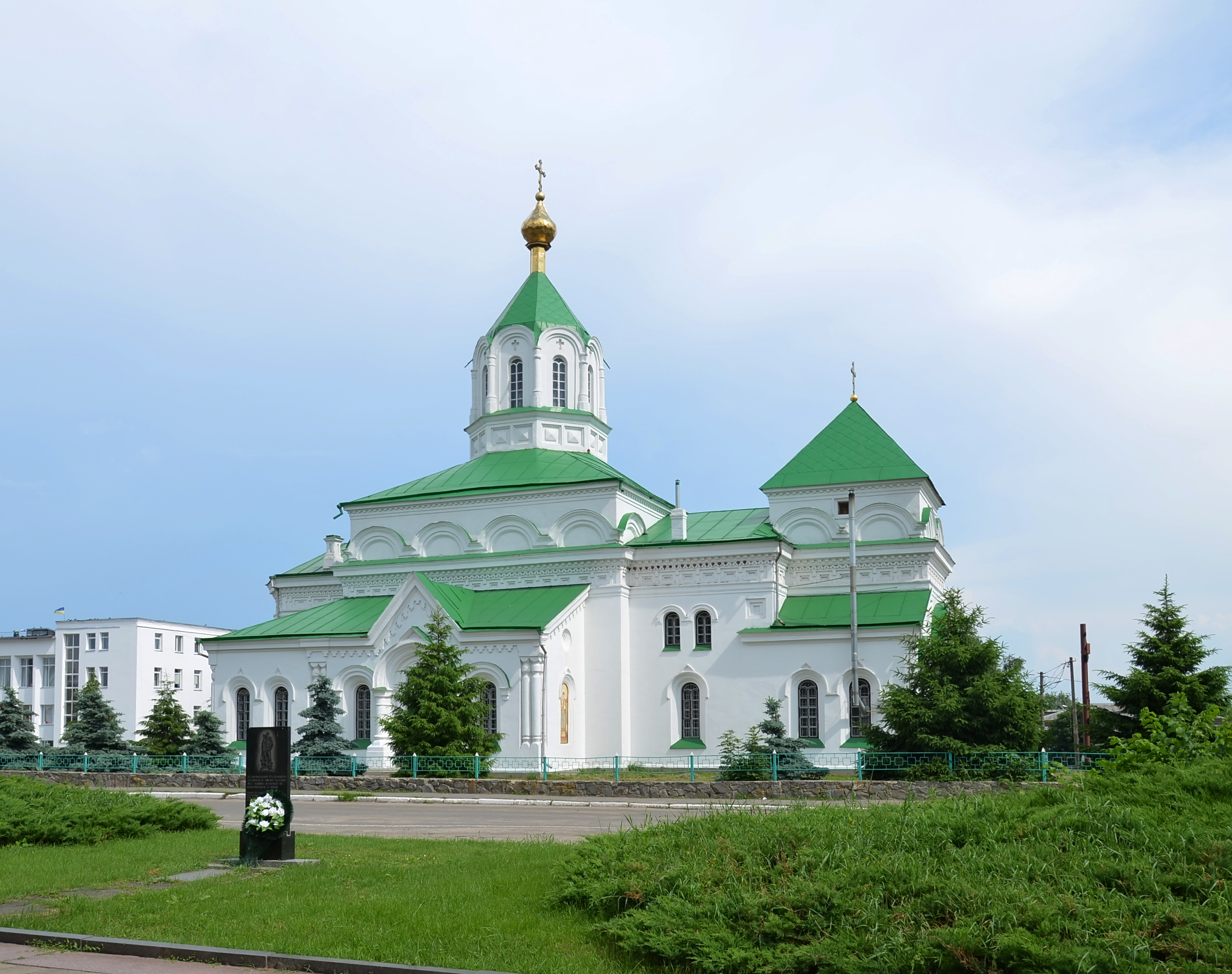
St. Nicholas Cathedral

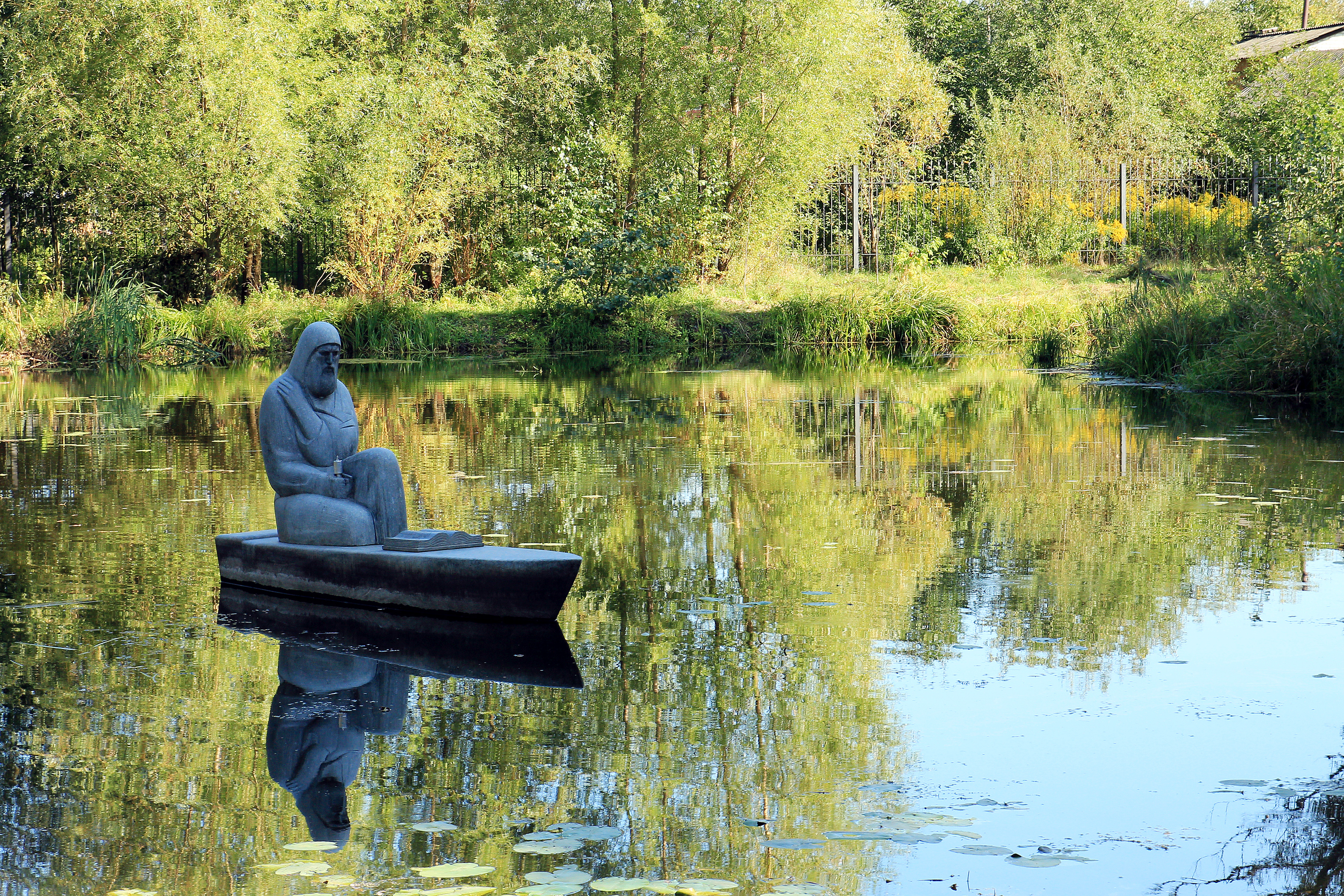
Archimandrite Yelysei Pletenetskyi monument

== Notable people ==
- Yelysei Pletenetskyi (c. 1550–1624), Eastern Orthodox clergyman, founder of Radomysl paper mill
- Dora Shulner (1890–1964), Yiddish writer
- Marusya Sokolovska (1902–c. 1919), Ukrainian insurgent leader
- Oleksandr Zinchenko (born 1996), footballer for Arsenal F.C.
