= Dora Shulner =

Ukrainian-born Jewish-American Yiddish author (1890–1964)

Dora Shulner née Feldman (July 24, 1890 – May 12, 1964) was a Ukrainian-born Jewish-American Yiddish author.

== Life ==
Shulner was born on July 24, 1890, in Radomyshl, Kiev Governorate, Russian Empire, the son of Motl Feldman. Her father was a teacher and maskil who died young. Her mother was the daughter of a baker who supported the family after Motl's death by baking and selling honey cakes. Shulner began apprenticing with tailors and a sock maker when she was ten, and when she was fourteen she began working at a textile factory and became active in the Bund.

In 1907, Shulner married Henry Shulner. Their children were Helen, Max, Harry, and Belle. Henry was a religious tailor she had little in common with who worked in Kyiv but returned to Radomyshl from time to time. Dora remained active in the Bund during this time. In 1914, Henry immigrated to America to join his parents and siblings in Chicago, Illinois. World War I broke out shortly afterwards. Dora was then left to raise the children on her own, running a modern maternity house in Radomyshl in the midst of the war, revolutions, pogroms, and the early years of the Soviet Union. She and the children were only able to join Henry in Chicago in 1922.

An activist in Chicago's Yiddish cultural life, Shulner sought to establish Yiddish schools and organize reading and study groups. Her stories were first published in New York's Frayhayt (Freedom) in 1940. She then wrote stories in Chicago's Idishe Kuryer (Jewish Courier), Unzer Veg (Our Way), and Kalifornye Idishe Shtime (Jewish Voice of California), as well as periodicals in Toronto, Winnipeg, Mexico City, and elsewhere. Her works depicted the lives of Jewish women in America and the Pale of Settlement.

While Shulner largely wrote fiction, her work was based on her own life. Her first book, Azoy Hot Es Pasirt (This is How it Happened), was about her experiences during World War I and the Russian Revolution prior to immigrating to America. It was published in 1942 and won an award from YIVO. Her second book, Miltshin, was an anthology published in 1946 that included further autobiographical details about immigrating to America. In 1949, she wrote the novel Esther, which was based on her life. She didn't publish as much afterwards until 1956, when she published another anthology called Geshtaltn. When her husband Henry died a year later, she moved from Chicago to Los Angeles, California, where three of her children were living. She published her last book, Perzenlikhkaytn in Yidishn Lebn (Personalities in Yiddish Life), there in 1963. It was a collection of essays and character sketches of writers and friends.

Shulner died in Los Angeles on May 12, 1964. The first chapter of Esther was included in Found Treasures, a 1996 anthology of translated Yiddish women writers, introducing her work to a new generation of readers.
