= Radomyshl Synagogue =

Former synagogue in Radomyshl, Ukraine

- An etching of the former synagogue in c. 1900

- Location of the former synagogue in Ukraine

Religion
- Affiliation: Judaism (former)
- Ecclesiastical or organizational status: Synagogue (1887–1926)
- Status: Destroyed

Location
- Location: Radomyshl, Zhytomyr Oblast
- Country: Ukraine
- Interactive map of Radomyshl Synagogue
- Coordinates: 50°29′35″N 29°15′29″E

Architecture
- Architect: Fedorov
- Type: Synagogue architecture
- Established: 1879 (as a congregation)
- Completed: 1887
- Demolished: 1926 (damaged by fire); 1930s (demolished)
- Materials: Stone and masonry

The Radomyshl Synagogue is a former Jewish synagogue that was located in the town of Radomyshl, Zhytomyr Oblast in Ukraine. It was built in 1887. A great fire in the town in 1926 damaged the building. It was demolished in the 1930s.

== History ==
Jews lived in Radomysl since the 16th century. After a national liberation war, the Radomyshl kagal was completely devastated and almost disappeared. The second wave of Jewish settlement started in the 18th century. At that time Jews made up the majority of the population of Radomysl. In 1845, there were seven synagogues in Radomyshl.

== See also ==
- List of synagogues in Ukraine
- History of the Jews in Ukraine
