= Hustyn Chronicle =

17th-century chronicle

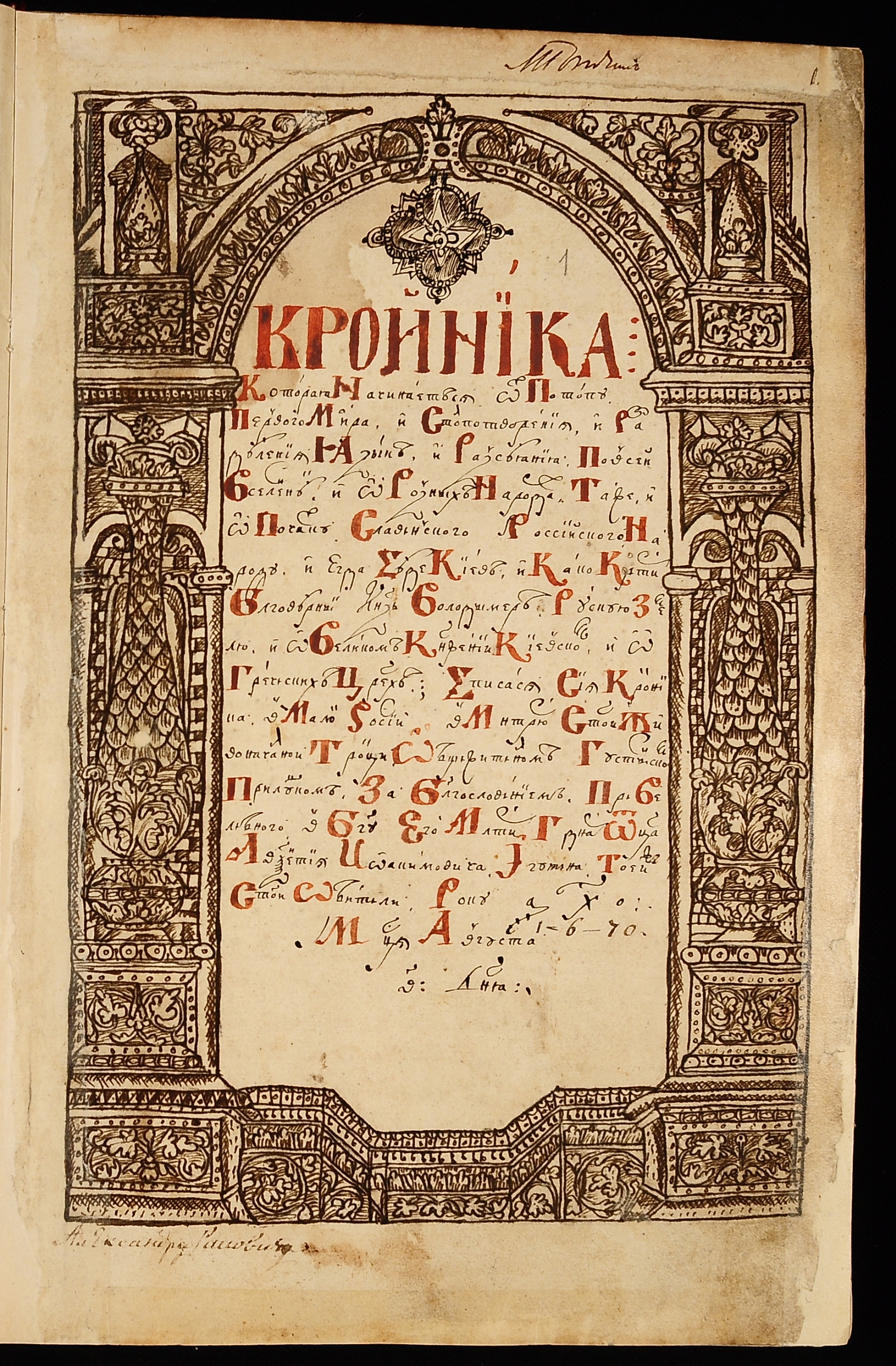
- Language: Church Slavonic
- Subject: Slavic history

The Hustyn Chronicle (Ukrainian: Густинський літопис, romanized: Hustynsjkyj litopys) is a 17th-century chronicle detailing the history of Ukraine until 1598. It was written in Church Slavonic. Drawing on earlier sources, the Chronicle covers Ukraine's relationship with the Principality of Moscow and the Grand Duchy of Lithuania, the impact of the Turks and Tatars, and the origin of the Cossacks. It ends with the introduction of the Gregorian calendar (1582), and the Union of Brest (1596).

== Textual witnesses ==
The original chronicle has not survived, but three copies of it have been preserved:

- The Hustyn Copy, copied in 1670 by Hieromonach Mykhailo Losyts'kyi, who called it the "Ruthenian Chronicle" us preserved in the Russian State Library, manuscripts department, f. 205, no. 118. 238 pages.
- The Mhar Monastery copy
- The Archival copy

== Contents ==
The Hustyn Chronicle begins with a few references to Bible stories, including the Genesis flood narrative and the Tower of Babel; thereafter, the legendary founding of Kyiv by Kyi, Shchek and Khoryv, and Lybid' is narrated. This is followed by the history of Kievan Rus' by the reigns of princes, with special attention to Volyn' and Podolia. After that, it becomes a history of the Ukrainian people and their relations with neighbouring peoples, such as the Belarusians within the Grand Duchy of Lithuania, the Crimean Khanate and the Ottoman Empire, until the emergence of the Cossacks. The last date mentioned is 1597.

== Composition ==
Fulltext 1670 copy of the Hustyn Chronicle (click for full PDF).

The contents of the Hustyn Chronicle are largely an abridged copy of the Hypatian Codex, but the last 25 pages are an independent continuation from 1300 to 1597.

The other sources of information have been identified as:

- Caesar Baronius (1538–1607), Italian church historian and Catholic cardinal;
- An Abridged Course of History (Epitome Historiarum) by Byzantine historian John Zonaras (12th century);
- Polish historian Marcin Kromer (1512–1589);
- Veronese historian Alexander Guagnini (1538–1614);
- a Chronicle of the Grand Duchy of Lithuania, probably the Bychowiec Chronicle (16th century);
- the Kyiv Caves Patericon of the Kyiv Pechersk Lavra (13th century);
- the Prologue (12th century);
- the Palinodiia of Zacharias Kopystensky (1621/3).
- material from an unknown source, hypothesised by some scholars such as M. Vozniak (1924) and E.M. Apanovich (1983) to be a now-lost, anonymous Ukrainian Authentic Chronicle (Ukrainian: Український вірогідний літопис, romanized: Ukrains'kyi virohidnyi litopys) or Ukrainian Chronicle (Russian: Украинская летопись, romanized: Ukrainskaia letopis') covering the years 1512 to 1648.

Given the inclusion of material from the Palinodiia, the Hustyn Chronicle could not have been compiled before 1623. Soviet historian Anatoliy Yershov (1930) concluded that Zacharias Kopystensky (died 1627), the author of the Palinodiia, had probably also written the Hustyn Chronicle. But American historian George Perfecky (1991) disagreed, because the Palinodiia and the Hustyn Chronicle present very different accounts of the Christianization of Kievan Rus', and therefore were probably not written by the same author. Instead, Perfecky built upon previous research which suggested that a now-lost, anonymous Ukrainian (Authentic) Chronicle covering the years 1512 to 1648 had existed as one of the unaccounted sources; therefore, the Hustyn Chronicle must have been written after 1648, but before it was copied by Losyts'kyi in 1670.

- Primary Chronicle (PVL)
- Southern PVL continuation 1110–1116
- Kievan Chronicle
- Galician–Volhynian Chronicle
- Hustyn Chronicle continuation

== Bibliography ==
- Luznycky, Gregory (1961). Ukrainian Literature Within the Framework of World Literature: A Short Outline of Ukrainian Literature from Renaissance to Romanticism (PDF). Philadelphia: "America" Publishing House. p. 77.
- Perfecky, George A. (1991). "The Christianization of Rus' in the Hustyn Chronicle". Canadian-American Slavic Studies. 25 (1–4). Brill: 159–177. doi:10.1163/221023991X00119.
- Tolochko, Oleksiy (1996). "Де було написано Густинський літопис?" [Where was the Hustyn Chronicle written?]. Історичний збірник: Історія. Історіософія. Джерелознавство [Historical Collection: History. Historiosophy. Source Studies.] (in Ukrainian). Kyiv: Intel. pp. 4–20. ISBN 5-7702-1282-9.
