= Novgorod-Seversky Viceroyalty =

1781-1796 unit of Russia

Novgorod-Seversky Viceroyalty Новгород-Северское наместничество (Russian)
- Viceroyalty of the Russian Empire
- 1781–1796
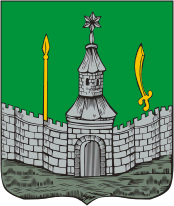
- Coat of arms

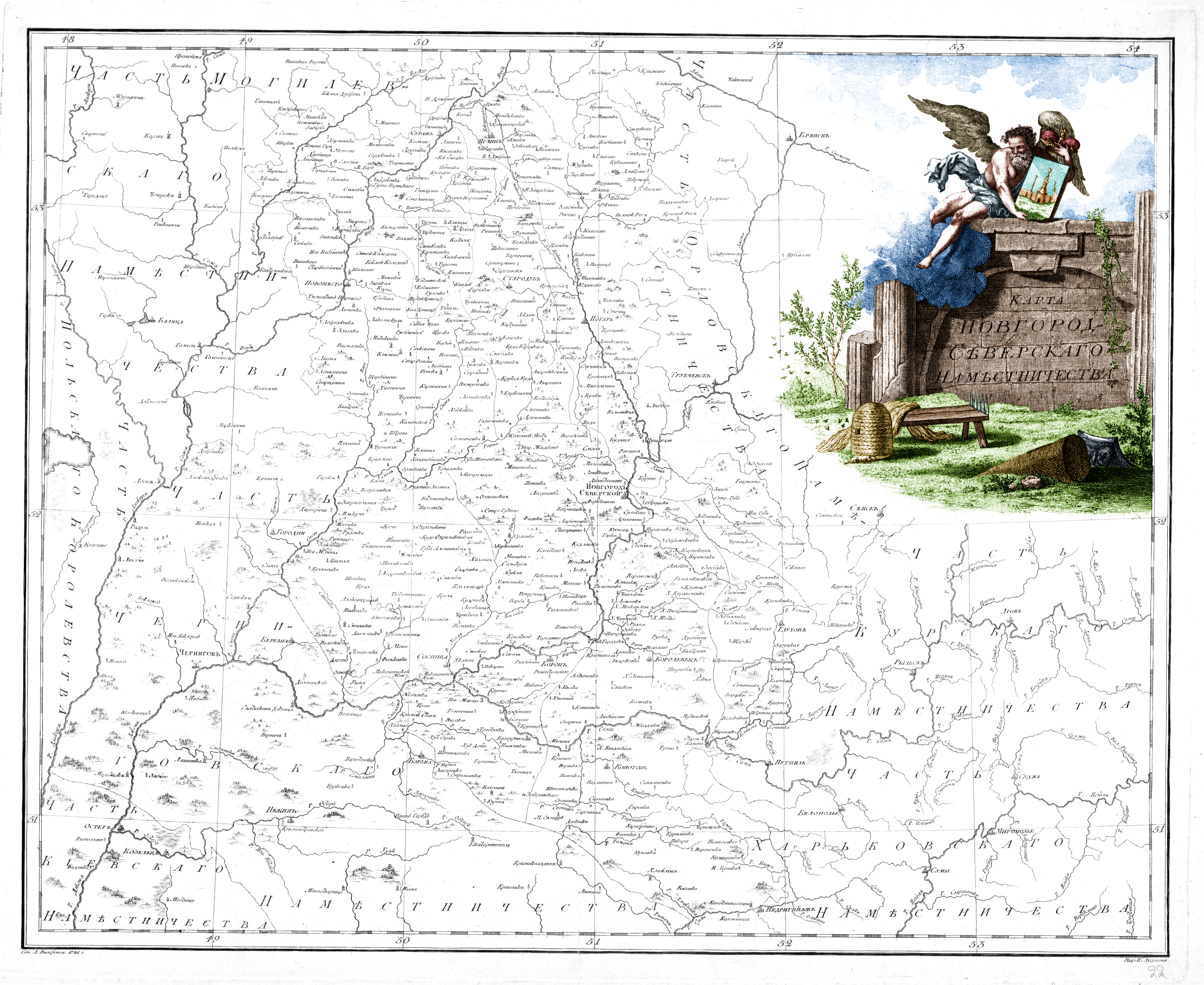
- Capital: Novgorod-Seversky
- History
  - Established: 16 September 1781
  - Disestablished: 12 December 1796
Preceded by	Succeeded by
Little Russia Governorate (1764–1781)	Little Russia Governorate (1796–1802)

Novgorod-Seversky Viceroyalty, (Note: Russian: Новгород-Северское наместничество, romanized: Novgorod-Severskoye namestnichestvo) sometimes Novgorod-Seversky Governorate, (Note: Russian: Новгород-Северская губерния, romanized: Novgorod-Severskaya guberniya) was an administrative-territorial unit (namestnichestvo) of the Russian Empire, which existed in 1781–1796. Its capital was in Novgorod-Seversky.

== History ==
On September 16, 1781, Catherine II issued a decree “On the establishment of the Novgorod-Seversky Viceroyalty”.

It was formed from the territory of the Starodubsky and partly the Nezhin and Chernigov Regiments.

To this day, the following description of the coat of arms of the Novgorod-Seversky Viceroyalty has been preserved: “In a green field is part of the city wall with a gate, above which there is a tower with a star, and on the sides there is a spear and a golden saber”.

In 1796, the Viceroyalty was abolished, its territory was included in Little Russian Governorate, and with its abolition (1802) – in Chernigov Governorate.
