= Radomysl uezd =

Radomysl uezd Радомысльский уезд
- Uezd
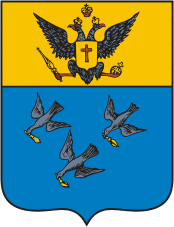
- Coat of arms

- Location in the Kiev Governorate
- Country: Russian Empire
- Krai: Southwestern
- Governorate: Kiev
- Established: 1797
- Abolished: 1923
- Capital: Radomysl

Area
  - Total: 8,468 km^{2} (3,270 sq mi)

Population (1897)
  - Total: 315,629
  - Density: 37.27/km^{2} (96.54/sq mi)

The Radomysl uezd (Russian: Радомысльский уезд; Ukrainian: Радомисльський повіт, romanized: Radomysl's'kyi povit) was one of the subdivisions of the Kiev Governorate of the Russian Empire. It was situated in the northern part of the governorate. Its administrative centre was Radomyshl. It included the city of Chernobyl which later became the seat of its own Raion after the uyezd was liquidated in 1923, but before that was the seat of Chernobyl uezd which existed from 1919 to 1923.

== Demographics ==
At the time of the Russian Empire Census of 1897, Radomyslsky Uyezd had a population of 315,629. Of these, 78.4% spoke Ukrainian, 13.1% Yiddish, 3.9% Russian, 2.3% German, 1.9% Polish and 0.4% Czech as their native language.
