= Radomysl Castle =

Castle in Radomyshl, Ukraine

- Замок Радомисль
- Radomyshl in Ukraine
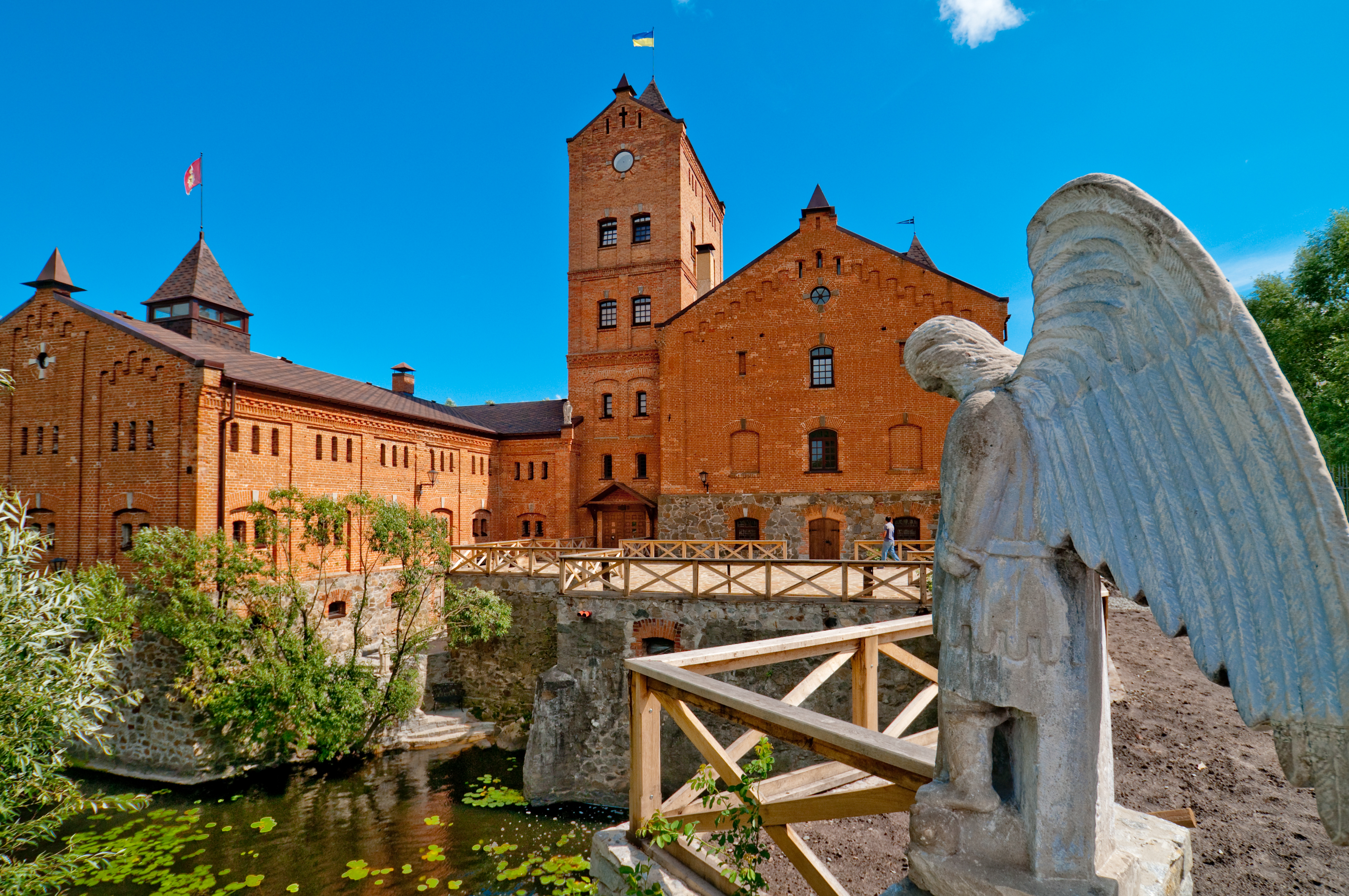

Site information
- Type: Castle
- Owner: Olha Bohomolets

Location
- Location within Zhytomyr Oblast Location within Ukraine
- Coordinates: 50°28′40″N 29°13′00″E

Site history
- Built: 2007–2011

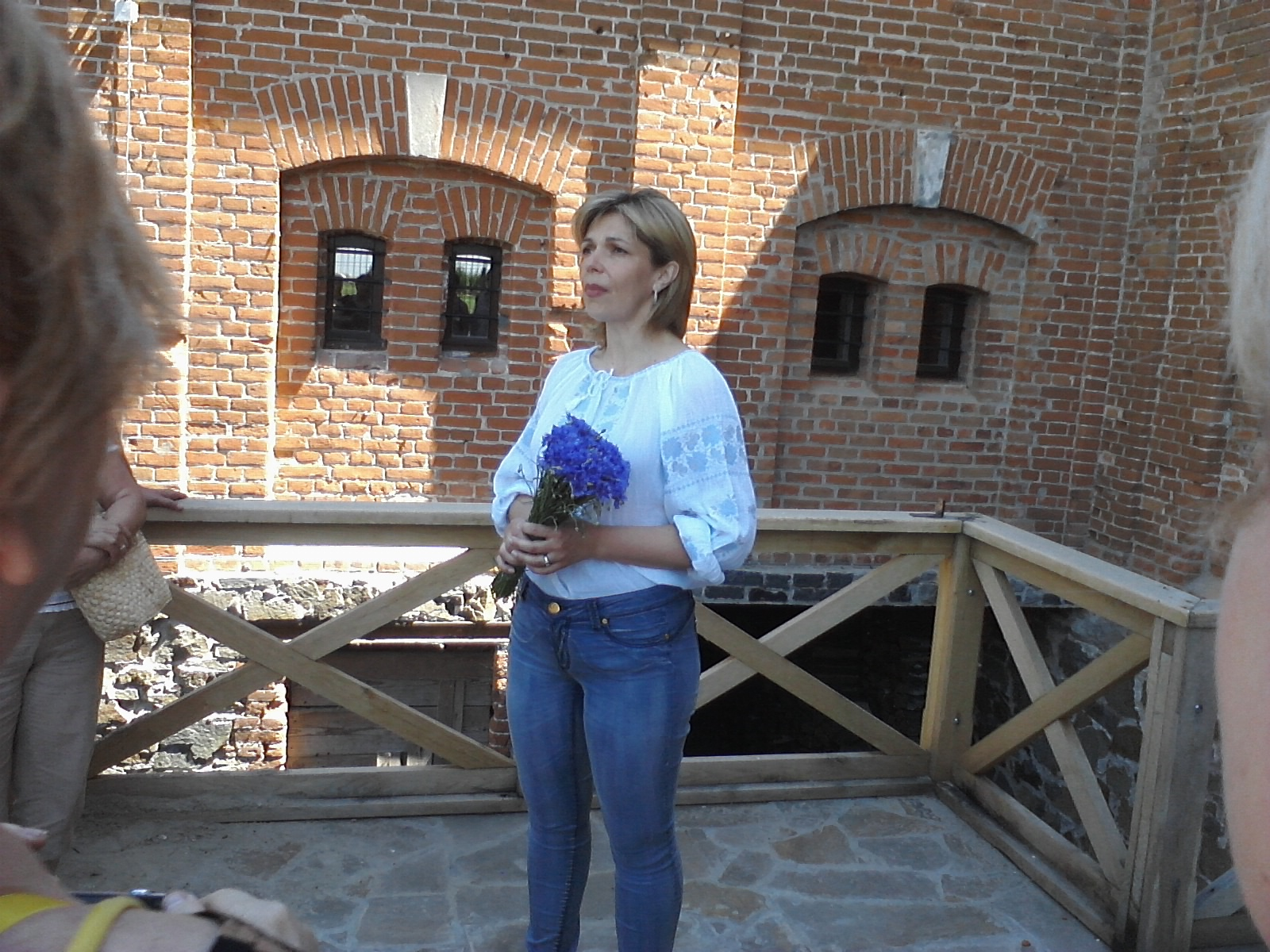
Olha Bohomolets, the Radomysl Castle's owner

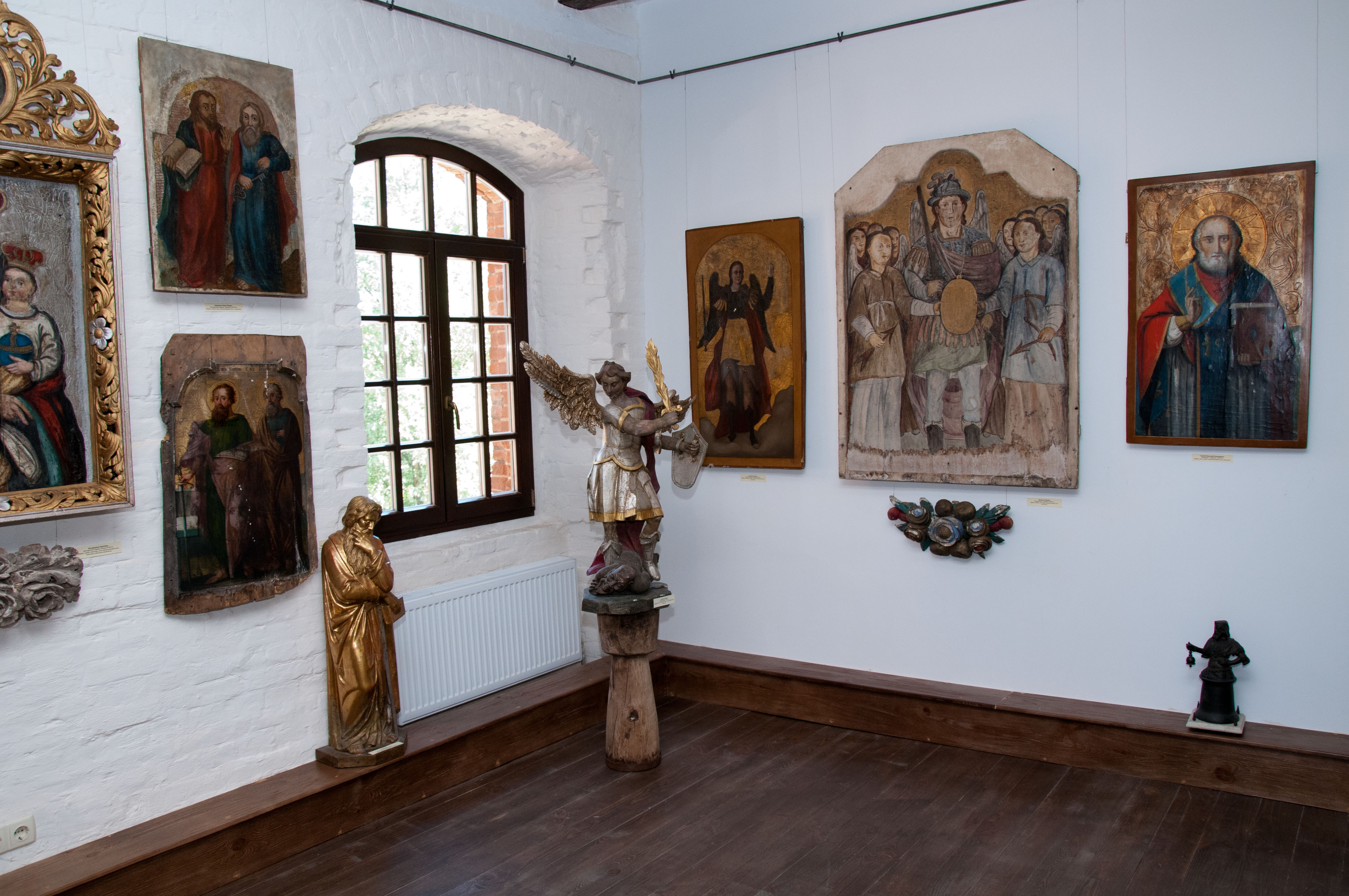
Radomysl Castle. The Museum of Ukrainian Home Icons. The Ceremonial Hall's piece of exhibition.

Radomysl Castle (Ukrainian: Замок Радомисль) is a historical and cultural complex created in 2007–2011 by Olha Bohomolets, a Ukrainian doctor and public activist. The castle's center is an old flour mill built in the town of Radomyshl (Zhytomyr Oblast, Ukraine) in the late 19th century by Polish engineer Piekarski. The mill was constructed upon the ruins of a paper mill built in 1612 by the order of the archimandrite (abbot) of Kyiv-Pechersk Lavra Yelysei Pletenetskyi (1550–1624). During research conducted during the reconstruction of this building, it was discovered that it had been planned to be used as a fortress. Since 2011, Radomysl Castle has been part of the Council of Europe's cultural project, Via Regia. Its purpose is to promote cultural exchanges by means of tourism between European countries.

== Interior ==
The main attraction of Radomysl Castle is the Museum of Ukrainian home icons. The Museum's collection is based upon Olha Bohomolets' private collection of icons, which she has been collecting since 1996. This is perhaps the first and only museum of its kind in Ukraine and in the entire world (despite museum on Supraśl and Sanok, Poland). The collection comprises more than 5000 icons and sculptures (Orthodox, Catholic, and Greek-Catholic), created between the 16th and 20th centuries in different parts of Ukraine. One of the museum's highlights is an icon of St. Nicholas carved in stone. This is probably the oldest icon in the collection of Radomysl Castle, dated from the 12th century. Some icons retain traces of the Soviet aggressive atheism. Among the exhibits is a box made of headless icons. Some of the icons were rescued from burning, but they are impossible to restore.

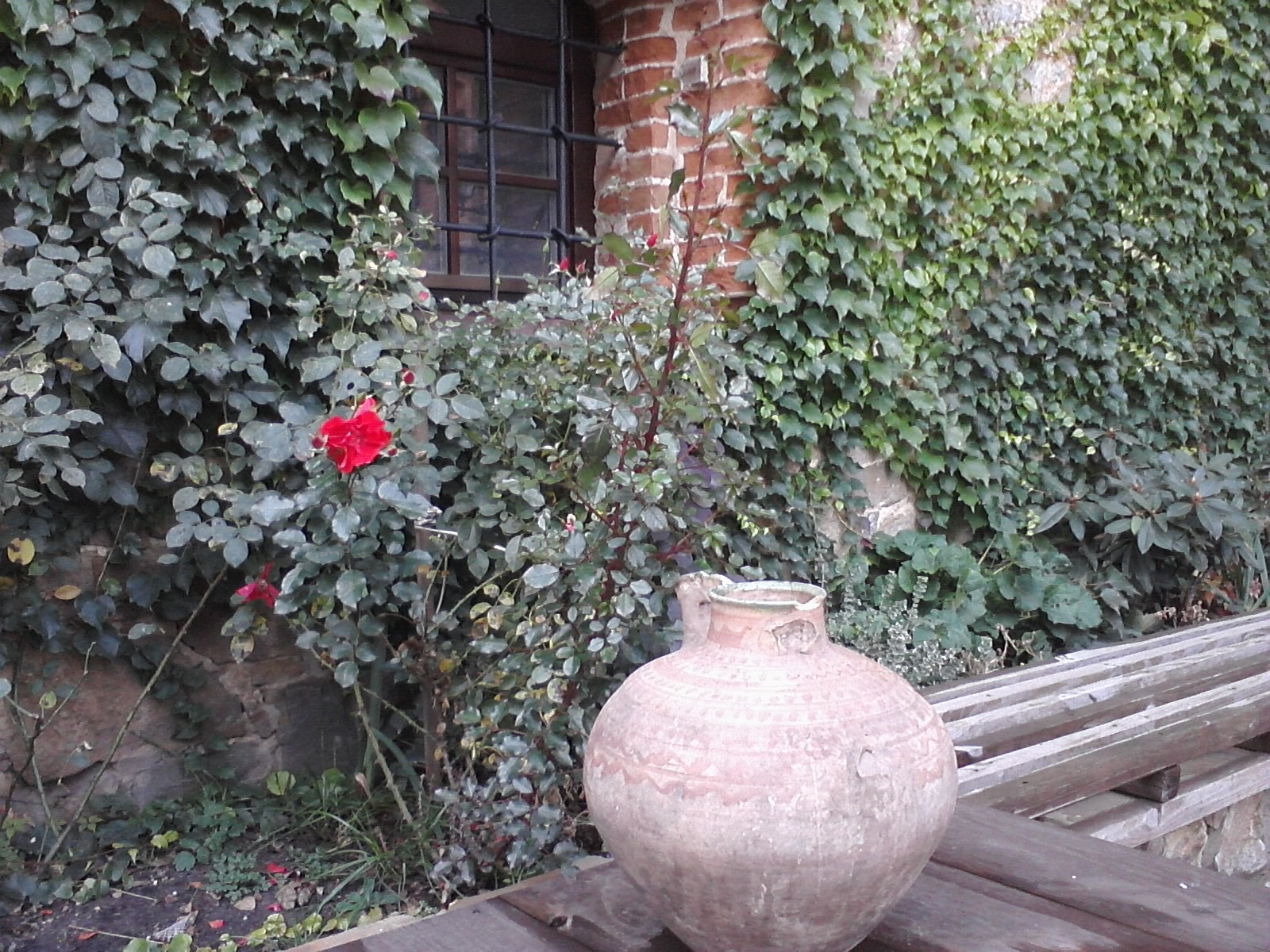
Near the entrance to the castle

The Castle's interior combines the features of the Late Medieval and Early Modern periods. One of the halls in the museum exhibition is the Ceremonial Hall. It is a place for special events, especially weddings. There is also a concert hall which seats 150 for classical music, chamber music, folk and jazz. Nina Matviyenko, a popular Ukrainian folk singer, performed there. The Castle Radomysl's concert hall has another unique feature, it is probably the only concert hall in Europe with its own natural water spring.

The Castle's refectory is also a small museum. On its walls hang fine copies of old maps from the 15th–19th centuries. Its big oven can be used both to cook food, and as a fireplace.

== Landscape park ==
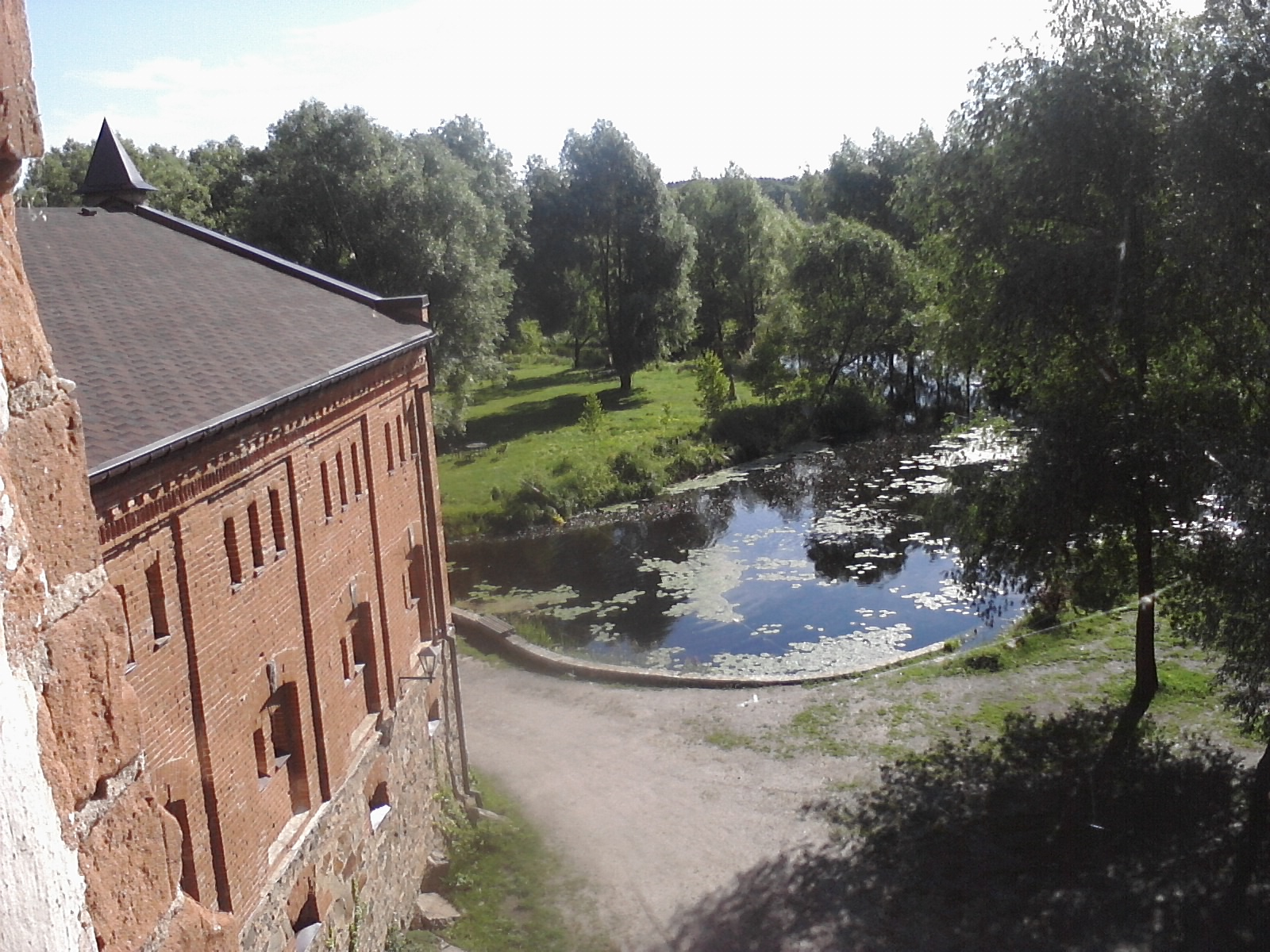
Radomysl Castle. The view from the window towards the castle's landscape park.

Radomysl Castle's landscape park was created in accordance with modern environmental requirements. Human interference in the environment was minimal. There are some natural fresh water springs in the park, which provide a very refreshing drink. The vast majority of trees and flowers growing in the park are rare species. Among them are iris, pink and white lilies, English garden roses, magnolias, and Trapa rossica, a water caltrop, which is listed in Ukraine's Red Book of endangered species.

The park is inhabited by animals like beavers, otters, minks, and water voles.

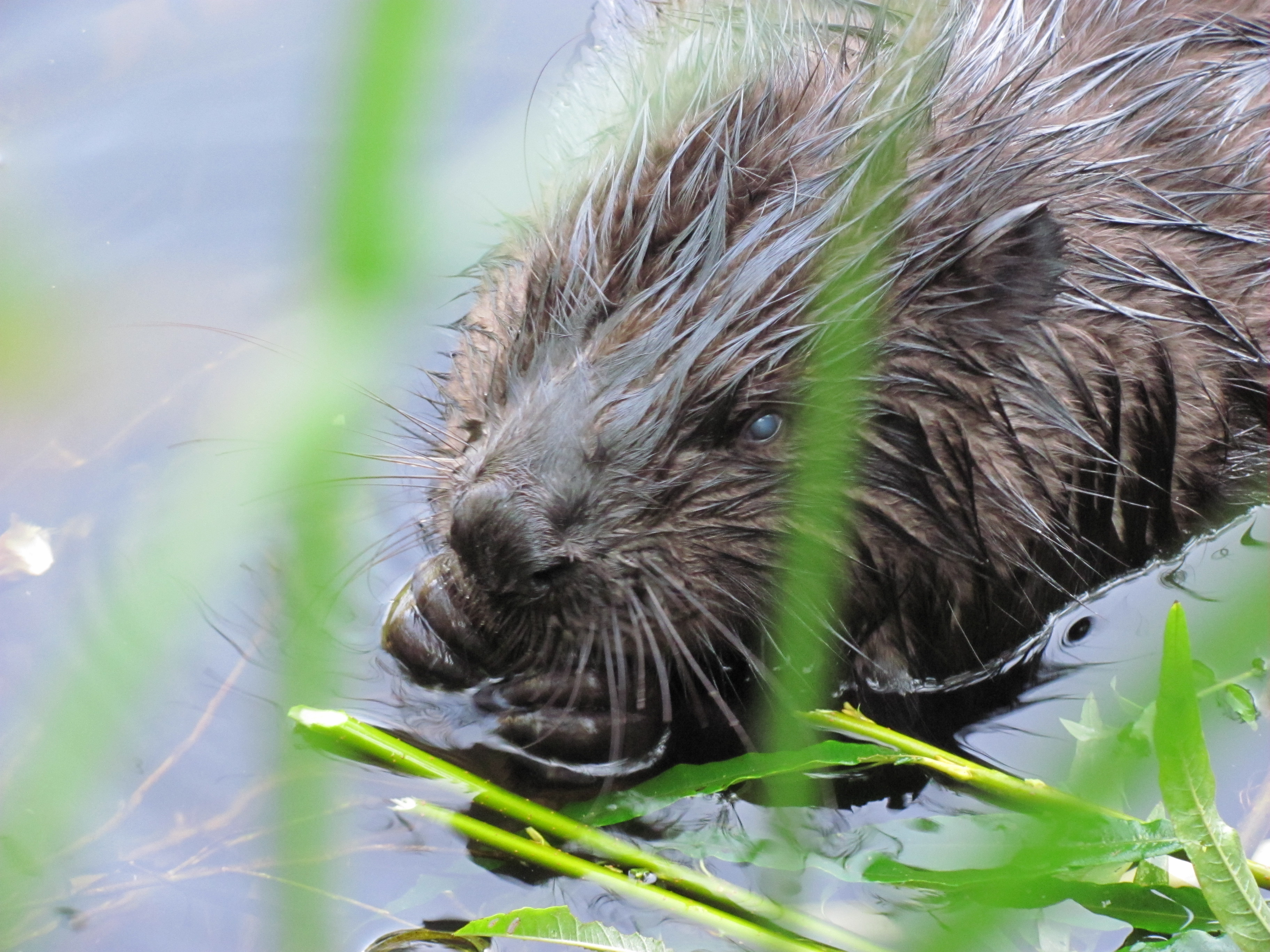
Beavers are typical inhabitants of the Castle's landscape park.

The Castle and its park are decorated with sculptures of St. Michael, dated to the 17th–19th centuries.

On 29 October 2009, near the place where the paper mill stood, a monument to Yelysei Pletenetskyi was unveiled. This is perhaps the only monument in Ukraine on the surface of moving water.

== Sources ==
- Budka W. Papiernictwo w Nowym Stawie і Radomyślu // Pzegląd Biblioteczny. – Rocz. 3. – Kraków, 1929.
- Енциклопедія українознавства. У 10-х т. / Гол. ред. Володимир Кубійович. – Париж; Нью-Йорк: Молоде Життя, 1954–1989.
- Гладиш Л.А. Радомишль: ключі від міста. Нариси про історію міста. – Житомир, «Полісся», 2007
- Запаско Я., Мацюк О. Стасенко В. Початки українського друкарства – Львів, 2000.
- Мацюк О. Історія українського паперу. – Київ, 1994.
- Тимошенко Л. «Радомисль в історії Української церкви»// Людина і світ. – 1997. – No.2. – С. 6–11.
- "Замок Радомисль" відзначає п'ятиріччя з дня початку реконструкції.
- Реконструйований "Замок Радомисль" на Житомирщині може стати візиткою регіону
