= Little Russia Governorate =

Little Russia Governorate may refer to:

== 1764–1781 ==
Little Russia Governorate Малороссийская губерния (Russian)
- Governorate of the Russian Empire
- 1764–1781
- Coat of arms

- Capital: Hlukhiv (1764–1773); Kozelets (1773–1775); Kiev (1775–1781)
- Government
- Governor
  - 1764–1781: Pyotr Rumyantsev
- Legislature: Little Russian Collegium
- History
  - Established: 12 December 1764
  - Disestablished: 27 February 1781
- Political subdivisions: regiments (polks)
Preceded by	Succeeded by
Cossack Hetmanate	Kiev Viceroyalty; Novgorod-Seversky Viceroyalty
- Today part of: Chernihiv Oblast, Bryansk Oblast, Kyiv Oblast, Poltava Oblast, Cherkasy Oblast, Sumy Oblast, Kharkiv Oblast

The First Little Russia Governorate (Note: Russian: Малороссийская губерния, pre-1918: Малороссiйская губернiя, romanized: Malorossiyskaya guberniya; Ukrainian: Малоросійська губернія) or Malorossiya Governorate, was an administrative-territorial unit (guberniya) of the Russian Empire, which existed in 1764–1781. It was created after the abolition of Cossack Hetmanate and was governed by Pyotr Rumyantsev.

With another administrative reform of 1781 the governorate and its subdivisions (regiments) were liquidated and replaced with vice-royalties divided into counties (uezds).

=== Subdivisions ===
The governorate was divided into 10 regiments (polk) which were equivalent to counties (uezd).

- Starodub Regiment (1663–1782)
- Kyiv Regiment
- Pereiaslav Regiment
- Nizhyn Regiment
- Chernihiv Regiment
- Pryluky Regiment
- Lubny Regiment
- Myrhorod Regiment
- Hadiach Regiment
- Poltava Regiment

=== Coat of arms ===
Cossack with musket, official coat of arms of the Cossack Hetmanate

Until 1767 the coat of arms for the governorate was Cossack with musket when it was replaced with the Russian double headed eagle.

== 1796–1802 ==
Little Russia Governorate Малороссийская губерния (Russian)
- Governorate of the Russian Empire
- 1796–1802
- Coat of arms

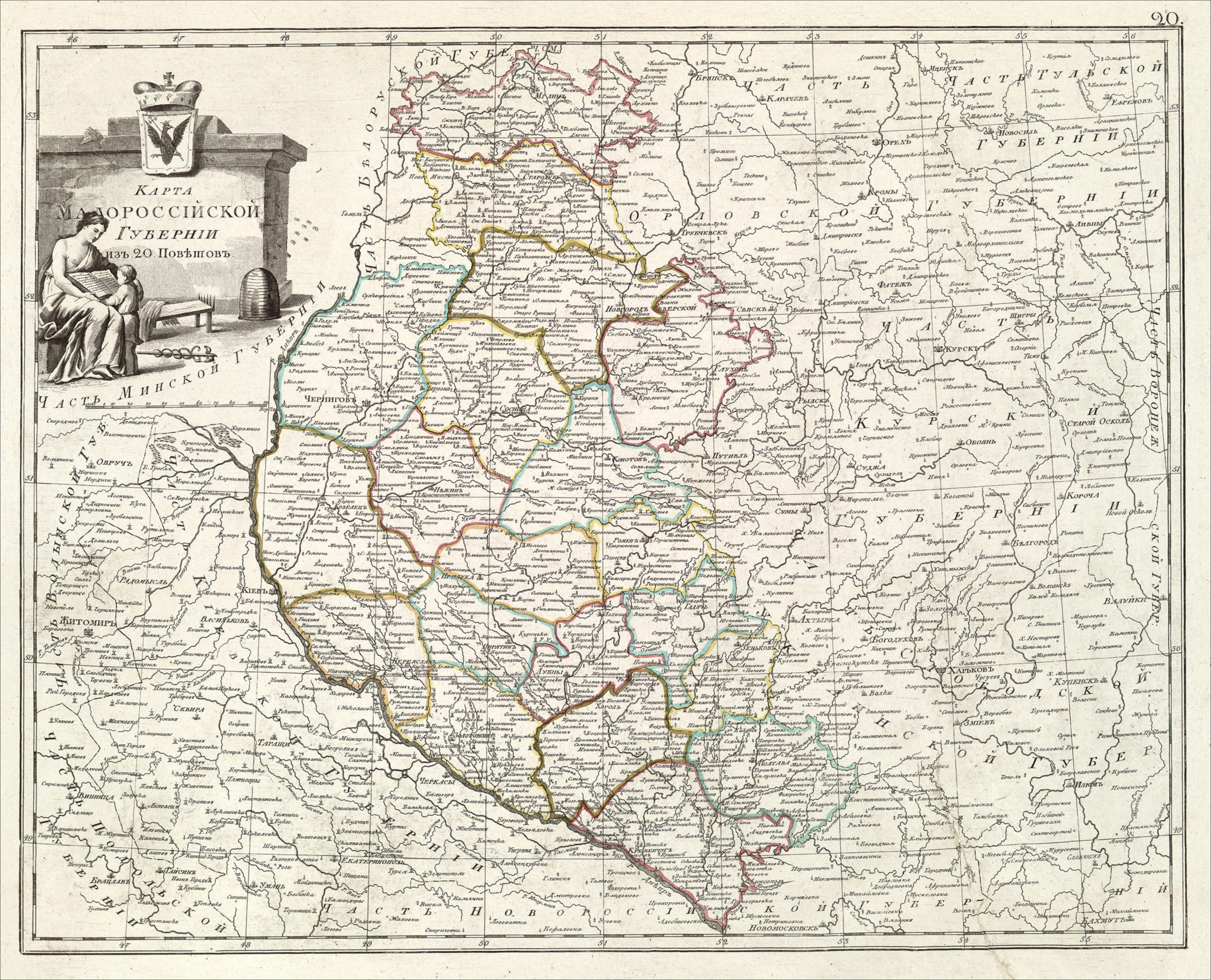
- Capital: Chernigov
- History
  - Established: 12 December 1796
  - Disestablished: 27 February 1802
Preceded by
Kiev Viceroyalty
Novgorod-Seversky Viceroyalty
Chernigov Viceroyalty
Succeeded by
Chernigov Governorate
Poltava Governorate
- Today part of: Ukraine

Little Russia Governorate (Note: Russian: Малороссийская губерния, pre-1918: Малороссiйская Губернiя, romanized: Malorossiyskaya guberniya) or Malorossiya Governorate was an administrative-territorial unit (guberniya) of the Russian Empire that encompassed most of modern-day northeastern Ukraine, then given the historical designation of Little Russia, and adjacent regions in Russia.

The Governorate was formed in 1796 under the administrative reforms of Paul I which abolished the viceroyalty (namestnichestvo) system, which in turn replaced the regimental administration of the Cossack Hetmanate in 1781. This placed the Kiev Viceroyalty (excluding the city of Kiev itself), Novgorod-Seversky Viceroyalty and Chernigov Viceroyalty under the new unit. The administrative centre was the city of Chernigov (Chernihiv).

However, the extensive area which the new unit covered was too great for effective administration, and in February 1802 the Governorate was split into Chernigov Governorate and Poltava Governorate.

== See also ==
- Little Russia Governorate-General (1802–1856)
