= Zacharias Kopystensky =

Archimandrite (d. 1627)

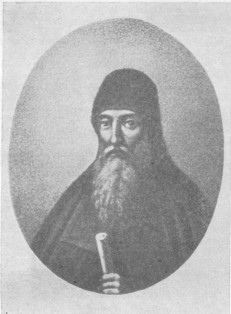
Zacharias Kopystensky

Zacharias Kopystensky (born in Przemyśl, present-day Poland – died 21 March 1627) was archimandrite of the Kyiv Pechersk Lavra in Ukraine. He is best known for his polemic work Palinodiia (1621/3), in which he defended Eastern Orthodoxy against the Ruthenian Uniate Church. He also translated the Horologion and the works of John Chrysostom. He succeeded Yelisey Pletenetsky as archimandrite in 1624.

Kopystensky studied at the Ostroh Academy. During his lifetime, Kyiv was part of the Polish–Lithuanian Commonwealth, and Kopystensky belonged to a circle of Orthodox clerics who promoted ideas of national liberation and cultural self-preservation. The authorship of the Hustyn Chronicle, which traces the history of Ukraine up to 1598, has also been attributed to Kopystensky, but there are also some arguments why it may have been written by someone else.

The Khlebnikov Codex or a closely related copy may have been present or known in the city of Kiev in the early 1620s, because marginalia in chapter four of Palinodia (1621), which may or may not have been added by author Zacharias Kopystensky himself, mentions a "chronicle of Nestor".

== Bibliography ==
- Perfecky, George A. (1991). "The Christianization of Rus' in the Hustyn Chronicle". Canadian-American Slavic Studies. 25 (1–4). Brill: 159–177. doi:10.1163/221023991X00119.
- Tolochko, Oleksiy (2007). "On "Nestor the Chronicler"". Harvard Ukrainian Studies. 29 (1). Harvard University: 31–59. JSTOR 41304501.

Religious titles
Preceded by Yelisey Pletenetsky	Archimandrite of Kyiv Pechersk Lavra; 1624–1627	Succeeded by Petro Mohyla
