= Kiev Viceroyalty =

1781–1796 unit of Russia

Kiev Viceroyalty Киевское наместничество
- Viceroyalty of Russian Empire
- 1781–1796
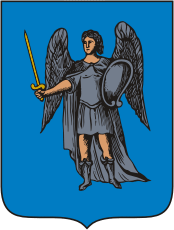
- Coat of arms

- Kiev Viceroyalty map from 1792
- Capital: Kiev
- History
  - Established: 7 November 1781
  - Disestablished: 30 November 1796
- Political subdivisions: uyezds: 11 okrugs: 10 (from 1791)
Preceded by	Succeeded by
Kiev Governorate (1708–1764); Little Russia Governorate (1764–1781)	Kiev Governorate; Little Russia Governorate (1796–1802)

Kiev Viceroyalty (Russian: Киевское наместничество, romanized: Kiyevskoye namestnichestvo) was an administrative-territorial unit (namestnichestvo) of the Russian Empire, which existed in 1781–1796. It was created in the process of Catherine's reforms initiated by edict of November 7, 1775.

== Description ==
On September 16, 1781, an edict was issued to transform the governorate into a viceroyalty, with the effective date of January 9, 1782. The viceroyalty was subdivided into the following counties (uyezds):

- Kiev
- Gorodishche
- Goltva
- Khorol
- Kozelets
- Lubny
- Mirgorod
- Ostyor
- Pereyaslavl
- Piryatin
- Zolotonosha

Note that some sources state that the towns of Khorol and Gorodishche were included without their districts.

In 1789, Gorodishche county was transferred to the Yekaterinoslav Governorate. In 1791, the Kiev Viceroyalty was subdivided into ten okrugs, and in early 1790s additional districts (uyezds) of Bohuslav, Gadyach, Kaniv, Zinkiv, Korsun, and Lokhvytsia were added.

On June 4, 1782, the coat of arms of Kiev was officially approved, which de facto became a coat of arms of the viceroyalty. According to the description, Archangel Michael was to be dressed in silver holding up an aglow sword, depicted on an azure shield.

== Governors ==
=== Governor-generals (viceroys) ===
- 1782–1796 – Petr Rumyantsev
  - 1791–1793 – Mikhail Krechetnikov, (acting)
  - 1793–1794 – Osip Igelstrom, (acting)

=== Viceroyalty governors ===
- 1782–1795 – Semen Shirkov
- 1796 – 17.06.1797 Vasiliy Krasno-Milashevich
