= Kiev Governorate =

1802–1925 administrative unit

Coordinates: 50.4500°N 30.5236°E

- Governorate Southwestern
- 1802–1925
- Coat of arms

- Location in the Russian Empire before World War I
- Capital: Kiev (now Kyiv, Ukraine)
- Area
  - (1897): 50,957 km^{2} (19,675 sq mi)
- Population
  - (1897): 3,559,229
- History
  - Established: 1802
  - Abolished: 1925
Preceded by
Little Russia Governorate
Kremenchuk Governorate
Chernigov Governorate
Poltava Governorate
Succeeded by
Kremenchuk Governorate
Kyiv Okruha
Bila Tserkva Okruha
Berdychyv Okruha
Cherkasy Okruha
Uman Okruha
Volyn Okruha
Korosten Okruha

Kiev Governorate (Note: Russian: Киевская губерния, pre-1918: Кіевская губернія, romanized: Kiyevskaya guberniya; Ukrainian: Київська губернія, romanized: Kyïvsʼka huberniia) was an administrative-territorial unit (guberniya) of the Russian Empire (1796–1917), Ukrainian People's Republic (1917–18; 1918–1921), Ukrainian State (1918), and the Ukrainian Soviet Socialist Republic (1919–1925; part of the Soviet Union since 1922). It included the territory of the right-bank Ukraine and was formed after a division of the Kiev Viceroyalty into Kiev and Little Russia Governorates in 1796. Its capital was in Kiev. By the early 20th century, it consisted of 12 uyezds, 12 cities, 111 miasteczkos and 7344 other settlements. In 1923, it was divided into several okrugs and on 6 June 1925 it was abolished by the Soviet administrative reforms.

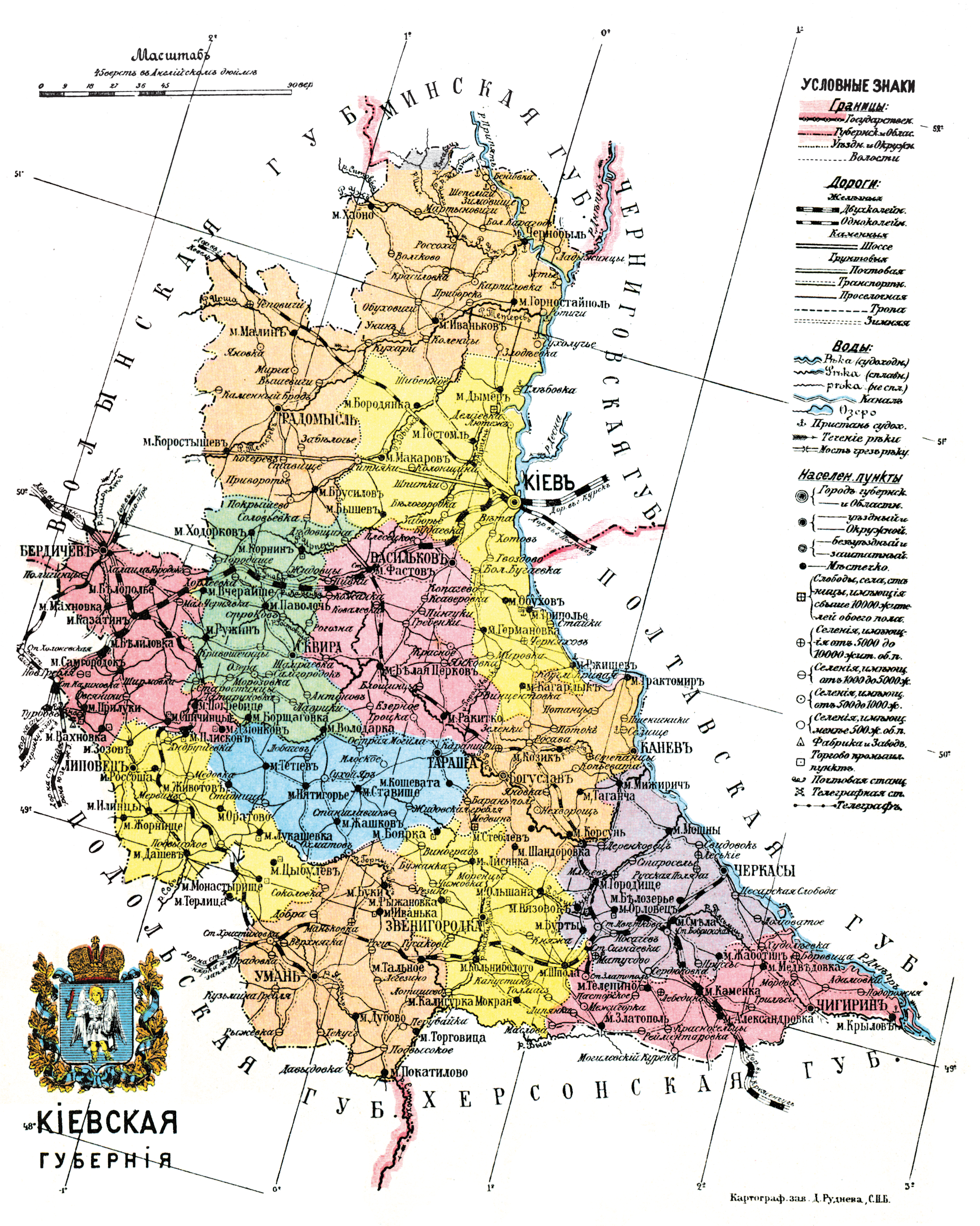
Kiev Governorate in 1913

== History ==
Kiev Governorate on the right bank of Dnieper was officially established by Emperor Paul I's edict of November 30, 1796. However it was not until 1800 when the first governor was appointed. Prior to such, the territory was governed by the Kiev Viceroy Vasiliy Krasno-Milashevich (in 1796 –1800).

Three existing Left-bank Ukraine viceroyalties were merged into one Little Russia Governorate centered on Chernigov, while the Kiev Governorate now centered on Right-bank Ukraine. With Kiev still the capital, the governorate included the right-bank parts of the former Kiev Viceroyalty merged with territories of the former Kiev and Bracław Voivodeships which were gained by the Russian Empire from the partitions of the Polish–Lithuanian Commonwealth (the lands of the Polish Crown province). The edict took effect on August 29, 1797, bringing the total number of uyezds to twelve.

On January 22, 1832, the Kiev Governorate, along with the Volhynia and the Podolia Governorates formed the Kiev Governorate General, also known as the Southwestern Krai. At the time, Vasily Levashov was appointed the Military Governor of Kiev as well as the General Governor of Podolia and Volhynia. In 1845, the population of the Governorate was 1,704,661.

At the turn of the 20th century, the governorate included twelve uyezds named by their centers: Berdychiv, Cherkasy, Chyhyryn, Kaniv, Kiev, Lipovets, Radomyshl, Skvyra, Tarashcha, Uman, Vasylkiv and Zvenyhorodka.

By the 1897 Russian Census, there were 3,559,229 people in the guberniya making it the most populous one in all of the Russian Empire. Most of the population was rural. There were 459,253 people living in cities, including about 248,000 in Kiev. According to individuals' mother tongue, the census classified the respondents as follows: 2,819,145 Malorossy (Ukrainians) representing 79.2% of the population, 430,489 Jews representing 12.1% of the population, 209,427 Velikorossy (Russians) representing 5.9% of the population, and 68,791 Poles representing 1.9% of the population. By faith, 2,983,736 census respondents were Orthodox Christians, 433,728 were Jews and 106,733 were of the Roman Catholic Church.

The estimated population in 1906 was 4,206,100.

Kiev Governorate remained a constituent unit of the larger Governorate General with Kiev being the capital of both well into the 20th century. In 1915, the General Governorate was disbanded while the guberniya continued to exist.

== Administrative division ==
Kiev Governorate consisted of 12 uyezds (their administrative centres in brackets):

County		County Town	Arms of County Town	Area	Population (1897 census)
Transliteration name	Russian Cyrillic	County Town	Arms of County Town	Area	Population (1897 census)
Berdichevsky	Бердичевский	Berdichev		3,361.7 km^{2} (1,298.0 mi^{2})	279,695
Vasilkovsky	Васильковский	Vasilkov		4,508.6 km^{2} (1,740.8 mi^{2})	315,823
Zvenigorodsky	Звенигородский	Zvenigorodka		3,293.3 km^{2} (1,271.6 mi^{2})	274,704
Kanevsky	Каневский	Kanev		3,264.6 km^{2} (1,260.5 mi^{2})	268,860
Kievsky	Киевский	Kiev		5,642.5 km^{2} (2,178.6 mi^{2})	541,483
Lipovetsky	Липовецкий	Lipovets		2,891.3 km^{2} (1,116.3 mi^{2})	211,825
Radomyslsky	Радомысльский	Radomyshl		9,592.7 km^{2} (3,703.8 mi^{2})	315,629
Skvirsky	Сквирский	Skvira		3,721.5 km^{2} (1,436.9 mi^{2})	251,257
Tarashchansky	Таращанский	Tarashcha		3,339.4 km^{2} (1,289.3 mi^{2})	245,752
Umansky	Уманский	Uman		4,295.2 km^{2} (1,658.4 mi^{2})	320,744
Cherkassky	Черкасский	Cherkassy		3,599.6 km^{2} (1,389.8 mi^{2})	307,542
Chigirinsky	Чигиринский	Chigirin		3,273.8 km^{2} (1,264.0 mi^{2})	225,915

== Demographics ==
Population by spoken language in Kiev Governorate (1897)
Language	Native speakers	Percentage
Ukrainian	2,819,145	79.2%
Yiddish	430,489	12.0%
Russian	209,427	5.8%
Polish	68,791	1.9%
German	14,707	0.4%
Belarusian	6,389	0.1%
Czech	3,294	0.09%
Tatar	1,954	0.05%
Romani	884	0.02%
Other languages	4.149	0.1%
Total	3,559,229	100.00

== Principal cities ==
Russian Empire Census of 1897

- Kiev – 247,723 (Russian – 134 278, Ukrainian – 55 064, Jewish – 29 937, Polish – 16 579, German – 4 354, Belarusian – 2 797)
- Berdichev – 53,351 (Jewish – 41 125, Russian – 4 612, Ukrainian – 4 395)
- Uman – 31,016 (Jewish – 17 709, Ukrainian – 9 509, Russian – 2 704)
- Cherkassy – 29,600 (Ukrainian – 12 900, Jewish – 10 916, Russian – 4 911)
- Skvira – 17,958 (Jewish – 8 905, Ukrainian – 7 681, Russian – 956)
- Zvenigorodka – 16,923 (Ukrainian – 8 337, Jewish – 6 368, Russian – 1 513)
- Vasilkov – 13,132 (Ukrainian – 7 108, Jewish – 5 140, Russian – 820)
- Tarascha – 11,259 (Ukrainian – 5 601, Jewish – 4 906, Russian – 575)
- Radomysl – 10,906 (Jewish – 7 468, Ukrainian – 2 463, Russian – 778)

Smaller cities

- Chigirin – 9,872 (Ukrainian – 6 578, Jewish – 2 921, Russian – 343)
- Kanev – 8,855 (Ukrainian – 5 770, Jewish – 2 710, Russian – 303)
- Lipovets – 8,658 (Jewish – 4 117, Ukrainian – 3 948, Russian – 397)

== After 1917 ==
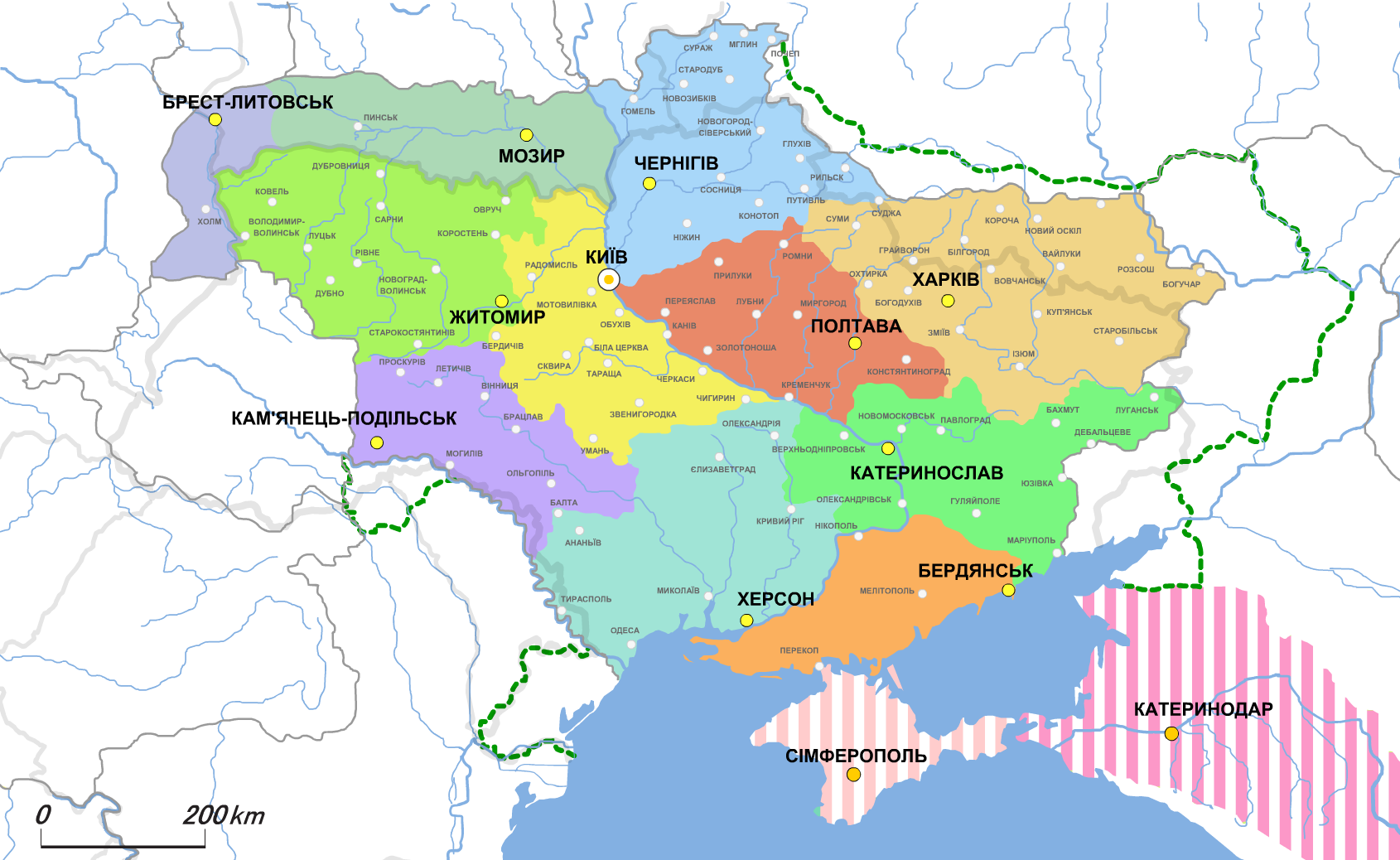
Kiev Governorate (yellow) as part of the Ukrainian State, 1918

In the times after the Russian revolution in 1917–1921, the lands of the Kiev Governorate switched hands on several occasions. After the last Imperial governor Alexey Ignatyev (who ruled until March 6, 1917) fell from power, the local leaders were appointed by competing authorities. At times, the Governorate appointed by the Central Rada and the Governorate appointed by the Communists both claimed sole authority over the Governorate, while some of the short-lived ruling regimes of the territory did not establish any particular administrative subdivision.

Under the Russian Provisional Government administrative power in the governorates was transferred to commissars, who preserved their positions after the proclamation of Ukrainian People's Republic in November 1917. Their power was mostly nominal due to the growth of Bolshevik Soviet influence, especially in industrial areas. After the return of Central Rada in March 1918 new commissars were appointed along with military commandants. After the establishment of the Hetmanate, in May 1918 those were replaced with Governorate starosts. In Kiev Governorate the post of starost was taken by former Tarnopol governor Ivan Chartoryzhski.

The Soviet Ukrainian authority re-established the Governorate, whose leading post was titled the Chairman of the Governorate's Revolutionary Committee (revkom) or of the Executive Committee (ispolkom).

In the course of an administrative reform the Kiev Governorate of the Ukrainian SSR was transformed into six okruhas in 1924-1925. In 1932, the Kyiv Okruha was transformed into an oblast.

=== List of okruhas ===
- Berdychiv Okruha
- Bila Tserkva Okruha
- Kiev Okruha
- Malyn Okruha (1923–24)
- Uman Okruha
- Cherkasy Okruha
- Shevchenko Okruha (1923–25, initially as Korsun)

== Governors of Kiev ==
=== Russian Empire ===
- 1839–1852 Ivan Funduklei
- 1852–1855 Andrei Krivtsov (acting)
- 1855–1864 Pavel Gesse
- 1864–1866 Nikolai Kaznakov
- 1866–1868 Nikolai Eiler
- 1868–1871 Mikhail Katakazi
- 1881–1885 Sergei Gudim-Levkovich
- 1885–1898 Lev Tomara
- 1898–1903 Fyodor Trepov
- 1903–1905 Pavel Savvich
- 1905–1905 Aleksandr Vatatsi
- 1905–1906 Pavel Savvich
- 1906–1906 Aleksei Veretennikov
- 1906–1907 Pavel Kurlov (acting)
- 1907–1909 Pavel Ignatiev
- 1909–1912 Aleksei Girs
- 1912–1915 Nikolai Sukovkin
- 1915–1917 Aleksei Ignatiev

=== Russian Republic ===
as Governing Commissioners

- 1917–1917 Mikhail Sukovkin
- 1917–1918 Oleksandr Salikovsky

=== Ukrainian State ===
as Governing Elders

- 1918–1918 Ivan Chartoryzhski

=== South Russia ===
- 1918 –1919 Andrei Cherniavsky

=== Soviet governors ===
- 1919–1919 Yakov Yakovlev
- 1919–1920 Abram Glinski
- 1920–1920 Ivan Klimenko
- 1920–1920 Panas Lyubchenko
- 1920–1920 Yan Gamarnik
- 1920–1921 Aleksandr Odintsov
- 1921–1921 Nikolai Golubenko
- 1921–1923 Lavrenty Kartvelishvili
- 1923–1923 Vladimir Loginov
- 1923–1924 Juozas Vareikis
- 1924–1924 Lavrenty Kartvelishvili
- 1924–1925 Pavel Postyshev

== Maps ==
Kiev Governorate as of 1896.

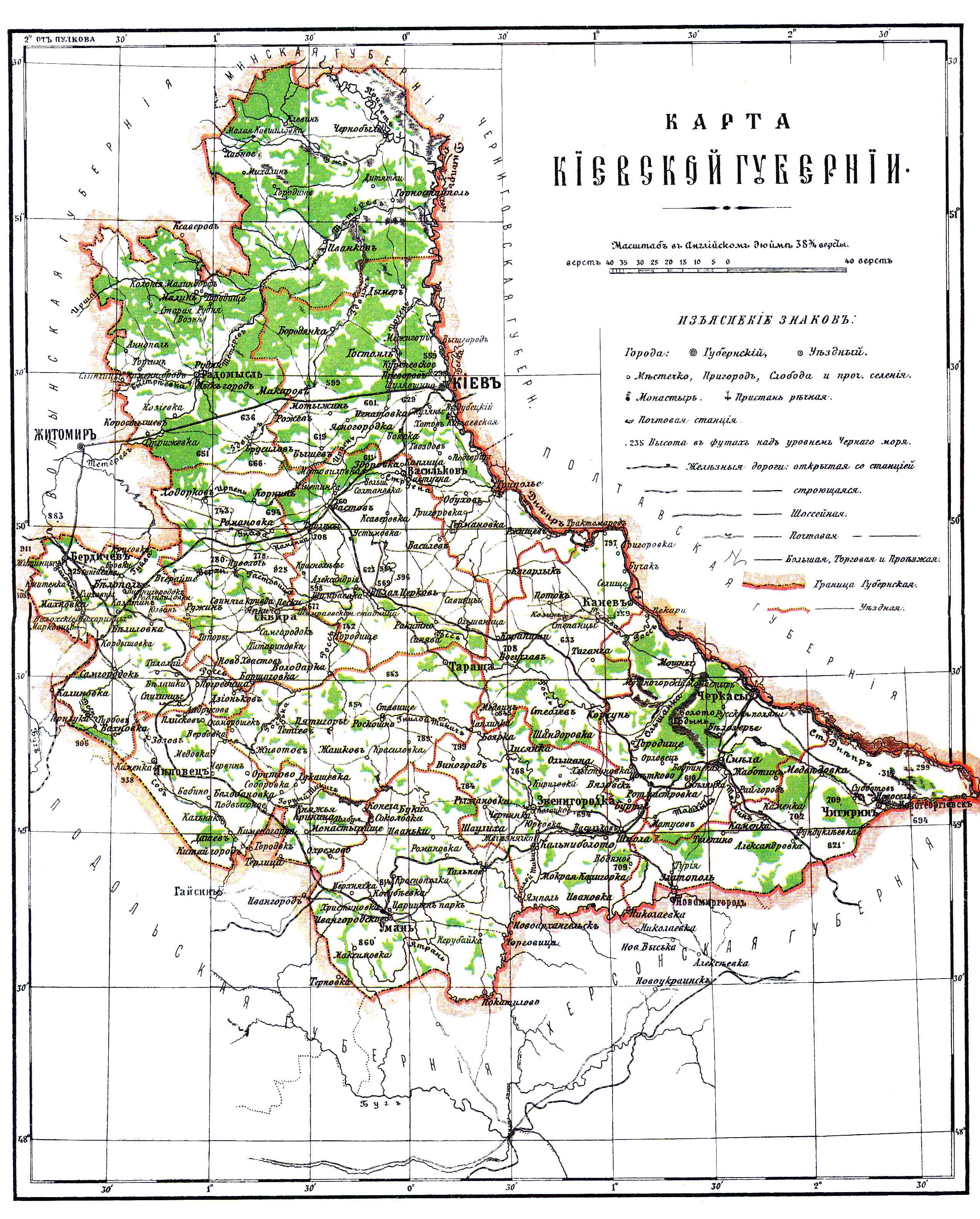
Kiev Governorate as of c. 1900

== See also ==
- Southwestern Krai
