= Olha Bohomolets =

Ukrainian physician, singer, and politician

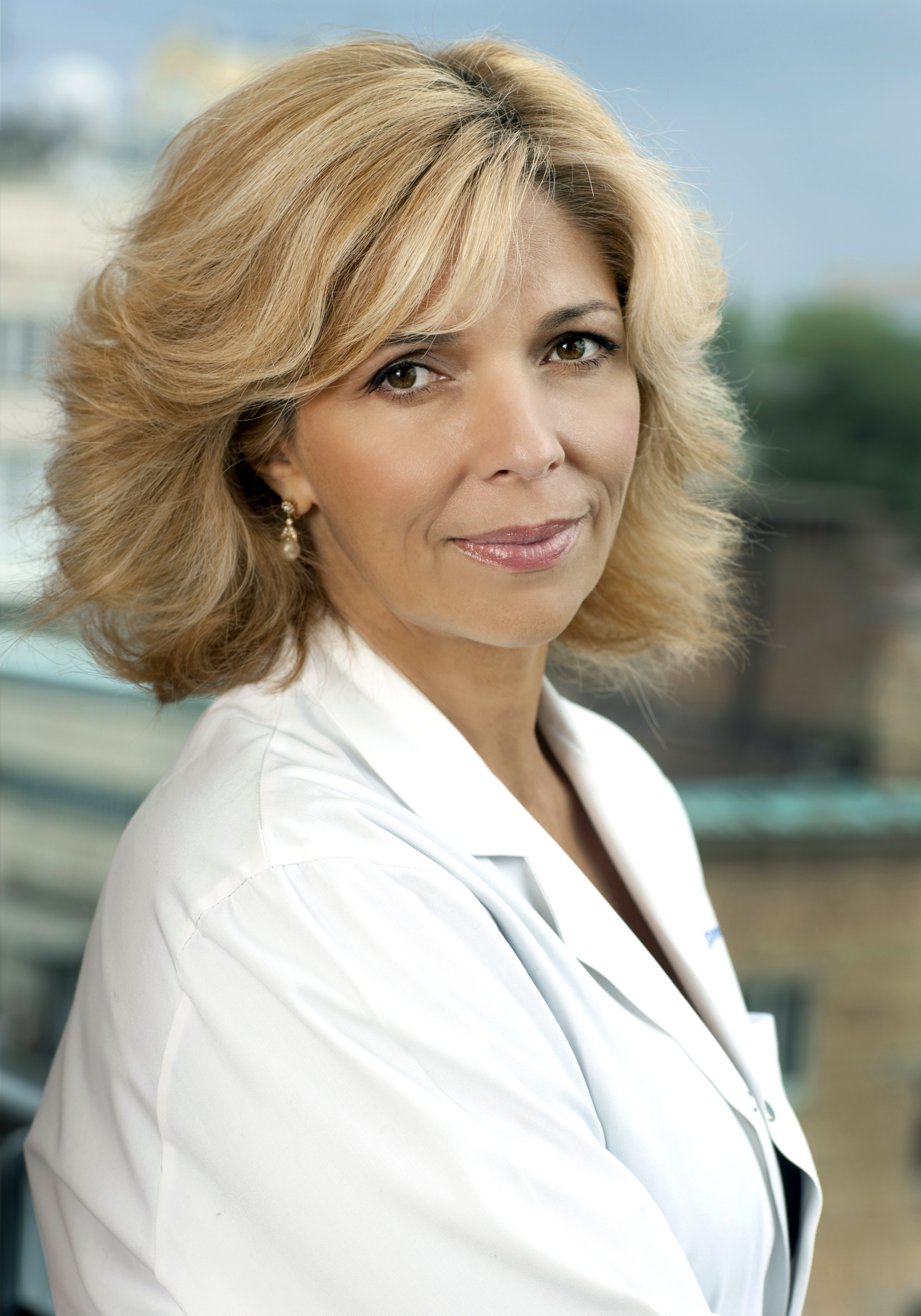
- Born: Ольга Вадимівна Богомолець; March 22, 1966 (age 60); Kyiv, Ukraine
- Education: Bogomolets National Medical University
- Occupations: physician, singer, songwriter
- Spouse: Ihor Kyrylyuk
- Children: 4

Olha Vadymivna Bohomolets (Ukrainian: Ольга Вадимівна Богомолець, Russian: Ольга Вадимовна Богомолец, romanized: Olga Vadimovna Bogomolets, Belarusian: Вольга Вадзіміўна Багамолец, romanized: Voĺha Vadzimiŭna Bahamoliec; born March 22, 1966) is a Ukrainian physician, singer and songwriter. She is an honoured Doctor of Ukraine, the founder and chief doctor of the Institute of Dermatology and Cosmetology.

In 2014, she was appointed as a counselor on humanitarian issues to the President of Ukraine. She is also a former MP and former chairman of the Committee of Verkhovna Rada (Parliament of Ukraine) on Health Issues.

== Biography ==
Olha Bohomolets was born on March 22, 1966, in Kyiv, in a family of doctors. On her mother's side, she comes from Lithuanian-Ruthenian nobility of the Pomian coat of arms. She is a great-granddaughter of Aleksandr Bogomolets.

In 1989, she graduated from Kyiv Medical Institute (now the Bogomolets National Medical University, Kyiv). From 1993–1994, she studied in the Pennsylvania Medical University and the Bernard Ackerman's Institute of Dermatopathology in Philadelphia, US.

After returning home from the US, she started her own Clinic of Laser Medicine, now known as the Dr. Bogomolets' Institute of Dermatology and Cosmetology.

Since 2003 she been as the chief doctor of the Institute of Dermatology and Cosmetology. From December 2004 to October 2005, Bohomolets was the personal physician of Victor Yushchenko, the then President of Ukraine.

Bohomolets is the organizer of the annual nationwide charitable campaign "Day of Melanoma".

In 2012, she founded a telemedical project for distant diagnosis of skin new formations «Institute of Teledermatology»

She is the author of more than 70 research works on dermatology and owner of nine patents for inventions in this branch of medicine. Bohomolets is a member of the American Academy of Dermatology, the European Academy of Dermatology and Venerology, and the New York Academy of Sciences.

Since 2010 Bohomolets has been the author and curator of the course of lectures for doctors on basic dermato-oncology and dermatoscopy in Kharkiv Medical University.

Bohomolets took part in the Revolution of Dignity in Ukraine (2013-2014). In November 2013, she encouraged her students to take part in the Euromaidan protests. She also organized and coordinated medical service of Maidan during the revolution. She was honoured by the Award of Lech Wałęsa Foundation in 2014, together with some other participants of revolutionary events in Kyiv.

After the revolution, she ran for president in Ukraine's position. In the 2014 Ukrainian presidential election, Bohomolets received 1.91% of the vote.

On September 1, 2014, Bohomolets was appointed a counselor of President Petro Poroshenko.

In the 2014 Ukrainian parliamentary election, Bohomolets was elected an MP, being in the top 10 of the electoral list of the Petro Poroshenko Bloc.

Since December 4, 2014, Bohomolets has been chairman of the Parliamentarian Health Care Commission.

Bohomolets started the public health platform "Ukraine 80+" to increase life expectancy of Ukrainians to 80 years (2014-2015).

In 2015, Bohomolets was the co-ordinator of the preparations of the first Military-Medical Doctrine's project for Ukraine (2015). She also started the public platform "People helping people" for direct targeted assistance to the families of those killed during the Revolution of Dignity and of the soldiers killed while defending Ukraine against Russia's invasion of the Donbass area (2014-2015).

On 15 June 2018, former First Lady Hanna Turchynova sparked controversy by claiming that there is no discrimination against women in Ukraine and calling representatives of the LGBT community a "deviation from the norm", homosexuality a disease, and a heterosexual family for a child "an ideal to strive for". On 20 June, activists and representatives of human rights organizations demanded that Viktor Andrushchenko, the rector of the National Pedagogical University named after M. P. Dragomanov, dismiss Anna Turchynova due to her public homophobia, referring to Turchynova's blog "Homo-dictatorship. Part 1. How to Corrupt Children." The position of Anna Turchynova was also criticized by the Ministry of Education and Science of Ukraine. Bohomolets, a devout Orthodox Christian mother of four children, defended Turchynova's position and publicly supported it.

Bohomolets was a candidate in the 2019 Ukrainian presidential election; she filed documents with the Central Election Commission on 16 January 2019. In the election, she received 0.17% of the vote. She did not take part in the 2019 Ukrainian parliamentary election.

== Philanthropy ==
Bohomolets is also known as a singer performing modern and old Ukrainian romances on lyrics by Ukrainian poets (Lina Kostenko, Olena Teliha etc.) and her own. She is the winner of the All-Ukrainian singing poetry contest "Oberig" (The Guarding Sign) and international song contests "Sopot" (Poland) and "White Sails" (Ukraine). She won the Special Award of "Radio Liberty" (1991). She plays headlines in Ukraine, USA, France, Sweden, Germany, Poland and in the countries of Central Europe. All her concerts are charitable and aimed to support socially unprotected people and Ukrainian cultural heritage.

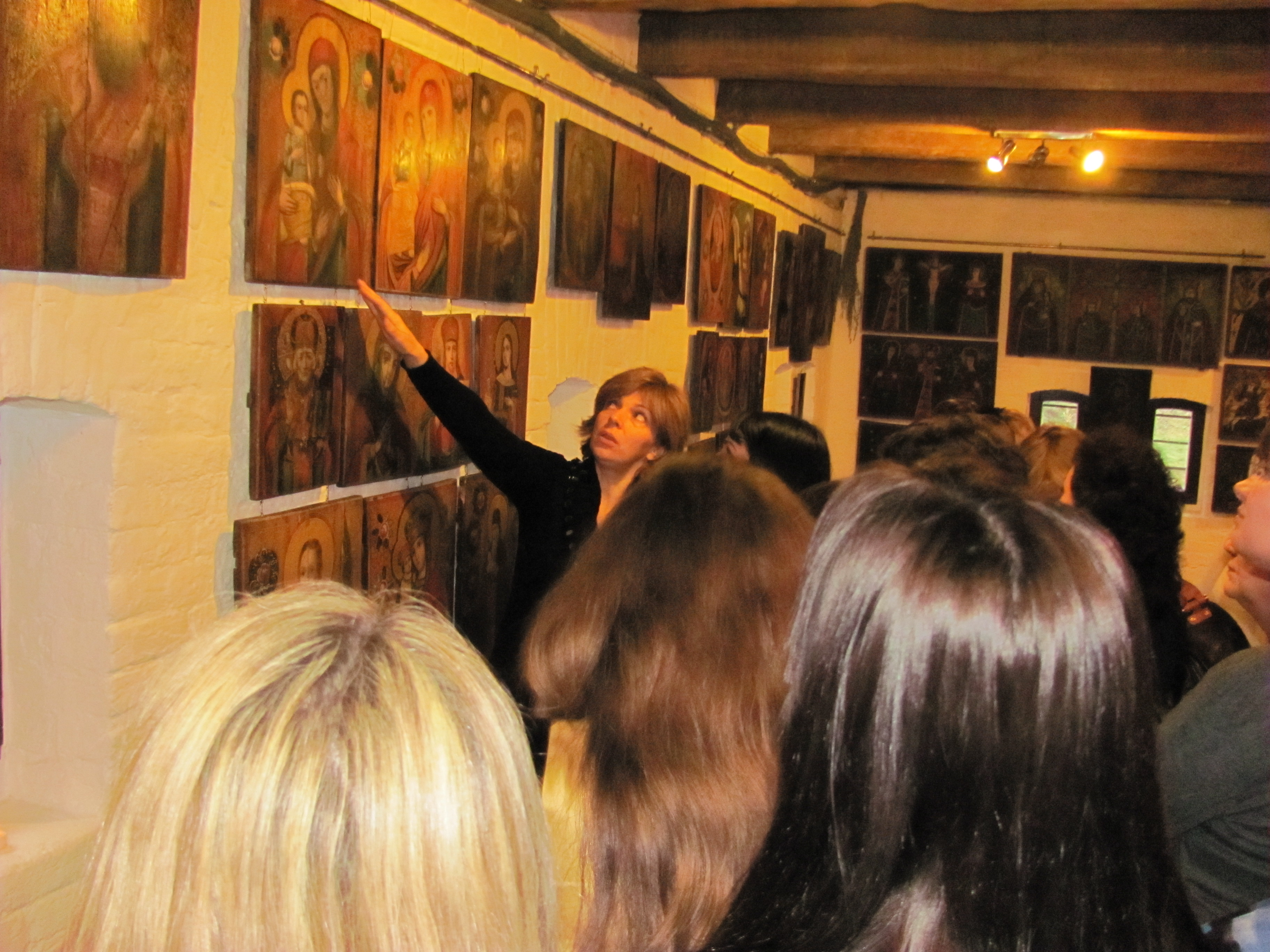
Bohomolets shows her collection to the visitors to the Radomysl Castle

Since 2004, Bohomolets has been arranging exhibitions of Ukrainian home icons from her collection in order to spread the Ukrainian culture and make it popular – both in Ukraine and abroad.

Bohomolets is the founder of the historical and cultural complex "The Radomysl Castle" (2007), comprising the Museum of Ukrainian home icons. She also founded art-hall Kairos in the center of Kyiv. Bohomolets is an organizer of and participant in campaigns against illegal building works ruining historical and cultural relics and monuments of Ukraine.

In 2014, Bohomolets founded the annual International Music Festival "Chopin's music in the open air", which since then traditionally takes place in the Radomysl Castle.
