= Yelysei Pletenetskyi =

Ukrainian head of a monastery

Saint Yelysei (Pletenetskyi)
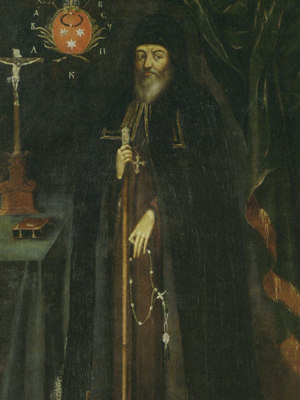
- Yelysei Pletenetskyi

Reverend
- Born: 1550; Galicia
- Died: October 29, 1624 (aged 73–74); Kyiv
- Venerated in: Orthodox Church of Ukraine
- Canonized: 7 November 2024 by Metropolitan Epiphanius of Kyiv
- Feast: 29 October, 2nd Sunday of Lent

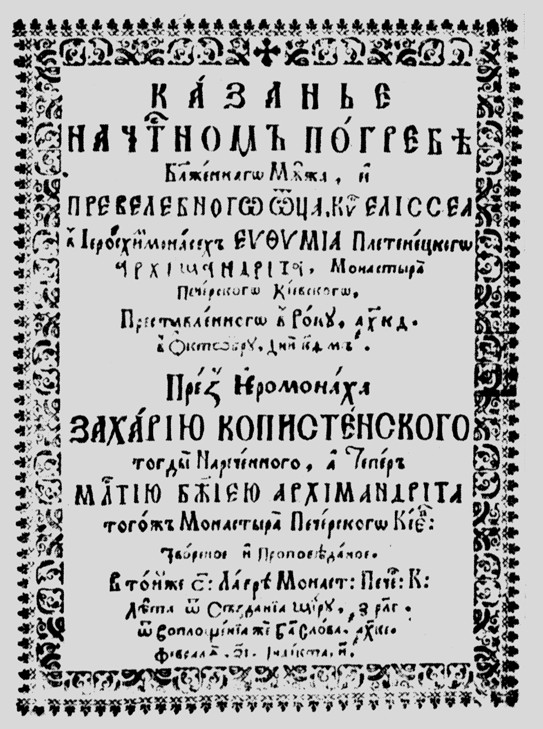
Farewell speech by Zacharias Kopystensky in 1625

Yelysei Pletenetskyi, or Yelysei Pletenetsky (1550 – 29 October 1624), also known as Elizeusz (Elisius) Pletenecki, was a Ukrainian archimandrite of the Polish-Lithuanian Commonwealth. He served as archimandrite of a monastery in the Pinsk region from 1595 to 1599, and of Kyiv Pechersk Lavra from 1599 until his death.

== Life ==
A native of Galicia, Pletenetskyi worked hard at reforming the Kyiv Pechersk monastery, and secured the right of stauropegion for it. He established a hospital for the poor, a printing house, the printing press for which was brought from Striatyn, and the Radomysl paper mill.

Between 1616 and 1630 the printing shop established by Pletenetskyi produced forty titles, becoming the most productive publishing establishment in Ukraine and Belarus. Among the publications were works of literature, history and religious polemic, liturgical texts and school books, including the Slovene-Rus' Lexicon (1627).

Pletenetskyi worked during the times when his Ruthenian Church signed the 1595 Union of Brest and many dioceses (eparchies) along with the metropolitan bishop (episcope) aligned themselves with the Roman Holy See as the Ruthenian Uniate Church. The Reverend Yelysei was against the union.

Pletenetsky attracted a group of notable church and cultural figures at the monastery, including Pamvo Berynda, Stepan Berynda, Job Boretsky (later Metropolitan of Kiev, Galicia and all Rus'), Havrylo Dorofeievych, Zacharias Kopystensky, Taras Zemka, and Lavrentij Zizanij. Under his leadership in 1615 Kyiv received its own Orthodox brotherhood modelled on the Dormition Brotherhood in Lviv. Hetman Petro Konashevych-Sahaidachny became its patron and enlisted his Cossacks into the brotherhood.

In 1620 Reverend Elisius played a key role in petitioning to Patriarch of Jerusalem Theophanes III who stopped in Kyiv in re-establishing of new Eastern Orthodox bishop hierarchy by blessing a new metropolitan bishop Job Boretsky.

Right before his death in 1624, Pletenetsky accepted the Great Schema under name of Euthymius and died as hieroschemamonk. On 17 February 1625 hieroschemamonk Euthymius was buried in the newly restored Holy Dormition temple of the Kyiv Cave Monastery next to the tombstone of the Great Duke of Lithuania Skirgaila and Duchess Eupraxia of Kiev, a sister of Volodymyr Monomakh. His burial did not survive.

== Legacy ==
On 7 November 2024, he was canonized by the Orthodox Church of Ukraine.

Religious titles
Preceded by Nikephoros Tur	Archimandrite of Kyiv Pechersk Lavra; 1599–1624	Succeeded by Zacharias Kopystensky
