= Eparchy of Kyiv (Orthodox Church of Ukraine) =

Central eparchy (diocese) and metropolis of the Orthodox Church of Ukraine

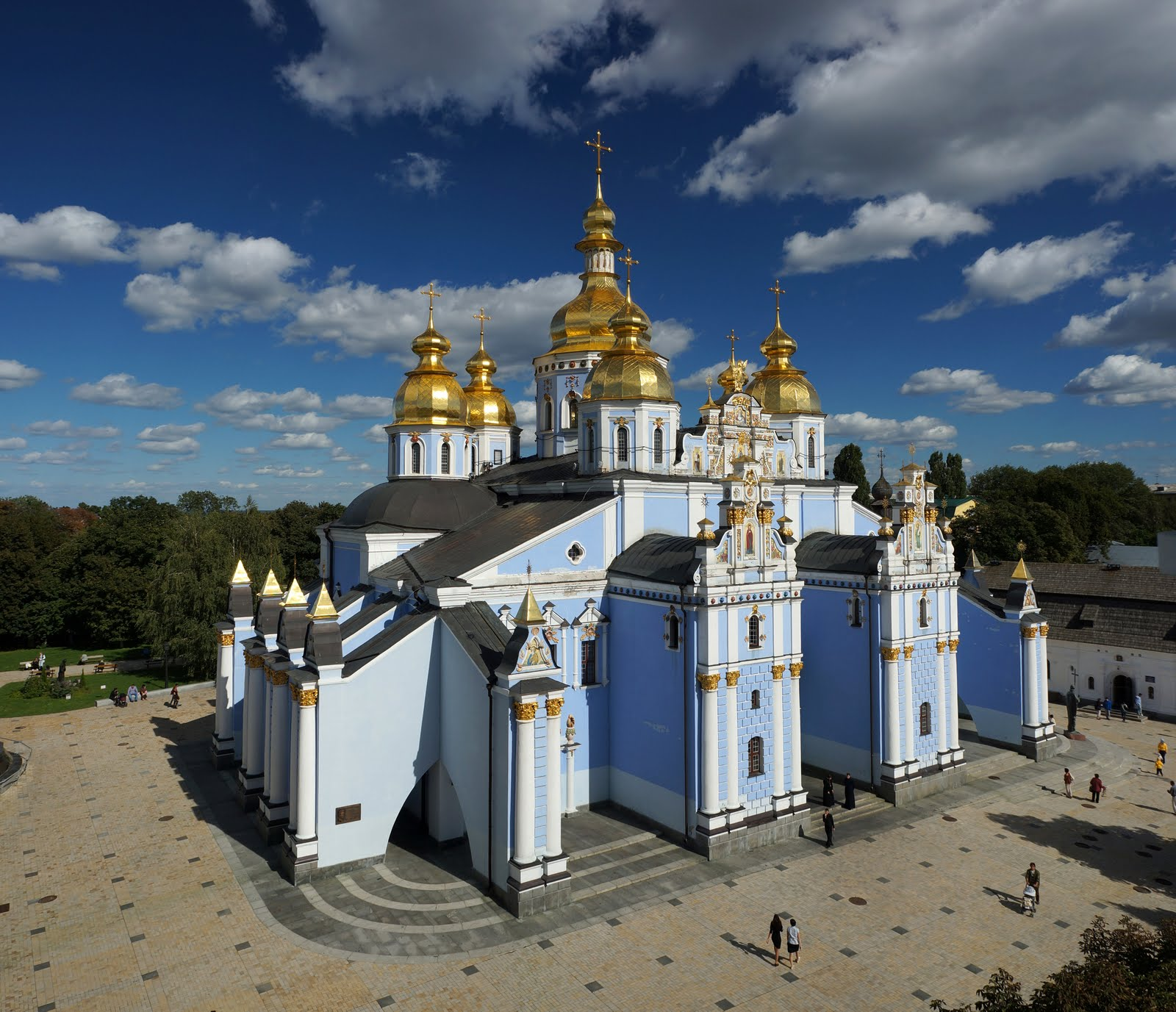
- St. Michael's Golden-Domed Monastery cathedral

Location
- Territory: Kyiv Oblast and Kyiv
- Headquarters: Kyiv

Information
- Denomination: Eastern Orthodox
- Sui iuris church: Orthodox Church of Ukraine
- Established: 891/1620/1990
- Language: Ukrainian

Current leadership
- Governance: Eparchy
- Bishop: Epiphanius of Kyiv

Eparchy of Kyiv (Ukrainian: Київська єпархія) is the central eparchy (diocese) and metropolis of the Orthodox Church of Ukraine. The eparchy covers the territory of Kyiv Oblast and most of the city of Kyiv.

The seat of the Eparchy is the St. Michael's Golden-Domed Monastery cathedral in Kyiv. It is the primatial Eparchy, its head being the Metropolitan of Kyiv and all Ukraine.

Following the 2018 unification council, the eparchy was reorganized, leading to the merger of the Eparchy of Kyiv (Kyiv Patriarchate), the Eparchy of Pereyaslav (Kyiv Patriarchate), and the Eparchy of Kyiv (Ukrainian Autocephalous Orthodox Church).

== History ==
The eparchy claims to trace its heritage to the original eparchy of "Kiev and all Rus'" that dates back to the establishment of the Old Russian (Ruthenian) Church under the jurisdiction of the Ecumenical Patriarchate of Constantinople. The Ruthenian archdiocese of Kiev is first mentioned in 891, as the 60th by rank of honor in the list of departments subordinate to the Patriarch of Constantinople, and 61st in the charter of Emperor Leo (886-911). From its beginnings, the eparchy was the central or primatial diocese of the metropolis, which also included a number of other dioceses that were created after the baptism of Kievan Rus' during the rule of Great Prince Vladimir in 988.

In reality, the eparchy's history starts with the Metropolis of Kiev, Galicia and all Ruthenia which was erected in 1620 and was absorbed by Moscow in 1722, or, as the Russian Orthodox Church would have it, was "transferred" from the ecclesiastical jurisdiction of Ecumenical Patriarchate of Constantinople to the Patriarchate of Moscow.

In the early 18th century, the metropolis was demoted to the rank of an archbishopric during the rule of Tsar Peter I. This lasted until the middle of the century, when the decree of Empress Elizabeth Petrovna elevated it once again to the rank of metropolis. In the 17th and 18th centuries, the diocese of Kyiv consisted of two parts: one on either bank of the Dnieper River, each of which was subsequently ceded to the provinces of Chernihiv and Poltava.

Since 1918, according to the decision of the All-Russian Church Council of 1917-1918, the bishops of Kyiv were once again the heads of not only the diocese of Kyiv, but of an autonomous Church within the borders of Ukraine. After its liquidation by order of Patriarch Tikhon, the Ukrainian Exarchate was established. The Bishops' Council of the Russian Orthodox Church, 25-27 October 1990, established the autonomous and self-governing Ukrainian Orthodox Church, with the Diocese of Kyiv as its primatial diocese.

From 2009 to 2013, the eparchy was split between right-bank (Pereyaslav-Khmelnytskyi) and left-bank (Kyiv and all Ukraine) portions of Kyiv Oblast. In 2013, the division changed with the eparchy covering Kyiv Oblast being headed by the bishop of Pereyaslav and Bila Tserkva, and the City of Kyiv being headed by the Metropolitan of Kyiv and all Ukraine.

During the unification of the Orthodox Church of Ukraine and its reorganization in 2019, the eparchy was merged again, also including the eparchy of Kyiv of the Ukrainian Autocephalous Orthodox Church. The mother church of the Ukrainian Autocephalous Orthodox Church St. Andrew's Church was reserved as a stauropegion church of the Ecumenical Patriarchate of Constantinople since the original see in the Kyiv-Pechersk Lavra is still held by the Russian Orthodox Church.

In 2023, a separate Eparchy of Vyshhorod was created within Vyshhorod Raion, Kyiv Oblast (northern portion). In 2024, another Eparchy of Bila Tserkva was created within Bila Tserkva Raion (southern portion).

== Ruling bishops ==
with episcopal see in Kyiv

=== Metropolitans of Kyiv and all Rus ===
- 988(?)–1004(?) Michael and Leontius
- 988–1018 Theophylact
- 1008(?)–1017(?) John
- 1037(?)–1043(?) Teopempt
- 1051–(?) Hilarion
- 1055(?)–(?) Ephraim
- 1072(?)–(?) George (Jurij)
- 1077(?)–1089 John II Prodrom
- 1090–1091 John III
- 1097–1101(?) Nicholas
- 1104–1121 Nikephoros
- 1122–1126 Nikita
- 1130(?)–1145(?) Michael II
- 1147–1159 Kliment Smoliatich
- 1156–1159 Kostiantyn
- 1161–1163 Teodor
- 1164–1166 John IV
- 1167–1177(?) Costantine II
- (?)–(?) John V
- 1182(?)–1197(?) Nikephoros II
- 1210(?)–1220 Matthew
- 1224–1233 Сyril
- 1237–(?) Joseph
- 1241–1246 Peter (Akerovich) (as Archbishop of Ruthenia),
- 1246–1458 no data

=== Metropolitans of Kyiv, Galicia and all Rus ===
- 1458–1473 Gregory
- 1476–1482 Spyridon
  - 1474–1480 Misail
- 1481–1488 Simeon
- 1488–1494 Jonah Hlezna
- 1495–1497 Macarius I
- 1498-? Joseph the Bulgarian
- Jonah II
- Joseph II
- Joseph III
- Macarius II
- Sylvester
- Jonah III
- Elias
- Onesiphorus
- 1588–1599 Michael

=== Metropolitans of Kyiv, Galicia and all Rus, Exarchate ===
- 1620–1631 Job
- 1631–1633 (Note: The hierarchy which was consecrated in 1620 was legalized by the government in a 1632 agreement that permitted both the disuniate Greek Orthodox and uniate Greek Catholic jurisdictions within the Polish–Lithuanian Commonwealth.) Isaiah
- 1633–1646 Peter III
- 1647–1657 Sylvester
- 1657–1663 Dionisius II
- 1663–1675 Joseph V
- 1663–1679 Anton Vinnicky
- 1679–1685 vacant
- 1685–1990 Russian occupation

=== Metropolitan of Kyiv and all Ukraine, Autocephalous ===
- 1990–2018 Filaret (Denysenko)
- 2018–present Epiphanius of Kyiv

== Established vicar bishops ==
- Vyshhorod — hegumen of St. Michael's Golden-Domed Monastery
- Fastiv (from UAOC, previously as Vyshhorod and Podil) — hegumen of Stauropegion Monastery of Venerable Paisius Velichkovsky (Sevastopol)
- Olbia — in care of Greek diaspora in Ukraine
- Pereyaslav (former post) — rector Kyiv Orthodox Theological Academy (within St. Michael's Golden-Domed Monastery)
- Boryspil (former post) — in charge of parishes in the United States and Canada, vicar of the Ukrainian Orthodox Church
- Bohuslav (from UAOC, previously as Bila Tserkva)
- Bilhorod (from UAOC, previously as Sviatoshyn)
- Makariv
- Vasylkiv

== Bibliography ==
This article incorporates text from List of Metropolitans of Kiev at OrthodoxWiki which is licensed under the CC-BY-SA and GFDL.

- Blažejovskyj, Dmytro (1990). Hierarchy of the Kyivan Church (861–1990). Vydanni͡a Ukraïnsʹkoho katolʹytsʹkoho universytetu im. Sv. Klymenta Papy Editiones Universitatis Catholicae Ucrainorum S. Clementis Papae Sacrum Ucrainae millenium. Vol. 72. Rome: [Ukraïnsʹkyĭ katolyt͡sʹkyĭ universytet im. Sv. Klymenta Papy]. OCLC 22834909.
- Subtelny, Orest (2009). Ukraine: a history (4th ed.). Toronto [u.a.]: University of Toronto Press. ISBN 978-1-44269728-7.
