= 1397 =

1397 in various calendars
- Gregorian calendar: 1397; MCCCXCVII
- Ab urbe condita: 2150
- Armenian calendar: 846; ԹՎ ՊԽԶ
- Assyrian calendar: 6147
- Balinese saka calendar: 1318–1319
- Bengali calendar: 803–804
- Berber calendar: 2347
- English Regnal year: 20 Ric. 2 – 21 Ric. 2
- Buddhist calendar: 1941
- Burmese calendar: 759
- Byzantine calendar: 6905–6906
- Chinese calendar: 丙子年 (Fire Rat); 4094 or 3887 — to — 丁丑年 (Fire Ox); 4095 or 3888
- Coptic calendar: 1113–1114
- Discordian calendar: 2563
- Ethiopian calendar: 1389–1390
- Hebrew calendar: 5157–5158
- Hindu calendars
- Vikram Samvat: 1453–1454
- Shaka Samvat: 1318–1319
- Kali Yuga: 4497–4498
- Holocene calendar: 11397
- Igbo calendar: 397–398
- Iranian calendar: 775–776
- Islamic calendar: 799–800
- Japanese calendar: Ōei 4 (応永４年)
- Javanese calendar: 1311–1312
- Julian calendar: 1397; MCCCXCVII
- Korean calendar: 3730
- Minguo calendar: 515 before ROC 民前515年
- Nanakshahi calendar: −71
- Thai solar calendar: 1939–1940
- Tibetan calendar: མེ་ཕོ་བྱི་བ་ལོ་ (male Fire-Rat); 1523 or 1142 or 370 — to — མེ་མོ་གླང་ལོ་ (female Fire-Ox); 1524 or 1143 or 371

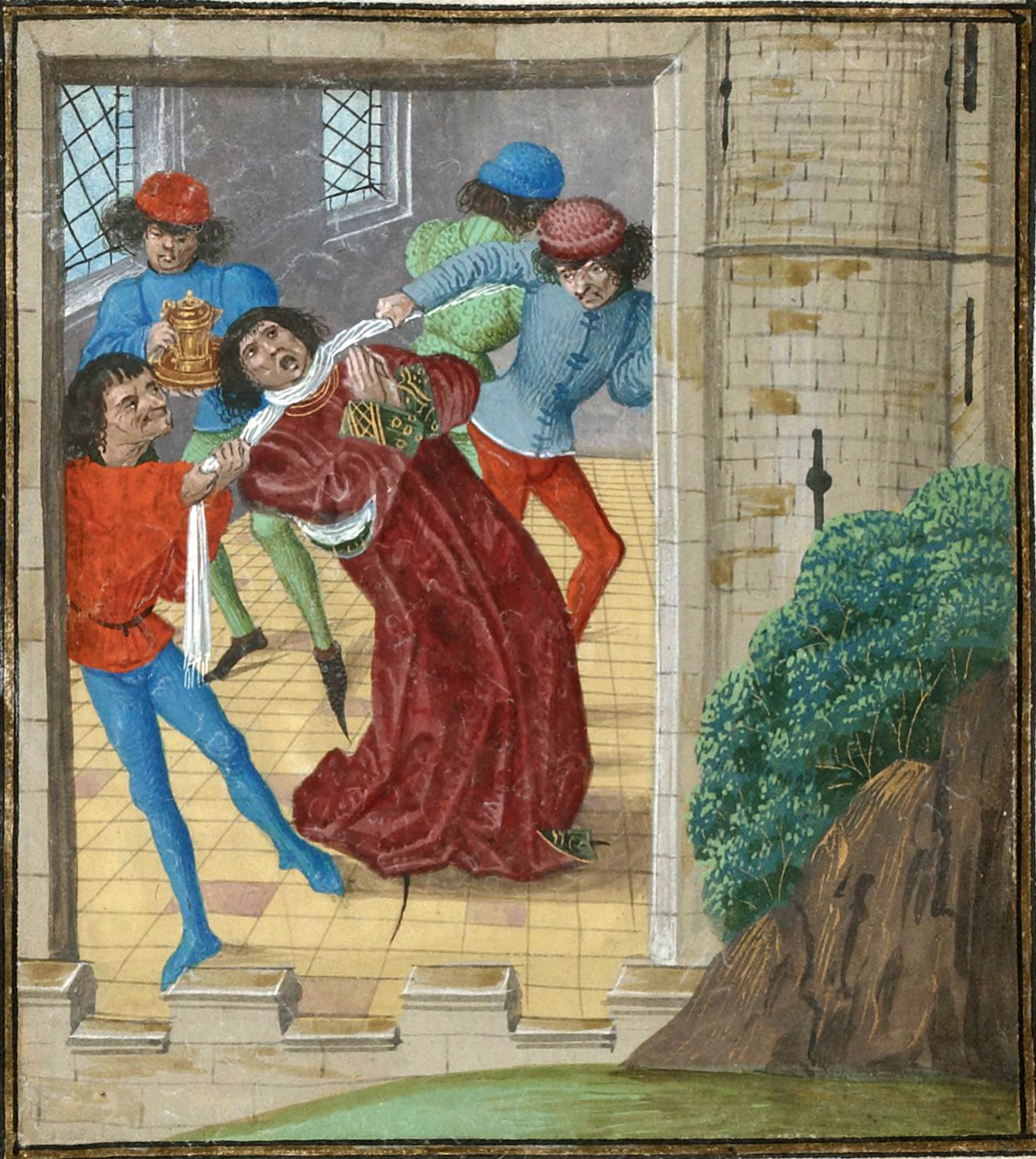
September 9: Thomas, Duke of Gloucester, uncle of King Richard II and accused conspirator against the King, is assassinated while under house arrest in Calais.

Year 1397 (MCCCXCVII) was a common year starting on Monday of the Julian calendar.

== Events ==
=== January–March ===
- January 8 – Isabella of Valois, the 7-year-old wife of King Richard II since their marriage on October 31, is formally crowned as Queen consort of England at Westminster Abbey.
- January 22 – The 23rd Parliament of King Richard II of England assembles after having been summoned on November 30, and re-elects Sir John Bussy as the Speaker of the House of Commons, then meets for three weeks.
- January –
  - Tran Thuan Tong, the Vietnamese Emperor of Dai Viet since 1388, moves the imperial capital from Thang Long to Thanh Hóa.
  - Mircea I takes back the throne of Wallachia.
- February 10 – John Beaufort becomes Earl of Somerset in England.
- February 12 – The English Parliament adjourns, and King Richard II gives royal assent to several acts passed, including the Act against riding with weapons, and barring the carrying of a lancegay (a light spear) except in wartime. Another law places a penalty on "him who taketh another's horse or best for the King's service without sufficient warrant.
- March 18 – The Duchy of Milan, led by Gian Galeazzo Visconti, declares war against the Republic of Florence, led by Chancellor Coluccio Salutati, on the Italian peninsula.
- March 28 – King Charles VI of France and King Richard II of England sign a treaty settling the final issues remaining from the War of the Breton Succession, restoring the land confiscated from John IV, Duke of Brittany.

=== April–June ===
- April 20 – At Kalaburagi in the Bahmani Kingdom (now in India's state of Karnataka) Ghiyath-ad-din Shah becomes the new Shah upon the death of his father, Mohammed Shah II.
- May 17 – Callistus II Xanthopoulos becomes the new Patriarch to lead the Eastern Orthodox Church after the death of the previous Patriarch Antony IV.
- June 14 – Shams-ud-Din Shah becomes the new Shah of the Bahmani Kingdom (now in India's state of Karnataka) upon the death of his brother, Ghiyath-ad-din Shah.
- June 17 – Erik of Pomerania is crowned in Kalmar (Sweden) as ruler of the Kalmar Union, a personal union of the three kingdoms of Denmark, Norway (with Iceland, Greenland, the Faroe Islands, Shetland and Orkney) and Sweden (including Finland and Åland) engineered by Queen Margaret I of Denmark, his great-aunt and adoptive mother, who retains de facto power in the realm.

=== July–December ===
- July 12 – King Richard II of England orders the arrest of members of a group of powerful barons known as the Lords Appellant, including Thomas of Woodstock, Duke of Gloucester and Richard Fitzalan, Earl of Arundel. Gloucester is murdered while under house arrest on September 9 and Arundel is beheaded on September 21.
- August 28 – As part of a division of the state of Holstein, the northernmost member of the Holy Roman Empire, between Count Albert II and his brother Count Gerhard VI (following the death of their uncle, Nicholas), Gerhard receives the Duchy of Schleswig and nearly all of Rendsburg, while Albert receives HOlstein-Segeberg.
- September 9 – While under house arrest at Calais, awaiting trial for treason against his nephew, King Richard II of England, Thomas of Woodstock, Duke of Gloucester is assassinated.
- September 29
  - John Holland, Earl of Huntingdon is created Duke of Exeter, by his half-brother King Richard II of England.
  - Thomas Holland, 3rd Earl of Kent, John's brother, is created Duke of Surrey by King Richard.
  - Ralph Neville, Baron Neville is created first Earl of Westmorland.
- October 13 – Richard Whittington, Lord Mayor of London since June 8 when he was chosen by King Richard II following the June 6 death of the Lord Mayor Adam Bamme, is overwhelmingly approved by London's freemen to serve permanently after Whittington had negotiated a deal to settle its debt to the King for £10,000.
- October –
  - The Lin Kuan rebellion by the Kam people and Miao people of China in the Huguang province (now parts of the Hubei and Hunan provinces, against the Ming dynasty, ends after less than a year as Lin Kuan and his surviving followers are executed. Historical accounts indicate that more than 21,000 of the Kam civilians were killed during the suppression of the insurrection.
  - Matthew I of Constantinople becomes the new Patriarch to lead the Eastern Orthodox Church to replace the previous Patriarch, Callistus II Xanthopoulos.
- November 8 – Thomas Arundel, accused of high treason by King Richard II of England, is replaced by Roger Walden as Archbishop of Canterbury.
- December 31 – The Peace of Breno is signed in Val Camonica to temporarily halt the fighting between the Guelphs (who favor the Republic of Venice) and the Ghibellines (who favor the Duchy of Milan) in the fighting between the two nations.

=== Date unknown ===
- The Ottomans capture the town of Vidin, the capital of the Tsardom of Vidin, the only remaining independent Bulgarian state. Emperor Ivan Sratsimir of Vidin is taken prisoner by early this year and later disappears while his son Constantine II becomes Emperor in his place.
- Temür Qutlugh is crowned as the Khan of Golden Horde with the help of general Edigu, although Edigu continues to hold the real power.
- The Università, a form of local government, is established in Malta.
- The Kirillo-Belozersky Monastery is founded in northwestern Russia.
- The Sretensky Monastery is founded in Moscow.
- The first hospital in al-Andalus is created, at Granada.
- Neuhausergasse 4, the brewer of Spaten, is listed on the register of Munich breweries.
- Gregory of Tatev writes the Book of Questions, a ten-volume encyclopedic work, at the Tatev Monastery, in Armenia.

== Births ==
- February 21 – Infanta Isabel, Duchess of Burgundy (d. 1471)
- May 15 – Sejong the Great of Joseon, ruler of Korea (d. 1450)
- August 10 – Albert II of Germany, Holy Roman Emperor (d. 1439)
- November 15 – Pope Nicholas V (d. 1455)
- date unknown
  - Chimalpopoca, Aztec ruler of Tenochtitlán (d. 1427)
  - Tlacaelel, Aztec nobleman (d. 1487)
  - Paolo dal Pozzo Toscanelli, Italian mathematician (d. 1482)
  - John de Ros, 7th Baron Ros, English noble and soldier (d. 1421)
  - Paolo Uccello, Florentine painter (d. 1475)

== Deaths ==
- January 11 – Skirgaila, Grand Duke of Lithuania
- February 18 – Enguerrand VII, Lord of Coucy (b. 1340)
- March 14 – Henry VIII the Sparrow, Duke of Żagań–Głogów (b. c. 1357)
- April 25 – Thomas Holland, 2nd Earl of Kent (b. 1350)
- June 3 – William Montacute, 2nd Earl of Salisbury, English military leader (b. 1328)
- June 16 – Philip of Artois, Count of Eu, French soldier (b. 1358)
- July 15 – Catherine of Henneberg, German ruler (b. c. 1334)
- September 2 – Francesco Landini, Italian composer
- September 8 – Thomas of Woodstock, 1st Duke of Gloucester, son of King Edward III of England (b. 1355)
- September 15 – Adam Easton, English cardinal
- September 21 – Richard FitzAlan, 11th Earl of Arundel, English military leader (executed) (b. 1346)
- October 6 – Vuk Branković, Serbian lord (b. 1345)
