= Bull of Union with the Greeks =

1439 papal bull reuniting the Catholic and Eastern Orthodox Churches

Laetentur Caeli Latin for 'Let the Heavens Rejoice' Encyclical of Pope Eugene IV
- Signature date: 6 July 1439
- Subject: Reunited the Roman Catholic and Eastern Orthodox Churches
- Text: In Latin

Laetentur Caeli: Bulla Unionis Graecorum (Note: Sometimes also spelled as Laetentur Coeli, Laetantur Caeli, Lætentur Cæli, Lætentur Cœli, or Lætantur Cæli, and occasionally referred to as the Act of Union or "Decree of Union".) (English: Let the Heavens Rejoice: Bull of Union with the Greeks) was a papal bull issued on 6 July 1439 by Pope Eugene IV at the Council of Ferrara-Florence. It officially reunited the Catholic Church with the Eastern Orthodox Church, temporarily ending the East–West Schism; however, it was repudiated by most eastern bishops shortly thereafter. The incipit of the bull (also used as its title) is derived from Psalms 95:11 in the Vulgate Bible (which corresponds to Psalm 96 in versions following the Hebrew numbering).

== Political background ==
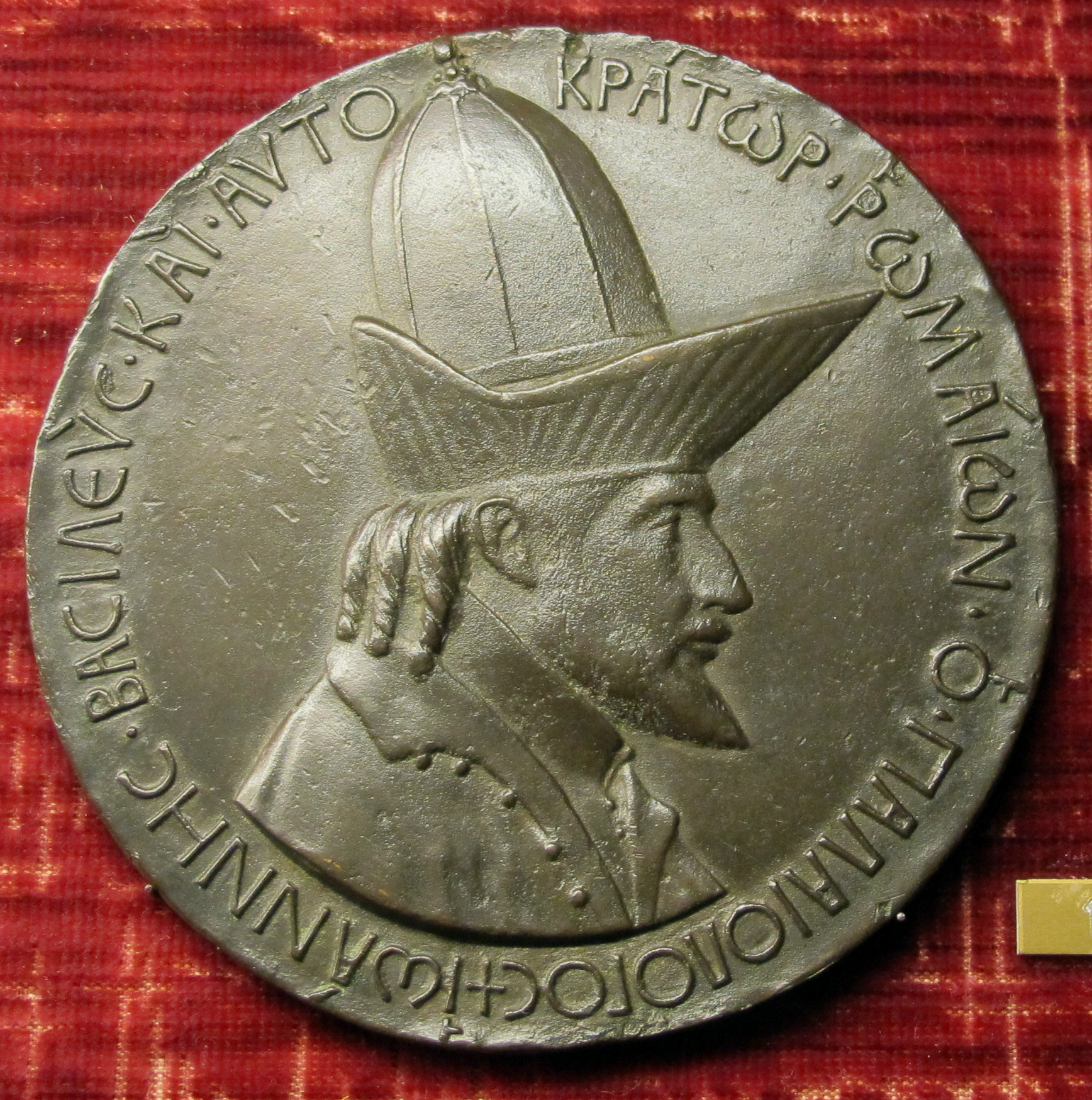
Medal of the Emperor John VIII Palaiologos during his visit to Florence, by Pisanello (1438). The legend reads, in Greek: "John the Palaiologos, basileus and autokrator of the Romans".

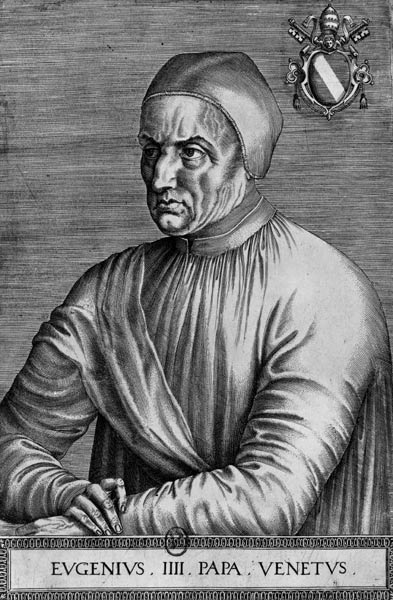
Portrait of Pope Eugenius IV, after Jean Fouquet.

In 1439 the Byzantine Empire was on the verge of collapse, retaining little more than the city of Constantinople, as the Ottoman Empire swept into Europe. During the reign of John V Palaiologos in the preceding century, the Byzantine Emperor had issued pleas to the West for aid in exchange for a union of the Roman Catholic and Greek Orthodox churches; the Papacy had been unmoved by these appeals, as had been King Louis I of Hungary. In 1369, after the fall of Adrianople to the Ottomans, John V had again issued a plea for help, hastening to Rome and publicly converting to Roman Catholicism. Help had not come, and John V was instead forced to become a vassal of Ottoman Sultan Murad I. A brief respite from Ottoman control later came as Timur pressured the Ottomans on the east, but by the 1420s Byzantine Emperor John VIII Palaiologos again acutely felt the need for assistance from the West. He again made the same plea his predecessor had, travelling with a delegation to the Council of Ferrara-Florence to reconcile with the Western Church. He consulted with Neoplatonist philosopher Gemistus Pletho, who advised him that the Roman Catholic and Eastern Orthodox delegations should have equal voting power at the Council; nonetheless, the Emperor was under far more pressure to bring about a union than was the Pope. In order to help the Russian Orthodox Church unite with the Western Church, John VIII appointed Isidore of Kiev as Metropolitan of Kiev in 1436 against the wishes of Vasily II of Moscow.

== Theological background ==
The Roman Catholic and Eastern Orthodox churches had developed several theological differences in the course of the East–West Schism of 1054 and the centuries following. The chief difference revolved around the insertion of the word Filioque (English: and the Son) into the Latin version of the Nicene Creed by the Roman Catholic Church, which Orthodox bishops had refused to accept. Thus, Eastern Orthodox dogma held that the Holy Spirit proceeded from God the Father, whereas Roman Catholic dogma held that it proceeded from both the Father and the Son. The Eastern bishops at the Council of Florence emphatically denied that even an ecumenical council had the power to add anything to the creed. A second central issue was that of Papal supremacy, which the Orthodox bishops had also rejected. Also important was the issue of the doctrine of Purgatory, which the Eastern churches similarly rejected, and the issue of leavening, wherein the Orthodox Churches used leavened bread for the Eucharist while the Roman Catholics used unleavened bread.

== Council of Florence and Laetentur Caeli ==
Laetentur caeli et exultet terra. Sublatus est enim de medio paries qui occidentalem orientalemque dividebat ecclesiam et pax atque concordia rediit, illo angulari lapide Christo qui fecit utraque unum, vinculo fortissimo caritatis et pacis utrumque iungente parietem et perpetue unitatis federe copulante ac continente; postque longam meroris nebulam et dissidii diuturni atram ingratamque caliginem, serenum omnibus unionis optate iubar illuxit.

— Pope Eugenius IV, Laetentur Caeli, opening sentences.

The 700 Eastern Orthodox delegates at the Council of Ferrara-Florence were maintained at the Pope's expense. Initially, Eastern Orthodox Patriarch Joseph II of Constantinople was in attendance, but when he died before the council ended, Emperor John VIII largely took Church matters into his own hands. To this end, he appointed the pro-union Metrophanes II of Constantinople as Joseph II's successor. In the summer of 1439 the council was moved from Ferrara to Florence because, at the instigation of Cosimo de' Medici, Florence offered to pay to maintain the Greek delegates, whom the Papacy was struggling to support.

Since the Roman Catholic West held all of the bargaining power given John VIII's desperate situation, the union of the churches was a simple matter for John: the Emperor ordered the Eastern representatives to accept the Western doctrines of the Filioque, Papal supremacy, and Purgatory, as Eugene IV asked. In return, Eugene pledged to provide military assistance for the defence of Constantinople and to encourage the King of Germany Albrecht II to war against the Ottomans. On 6 July 1439 the Emperor and all of the present bishops except one assented, signing their names to Eugene's Articles of Union. The day was proclaimed a public holiday in Florence, the Day of Union, and triumphal ceremonies were held. Eugene IV then officially proclaimed the union in the form of a bull, Laetentur Coeli. The bull was read from the pulpit of the Florence Cathedral by a Greek, Basilios Bessarion, and a Latin, Julian Cesarini.

Laetentur Caeli contained the first formal conciliar definition of Papal primacy. It has been suggested that Eugenius IV insisted on this because his primacy was at the time being threatened by a rival Antipope, Felix V, and the Conciliar Movement at the Council of Basel. The bull mentioned no differences between Eastern and Western understandings of the Papacy but rather simply restated the Western position. On the subject of the Filioque, it took a similar tone, emphasizing the commonalities between the theologies of the East and West but clearly siding with the Roman Catholic position without even mentioning Eastern Orthodox objections. On the subject of bread, the bull provided for either unleavened or leavened bread to be used according to local custom. The doctrine of Purgatory and the effectiveness of prayer for those in Purgatory were affirmed, again according to the Roman Catholic doctrine. Finally, the bull defined the order of primacy among the patriarchs of the pentarchy as being Rome, Constantinople, Alexandria, Antioch, and lastly Jerusalem.

The lone dissenting voice against the bull was that of Mark of Ephesus, delegate for the Patriarch of Alexandria, who refused to compromise on either the Filioque or Purgatory and held that Rome continued in heresy and schism. Reportedly, upon seeing that Mark's signature was missing, Eugene IV responded, “And so we have accomplished nothing.” Nonetheless the union was to proceed, and representatives from the Vatican would be sent to Constantinople to see how it was being carried out.

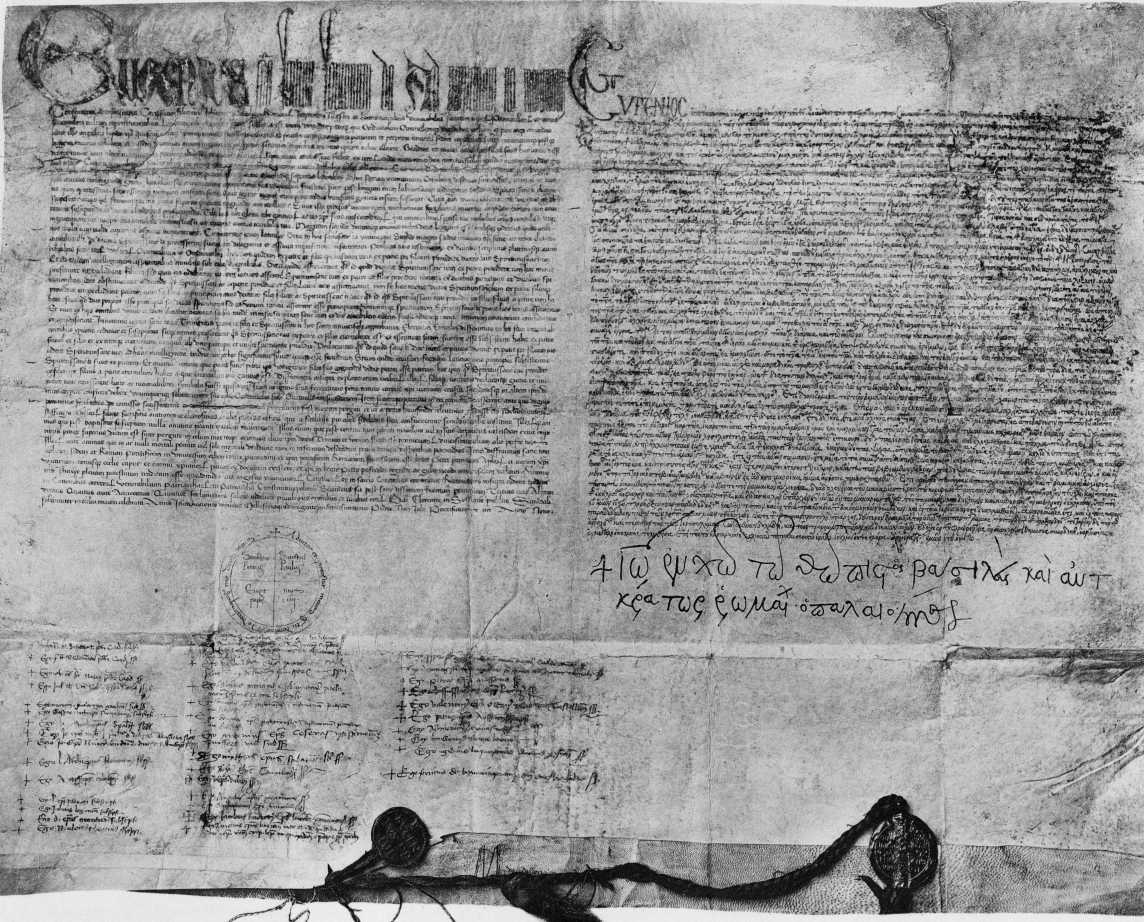
Image of the original text.

== Aftermath ==
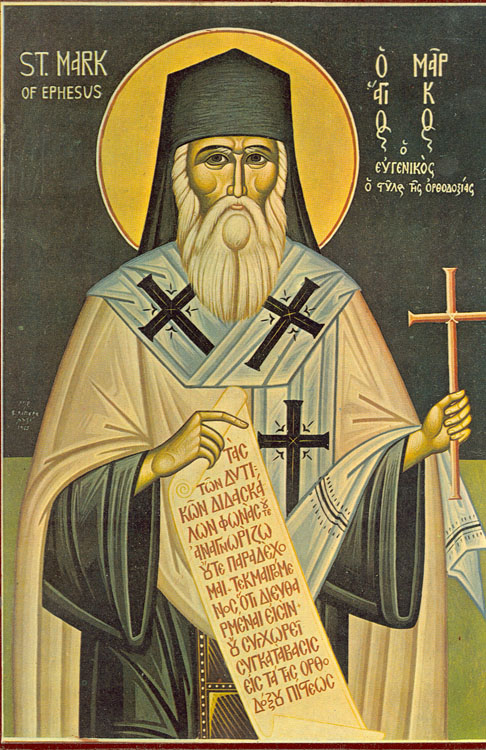
Fresco of Mark of Ephesus.

In the West, Pope Eugenius IV conducted further negotiations in an attempt to extend the union. He signed an agreement with the Armenians on 22 November 1439, and with a part of the Jacobites of Syria in 1443, and in 1445 he received some of the Nestorians and the Cypriot portion of the Maronites. These unions proved unstable and mostly failed to last. In the spring of 1442 the pope began planning a crusade by both land and sea against the Ottomans from Hungary and the Mediterranean to fulfil the Pope's pledges. These plans were initially slowed by a civil war in Hungary. On 1 January 1443, Eugene IV finally proclaimed an official crusade. Władysław III of Poland, now King of Hungary as well, agreed, but could not find support among his Polish nobles because they supported the Conciliar Movement against the Pope. Władysław nonetheless undertook the crusade with Hungarian troops and was killed in the Battle of Varna within a year, ending the attempt. Constantinople could no longer expect the West's military support.

In the East, John VIII, Mark of Ephesus, and the rest of the Eastern hierarchs returned to Constantinople on 1 February 1440. They soon found that the Byzantine people and the monks of Mount Athos, rallying around Mark, largely rejected the union. The newly Eastern Catholic bishops, in opposition to Mark, attested his resistance:

“Having returned to Constantinople, Ephesus disturbed and confused the Eastern Church by his writings and addresses directed against the decrees of the Council of Florence.”

Opinion among the bishops in Russia, contrary to those in Constantinople, remained with Mark, and by 1443 most Russian patriarchs repudiated the Council of Florence and the union of the churches. Thus Isidore of Kiev was arrested at the command of Vasily II upon his return to Moscow and convicted of apostasy, after which he was imprisoned; he then escaped and fled to Rome to become a cardinal. He returned to Constantinople in 1452 to celebrate the union but was forced to flee to Rome again as the city fell to the Ottomans. Meanwhile, in 1448, seeking to escape any unionist influence, the Russian Orthodox Church declared itself autocephalous.

The Venetian and Genoan governments ensured that no significant support from the West was forthcoming to Constantinople, supporting the Ottomans against the Byzantines. With the fall of Constantinople the last prospects of the union, too, fell. The new Ottoman rulers wanted to prevent the conquered Byzantines from appealing to the West, so Sultan Mehmed the Conqueror appointed the anti-union Gennadius Scholarius as Ecumenical Patriarch of Constantinople; he immediately renounced the Filioque and the Great Schism was renewed.
