= Patriarch Metrophanes of Constantinople =

Patriarch Metrophanes of Constantinople may refer to:

- Patriarch Metrophanes II of Constantinople, reigned from 1440 to 1443
- Patriarch Metrophanes III of Constantinople, reigned from 1565 to 1572 and from 1579 to 1580
