= Patriarch Euthymius of Constantinople =

Patriarch Euthymius of Constantinople may refer to:

- Euthymius I of Constantinople, Ecumenical Patriarch in 907–912
- Euthymius II of Constantinople, Ecumenical Patriarch in 1410–1416
