= Isidore of Kiev =

Byzantine Greek prelate (1385–1463)

His Eminence Isidore of Kiev
- Cardinal; Latin Patriarch of Constantinople
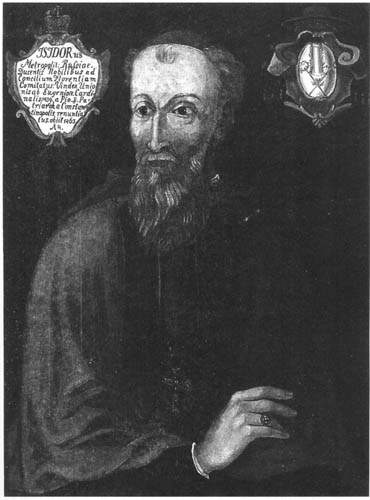
- Diocese: Constantinople
- Installed: 20 April 1458
- Term ended: 27 April 1463
- Predecessor: Gregory Mammas
- Successor: Basilios Bessarion
- Other post: Cardinal-bishop of Sabina
- Previous posts: Metropolitan of Kiev (1437–1458); Cardinal-Priest of Santi Marcellino e Pietro (1439–1451); Camerlengo of the Sacred College of Cardinals (1450); Dean of the College of Cardinals (1461–1463); Administrator of Nicosia (1458–1463)

Orders
- Consecration: 1437
- Created cardinal: 18 December 1439
- Rank: Cardinal bishop

Personal details
- Born: 1385 Monemvasia, Byzantine Greece, Byzantine Empire
- Died: 27 April 1463 (aged 77–78) Rome, Papal States
- Denomination: Eastern Catholic (formerly Eastern Orthodox)
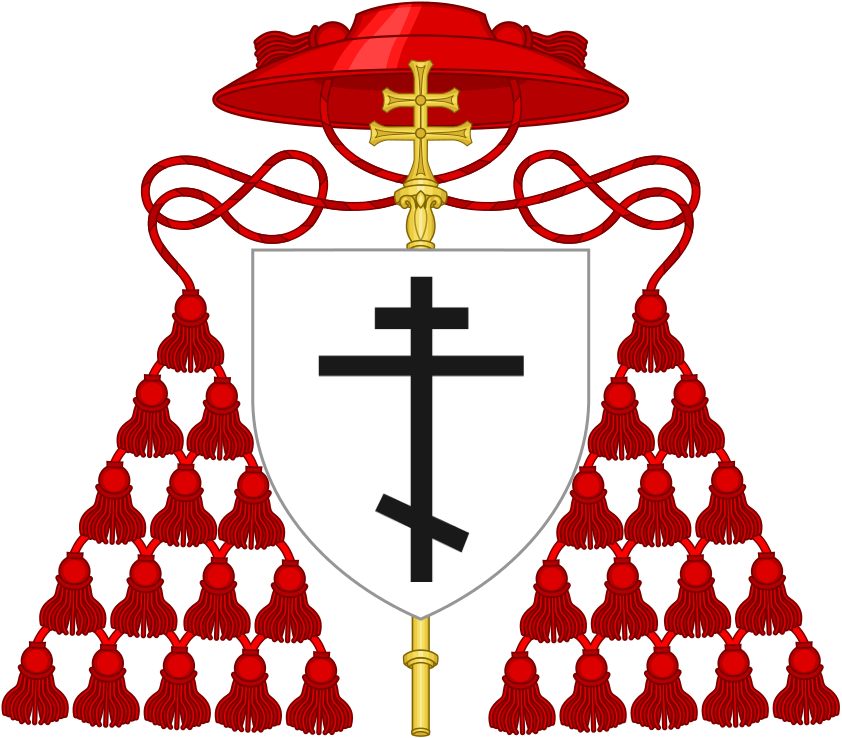
- Coat of arms: Isidore of Kiev's coat of arms

Styles of Isidore of Kiev
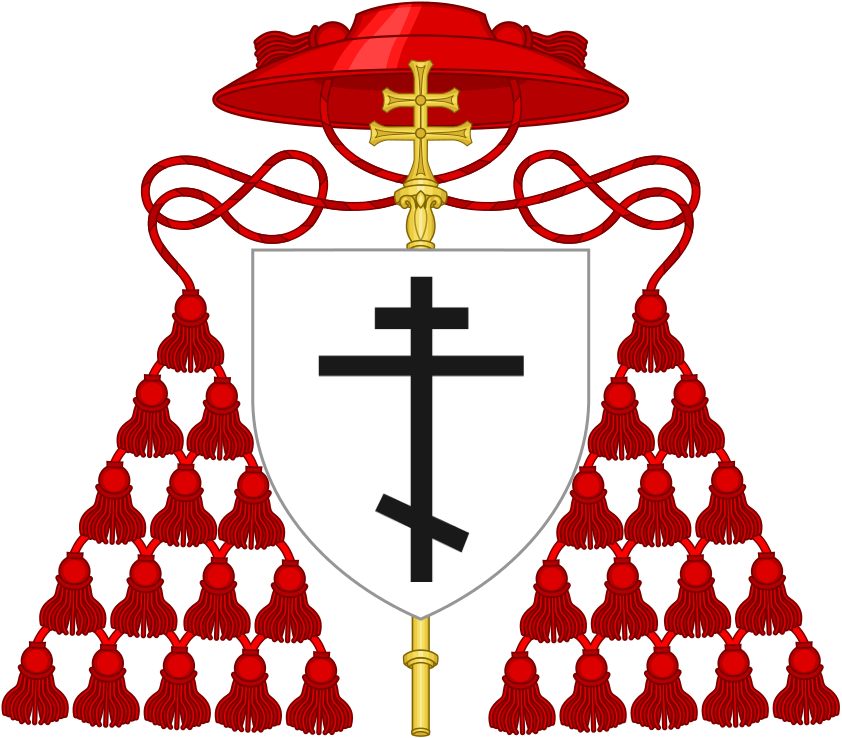
- Reference style: His Eminence
- Spoken style: Your Eminence
- Religious style: Cardinal
- Informal style: Cardinal
- See: Sabina e Poggio Mirteto (suburbicarian)

Isidore or Isidor of Kiev, (Note: Greek: Ἰσίδωρος τοῦ Κιέβου, romanized: Isídōros tou Kiévou; Latin: Isidorus Kioviensis; Russian: Исидор Киевский, romanized: Isidor Kievsky; Ukrainian: Ісидор Київський, romanized: Isydor Kyivs'kyy) also known as Isidore of Thessalonica (1385 – 27 April 1463), was a prelate of Byzantine Greek origin. From 1437 to 1441, he served as the metropolitan of Kiev and all Rus', based in Moscow, after being chosen by Joseph II of Constantinople.

As a supporter of the union with Rome, he left Moscow to attend the Council of Ferrara–Florence. On his return in 1441, he was imprisoned but allowed to escape later that year. A council of Russian bishops chose their own metropolitan in 1448, which amounted to a declaration of autocephaly by the Russian Orthodox Church. However, Isidore continued to be recognized by Constantinople as metropolitan until 1458, when Gregory the Bulgarian was made the first metropolitan of the Uniate church.

Isidore was later dispatched to Constantinople and he proclaimed the union of the Greek and Latin churches at the Hagia Sophia on 12 December 1452. Following the fall of Constantinople, he returned to Rome. In the Latin Church, Isidore was the cardinal bishop of Sabina, Archbishop of Cyprus, Camerlengo of the Sacred College of Cardinals and the Latin Patriarch of Constantinople.

== Early life ==
Early views on his birthplace suggest that he was born in Constantinople, Thessaloniki, or possibly Dalmatia. According to one version popular with modern scholars who stress his links to Constantinople, Isidore was born c. 1385 or possibly c. 1390 in Monemvasia or somewhere else in the Morea. He may have been a born into a noble family, but it is only known that he was well-connected and had the patronage of the Palaiologos dynasty.

His youth is also poorly documented, but it is likely that most of his education was at Constantinople. Based on his literary interests, Isidore received training in the scriptures, the Church Fathers, and the laws of the different dioceses and ecclesiastical jurisdictions. As a result, he would have had extensive training in ancient Greek, specifically in the Attic dialect. In Constantinople, he studied in the company of Italian humanists, including Guarino da Verona. The earliest work associated with Isidore is the funeral oration composed by Emperor Manuel II for his brother, Theodore I Palaiologos. Isidore later composed a speech commemorating the emperors Manuiel II and John VIII.

From 1420 to 1430, Isidore was in the Morea, during the time an offensive was launched by John VIII and his brothers against local Latin lords, including Carlo I Tocco. A sea engagement between the Byzantines and Tocco is known from Isidore's Panegyric. Some historians have speculated that he was attached to the headquarters of the brothers in some capacity during this time and he returned to Constantinople shortly afterward, or that he returned with John VIII to the Constantinople in 1428. A manuscripts suggests that he did not stay in Constantinople for long and embarked on another journey to the Morea, but his ship was blown off course and reached Sicily instead.

It was the time when the Court of Constantinople, on the eve of its final destruction by the Ottoman Empire, was considering the chance of rescue from the Western princes as a result of reuniting with Rome. In 1434, Isidore was sent to Basel by John VIII Palaiologos (1425–1448) as part of an embassy to open negotiations with the Council of Basel. Here he made a speech about the splendour of the Roman Empire at Constantinople, but his efforts did not result in union of the churches.

== Metropolitan of Kiev ==
=== Arrival in Moscow ===
In 1432, a council of Russian bishops chose Jonah, the bishop of Ryazan and Murom, to succeed Photius as metropolitan. By 1433, Jonah had already styled himself as the metropolitan designate. However, there was a delay in sending Jonah as Grand Prince Vasily II of Moscow did not regain the throne until 1434. Jonah was dispatched to Constantinople at the end of 1435 or the beginning of 1436. However, by the time of his arrival, Joseph II, the patriarch of Constantinople, had already chosen Isidore as metropolitan.

According to a letter written by Jonah, it was decreed by the Patriarch "and the divine and holy council" that "when Isidor either by God’s will dies, or should anything else happen to him", then Jonah was to be "metropolitan in Russia". Vasily II wrote to the Emperor: "What shall we then do? You did not come to us in time and we appointed another to that most holy metropolitan see and we cannot now do otherwise. Isidor is already metropolitan in Russia, and you, [Jonah], go back to your see, the bishopric of Ryzan. And should God's will preordain that Isidor dies, or should anything else happen to him, then you, Iona, shall be metropolitan in Russia after him." Isidore arrived in the metropolitan seat of Moscow in April 1437 and was accompanied by Jonah.

From the Byzantine point of view, Isidore was ideal based on his education, diplomatic skills and command of languages. Isidore's participation in the Council of Basel in particular gave him experience in the interchange of interdoctrinal arguments. Simeon of Suzdal, who had accompanied him, wrote that "the Greeks thought him to be more than all the others a great metropolitan and philosopher". When Isidore first arrived in Russia, nobody suspected him of being a supporter of the union of Rome. Vasily II was unwilling to accept Isidore at first, but this was only due to Jonah having been overlooked in Constantinople.

Russian chronicles say that Vasily II tried everything to prevent him from going to "the eighth Latin Council and not to be led astray by their [i.e. the Latins'] heresy", while Jonah also claimed that "however much my lord and son, Grand Prince Vasily, urged him not to go, he was unable to stop him". However, the accounts of Jonah and the chroniclers were written only after Isidore's "betrayal of Orthodoxy". It is also possible that Vasily II requested Isidore to delay his departure to deal with the backlog of ecclesiastical business.

On 8 September 1437, after promising Vasily II that he would "strengthen the faith and unite the Church in Orthodoxy", Isidore left Moscow with his retinue numbering one hundred. His retinue included one bishop, Avraamy of Suzdal, and a number of clerics. Avraamy also brought along the monk Simeon, who wrote his polemical Tale of the Council of Florence, as well as other scribes, one of whom was likely the anonymous author of the Journey to the Council of Florence, which was the earliest known Russian description of Western Europe. There were three staging posts in Russia: Tver, Novgorod and Pskov. Afterwards, Isidore spent eight weeks in Riga. Finally, he arrived at Ferrara on 18 August 1438. He found that the Patriarch and Emperor had been waiting for the Russian delegation since March, while the Western princes never came.

=== Council of Florence ===
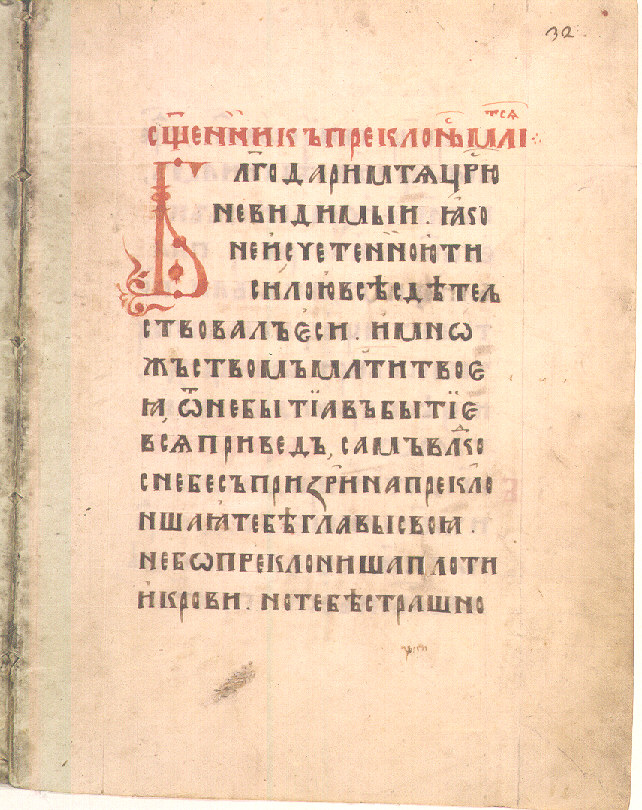
Isidore's Sluzebnik liturgical book

On 5 July 1439, at the Council of Florence, all the Greeks headed by the Emperor, except for Mark of Ephesus, signed the Decree of Union. The only Russian prelate present, Avraamy of Suzdal, signed the union, but, according to Simeon of Suzdal, this was only under duress. In his Tale of the Council of Florence, Simeon says that Avraamy "did not wish [to sign], but Metropolitan Isidor arrested him and gaoled him for a whole week. Then he signed under constraint." Isidore was made cardinal and apostolic delegate "in the Province of Lithuania, Livonia and Russia and in the states, dioceses, territories and places of Lechia [Poland] which are regarded as subject to you in your right as metropolitan".

Isidore left Florence on 6 September 1439 and his journey to Moscow took nearly twice as long as his journey to Ferrara. Simeon of Suzdal and the envoy of the prince of Tver, having fallen foul of Isidore, fled from Venice in December 1439. The envoy presumably reached Tver in early 1440, after which the news of the union would have reached Moscow. In addition, the author of the Journey to the Council of Florence left Isidore's retinue in August 1440 and arrived in Russia the following month. As a result, Isidore may have been apprehensive of his reception there. From 15 September to 27 December 1439, Isidore was in Venice, before heading to Buda, where he issued an encyclical "to the Polish, Lithuanian and German [i.e. Teutonic Knights'] lands and to all Orthodox Christian Russia" in March 1440. After a brief stay in Poland, Isidore spent the first half of the summer in Galicia. By mid-August, he reached Vilnius and he spent the next six months in Lithuania. Following this, he visited Kiev and then Smolensk, where he took Simeon as prisoner.

=== Return to Moscow ===
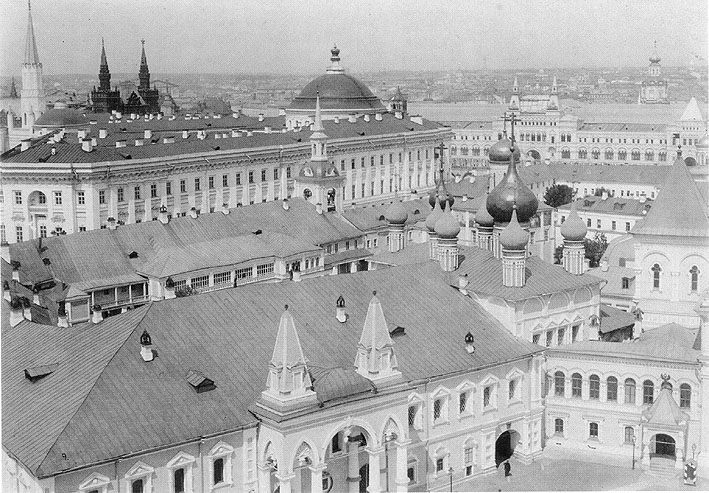
The Moscow Chudov Monastery in 1883

Isidore arrived in Moscow on 19 March 1441. The chronicle says: "With great pride, falsehood and Latin arrogance he [had] carried before him a Latin crucifix and a silver crozier. ... Should anyone not bow down before the crucifix he ordered them to be beaten with the crozier, as is done in the presence of the pope." It then says: "The metropolitan entered the holy cathedral church of [the Dormition of] the Mother of God and served the holy Liturgy, commemorating in the first place Pope Eugene without mentioning the Orthodox patriarchs." The Grand Prince of Moscow was given a letter from the Pope stating "the Eastern Church is now one with us" and giving much of the credit to "our most holy brother Isidor, your metropolitan ... of all Russia and legate from the Apostolic Throne. ... We ask you in piety to receive this Metropolitan Isidor for his justice and for the good of the Church".

According to Simeon, "realizing the delusion of the metropolitan", the Grand Prince ordered Isidore to be "cast out from his spiritual rank" and, "for such soul-destroying heresy, to be expelled from the town of Moscow and from all his land". The chronicles say that three days later, Isidore was arrested and placed under supervision in the Chudov Monastery. The chroniclers of the Grand Prince wrote in their account that "the princes, the boyars and many others—and especially the Russian bishops—remained silent, slumbered and fell asleep," and it was not until "the divinely wise, Christ-loving sovereign, Grand Prince Vasily Vasilyevich ... shamed Isidor and called him not his pastor and teacher, but a wicked and baneful wolf" did "all the bishops of Russia who were then in Moscow wake up, and the princes and boyars and grandees and the multitude of Christians come to their senses ... and begin to call Isidor a heretic". According to John L. I. Fennell: "Clearly Simeon and the chroniclers distorted facts in their depiction of Isidor's reception in Moscow, colouring their accounts according to their prejudices." Fennell noted that between 19 March and 15 September 1441, when Isidore left Moscow, he was at some time recognized by Vasily II as the lawful metropolitan.

The Nikon Chronicle and grand princely codex of 1479 both agree that on 15 September 1441, Isidor escaped with two of his disciples, Gregory and Afanasy. Isidore fled to Tver, where he was placed under house arrest by Boris of Tver, according to the chronicles of Pskov. Afterwards, he reached Novogrudok and then Rome. The grand princely codex of 1479 describes Isidore's "secret escape by night like a thief" and mentions that "Grand Prince Vasily Vasil'evich sent no one to bring him back, nor did he have any desire to hold him back". Vasily II wrote a letter to Patriarch Metrophanes II, which was never sent, requesting for a Russian candidate to be appointed as metropolitan. The letter mentions Isidore's return to Moscow, calling himself Legatus a latere and carrying before him "a Latin sculptured crucifix with [Christ's] two feet nailed with one nail", but not his imprisonment or escape. It also says Isidore "commemorated the pope" and "subjected us to the Roman Church and the Roman pope". The only action by Vasily it mentions is that he summoned a synod of six bishops, who concluded that "all Isidor's business ... is alien and different from the divine and holy canons". As a result, a decision was made to send envoys to Constantinople in order to request the appointment of a Russian metropolitan by "the God-loving bishops of our fatherland". Vasily II returned to power in February 1447 following a flare-up in the civil war and Jonah was finally appointed as metropolitan on 15 December 1448 by a council of Russian bishops. In 1458, Gregory the Bulgarian was chosen by the uniate patriarch of Constantinople as the new metropolitan of Kiev, but his legitimacy was rejected in Moscow.

According to the hypothesis proposed by the Russian historian William Pokhlyobkin, it may have been Isidore who produced the first genuine recipe of Russian vodka while being detained in the Chudov Monastery. Subsequent writers have criticized Pokhlyobkin's work, while some Russian historians have designated the birthdate of Russian vodka as early as the 13th century.

== Later life ==
Before the fall of Constantinople in 1453, he subsidized the repair of fortifications at his own expense and was wounded in the early hours of the sack. He escaped the carnage by dressing up a dead body in his cardinal's robes. While the Turks were cutting off its head and parading it through the streets, the real cardinal was shipped off to Asia Minor with a number of other prisoners as a slave, and later found safety in Crete. He composed a series of letters describing the events of the siege. He warned of the danger of further expansion of the Turks in the multiple letters and even seems to be the earliest eyewitness to have compared Mehmed II with Alexander the Great.

He made his way back to Rome in 1455, and was made Bishop of Sabina, presumably adopting the Latin Rite. Pope Pius II (1458–1464) later gave him two titles successively; Latin Patriarch of Constantinople and Archbishop of Cyprus, neither of which he could convert into real jurisdiction. He was Dean of the Sacred College of Cardinals from October 1461. He died on 27 April 1463.

== See also ==
- Greek scholars in the Renaissance

== Sources ==
- Fennell, John (14 January 2014). A History of the Russian Church to 1488. Routledge. ISBN 978-1-317-89720-0.
- Kent, Neil (2021). A Concise History of the Russian Orthodox Church. Academica Press. ISBN 978-1-68053-907-3.
- Gavrilkin, Konstantin (3 February 2014). McGuckin, John Anthony (ed.). The Concise Encyclopedia of Orthodox Christianity. John Wiley & Sons. pp. 401–411. ISBN 978-1-118-75933-2.
- Philippides, Marios; Hanak, Walter K. (9 April 2018). Cardinal Isidore (c.1390–1462): A Late Byzantine Scholar, Warlord, and Prelate. Routledge. ISBN 978-1-351-21488-9.

Eastern Orthodox Church titles
Preceded by Gerasimus of Kiev	Metropolitan of Kiev and all Rus' (episcopal seat in Moscow); 1437–1441	Succeeded by Gregory the Bulgarian as Metropolitan of Kiev, Galicia and all Rus'; Recognised by Constantinople
Preceded by Gerasimus of Kiev	Metropolitan of Kiev and all Rus' (episcopal seat in Moscow); 1437–1441	Succeeded by Jonah of Moscow as Metropolitan of Moscow and all Rus' 1448; Not recognised by Constantinople
Catholic Church titles
Preceded by Astorgio Agnensi	Camerlengo of the Sacred College of Cardinals; 1450–1463	Succeeded by Latino Orsini
Preceded by Andrea di Costantinopoli	Apostolic Administrator of Nicosia; 1456–1463	Succeeded by Nicola Guglielmo Goner
Preceded by Gregory Mammas	— TITULAR — Latin Patriarch of Constantinople; 1458–1463	Succeeded by Johannes Bessarion
