= Patriarch Callistus of Constantinople =

Patriarch Callistus of Constantinople may refer to:

- Callistus I of Constantinople, Ecumenical Patriarch in 1350–1354 and 1355–1363
- Callistus II of Constantinople, Ecumenical Patriarch in 1397
