= Metropolis of Kiev, Galicia and all Rus' =

Metropolis of Kiev, Galicia and all Rus' may refer to:

- Metropolis of Kiev, Galicia and all Rus' (1441–1596)
- Metropolis of Kiev, Galicia and all Rus' (1620–1686)
- Metropolis of Kiev, Galicia and all Ruthenia (Ruthenian Uniate Church)

== See also ==
- Metropolis of Kiev and all Rus'
