= Metropolis of Kiev, Galicia and all Rus' (1441–1596) =

Episcopal see in Constantinople

The Metropolis of Kiev, Galicia and all Rus' was a metropolis of the Ecumenical Patriarchate of Constantinople in the Eastern Orthodox Church that was erected in 1441. (Note: The title is also known as the Metropolis of Kiev, Halych and all Rus' or Metropolis of Kyiv, Halychyna, and All-Rus'. The name "Galicia" is a Latinized form of Halych, one of several regional principalities of the medieval state of Kievan Rus'.) The canonical territory was the western part of the traditional Kievan Rus' lands — the states of the Grand Duchy of Lithuania and the Kingdom of Poland. The episcopal seat was initially in the city of Navahrudak, which is today located in Belarus; later it moved to Vilnius in Lithuania. It was disestablished in 1595/6 with the creation of a new ecclesial body — the Ruthenian Uniate Church.

== Background ==
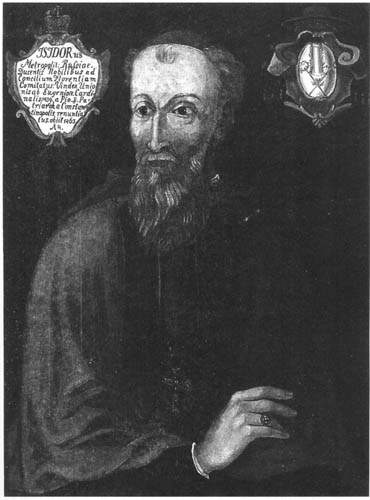
Isidore of Kiev

An Ecumenical council of the Church—the Council of Florence—took place from 1431 to 1449. (Note: Valois, 1911, pg463) Although he resisted at first, the Grand Prince of Moscow (Note: The Grand Duchy of Moscow was a predecessor state of current state called the Russian Federation. (Sources: Russia: People and Empire, 1552–1917 by Geoffrey Hosking, Harvard University Press, 1998, ISBN 0674781198 (page 46) & Russia and The Commonwealth of Independent States 2012 by M. Wesley Shoemaker, Stryker Post, 2012, ISBN 1610488938 (page 10).))—Vasily II of Moscow—eventually permitted the Metropolitan of Kiev and all Rus'—Isidore of Kiev—to attend the council on condition that Isidore should return with "the rights of Divine law and the constitution of the holy Church" uninjured. The council healed the Great Schism by uniting the Roman Catholic and Eastern Orthodox churches. The union was proclaimed on 6 July 1439 in the document Laetentur Caeli (Note: Sometimes also spelled as Laetentur Coeli, Laetantur Caeli, Lætentur Cæli, Lætentur Cœli, or Lætantur Cæli, and occasionally referred to as the Act of Union or "Decree of Union".) which was composed by Pope Eugene IV and signed by the Holy Roman Emperor Sigismund and all but one of the bishops present. (Note: Valois, 1911, pg463) Some Greek bishops, perhaps feeling political pressure from the Byzantine Emperor, reluctantly accepted the decrees of the council. Other Eastern bishops, such as Isidore, did so with sincere conviction. Sylvester Syropoulos and other Greek writers charge Isidore with perjury because he accepted the union, despite his promise to Vasili II.

Following the signing of the bull, Isidore returned to the Grand Duchy of Moscow. In the Kremlin's Dormition Cathedral, Isidore read the decree of unification aloud. He also passed a message to Vasili II from the Holy See, containing a request to assist the metropolitan in spreading the Union in Rus'. Three days later, Isidore was arrested by the Grand Prince and imprisoned in the Chudov Monastery. He arranged for certain Rus' clergy to denounce the metropolitan for refusing to renounce the union with Rome. As a result, the Great Prince of Moscow voided the union in his lands and imprisoned Isidore for some time. Having adjudged Isidore to have apostatized to Catholicism, he was deposed by a local synod.

After the metropolitan throne lay vacant for seven years, the secular authorities replaced him with Jonah of Moscow. Like his immediate predecessors, he permanently resided in Moscow, and was the last Moscow-based primate of the metropolis to keep the traditional title with reference to the metropolitan city of Kiev. He was also the first metropolitan in Moscow to be appointed without the approval of the Ecumenical Patriarch of Constantinople as had been the norm. This signified the beginning of the de facto independence (autocephaly) of the Moscow (north-eastern) part of the Church.

The struggle for ecumenical union at Ferrara and Florence, while promising, never bore fruit. While progress toward union in the East continued to be made in the following decades, all hopes for a proximate reconciliation were dashed with the fall of Constantinople in 1453. Following their conquest, the Ottomans encouraged hardline anti-unionist Orthodox clerics in order to divide European Christians.

== Establishment ==
Religious denominations in the Commonwealth in 1573

The Polish–Lithuanian rulers rejected Jonah and continued to recognise Isidore as metropolitan. Jonah was unable to exercise any pastoral control beyond the borders of Muscovy. In 1458, while Isidore was still alive, his nephew Gregory the Bulgarian was appointed to succeed him as the Metropolitan of Kiev, Galicia and all Rus' by Patriarch Gregory III of Constantinople with the agreement of Pope Pius II. Gregory III was an exile in Rome from Constantinople at the time. In 1469, Patriarch Dionysius I of Constantinople also gave his blessing to Gregory's appointment. The election of Gregory the Bulgarian was also supported by most diocesan bishops of the original Metropolis of Kiev and all Rus', among which were bishops of Przemysl, Chelm, Halych, Turow, Volodymyr, Lutsk, Polotsk, and Smolensk, while against were at least two metropolitan bishops in Moscow and Chernigov. At least two more diocesan bishops of Veliky Novgorod and Tver chose to abstain in choosing either side. After 1461, the Muscovite clergy abandoned the "Kiev" title and took on the new title of "Metropolitan of Moscow and all Rus'". (Note: "... the metropolitan in Kiev bore the title "metropolitan of Kiev and All Rus’," never "metropolitan of the Rus’ Land," just as the metropolitan of Moscow bore the title "metropolitan of Moscow and All Rus’," not "metropolitan of the Rus’ Land."") The metropolis remained in communion with the Holy See throughout Gregory's reign as well as during the rule of his successor—Міsail (1476–1480).

== Ecclesiastical structure ==
This is a list of bishops who supported the new metropolitan:

- Przemysl
- Chelm
- Halych
- Turow
- Volodymyr
- Lutsk
- Polotsk
- Smolensk

There were two bishops—in Moscow and Chernigov—who did not support him. At least two more diocesan bishops of Great Novgorod and Tver chose to abstain in selection either side. (Note: Beside dioceses that are mentioned, there also existed Rostov, Suz[h]dal, Saray, Kolomna, and Great Perm dioceses status of which on the subject is not certain.)

== List of metropolitans ==
- Gregory (1458–1473)
- Spyridon (1476–1482)
  - Misail (1474–1480)
- Simeon (1481–1488)
- Jonah Hlezna (1488–1494)
- Macarius I (1495–1497), appears to have been the first metropolitan to reside in Vilnius (in modern Lithuania) rather than in Navahrudak (in modern Belarus)
- Joseph the Bulgarian (1498–?)
- Jonah II
- Joseph II
- Joseph III
- Macarius II
- Sylvester
- Jonah III
- Elias
- Onesiphorus
- Michael (1588–1599)

== Disestablishment ==
In 1569, the Polish–Lithuanian Commonwealth was established. The Warsaw Confederation of 1573 secured the rights of minorities and religions; it allowed all persons to practice any faith freely. However, in the eastern territories, the aristocracy was mainly Polish and they carried out a policy of Polonization of their peasants, the majority of whom were neither Polish nor Catholic. At the same time, colonization of the eastern territories (nowadays roughly western and central Ukraine), heightened tensions among nobles, Jews, Cossacks (traditionally Orthodox), Polish and Ruthenian peasants.

In 1589, Patriarch Jeremias II of Constantinople visited the Polish–Lithuanian Commonwealth. In agreement with King Sigismund III Vasa, he deposed the Metropolitan Onesiphorus Devochka, probably because he was a digamy (the second marriage for priests) and he tolerated this use. King Sigismund put forward Michel Rohoza as his candidate for the metropolis. In August 1589 at Vilnius, Jeremias consecrated Michael as Metropolitan of Kiev, Galicia and all Rus'.

As metropolitan, he started to reform the Church. He wished to improve the mores of the clergy and to reduce of the meddling of lay people (and of confraternities) in the life of the Church and in monasteries. To this end, he summoned a synod in 1590. His attempts of reform were opposed by the stauropegics. Since it proved difficult to carry on the reforms, he began to look to Rome. In 1595/6, Metropolitan Rohoza with all his suffragan bishops, subscribed to the Union of Brest. This transferred their ecclesiastical jurisdiction from the Ecumenical Patriarchate of Constantinople to the jurisdiction of the Holy See on condition that this union of faith would preserve the Byzantine rite, the liturgical practices and the canon law of the metropolis. This effectively disestablished the metropolis within the Eastern Orthodox Church while establishing it as a sui juris particular church—the Ruthenian Uniate Church—within the Catholic Church.

== See also ==
- Metropolis of Kiev, Galicia and all Rus' (1620–1686) which re-established the metrolpolis under the jurisdiction of the Ecumenical patriarchate in the territory of the Polish–Lithuanian Commonwealth.
