= Gregory the Bulgarian =

Metropolitan of Kiev, Galicia and all Ruthenia (1458–1474)

Gregory the Bulgarian, or Gregory II (fl. 1458 – d. 1474) was Metropolitan of Kiev, Galicia and all Rus'. (Note: The title is also known as the Metropolis of Kiev, Halych and all Rus' or Metropolis of Kyiv, Halychyna, and All-Rus'. The name "Galicia" is a Latinized form of Halych, one of several regional principalities of the medieval state of Kievan Rus'.) His title to the metropolitan see was acknowledged both by the Holy See and by the Ecumenical Patriarchate of Constantinople due to their joint acceptance of the Council of Florence which united the Latin and the Eastern Orthodox Churches for a short period of time.

He was consecrated by the Patriarch of Constantinople—Gregory III—in 1458. His canonical territory was the western part of the traditional Kievan Rus' lands—the states of the Grand Duchy of Lithuania and the Kingdom of Poland. The episcopal seat was in the city of Navahrudak which is today located in Belarus.

== Early life ==
Gregory was born in Ottoman Bulgaria. He was a nephew of the Metropolitan of Kiev and all Rus'—Isidore of Kiev. He acted as Isidore's aide the Council of Florence in 1439.

== Career ==
In 1448, Russian bishops in Moscow, who had rejected the Union with Rome, elected Jonah as Metropolitan of Kiev and all Rus' without the consent of Constantinople. The Polish-Lithuanian rulers rejected Jonah. After 1461, the Muscovite clergy abandoned the "Kiev" title and took on the new title of "Metropolitan of Moscow and all Rus'". (Note: "... the metropolitan in Kiev bore the title "metropolitan of Kiev and All Rus’," never "metropolitan of the Rus’ Land," just as the metropolitan of Moscow bore the title "metropolitan of Moscow and All Rus’," not "metropolitan of the Rus’ Land."")

In 1458, Gregory was appointed as the Metropolitan of Kiev, Halych and all Rus by Patriarch Gregory III of Constantinople with the agreement of Pope Pius II. Gregory III was an exile in Rome from Constantinople at the time. The Pope also appointed him as the Latin Patriarch of Constantinople although some uniates continued to regard him as the Ecumenical Patriarch. The election of Gregory the Bulgarian was also supported by most diocesan bishops of the original Old Russian Church among which were bishops of Przemysl, Chelm, Halych, Turow, Volodymyr, Lutsk, Polotsk, and Smolensk, while against were at least two metropolitan bishop in Moscow and Chernigov. At least two more diocesan bishops of Great Novgorod and Tver chose to abstain in selection either side. (Note: Beside dioceses that are mentioned, there also existed Rostov, Suz[h]dal, Saray, Kolomna, and Great Perm dioceses status of which on the subject is not certain.)

In 1467, Patriarch Dionysius I also gave his blessing to Gregory's appointment. In 1470, Gregory returned from the union.

The metropolis within the Polish kingdom and the Grand Duchy of Lithuania remained therefore in communion with the Holy See, as well as during the rule of the following metropolitan Міsail (1476–1480).

Later, during signing of the Union of Brest, the appointment of Gregory was mentioned by Michael Rohoza.

== Notes ==
Preceded by New creation	Metropolis of Kiev, Galicia and all Rus'; 1458–1473	Succeeded by Misail Pstruch
