= Spiridon Sobol =

Belarusian printer

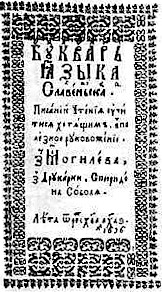
Titlepage of Sobol's Bukvar (alphabet book), 1636

Spiridon Sobol (Belarusian: Спірыдо́н Міро́навіч Со́баль, Russian: Спиридо́н Миро́нович Со́боль) (1580—1590, Mogilev − 1645, Muntenia) was a Belarusian printer and educator. Sobol was the first East Slavic printer to use copper etching (for the title page of Octoechos, 1628). His name is associated with the printing house in Kuciejna, near Orsha, which he founded in 1630.

== Biography ==
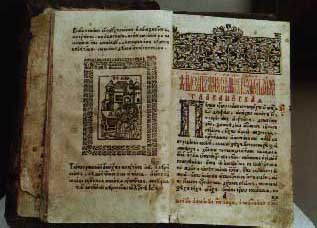
Kniga Apostol, 1632

Spiridon Sobol was born in the city of Mogilyov (now Belarus). He knew Greek and Latin languages and taught in a brotherhood school in Kiev. Sobol printed books in Mogilyov, Kiev (where he was supported by metropolitan Job Boretsky), Kutejno, Bujnichi, and in present day Romania. He published more than 20 editions, including an early «bukvar» (alphabet book). Late in life he became a monk in the Kiev-Pechersk Lavra. Sobol's Octoechos (1628) became the first illustrated Cyrillic book to employ the technique of copper engraving.

== See also ==
- Symon Budny
- Ivan Fedorov
- Johann Gutenberg
- Francysk Skaryna
- Spread of the printing press

== Sources ==
- Зернова А. С. Белорус, печатник С. Соболь // Книга: Исслед.и материалы. 1965. Сб.10;
- Исаевич Я. Д. Преемники первопечатника. М., 1981.
