= Matthew I of Constantinople =

Ecumenical Patriarch of Constantinople from 1397 to 1402 and from 1403 to 1410

- Ecumenical Patriarch of Constantinople
- Church: Church of Constantinople
- In office: October 1397 – Autumn 1402; 14 June 1403 – 10 August 1410
- Predecessor: Callistus II of Constantinople
- Successor: Euthymius II of Constantinople

Personal details
- Died: 10 August 1410
- Denomination: Eastern Orthodoxy

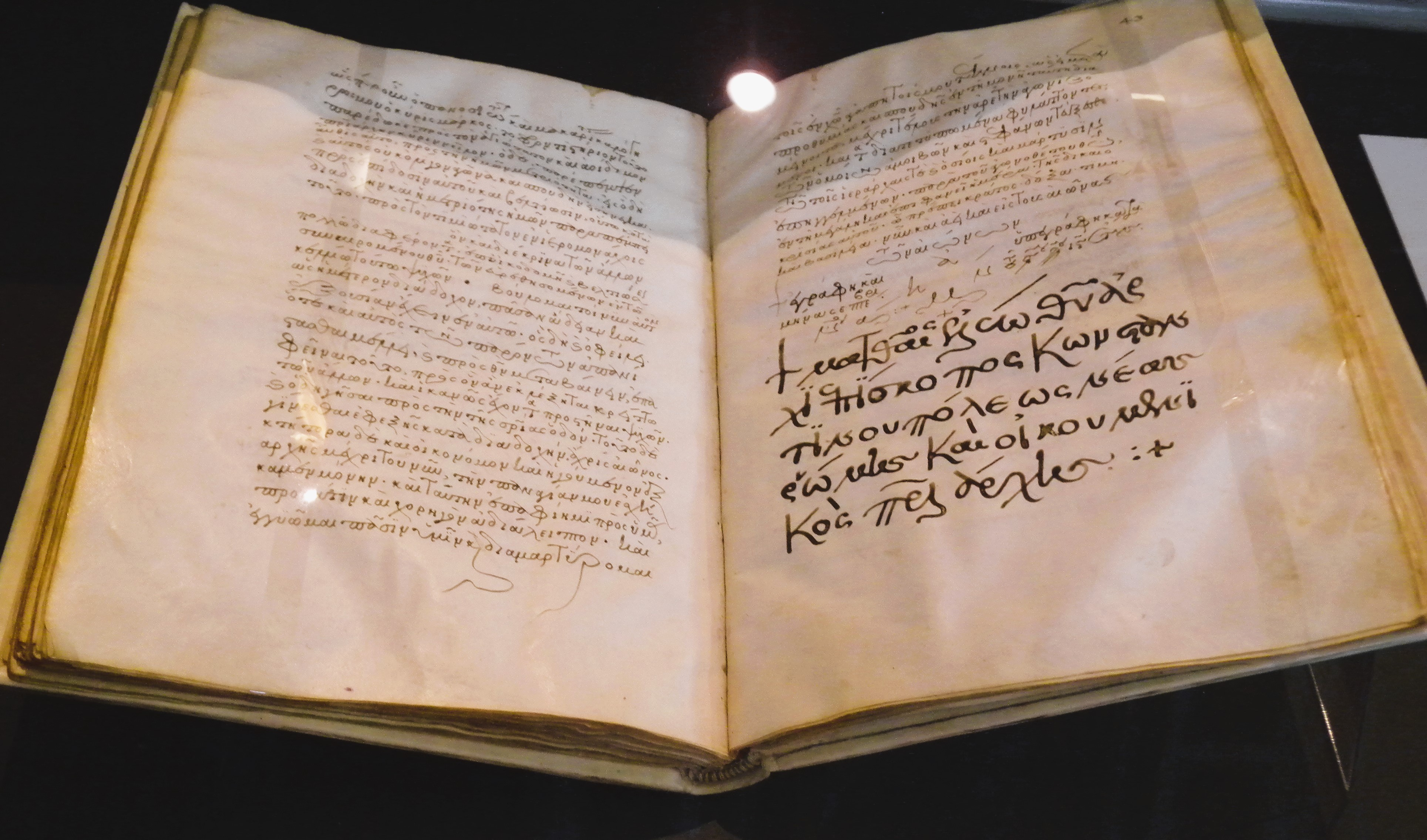
Patriarch Matthew I's testament, 1407 (Austrian National Library).

Matthew I of Constantinople (Greek: Ματθαῖος; died 10 August 1410) was the Ecumenical Patriarch of Constantinople from 1397 to 1410, with a brief interruption in 1402–1403.

Matthew entered a monastery as a fifteen-year-old. He is known to have been a monk of the Charsianites Monastery at Constantinople by 1380, when he was ordained a deacon, eventually becoming its abbot in 1388. Matthew was a pupil of Mark, the abbot of the Kosmidion Monastery at Constantinople, and of Patriarch Nilus of Constantinople. In 1387, during the latter's patriarchate, Matthew was elected Bishop of Cyzicus, but was apparently not consecrated. He concurrently served as locum tenens (proedros) of the Metropolis of Chalcedon until April 1389.

Through the support of Emperor Manuel II Palaiologos, he became Patriarch of Constantinople in October 1397 but soon encountered the opposition of the metropolitans Macarius of Ancyra, Matthew of Medea, and John Holobolos, who succeeded in deposing him during Manuel II's absence in the West, in autumn 1402. On the emperor's return, Matthew was re-appointed (14 June 1403) and held the post until his death in August 1410.

== Bibliography ==
- Trapp, Erich; Beyer, Hans-Veit; Walther, Rainer; Sturm-Schnabl, Katja; Kislinger, Ewald; Leontiadis, Ioannis; Kaplaneres, Sokrates (1976–1996). Prosopographisches Lexikon der Palaiologenzeit (in German). Vienna: Verlag der Österreichischen Akademie der Wissenschaften. ISBN 3-7001-3003-1.

Eastern Orthodox Church titles
Preceded by Callistus II	Ecumenical Patriarch of Constantinople; 1397 – 1410	Succeeded by Euthymius II
