= Theophanes III of Jerusalem =

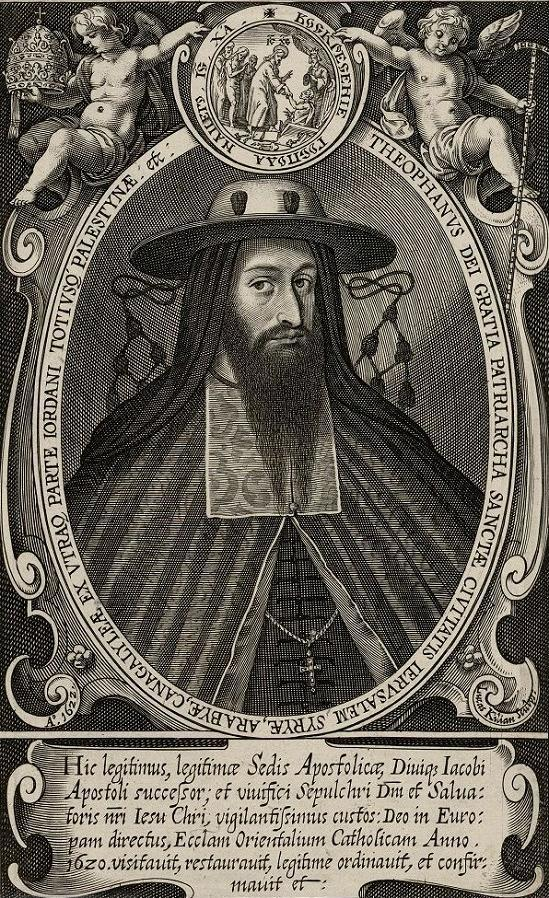
Theophanes III

Theophanes III of Jerusalem (Greek: Θεοφάνης Γ΄ Ιεροσολύμων) was the Greek Orthodox Patriarch of Jerusalem from 1608 to 1644.

As the successor to Sophronius IV, Theophanes continued Sophronius' defense of Orthodox rights to the Christian shrines in the Holy Lands. In 1611, with a decree from the Ottoman sultan, Theophanes stopped the Armenian Patriarchate of Jerusalem from taking over the celebration of the Holy Light.

Due to careless financial management by Serbian monks who lived at the Monastery of Saint Sabas, Theophanes sold religious heirlooms of value to avert surrendering the monastery and its metochion of the Archangel to the Latin and Armenian patriarchates.

In April 1619, Theophanes traveled to Moscow to participate in the enthronement of Metropolitan Philaret as Patriarch of Moscow on June 1, 1619. In August 1620, when he was returning from his visit to Moscow, Theophanes erected a new metropolis on the territory of the Polish–Lithuanian Commonwealth - the Metropolis of Kiev, Galicia and all Ruthenia. He consecrated Job Boretsky as the first metropolitan and also other bishops, during a stop in Kiev. These consecrations restored the Orthodox hierarchy in the area that was occupied by Uniate bishops after the Union of Brest in 1596 when Metropolitan Michael Rohoza turned to support the union.

According to Raphael Hawaweeny,

Theophanes did not ordain any clergy in Jerusalem and Palestine except his compatriots, and especially his relatives. He ordained his cousin Athanasius as the Metropolitan of Bethlehem, and his kinsman Paisios as an abbot of Galta Monastery in Yash. His Patriarchate of thirty seven years was spent mainly on traveling and collecting funds. When he passed away in Constantinople in the Jerusalem Metochion which he had built for himself, he was succeeded by his kinsman Paisios.

== Sources ==
- Period of the Ottoman Turks Rule
- Kiev
- Encyclopedia of Ukraine - Boretsky Yov

This article incorporates text from Theophanes III of Jerusalem at OrthodoxWiki which is licensed under the CC-BY-SA and GFDL.

Religious titles
Preceded by Sophronius IV	Patriarch of Jerusalem; 1608-1644	Succeeded by Paisius I
