= Macarius of Constantinople =

Ecumenical Patriarch of Constantinople from 1377 to 1379 and in 1390

- Ecumenical Patriarch of Constantinople
- Church: Church of Constantinople
- In office: c. June 1377 – July 1379; 30 July 1390 – late September 1390
- Predecessor: Philotheus I of Constantinople; Antony IV of Constantinople
- Successor: Nilus of Constantinople; Antony IV of Constantinople

Personal details
- Died: After 1391
- Denomination: Eastern Orthodoxy

Macarius of Constantinople (Greek: Μακάριος; died after 1391) was twice Ecumenical Patriarch of Constantinople (1377–1379, 1390).

== Bibliography ==
- Grumel, Venance (1958). Traité d'études byzantines. Vol. I. Paris: Presses Universitaires de France.
- Nicol, Donald M. (2008). Les derniers siècles de Byzance : 1261–1453. Tallandier. ISBN 978-2847345278.

Eastern Orthodox Church titles
Preceded by Philotheus I	Ecumenical Patriarch of Constantinople; 1377 – 1379	Succeeded by Nilus
Preceded by Antony IV	Ecumenical Patriarch of Constantinople; 1390	Succeeded by Antony IV (2)
