= Isaiah Kopinsky =

Metropolitan of Kiev, Galicia and all Ruthenia (1631–1632)

His Beatitude Isaiah I
- Metropolitan of Kyiv, Galicia and All Ruthenia (Rus')
- Native name: Ісая
- Church: Greek Orthodox Church of Polish-Lithuanian Commonwealth
- Metropolis: Kyiv, Galicia and all Ruthenia (Russia)
- See: Kyiv
- Elected: 20 June 1631
- Installed: 20 June 1631
- Previous posts: Archbishop of Smolensk and Chernihiv (1628) Bishop of Przemyśl and Sambir (1620); Hegumen of the Kyiv Brotherhood Epiphany Monastery (1616) Hegumen of the Mezhyhiria Savior-Transfiguration Monastery (1615)

Orders
- Ordination: by Theophanes III of Jerusalem (Patriarch of Jerusalem); Neophyt of Sofia (Metropolitan of Sofia); Abraham of Stagoi (Bishop of Stagoi)
- Rank: Metropolitan bishop

Personal details
- Born: 16th century Ruskie Voivodeship
- Died: 25 October 1640 Nizhyn, Czernihow Voivodeship
- Education: Lviv Fraternity (Brotherhood) School; Ostroh Academy

Isaiah Kopinsky (b ? in Galicia region – 5 October 1640) was the Metropolitan of Kiev, Galicia and all Rus' (Note: The title is also known as the Metropolis of Kiev, Halych and all Rus' or Metropolis of Kyiv, Halychyna, and All-Rus'. The name "Galicia" is a Latinized form of Halych, one of several regional principalities of the medieval state of Kievan Rus'.) in the Ecumenical Patriarchate of Constantinople in the Eastern Orthodox Church from 1631 to 1632.

== Biography ==
He studied at the Lviv Dormition Brotherhood School and entered a monastery as a youth. Eventually he became the hegumen of the Kyiv Epiphany Brotherhood Monastery and the Mezhyhiria Transfiguration Monastery and one of the founders of the Kyiv Epiphany Brotherhood School.

On October 6, 1620, when the Orthodox hierarchy was renewed by Patriarch Theophanes III of Jerusalem, Isaiah was consecrated bishop of Peremyshl and Sambir; however, he was not permitted to assume his post by the Polish king, and he was instead named bishop of Chernihiv and Smolensk. Isaiah also became the first bishop consecrated by Patriarch Theophanes III, three days ahead of Job Boretsky in Epiphany Church of the Kyiv Brotherhood Monastery that used to be located in the Kyiv's Podil neighborhood. Isaiah was well known as an organizer of monasteries; through his efforts the Mgarsky Monastery, the Hustynia Trinity Monastery, and other monasteries were founded. In 1631 he succeeded Metropolitan Yov Boretsky as Kyivan metropolitan.

Isaiah was a conservative and a decided foe of Catholicism and the Uniate church. He was also pro-Muscovite and favoured conciliation with the tsar and the Moscow metropolitan. After the legalization of the Orthodox hierarchy by Poland in 1632 and the election of Petro Mohyla as metropolitan of Kyiv, Isaiah was forced by the latter to relinquish his post. He became the supervisor of the Kyiv St. Michael's Golden-Domed Monastery in 1633, and lobbied unsuccessfully to regain his title from Mohyla, supported by many monasteries and Cossacks.

In 1635 he moved to Polisia, and in 1638 back to Kyiv, where he probably died.

== Notes ==
Preceded by Job Boretsky	Metropolitan of Kiev, Galicia and all Rus'; 1631–1632	Succeeded by Petro Mohyla
