= Simeon of Kiev =

Simeon of Kiev (date of birth is uncertain – died 1488) was the Metropolitan of Kiev, Galicia and all Rus' (Note: The title is also known as the Metropolis of Kiev, Halych and all Rus' or Metropolis of Kyiv, Halychyna, and All-Rus'. The name "Galicia" is a Latinized form of Halych, one of several regional principalities of the medieval state of Kievan Rus'.) in the Ecumenical Patriarchate of Constantinople of the Eastern Orthodox Church.

Simeon served as the Bishop of Polotsk before being elected as the metropolitan bishop by the council of bishops. He was later confirmed by the Patriarch of Constantinople in 1481. Evidence of confirmation of Simeon according to Hrushevsky is mentioned in a palinode of Zachary Kopystensky. With this confirmation also was restored so called "modus vivendi".

The tenure of Simeon was challenged by the anti-Eastern Orthodox sentiments of the King of Poland Casimir IV Jagiellon and the 1482 plundering of Kiev by the Crimean Khan Mengli Giray, an ally of the Grand Prince Ivan III of Moscow.

Preceded by Misail Pstruch	Metropolitan of Kiev, Galicia and all Rus'; 1481–1488	Succeeded by Jonah Hlezna
