= Euthymius II of Constantinople =

Ecumenical Patriarch of Constantinople from 1410 to 1416

- Ecumenical Patriarch of Constantinople
- Church: Church of Constantinople
- In office: 26 October 1410 – 29 March 1416
- Predecessor: Matthew I of Constantinople
- Successor: Joseph II of Constantinople

Personal details
- Died: 29 March 1416
- Denomination: Eastern Orthodoxy

Euthymius II of Constantinople (Greek: Εὐθύμιος Β΄; died 29 March 1416) was the ecumenical patriarch of Constantinople from 1410 to 1416.

He became a monk at a young age and was soon after ordained a priest. He distinguished himself for his theological and rhetorical abilities, which he employed in defence of Palamism and against the Union of the Eastern Orthodox Church with the Catholic Church, for which he was accorded the honorific appellation "Doctor of the Church". Despite being a fervent anti-unionist, he was sent by the Byzantine emperor Manuel II Palaiologos (r. 1391–1425) to participate in the discussions for a prospective union with Pope Urban VI (r. 1378–1389). The mission achieved some success, but with no firm commitments on either side and on his return to Constantinople he was promoted to archimandrite and became abbot of the prestigious Monastery of Stoudios.

Eventually, Euthymius II advanced to the post of protosynkellos, after which he became patriarch of Constantinople. During his tenure, he endeavored to remove the Church from imperial control and act autonomously. Of his writings, only a philosophical treatise "On being and not being" and two letters survive. Euthymius II died on 29 March 1416.

== Notes and references ==
Eastern Orthodox Church titles
Preceded by Matthew I	Ecumenical Patriarch of Constantinople; 1410 – 1416	Succeeded by Joseph II
