= Nilus of Constantinople =

Ecumenical Patriarch of Constantinople from 1380 to 1388

- Ecumenical Patriarch of Constantinople
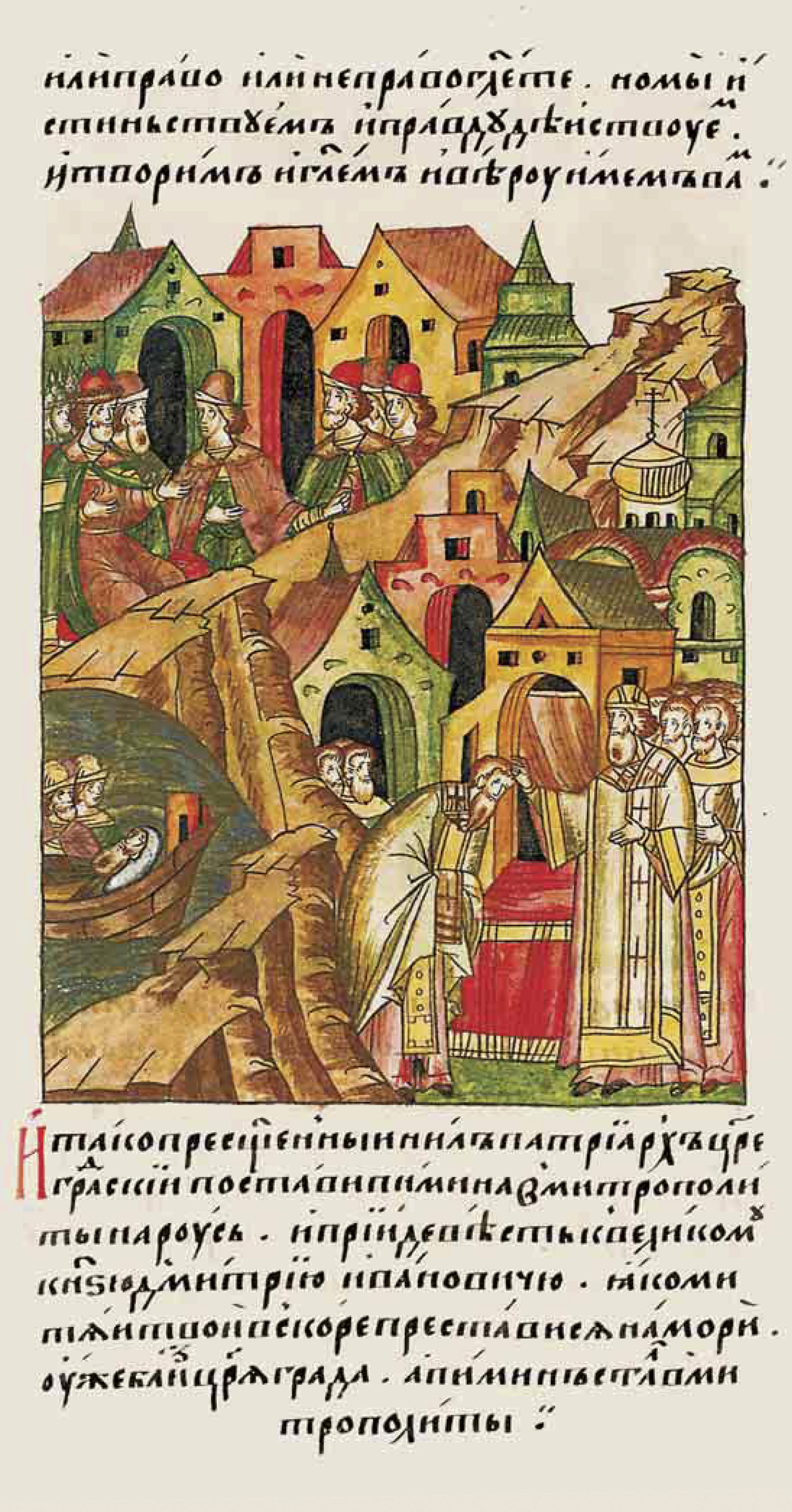
- Nilus installing Pimen as metropolitan of Kiev, miniature from the Illustrated Chronicle of Ivan the Terrible (16th century)
- Church: Church of Constantinople
- In office: March/April 1380 – 1 February 1388
- Predecessor: Macarius of Constantinople
- Successor: Antony IV of Constantinople

Personal details
- Died: 1 February 1388

Nilus of Constantinople (Greek: Νεῖλος Κεραμεύς; died 1 February 1388) was Ecumenical Patriarch of Constantinople between March/April 1380 and 1 February 1388. He was a Hesychast.

== Career ==
In 1380, he convened a synod to decide the metropolitanate of Moscow, choosing Bulgarian-born Hesychast Cyprian (1336–1406).

In 1382, Stephen of Perm wrote a letter to Nilus concerning the Strigolniki schism.

== Works ==
Nilus was a prolific writer in the religious sphere, including many homilies and an encomium of Gregory Palamas.

Nilus also wrote the Ekthesis Nea ("New Exposition"), a short treatise describing diplomatic modes of address in the Orthodox Church and with other Christian rulers, both secular and religious, in the 14th century.

== Notes and references ==
Eastern Orthodox Church titles
Preceded by Macarius	Ecumenical Patriarch of Constantinople; 1380 – 1388	Succeeded by Antony IV
