= Antony IV of Constantinople =

Ecumenical Patriarch of Constantinople from 1389 to 1390 and from 1390 to 1397

- Ecumenical Patriarch of Constantinople
- Church: Church of Constantinople
- In office: January 1389 – July 1390 c. September 1390 – May 1397
- Predecessor: Nilus of Constantinople, Macarius of Constantinople
- Successor: Macarius of Constantinople, Callistus II of Constantinople

Personal details
- Died: May 1397
- Denomination: Eastern Orthodoxy

Antony IV of Constantinople (Greek: Ἀντώνιος; died May 1397) was the Ecumenical Patriarch of Constantinople for two terms, from January 1389 to July 1390, and again from c. September 1390 until his death.

== Life ==
He was originally a hieromonk, possibly from the Dionysiou monastery in Mount Athos. He was deposed during the usurpation of John VII Palaiologos in July 1390, and replaced by Macarius of Constantinople, who had already served in the office in 1377–1379. After the restoration of John V Palaiologos and Manuel II Palaiologos a few months later, he was restored to his post.

He is notable for his correspondence with Władysław II Jagiełło, Grand Duke of Lithuania, urging him to join in a crusade against the Turks along with the Hungarians, and with Vasily I of Moscow, to whom he defended not only the universal spiritual authority of the Constantinopolitan patriarchate, but also the universal authority of the Byzantine emperors, regardless of the actual diminished state of the Byzantine Empire.

During the period of turmoil within the Russian Church, in which Metropolitan Cyprian and Metropolitan Pimen made competing claims to the Russian metropolitanate, Antony decreed that Cyprian was "the one and only metropolitan of Russia" in 1389.

== Bibliography ==
- Fennell, John (14 January 2014) [1995]. A History of the Russian Church to 1488. Routledge. ISBN 978-1-317-89720-0.
- Kazhdan, Alexander (1991). The Oxford Dictionary of Byzantium. Oxford University Press. p. 125. ISBN 978-0-19-504652-6.

Eastern Orthodox Church titles
Preceded by Nilus	Ecumenical Patriarch of Constantinople; 1389 – 1390	Succeeded by Macarius (2)
Preceded by Macarius (2)	Ecumenical Patriarch of Constantinople; 1390 – 1397	Succeeded by Callistus II
