= Jonah Hlezna =

Jonah Hlezna (date of birth uncertain – died 1494) was the Metropolitan of Kiev, Galicia and all Rus' (Note: The title is also known as the Metropolis of Kiev, Halych and all Rus' or Metropolis of Kyiv, Halychyna, and All-Rus'. The name "Galicia" is a Latinized form of Halych, one of several regional principalities of the medieval state of Kievan Rus'.) in the Ecumenical Patriarchate of Constantinople of the Eastern Orthodox Church.

From 1482 to 1488, Hlezna served as the Archbishop of Polotsk. Upon a death of his predecessor Simeon of Kiev in 1488 provisionally held the see. Upon the approval of the Grand Duke of Lithuania and King of Poland — Casimir IV Jagiellon — Jonah was elected at the Council (Sobor) of bishops in 1492. which was also attended by Casimir. The same year he also sent to the Patriarch of Constantinople for the blessing his representative Joseph Bolharynovich, who at that time served as an archimandrite of the Slutsk Saint Trinity Monastery.

Jonah cared for the development of church buildings and monasteries. He regularly conducted visitations over his metropolitan archdiocese (Pinsk, Minsk, others), sought help of Eastern Orthodox princes and nobility to improve the state of Eastern Orthodox Church in the Grand Duchy of Lithuania.

After his death, the next elected metropolitan was Macarius I.

Preceded by Simeon of Kiev	Metropolitan of Kiev, Galicia and all Rus'; 1488–1494	Succeeded by Macarius I of Kiev
