= Job Boretsky =

Metropolitan of Kiev, Galicia and all Ruthenia (1620–1631)

Saint Job (Boretsky)

Metropolitan of Kyiv, Galicia and all Rus'
- Born: 1560; Bircha
- Died: March 2, 1631 (aged 70–71); Kyiv
- Venerated in: Orthodox Church of Ukraine
- Canonized: 2008
- Feast: 15 March

Job Boretsky (Ukrainian: Йов, secular name Ivan Matfeyevich Boretsky, Polish: Iwan Borecki, died 2 March 1631) was the Metropolitan of Kiev, Galicia and all Rus' (Note: The title is also known as the Metropolis of Kiev, Halych and all Rus' or Metropolis of Kyiv, Halychyna, and All-Rus'. The name "Galicia" is a Latinized form of Halych, one of several regional principalities of the medieval state of Kievan Rus'.) in the Ecumenical Patriarchate of Constantinople in the Eastern Orthodox Church from 1620 to 1631. He was a Ruthenian national, born in Bircza, Ruthenian Voivodeship in the Polish–Lithuanian Commonwealth at an unknown date. He died in Kyiv. As Metropolitan of Kiev, Galicia and all Rus' he was known as an outstanding church leader, educator, and defender of the Eastern Orthodox faith.

== Biography ==
His family came from Bircha (Bircza) in Galicia. He was educated at the Lviv Dormition Brotherhood School and abroad. He worked as a teacher and rector at the Lviv Dormition Brotherhood School (1604–5) and was the first rector of the Kyiv Epiphany Brotherhood School (1615–18). In 1619, he became hegumen of St. Michael's Golden-Domed Monastery of Kyiv.

In August 1620 the patriarch of Jerusalem, Theophanes III, ordained Boretsky metropolitan of Kyiv, Halychyna, and All-Rus'. Boretsky had a strong influence on the Cossacks under Petro Konashevych-Sahaidachny's hetmancy. As, metropolitan Boretsky composed a petition in defense of the Orthodox hierarchy entitled Protestacja (1621). Along with the Greek-Catholic Metropolitan bishop of Kyiv Josyf Veliamyn Rutsky, he favoured a general reconciliation within the Ukrainian church, but failed to gain the support of the Cossacks for his plans. A prolific translator, Boretsky also wrote poems honouring saints, petitions, prefaces, and edicts. "Perestoroha" is attributed to him. He was the co-author of "Apolleia Apolohii" (A Refutation of 'A Defense,' 1628) and the translator of "Antolohion" from the Greek (1619). Boretsky also lent money to Kyivan printer Tymofiy Verbytskyi and owned the building in Podil which housed the printing house managed by Verbytskyi's colleague Spiridon Sobol. An appeal to Boretsky is contained in Verbytskyi's Horologion, which was published in 1625.

== Notes ==
Preceded by Michael Rohoza	Metropolitan of Kiev, Galicia and all Rus'; 1620–1631	Succeeded by Isaiah Kopinsky
