= Misail Pstruch =

Misail Pstruch (Polish: Mizael Piestrucz; born undetermined date, died fall of 1480 or winter of 1480/81) was the acting Metropolitan of Kiev, Galicia and all Rus' (Note: The title is also known as the Metropolis of Kiev, Halych and all Rus' or Metropolis of Kyiv, Halychyna, and All-Rus'. The name "Galicia" is a Latinized form of Halych, one of several regional principalities of the medieval state of Kievan Rus'.) in the Ecumenical Patriarchate of Constantinople of the Eastern Orthodox Church. While he was recognised by King Casimir IV Jagiellon, he was not recognised by the Patriarch of Constantinople. Misail is better known for his letter to Pope Sixtus IV in connection to the Florentine Union.

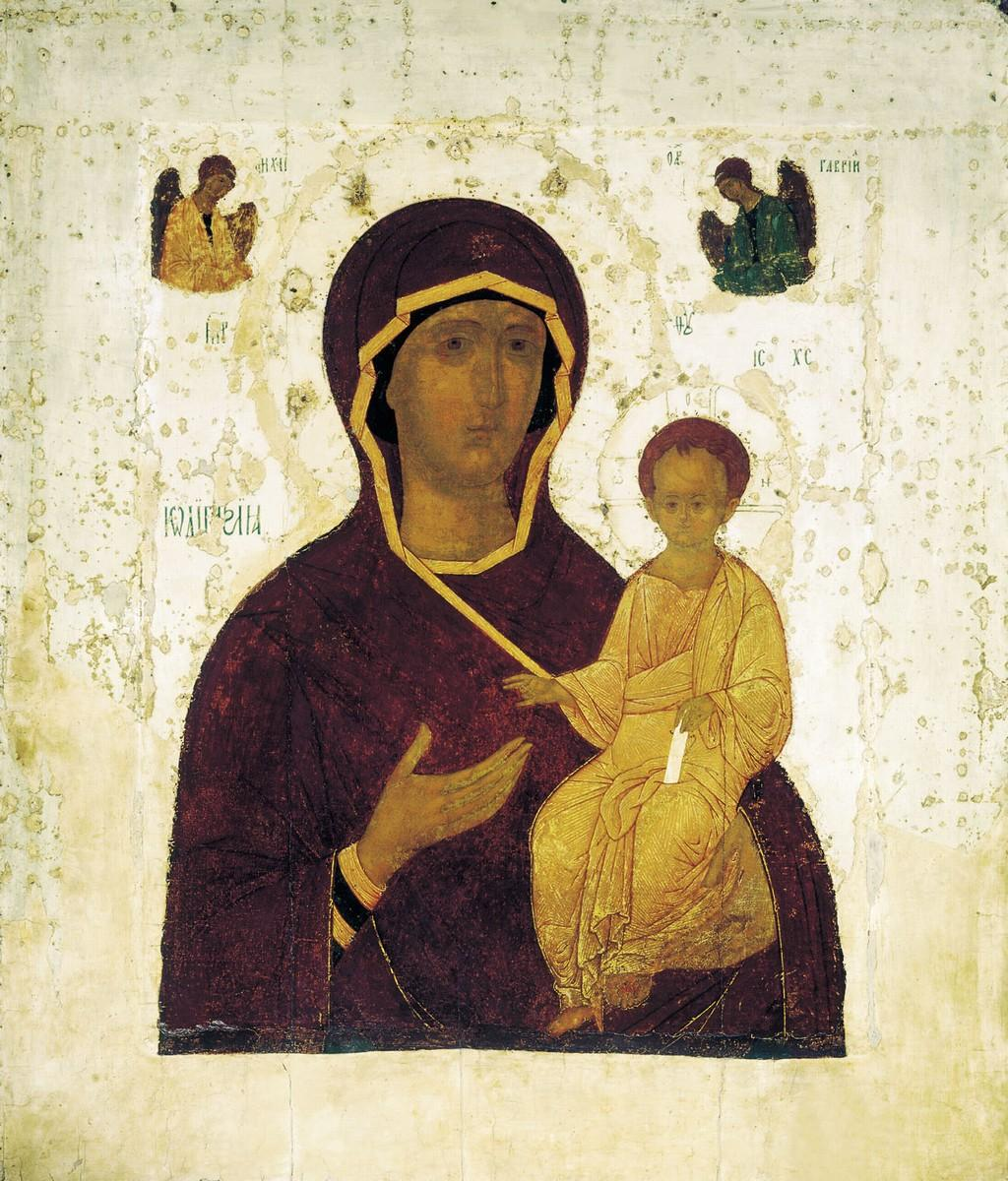
A Dionisius version of the Theotokos of Smolensk (c. 1500)

His real last name was Pestrutsky of Belarusian boyar family Drutsky-Sokolinsky-Babych. Misail established on his funds the Saint Trinity monastery in Czereja (today Chareja, Belarus) where he served as an archimandrite. In the beginning of 1450 he was appointed as the Archbishop of Smolensk. In 1454 (or 1456) he traveled to the Grand Prince of Moscow Vasily the Blind for the miraculous icon of Theotokos of Smolensk that was taken away in 1404. The Grand Prince of Moscow Vasily the Blind released the icon with special church honors and left in Moscow its exact copy.

Following the death of Metropolitan of Kiev Gregory the Bulgarian in 1474, Misail became his successor. Confirmation of Misail in metropolitan see by the King of Poland and Grand Duke of Lithuania Casimir IV Jagiellon, was delayed. According to Mykhailo Hrushevsky, the delay in his appointment might have been due to the resistance of the clergy of the Latin Church who were irked by the precedent of appointing Gregory the Bulgarian to the metropolitan see by the Pope. During that time in 1476 the Ecumenical Patriarch of Constantinople Raphael I consecrated a native of the Grand Duchy of Tver Spyridon as the Metropolitan bishop of Kiev. After arriving to the Grand Duchy of Lithuania, Spyridon was imprisoned by state authorities and was released only in 1482 (after the death of Misail).

== Notes ==
Preceded by Gregory the Bulgarian	Metropolitan of Kiev and All-Rus'; 1474–1480 (acting)	Succeeded by Simeon of Kiev
