= Joseph II of Constantinople =

Ecumenical Patriarch of Constantinople from 1416 to 1439

- Ecumenical Patriarch of Constantinople
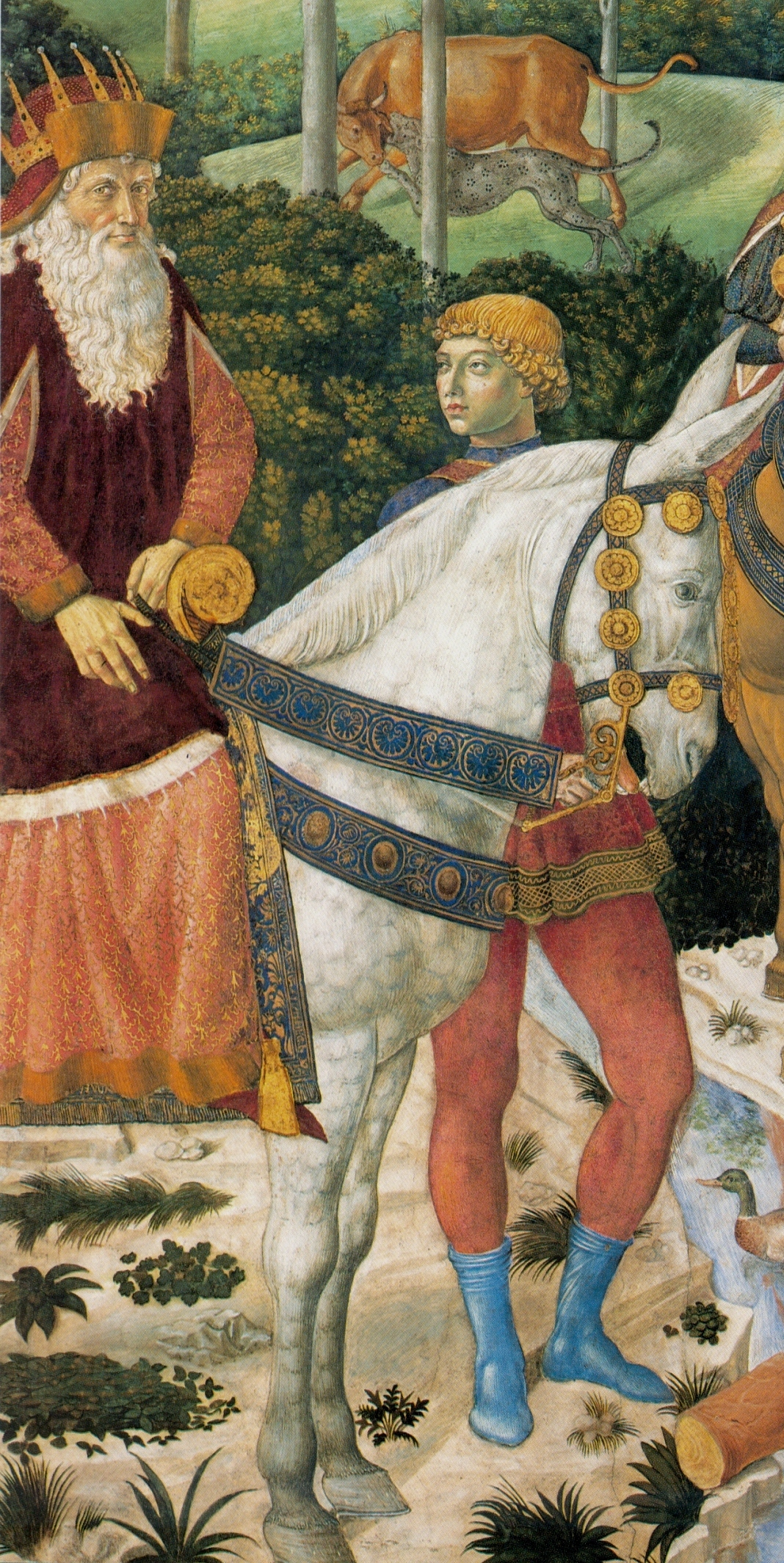
- Joseph II of Constantinople, fresco by Benozzo Gozzoli, Cappella dei Magi, Florence
- Church: Church of Constantinople
- In office: 21 May 1416 – 10 June 1439
- Predecessor: Euthymius II of Constantinople
- Successor: Metrophanes II of Constantinople

Personal details
- Born: 1360 Bulgaria
- Died: 10 June 1439 (aged 78–79) Florence, Republic of Florence
- Buried: Santa Maria Novella
- Denomination: Eastern Orthodoxy

Joseph II of Constantinople (Greek: Ἰωσήφ; 1360 – 10 June 1439) was Ecumenical Patriarch of Constantinople from 1416 to 1439.

== Life ==
Born the (possibly illegitimate) son of Ivan Shishman of Bulgaria in 1360, and a Greek mother, little is known of his early life before he became a monk on Mount Athos. He became Metropolis of Ephesus in 1393 before being elected Patriarch of Constantinople on 21 May 1416. Together with Byzantine Emperor John VIII Palaiologos, 23 Metropolitan bishops and about 700 scholars and theologians, he took part in the Council of Florence in 1431. While in Florence, he was quartered in the Palazzo Ferrantini. He is portrayed in Benozzo Gozzoli's frescoes in the Magi Chapel of Palazzo Medici Riccardi, which celebrates the entrance of the Byzantine dignitaries in the city.

Joseph II was very old and ill and died on 10 June 1439. His death caused much grief to all present at the council, as he was a fervent supporter of union between the Churches; before his death, he drew up and signed an important pro-union declaration for the council. His grave in the Dominican convent church of Santa Maria Novella in Florence survives, with an elaborate fresco portrait in a semi-Byzantine style. He was succeeded as Patriarch of Constantinople by Metrophanes II of Constantinople, who was appointed by Emperor John VIII on account of his similarly pro-unionist sentiments.

He was cousin of tsar Constantine II of Bulgaria.

== Bibliography ==
- Council of Florence, at the Catholic Encyclopedia.
- Sergey F. Dezhnyuk, "Council of Florence: The Unrealized Union", CreateSpace, 2017.
- Plamen Pavlov. Patriarh Jossif II (in Bulgarian).

Eastern Orthodox Church titles
| Preceded by Euthymius II | Ecumenical Patriarch of Constantinople; 1416 – 1439 | Succeeded by Metrophanes II |
