= Callistus II of Constantinople =

Ecumenical Patriarch of Constantinople in 1397

Saint Callistus II of Constantinople
- Ecumenical Patriarch of Constantinople
- Church: Church of Constantinople
- In office: 17 May 1397 – c. August 1397
- Predecessor: Antony IV of Constantinople
- Successor: Matthew I of Constantinople

Personal details
- Died: After 1397
- Denomination: Eastern Orthodoxy

Sainthood
- Feast day: 22 November

Callistus II of Constantinople (Xanthopoulos or Xanthopulus; Medieval Greek: Κάλλιστος Ξανθόπουλος; died after 1397) was a Byzantine Hesychast monk and spiritual writer who reigned as Ecumenical Patriarch of Constantinople in 1397. He was Patriarch through the reign of the Byzantine Emperor Manuel II Palaiologos, and through his short Patriarchal reign, Constantinople was under siege by the Ottoman Sultan Bayezid I. Within the Orthodox Church, his memory is celebrated on 22 November.

His surname indicates that he was from the monastery of Xanthopoulos. The majority of Patriarchs in the 14th century were monks in the Hesychast tradition.

== Bibliography ==
- Joan M. Hussey (1986), The Orthodox Church in the Byzantine Empire, Oxford University Press, p. 289.
- Κάλλιστος Β´ Ξανθόπουλος (in Greek). Ecumenical Patriarchate.
- Hunter, H. D. (2003). "Callistus II Xanthopulus, Patriarch of Constantinople". New Catholic Encyclopedia. Archived from the original on 6 March 2016 – via HighBeam Research.
- Joan M. Hussey, The Orthodox Church in the Byzantine Empire, Oxford University Press, 1986.

Eastern Orthodox Church titles
Preceded by Antony IV	Ecumenical Patriarch of Constantinople; 1397	Succeeded by Matthew I
