= Michael Rohoza =

Metropolitan of Kiev, Galicia and all Rus' from 1588 to 1596

- Metropolitan of Kiev, Galicia and all Rus'
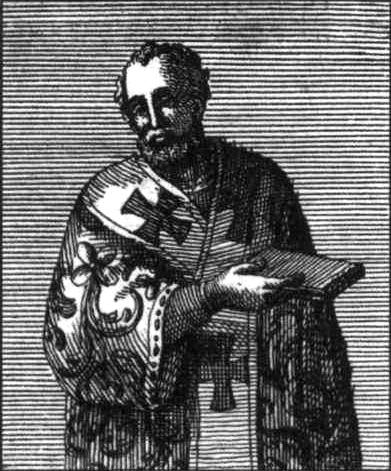
- Church: Eastern Orthodox Church, later Catholic Church
- Appointed: 1589
- Term ended: 1599
- Predecessor: Onesiphorus Devochka
- Successor: Hypatius Pociej in 1599 (Ruthenian Uniate Church); Job Boretsky in 1620 (Ecumenical Patriarchate)

Orders
- Consecration: August 1589 by Patriarch Jeremias II

Personal details
- Born: about 1540
- Died: 1599 Navahrudak, Grand Duchy of Lithuania

Michael Rohoza (Note: Belarusian: Міхал Рагоза; Ukrainian: Михайло Рогоза; Polish: Michał Rahoza; Russian: Михаил Рагоза) (died 1599) was the Metropolitan of Kiev, Galicia and all Rus' in the Patriarchate of Constantinople of the Eastern Orthodox Church from 1588 to 1596. In 1595, he signed the Union of Brest which moved the metropolis from the ecclesiastical jurisdiction of the Patriarchate of Constantinople to the jurisdiction of the Holy See. By this act, the Ruthenian Uniate Church was formed in the territory of the Polish–Lithuanian Commonwealth. From 1596 until his death in 1599, he held the title of Metropolitan of Kiev, Galicia and all Rus' (Note: The title is also known as the Metropolis of Kiev, Halych and all Rus' or Metropolis of Kyiv, Halychyna, and All-Rus'. The name "Galicia" is a Latinized form of Halych, one of several regional principalities of the medieval state of Kievan Rus'.) in the Ruthenian Uniate Church.

== Early life ==
Michael was born in Volhynia about 1540 from a noble Belarusians family in the region of Minsk county. He probably studied in a Jesuit college in Vilnius where he worked as clerk for the prince Bogush Koretsky, a voivode of Vilnius. He later entered in the monastery of the Ascension in Minsk. In 1579 he became the archimandrite of the monastery.

== Career ==
At that time, there were two ecclesiastical titles of the Eastern Orthodox Church in the former Kievan Rus' with similar names and origins; the "Metropolis of Kiev, Galicia and all Rus'" and the "Metropolis of Moscow and all Rus'". The territory of the former was effectively confined to the territory of the Polish–Lithuanian Commonwealth while the territory of the latter included the Tsardom of Russia. Both metropolitans were recognized, and sometimes consecrated, by the Ecumenical Patriarch of Constantinople. In 1589, Patriarch Jeremias II of Constantinople visited the Tsardom of Russia. At the request of Boris Godunov — the de facto regent of the Tsardom — he raised the "Metropolis of Moscow and all Rus'" to the status of a patriarchate.

On his return trip to Constantinople, Jeremias also visited the Polish–Lithuanian Commonwealth. In agreement with King Sigismund III Vasa, he deposed the Metropolitan Onesiphorus Devochka, probably because he was a digamy (the second marriage for priests) and he tolerated this use. King Sigismund, under the advice of such magnates as the voivode of Navahrudak (Teodor Skumin-Tyszkiewicz) and the voivode of Kiev (Konstanty Ostrogski), put forward Michel Rohoza as his candidate for the metropolis. In August 1589 at Vilnius, Jeremias consecrated Michel as Metropolis of Kiev, Halych and all Rus'.

As Metropolitan, he started to reform the Church. He wished to improve the mores of the clergy and to reduce of the meddling of lay people (and of confraternities) in the life of the Church and in monasteries. To this end, he summoned a synod in 1590. His attempts of reform were opposed by the stauropegics. Since it proved difficult to carry on the reforms, he began to look to Rome.

In 1590, Metropolitan Rohoza with all his suffragan bishops, subscribed to a document that solicited a union with Catholic Church on condition that this union of faith would preserve the Byzantine rite, the liturgical practices and the canon law of the metropolis. This was agreed and was formalized in a document on 2 December 1594 and again in two petitions, one to the king and one to Pope Clement VIII, undersigned in Brest on 12 June 1595. This Union of Brest, as it became known, was formally proclaimed 8 October 1596. While Rohoza signed the union, he later tried to hinder its action, but without results.

Rohoza died between June and August 1599. He was succeeded by the bishop of Volodymyr-Volynskyi, Hypatius Pociej, a fierce supporter of the union. Not all the Ukrainians supported the union, and twenty years later, in 1620 the Patriarch of Jerusalem re-established a Kievan Metropolia under his own jurisdiction, which first Metropolitan was Yov Boretsky, so duplicating the hierarchy.

== Notes ==
Eastern Orthodox Church titles
Preceded by Onesiphorus Devochka	Metropolitan of Kiev, Galicia and all Rus'; 1589 – 1596	Succeeded by Job Boretsky recreated in the Exarchate of Ukraine
Ruthenian Uniate Church titles
Preceded by New creation	Metropolitan of Kiev, Galicia and all Ruthenia; 1596 – 1599	Succeeded by Hypatius Pociej
