= Metrophanes II of Constantinople =

Ecumenical Patriarch of Constantinople from 1440 to 1443

- Ecumenical Patriarch of Constantinople
- Church: Church of Constantinople
- In office: 4 May 1440 – 1 August 1443
- Predecessor: Joseph II of Constantinople
- Successor: Gregory III of Constantinople

Personal details
- Died: 1 August 1443 Constantinople
- Denomination: Eastern Orthodoxy

Metrophanes II of Constantinople (Greek: Μητροφάνης; died 1 August 1443) was Ecumenical Patriarch of Constantinople within the Church of Constantinople during the period 1440–1443. He served as Bishop of Cyzicus in Asia Minor when he was called to join the delegation of bishops attending the Council of Florence. He was appointed by the Emperor John VIII Palaiologos on 4 May 1440 as successor to Joseph II of Constantinople following the death of the latter in Florence. For his submission to the Union, he was contemptuously nicknamed Mitrofonos (Mother-Killer) by anti-Unionists. Metrophanes II consecrated several unionist bishops and repeatedly pressed Emperor John VIII to support the union openly. John VIII finally agreed to summon a local council of bishops, but Metrophanes II died before the council could meet.

Metrophanes II died in Constantinople on 1 August 1443.

== Bibliography ==
- Louis Bréhier, Life and Death of Byzantium, republication Abin Michel, Paris, 1969.
- Ivan Đurić, Twilight of Byzantium, Maisonneuve & Larose, Paris, 1996 (ISBN 2-7068-1097-1).
- Venance Grumel, Treaty of Byzantine Studies, vol. I - The Chronology, Presses Universitaires de France, Paris, 1958.
- Donald Nicol, The last centuries of Byzantium, 1261–1453, Texto reissue Les Belles Lettres, 2005 (ISBN 978-2-84734-527-8).
- Nicolas Viton de Saint-Allais, The art of verifying dates, Volume I, Paris, 1818, p. 493.
- Joseph Gill, The Council of Florence Cambridge, Cambridge University Press, 1959.

Eastern Orthodox Church titles
Preceded by Joseph II	Ecumenical Patriarch of Constantinople; 1440 – 1443	Succeeded by Gregory III
