= Medieval Bulgarian literature =

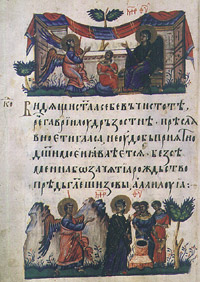
A page from a 14th-century Bulgarian manuscript Tomić Psalter.

Medieval Bulgarian literature is Bulgarian literature in the Middle Ages.

With the Bulgarian Empire welcoming the disciples of Cyril and Methodius after they were expelled from Great Moravia, the country became a centre of rich literary activity during what is known as the Golden Age of medieval Bulgarian culture. In the late 9th, the 10th and early 11th century literature in Bulgaria prospered, with many books being translated from Byzantine Greek, but also new works being created. Many scholars worked in the Preslav and Ohrid Literary Schools, creating the Cyrillic script for their needs. Bulgarian scholars and works influenced most of the Slavic world, spreading Old Bulgarian (Old Church Slavonic), the Cyrillic and the Glagolitic alphabet to Kievan Rus', medieval Serbia and medieval Croatia. Important work from this period is Didactic gospels, a collection of sermons, with a prototype the didactic of Bishop Constantine of Preslav written in Old Bulgarian (Old Church Slavonic) language in 894. Another important work is Zakon Sudnyi Liudem, the oldest preserved Slavic legal text, written in Old Bulgarian in the late ninth or early tenth century, probably in Bulgaria. Its source was Byzantine law.

As the Bulgarian Empire was subjugated by the Byzantines in 1018, Bulgarian literary activity declined. However, after the establishment of the Second Bulgarian Empire followed another period of upsurge during the time of Patriarch Evtimiy in the 14th century. Evtimiy founded the Tarnovo Literary School that had a significant impact on the literature of Serbia and Muscovite Russia, as some writers fled the Bulgarian-Ottoman Wars. Bulgarian literature continued in the Ottoman Empire. Important works from this period are:

- Tetraevangelia of Ivan Alexander, 1355-1356 - one of the most famous works of the Tarnovo Literary School;

- Sofia Psalter, 1337;

- Tomić Psalter, c. 1360.

Medieval Bulgarian literature was dominated by religious themes, most works being hymns, treatises, religious miscellanies, apocrypha and hagiographies, most often heroic and instructive.

== See also ==
- Anonymous Bulgarian Chronicle
- Bulgarian historiography
- List of Glagolitic manuscripts
- Pliska-Preslav culture

== Sources ==
- "Старобългарска литература",Донка Петканова
- Илиев, И. Епитетът в славянобългарската агиография от 14-15 век. Пловдив. Пигмалион. 2005
- Епитетът в славянобългарската агиография от 14-15 век
