= Pamvo Berynda =

Ukrainian lexicographer and monk (1560-1632)

- Павло Беринда
- Born: c.1560 Galicia (Ruthenian Voivodeship), Crown of the Kingdom of Poland
- Died: 23 July 1632 (aged 72); Kyiv, Polish-Lithuanian Commonwealth
- Occupations: writer, lexicographer, pedagogue, engraver, printer
- Writing career
- Language: Old Church Slavonic, Old Ukrainian (Ruthenian)
- Period: 1597-1630

Pamvo Berynda (born Pavlo Berynda, c. 1560 in Yezupil (according to other sources, in Chaikovychi near Sambir) – died on July 23 (O.S. July 13), 1632 in Kyiv) was a Ukrainian lexicographer, linguist, and Orthodox monk, best remembered for authoring The Slovene – Rus' Lexicon. He was also one of the pioneers of Ukrainian drama.

== Life ==
An engraver and printer by profession, Berynda was a highly educated person and knew Old Church Slavonic, Greek, Latin and Polish languages. He was born around the third quarter of the 16th century. The presence of local dialectisms in Berynda's publications hints at his origins from Boikivshchyna, Pokuttia or Upper Dniester region. Under the patronage of Hedeon Balaban, in 1597-1608 he worked at the printing houses in Striatyn and Krylos. His 1606 didactic gospels for the first time in Ukrainian printing included illustrations to the text. In 1613-1619 Berynda worked at the school and printing house of Lviv Orthodox brotherhood. After 1619 together with his son he moved to Kyiv and settled in Kyiv Pechersk Lavra monastery, where he remained for the rest of his life. In Kyiv Berynda worked as an editor, translator, printer and engraver. During that time he was affiliated with a group of intellectuals headed by Yelysei Pletenetskyi. He died on 23 (13) July 1632.

== Main works ==
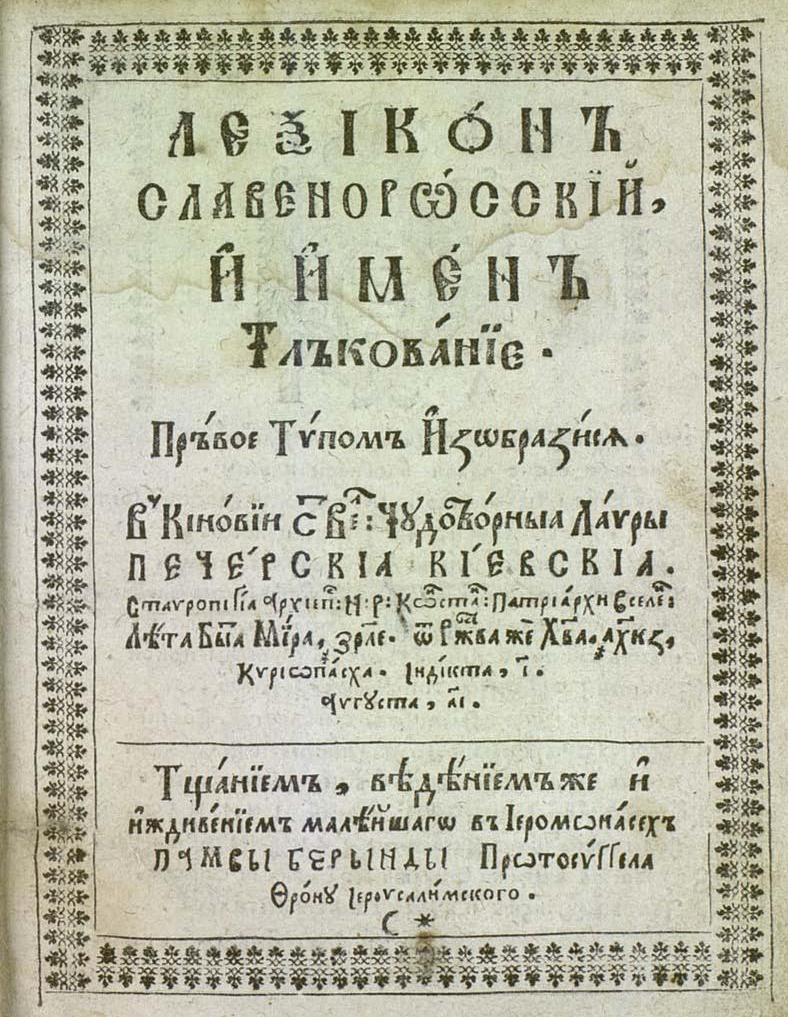
Front page of Berynda's Lexicon

Berynda's Lexicon, printed in 1627 in Kyiv, included the translation of more than 7,000 words from Church Slavonic into Old Ukrainian. Continuing the legacy of Zyzaniy's Leksys (1596), it was the first dictionary in East Slavic lands composed in accordance to scientific norms. A second edition of the work emerged in 1653 at a monastery near Orsha. The Lexicon played an important role in the standardization of both Church Slavonic and Ukrainian language and was used as a schoolbook until the end of the 18th century.

Berynda also contributed to a number of publications issued by Kyiv Pechersk Lavra and wrote panegyric epigrams for a number of prominent people, including metropolitan Petro Mohyla. His 1616 book "На рожство... вЂршЂ для утЂхи православним христіаном" ("On Christmas... verses for the joy of Orthodox Christians"), dedicated to Lviv archbishop Jeremiah Tysarowski, introduced dramatic elements and decorations and can be seen as a prototype of school drama. Berynda was also an author of a number of woodcuts.

== Legacy ==
Berynda's lexicon retained great influence throughout the 17th and 18th centuries and was used by numerous authors to creat their own dictionaries of Church Slavonic. Notable cases of such use is the Latin-Slavonic dictionary of Epiphanius Slavinetsky, the 1649 Romanian translation of the dictionary created at Cozia Monastery, the 1704 Slavonic-Greek-Latin dictionary published in Moscow by F. Polikarpov and the 1722 Church Slavonic-Polish dictionary printed in Suprasl.
