= Moscow Print Yard =

First Russian publishing house (1553)

Coordinates: 55°45′27″N 37°37′19″E

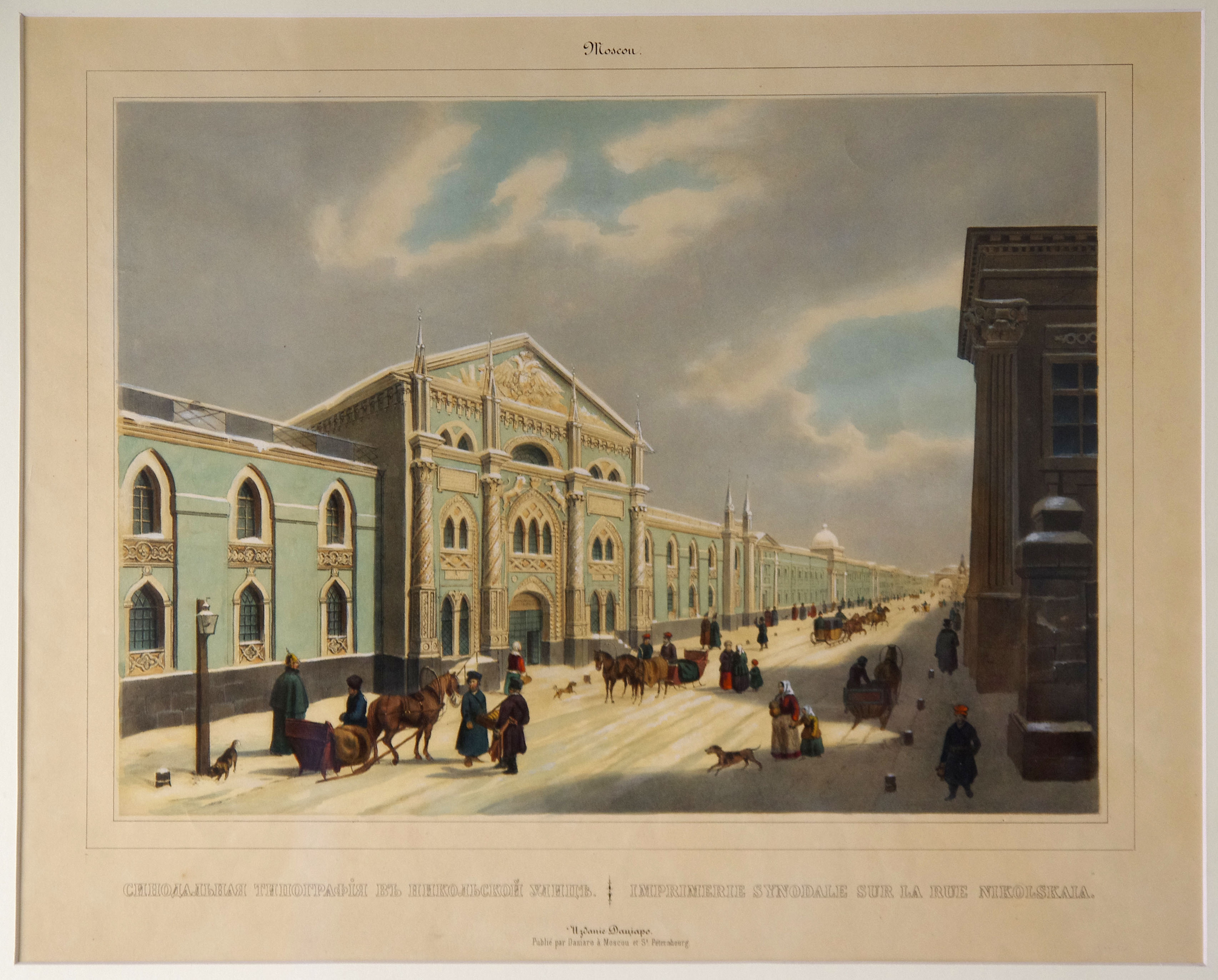
The Print Yard on Nikolskaya Street in the early 19th century

The Moscow Print Yard (Russian: Московский Печатный двор) was the first publishing house in Russia. It was established in Kitai-gorod at the behest of Ivan the Terrible in 1553. The historic headquarters of the Print Yard now house the Russian State University for the Humanities.

The Moscow Print Yard was first mentioned in Aufzeichnungen über den Moskauer Staat by Heinrich von Staden. It is known to have published Lenten Triodion, Triodion in Pictures, Gospel, Psalter, and other books which did not have any imprints (hence, another name for the Print Yard, the Anonymous Printing House). On March 1 of 1564, Ivan Fyodorov and Pyotr Timofeyev (Mstislavets) published the very first dated book called Apostle (Апостол) at the Moscow Print Yard. In 1565, the printing house published Chasovnik (Часовник, or Book of hours) and then Psalter (1568).

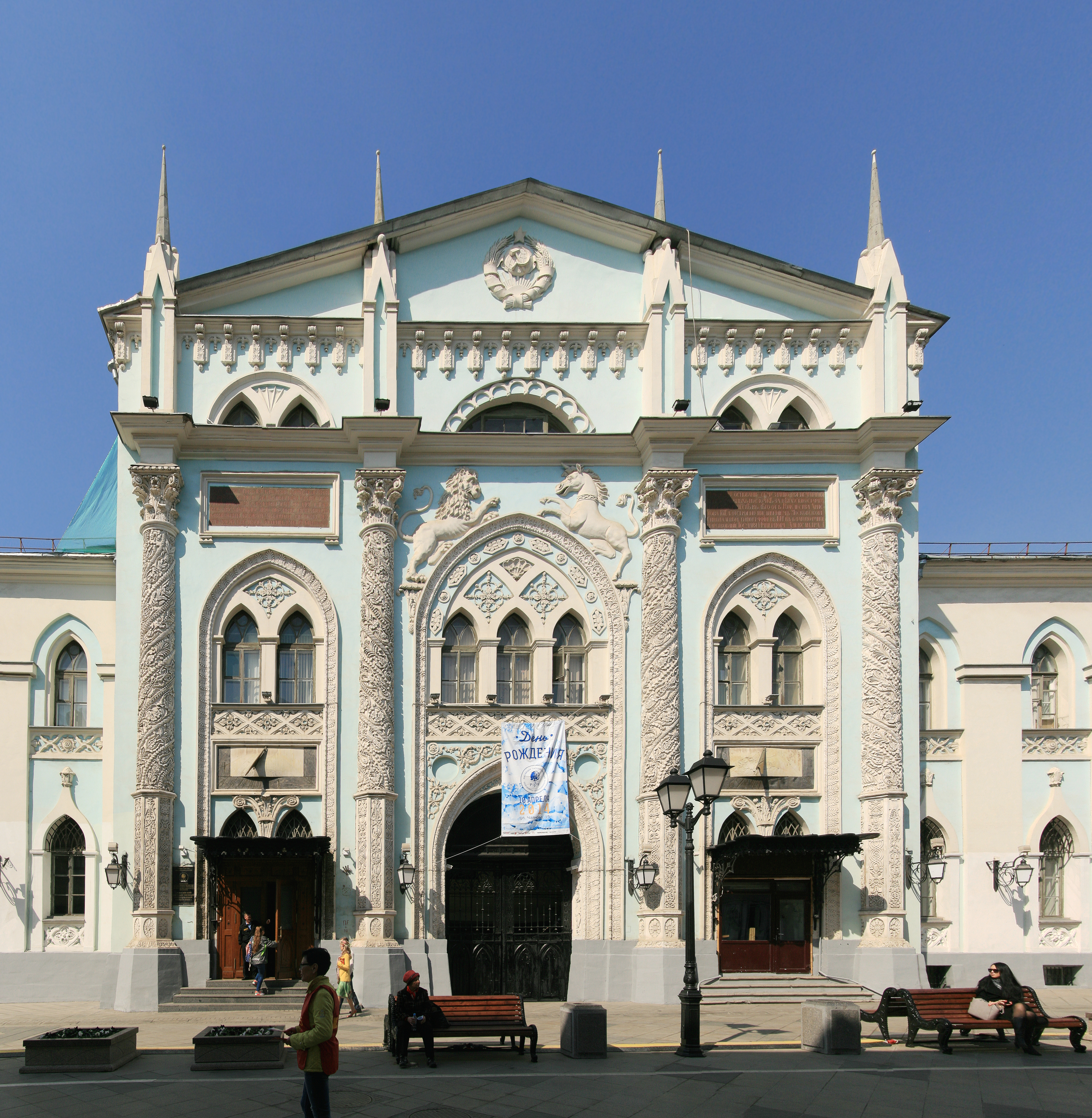
The main building has a highly distinctive façade

In 1612, the Moscow Print Yard was destroyed by fire, but it was soon rebuilt. In 1620, a two-story stone chamber was erected for the Print Yard, moving seven typesetters and eighty employees from the Kremlin to the new premises. In 1625, several underground storage rooms and tunnels were built, leading to the Kremlin. The fire of 1634 destroyed all of the buildings belonging to the Print Yard. In 1642–1643, several new stone chambers for the publishing house were built under the supervision of an apprentice from Stoneworks Prikaz named T. Shaturin. In 1644, an apprentice, I. Neverov, and a foreigner named Christopher erected Gothic stone gates with towers, which divided the chambers of the Print Yard in two. These buildings housed the Bookprinting Prikaz and Proofreading Chamber. In 1679, they dismantled the so-called old "Big Chamber" building in the Print Yard, which was adjacent to the wall of Kitai-gorod. Stonemasons S. Dmitriyev and I. Artemyev supervised the erection of a new building over the old foundation, which would later be painted by court icon painter L. Ivanov and house the proofreading chamber and a library.

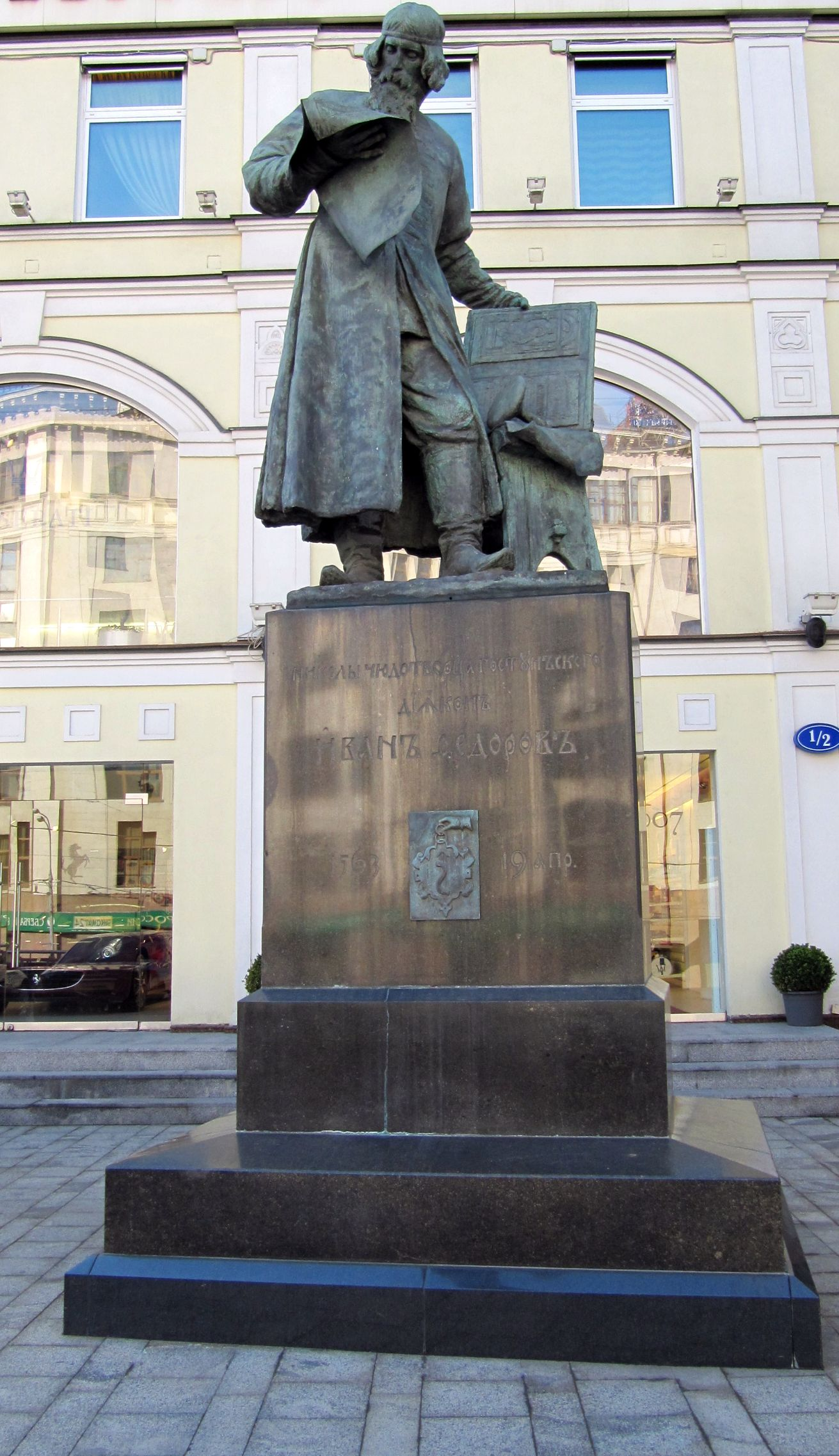
A statue of Ivan Fyodorov was unveiled in front of the Print Yard in 1909

In 1653, Patriarch Nikon (who supervised the work of the Print Yard) sent a scientific expedition to the East. Its leader, A. Sukhanov, brought five hundred Greek manuscripts from Mount Athos to Moscow. These books laid the foundation for the library of the Moscow Print Yard. In 1681, they opened a Greek school on the premises of the printing house. By the end of the 17th century, the staff of the Print Yard already numbered 165 people. It was placed under the authority of the Big Palace Prikaz (Приказ Большого дворца) and published the so-called menology books (Анфологион, or Anfologion, 1660), polemical works, translations, textbooks (Букварь 'Primer' by Vasily Burtsov-Protopopov, 1634; Грамматика 'Grammar' by Meletiy Smotritsky, 1648; Арифметика, or 'Arithmetics' by Leonty Magnitsky, 1703, etc.). All in all, the Moscow Print Yard published 30 books (1000 copies each) between the late 16th and early 17th centuries. Proofreaders Andronik Timofeyev Nevezha and Ivan Andronikov Nevezha influenced the formation of a certain style of Moscow Cyrillic editions from the 17th century. Karion Istomin is known to have worked at the Print Yard first as a proofreader (from 1682) and then its inspector (1698–1701).

From 1703 to 1711, the Moscow Print Yard published the first Russian newspaper, Vedomosti. In 1710, proofreader Fedor Polikarpov-Orlov (future director of the publishing house from 1726 to 1731) presented a copy of the Alphabet (Азбука) with the pictures of ancient and contemporary Slavonic letters to Peter the Great. Between 1564 and 1711, the Moscow Print Yard published approximately 700 kinds of books (some of them, such as the Alphabet, reached 10,000 copies from 1657 to 1677). In 1721, the Print Yard was transferred under the authority of the Most Holy Synod, with its publishing house becoming Synodal. In the middle of the 18th century, they constructed the Baroque-style side housing together with the printing and library premises, which would close the perimeter of the yard (architects Ivan Fyodorovich Michurin and Dmitry Ukhtomsky). In the late 18th and early 19th centuries, the Print Yard building on Nikolskaya Street was dismantled and replaced with a monumental edifice for the Synodal Publishing House (1811–1815, architect Ivan Mironovsky). In the 19th century, the publishing house's buildings were perceived as a single architectural ensemble with the towers and walls of Kitai-gorod, with the extensions and alterations by future generation architects (Mikhail Chichagov, Nikolai Artleben, S. Slutsky and others).

The state monopoly on publishing continued until 1783 when some private publishing was permitted with great reluctance, although the state continued to exercise complete control through censorship. Some reforms occurred in 1861, but it was not until 1905 that greater freedom of the press was granted.
