= Lviv Dormition Brotherhood =

Religious organization

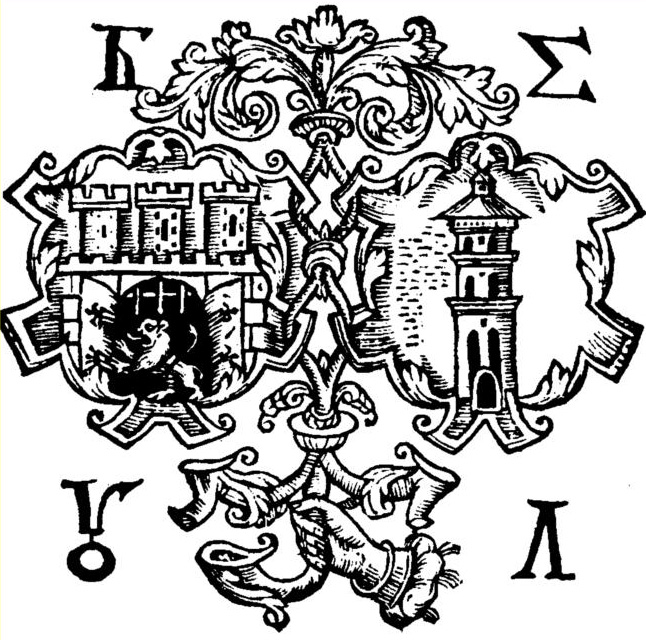
Typographic seal of Lviv Dormition Brotherhood

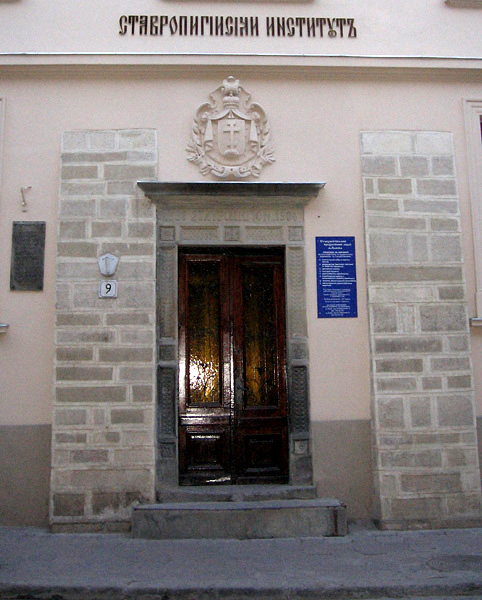
Lviv Dormition Brotherhood coat of arms at the entrance to Stauropegion Institute in Lviv

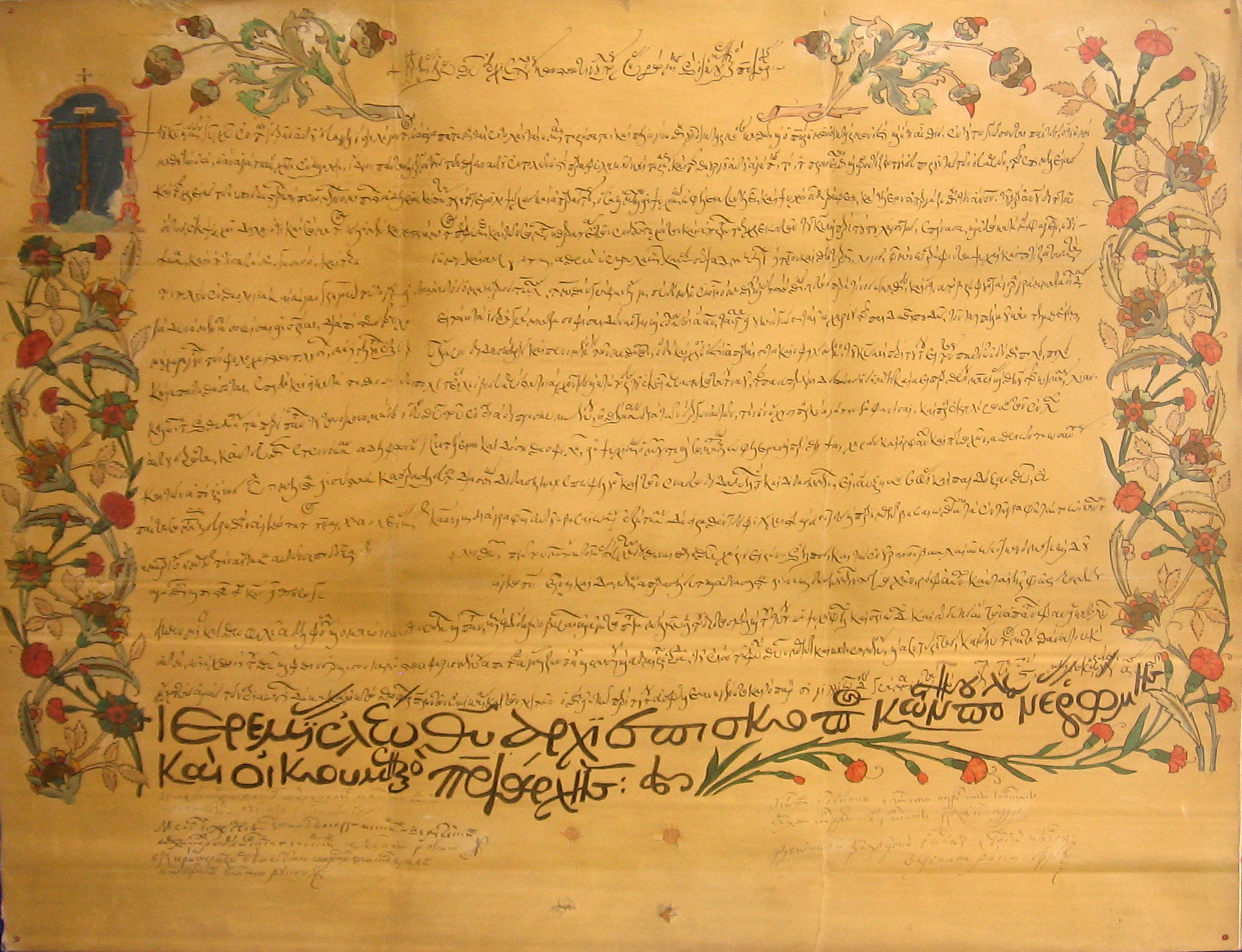
An epistle of the Patriarch of Constantinople confirming the stauropegion granted to the Lviv Orthodox Brotherhood

Lviv Dormition Brotherhood (Ukrainian: Львівське успенське братство) also known as Lviv Stauropegion Brotherhood was an influential religious organization associated with the Dormition Church in Lviv and one of the oldest Orthodox Brotherhood organizations. It was first an association of Orthodox and then, from 1708, also Greek Catholic burghers in Lviv. Like other brotherhoods in Ukraine, it was also a military force tasked with defending the Orthodox church and the faith, particularly against Polish and Latin influences.

== Overview ==
The organization possessed stauropegion rights and oversaw not only activities of its secular members, but also clergy and sometimes bishops. Members of any estate had a chance to join the brotherhood. Money contributed to the society were used to fund Monastery and church of St. Onuphrius and Dormition Church. With the help of the brotherhood, Lviv Orthodox eparchy which was liquidated by the Kingdom of Poland after annexation of Galicia (part of Galicia–Volhynia Wars) was revived in 1539.

Lviv Dormition Brotherhood had its own publishing house, operated hospitals, orphanages, elderly homes and provided other community services. It also founded a school in 1585 and campaigned against clerics who neglect their religious duties. It was also a military force that fought the Polish and Latin influences although it capitulated to the latter, subsequently joining Unia or the Eastern Catholic Churches in the eighteenth century.

The brotherhood's recorded organizational statute was approved by Patriarch of Antioch Joachim VI in 1586. In 1708 it finally accepted the Union of Brest. A script introduced by the brotherhood's printing house became a prototype for the new alphabet introduced in the Russian Empire.

Following the partitions of Poland, in 1788 the Austrian authorities liquidated the organizations which was reformed into the Stauropegion Institute.

In 1989 the Lviv Dormition Brotherhood was revived on the efforts of Volodymyr Yarema who at that time was a priest of the Moscow's Patriarchate Church of Peter and Paul. Since the fall of the Soviet Union, it is associated with the Ukrainian Autocephalous Orthodox Church.

== See also ==
- Monastery and church of St. Onuphrius, Lviv
- Ivan Fyodorov (printer), Konstanty Korniakt
