= Korniakt Palace =

16th-century palace in Lviv, Ukraine

Coordinates: 49°50′32″N 24°01′59″E

- Палац Корнякта
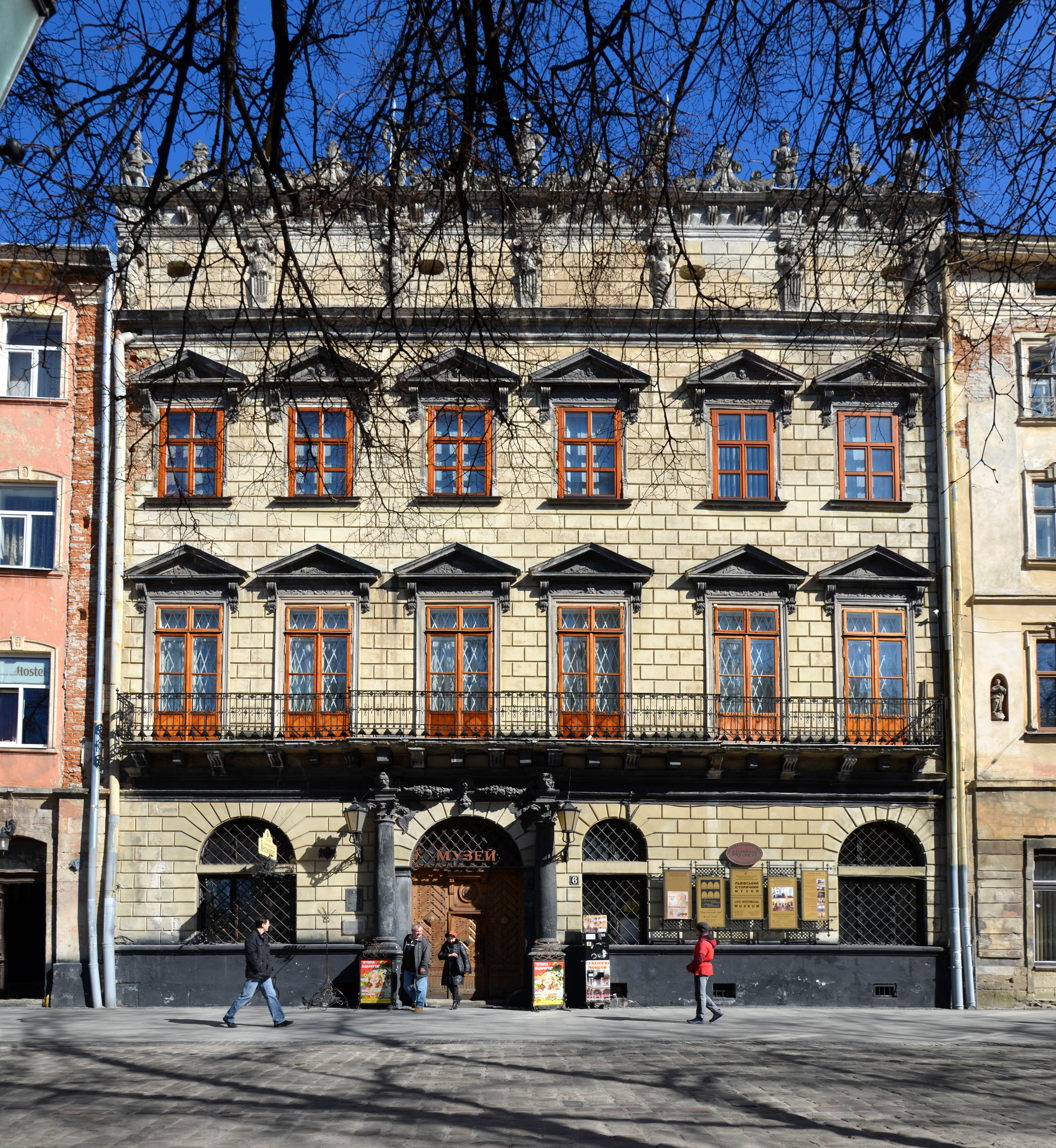
- Established: 1580
- Location: Rynkova Ploshcha 6, Lviv, Ukraine
- Architects: Pavlo Rimlyanin, Peter Barbon

The Korniakt Palace (Ukrainian: Палац Корнякта, romanized: Palats Korniakta; Polish: kamienica Królewska we Lwowie) on Market Square in Lviv is a prime example of the royal kamienica, or townhouse. The fabric of the palace is of various dates. It was originally built by Polish architect Piotr Barbon for merchant Konstanty Korniakt, a champion of Greek Orthodoxy and co-founder of the Lviv Dormition Brotherhood. Construction of this severely elegant Renaissance palazzo was completed in 1580.

After Korniakt's death in 1603, King Władysław IV Vasa stayed at his palace. He got smallpox and recovered here. The son of Korniakt sold the tenement house to the Discalced Carmelite monastery, from whom it was purchased in 1640 by Jakub Sobieski, the Voivode of Bełz. After his death and that of his wife, Teofila Sobieska née Daniłowicz, the tenement house was inherited by Jan Sobieski, the future king of Poland. The Polish-Lithuanian ruler remodelled it into a palatial residence, with spacious rooms and an audience hall where he signed the Eternal Peace Treaty of 1686.

The house remained in the possession of the Sobieski family until 1724, being inherited by Princes Aleksander and Konstanty. Its next owner was the Crown Field Hetman Stanisław Mateusz Rzewuski. At that time, he already owned several nearby tenement houses, which allowed him to create a large urban residence. The grandson of the purchaser, Józef Rzewuski, sold the tenement house in 1804 to Aleksander Chodkiewicz.

The next owner of the tenement house was Helena Ponińska, née Górska, a writer and social activist. She carried out numerous modifications and renovations of the building, with contributions from architects and artists such as Antoni Bauman, Jan Ziółkowski, and Joseph Engel. After her death, the house was inherited by her son Kalikst Poniński. Following his death in 1902, the property passed to the Lubomirski family, who sold it in 1908 to the city council of Lviv to be used as the National Museum of King Jan III. The building also housed the Historical Museum of the City of Lviv. Restoration and conservation work aimed at returning the building to its original appearance began immediately and continued until 1931, under the supervision of Wawrzyniec Dayczak.

It is now part of the Lviv History Museum. The royal chambers are used for exhibiting Rococo furniture and clocks, a collection of medallions, and precious silverware.

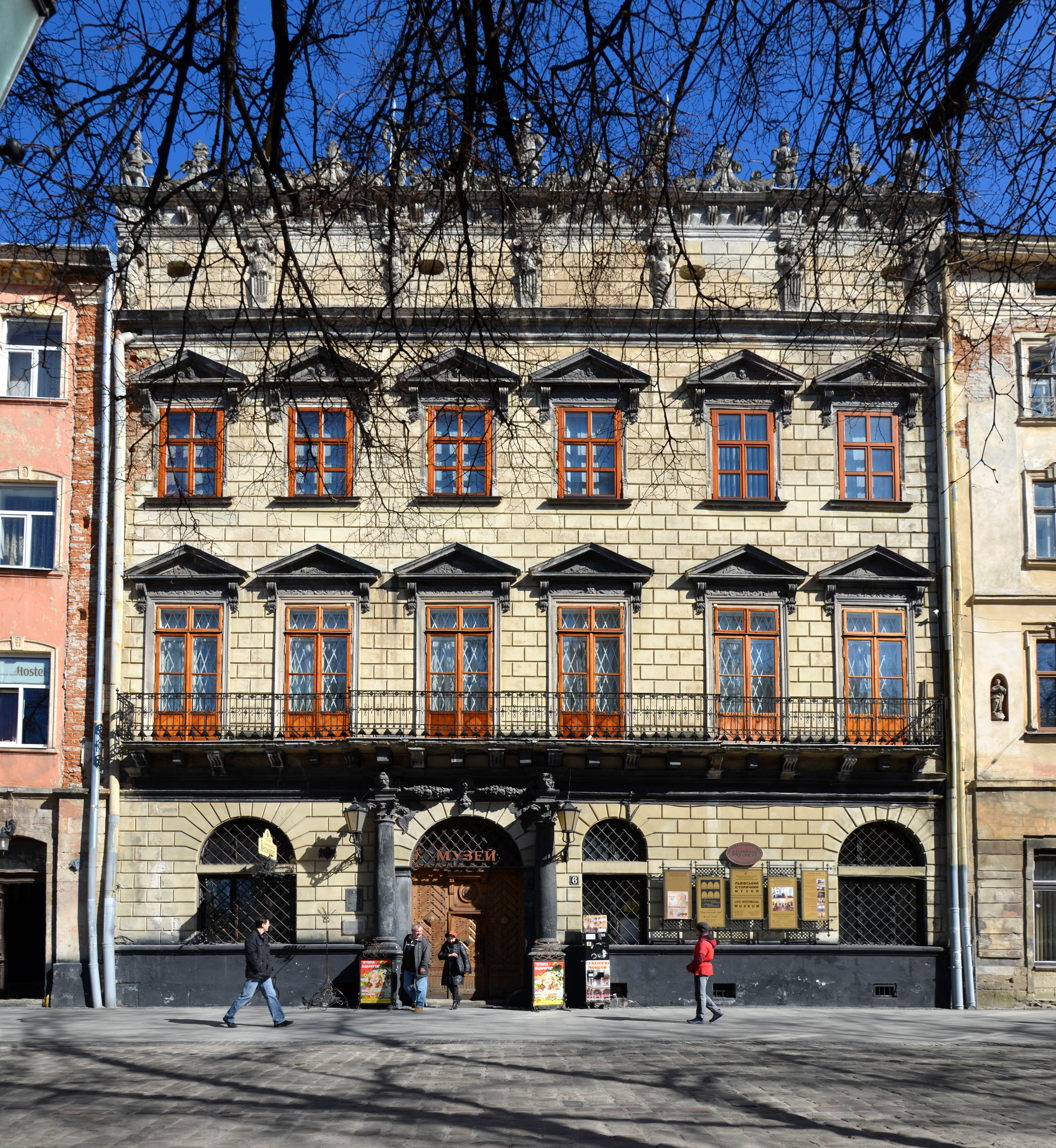
Jan Sobieski's residence in Lviv

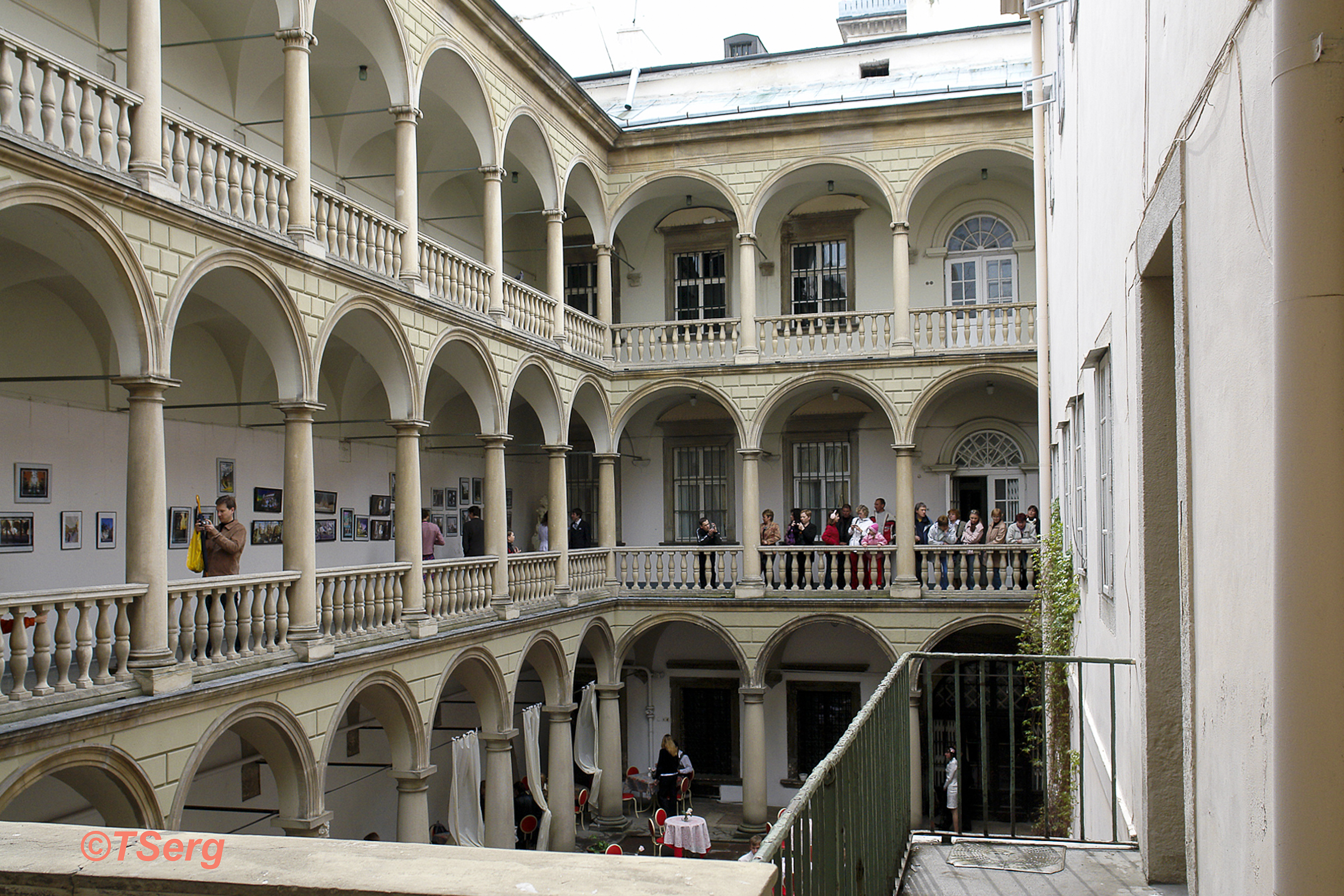
The Italian Courtyard

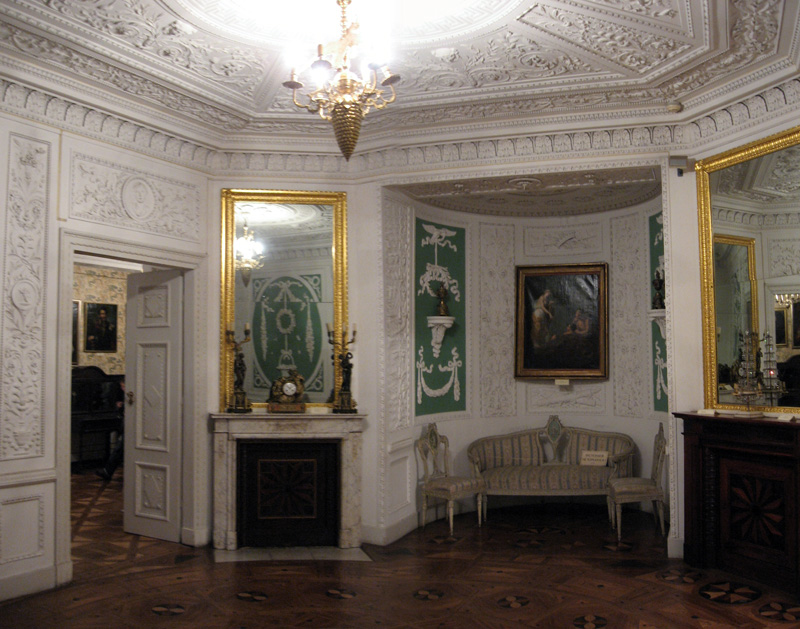
The audience hall

== See also ==
- Constantine Corniaktos
