= U ilysh =

Soviet Mari-language periodical

U ilysh, issue 1, 1926

U ilysh (Mari: У илыш, 'New Life') was a Mari-language monthly journal, published by the Central Bureau of the Mari Sections of the Central Committee of the Communist Party of the Soviet Union. It first appeared in 1922. The publication was initially issued from Kazan, but soon moved to Moscow. In January 1924 the editor A. K. Eshkinin left his post to take a new role in the Mari Autonomous Oblast, and a new editorial team of U ilysh consisting of G. I. Golubkin, V. E. Belsky and A. D. Kedrovoyz was created. Soon Apshat Maksi (Maxim Vasilovich Kuznetsov) was invited to join the team, and become the editor of the publication.

U ilysh had a circulation of 2,500 copies. The editorial office of U ilysh in Moscow was housed at 10, Nikolskaya Street. In 1927 U ilysh was replaced by the Moscow-based Mari publication Marii ial ('Mari village').
