= Dormition Church, Lviv =

Dormition (Wallachian) Church
- Church of the Assumption of the Blessed Virgin Mary
- The complex of the Dormition Church is dominated by the 450-year-old Korniakt Tower.
- Dormition (Wallachian) Church
- 49.8420°N 24.0344°E
- Location: Lviv, Ukraine
- Denomination: Orthodox Church of Ukraine

History
- Dedication: Assumption of the Blessed Virgin Mary

Architecture
- Architect: Paolo Romanus
- Style: Renaissance (Mannerism)
- Groundbreaking: 1591
- Completed: 1629

The Dormition or Assumption Church (Ukrainian: Успенська церква, Uspenska tserkva; historically known as the "Wallachian Church") is a Ukrainian Orthodox church in the city of Lviv, Ukraine. At present it belongs to the Lviv Diocese of the Orthodox Church of Ukraine.

== Description ==
The Church of the Assumption of the Blessed Virgin Mary in Lviv (commonly known as the Dormition church, or historically as the Wallachian Church) is a Ukrainian Orthodox Church in Lviv, located in the Old Town, in Renaissance style. The current building is built in place of a ruined church in the period 1591–1629 by Paulo Romanus, Wojciech Kapinos and Amvrosiy Prykhylny; the bell tower was erected in the years 1571–1578 by Piotr Barbon.

The Orthodox Church complex is located at vulytsia Ruska and consists of a church building, a bell tower (Korniakt Tower) and a chapel (chapel of the Three Saints).

The second church was erected on the initiative of the Lviv Brotherhood, and the founder of the bell tower and the chapel was Constantine Corniaktos, a Greek merchant. Korniakt's Tower is considered one of the most precious monuments of Ukrainian architecture of the sixteenth century Mannerism architectural style.

It was constructed in the late 16th and early 17th centuries with funds provided by the Greek merchant Constantine Corniaktos and other members of the Lviv Dormition Brotherhood, a local bratstvo which also operated an Orthodox school and press. The work was supported by many others, such as Hetman Petro Konashevych-Sahaidachny, Moldavian hospodars Ieremia Movilă and Simion Movilă, and even the Russian Tsar Feodor I. Simion Movilă's son, Peter Mogila, became the Metropolitan of Kiev, Halych and All-Rus' from 1633 until his death, and later was canonized as a saint in the Orthodox churches of Romania, Ukraine, and Poland. A memorial plaque to Peter Mogila is affixed to an outer wall of the church.

The church's architecture bears the mark of the Renaissance. This especially applies to the profusely decorated façade of the adjacent Chapel of the Three Hierarchs, built between 1574 and 1591 to Piotr Krasowski's designs.

Nearby is one of Lviv's most conspicuous landmarks, the Korniakt Tower, which was carried to its present height of 65 metres (213 feet) after a fire in 1695. This ornate bell-tower was originally commissioned by Corniaktos from architect Piotr Barbon in the 1570s.

== Previous buildings ==
=== First church ===
The church existed at that location before the 1340 conquest of the Great Duchy of Galicia and Volhynia by the Kingdom of Poland. It was then called the Church of Three Saints.

=== Second church ===
In the years 1547–1571, a church was built during 1547–1549 with money donated by Moldavian hospodar Alexandru Lăpușneanu and princess consort Ruxandra Lăpușneanu, which left a permanent mark in its name: Church of Wallachia. Little is known about the appearance of the church at that time. It had a buttressed facade, three turrets with cupolas, and mural paintings in the interior. Peter from Lugano, known as the Italian, led the construction. In 1568 master builder Felix began construction of the tower and work will continue under Peter Krassowski. In 1570, some of the towers collapsed, and in the next year a fire burned down the whole church.

The Orthodox church was closed down by the Lviv Archbishop Jan Dymitr Solikowski.

== See also ==
- Korniakt Tower
- Chapel of the Three Hierarchs
- Constantine Corniaktos
- St. Paraskeva Church, Lviv
- 17th-century Western domes
