= Acts and Epistles of the Apostles =

1564 book by Ivan Fyodorov

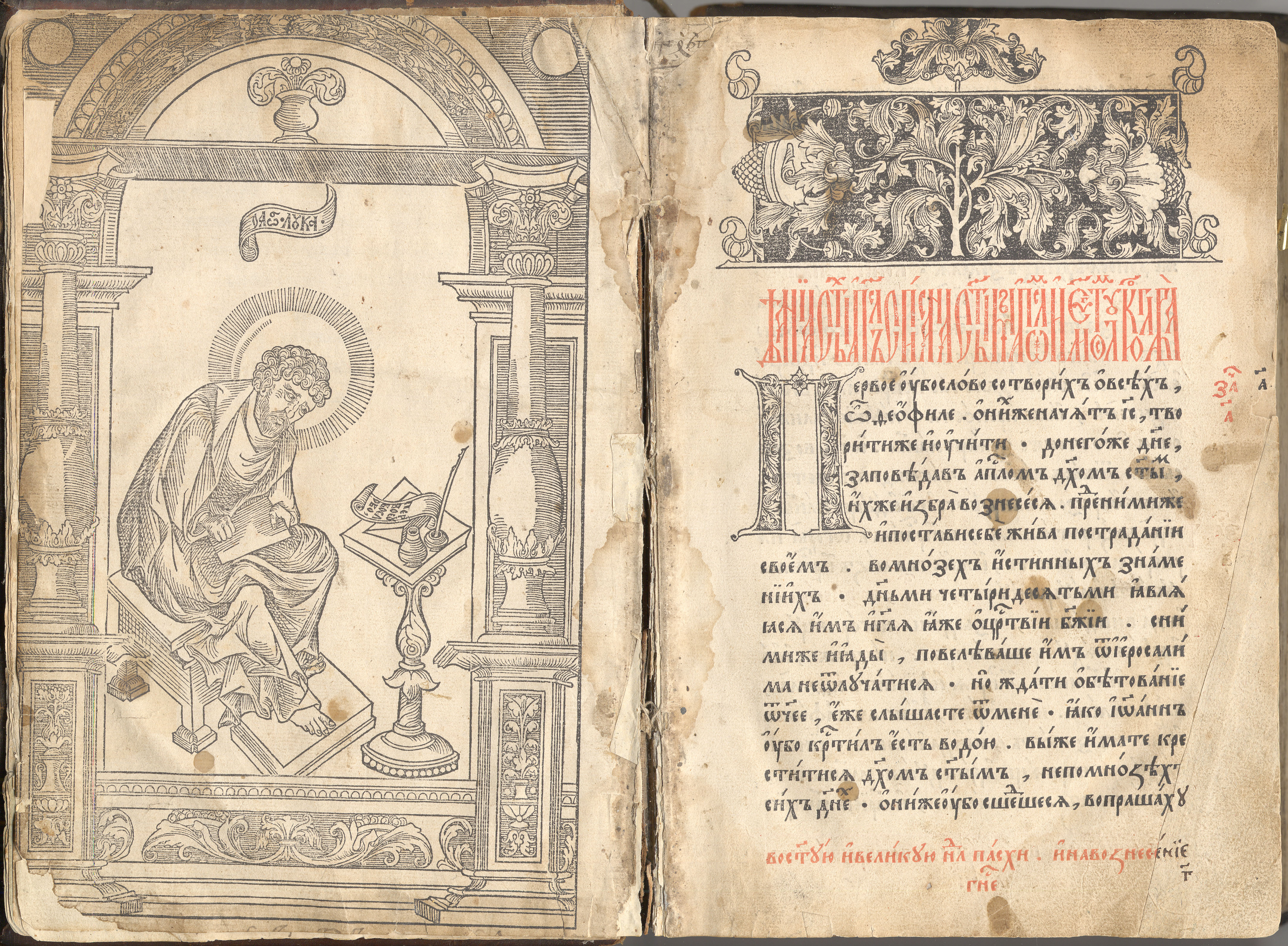
Frontispiece and title page

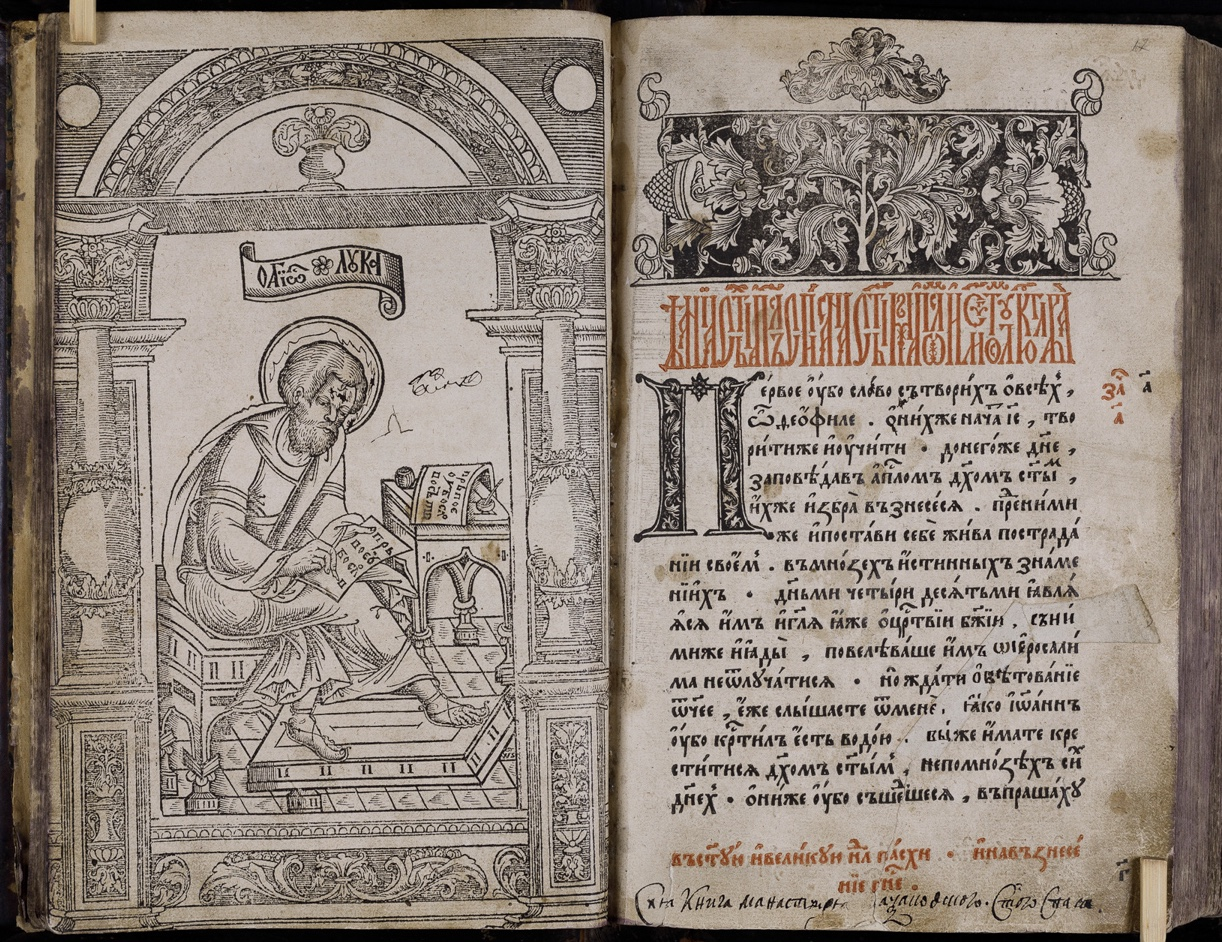
1574 edition of the Apostle published in Lviv.

The Acts and Epistles of the Apostles, (Note: Russian: Деяния святых апостолов.) also known as the Moscow Apostle, (Note: Russian: Московский Апостол.) or simply the Apostle, (Note: Russian: Апостол.) completed in 1564, is the first Russian printed publication that has an exact date. It was published by Ivan Fyodorov in Moscow.

It includes a short history of the origins of the Moscow Print Yard, written by the printer. The work on the "Apostle" began on 19 April 1563 and finished on 1 March 1564.

It was published at the Moscow Print Yard and written in the liturgical language of the Russian Orthodox Church. Ivan Fyodorov was one of the first printers in the East Slavic region, publishing liturgical works using movable type. The "Apostle" was widely used by the Russian Orthodox Church and about 120 copies are known to exist, of which five are in the Vernadsky National Library of Ukraine.

It is notable for containing the only contemporary portrait of Ivan IV of Russia.

== See also ==
- Apostolos (Orthodox liturgy)

== Sources ==
- Lytvynenko, Viacheslav V.; Shpakovsky, Mikhail V. (13 March 2023). Zinoviy Otenskiy and the Trinitarian Controversy in Sixteenth-Century Russia: Introduction, Texts, and Translation. BRILL. ISBN 978-90-04-53805-4.
- Stone, Jonathan (2013). Historical Dictionary of Russian Literature. Rowman & Littlefield. p. xix. ISBN 978-0-8108-7182-3.
