= Krucina coat of arms =

Polish coat of arms

Krucina
- Battle cry: none
- Alternative name(s): Krucini, Kruciny
- Earliest mention: 1571 (record)
- Cities: none
- Families: Korniakt

Krucina is a Polish coat of arms. It was used by the Korniakt family (szlachta) in the Polish–Lithuanian Commonwealth.

== History ==
Granted on February 12, 1571 to Konstanty Korniakt of Crete, a Greek born merchant based in Lwów. The name of the crest comes from the nickname Kruszyna (a mite).

== Related coat of arms ==
- Krucini (Krzyż III)

== See also ==
- Polish heraldry
- Heraldic family
- List of Polish nobility coats of arms

== Bibliography ==
- Tadeusz Gajl: Herbarz polski od średniowiecza do XX wieku : ponad 4500 herbów szlacheckich 37 tysięcy nazwisk 55 tysięcy rodów. L&L, 2007. ISBN 978-83-60597-10-1.
