= Kyrylo Stavrovetsky =

Kyrylo Stavrovetsky-Tranquillon (died 1646) was a Ruthenian (Ukrainian) church figure of the Polish–Lithuanian Commonwealth, poet, publisher, archimandrite of the Yelets Dormition Monastery in Chernihiv. He is better known for his publishing efforts which provided Ruthenian citizens of the Commonwealth with literature in native language.

== Biography ==
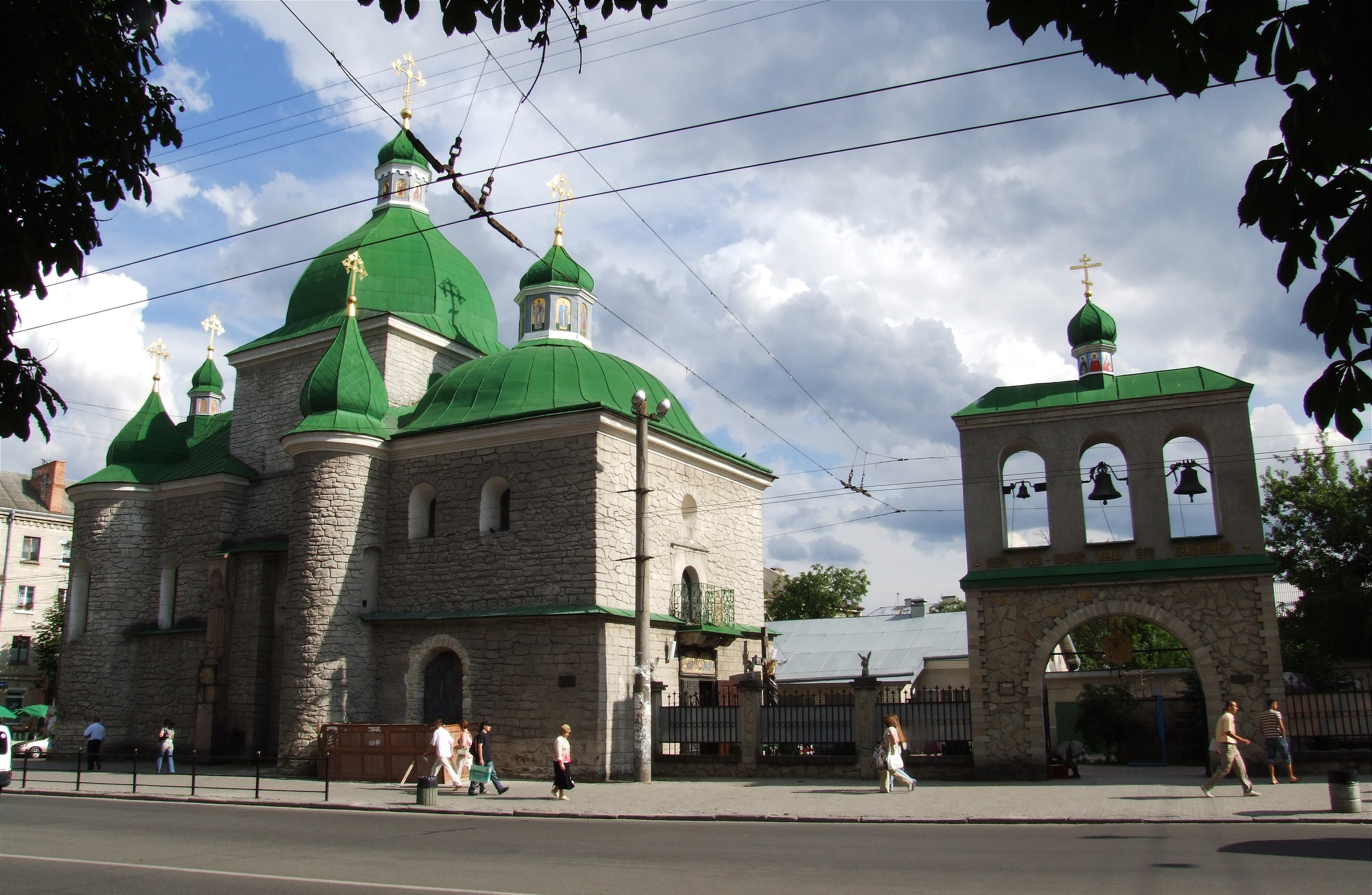
Nativity Church in Ternopil

It is not known when Stavrovetsky was born. Sometime at the end of 1580s he taught at the Lviv Brotherhood School, after which in 1592 Stavrovetsky moved to Ostrog and Wilno due to persecutions against bishop Hedeon Balaban. In December 1592 along with Ternopil brethren, he vouched for the Lviv Brotherhood in front of Jeremias II of Constantinople. The fact is reflected in inscription over the entrance of the Ternopil Nativity Church.

In 1618 Stavrovetsky returned to Pochaiv and for a brief time was hegumen at the small Univ Dormition Monastery (1618). Later he was a hegumen (1618–19) at the Lubartow Monastery near Lublin. In 1621-25 Stavrovetsky was a preacher in Zamość. In 1626 he adopted the Union of Brest and from 1628 to his death he was an archimandrite of Yelets Dormition Monastery.

== Known publications ==
- 1618 Mirror of Theology (Zertsalo bohosloviia) - presenting Stavrovetsky's attempt to present the Christian dogma without being subjected to censorship, the book was published at the author's own expense in Volhynia
- 1619 Didactic gospel (Uchytelni yevanheliia)
  - In 1620s the congress of Ukrainian Orthodox bishops headed by the Exarch of Ukraine Iov Boretsky condemned the book, while in 1627 the Moscow church authorities ordered that it be burnt.
- 1646 Priceless Perl (Perlo mnohotsinnoie)
