= Anonymous Bulgarian Chronicle =

Anonymous Bulgarian Chronicle is a term used for several anonymous chronicles written in Bulgaria during the Middle Ages.

== 11th/12th centuries ==
The term is used when referring to an apocryphal apocalyptic chronicle written in Bulgaria in the late eleventh or early twelfth century. This work is also known as the "apocryphal Bulgarian chronicle".

Such chronicles were relatively common in Bulgaria and Byzantium of that period, and their defining characteristic was that they purported to come from a prophet, delivering God's message and announcing that the Apocalypse is near.

== 15th century ==
Several sources refer to an early 15th-century work of that name.

According to Khristov this work is focused on the Ottoman invasion of the Balkans. Imber, however, is more critical of its coverage of that time period. According to him that work provides a narrative from 1296 to the death of Sultan Bayezid I in 1403 and only has a few brief and rather inaccurate entries focusing on the Ottoman civil war. This work has been identified it as one of the two important Slavonic literary histories for that time and place. Due to the relatively undescriptive name, it is possible that Khristov and Imber discuss two different works.

Göyünç, Kreiser and Neumann discuss the work of that name noting that it reaches the year 1417 and that has been "identified as an Old-Bulgarian translation of the Byzantine chronicle of John Chortasmenos. Another work uses this term to refer to a chronicle covering years 1296–1413. For the reasons mentioned above, it is not certain whether the scholars in question are discussing a single chronicle, ending in the early 15th century, or several different ones.

== See also ==
- Medieval Bulgarian literature
