= Leksikon vokabulam novym po alfavitu =

The Leksikon vokabulam novym po alfavitu (Russian: Лексикон вокабулам новым по алфавиту) is a Russian dictionary of foreign words written (but not published) during Peter the Great's reign, possibly ordered by him. It is now attributed to Fedor Polikarpov-Orlov and dated to 1715, with its compilation connected to a historical treaty by the same author.

It consists of 503 foreign words that should be settled in the Russian vocabulary. Most of the words have now their space in the Russian language. For most foreign words a definition in Russian is provided, others have Russian synonyms. The types of word vary from art of war (e.g. армея armeya 'army', авангардиа avangardia 'vanguard') to everyday words (e.g. интерес interes 'interest', люстра lyustra 'chandelier', пардон pardon 'sorry'). The dictionary appears to have been edited by Peter the Great himself.
