= Didactic gospels =

Collection of sermons

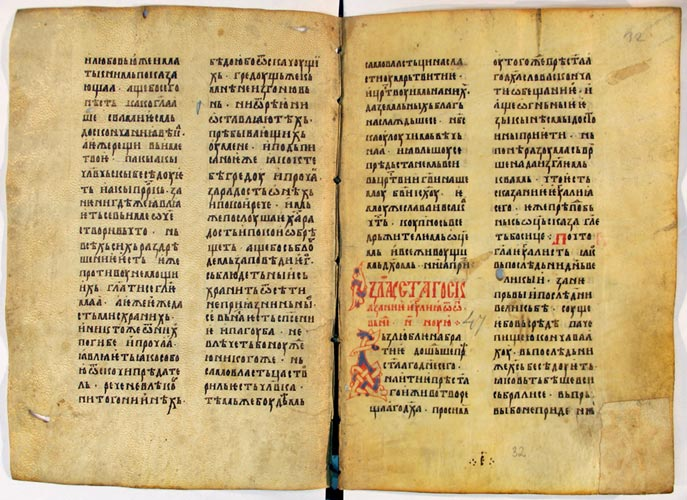
Page of "Didactic Gospel", from Constantine of Preslav, Dragoman

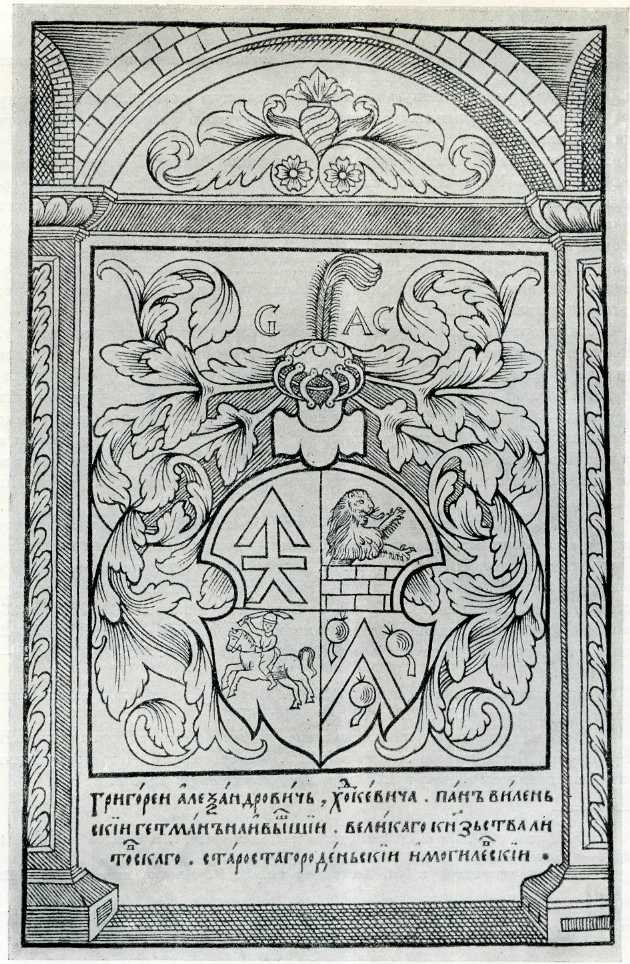
Front cover of "Didactic gospel" published by Ivan Fyodorov in Zabłudów

Didactic gospels is a collection of sermons. Their prototype is considered the didactic of Bishop Constantine of Preslav in 894 written in the Church Slavonic language.

== List of known published gospels ==
- 1569 Published in Zabłudów by Ivan Fyodorov and Pyotr Mstislavets
- 1595 Published in Vilno
- 1606 Published in Krylos by Pamvo Berynda
- 1619 Published in the Regina Wisniowiecka estate near Rokhmaniv, Volhynian Voivodeship by Kyrylo Stavrovetsky
  - In 1622 on the decree of Tsar Michael I of Russia all copies of the gospel were ordered to be burned (Chronology of Ukrainian language bans).
- 1637 Published by Kiev Pechersk Lavra
- 1637 Published by Vasiliy Burtsov-Protopopov
- 1680 Published in Vilno by Vasiliy Garaburda
- 1696 Published in Univ Lavra by Kyrylo Stavrovetsky
- 1697 Published in Univ Lavra by Kyrylo Stavrovetsky
- 1697 Published by Mogilev Fraternity (Brotherhood)
