= Ivan Fyodorov (printer) =

Russian printer (1510/25-1583)

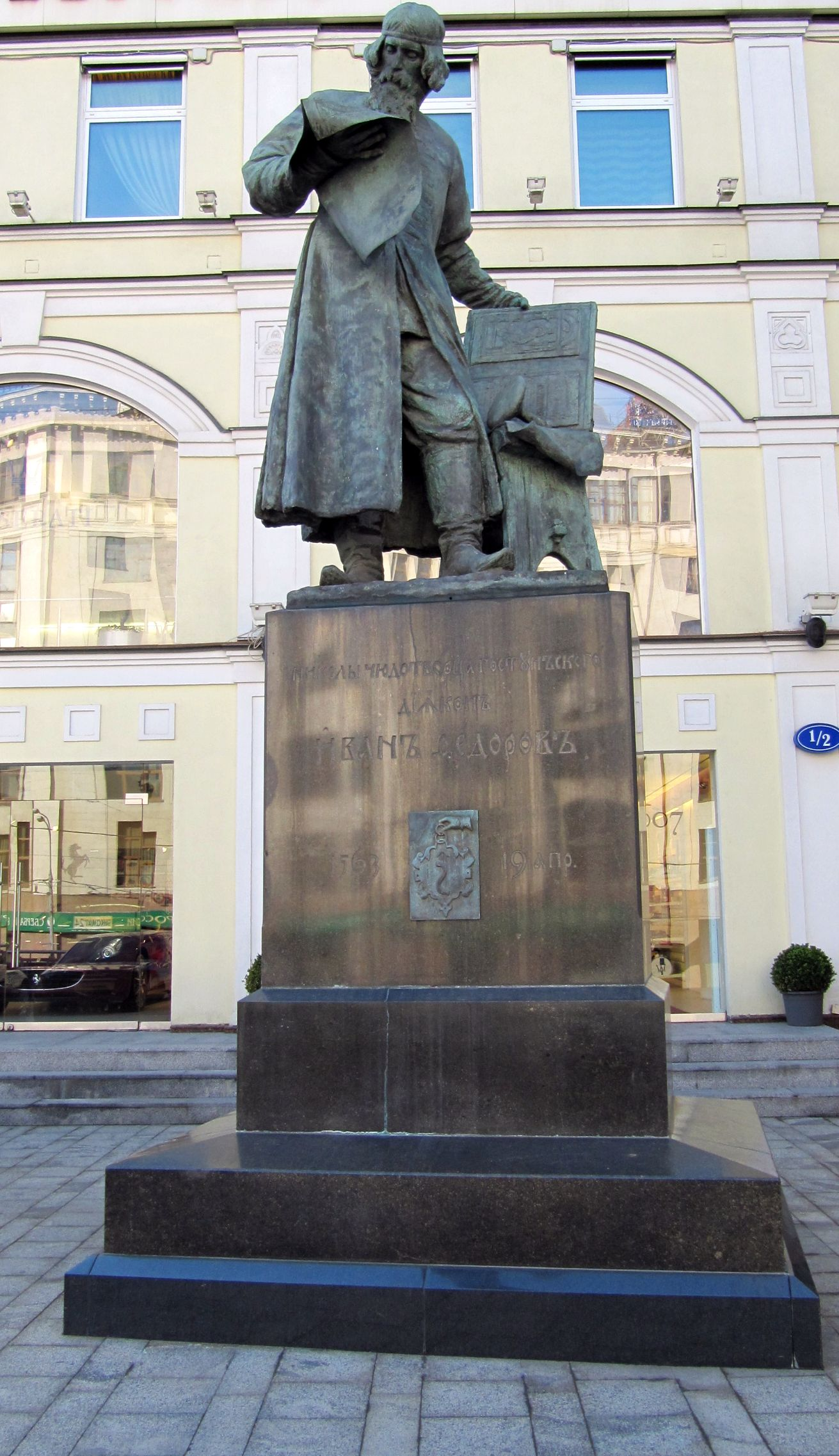
- The first monument to Fyodorov was unveiled in front of the Moscow Print Yard in 1909
- Born: c. 1510–1525; Grand Duchy of Moscow
- Died: 16 December 1583; Lviv, Polish–Lithuanian Commonwealth
- Occupations: Inventor; craftsman
- Known for: first Russian printer

Ivan Fyodorov or Ivan Fеdorov (Russian: Ива́н Фёдоров; Ukrainian: Іван Федоров or Федорович; born c. 1510 or c. 1525 – died December 16, 1583) sometimes transliterated as Fiodorov, was one of the fathers of Eastern Slavonic printing (along with Schweipolt Fiol and Francysk Skaryna). He was also a skilled cannon maker and the inventor of a multibarreled mortar. Fyodorov was forced out of Moscow because of his attempts to employ the “blasphemous” new printing techniques, and found refuge in Poland–Lithuania, first in Zabłudów, then most notably in Ostroh, where he was instrumental in the publication of the Ostrog Bible.

== Name ==
In those times Russians still did not have hereditary surnames, but used patronymics or nicknames, which were also not stable. In his first book "Apostolos" (printed in Moscow in 1564) he called himself in typical Russian style Ivan Fedorov that is "Ivan, son of Fedor". In his other famous book "Ostrog Bible" (1581) he called himself in both Church Slavonic and Greek as "Ivan, son of Feodor (Феодоров сын, Θεοδώρου υἱός), a printer from Moscow". In the Greek version there was "from Great Russia" instead of "from Moscow". But when he was living for a long time in the Polish–Lithuanian Commonwealth, he adopted a local Ruthenian style patronymic in Polish spelling "Fedorowicz" and also added a nickname indicating his origin. In his Latin documents he signed Johannes Theodori Moscus (that is "a Muscovite"), or Ioannes Fedorowicz Moschus, typographus Græcus et Sclavonicus. As a result of the dialectal replacement of consonant /f/ with /x~xw/ in early East Slavic the first letter F was sometimes changed, so the patronymic became Chwedorowicz or Chodorowicz. In his later Slavonic books (printed in PLC) he signed "Ioann (Ivan) Fe(o)dorovich" (with some orthographic differences), and added a nickname "a Muscovite printer" or just simply "a Muscovite".

== Biography ==
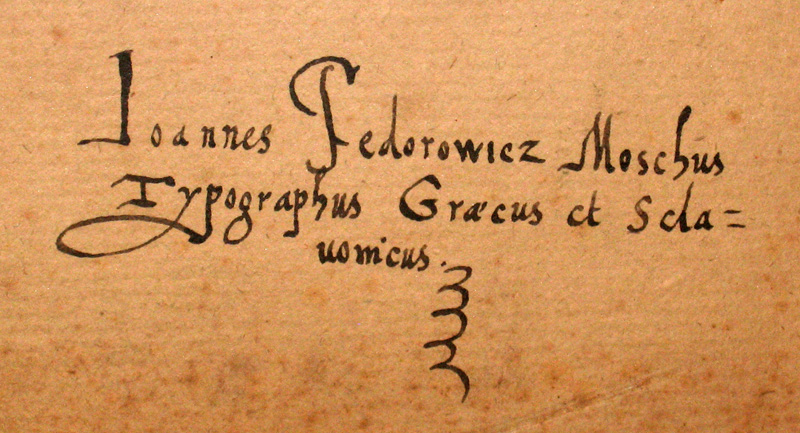
Fyodorov's autograph from July 23, 1583

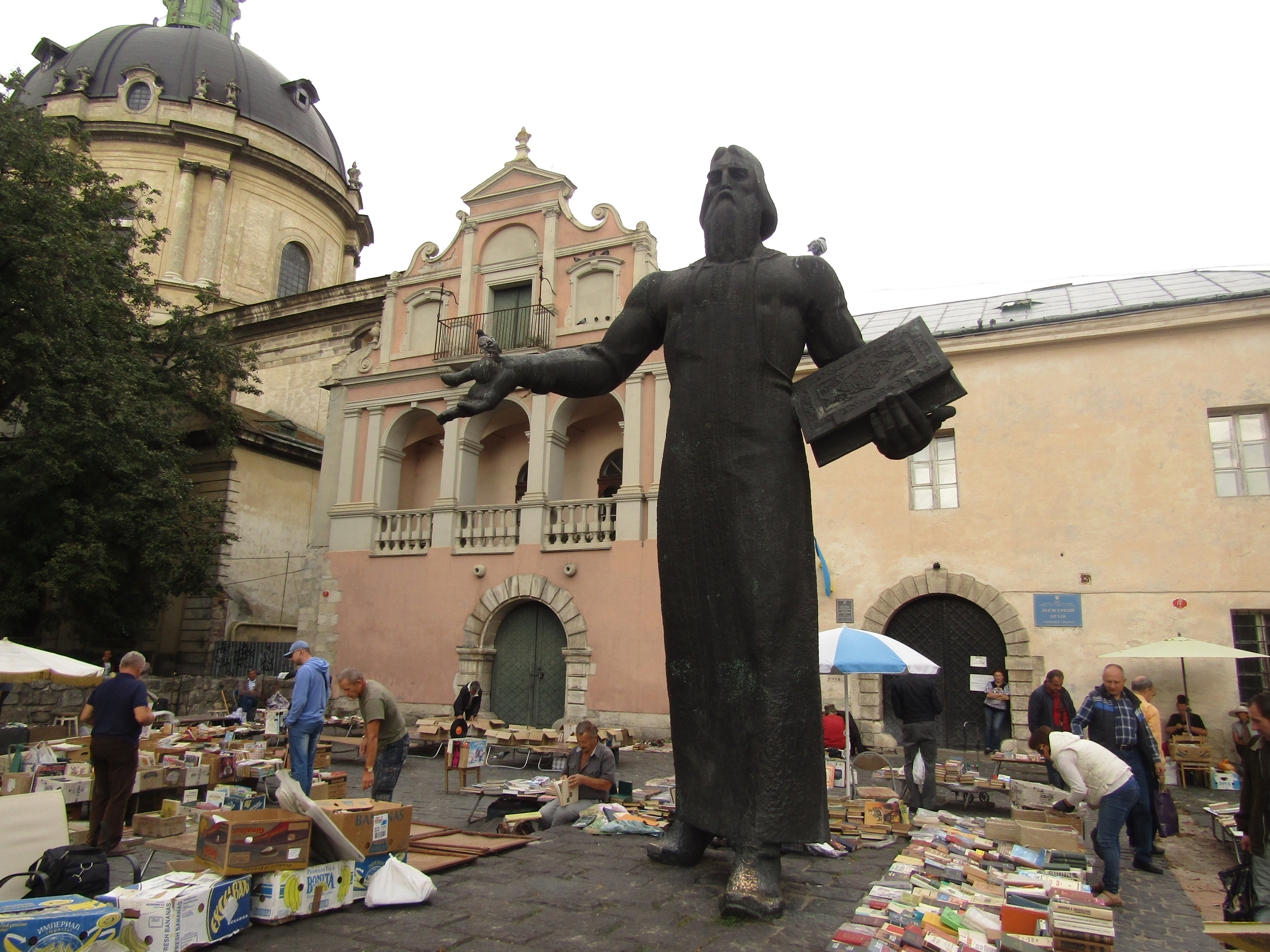
Monument to Ivan Fedorov in Lviv

Neither his place nor his date of birth are known. It is assumed that he was born c. 1510 or c. 1525, most likely in Moscow during the Grand Duchy period - he called himself a Muscovite even after his move to the Grand Duchy of Lithuania, and in his afterword to the Lviv edition of Apostle he named Moscow "our home, our fatherland and our kin". In 1935 a Russian historian of heraldry, Vladislav Kreskent'evich Lukomsky, advanced the hypothesis that his printer's mark was the coat of arms of Rahoza, a Belarusian szlachta family, and that Fyodorov had a connection with that family either by descent or by adoption. No subsequent researchers have accepted that theory other than Nemirovsky (2002), who agreed only with the possibility of adoption but not with the theory of Fyodorov's descent from the szlachta.

Fyodorov graduated from the University of Kraków in 1532 with a bachelor's degree.

In 1564–5 Fedorov accepted an appointment as a deacon in the church of Saint Nicolas (Gostunsky) in the Moscow Kremlin. Together with Pyotr Timofeev from Mstislavl (i.e. Mstislavets), he established the Moscow Print Yard and published a number of liturgical works in Church Slavonic using moveable type. This technical innovation created competition for the Muscovite scribes, who began to persecute Fyodorov and Mstislavets, finally forcing them to flee to the Grand Duchy of Lithuania after their printing workshop had been burned down (an alleged arson, as related by Giles Fletcher in 1591). (Note: However, modern scholars cast doubt on Fletcher's claim of arson, believing that his account referred to some printing shop other than Fyodorov's)

The printers were received by the Great Lithuanian Hetman Hrehory Chodkiewicz at his estate in Zabłudów (northern Podlaskie), where they published Yevangeliye uchitel’noye (Didactic Gospel, 1569) (see Zabłudów Gospel) and Psaltir’ (Psalter, 1570).

Fyodorov moved to Lviv in 1572 and resumed his work as a printer the following year at the Saint Onuphrius Monastery. (Fyodorov's tombstone in Lviv is inscribed with the phrase "renewed neglected printing".) In 1574 Fyodorov, with the help of his son and Hryn Ivanovych of Zabłudów published the second edition of the Apostolos (Apostle, previously published by him in Moscow), with an autobiographical epilogue, and an Azbuka (Alphabet book).

In 1575 Fyodorov, now in the service of Prince Konstanty Wasyl Ostrogski, was placed in charge of the Derman Monastery near Dubno; in 1577–9 he established the Ostrog Press, where, in 1581, he published the Ostrog Bible — the first full version of the Bible in Church Slavonic printed in moveable type — as well as a number of other books. Fyodorov returned to Lviv after a quarrel with Prince Konstantyn Ostrogski, but his attempt to reopen his printing shop was unsuccessful. His printing facilities became the property of the Lviv Dormition Brotherhood (later the Stauropegion Institute). The brotherhood used Fyodorov's original designs until the early 19th century.

In 1583 he visited Vienna and Kraków, where he showed the Emperor his latest inventions. He then returned to Lviv, where he died on December 16, 1583; he was buried there on the grounds of the Saint Onuphrius Monastery.

== Publications ==
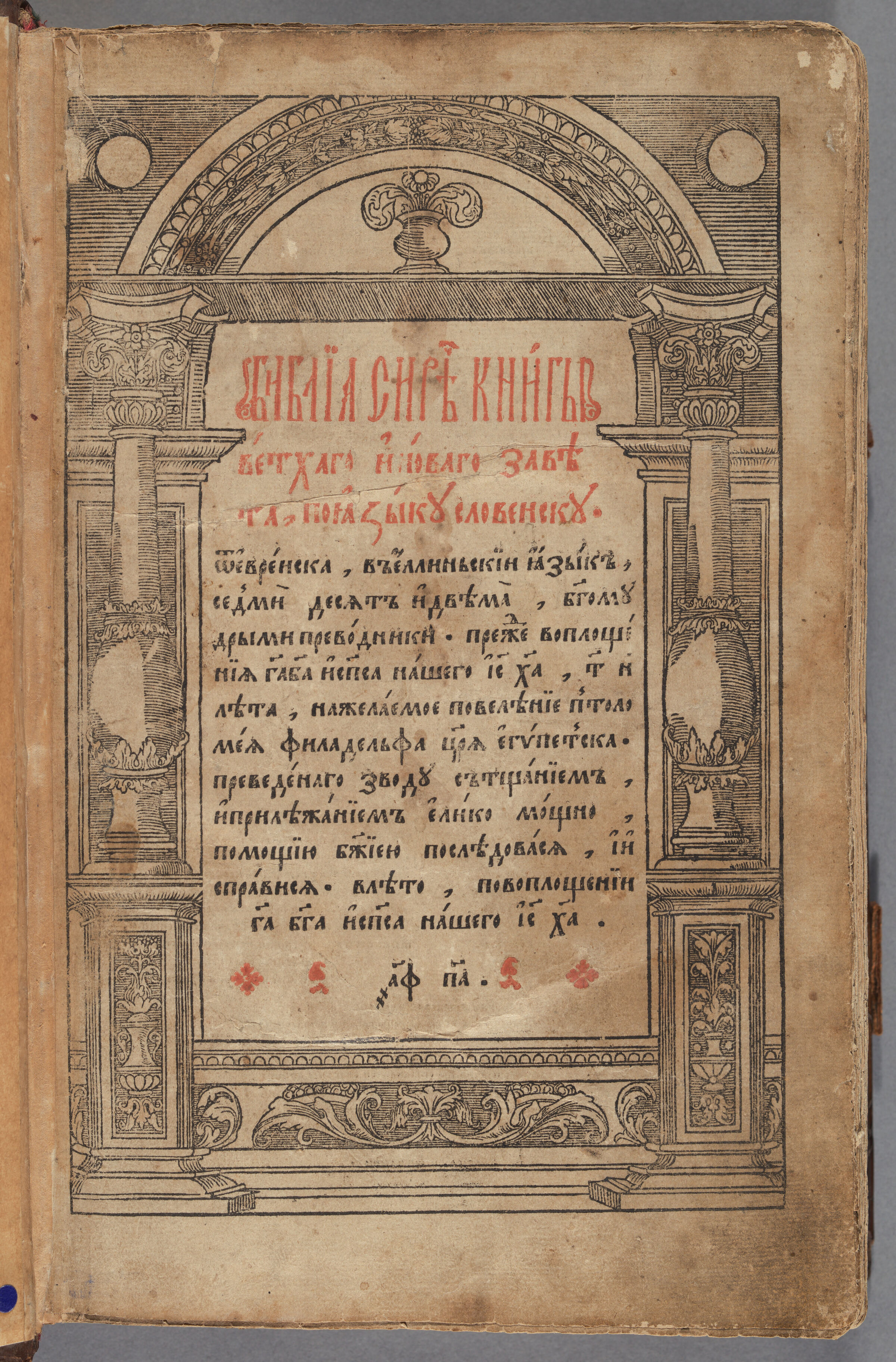
Title page from the Ostrog Bible, 1581

1. Apostolos (Apostol). Moscow, 17 April 1563 – 3 March 1564, 6 unnumbered and 262 numbered leaves (in Cyrillic numerals) sized at least 285 x 193 mm, in two colours, edition of about 1,000 copies of which at least 47 copies are extant.

2 and 3. Two editions of Book of Hours (Chasovnic). Moscow, 7 August – 29 September 1565 and 2 September – 29 October 1565, 173 (172 in the second edition) unnumbered leaves sized at least 166 x 118 mm, printed in two colours, at least 7 copies are extant today.

4. Didactic Gospel (Yevangeliye uchitelnoye). Zabłudów, 8 July 1568 – 17 March 1569, 8 unnumbered and 399 numbered leaves sized at least 310 x 194 mm, printed in two colours, at least 31 copies are extant today.

5. Psalms with Book of Hours. Zabłudów, 26 September 1569 – 23 March 1570, 18 unnumbered leaves with two separately numbered sets of 284 and 75 leaves sized at least 168 x 130 mm (a heavily cropped copy), printed in two colours. A very rare edition: only three extant copies are known, all of them incomplete. The first Cyrillic book with ruled tables. A digital version is available.

6. Apostolos. Lvov, 25 February 1573 – 15 February 1574, 15 unnumbered and 264 numbered leaves sized at least 300 x 195 mm, printed in two colours, edition of 1,000–1,200 copies, at least 70 copies are extant today. Similar to the Moscow edition of 1564 with a little more refined design, a preface and a new afterword. PDF available

7. Primer. Lviv, 1574, 40 unnumbered leaves, frame (type page) of 127,5 x 63 mm, printed in two colours, edition of probably 2,000 copies, but only a single one is known to have survived (stored in the library of Harvard University).

8. Greek-Russian Church-Slavonic Reader. Ostrog, 1578, 8 unnumbered leaves, frame of 127,5 x 64 mm, printed in one colour, set in two columns (parallel Greek and Slavonic text) for the first time in Fyodorov's books, only one copy is in existence (stored in the State Library of Gotha, East Germany). This copy is bound with a copy of the Primer of 1578 (see below), which makes them appear as one book referred to as Ostrog Primer of 1578. A digital version is available online.

9. Primer. Ostrog, 1578, 48 unnumbered leaves, frame of 127,5 x 63 mm, printed in one colour, the edition was of many copies, but only two incomplete copies exist (one is already mentioned above, the other one is kept in the Royal Library of Copenhagen). A reprint of the Lviv's Primer of 1574 with the added "On the Letters" by Chernorizets Hrabar. A digital version is available online.

10. New Testament with Psalms. Ostrog, 1580, 4 unnumbered + 480 numbered leaves sized at least 152 x 87 mm, printed in two colours, the number of copies is unknown, at least 47 copies are extant.

11. Alphabetical index to the previous edition ("Knizhka, sobraniye veschey ..."). Ostrog, 1580, 1 unnumbered and 52 numbered leaves, frame of 122 x 55 mm, printed in one colour, at least 13 copies are extant (often added to the previous book, but evidently printed and issued separately as a special edition).

12. Chronology of Andrew Rymsha ("Kotorogo sya m(s)tsa shto za starykh věkov děyelo korotkoye opisaniye"). Ostrog, 5 May 1581, two-page leaflet (text printed on the inside of the pages), frame of about 175 x 65 mm. The only known copy is stored in the Saltykov-Shchedrin State Public Library in St.Petersburg.

13. Bible. Ostrog, 1581. 8 unnumbered leaves with five separately numbered sets of 276, 180, 30, 56 and 78 leaves sized at least 309 x 202 mm, text set in two columns, including some in Greek, mainly printed in one colour (vermilion is used only for the title), edition of 1,500 copies of which approximately 400 are extant.

== See also ==
- Moscow Print Yard
- Printing in Ukraine
