= Fedor Polikarpov-Orlov =

Russian writer, translator, and printer (1660-1731)

Fedor Polikarpov-Orlov (Russian: Фёдор Поликарпович Поликарпов-Орлов; c. 1660 – 12 January 1731) was a Russian writer, translator, and printer. He is most noted for his Slavonic Bukvar (Primer) that was widely used by Slavic-speakers (Poles, Ruthenians, Czechs, Slovaks, Serbs, Bulgars) both in Europe and throughout the Russian Empire. The historic significance of the 1701 Primer as a sample of book-printing trade lies in the fact that it was the first time in the history of Moscow book-printing that it was attempted to teach students the elements of not only one language but of three at the same time: Slavic, Greek and Latin.

Polikarpov-Orlov graduated from the Slavic Greek Latin Academy in his birthplace of Moscow and later taught grammar, rhetoric, and poetic theory at the same academy. Between 1698 and 1722 he was first a proofreader at the Pechatnyi Dvor (Moscow Print Yard) and then he became the printshop director. From 1726 to 1731 he was director of the Synodal Printing House in Moscow. Polikarpov-Orlov's best-known work – Slavonic-Greek-Latin Primer (1701) and the Slavonic-Greek-Latin Lexicon (1704) – are the most important monuments of East Slavonic lexicography and history and sources of trilingual elementary education in Russia and Eastern Europe, especially among the Serbs in the 1700s. His other works include Historical Information on the Moscow Academy (1726), an appendix to The Grammar Book of Meletius Smotrytsky (1721), and the first essay on the history of Russian printing. He also helped edit the first Russian newspaper, Sankt-Peterburgskie Vedomosti. Among the best known works translated by Polikarpov-Orlov is the 1650 Geography of Bernhardus Varenius (Geographia Generalis).

== See also ==
- Leksikon vokabulam novym po alfavitu
