= Apostolos (Eastern Orthodox liturgy) =

Texts used in Eastern Orthodox liturgy

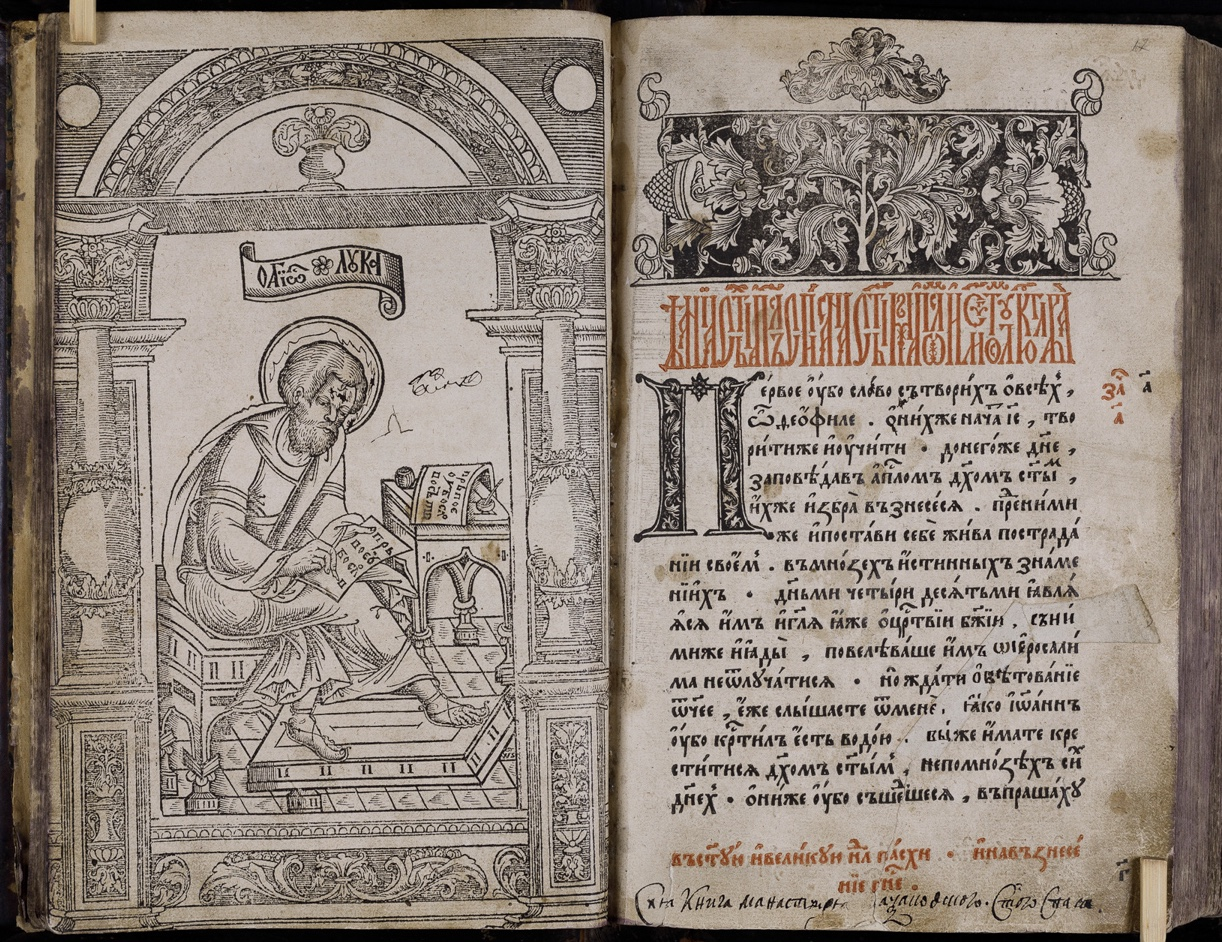
1574 edition of Ivan Fyodorov's Apostolos published in Lviv.

In Eastern Orthodox liturgy, the Apostolos is a book containing texts traditionally believed to be authored by one of the twelve apostles (disciples) – various epistles and the Acts of the Apostles – from which one is selected to be read during service. The Apostolos is the reading that precedes the Gospel Reading.

The term is also used for the reading of the selected text.

One example of this book is Ivan Fyodorov's Apostolos published in Moscow in 1564.

== See also ==
- Lectionary
