= Monastery and church of St. Onuphrius, Lviv =

Greek Catholic monastery and church in Lviv, Ukraine

Monastery of Saint Onuphrius
- Монастир святого Онуфрія
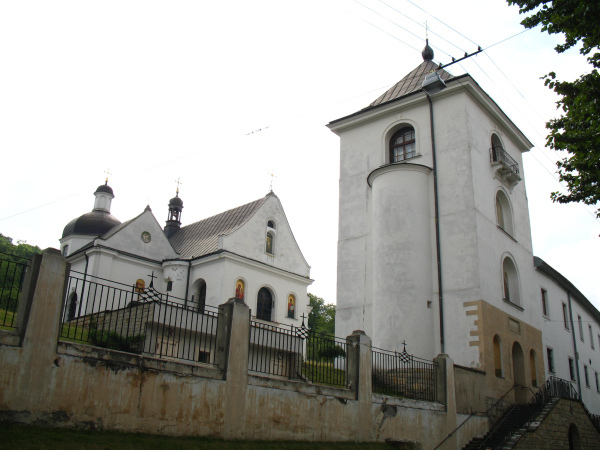

- Location within Lviv Oblast Location within Ukraine
- Interactive map of Monastery of Saint Onuphrius

Monastery information
- Order: Order of Saint Basil the Great
- Denomination: Ukrainian Greek Catholic Church
- Archdiocese: Lviv

Site
- Location: Lviv
- Country: Ukraine
- Coordinates: 49°50′58″N 24°1′44″E

The Basilian Monastery and Greek Catholic Church of St. Onuphrius in Lviv, Ukraine is located north of the Old Town, at the base of the Castle Hill.

Records mention a wooden church existed at this site already in the 13th century during the reign of Leo I of Halych. During the second half of the 15th century a monastery was built next to the church. A stone church was built in 1550 and in 1585 a monastery surrounded with fortifications. The church was destroyed and rebuilt several times. Damaged by Turks in 1672, it underwent a major reconstruction in 1680. In 1776 the church was connected with the previously separate chapel of the Holy Trinity, adjoining it to the north, a new classicist bell tower was built in 1820 and in the years 1821-1824 the presbytery was extended and a sacristy added. The church's present day look dates to 1902 when the southern nave was constructed symmetrically and both were topped with hexagonal domes. Inside the church holds 18th century polychromies and an iconostasis from 1908.

Under Soviet rule the church was closed and changed into a museum of the first Russian printer Ivan Fedorovych, who worked in the monastery at the end of the 16th century and is buried there. After the collapse of the Soviet Union it was returned to the Basilians and restored.
