= Stoneworks Prikaz =

Administrative office in Moscow, Russia

Stoneworks Prikaz (Russian: Каменный приказ) was an administrative office in Moscow (Russia), which supervised the implementation of the so-called "General Plan of Moscow" (city development plan, elaborated in 1774-1775).

Established in 1775, it was located on Uspensky Lane (today's Sverchkov Pereulok, 8) in the Sverchkov Chambers. The commander-in-chief (governor-general) of Moscow was in charge of the Stoneworks Prikaz, architect P. Kozhin being its only director during its existence. All state-owned and private brick and roof tile factories and stonemasons were transferred under the authority of the Stoneworks Prikaz. It supervised the conformity of urban construction to the 1775 plan, according to which one was allowed to build only stone houses in Kitai-gorod and Bely Gorod, and wooden houses on stone foundations - in Zemlyanoy Gorod. Architect Kozhin drew up a plan of rebuilding and rezoning of Moscow, which would define the ways of the city's development in the late 18th - first half of the 19th century.

In 1782, the Stoneworks Prikaz was abolished, its functions being transferred to the Board of Provision of Urban Amenities (Управа благочиния, or Uprava blagochiniya).
