= Pyotr Mstislavets =

Belarusian printer (16th century)

Pyotr Timofeyevich Mstislavets (Timofeyev) (Belarusian: Пётр Цімафеевіч Мсціславец; Russian: Пётр Тимофеевич Мстиславец (Тимофеев)) was a Belarusian printer and Ivan Fedorov's associate in Moscow.

Historians believe that Pyotr Mstislavets was born in a Belarusian town of Mstsislaw. Together with Ivan Fedorov, he printed the first Russian dated printed book Apostole (Апостолъ) on March 1, 1564 in Moscow. In 1565 Pyotr Mstislavets printed two editions of the Breviary (Часовникъ). Soon he and Ivan Fedorov had to leave Moscow. They opened a new print shop in Zabłudów (Zabludiv or Zabludaŭ, Grand Duchy of Lithuania, now in Poland) on the premises of the estate of hetman Jeremi Chodkiewicz. Here Mstislavets and Fedorov printed The Gospel (Учительное евангелие) in 1568–1569. In the summer of 1569 Mstislavets left for Vilnius and soon opened a print shop, equipped and financed by merchants Mamonichs. Here he printed The Four Gospels (Четвероевангеліе) in 1574–1575, which contained four full-page engravings with Evangelist portraits. In January 1576 Mstislavets finished printing the Psalter (Псалтырь) with a woodcut frontispiece, (Tsar David, or Царь Давид), multiple illuminations and decorated capital letters. In 1576 Mstislavets severed his relations with the Mamonichs. The court mandated him to return all of his printed books to the merchants and allowed him to keep his typographical equipment. Historians believe that after this incident Mstislavets continued his printing activities in Ostroh, Ukraine.

== See also ==
Moscow Print Yard
