= Constantine of Preslav =

Bulgarian scholar

Constantine of Preslav (Bulgarian: Константин Преславски) was a medieval Bulgarian scholar, writer and translator, one of the most important men of letters working at the Preslav Literary School at the end of the 9th and the beginning of the 10th century. Biographical evidence about his life is scarce but he is believed to have been a disciple of Saint Methodius. After the saint's death in 885, Constantine was jailed by the Germanic clergy in Great Moravia and sold as slave in Venice. He escaped to Constantinople, moving to Bulgaria around 886 and working at the Preslav Literary School.

He was one of the most prolific and important writers in Old Bulgarian. His most significant literary work was Учително евангелие (The Didactic Gospel), usually dated to the first years of the reign of Bulgarian tsar Simeon I, 893 – 894. The work represents a compilation of lectures about a number of church holidays and is the first systematic work treating sermons in Slavic literature. The compilation also features the poetic preface Азбучна молитва (Alphabet Prayer), the first original poetry in Old Church Slavonic.

In 894 Constantine of Preslav wrote the historical work Историкии (Histories), the first historical chronicle in Slavic literature. In 906, by commission from Simeon I, the author translated Четири слова против арианите (Four Epistles against the Arians) by Saint Athanasius of Alexandria, as a response to the beginning of the spread of heresies in medieval Bulgaria. Constantine is also the alleged author of Служба на Методия (Service for Methodius), in which he relates the struggle of Saint Methodius for the recognition of Old Church Slavonic, as well as of Проглас към евангелието (Proclamation of the Holy Gospels) in which he rejects and admonishes the admiration of the foreign language (mean. Greek) and champions Old Bulgarian for the development and elevation of Bulgarian culture.

None of the original works of Constantine of Preslav has survived the burning of Preslav by Byzantine Emperor John I Tzimisces in 972 and the period of Ottoman rule (1396 – 1878). All of his works are known from copies, the earliest of which date back to the 12th and the 13th century.
