= Stauropegion Institute =

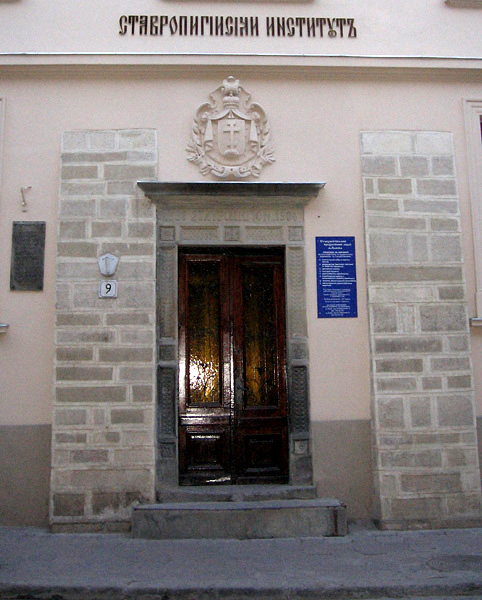
Front entrance at vulytsia Fedorova, 9 carries the Lviv Dormition Brotherhood coat of arms

The Stauropegion Institute was one of the most important cultural and educational institutions in Galicia (today western Ukraine) from the end of the 18th century until World War II. For much of its history it was controlled by Galician Russophiles.

== History ==
The Stauropegion Institute was founded in Lviv in 1788 on the orders of Joseph II, Emperor of Austria soon after Austria annexed Eastern Galicia, now western Ukraine, from Poland during the First Partition of Poland. It was based on the Lviv Dormition Brotherhood, a Greek Catholic religious brotherhood.

Until the mid-19th century the Stauropegion Institute was the only large educational and cultural institution in western Ukraine. It operated a printing press, bound and sold books, maintained a scholarship fund, and published textbooks and spelling primers. In the mid-19th century the Institute was taken over by Galician Russophiles and controlled by them until 1915. It was then controlled by the Ukrainophiles until 1922, when the Polish government restored Russophile control over the Institute. From the late 19th century its publications were written in Iazychie (a Western Ukrainian academic language that combined Russian, Church Slavonic, western Ukrainian and Polish speech) before switching to the Russian language in the 20th century. The Stauropegion Institute was liquidated by the Soviet authorities when they annexed western Ukraine in 1939 and its collection was transferred to the Lviv's branch of the Central State Historical Archives of the Ukrainian SSR.

== Collection ==
The Stauropegion Institute had a large endowment and owned several parcels of land and buildings throughout Lviv. It housed numerous important historical and cultural documents. The Institute's collection included the 12th century Horodyshche Apostolos, the 13th century Horodyshche Gospel, The Book of the Soul Named Gold written by Peter Mogila, 17th century Metropolitan of Kiev, Galicia and all Ruthenia', the Lviv Chronicles, various royal Polish patents, grants, and charters from the years 1522–1767, 16th and 17th century documents from Moldavian princes and from the Patriarch of Constantinople, printed books from the 15th century and onward, and religious art.

== See also ==
- Ukrainian Russophiles
