= Nikolskaya Street =

Pedestrian street in Moscow, Russia

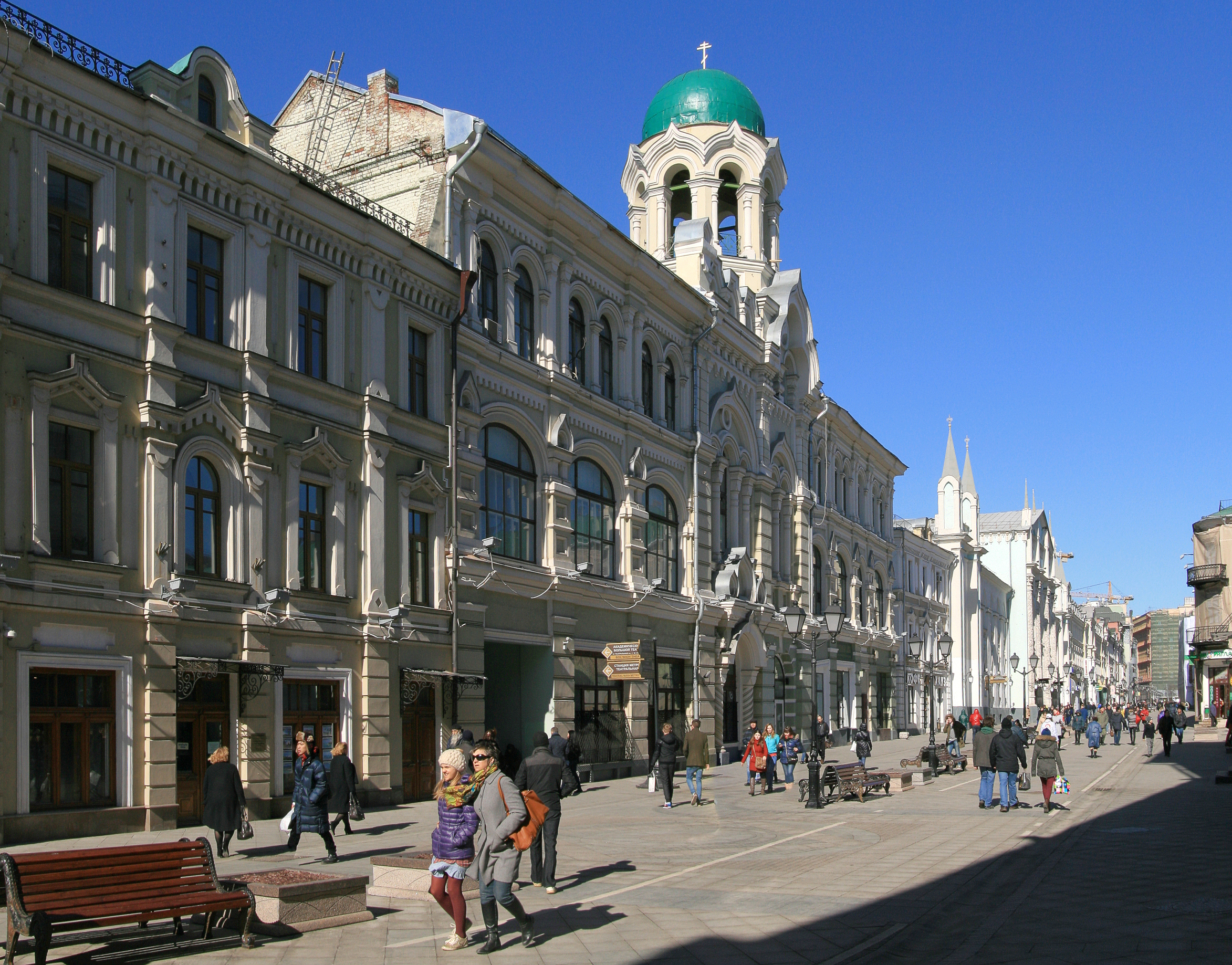
- Nikolskaya Street near the Monastery of St. Nicholas
- Native name: Никольская улица (Russian)
- Location: Moscow; Central Administrative Okrug; Tverskoy District
- Postal code: 109012
- Nearest metro station: Lubyanka; Okhotny Ryad; Teatralnaya; Ploshchad Revolyutsii
- Coordinates: 55.757261°N 37.622683°E

Nikolskaya Street (Russian: Никольская улица) is a pedestrian street in the Kitay-Gorod of Moscow. It connects Red Square and Lubyanka Square. In 1935, it was renamed from Nikolskaya Street to Street of the 25th of October before its original name was restored in 1990.

The north side of the street is lined with historic buildings, such as the Kazan Cathedral, the Old Mint, Monastery of the Holy Saviour, Greek Monastery of St. Nicholas (from which this street takes its name), and the former Holy Synod Printing Offices, Russia's first publishing house. The south side contains the GUM and the Dormition Church, an example of the Naryshkin Baroque underwritten by the Saltykov boyar family in 1691.

Before Stalin's reconstruction of downtown Moscow, the street led to the Vladimir Gates of the Kitay-Gorod wall (1534-38) which used to dominate the Lubyanka Square. Another Naryshkin Baroque church, dating from 1694, adjoined the gate, as did the more recent chapel of St. Pantaleon with a large cupola. All these buildings were razed in 1934 by the Soviet regime.

The Nikolskaya Street and the neighbouring Tretyakovsky Proyezd are the center of Moscow's traditional luxury shopping district. It was pedestrianized in August 2013.
