= Konstanty Korniakt =

Polish merchant (1517–1603)

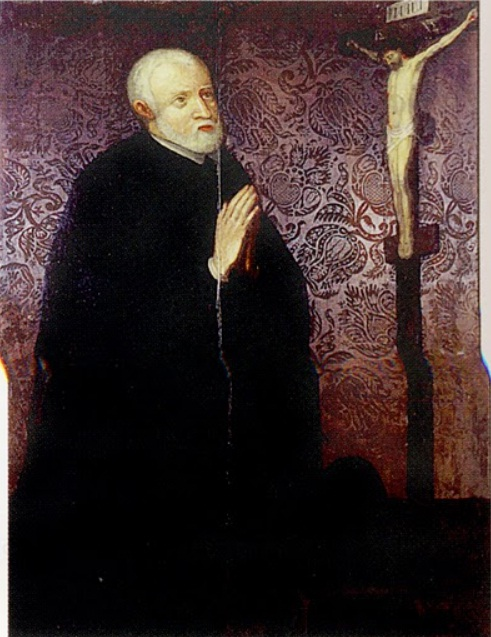
- Portrait of Korniakt at prayer
- Born: Konstantinos Korniaktos (Κωνσταντίνος Κορνιακτός); 1517; Candia, Kingdom of Candia
- Died: 1603 (aged 85–86); Lwów, Crown of the Kingdom of Poland, Polish–Lithuanian Commonwealth
- Known for: Financing the construction of the Korniakt Palace in Lviv,
- Spouse: Anna Dzieduszycka
- Children: 7 children

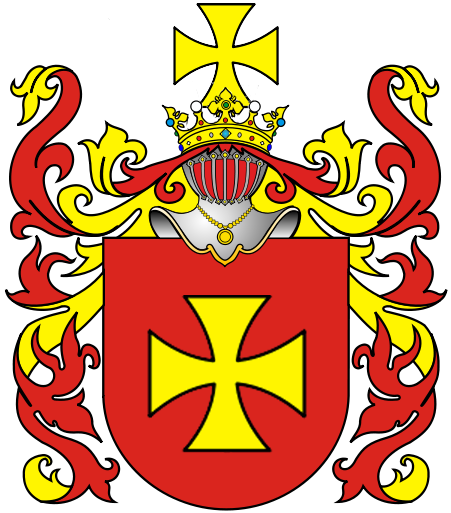
Konstanty Korniakt coat of arms

Konstanty Korniakt (Greek: Κωνσταντίνος Κορνιακτός, Konstantinos Korniaktos; c. 1517 – 1 August 1603) was a merchant of Greek descent, active throughout Central and Eastern Europe; a leaseholder of royal tolls who collected customs duty on behalf of the king. During his lifetime he was the wealthiest man in Lviv (Lwów, in Polish) and even owned numerous villages. He was a wholesale merchant and founder of the Korniakt family dynasty.

== Biography ==
Korniaktos, a Greek, was born in the city of Candia (today Heraklion) on Crete in 1517. He moved to Constantinople at a young age where already in 1540 he became a wealthy merchant. Later he moved to Moldavia where he lived for the rest of his life. Some time in the 1560s Korniakt settled in the city of Lwów (now Lviv, Ukraine) where he took over a business of his older brother Michael. Already at the time Moldavia in Lviv was closely associated with Walachia. The King of Poland Sigismund II Augustus granted him official title of nobility on 12 February 1571 as szlachcic Konstanty Korniakt, also awarded a number of other privileges, thereby establishing the Krucina coat of arms. Krucina,

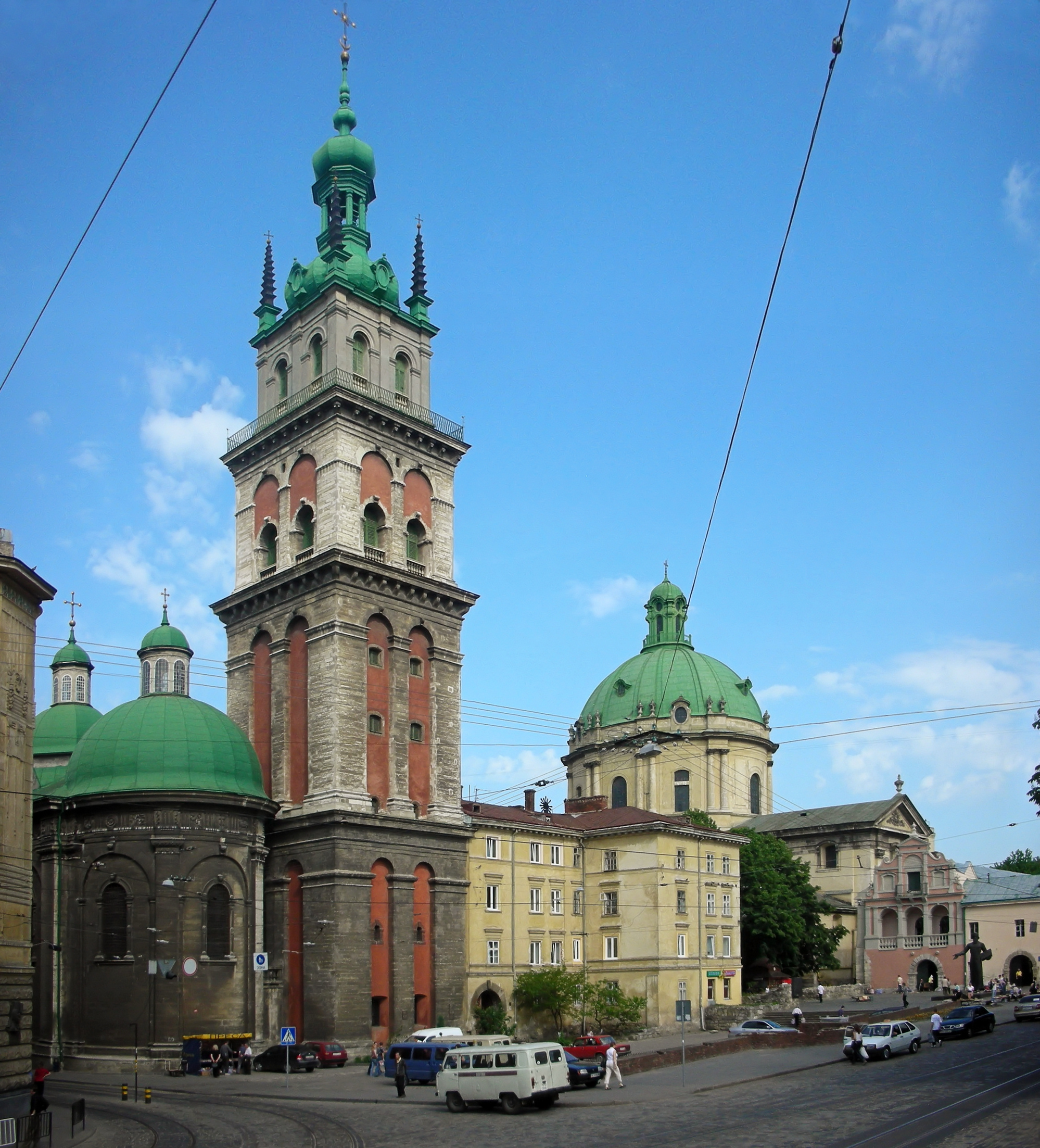
The Korniaktowska Tower in the Dormition Church, Lviv by Pietro di Barbona, paid for by Korniakt.

Konstanty Korniakt dealt with international trade, especially from the Ottoman Empire and the Holy Roman Empire. He became a merchant and traded in wine, cloth, cotton, honey, hides and furs and soon became very wealthy, even lending money to the kings of Poland including Sigismund II Augustus, and other noble families.

=== Contributions ===
Korniakt was a patron of architecture and built a magnificent house near the market, which later was rebuilt by John III Sobieski and is now known as the Korniakt Palace. He also expanded the Wallachian church and funded its famous tower. He was an ardent follower of the Eastern Orthodox Church and defended its interests maintaining friendly relations with other Christian denominations.

== Family ==
Around 1575 he married Ruthenian noblewoman Anna Dzieduszycka h. Sas, and soon had children. His sons were Alexander, Constantine (father of Captain Charles Francis) and Michael Korniakt, his daughters were Katarzyna, Anna (married Jan "Gratus" Tarnowski), Sophia (married Abraham Hubert) and Catherine (married Aleksander Chodkiewicz and after his death the governor of Belz, Duke Konstanty Wiśniowiecki).

Soon after his death in 1603, all of his children converted to Catholicism and eventually were polonized. His son subsequently sold part of his estate and land in Lwów, and his brother Alexander Korniaktow left and moved to the property he inherited from his parents in Przemyśl. He was owner of three residences in the villages Sośnica, Złotowice and Białoboki, the latter being chosen for the family. In 1610 the construction of the castle began.

== Annotations ==
1. His Greek, original name was Konstantinos Korniaktos. In Polish, his name is spelt Konstanty Korniakt. It is sometimes spelt Constantine Korniakt. Other spellings of his surname include Corniaktos, Kornak, Korniak, Korniat, Korneadi, Korneades, Carneadi, Coretho, Carinacto.

== See also ==
- Korniakt Palace
