= Kamianets-Podilskyi =

City in Khmelnytskyi Oblast, Ukraine

Kamianets-Podilskyi Кам'янець-Подільський
- City
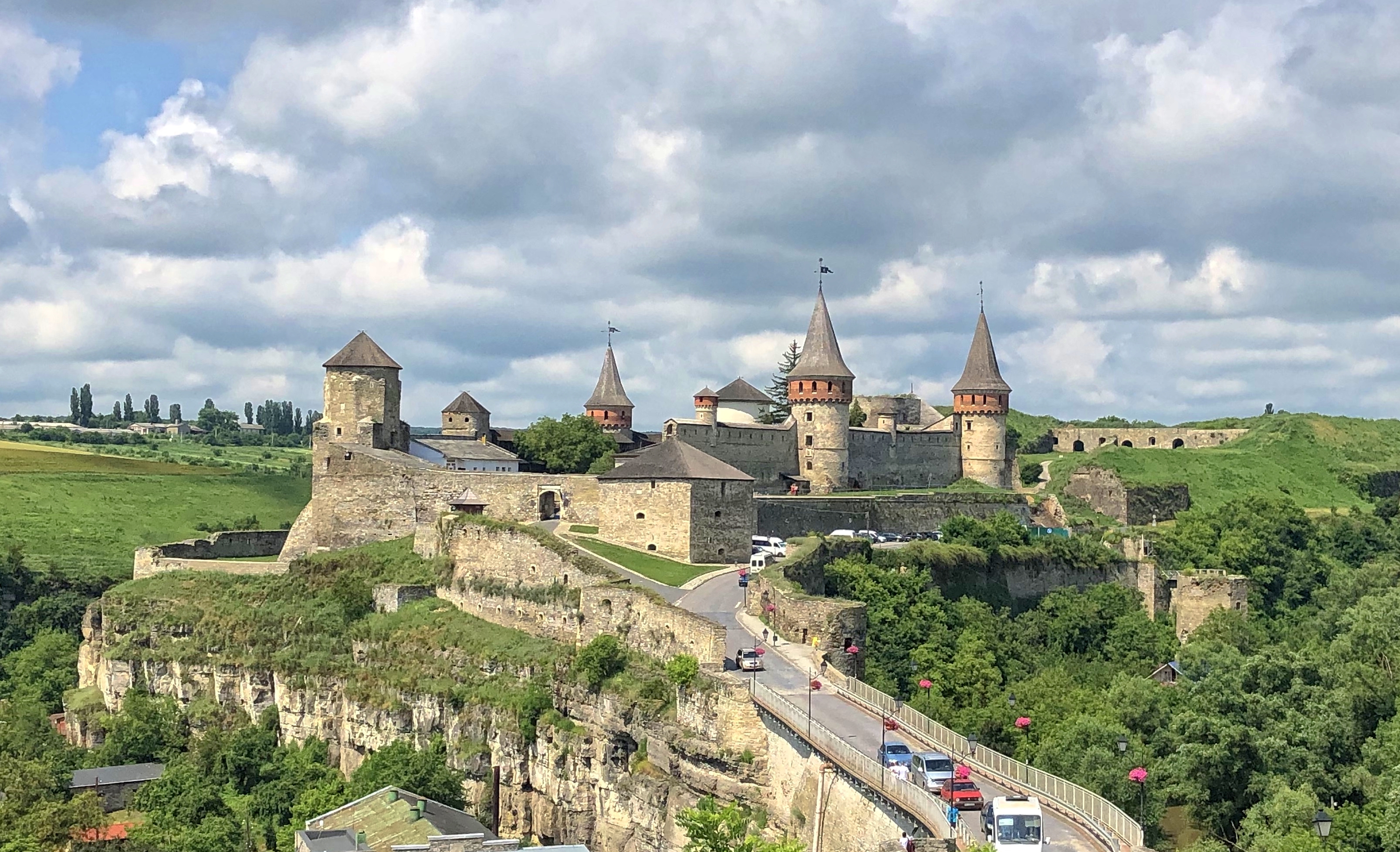
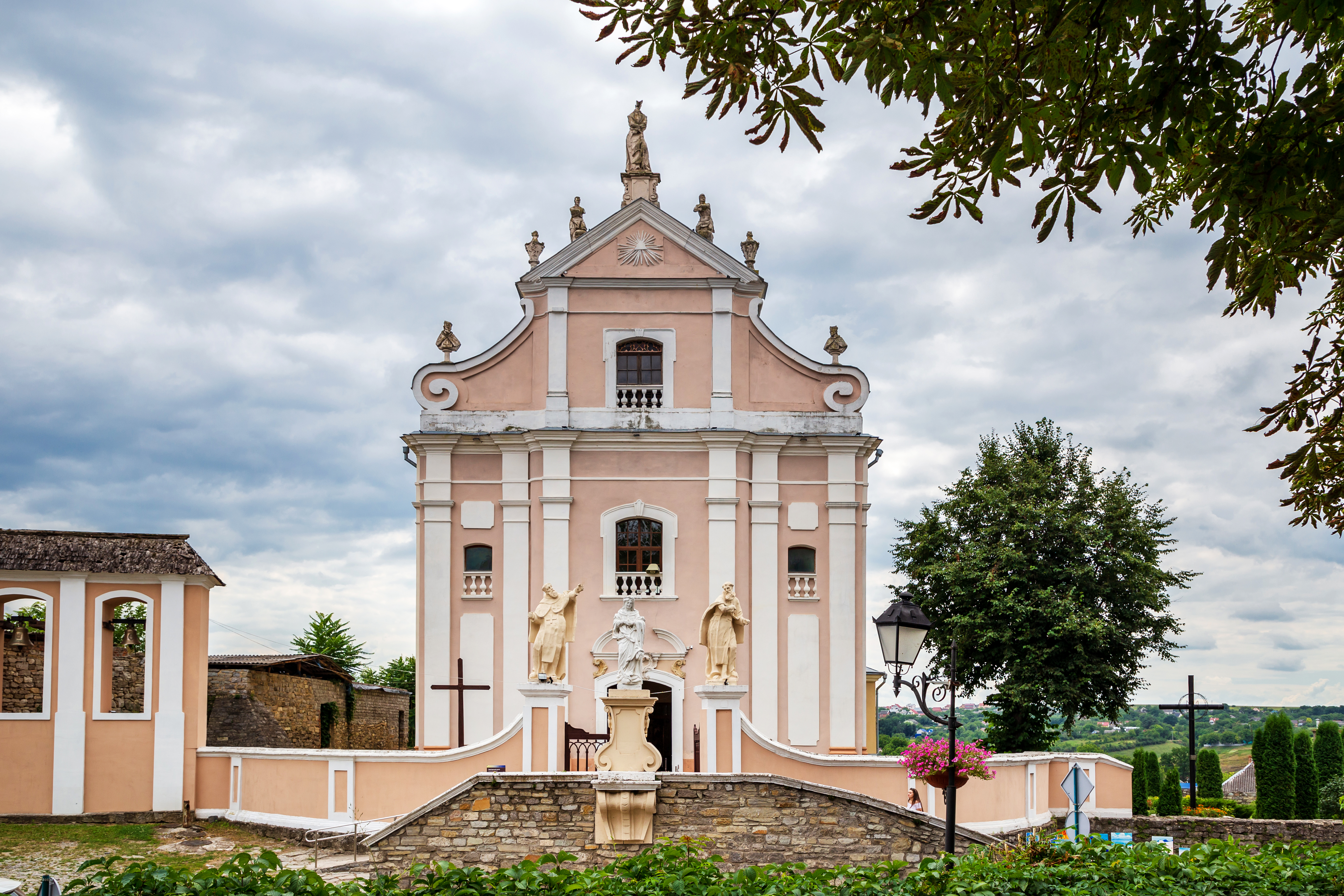
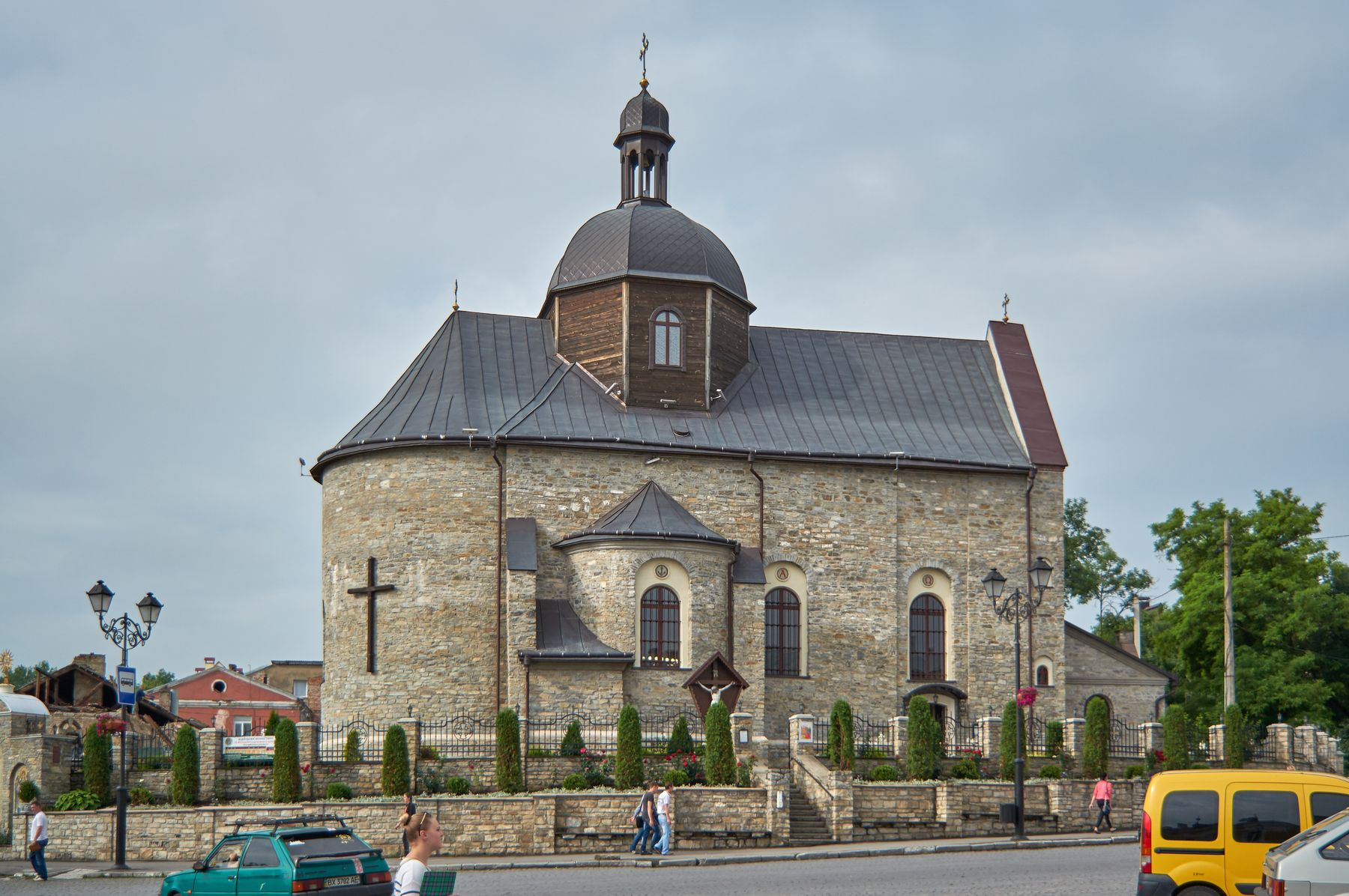
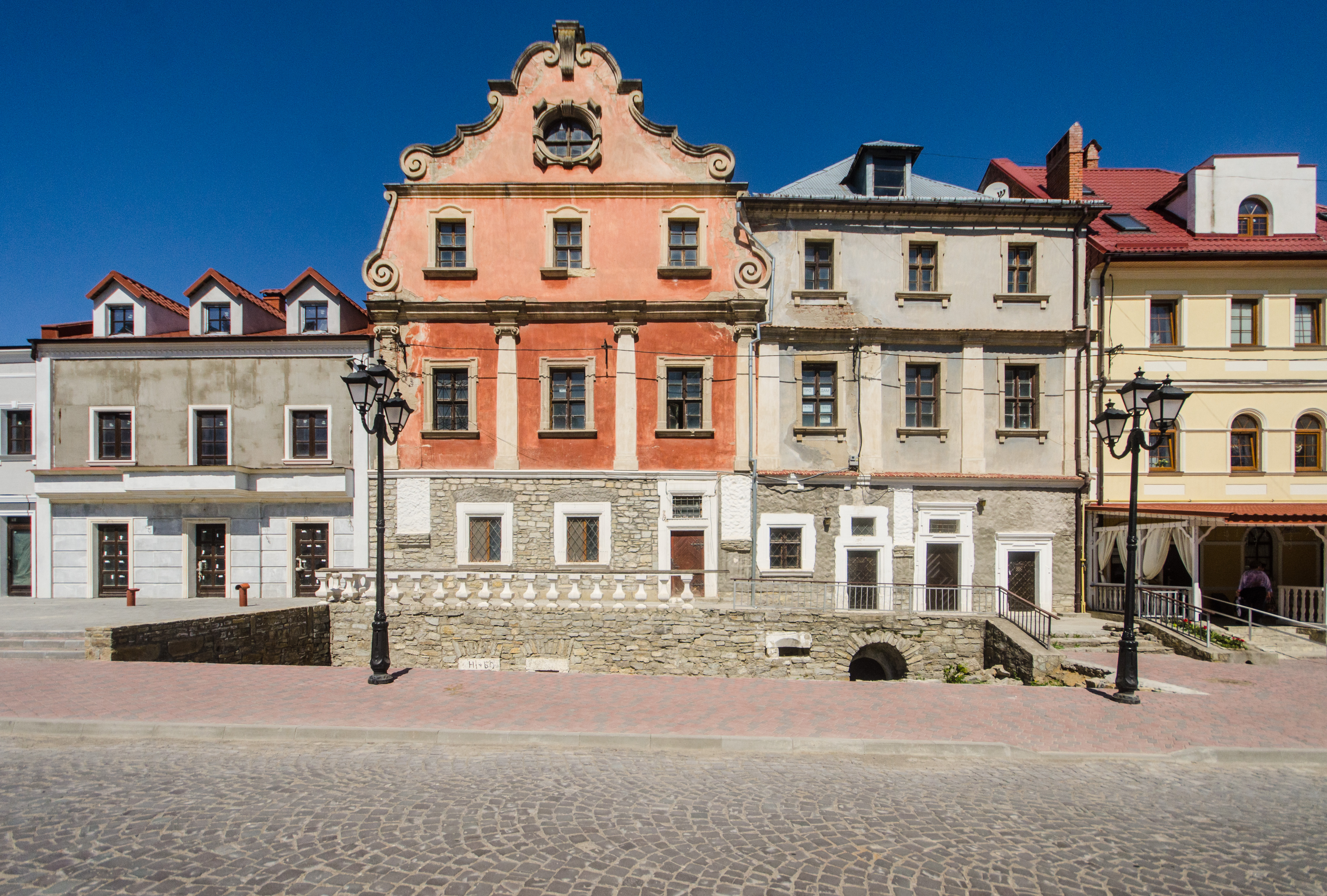
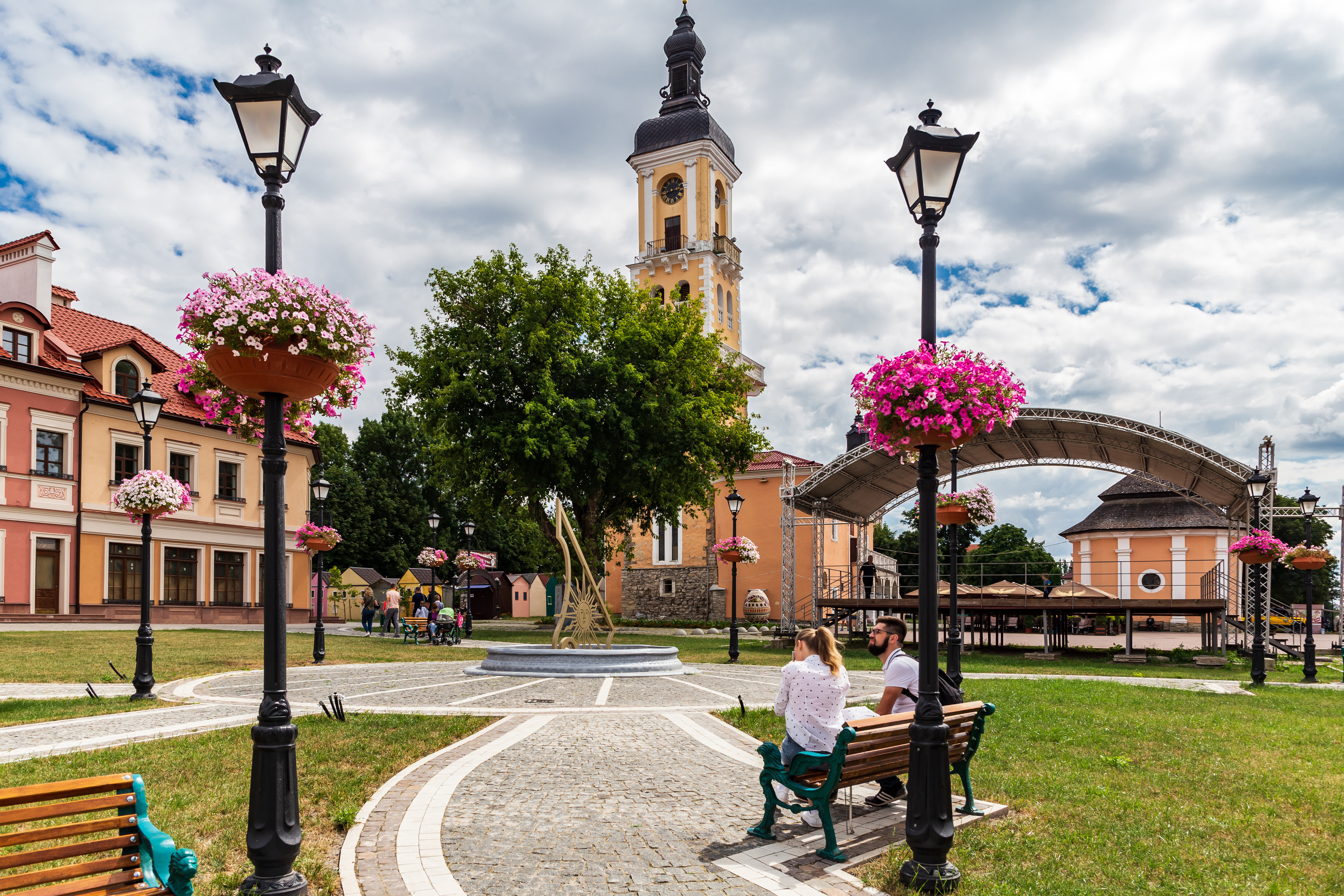
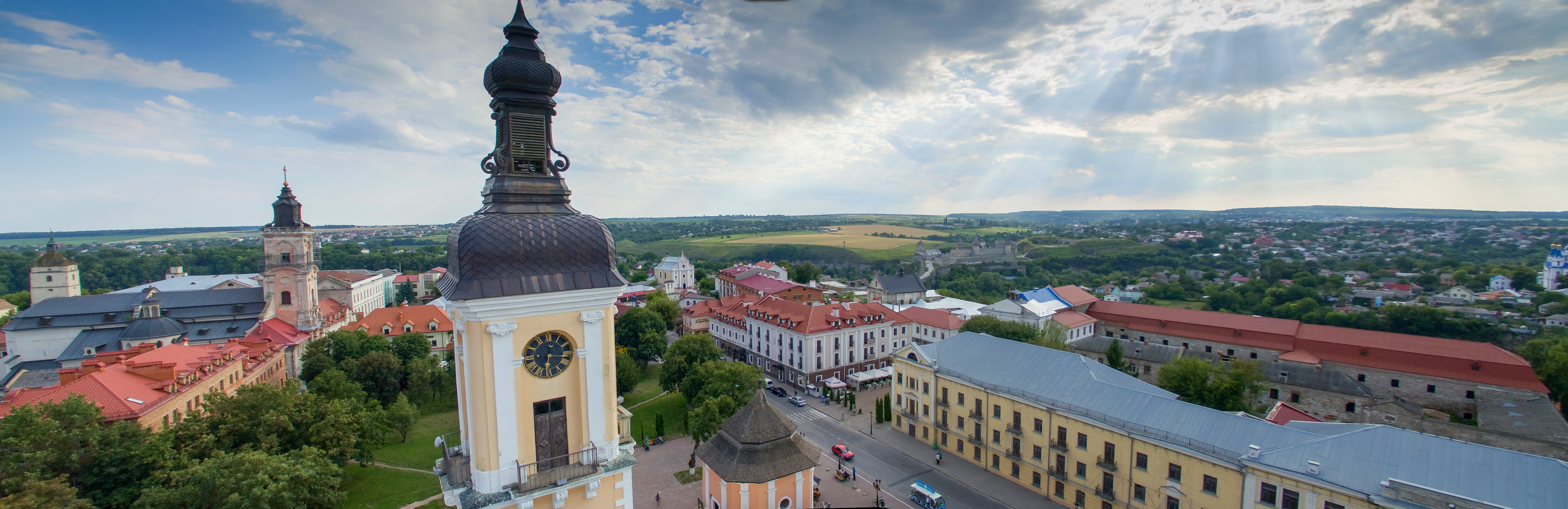
- From top, left to right: Castle; Saint Josaphat church; Holy Trinity Church; Polish Market Square; Polish Town Hall; Old Town panorama

- Flag Coat of arms
- Interactive map of Kamianets-Podilskyi
- Location within Khmelnytskyi Oblast Location within Ukraine
- Coordinates: 48°41′00″N 26°35′00″E
- Country: Ukraine
- Oblast: Khmelnytskyi Oblast
- Raion: Kamianets-Podilskyi Raion
- Hromada: Kamianets-Podilskyi urban hromada
- First mentioned: 1062
- City rights: 1432

Government
  - Mayor: Mykhailo Positko (Svoboda)

Area
  - Total: 27,871 km^{2} (10,761 sq mi)

Population (2022)
  - Total: 96,896
  - Density: 3.4766/km^{2} (9.0043/sq mi)
- Time zone: UTC+2 (EET)
  - Summer (DST): UTC+3 (EEST)
- Postal code: 32300—32318
- Area code: +380-3849

Kamianets-Podilskyi (Ukrainian: Кам'янець-Подільський, IPA: [kɐmjɐˈnɛt͡sʲ poˈd⁽ʲ⁾ilʲsʲkɪi̯, ˈkɑmjɐnet͡sʲ]; Polish: Kamieniec Podolski) is a city on the Smotrych River in western Ukraine, to the north-east of Chernivtsi. Formerly the administrative center of Khmelnytskyi Oblast, the city is now the administrative center of Kamianets-Podilskyi Raion within the oblast. It hosts the administration of Kamianets-Podilskyi urban hromada.

Kamianets-Podilskyi is a historical center of Podillia region, serving as a capital of the Duchy of Podolia, Podolian Voivodeship, Podolia Eyalet, Podolia Governorate, and Podolian District. During the Ukrainian–Soviet War, the city officially served as the temporary capital of the Ukrainian People's Republic from 1919 to 1920.

== Name ==
Originally known as Kamianets, its name was changed to the current following the partitions of Poland and occupation by the Russian Empire in 1795.

The first part of the city's dual name originates from kamin' (Ukrainian: камiнь, Polish: kamień) or kamen, meaning 'stone' in Old Slavic. The second part of its name relates to the historic region of Podillia (Ukrainian: Подíлля, Polish: Podole), of which Kamianets-Podilskyi is considered to be the historic capital. Therefore, the town name literally means 'The Stone of Podilia'.

Equivalents of the name in other languages are: Polish: Kamieniec Podolski; Russian: Каменец-Подольский, romanized: Kamenets-Podolsky or Каменец-Подольск, Kamenets-Podolsk; Romanian: Camenița Podoliei; Latin: Camenecium; Ottoman Turkish: كامانىچه, romanized: Kamaniçe; Hungarian: Kamenyeck-Podolszk; Yiddish: קאָמענעץ ,קאמיניץ, romanized: Komenets, Komenits.

== History ==
=== Classical antiquity ===
Several historians consider that a city on this spot was founded by the ancient Dacians, who lived in what is now modern Romania, Moldova, and portions of Ukraine. Historians write that the founders named the settlement Petridava or Klepidava, which originate from the Greek word petra or Latin lapis 'stone' and Dacian dava 'city'.

=== Principality of Halych and Tatars (11th c.–1241) ===
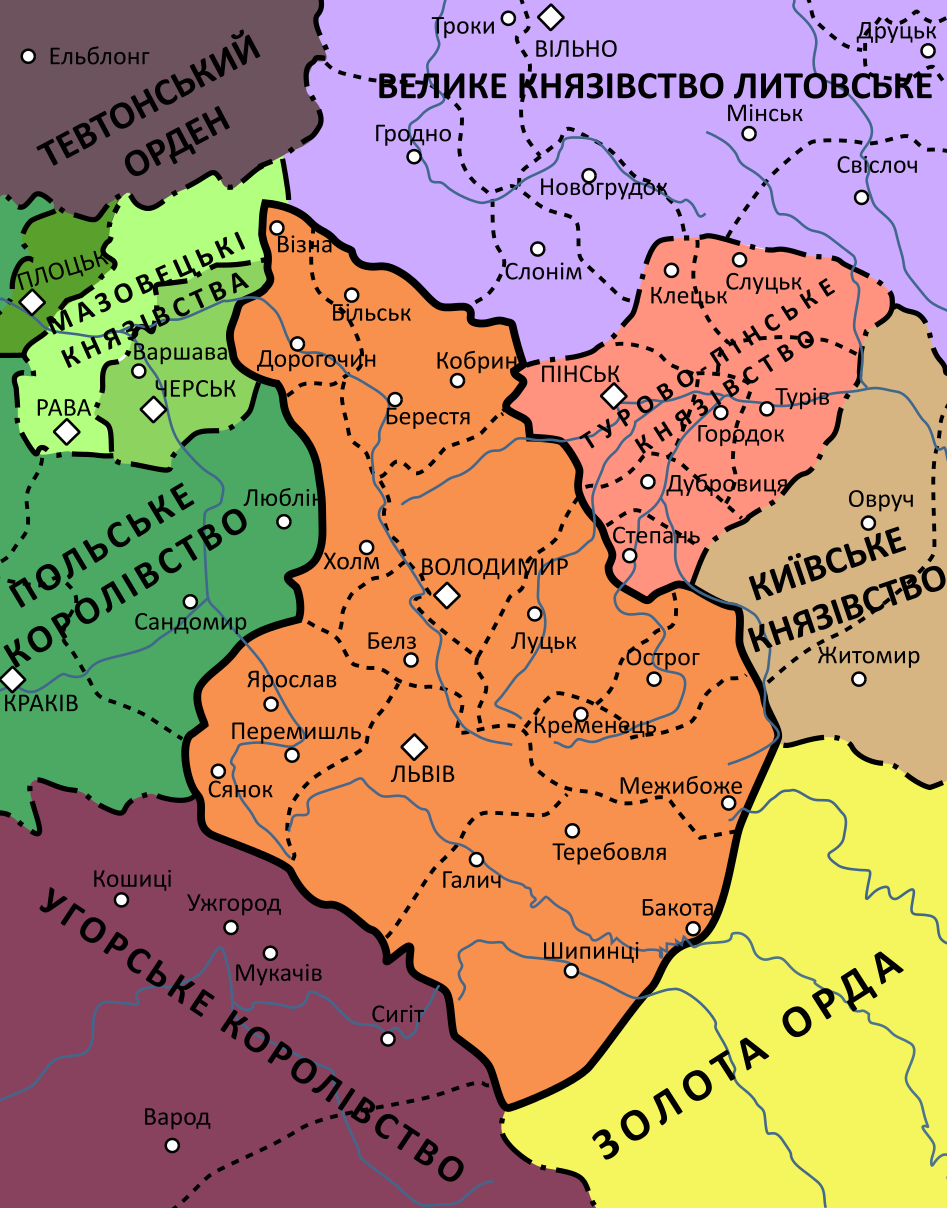
Galician-Volhynian Principality (1323—1340), includes Kamianets-Podilskyi

Historical coat of arms of Kamianets

Modern Kamianets-Podilskyi was first mentioned in 1062, when it belonged to smaller principality of Terebovlia, then Halych principality and Kingdom of Galicia–Volhynia. Around 1230, the Galician prince Lev Danilovich invited Armenians to join his army to defend the eastern border of his state. In gratitude for their good military service, the prince rewarded them with estates and land near Kamianets. In 1241, it was destroyed by the Mongolian invaders.

=== Polish rule (1352–1672) ===
In 1352, it was inherited by the Polish King Casimir III. In 1374 the city was granted Magdeburg Law by prince George Koriatovich. In 1370, the Dominican monastic order began to function in Kamianets, a monastery was founded, and soon the Franciscans founded their own monastery in the city. Later, monks of other orders moved: Jesuits (1608), Discalced Carmelites (1623), Trinitarians (1699). In 1378 it became seat of a Latin Catholic diocese. In 1432 King Sigismund I the Old granted Kamieniec Podolski city rights. It was an important royal city of Poland. In 1434 it became the capital of the Podolian Voivodship and the seat of local civil and military administration. Starting from the late 15th century, separate Ruthenian and Armenian courts functioned in the city based on the respective law of each community. The ancient castle was reconstructed and substantially expanded by the Polish kings to defend Poland from the southwest against Ottoman and Tatar invasions, thus it was called the gateway to Poland. In 1510, a peace treaty was signed in the city between Poland and the Principality of Moldavia.

During the free election period in Poland, Kamianets-Podilskyi, as one of the most influential cities of the state, enjoyed voting rights (alongside Warsaw, Kraków, Poznań, Gdańsk, Lwów, Wilno, Lublin, Toruń and Elbląg). Starting from the 15th century, it was, along with Lviv, the most important centre of trade in the region, as well as the biggest fortress in the eastern part of Poland.

=== Ottoman rule (1672–1699) ===
In 1672 the city was captured by the Turks and their ally hetman Petro Doroshenko. After the Treaty of Buchach of 1672, Kamianets-Podilskyi was briefly part of the Ottoman Empire and capital of Podolya eyalet. It was also sanjak of pasha (central sanjak) of this eyalet with nahiyas of Kropotova, Satanova, İskala, Kitayhorad, Kırıvçe, Zhvan (It was known as Ijvan during Ottoman rule) and Mıhaylov. To counter the Turkish threat to the Polish–Lithuanian Commonwealth, King Jan III Sobieski built a fortress nearby, Okopy Świętej Trójcy (now Okopy, Ternopil Oblast; meaning "the Entrenchments of the Holy Trinity"). In 1674, local Armenians, who made up one of the main Armenian communes in Poland up to that point, were expelled by the Ottomans. Most, after about three years of exile in the Balkans, moved to the territories remaining within Poland, chiefly Lwów and Stanisławów.

In 1687, Poland attempted to regain control over Kamianets-Podilskyi and Podolia, when the fortress was unsuccessfully besieged by the Poles led by Prince James Louis Sobieski. According to Polish historian Dariusz Kołodziejczyk, after realizing their inability to hold the surrounding region under their power, the Ottomans resettled the burghers of Kamianets, moving the Armenians to Philippopolis and the Jews to Adrianople and Istanbul.

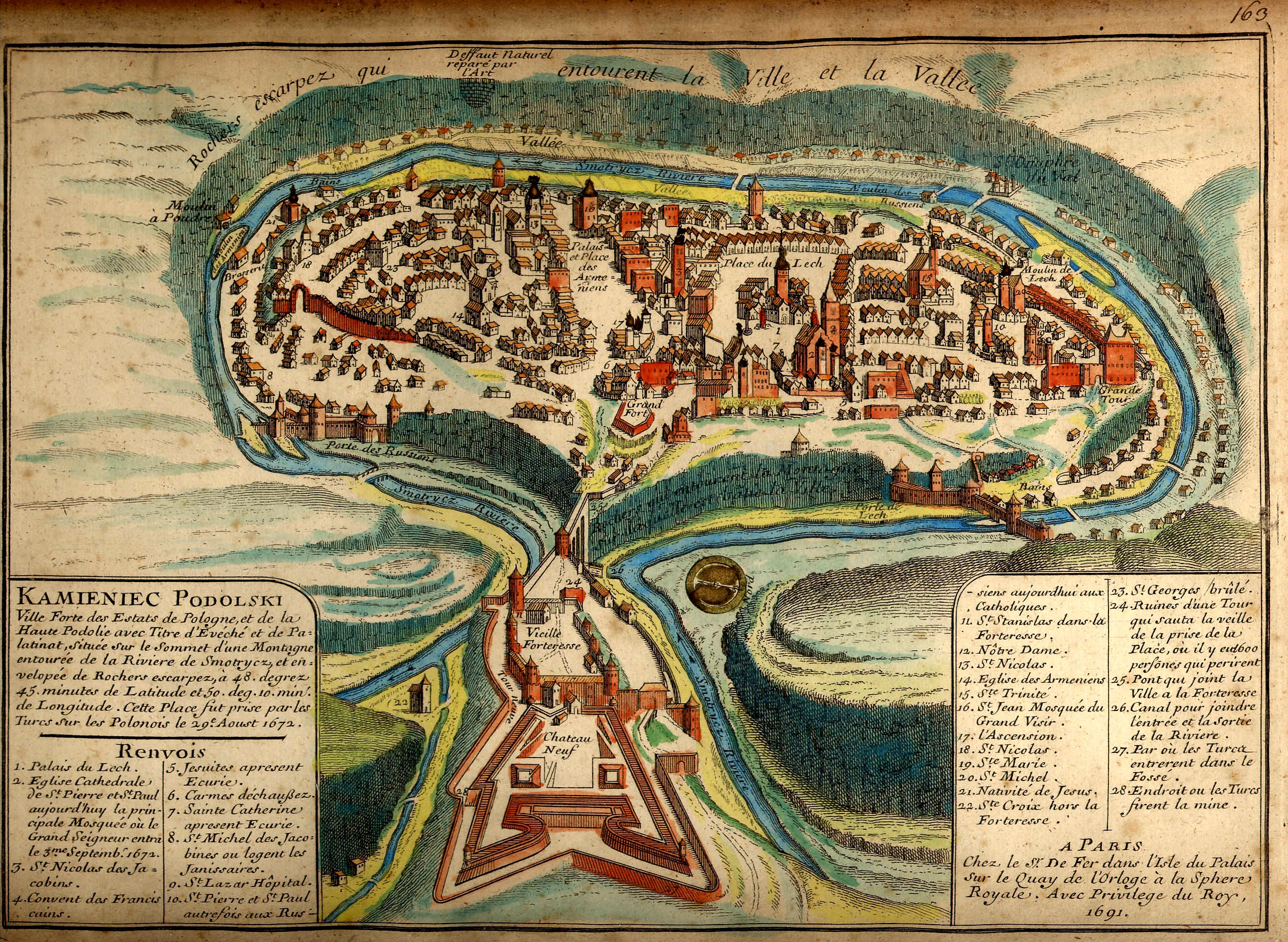
A 1691 French map depicting the city's old town neighbourhood and castle, surrounded by the winding Smotrych River

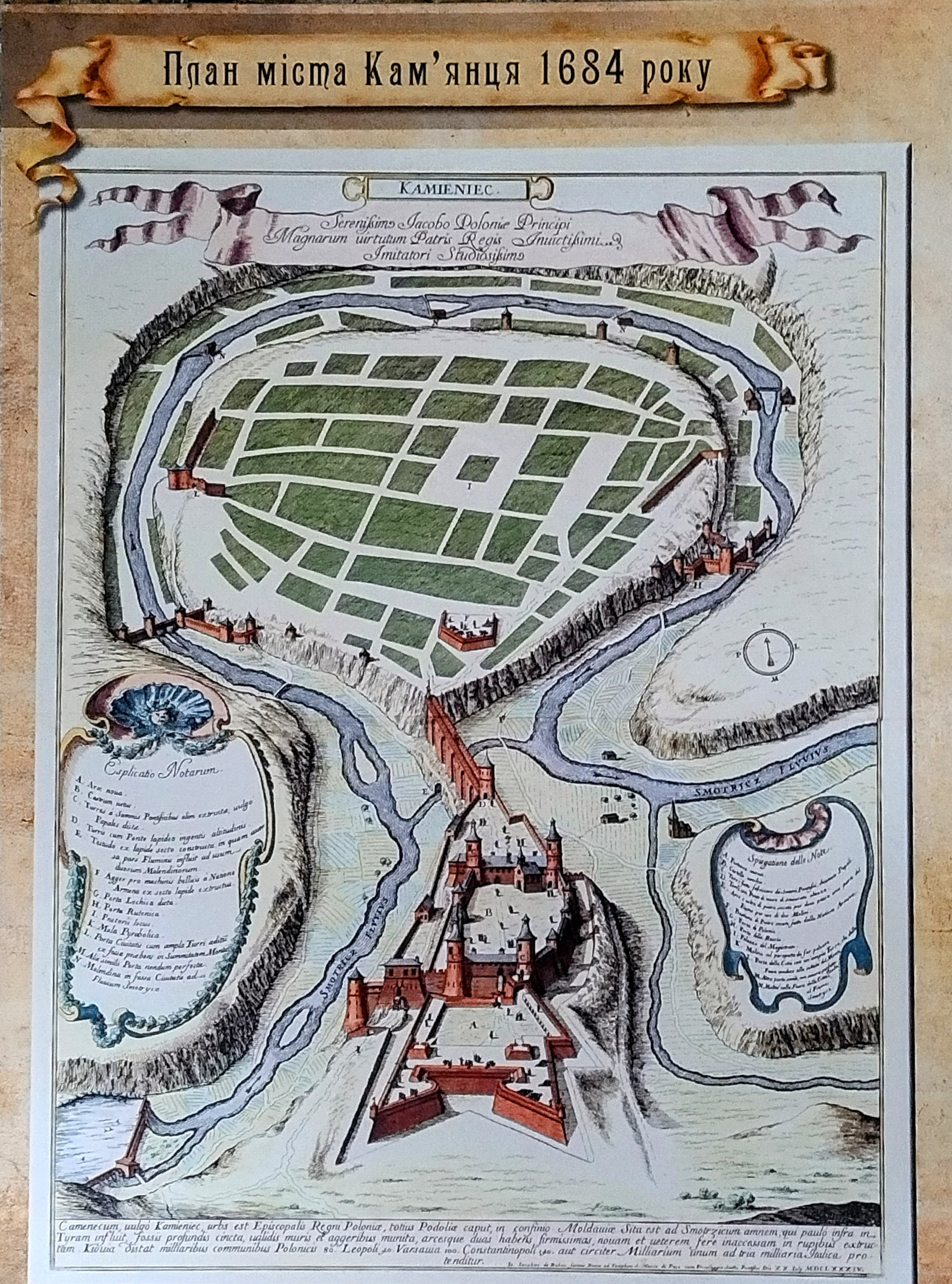
1684 map depicting the city's old town

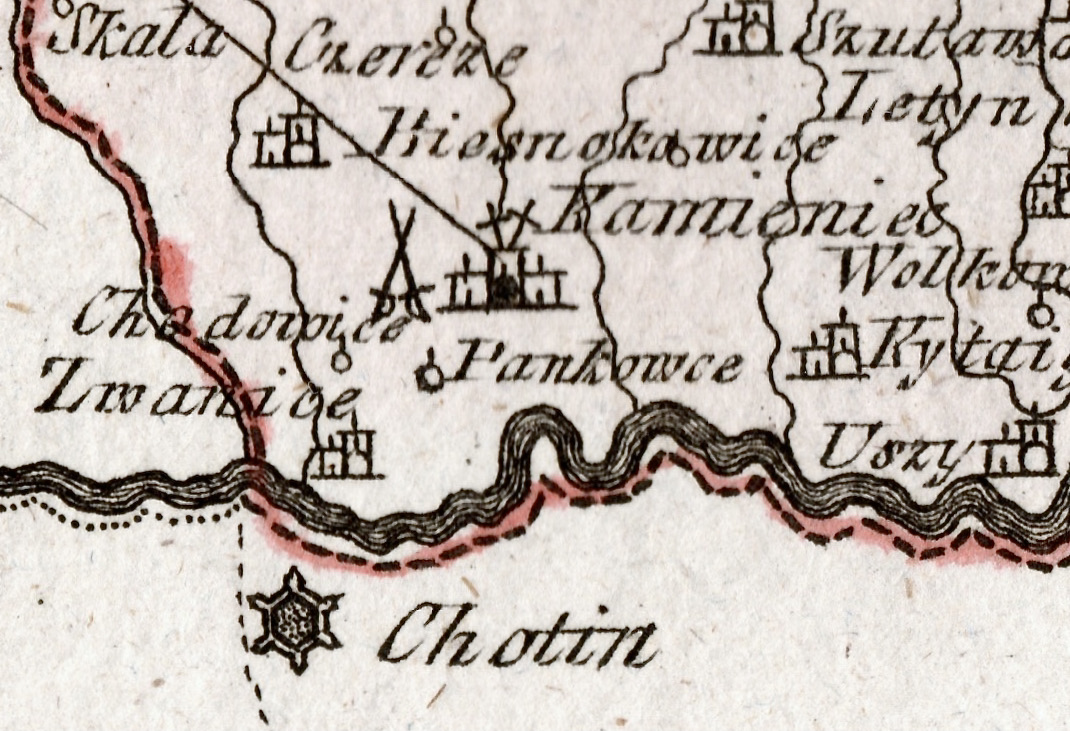
Kamieniec on the map of Johann Franz Joseph von Riley (1789)

=== Polish–Lithuanian Commonwealth (1699–1793) ===
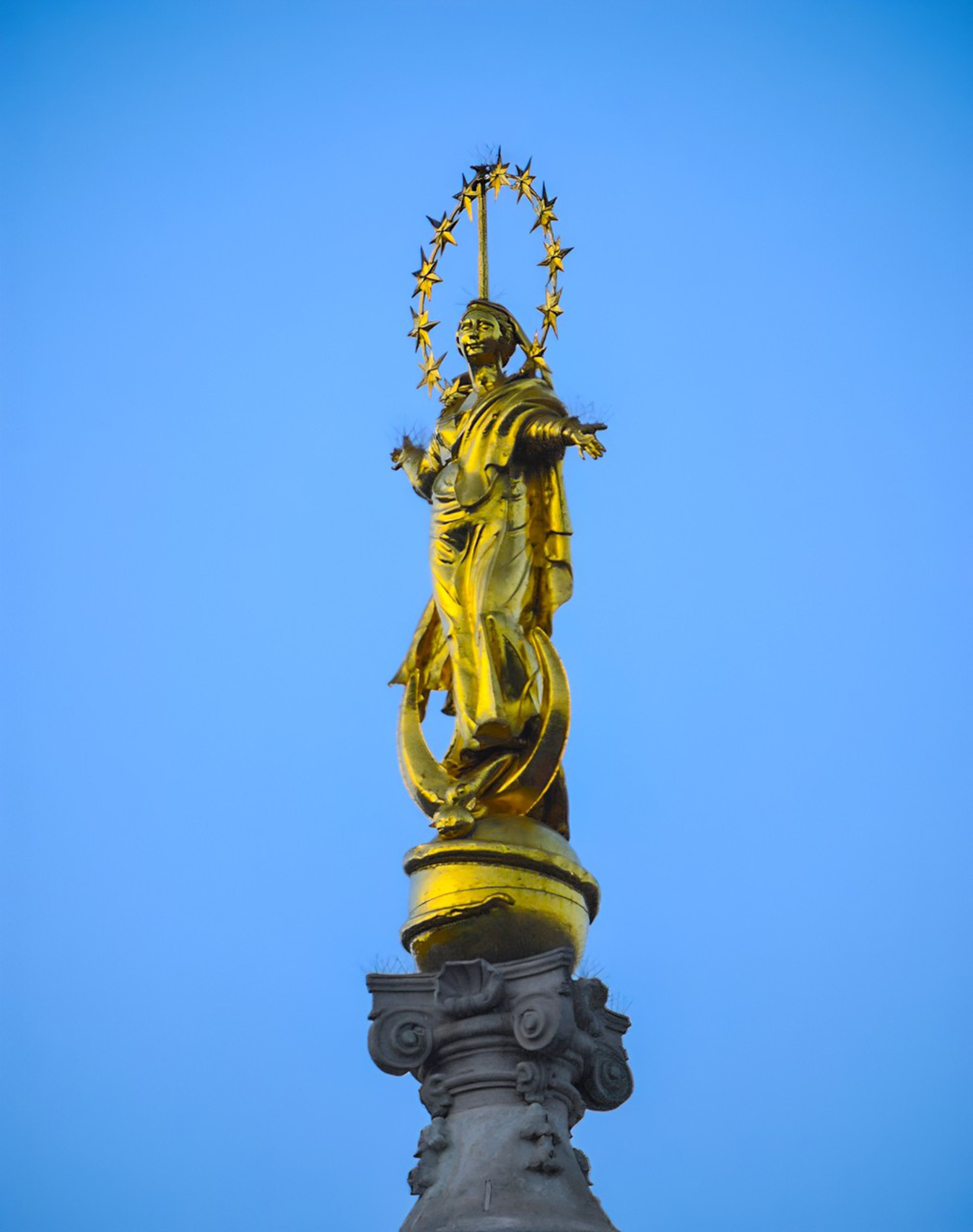
Figure of the Virgin Mary

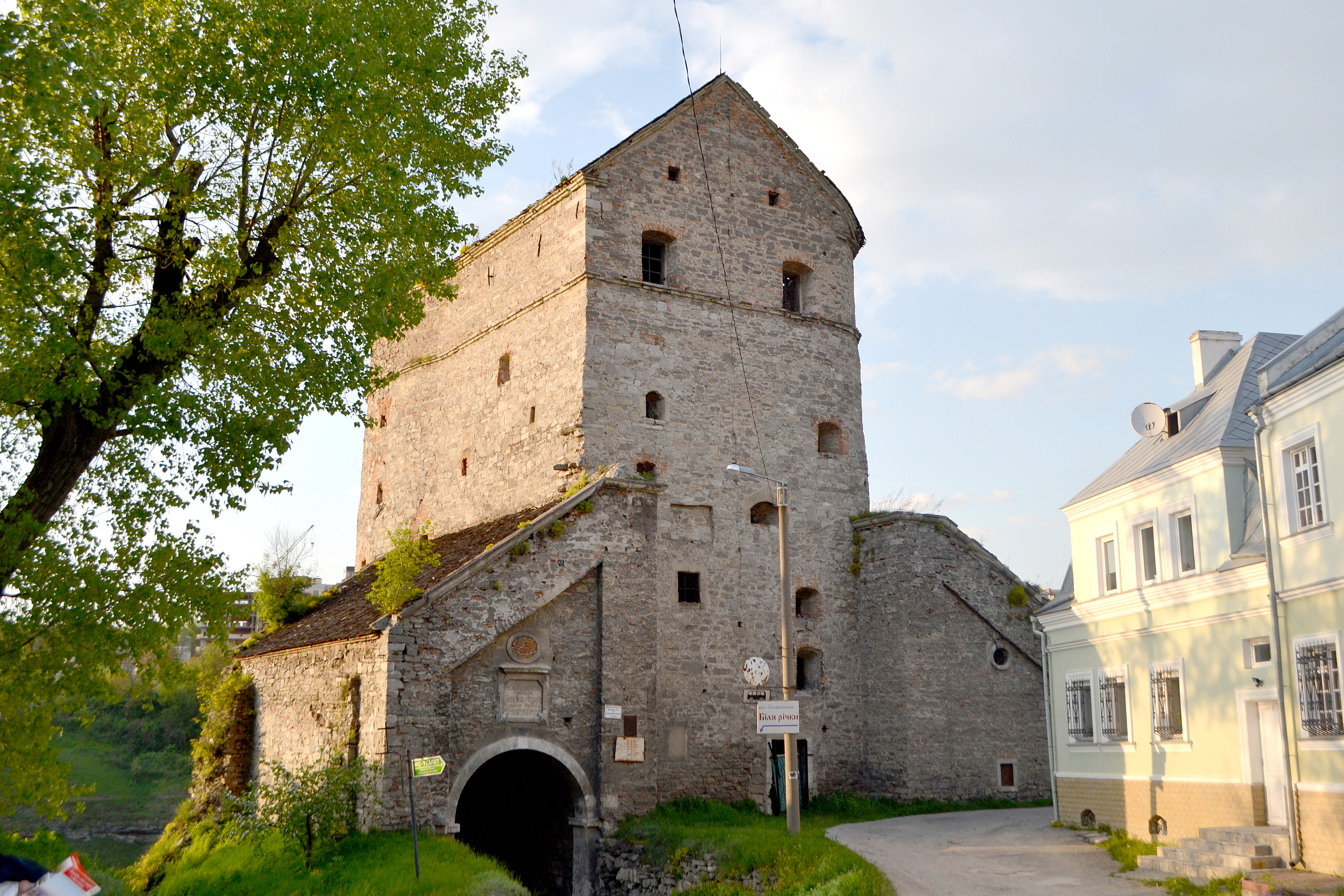
The Stephen Báthory Gate is part of the city's old fortification complex

In 1699, the city was given back to Poland under King Augustus II the Strong according to the Treaty of Karlowitz. The fortress was continually enlarged and was regarded as the strongest in the Polish–Lithuanian Commonwealth. The preserved ruins of the fortress still contain the iron cannonballs stuck in them from various sieges.

During this period, Bishop Dembowski, at the instigation of the Frankists, convened a public disputation at Kamieniec Podolski, in November 1757, and ordered all copies of the Talmud found in his bishopric to be confiscated and burned. Accounts of the Talmud burning differ—contemporary sources say that up to a thousand copies of the Talmud were destroyed, though other reports say only one copy was burned. Dembowski himself died days after the events. A plague broke out and the local priests exhumed his body and cut the head off to prevent any further disaster.

=== Russian rule (1793–1915) ===
After the Second Partition of Poland in 1793, the city belonged to the Russian Empire, where it was the capital of the Podolia Governorate. In the 19th century, city's fortifications lost their importance due to the development of military technology, and in 1808 were disbanded, with the fortress being turned into a prison. One of the towers was used as a prison cell for Ustym Karmeliuk, a prominent peasant rebel leader of the early 19th century, who managed to escape from it three times. In 1798, Polish nobleman Antoni Żmijewski founded a Polish theater in the city. It was one of the oldest Polish theaters. In 1867 the Diocese of Kamianets-Podilskyi was abolished by the Russians authorities. It was re-established in 1918 by Pope Benedict XV.

Due to its remote location near the tripoint of Russia, Austria and Romania, as well as the absence of a railway connection, which would appear only in 1914, the city stagnated during most of the 19th century, remaining an administrative centre with an economy based on crafts. According to the Russian census of 1897, Kamianets-Podilskyi remained the largest city of Podolia with a population of 35,934.

At the same time, the city had a large degree of cultural importance, with the local seminary producing several notable Ukrainian activists, such as Stepan Rudansky, Mykola Leontovych, Anatoli Svydnytsky and Mykhailo Kotsiubynsky. An archaeological society and a museum were established here by Yukhym Sitsinskyi. In 1906, the local society "Prosvita" was established in the city, thanks to its activities, the study of the Ukrainian language was introduced in primary and parish schools. In 1914, a direct railway line linked the city to Proskurov.

Lithograph of Napoleon Orda between 1862 and 1876

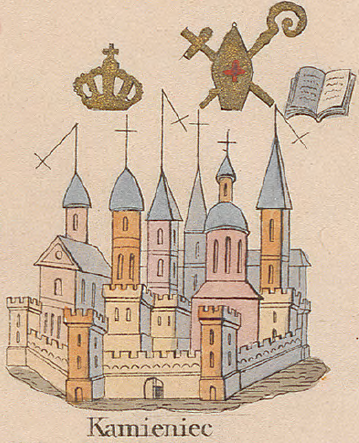
Kamianets on the map of Zygmunt Gerstmann, 1863

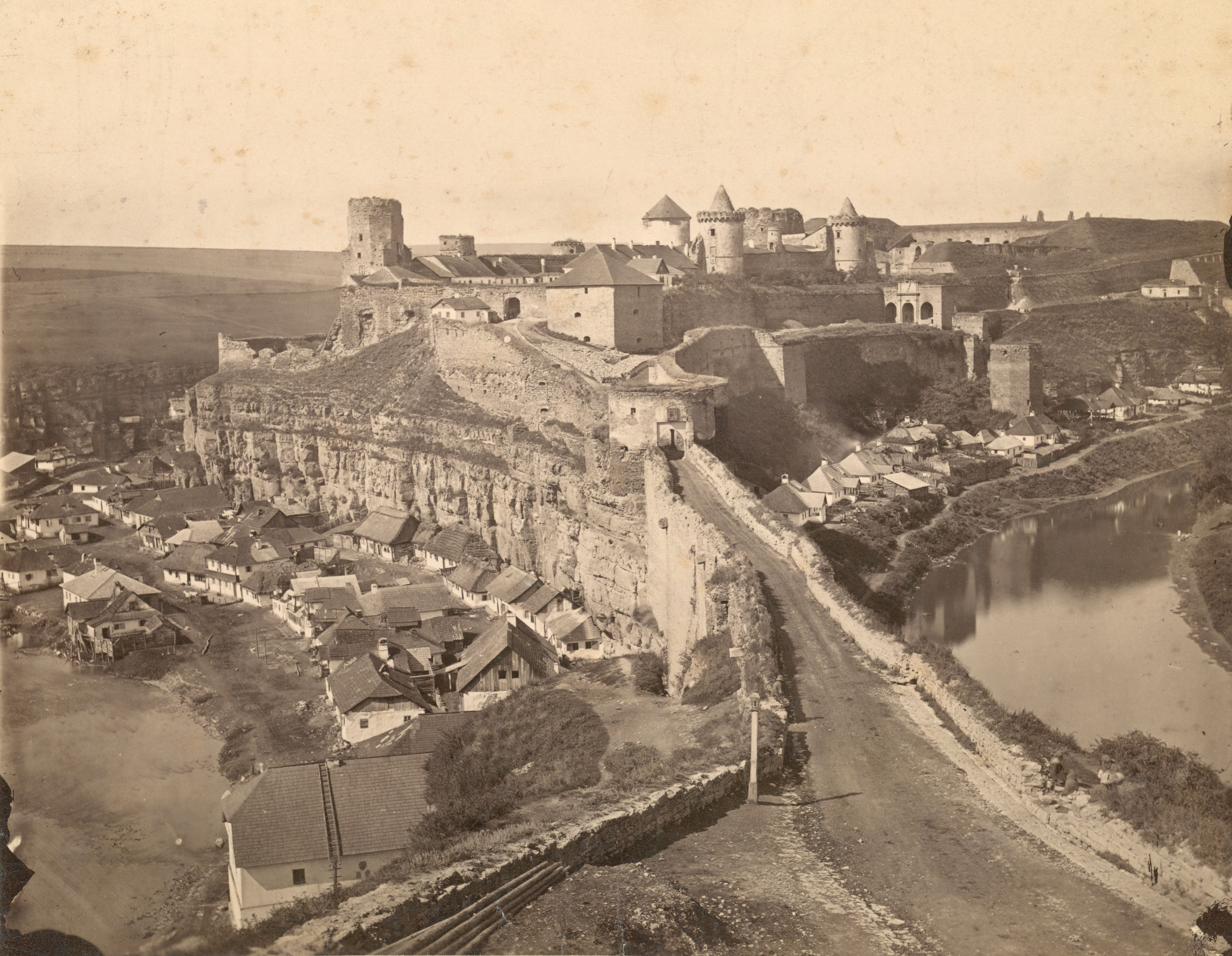
Kamianets-Podilskyi fortress 1865

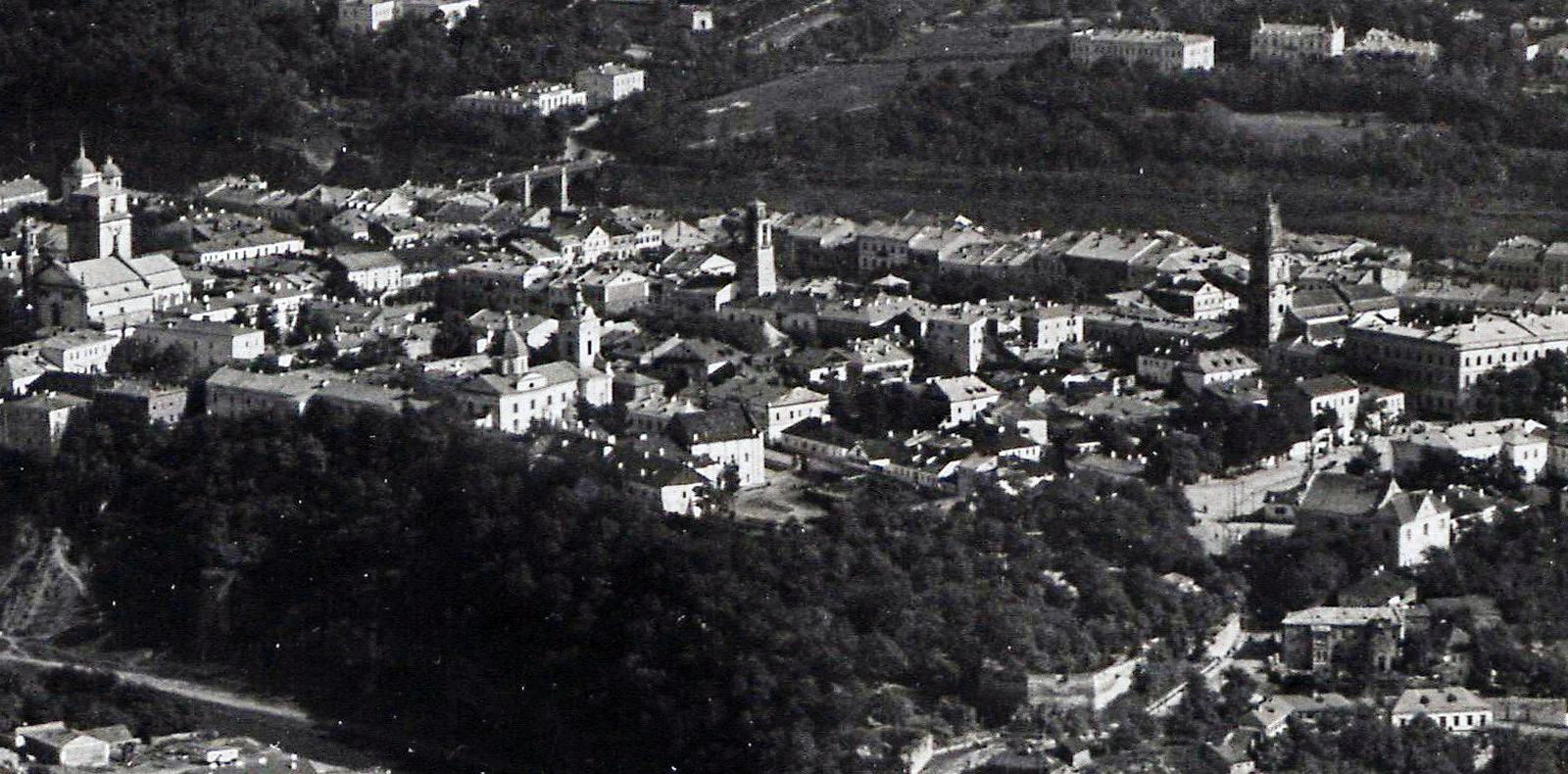
Kamenets from a height, the beginning of the 20th century

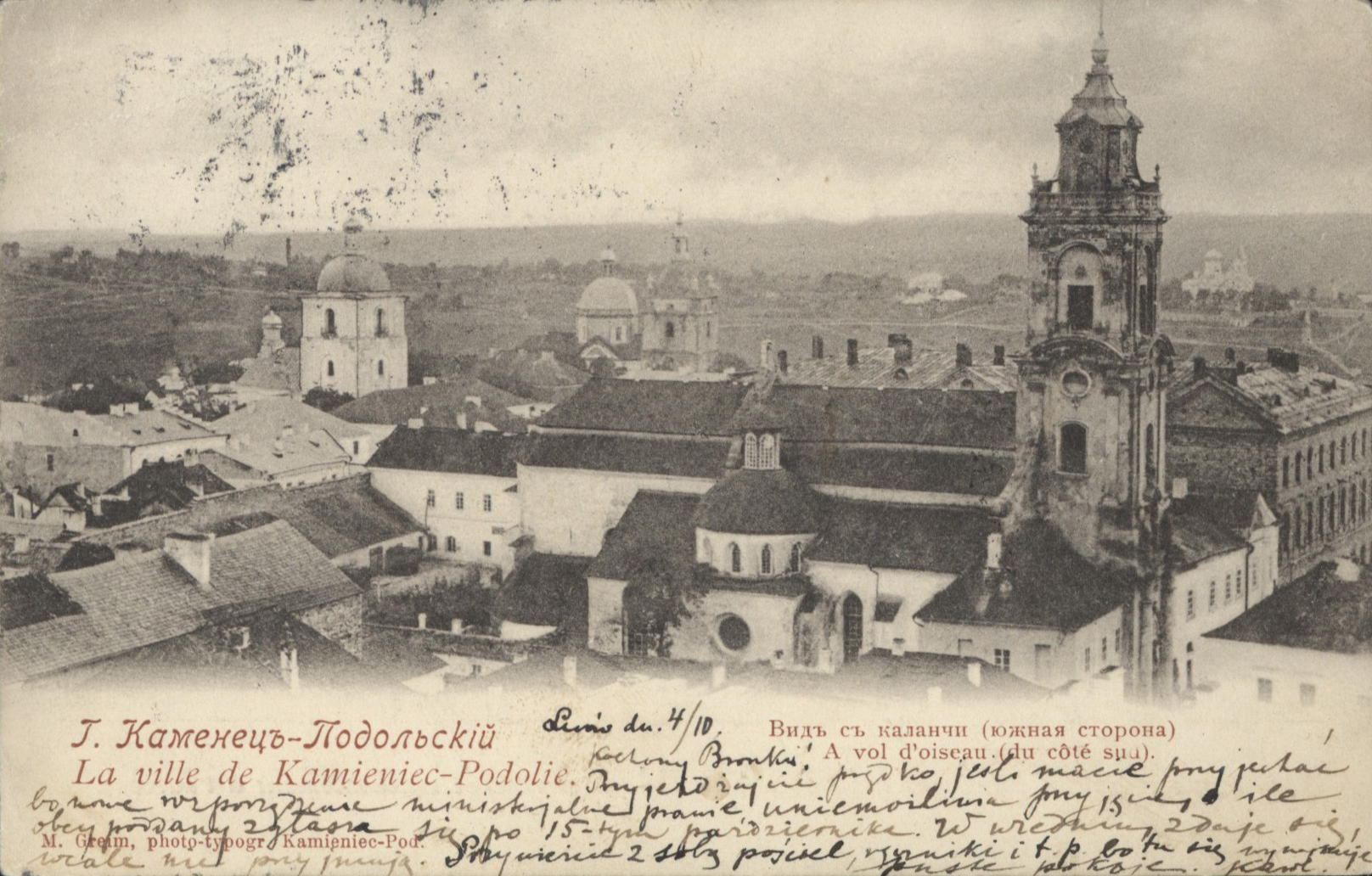
Church of St. Nicholas, 1902

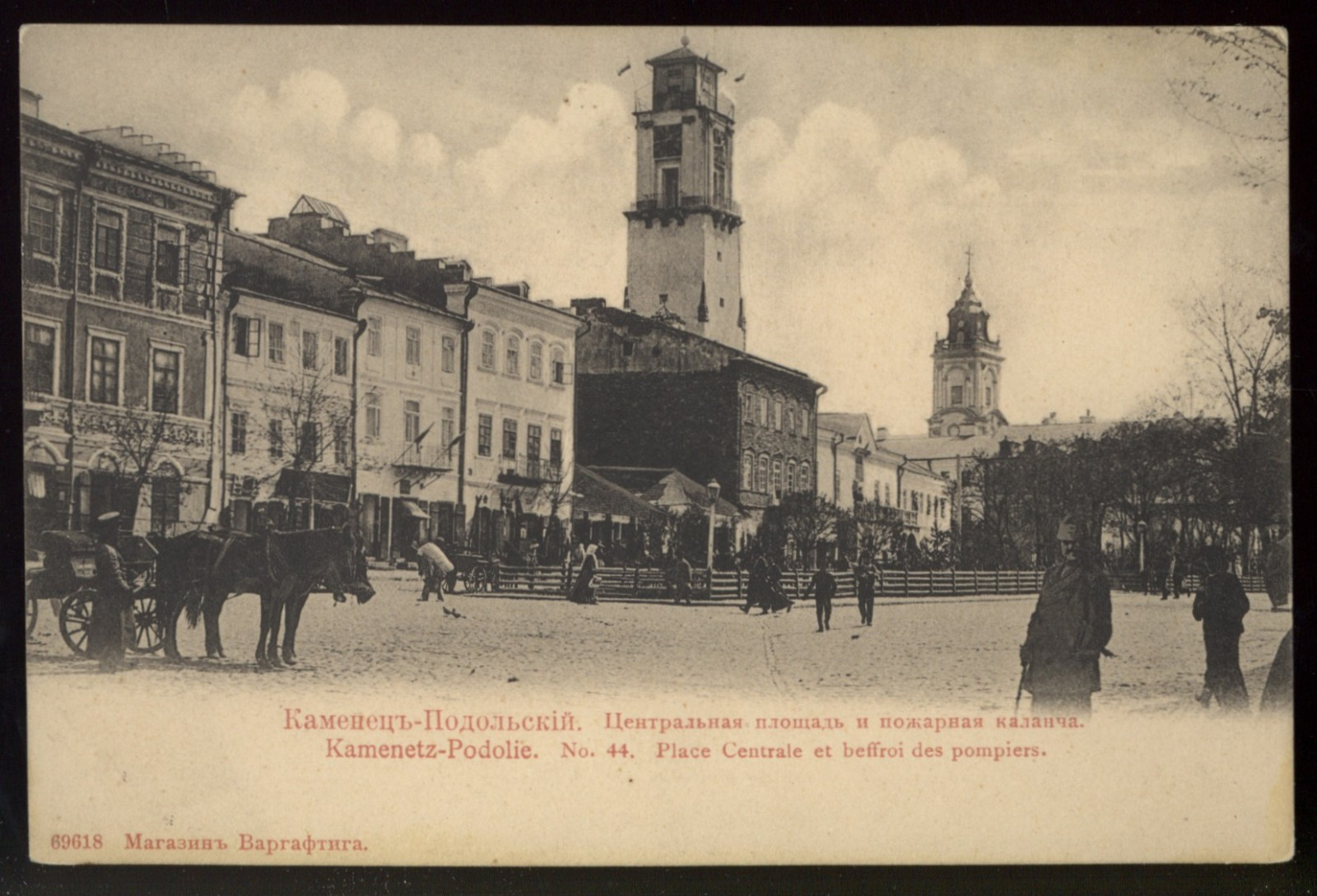
Polish market, centralny plac, 1906

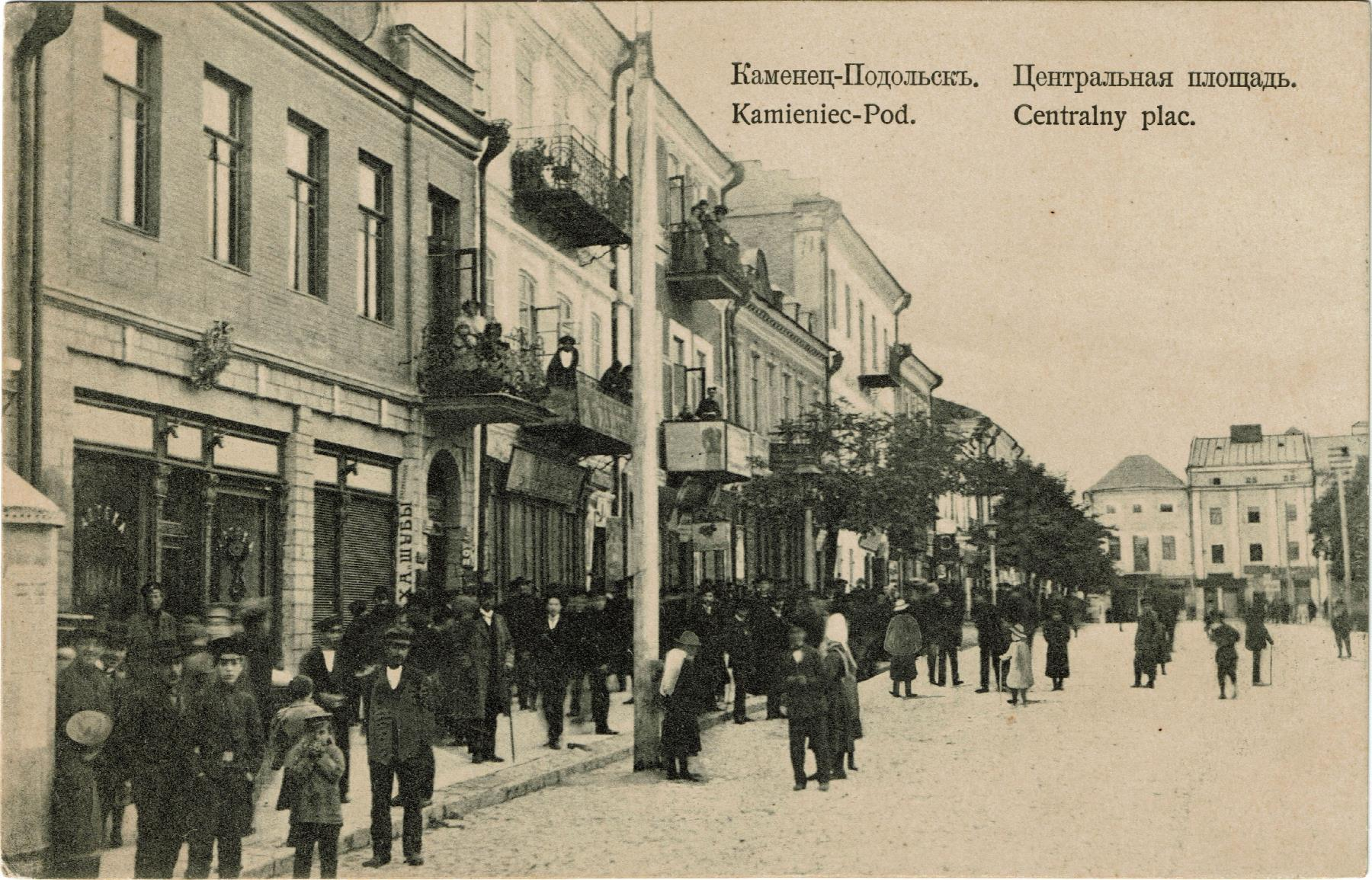
Centralny plac, 1906-1910

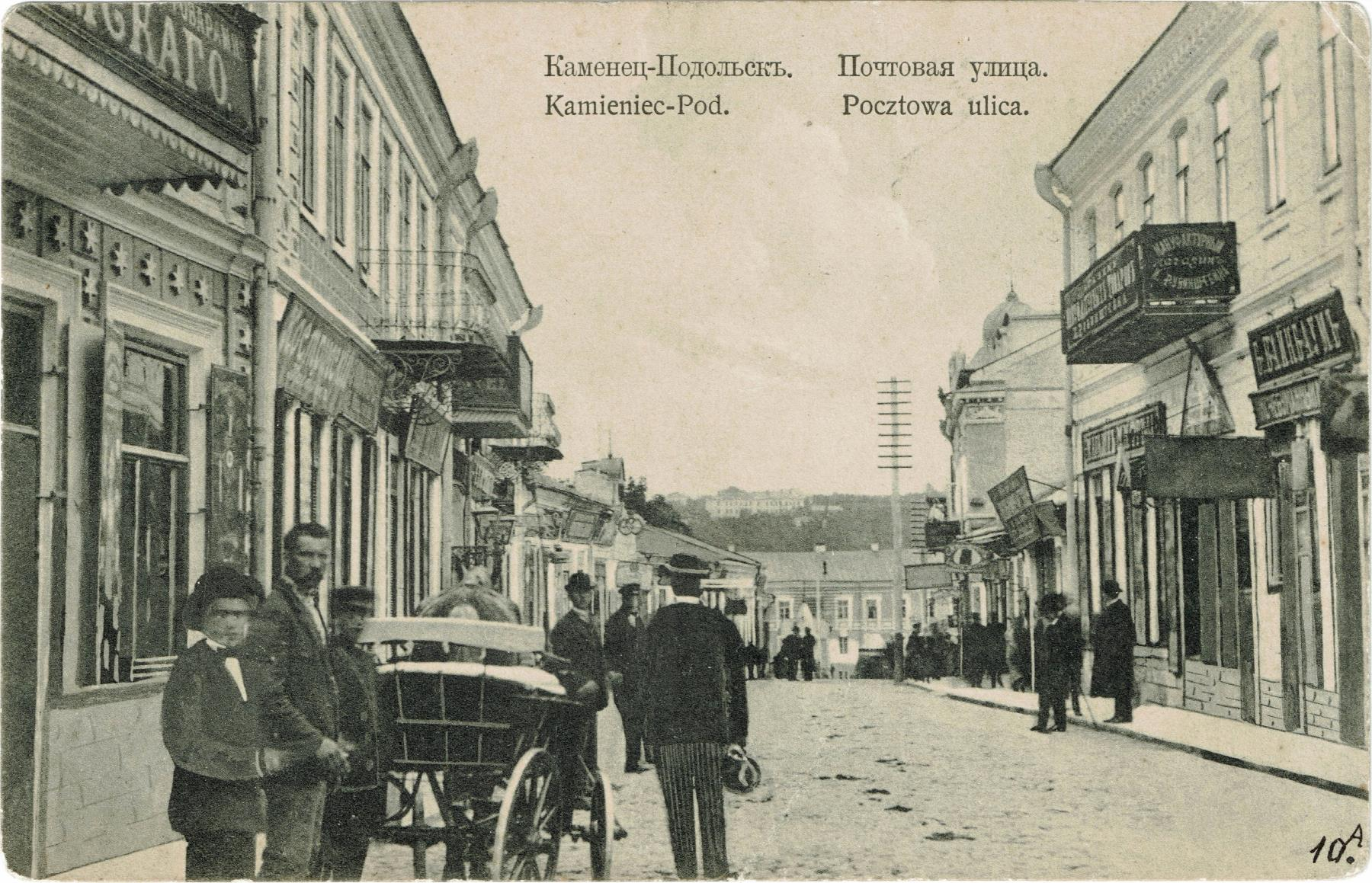
Postova Street, to the right of the Jewish shops, Old Town, 1910

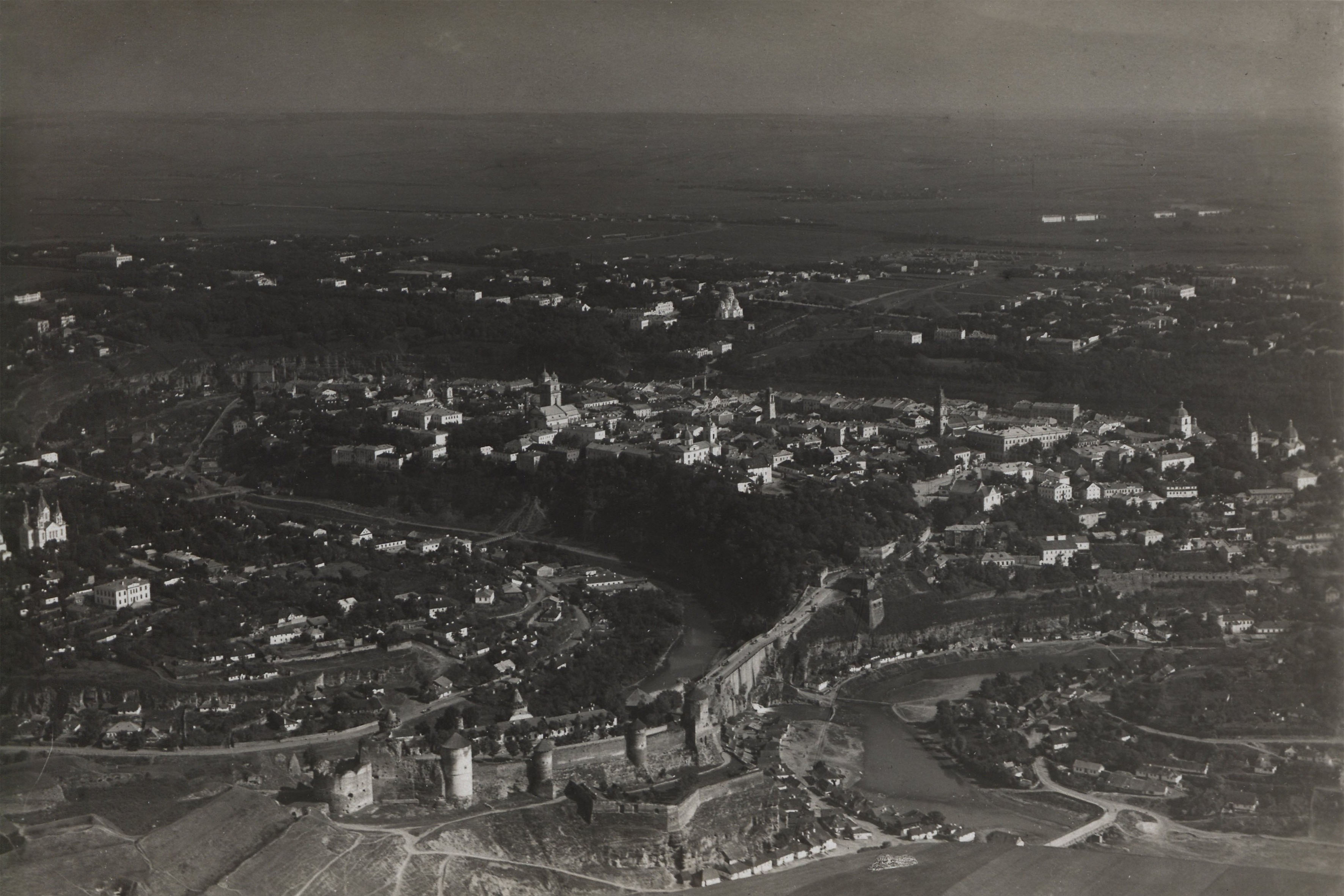
Kamianets-Podilskyi aerial survey, 1914

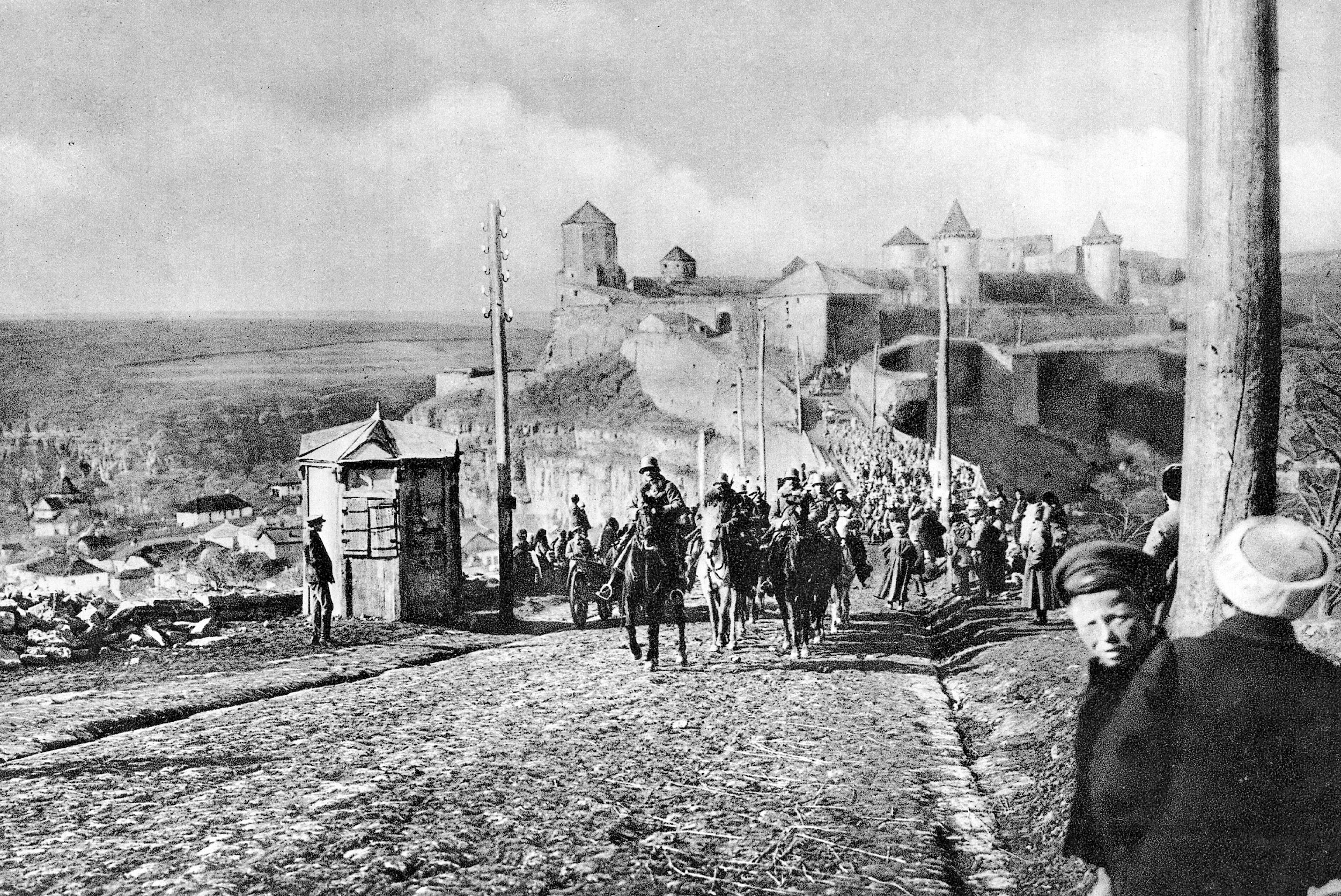
Austro-Hungarian troops enter the Kamianets-Podilskyi, 1918

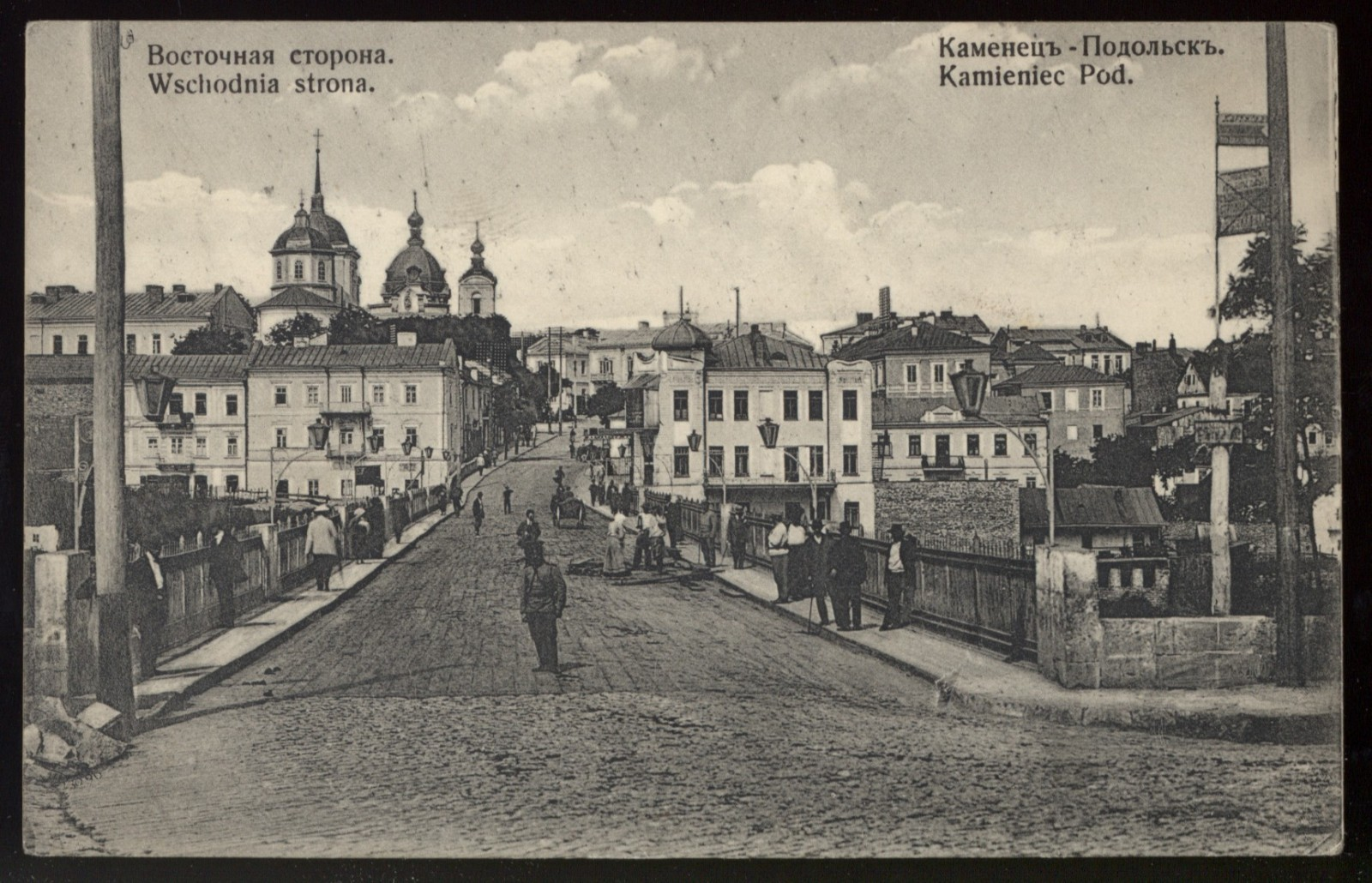
Kamianets-Podilsky bridge, 1918

=== World War I and Ukrainian People's Republic ===
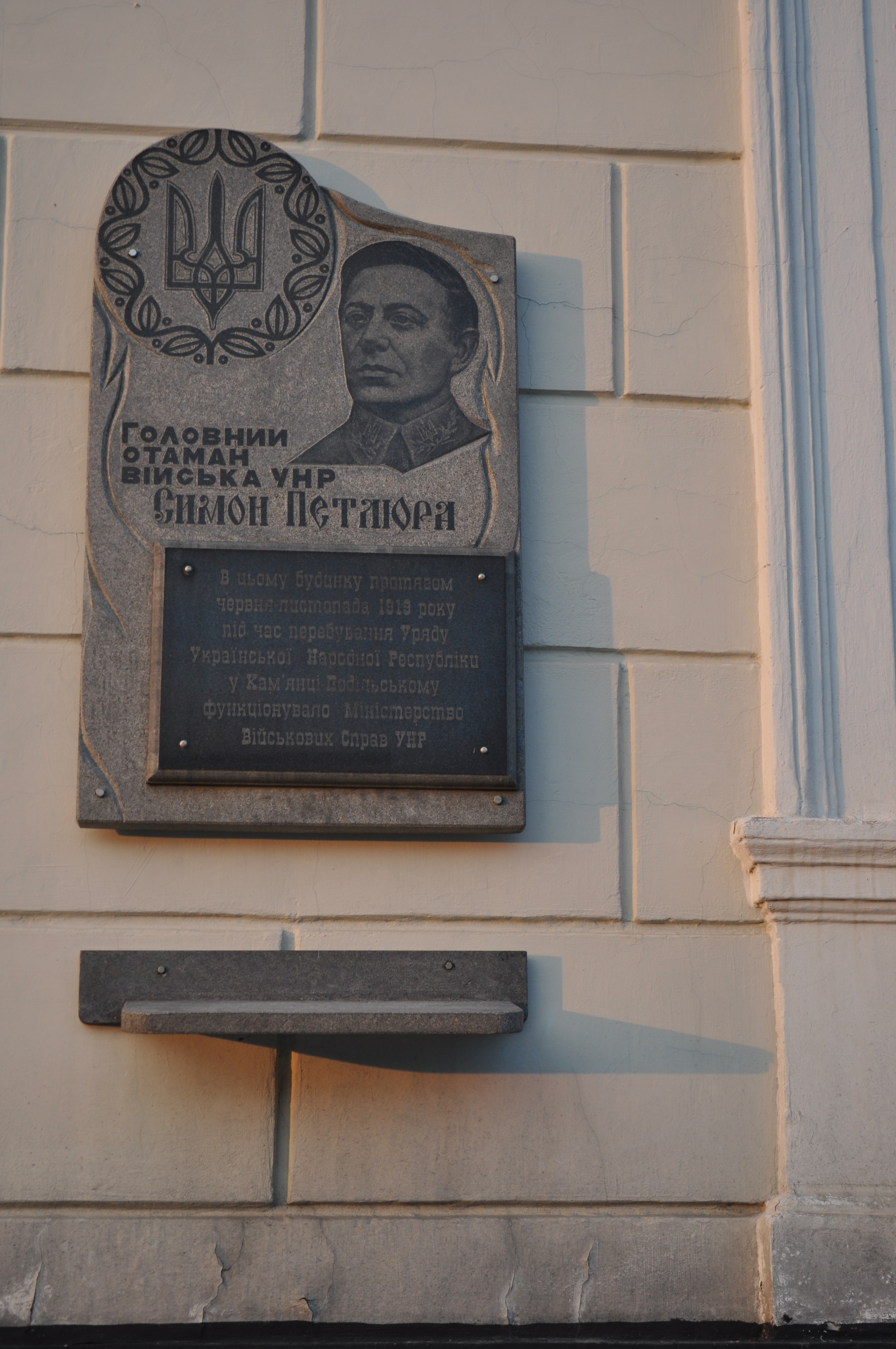
Symon Petliura memorial plaque

During World War I, the city was occupied by Austria-Hungary in 1915.

After the collapse of the Russian Empire in 1917, the city was briefly controlled by the Ukrainian People's Republic and the Hetmanate. On 6 March 1918, the city became the seat of the newly established Podillia zemlia of the Ukrainian People's Republic, which was disbanded on 29 April 1918 by Hetman of Ukraine Pavlo Skoropadsky, who brought back old governorate divisions of the Russian Empire. During that period a university was established in the city.

During the Directorate period, the city was chosen as de facto capital of Ukraine after the Russian communist forces occupied Kyiv. In 1919 it also served as the seat of government of Western Ukraine. During the Polish-Soviet War, the city was captured by the Polish Army on the night of 16–17 November 1919 and was under Polish administration from 16 November 1919, to 12 July 1920 as capital of the Podolian District.

In July 1920 battles between units of the Army of the Ukrainian People's Republic (UPR) and the Red Army took place in the village Veliki Zozulyntsi and surrounding villages nearby Kamianets-Podilskyi. On 7 July 1920 soldiers of the 6th Reserve Rifle Brigade of the UPR Army were taken prisoner by the Bolsheviks. After refusing to join the Red Army, captured UPR soldiers were executed. In Veliki Zozulintsi a mass grave of 26 UPR soldiers is located.

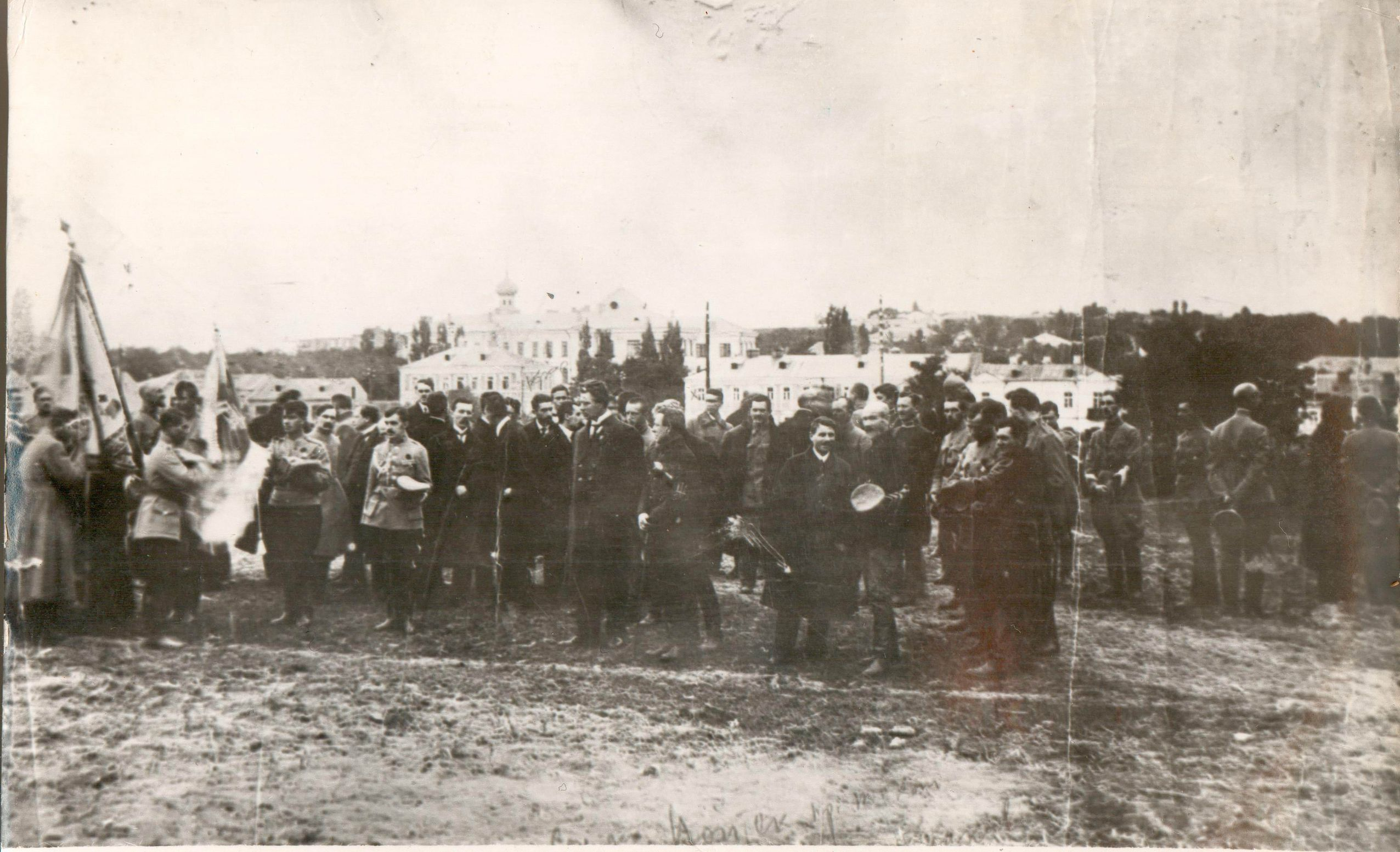
Taking the oath of the Army of the Ukrainian People's Republic in the city of Kamianets-Podilskyi in 1919

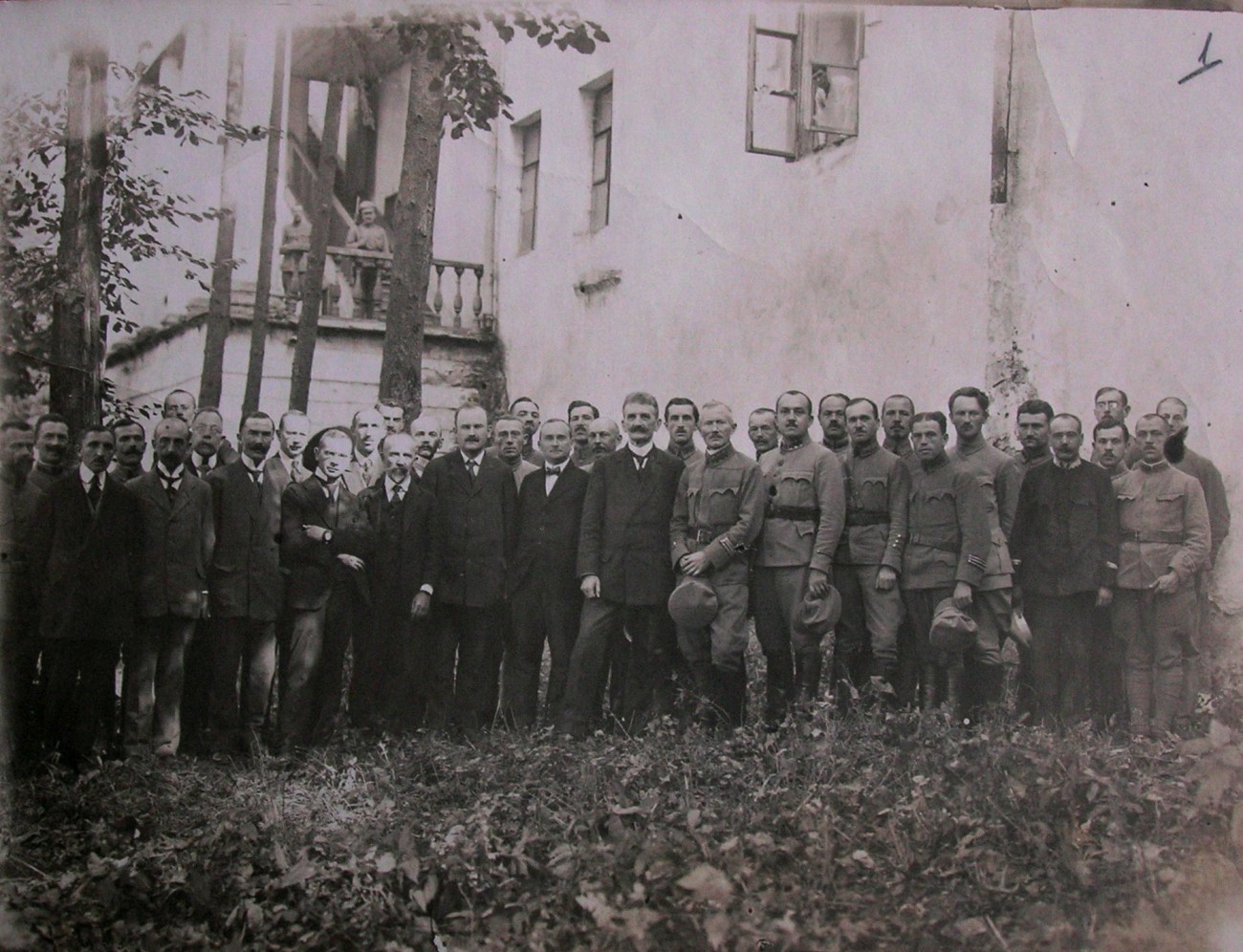
The government of the ZUNR in Kamianets-Podilskyi, 1919

=== Soviet rule (1921–1991) ===
In late 1920, after the defeat of the Ukrainian People's Republic in the Ukrainian-Soviet war, the city was occupied by the Red Army. The area including Kamianets-Podilskyi was ceded to Soviet Ukraine in the 1921 Treaty of Riga, which determined its future for the next seven decades as part of the Ukrainian SSR. Afterwards, it was administratively part of the Podolia Governorate of Ukraine.

Poles, Jews and Ukrainians have always dominated the city's population. However, as a commercial center, Kamianets-Podilskyi has been a multiethnic and multi-religious city with substantial Armenian minority. Under Soviet rule it became subject to severe persecutions, and many Poles were forcibly deported to Central Asia. Massacres such as the Vinnytsia massacre have taken place throughout Podolia, the last resort of independent Ukraine. Early on, Kamianets-Podilskyi was the administrative center of the Ukrainian SSR's Kamianets-Podilskyi Oblast, but in 1940 the administrative center was later moved to Proskuriv (now Khmelnytskyi).

In December 1927, TIME Magazine reported that there were massive uprisings of peasants and factory workers in southern Ukraine, around the cities of Mohyliv-Podilskyi, Kamianets-Podilskyi, Tiraspol and others, against Soviet authorities. The magazine was intrigued when it found numerous reports from the neighboring Romania that troops from Moscow were sent to the region and suppressed the unrest, causing no less than 4,000 deaths. The magazine sent several of its reporters to confirm those occurrences which were completely denied by the official press naming them as barefaced lies. The revolt was caused by the collectivization campaign and the lawless environment in the cities caused by the Soviet government.

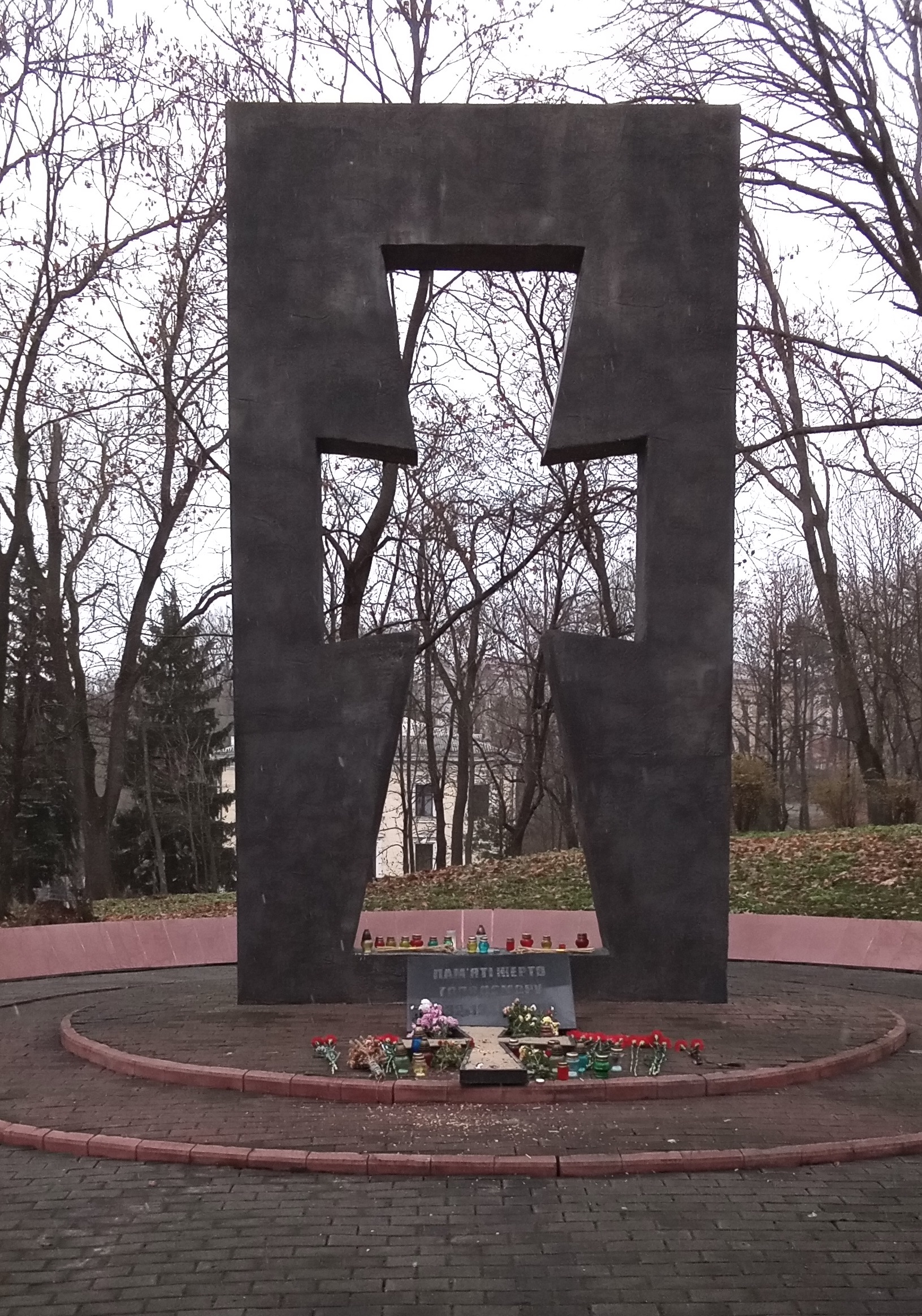
Monument to the victims of the 1932-1933 famine in Kamianets-Podilskyi

The Holodomor of 1932-1933, a terrible crime of the totalitarian system, did not escape the city. Although the situation was somewhat better than in other regions, this was largely due to the proximity of the border with the modern western Ukrainian territories. Given the border status of Kamianechchyna, the population, especially from the villages located on the Zbruch River, tried to move to the modern western regions. There, Podolians exchanged their belongings for bread and grain. There were many cases when people were hired for the opportunity to eat or worked for bread. However, not everyone was able to do this: along the border with Poland along the Zbruch River and the border with Romania along the Dniester River, barricading lines were set up in many places, and Soviet punitive bodies were guarding the borders. The situation was also difficult in the city, according to data in 1932-1933, 585 people died of hunger.

During the years of the Great Terror, namely 1937-1938, 9,009 people of various nationalities and professions were convicted in Kamianets-Podilskyi, 62 people were arrested on charges of espionage, and hundreds of people were evicted from the city by the families of "enemies". people", for example 101 families of Polish nationality (see Polish Operation of the NKVD). For example, on the territory of the Catholic Church of Archangel Michael, in the former monastery of the Dominican sisters, the Soviet authorities set up a prison, and in its dungeon - a torture chamber. In the 1930s, most of all, in 1937, people were shot in the basements of the monastery. According to some memories, for example, up to a hundred people were brought in a day. Twenty were sent to camps in the north, the rest disappeared. During this period, 11,634 Polish and German families, or at least 46,500 citizens, were evicted from Podolia.

==== World War II ====
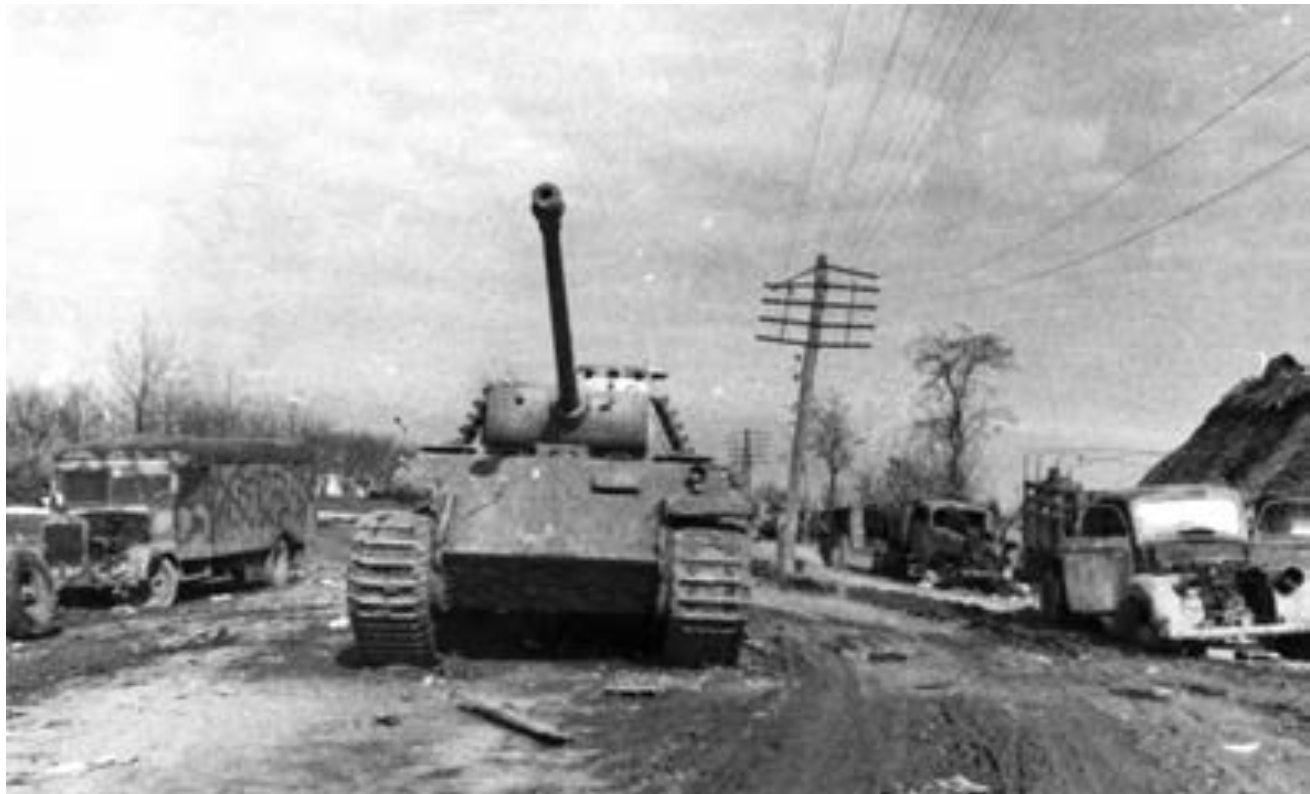
Abandoned German Panther tank and vehicles in the Kamenets-Podolsk region, 1944

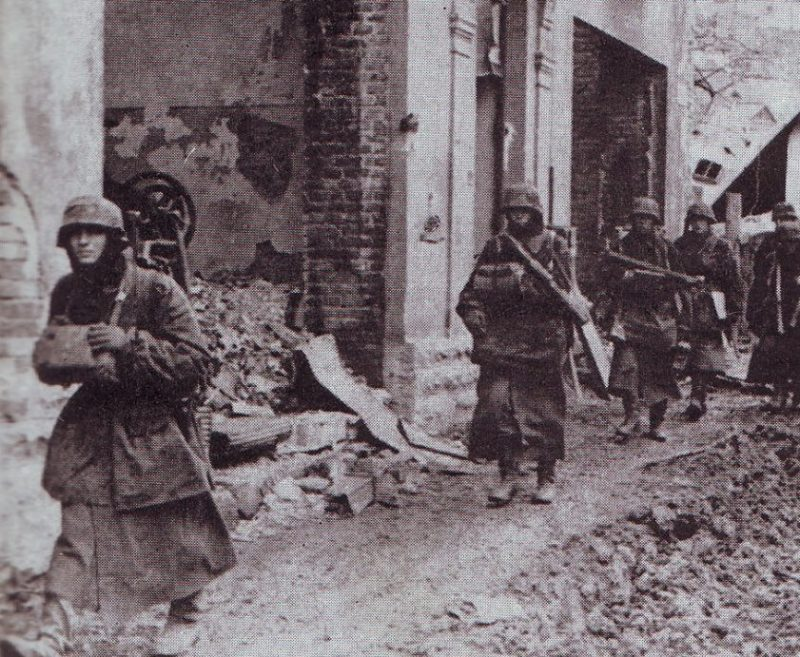
German soldiers on the streets of Kamenets-Podolsky, March 1944

Following the Soviet invasion of Poland at the start of World War II, the administrative center of the oblast was moved from the city of Kamianets-Podilskyi to the city of Khmelnytskyi.

Kamianets-Podilskyi was occupied by the German troops on 11 July 1941 in the course of Operation Barbarossa. German, Ukrainian, and Hungarian police massacred 23,000 Jews 27–28 August 1941. The Germans operated a Nazi prison and a forced labour camp in the city.

On 26 March 1944, the town was re-occupied by the Red Army after German occupation in the battle of the Kamenets-Podolsky pocket. After the capture of the city by the Soviet army, the population's disloyalty to the Soviet government was manifested not by a desire to continue the fight against the Nazis, but people were tired of the difficult periods of the German-Soviet war. But the Red Army launched active mobilization measures from the very first days of entering the city. Such measures significantly reduced the quality of the selection of conscripts, and also negatively affected the level of their training. The pernicious practice of their immediate use in hostilities began from the first days of mobilization, therefore a significant number of mobilized residents of Kamianets and local villages died in the subsequent phases of the Dnieper–Carpathian offensive in the territory of neighboring regions. Sending poorly trained, and most often poorly dressed and armed people into battle was more reminiscent of a cruel act of revenge for the disloyalty to the Stalinist government shown in 1941, for such units a conventional name appeared - «Chornopidzhachnyky». Thereafter Kamianets remained in Soviet Ukraine until the Dissolution of the Soviet Union.

==== Ukrainian Insurgent Army ====
A structural network of the OUN functioned on the territory of the city: Kamianets-Podilsky District, which belonged to the UPA-South. During the German occupation, Ukrainian national forces formed local self-government bodies: the regional administration, the regional department of education. Hryhoriy Kybets was appointed the head of the regional administration.

In 1944-45, the 19th tactical division of the Kamianets UPA, the Lysonya military district, and the UPA-West military group operated on the territory of Kamianechchyna in 1944-45. The department was later divided into two parts in the summer of 1945. And self-defense bush units of the UPA from Ternopil Oblast also went on raids.

=== Soviet rule after 1944 ===
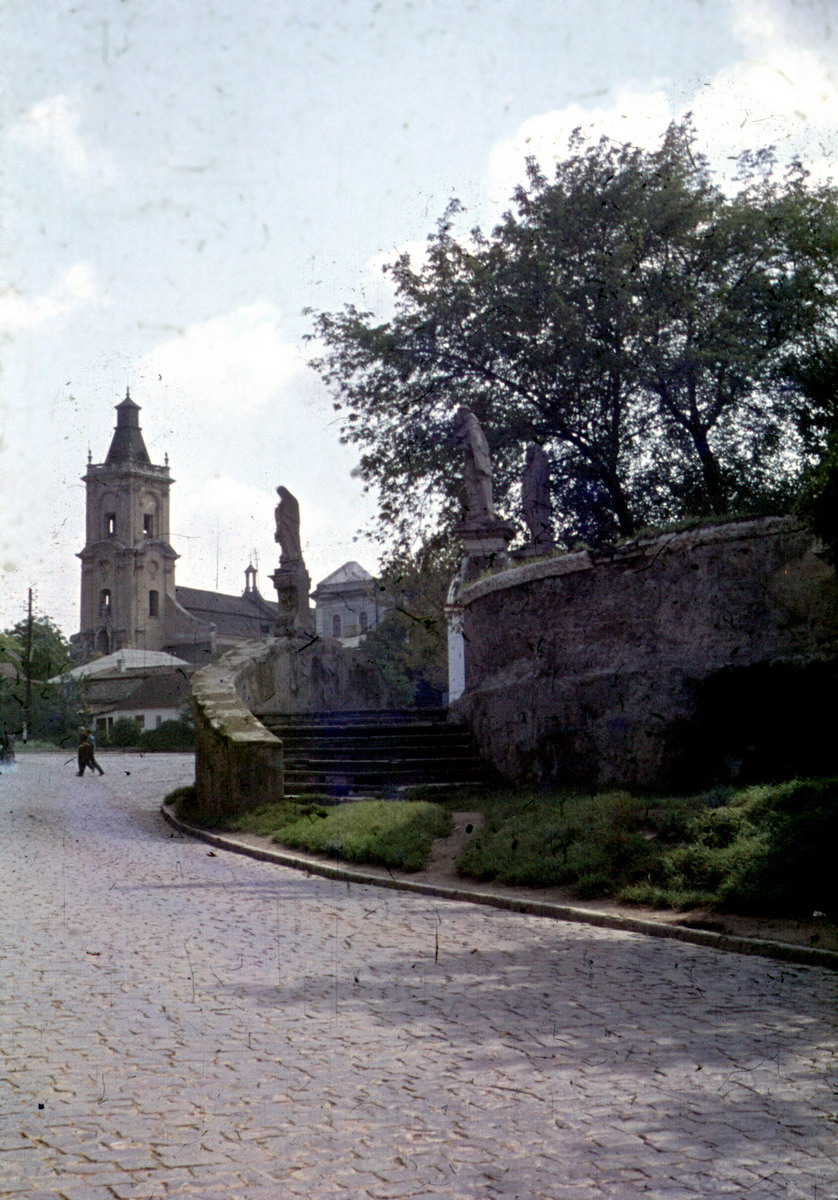
Street view from 1972

In 1946 Kamianets-Podilskyi Castle received the status of a monument of all-Union importance. In 1954-1955 restoration works were performed on the old city hall.

In 1986, the population of the city reached 100,000 people; according to this indicator, Kamianets moved from the category of medium to large cities.

In 1989, the Cultural Landscape of the Canyon in Kamianets-Podilskyi was listed on the Tentative List of World Heritage Sites in Ukraine.

On 16 July 1990, the new Ukrainian parliament adopted a declaration of sovereignty. On 16 October 1990, a rally was held in the city in support of the students of Kyiv, who announced a hunger strike as a sign of protest against the government's policies. In the central square of the city, the demands of the students to the Verkhovna Rada of the Ukrainian SSR regarding the adoption of laws on local self-government and the non-signing of the Union Treaty, and to the City Council regarding the raising of the blue-yellow flag were approved. On 16 October the presidium of the city council satisfied the students' demand and was the first in Khmelnytskyi Oblast to raise the national flag.

On 16 January 1991, Pope John Paul II re-established the Diocese of Kamianets-Podilskyi, which was dissolved under Soviet rule.

=== Independent Ukraine ===
Since 24 August 1991, Kamianets-Podilskyi has been part of independent Ukraine and is a significant economic, cultural, educational and tourist center of the state.

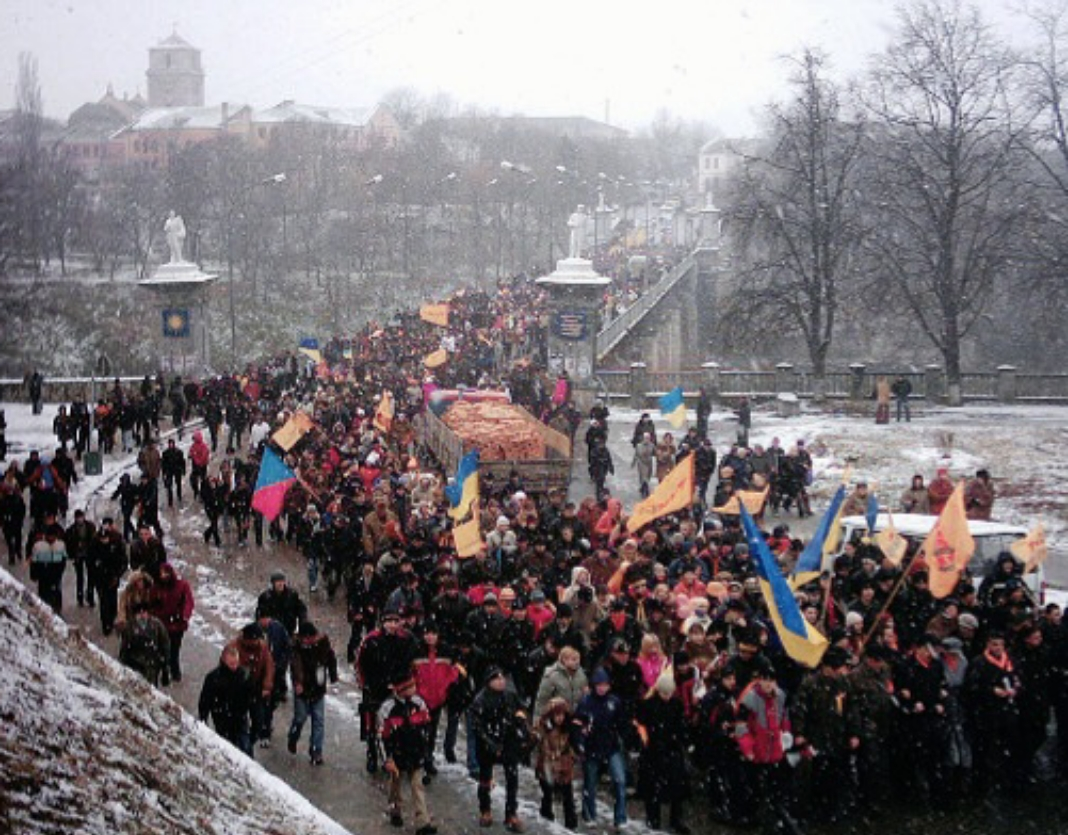
Orange Revolution in Kamianets, 2004

In 2004, residents of the city actively participated in the Orange Revolution, people held rallies on the Renaissance Square.

On 1 December 2013, city students from the Ivan Ohiienko National University, Podolia State Agrarian and Technical University and other educational institutions protested in the city, marching in a column through the streets and forming a viche near the city council, they expressed their anger at the authorities for their arbitrariness.

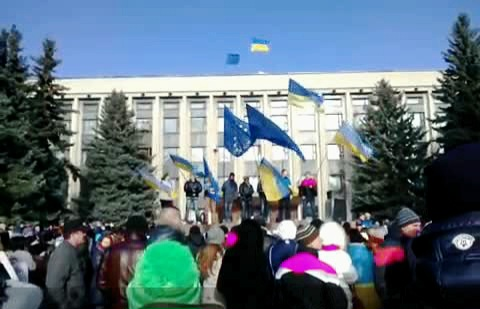
Euromaidan in Kamianets-Podilskyi, 2013

In the following weeks, many residents of the city gathered every day for vigils under the city council to express their protests against the regime and to support the Euromaidan in Kyiv. The largest rally in terms of numbers took place on 26 January 2014, about 2,000 people took part in it.

As of 2015, Kamianets-Podilskyi was the third-largest city of Podolia after Vinnytsia and Khmelnytskyi. In 2015, the city center completed the construction of the European Square, where the flags of the European Union countries fly, according to officials, this will be a confirmation of the European choice of the city and Ukraine.

Until 18 July 2020, Kamianets-Podilskyi was incorporated as a city of oblast significance and served as the administrative center of Kamianets-Podilskyi Raion though it did not belong to the raion. In July 2020, as part of the administrative reform of Ukraine, which reduced the number of raions of Khmelnytskyi Oblast to three, the city of Kamianets-Podilskyi was merged into Kamianets-Podilskyi Raion.

The Russian invasion of Ukraine began on the morning of 24 February 2022, during rocket fire.

==== European integration of the city and cooperation with the European Union ====
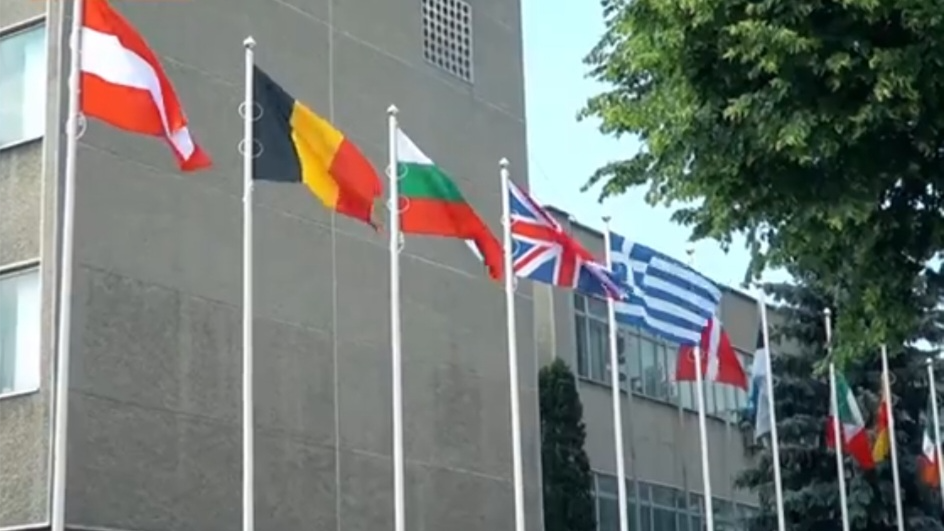
European Square in Kamianets-Podilskyi

In 2015, the construction of the European Square was completed in the city center, where the flags of the European Union countries fly, according to officials, this will be a confirmation of the European choice of the city and Ukraine.

Thanks to the EU program Mayors for Economic Growth, and cooperation with the public organization Eidos: Centre for Political Studies and Analysis, the city received a grant of 1.8 million hryvnias to support small and medium-sized enterprises, conduct seminars, business trainings, and promote products.

==== Decolonization in the city ====
Until 2022, the fight against the Soviet past began with the removal of the Lenin monument from its pedestal on 18 August 1992. The decommunization of the squares, streets and alleys of Kamianets-Podilskyi partially took place in 1990-1993. In 2016, the process was continued in the city 14 streets and 16 alleys were renamed. The streets were renamed on: Heroes of the Heavenly Hundred, Heroes of the Krut, Andrey Sheptytsky, Ustym Karmaliuk, Roman Shukhevych, Jan de Witte and others.

After the 2022 Russian invasion, scholars of Eastern Europe have renewed awareness of Russian colonialism and interest in decolonizing scholarship.

In the first stage of 2022, 18 streets, five squares and one park were given new names in the city. This is how the streets of Kvitka Cisyk, Yevhen Konovalets, Stepan Bandera, Ivan Mazepa, Pavlo Skoropadskyi, Yaroslav the Wise, Heroes of Mariupol and the fallen participants of the full-scale Russian invasion of Ukraine appeared. A Soviet tank from its pedestal and communist symbols were also dismantled.

In the second stage of 2023, 29 streets and 11 alleys received new names. The streets were renamed on: Heroes of the ZSU, Heroes of the UPA, Sichovykh Striltsiv, Solomiya Krushelnytska, Liubomyr Huzar, Petro Sahaidachny, Volodymyr Ivasyuk, Oleksandr Koshyts, John Paul II, alleys: Dmytro Vyshnevetsky, Myroslav Skoryk, Gustaw Belke (zoologist), Vasyl Stefanyk and others. More than 80 toponyms changed their names in the villages of the hromada.

=== Jewish history ===
==== Before World War II ====
During the Khmelnytsky Uprising (1648–58), the Jewish community of Kamianets-Podilskyi suffered much from Khmelnytsky's Cossacks on the one hand, and from the attacks of the Crimean Tatars (their main object being the extortion of ransoms) on the other.

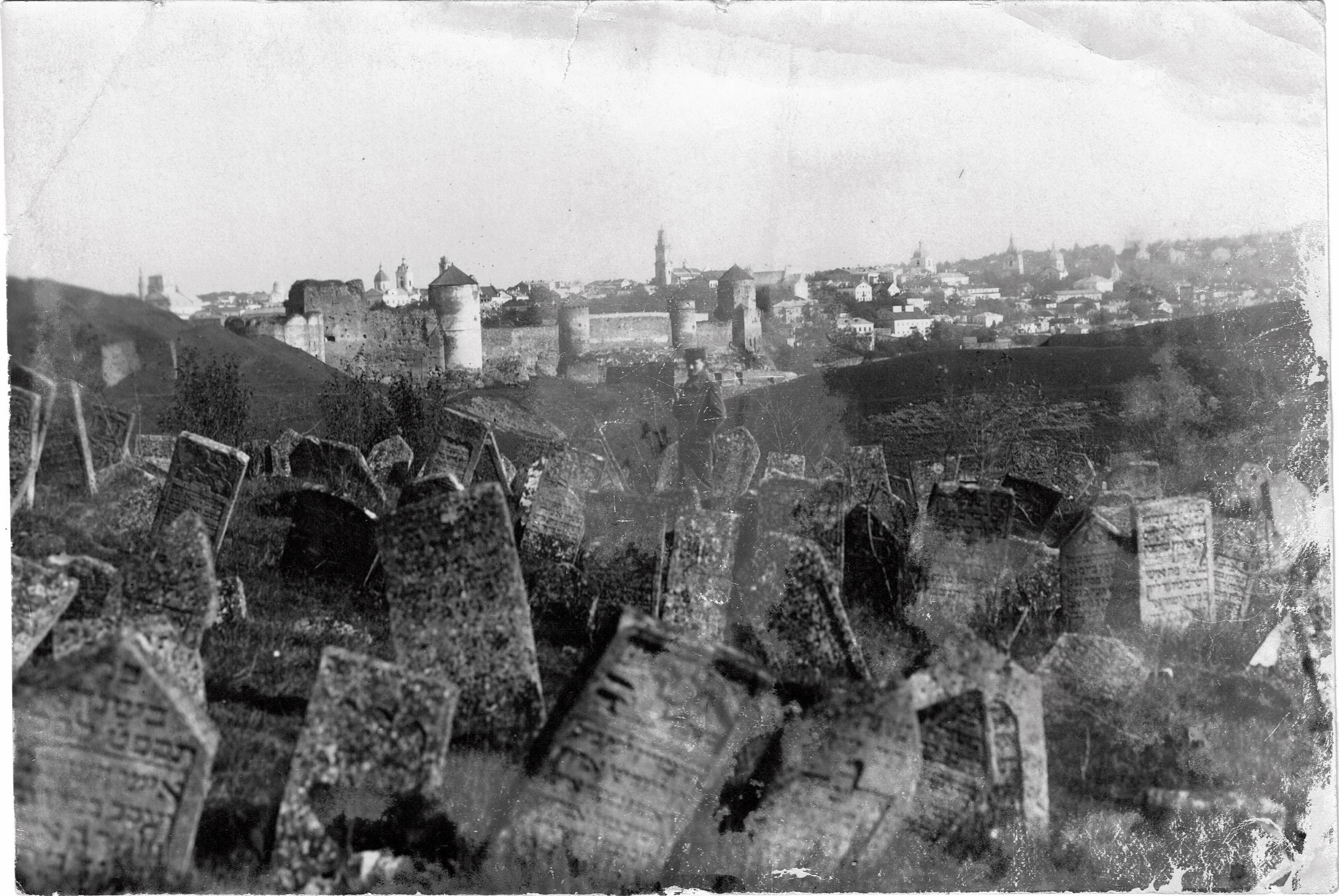
Old Jewish cemetery

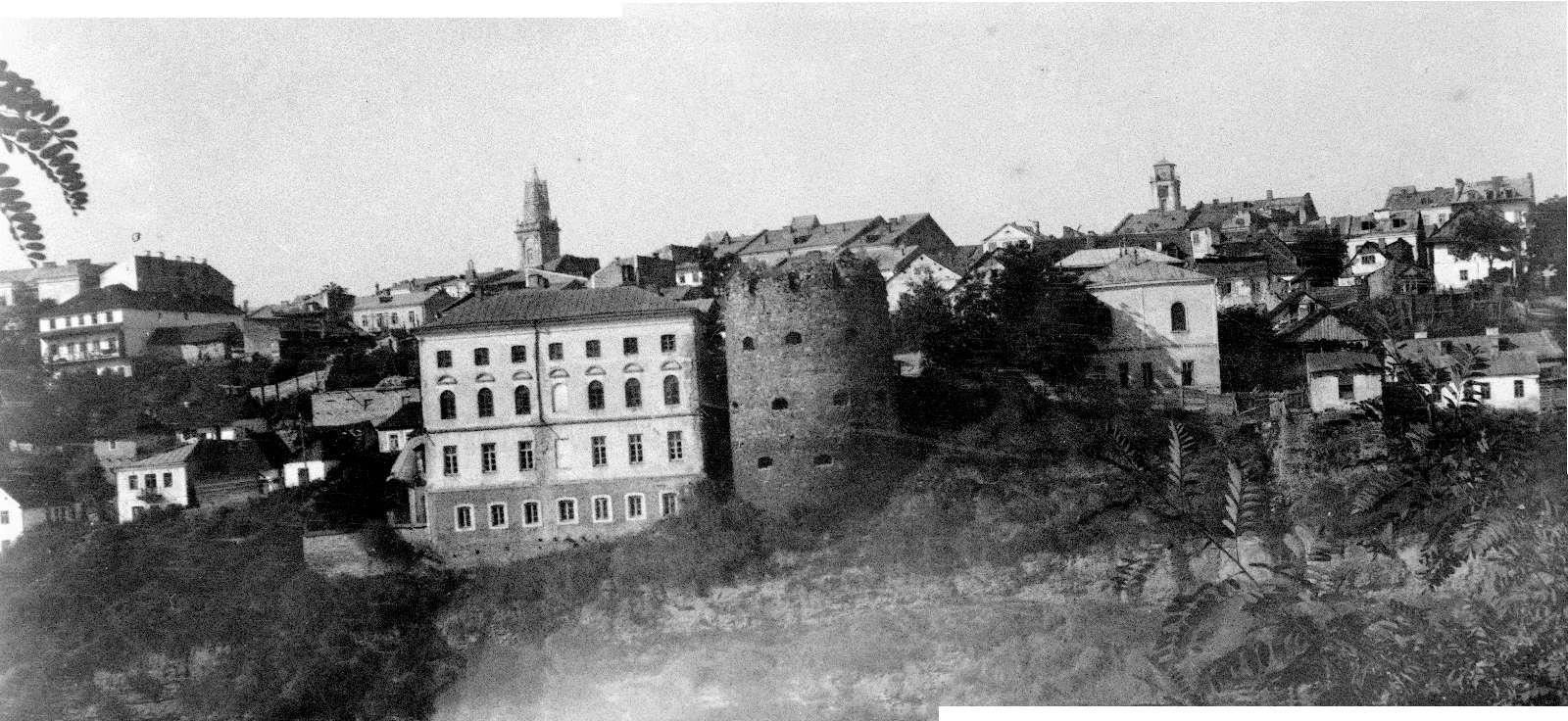
Jewish synagogue

About the middle of the 18th century, Kamianets-Podilskyi became celebrated as the center of the furious conflict then raging between the Talmudic Jews and the Frankists. The city was the residence of Bishop Dembowski, who sided with the Frankists and ordered the public burning of the Talmud, a sentence which was carried into effect in the public streets in 1757.

Kamianets-Podilskyi was also the residence of the wealthy Joseph Yozel Günzburg. During the latter half of the 19th century, many Jews from Kamianets-Podilskyi emigrated to the United States, especially to New York City, where they organized a number of societies.

On 1 July 1910, more than 48 percent of the city's residents were Jews. The city was located in the settlement zone that the Russian Empire had set aside for Jews.

==== The Holocaust in Kamianets-Podilskyi ====
One of the first and largest Holocaust massacres carried out in the opening stages of war between Nazi Germany and the Soviet Union, took place in Kamianets-Podilskyi on 27–28 August 1941. The killings were conducted by the Police Battalion 320 of the Order Police along with Friedrich Jeckeln's Einsatzgruppen, the Hungarian soldiers, and the Ukrainian Auxiliary Police. According to Nazi German reports, in two days a total of 23,600 Jews from the Kamianets-Podilskyi Ghetto were murdered, including 16,000 expellees from Hungary. As the historians of the Holocaust point out, the massacre constituted a prelude to the Final Solution conceived by the Nazis at Wannsee several months later. Eyewitnesses reported that the perpetrators made no effort to hide their deeds from the local population.

== Geography ==
=== Location and cityscape ===
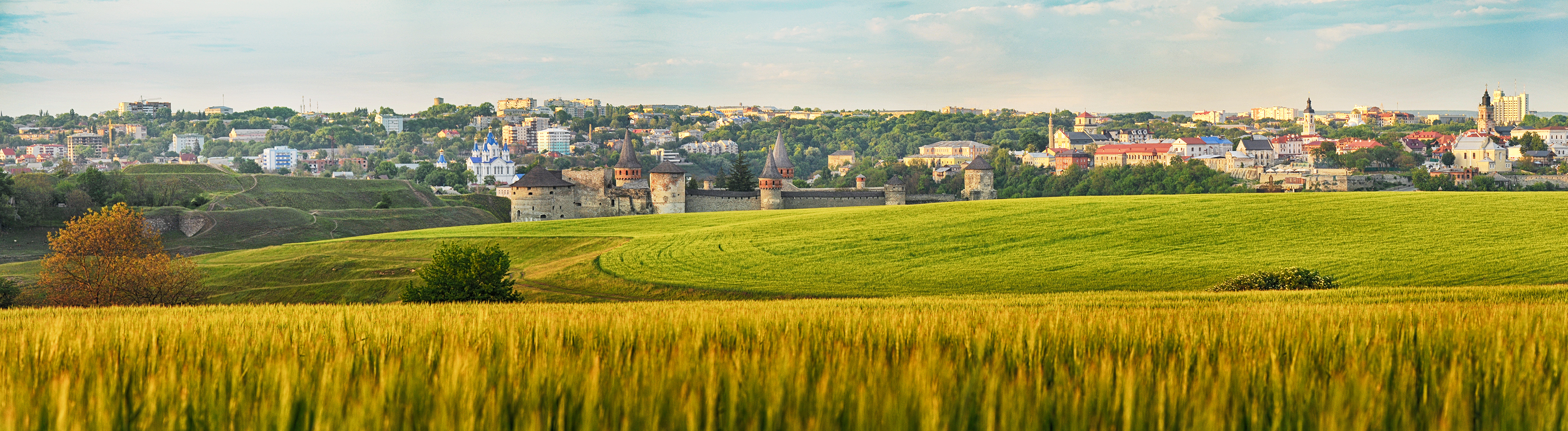
Panorama of Kamianets-Podilskyi with the Castle (foreground), the Old Town (to the right) and the New Plan area (background)

Kamianets-Podilskyi is located in the southern portion of the Khmelnytskyi Oblast, in the western Ukrainian region of Podolia. The area where the city is located is part of the Podolian Upland which is notable for its elevated places known as Tovtry (see Podilski Tovtry National Nature Park) and creating a canyon-like relief feature.

The city stands upon the Smotrych River, 18 kilometers from its confluence with the Dniester. The total area of the city comprises 27.84 square kilometers (10.7 sq mi). Among other notable neighboring cities, Kamianets-Podilskyi is located about 101 kilometres (62.8 mi) from the oblast's administrative center, Khmelnytskyi and across Dniester in southwestern direction 88 kilometres (54.7 mi) from Chernivtsi, the administrative center of the neighboring Chernivtsi Oblast.

Kamianets-Podilskyi consists of several parts: the Old Town, located on a rock plateau in the loop of Smotrych river and separated from the castle area with a deep canyon; the new part ("New Plan"), built according to a regular project; and former suburbs such as Ruski Filvarky and Polski Filvarky.

=== Climate ===
Kamianets-Podilskyi is located within a humid continental climate with warm summers.

Climate data for Kamianets-Podilskyi (1981–2010)
Month	Jan	Feb	Mar	Apr	May	Jun	Jul	Aug	Sep	Oct	Nov	Dec	Year
Mean daily maximum °C (°F)	−0.3 (31.5)	1.4 (34.5)	7.0 (44.6)	14.9 (58.8)	21.2 (70.2)	23.7 (74.7)	25.7 (78.3)	25.2 (77.4)	19.9 (67.8)	13.7 (56.7)	6.0 (42.8)	0.6 (33.1)	13.3 (55.9)
Daily mean °C (°F)	−3.3 (26.1)	−2.2 (28.0)	2.4 (36.3)	9.2 (48.6)	15.1 (59.2)	17.9 (64.2)	19.8 (67.6)	19.0 (66.2)	14.1 (57.4)	8.6 (47.5)	2.7 (36.9)	−2.1 (28.2)	8.4 (47.1)
Mean daily minimum °C (°F)	−6.4 (20.5)	−5.5 (22.1)	−1.7 (28.9)	3.9 (39.0)	9.3 (48.7)	12.4 (54.3)	14.2 (57.6)	13.4 (56.1)	9.1 (48.4)	4.3 (39.7)	−0.3 (31.5)	−5.0 (23.0)	4.0 (39.2)
Average precipitation mm (inches)	31.2 (1.23)	34.7 (1.37)	30.9 (1.22)	46.3 (1.82)	64.3 (2.53)	92.6 (3.65)	96.8 (3.81)	61.1 (2.41)	54.1 (2.13)	38.5 (1.52)	37.9 (1.49)	37.5 (1.48)	625.9 (24.64)
Average precipitation days (≥ 1.0 mm)	7.7	7.6	7.2	7.6	9.2	9.8	10.3	7.5	7.5	6.6	7.0	8.1	96.1
Average relative humidity (%)	85.3	82.9	76.6	68.0	67.5	72.7	73.5	73.6	77.3	80.7	85.3	86.4	77.5
Mean monthly sunshine hours	39.2	64.3	121.2	168.1	241.9	237.5	241.4	234.6	162.7	103.8	48.9	62.7	1,696.3
Source: World Meteorological Organization

== Population ==
Historical population
Year	Pop.	±% p.a.
1840	14,700	—
1862	18,900	+1.15%
1892	36,662	+2.23%
1897	35,934	−0.40%
1912	50,500	+2.29%
1921	26,600	−6.88%
1926	32,100	+3.83%
1939	36,400	+0.97%
1944	11,000	−21.28%
1956	33,000	+9.59%
1959	40,300	+6.89%
1970	57,000	+3.20%
1979	84,000	+4.40%
1989	102,200	+1.98%
1991	105,000	+1.36%
2001	99,610	−0.53%
2009	101,667	+0.26%
2011	103,036	+0.67%
2019	99,755	−0.40%
2022	96,896	−0.96%

At the end of the 16th century, 10-12 thousand people lived in the city (for comparison: in Kyiv - 15 thousand, in Lviv - 18 thousand). After Ottoman rule (1672–1699), the city's population decreased almost 10 times: from 700 houses to only 100 people.

In 1926 Kamianets-Podilskyi had 32,100 inhabitants, of whom 45% were Ukrainians, 40% Jews, 7% Russians and 6% Poles. In 1956 the city had 33,000 inhabitants.

According to the 1989 census, the city had a population of 102.2 thousand people, in 1990 - 103 thousand, in 1991 - 105 thousand. According to the data of the first all-Ukrainian population census in 2001, the population of the city was 99,610 people. By 2022 it had decreased to 96,896 (2022 estimate).

After the Russian invasion, the population increased due to displaced persons since 2022 and at various times reached 30-40 thousand people. As of 2024, 22 thousand internally displaced persons were officially registered, and the problem of building housing in the city for such people remains relevant. The city government is looking for investors, like "Hansen Village", who are willing to invest in the construction of housing for internally displaced persons or reconstruction of the non-residential buildings.

=== Language ===
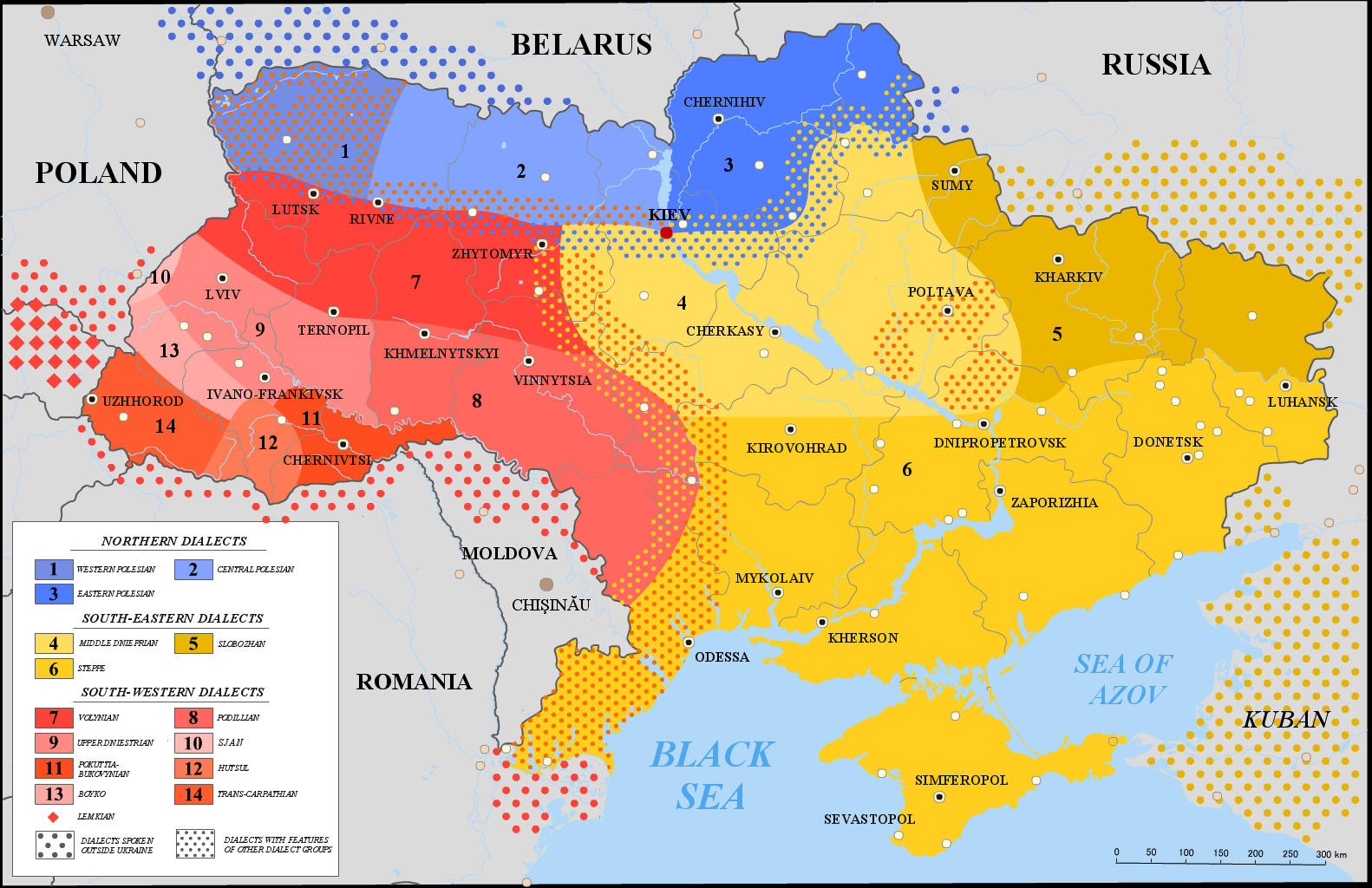
Map of Ukrainian dialects and subdialects (2005). Northern group Southeastern group Southwestern group

The city is located on the territory of the Podolian dialect, which belongs to the group of Volhynian-Podilian dialects of the southwestern group. The West-Podilian dialect, which has common features with the Dniestrian Ukrainian dialect, and the South-Podilian dialect, which has common features with the Pokuttia–Bukovina dialect, are common in the city.

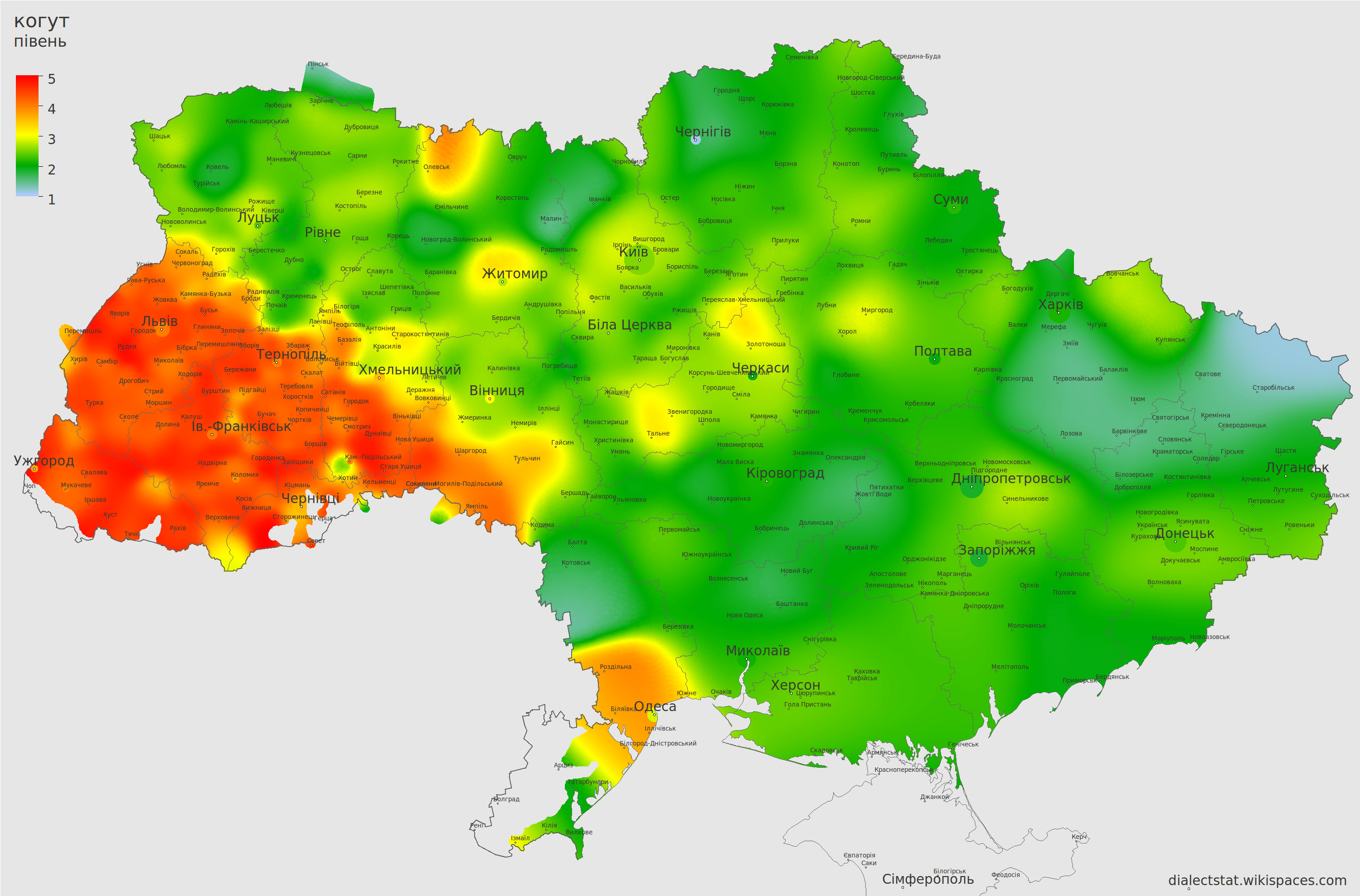
Usage of the word когут/кугут (kohut/kuhut) for rooster generally corresponds to the area where Podolian and other Southwestern Ukrainian dialects are spoken

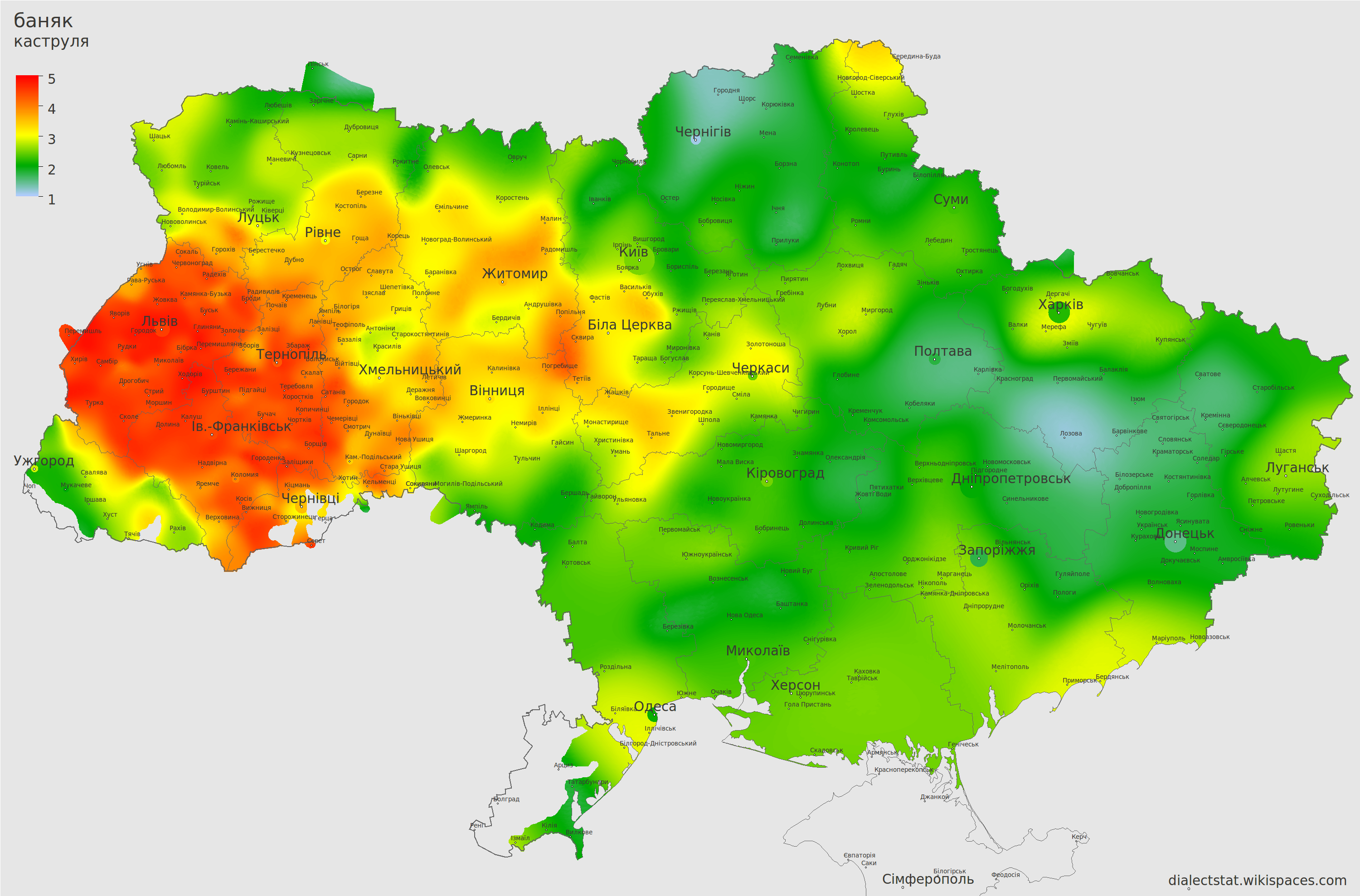
Areas with the most common usage of the word баняк (banyak) in Podolian and other Southwestern Ukrainian dialects

Dialectal words used in Kamianets-Podilskyi
Podolian dialect	Standard Ukrainian	English
най (nay)	хай, нехай (khay, nekhay)	"let it be"
когут/кугут (kohut/kuhut)	півень (piven')	rooster
рішча (rishcha)	хмиз (khmyz)	brashwood
заводять (zavod'at')	виють (vyyut')	(they) howl
шматок (shmatok)	кусок (kusok)	piece
варцаба (vartsaba)	одвірок (odvirok)	doorpost
баняк (banyak)	каструля (kastrulya)	sauce pan
бузьок (buzyok)	лелека (leleka)	stork
кнайпа (knaypa)	корчма (korchma)	bar, inn
писок (pysok)	рот (rot)	mouth

Kamianets-Podilskyi is included in the "Atlas of the Ukrainian Language".

Distribution of the population by native language according to the 2001 census:

Language	Percentage
Ukrainian	91.22%
Russian	7.08%
Polish	0.1%
Yiddish	0.02%
German	0.01%
other/undecided	1.57%

=== Ethnic groups ===
Ethnic composition of the city as of the Ukrainian national census in 2001:

Ethnic groups (2001)
	percent
Ukrainians	91.21%
Russians	5.89%
Poles	0.56%
Belarusians	0.27%
Jews	0.24%
Armenians	0.07%
Moldovans	0.06%
Tatars	0.05%
others	1.65%

== Religion ==
All major religious groups in Ukraine are represented in the city, a large part of Kamianets residents are Catholics, many are Orthodox. Throughout history, various Catholic monastic orders have functioned in Kamianets-Podilskyi: Dominicans, Franciscans, Jesuits, Capuchins, Discalced Carmelites, Brothers Hospitallers of Saint John of God, Trinitarians, and as of 2023, the city has Pauline orders and the Society of Christ.

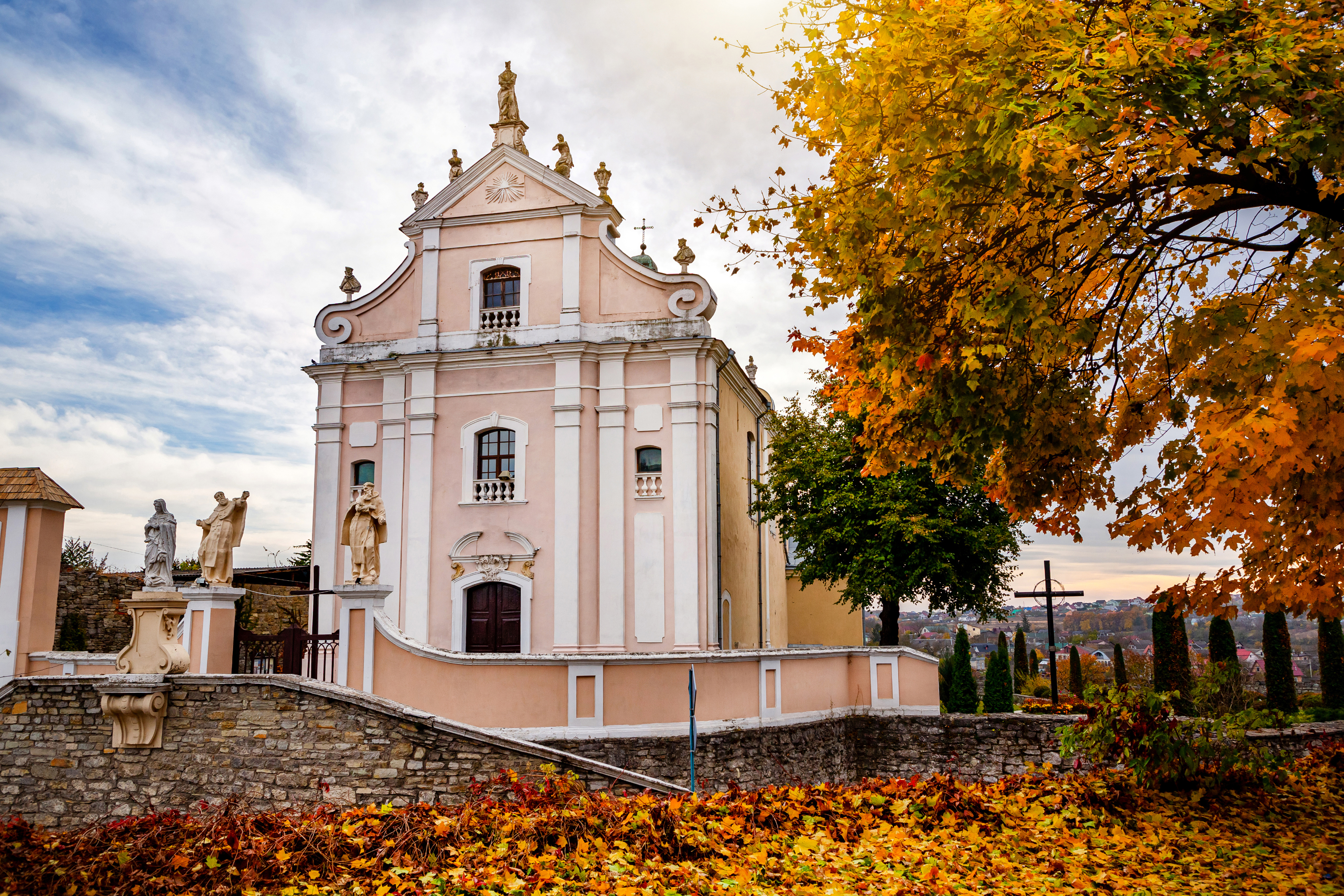
Trinity Church

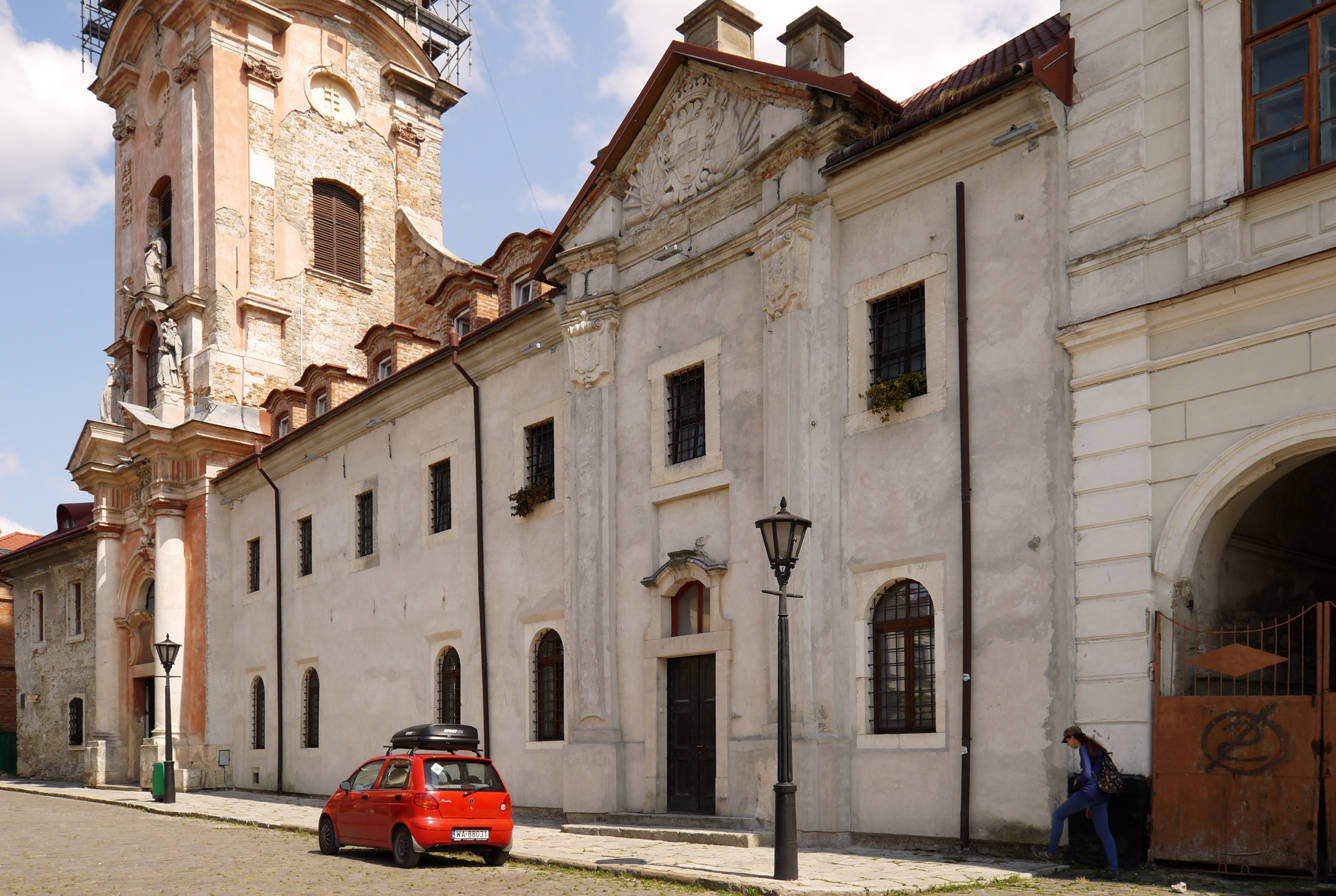
The refectory of the Dominican monastery

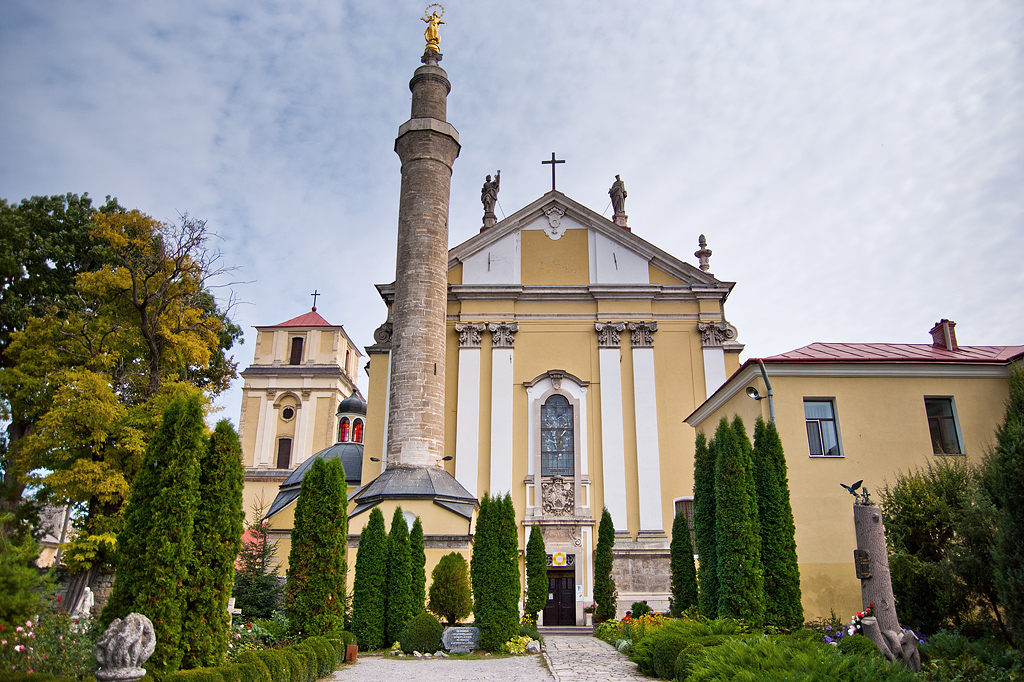
Church of Saints Peter and Paul

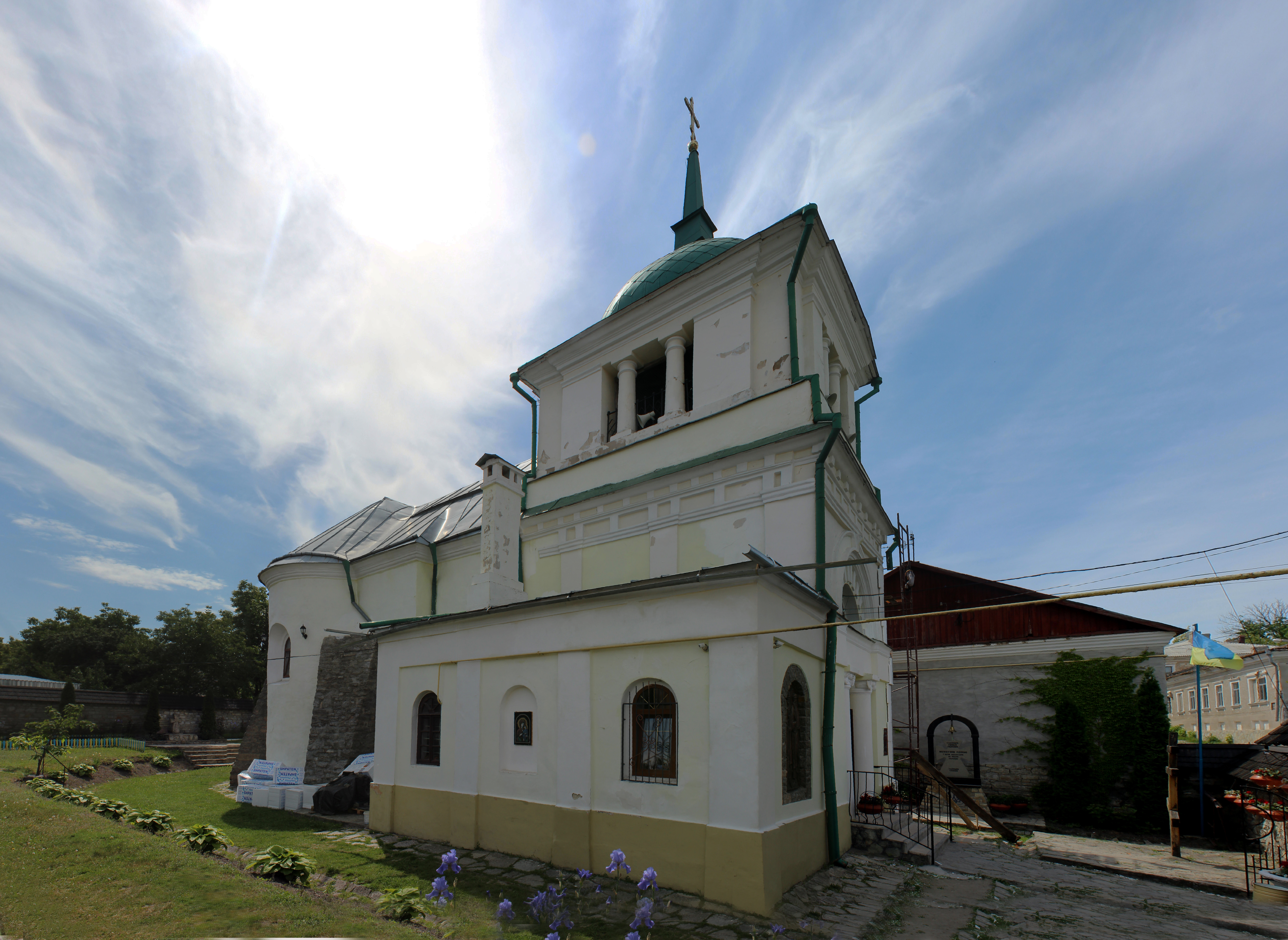
Church of the Holy Apostles Peter and Paul

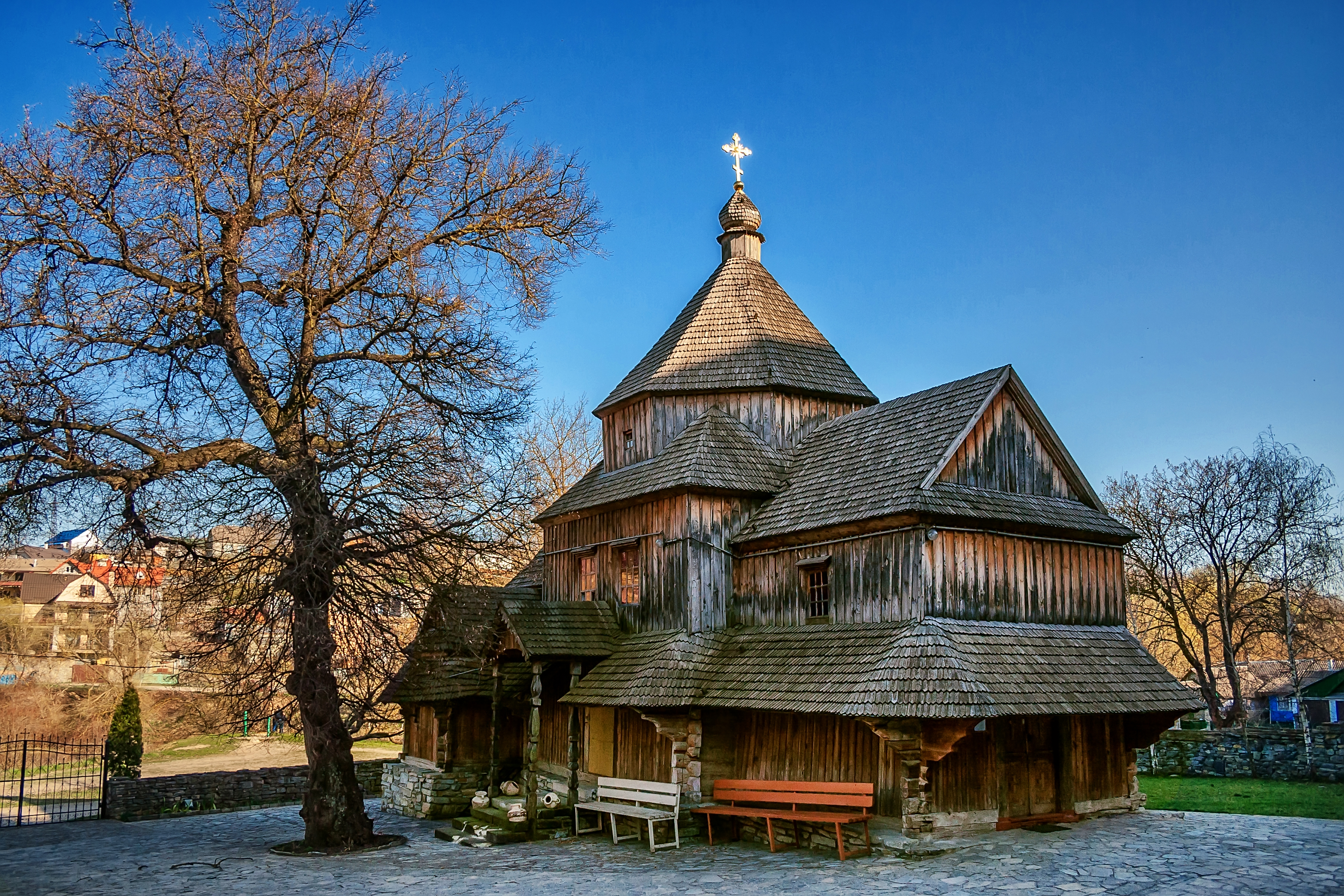
Church of the Exaltation of the Holy Cross

== Economy ==
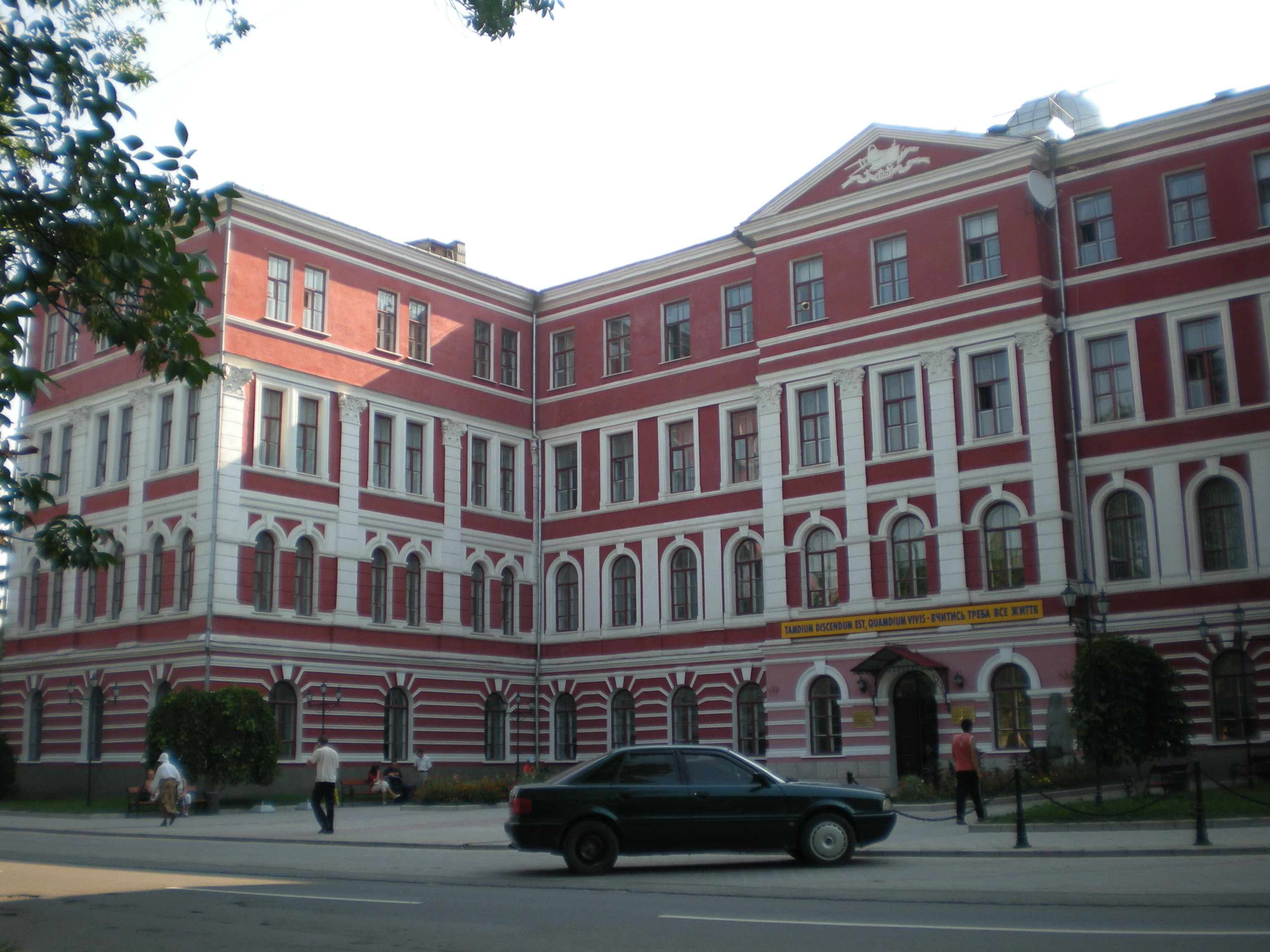
Ivan Ohiienko Kamianets-Podilskyi National University

The city has long had a developed industry, from folwarks to the brewery of baroness Evelina Junii. During the Soviet period, industrial machinery, canned goods, alabaster, tobacco and textiles were produced in the city. In modern times building materials and mechanical engineering, tool production, and the city also has enterprises in woodworking, in particular furniture, light (sewing, in particular sewing wedding dresses) and food (dairy) industries.

As of 2025, the city has focused on creating an industrial park and finding investors and partners to develop economic cooperation, which is presented on the city's economic map.

== Science and education ==
Kamianets-Podilskyi houses a university, an agricultural school and several technical schools. The city also has a botanical garden.

== Transport ==
Project of a new railway section connecting the cities of Chernivtsi and Kamianets-Podilskyi

The city has a bus station and a railway station Kamianets-Podilskyi. There is no large airport in the city, only an airport for small aircraft operates. The nearest airport with international flights is in Chernivtsi and abroad in Suceava. Intra-city and suburban passenger transport is carried out mainly by scheduled transport, and several taxi services operate, including electric vehicles.

Highway H03 passes through the city. The possibility of building a bypass road has been discussed for a long time, because the main flow of traffic moves through the city center, which causes inconvenience to residents.

In 2021, at the "Ukraine 30. Infrastructure" forum, the possibility of building a new section of the Kamianets-Podilskyi - Khotyn - Chernivtsi railway line was discussed. As of 2025, it is proposed to also build a parallel Euro-gauge line on this section Kamianets-Podilskyi - Chernivtsi.

== Culture ==
=== Main sights ===
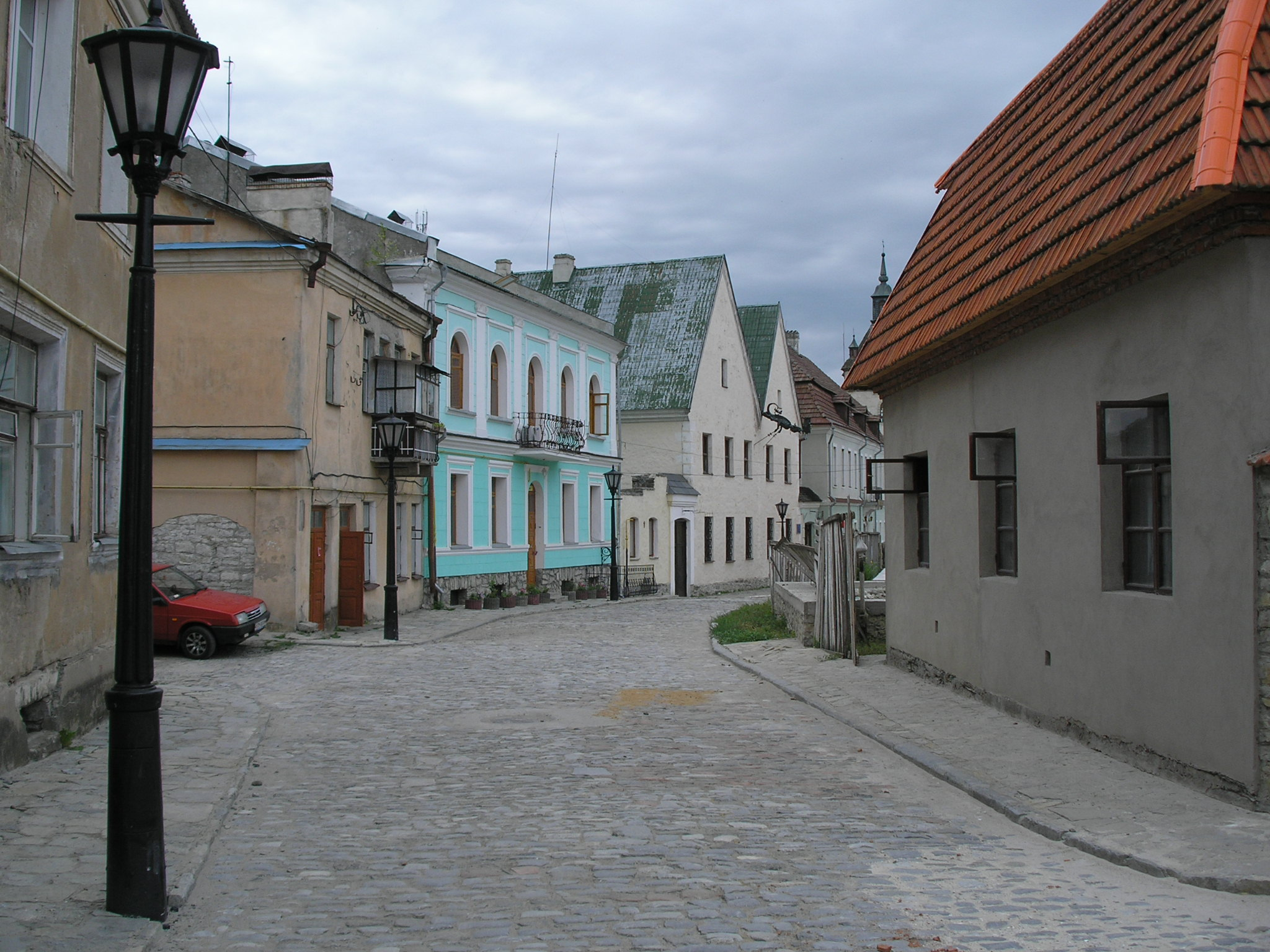
An old street in the city's old quarter

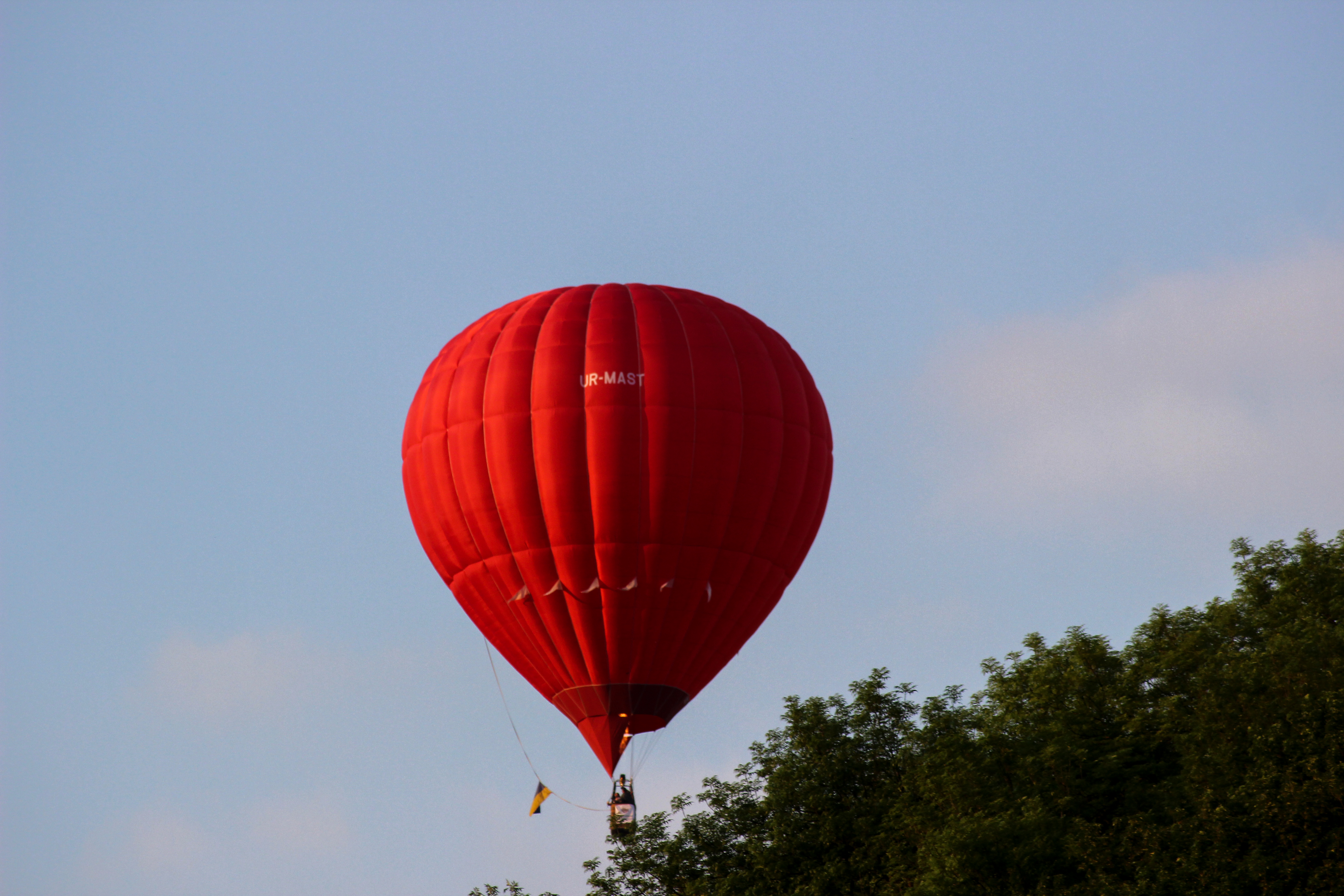
Hot air balloon over the city

The different peoples and cultures that have lived in the city have each brought their own culture and architecture. Examples include the Polish, Ruthenian and Armenian market squares. Famous tourist attractions include the ancient castle, and the numerous architectural attractions in the city's center, including the Cathedral of Saints Peter and Paul, Holy Trinity Church, the Polish City Hall, and the numerous fortifications. Other points of interest include the 14th-century "Ruthenian Gate", the 15th century Saint Nicholas Armenian Church, Orthodox Church of Saints Peter and Paul, Dominican Church, the so-called "Turkish Bridge" (14th century) and several residential buildings in Renaissance and Baroque styles.

Ballooning activities in the canyon of the Smotrych River have also brought tourists. In May and October, the city hosts Ballooning festivals. In addition, everyone can book a balloon flight even not during the time of the festival.

Since the late 1990s, the city has grown into one of the chief tourist centers of western Ukraine. Annual Cossack Games (Kozatski zabavy) and festivals, which include the open ballooning championship of Ukraine, car racing and various music, art and drama activities, attract an estimated 140,000 tourists and stimulate the local economy. More than a dozen privately owned hotels have recently opened, a large number for a provincial Ukrainian city.

"Respublica" Festival is a music and art festival for youth featuring modern music, literature, and street art. This festival is held annually, gathering hundreds of young art lovers, musicians, and art enthusiasts. Many of the city's buildings are decorated with murals, created during these festivals. The murals depict historical events, as well as modern concepts.

=== Gallery ===
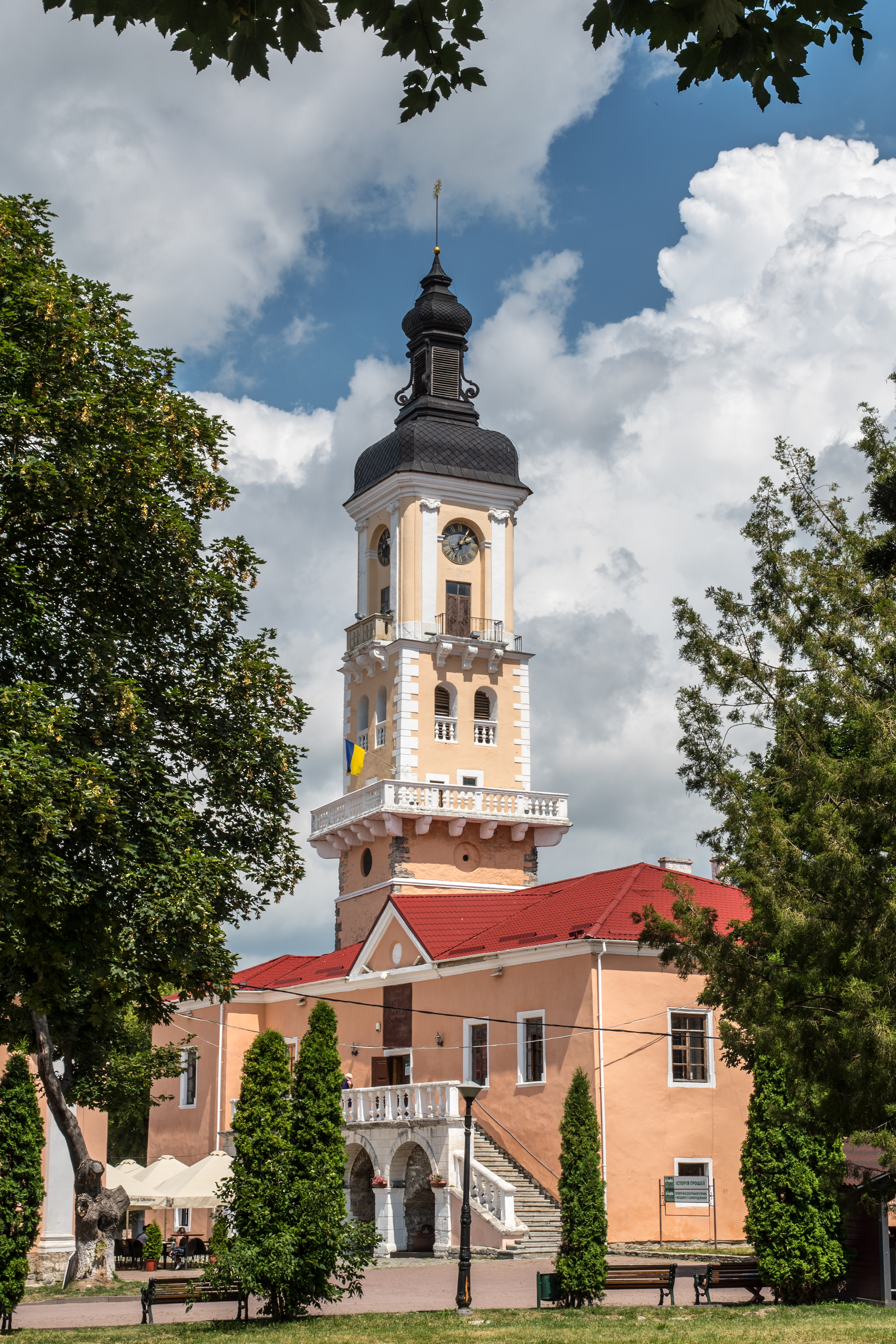
Old Polish City Hall

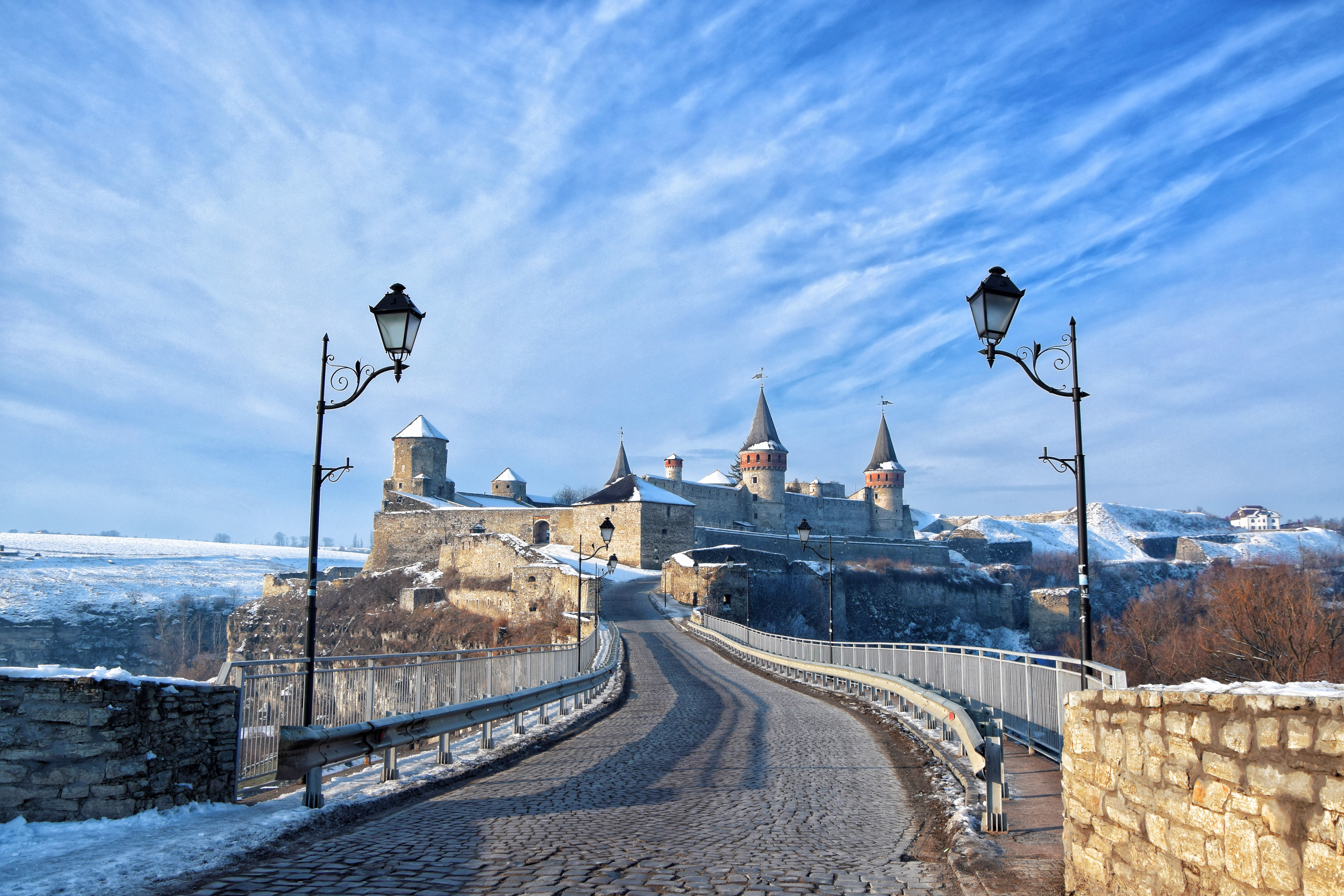
View on the fortress over the "Turkish Bridge"

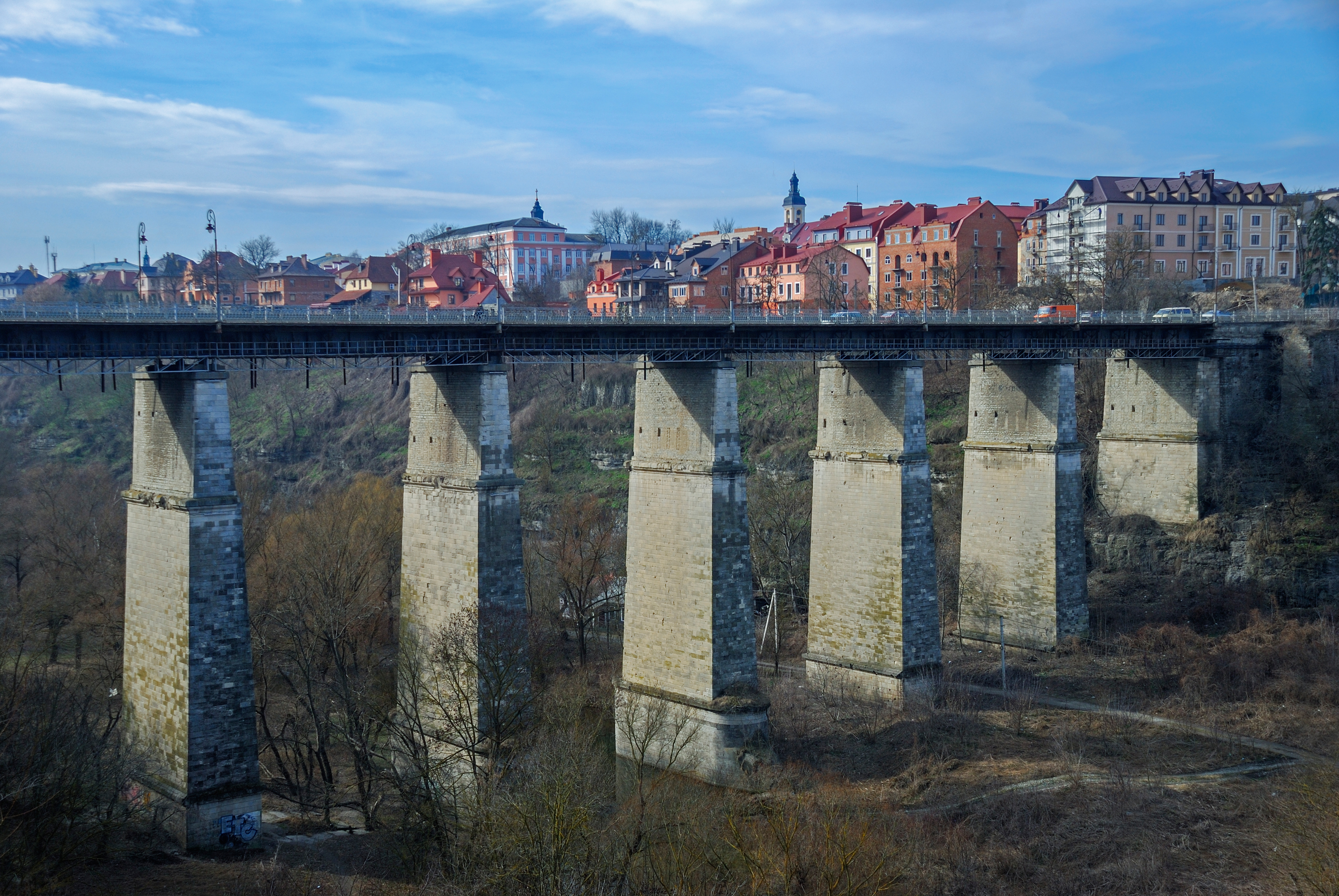
Novoplanivskyi ("New Plan") Bridge

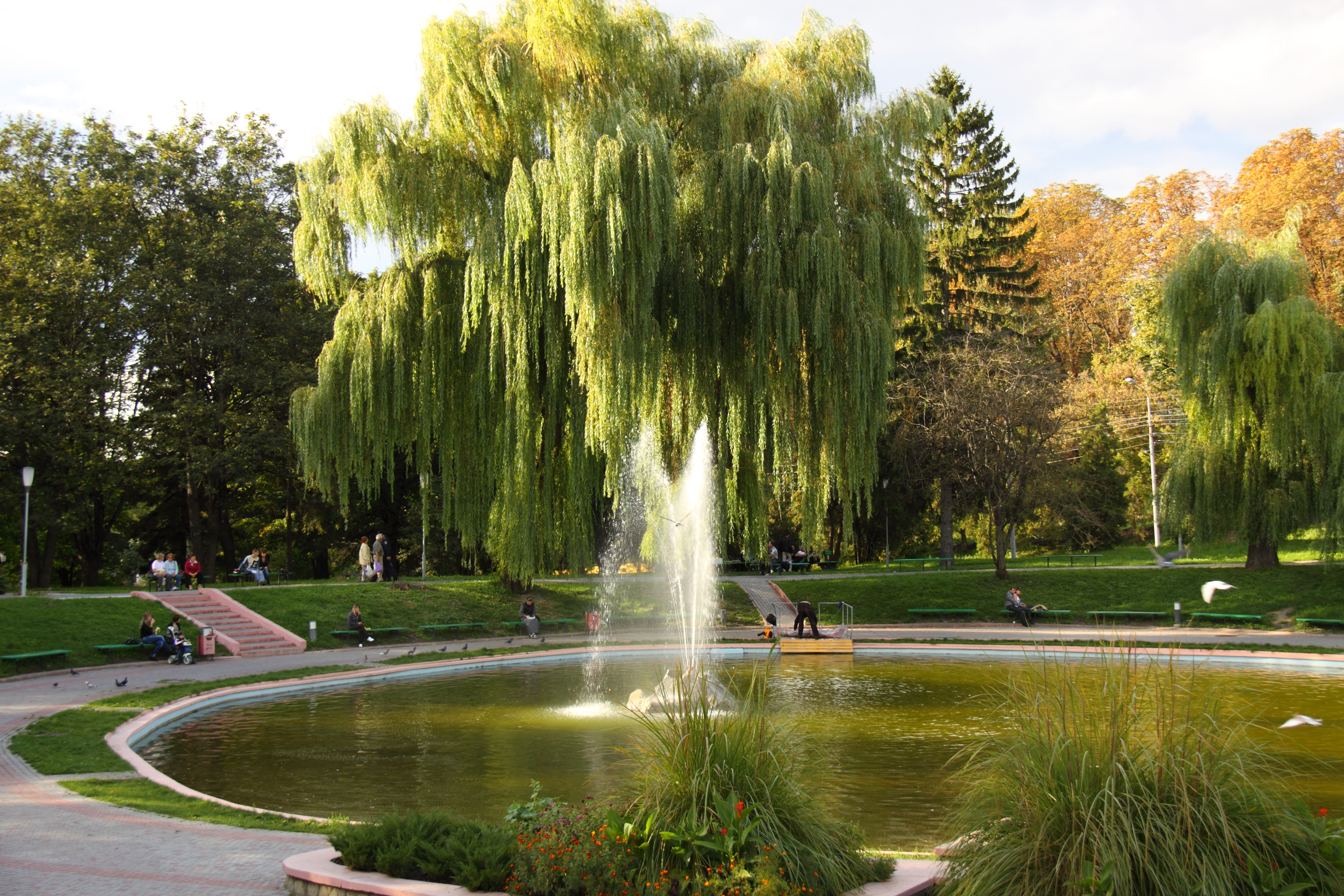
A park near the old quarter

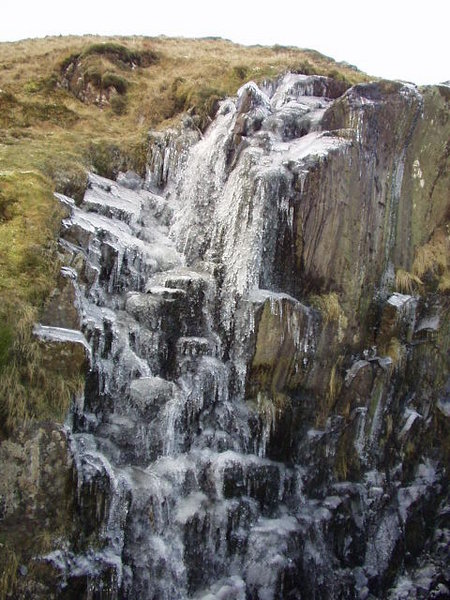
Frozen waterfall

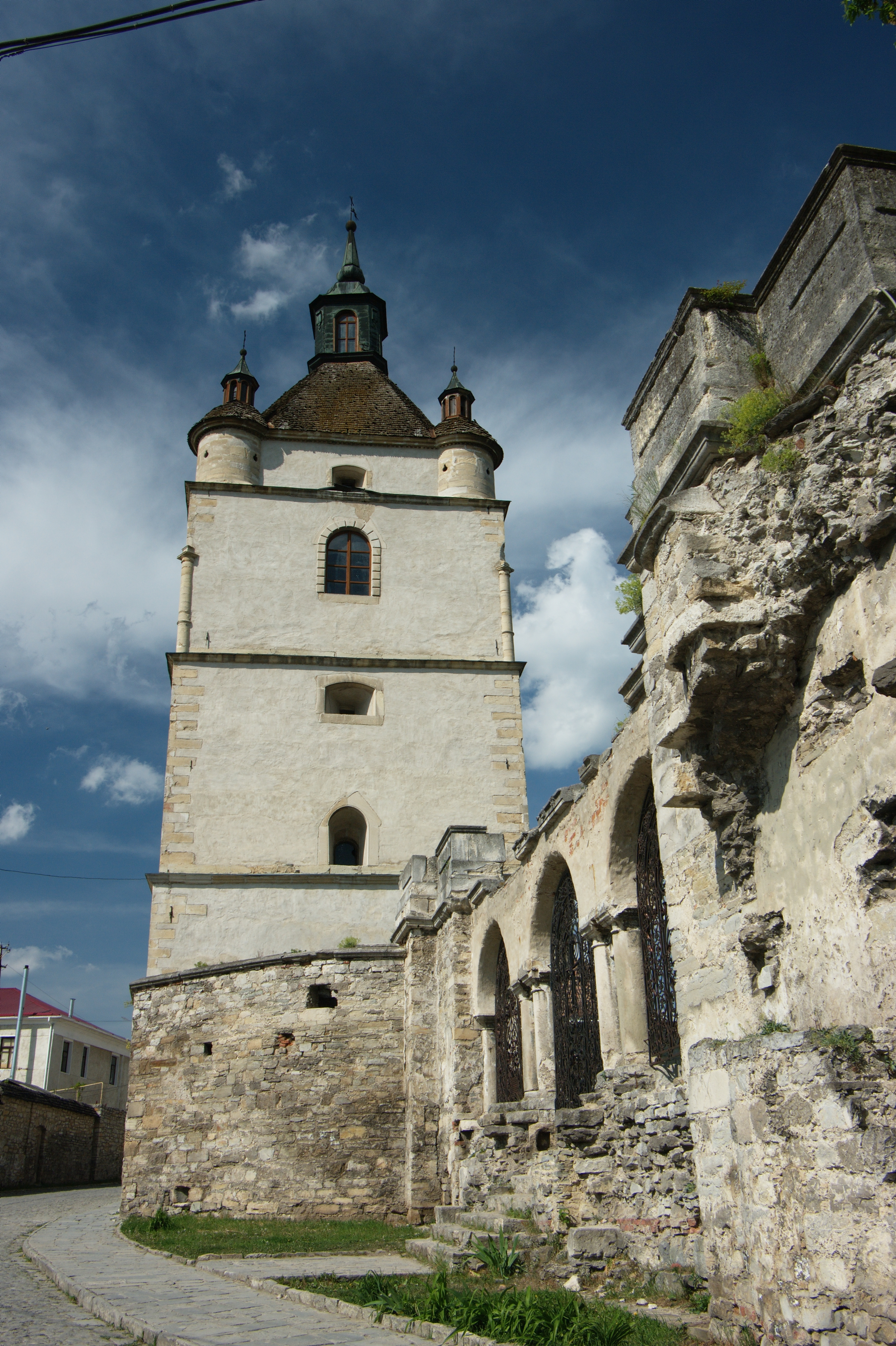
Armenian Bell Tower

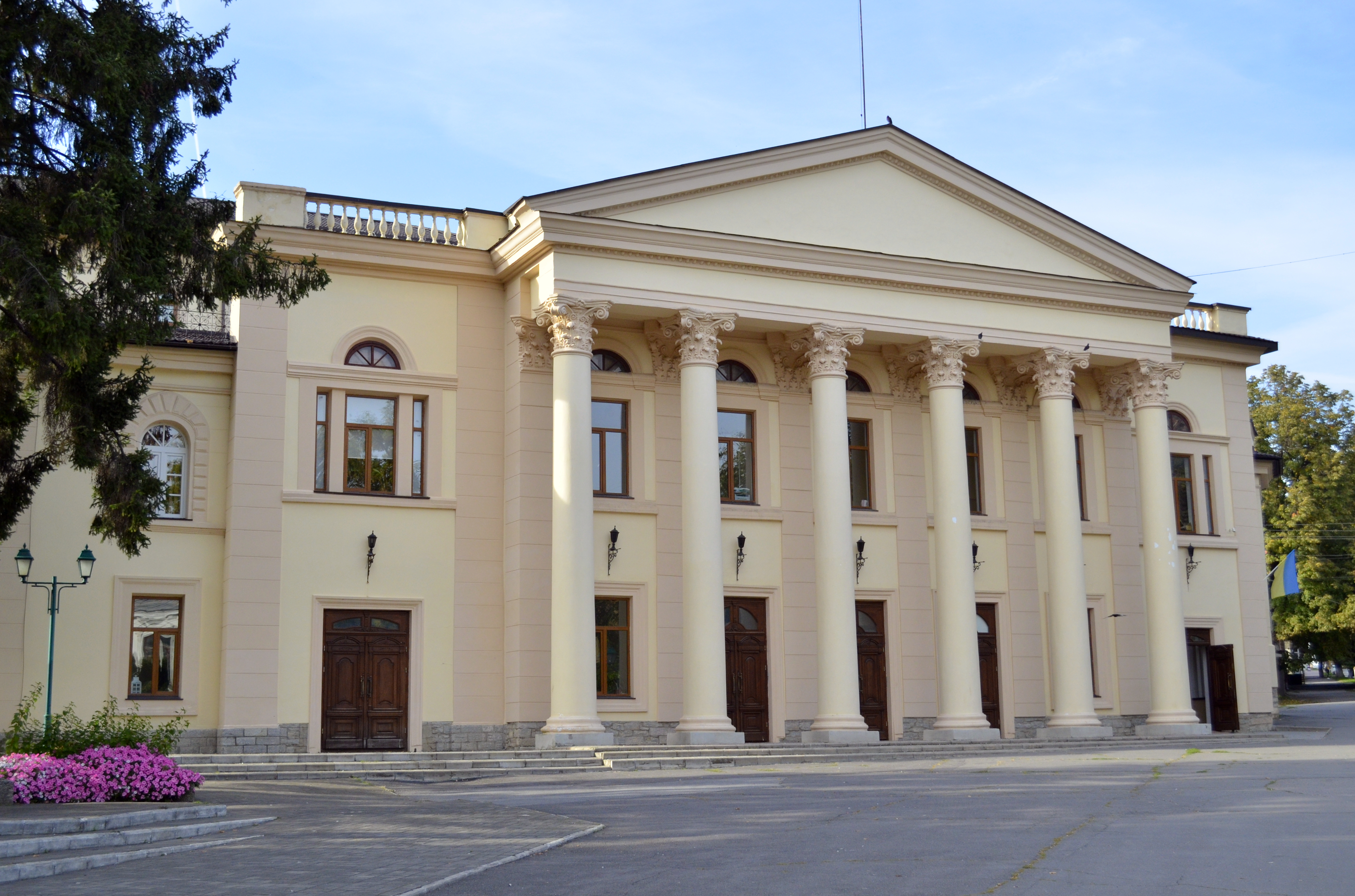
House of Culture

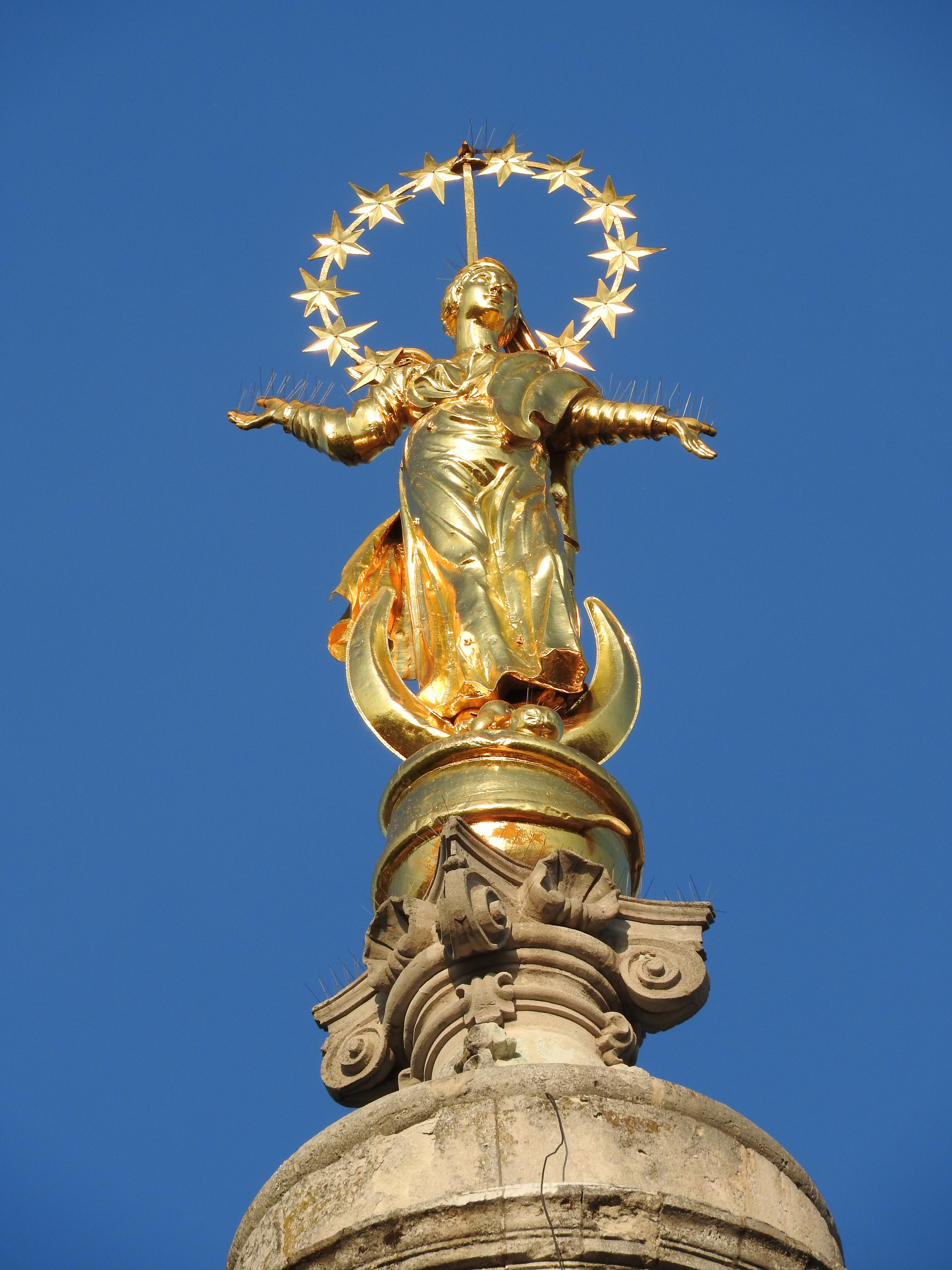
Sculpture of the Mother of God

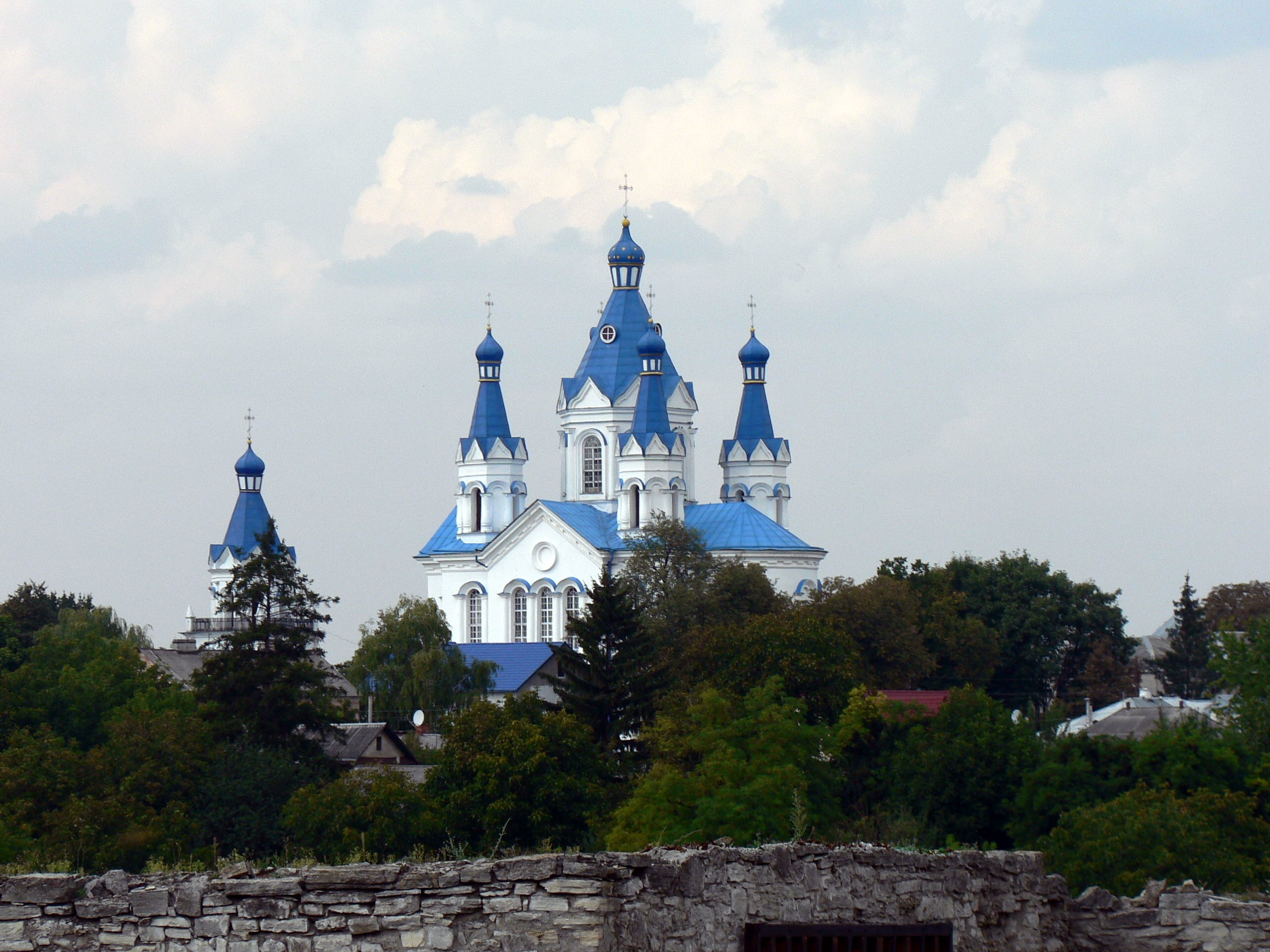
Orthodox church

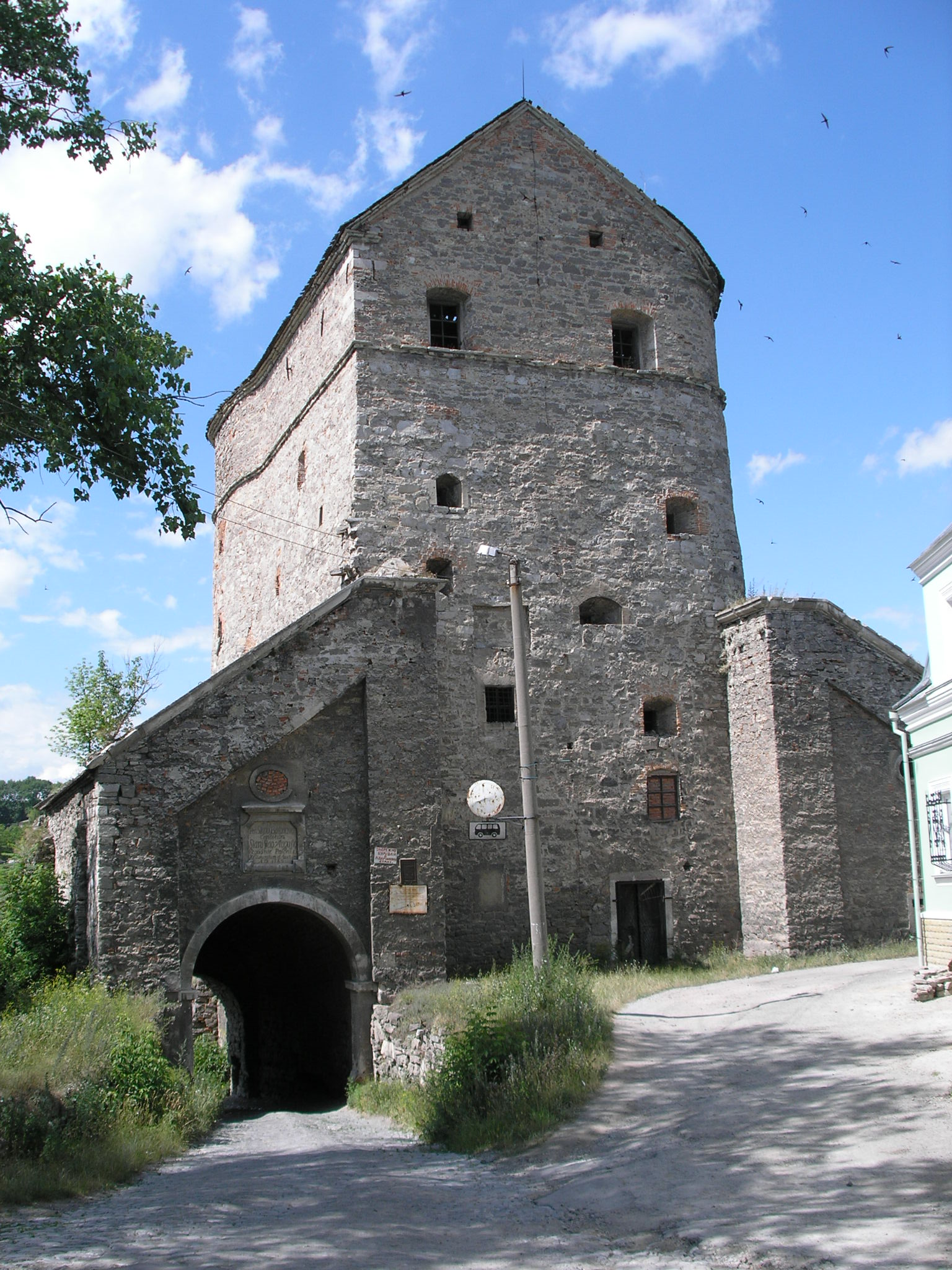
Stephen Báthory Tower

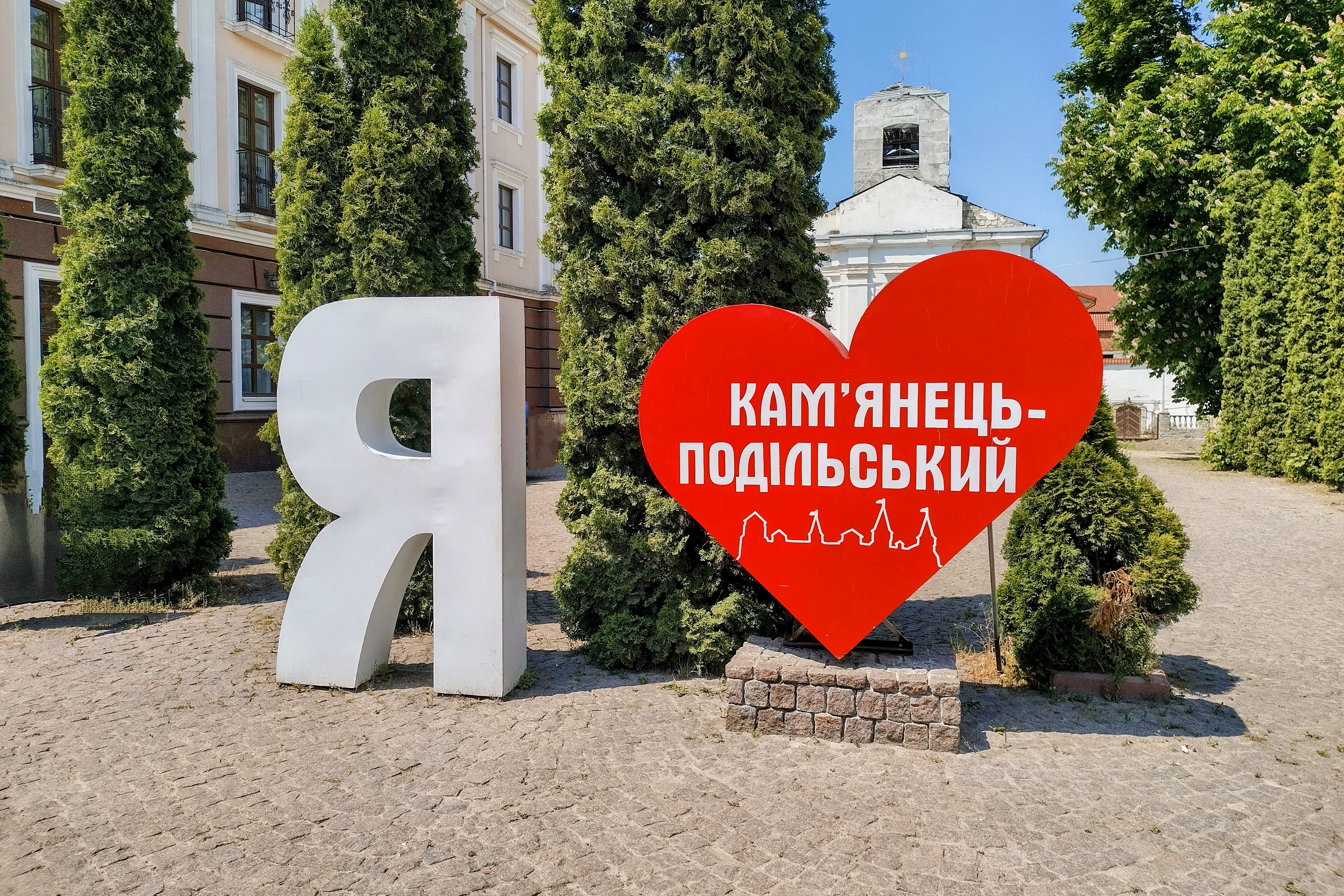
Art object "I love Kamianets-Podilskyi"

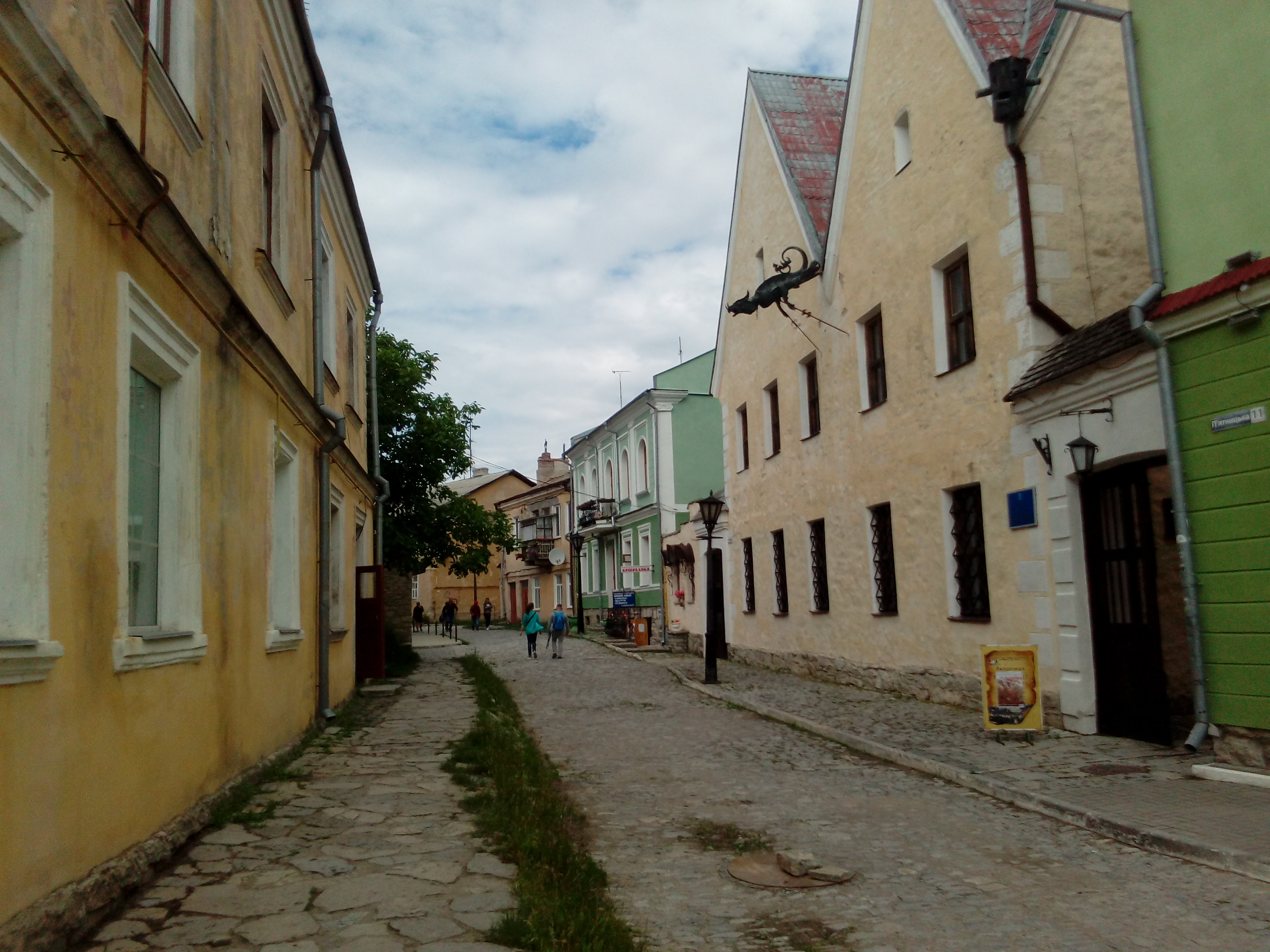
Piatnytska Street

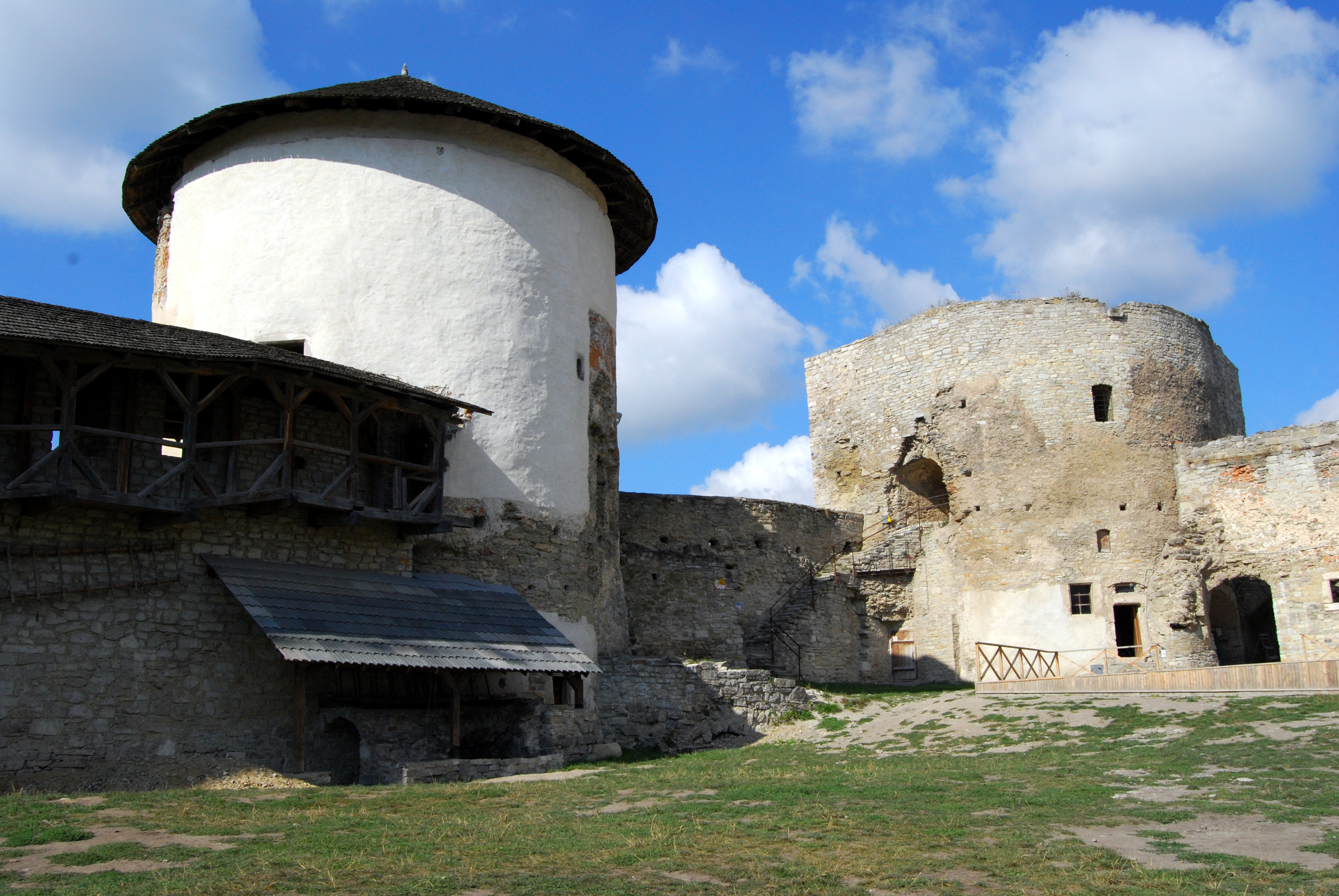
Fortress walls

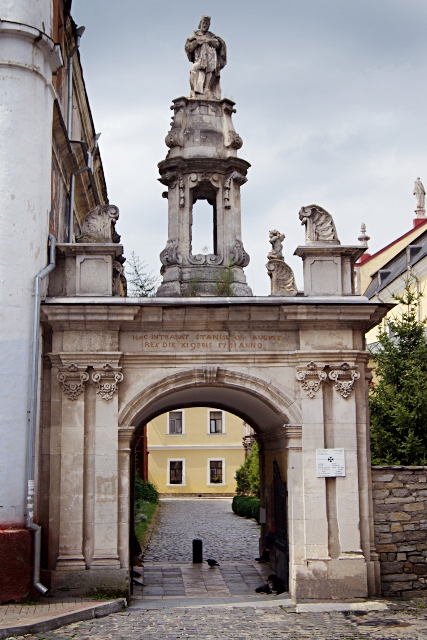
Triumphal Arch

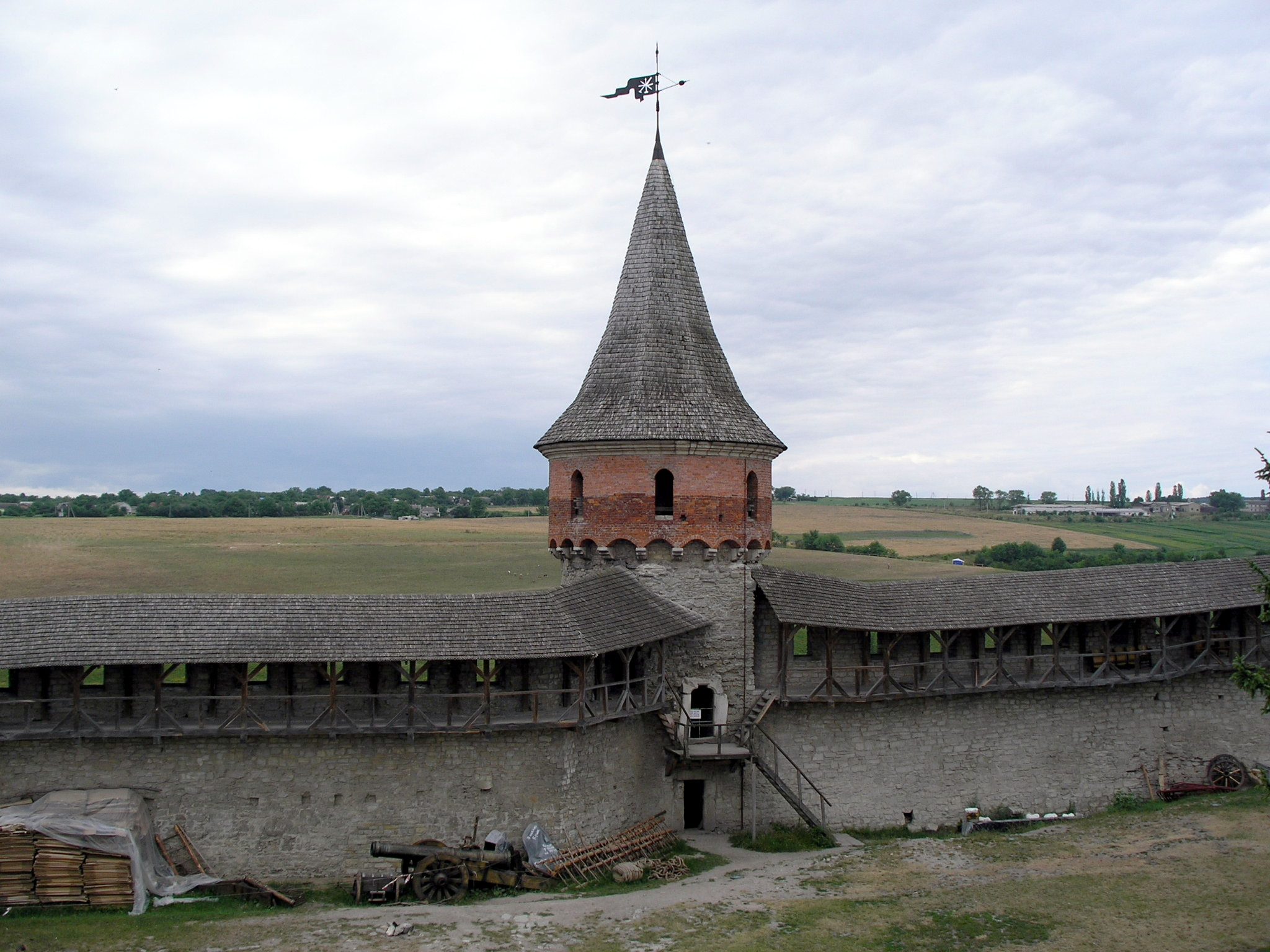
The impregnable fortress

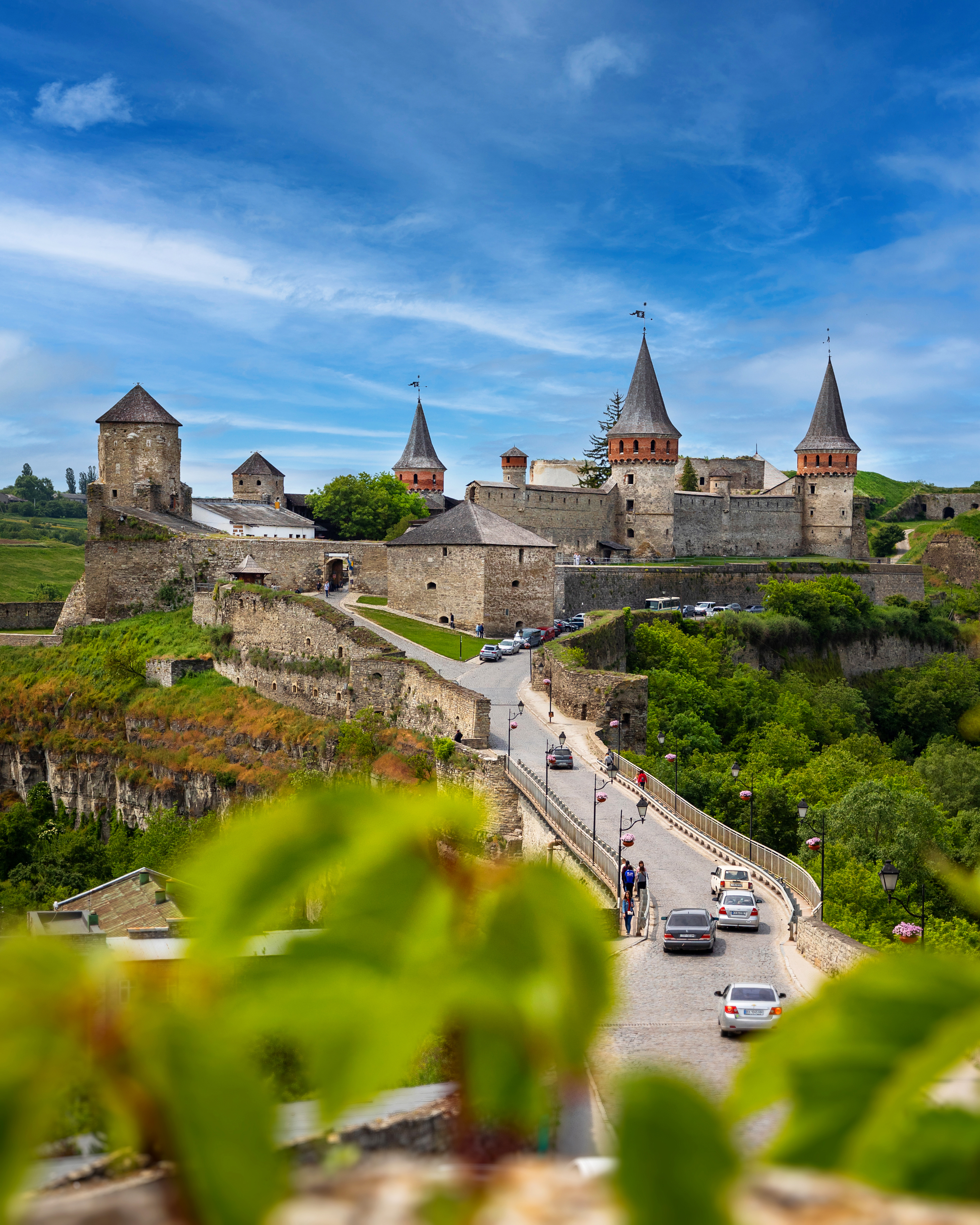
Fortress, 2023

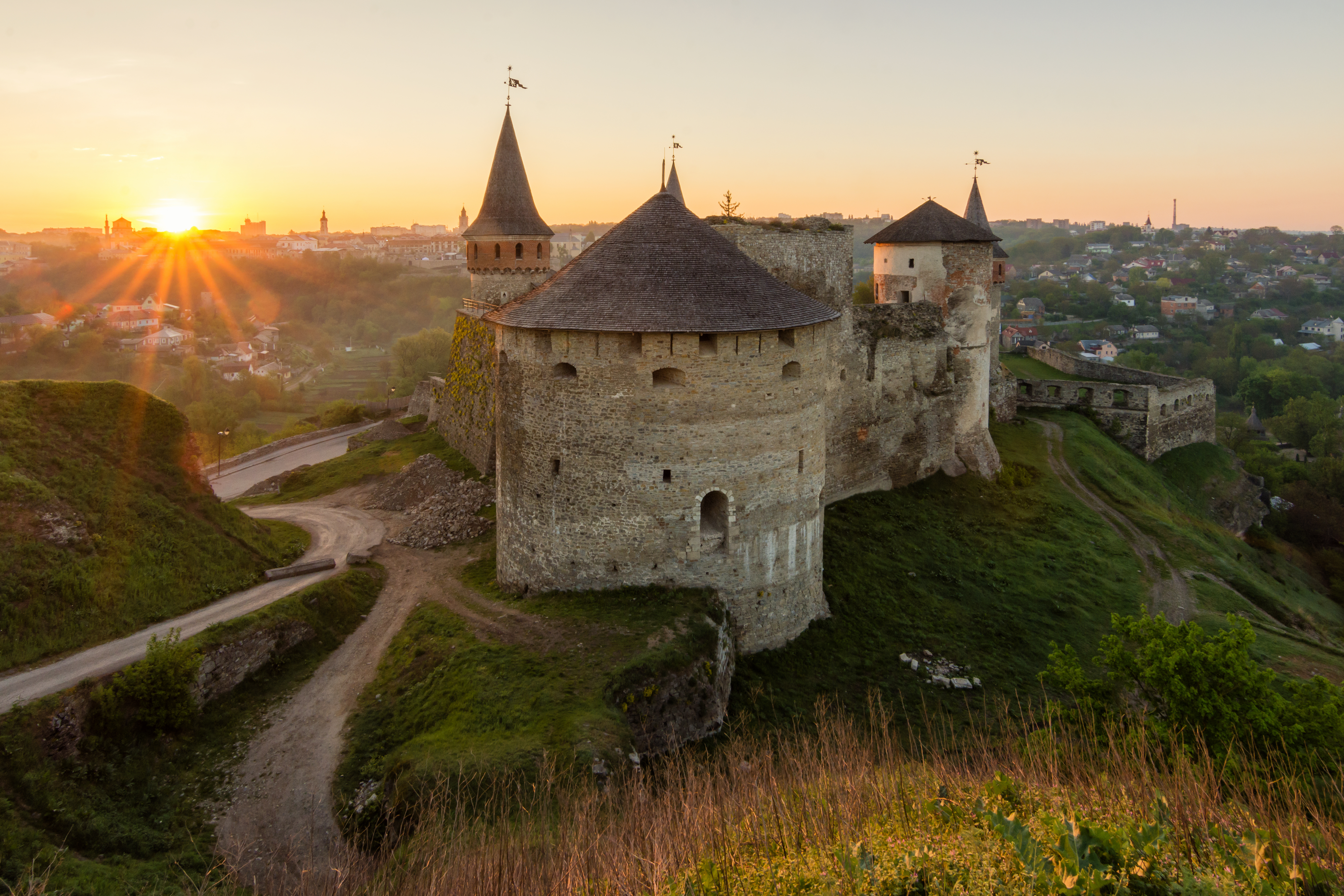
Fortress at dawn

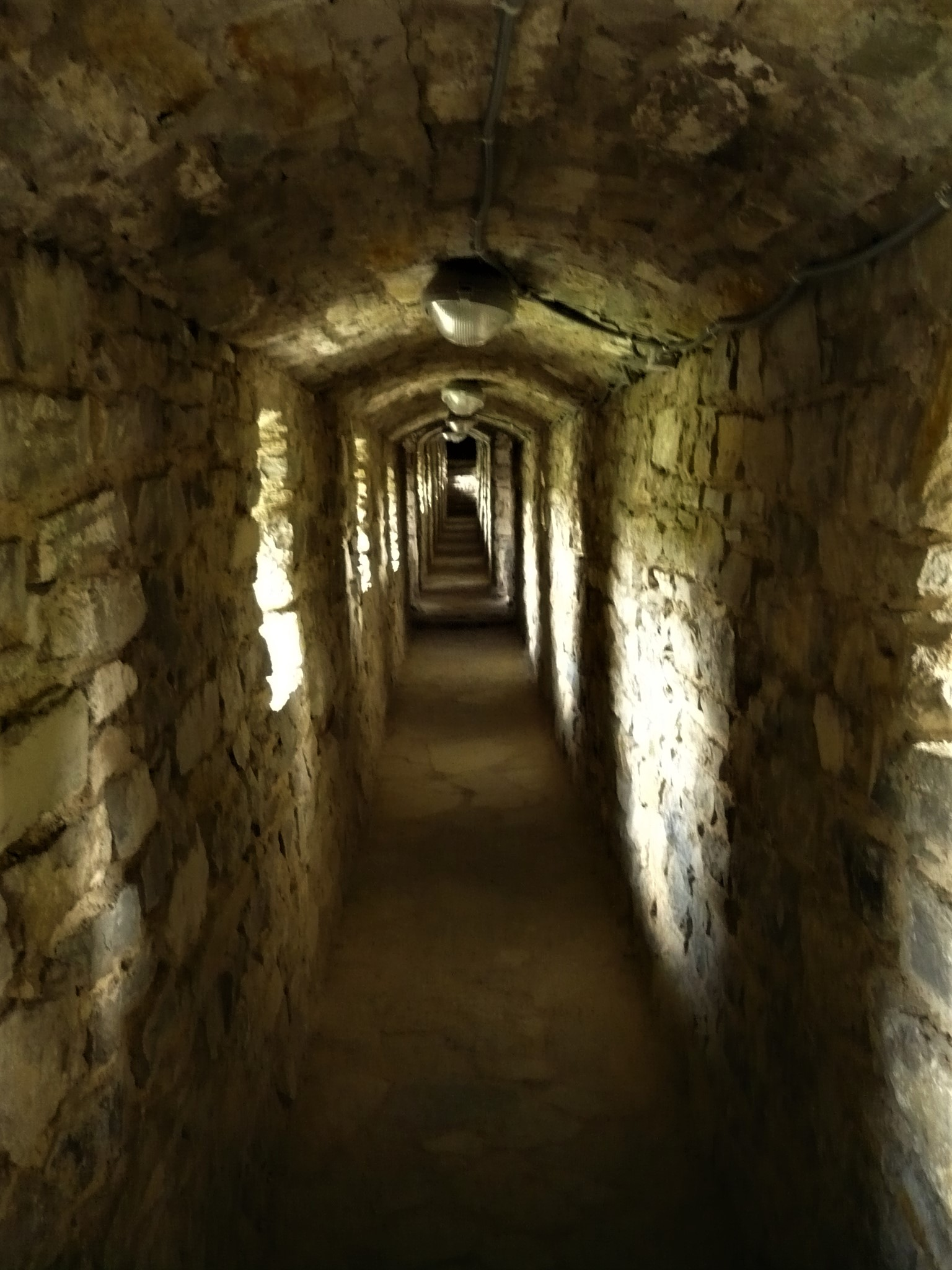
Fortress

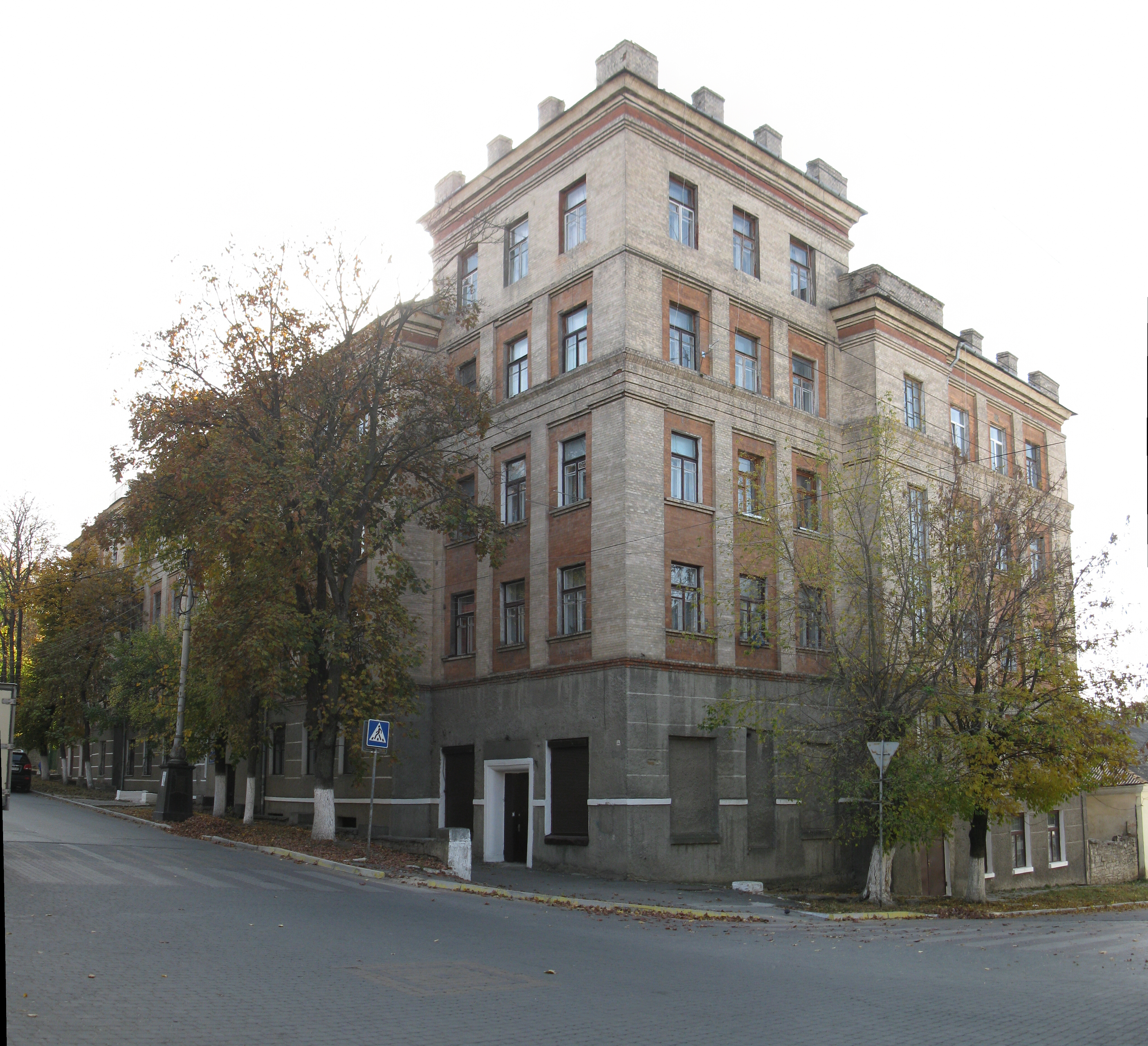
Residential building at Lesya Ukrainka Street

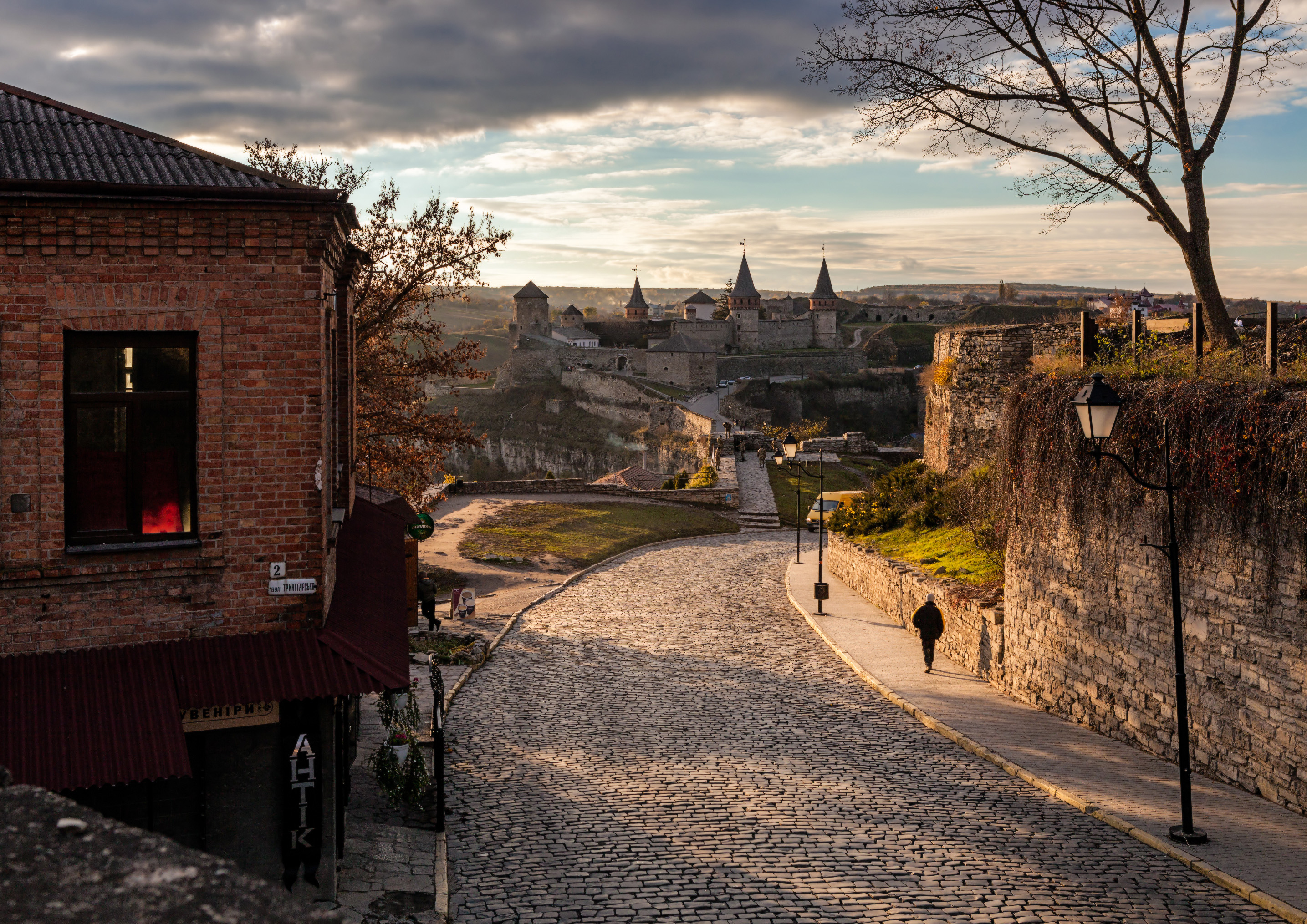
Old city

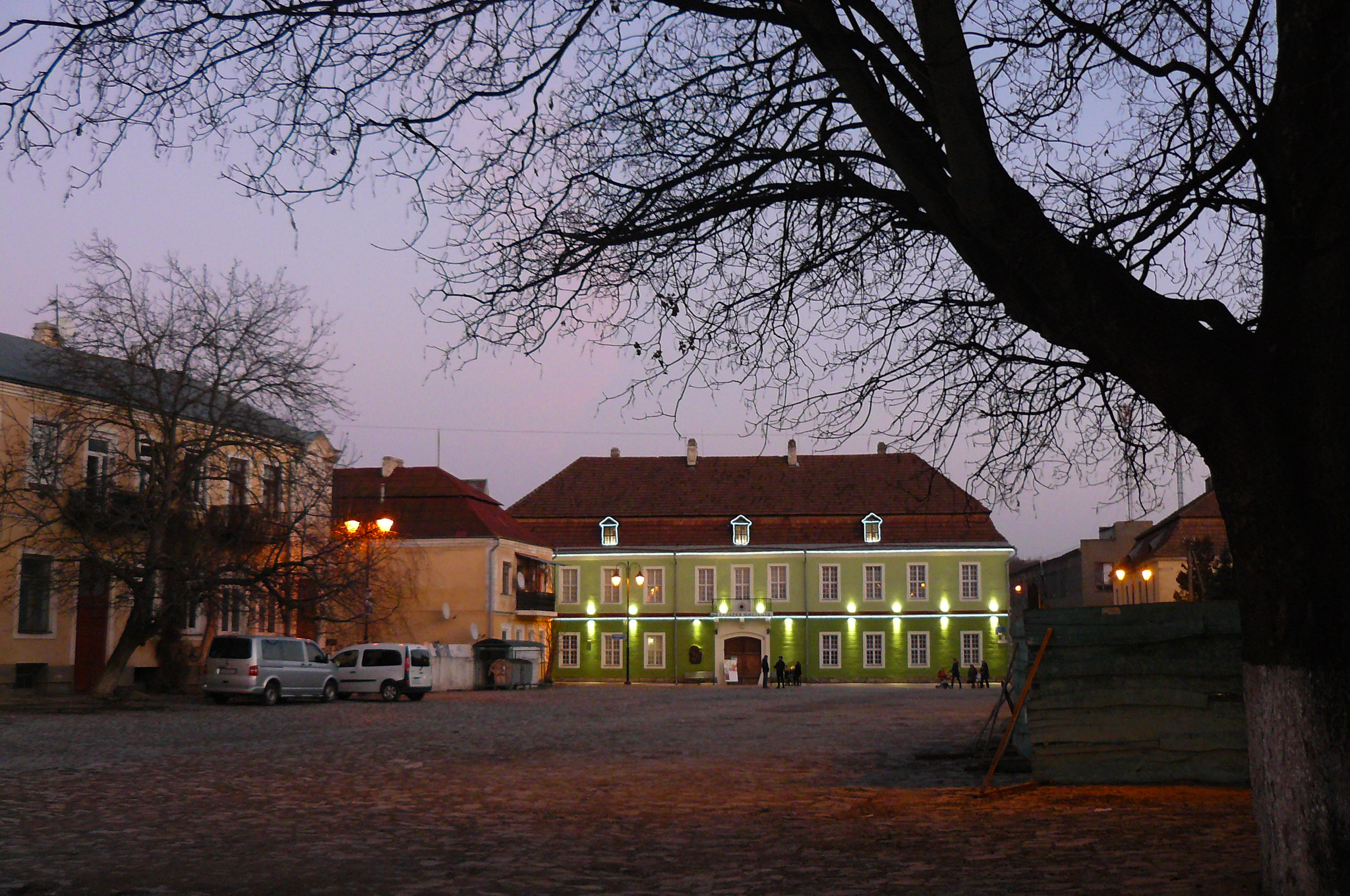
Art gallery

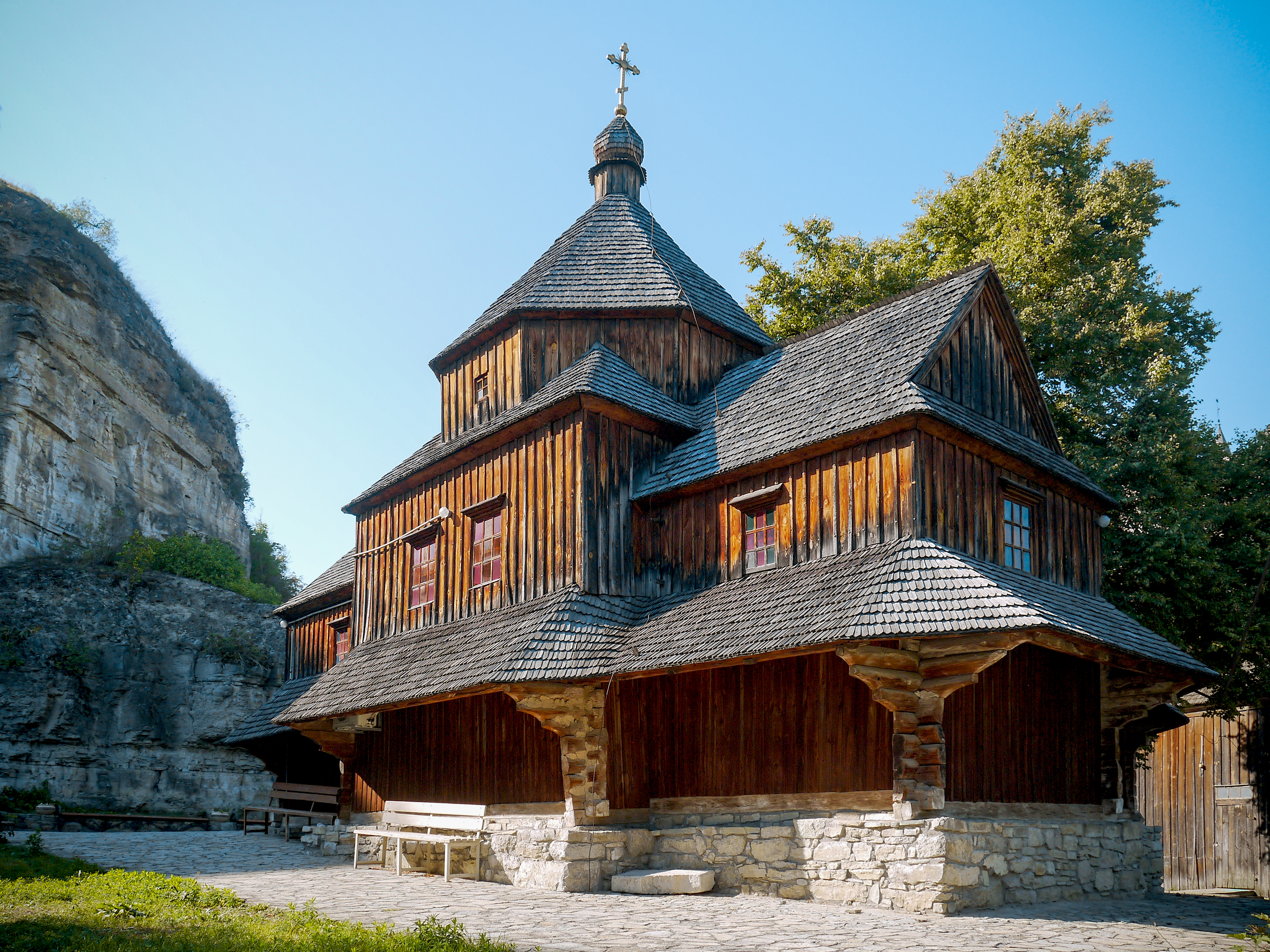
Сhurch

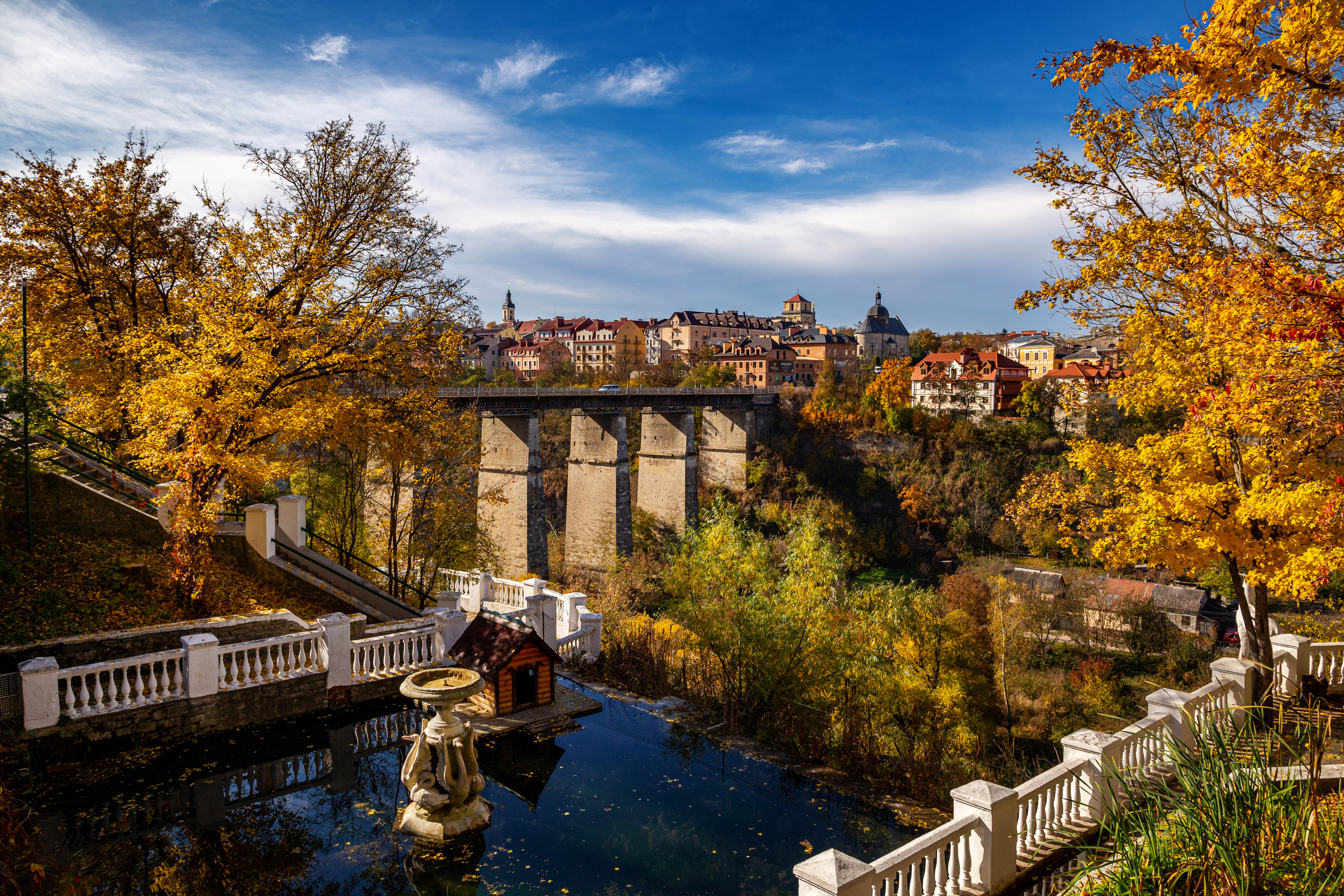
Novoplanivskyi Bridge and the Old City

A 2013 film about Kamianets-Podilskyi

== Twin towns – sister cities ==
Kamianets-Podilskyi is twinned with:

- Athens, United States
- Brantford, Canada
- Cihanbeyli, Turkey
- Dolný Kubín, Slovakia
- Edineț, Moldova
- Esslingen am Neckar, Germany
- Herrljunga, Sweden
- Līvāni, Latvia
- Ukmergė, Lithuania
- Głogów, Poland
- Głogów County, Poland
- Gorzyce, Poland
- Hautmont, France
- Hrubieszów, Poland
- Kalisz, Poland
- Kutná Hora, Czech Republic
- Valle de Mena, Spain
- Teruel, Spain
- Lublin, Poland
- Mariestad, Sweden
- Ponte Lambro, Italy
- Przemyśl, Poland
- Radoviš, North Macedonia
- Sanok, Poland
- Sanok County, Poland
- Roman, Romania
- Siret, Romania
- Zalău, Romania
- Targówek (Warsaw), Poland
- Tarnowo Podgórne, Poland
- Częstochowa, Poland
- Włodawa, Poland
- Zawiercie, Poland
- Kolbuszowa, Poland
- Chełm, Poland

== Notable residents ==
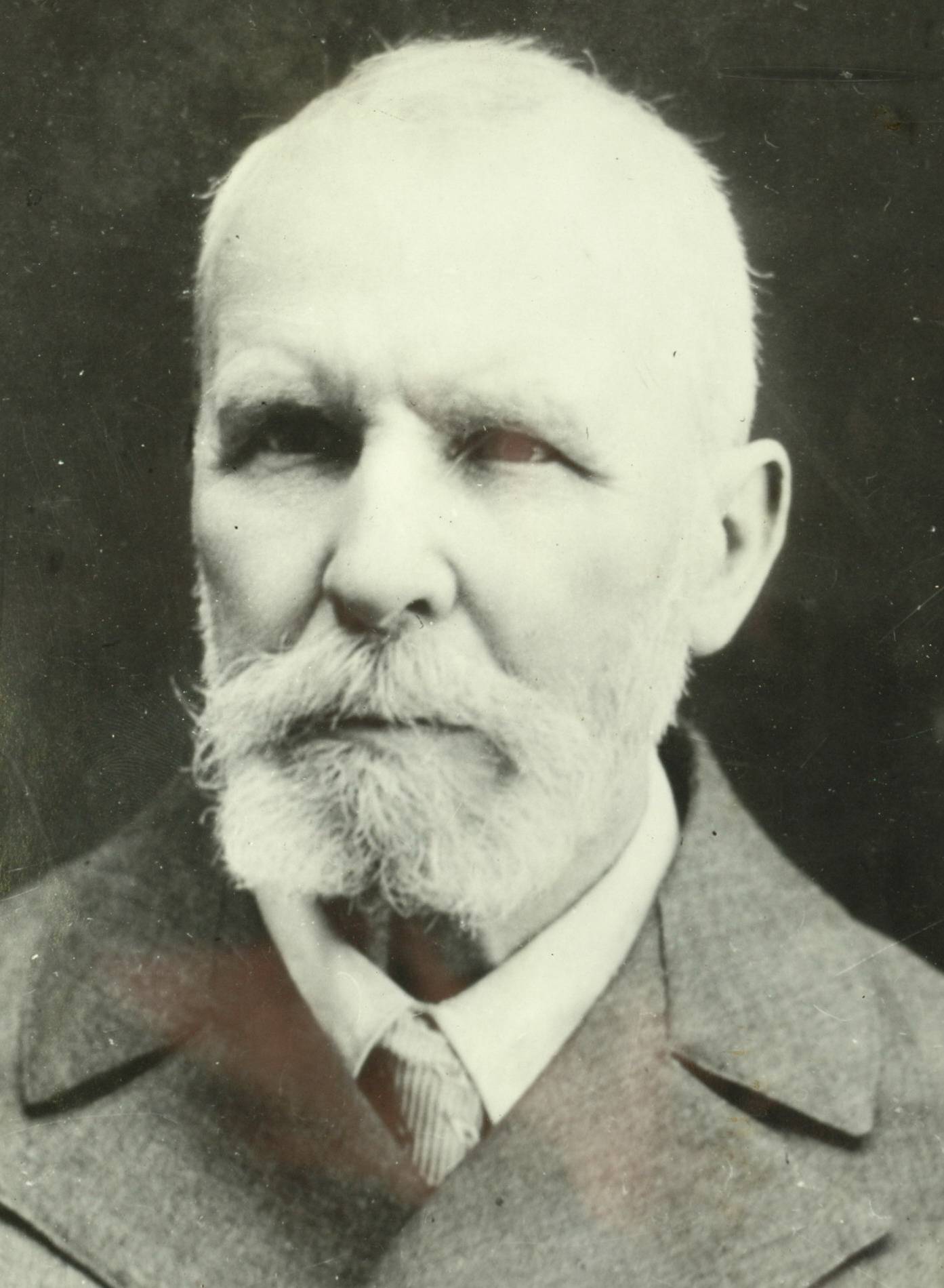
Yukhym Sitsinskyi

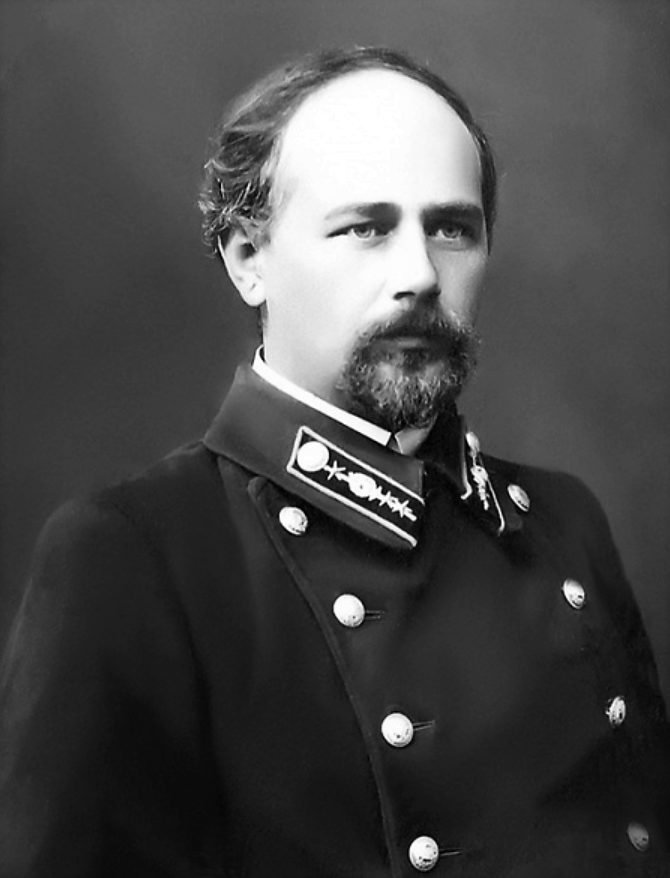
Mykola Leontovych

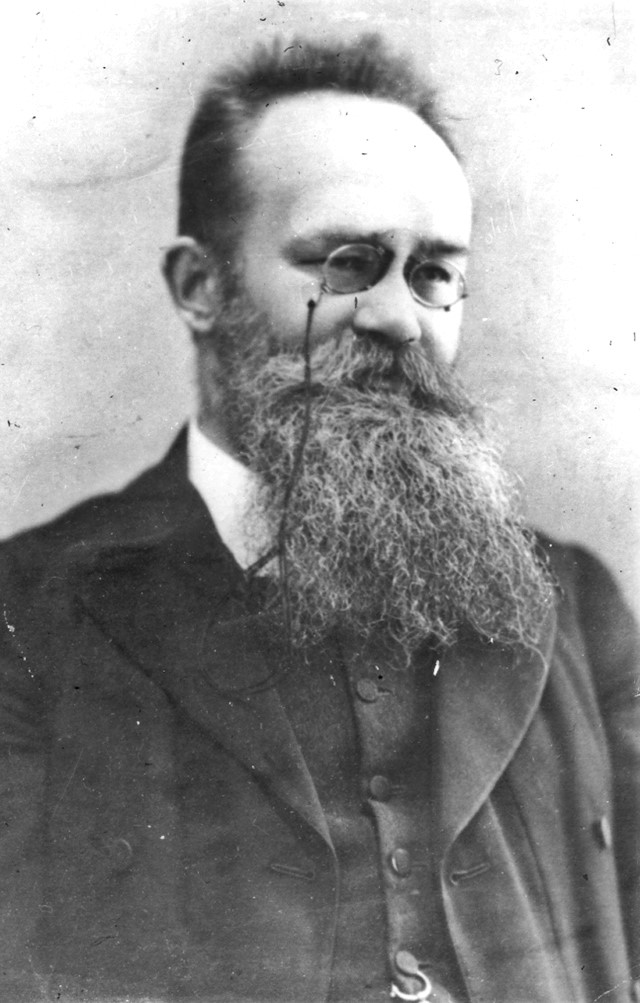
Mykhailo Hrushevsky

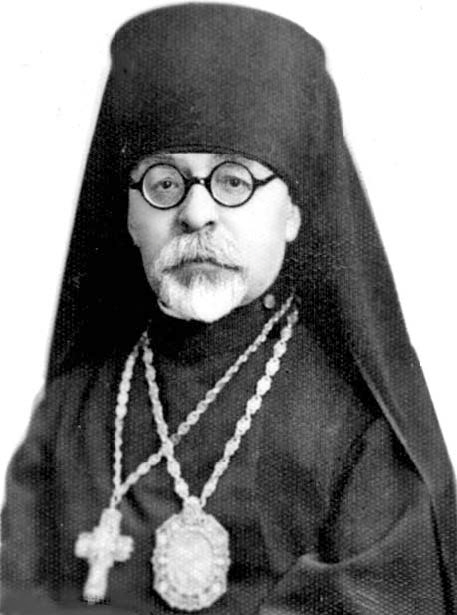
Ilarion Ohienko

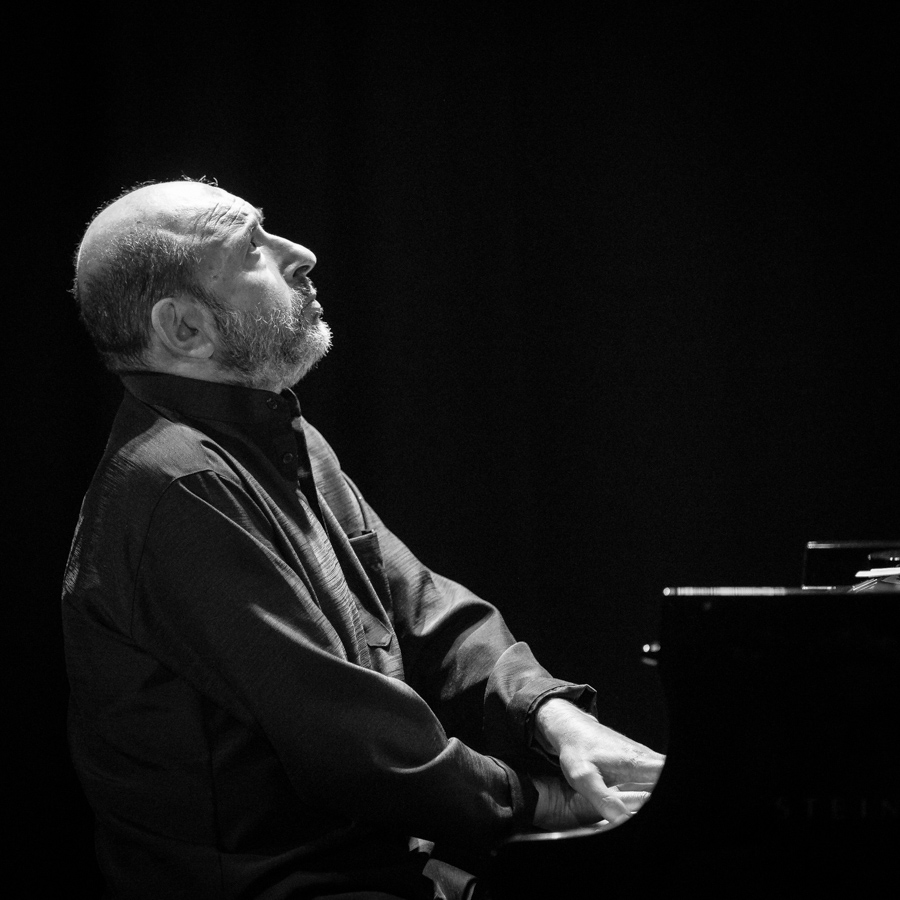
Mikhail Alperin

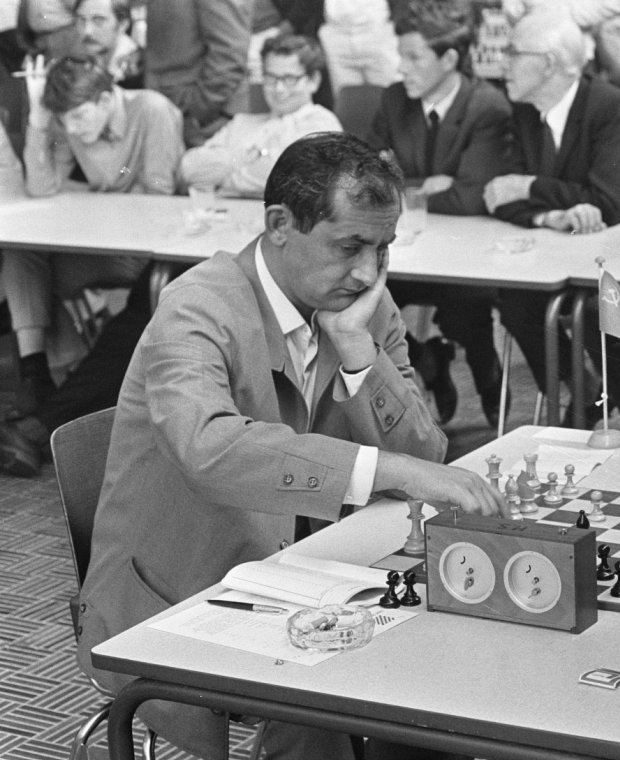
Leonid Stein

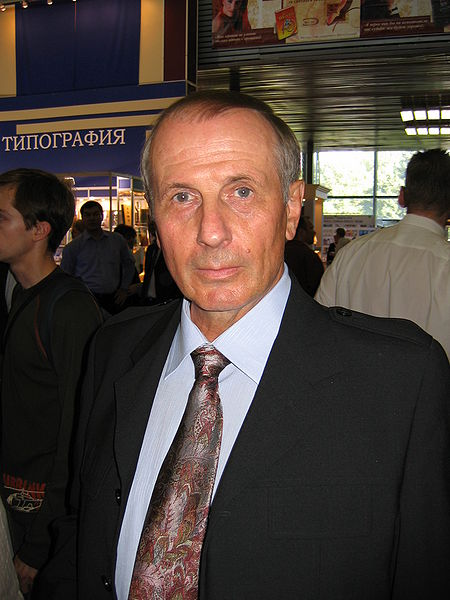
Mikhail Veller

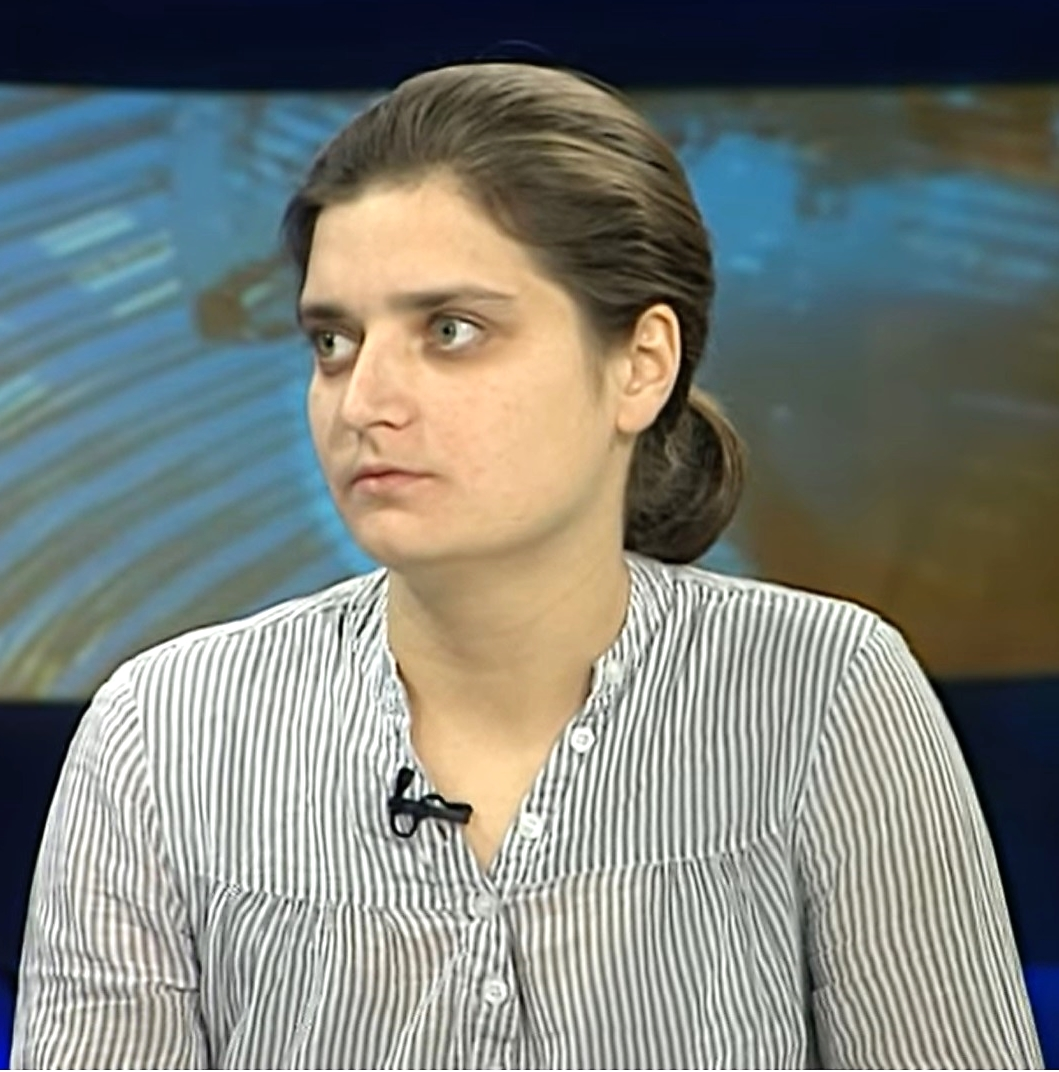
Maria Berlinska

- Mikhail Alperin (1956–2018), Ukrainian jazz pianist, of Jewish ethnicity.
- Maria Berlinska (born 1988), Ukrainian military volunteer and women's rights advocate, of Jewish ethnicity, born here.
- Andriy Bondar (born 1974), Ukrainian poet, translator and writer.
- Andrei Bondarenko (born 1987), Ukrainian operatic baritone, born here.
- Israel Brandmann (1901-1993), Ukrainian-Israeli composer, conducter and violinist.
- Mykhailo Drapatyi (born 1982), Ukrainian military officer, who is currently serving as the Commander-in-Chief of the Armed Forces of Ukraine
- Volodymyr Sichynskyi (1894–1962), Ukrainian emigre architect, graphic artist, and art historian, born here.
- Yukhym Sitsinskyi (1859–1937), Ukrainian historian, archaeologist, cultural and public figure of Podillia, Orthodox priest, lived and worked here.
- Ihor Marchuk (born 1969), Ukrainian entrepreneur and politician, born here.
- Serhiy Hamaliy (born 1979), Ukrainian statesman and entrepreneur and former Governor of Khmelnytskyi Oblast.
- Victor Deysun (born 1962), Ukrainian abstract expressionist painter.
- Mykola Bazhan (1904–1983), Ukrainian writer, poet, highly decorated political and public figure.
- Nikolai Chebotaryov (1894–1947), Russian and Soviet mathematician, best known for the Chebotaryov density theorem.
- Ustym Karmaliuk (1787–1835), Ukrainian outlaw who fought against the Russian administration and became a folk hero to the commoners of Ukraine. Karmaliuk was conscripted to serve in the Imperial Russian Army in Kamianets-Podilskyi. He was forcibly inducted into the Russian Imperial Army, and served in the Napoleonic Wars of 1812 in an Uhlan regiment, but eventually escaped and organized rebel bands who attacked merchants and landowners, while distributing the booty between the poor. He was captured in 1814, and was sentenced in Kamianets-Podilskyi to run a gauntlet of 500 blows, a typical military punishment.
- Moisey Gamarnik (born 1936), Soviet and Ukrainian physicist and inventor, born here.
- Tatiana Grigorovici (1877–1952), social democratic labour activist and economic theorist, born here
- Mykhailo Hrushevsky (1866–1934), Ukrainian academician, politician, historian and statesman, one of the most important figures of the Ukrainian national revival of the early 20th century, lived and worked in university here.
- Ilarion Ohienko (1882–1972), Ukrainian Orthodox cleric, linguist, church historian, and historian of Ukrainian culture. In 1919, he was Minister of Education in the Ukrainian People's Republic (UPR) and first rector of Kamianets-Podilskyi State Ukrainian University.
- Vladyslav Vanat (born 2002), Ukrainian professional footballer who plays as a striker for Dynamo Kyiv, born here.
- Vladyslav Khamelyuk (born 1998), Ukrainian professional footballer, born here.
- Vasyl Matviychuk (born 1982), Ukrainian long-distance runner.
- Borys Sulkovskyi (1881–?), Ukrainian colonel of the UNR Army, born here
- Vasyl Mazur-Lyakhovsky (1889–1949), Ukrainian military sergeant of the UNR Army, born here.
- Marko Mazurenko (1871–1929), Ukrainian corporal general of the Army of the Ukrainian People's Republic, born here.
- David Günzburg (Baron de Günzburg; 1857–1910) Russian orientalist and Jewish communal leader, born here.
- Israel J. Hochman (1872–1940), American klezmer violinist and recording artist, of Jewish ethnicity, born here.
- Sergius Ingerman (1868–1943), American physician and socialist, born here.
- Józef Kallenbach (1861–1929), Polish historian of literature, born here .
- Yuriy Khimich (1928–2003), Ukrainian painter, born here.
- Yelyzaveta Hilyazetdinova (born 1994), Ukrainian handball player, born here.
- Andrii Klantsa (born 1980), Ukrainian cardiac surgeon, scientist, Merited Doctor of Ukraine, Doctor of Science in Public Administration.
- Stanisław Koniecpolski (1590 or 1594–1646), Polish military commander, fought here.
- Yevhen Petrushevych (1863–1940), Ukrainian lawyer, politician, and president of the West Ukrainian People's Republic, lived and worked here, when WUPR government settled in Kamianets-Podilskyi.
- Myron Tarnavsky (1869–1938), Ukrainian supreme commander of the Ukrainian Galician Army, the military of the West Ukrainian People's Republic, fought here
- Mark Kopytman (1929–2011), Soviet-Israeli composer, musicologist, and pedagogue, born here.
- Murray Korman (1902–1961), American publicity photographer.
- Leib Kvitko (1890–1952), Yiddish poet, author of children's poems, and member of the Jewish Anti-Fascist Committee.
- Mykola Leontovych (1877–1921), Ukrainian composer, studied and graduated from the city's Theological Seminary.
- Iryna Merleni (born 1982), Ukrainian female wrestler.
- Aleksander Michałowski (1851–1938), Polish pianist, born here.
- Mieczysław Mickiewicz (1879–before 1939), Ukrainian and Polish politician, born here.
- Vitaliy Mykhaylovskiy (born 1974), Ukrainian historian. Doctor of Historical Science, Professor.
- Szymon Okolski (1580–1653), Polish historian, lived here.
- Ferdynand Antoni Ossendowski (1876—1945), Polish writer, explorer, professor, anti-communist and political activist; lived here.
- Morris Schappes (1907–2004), American educator, writer, radical political activist, historian, and magazine editor.
- Zvee Scooler (1899–1985), Jewish actor and radio commentator, best known as the Rabbi in Fiddler on the Roof; born here.
- Mendele Mocher Sforim (1836–1917), Jewish author; lived here
- Moses Wilhelm Shapira (1830–1884), Jewish scholar, antiquarian (alleged forger); born here
- Leo Sirota (1885-1965), Jewish pianist .
- Samuel Spielberg, Steven Spielberg's paternal grandfather.
- Mihail Starenki (1879–?), Bessarabian politician born here.
- Leonid Stein (1934–1973), Soviet chess Grandmaster, born here.
- Paul Burman (1888–1932), Estonian painter and graphic artist of Baltic German descent, born here.
- Moshe Stekelis (1898–1967), Russian-Israeli archaeologist .
- Arthur Tracy (1899–1997), American singer, born here.
- Anton Vasyutinsky (1858–1935), painter, coin and medal designer, born here.
- Mikhail Veller (born 1948), Russian-Estonian writer, born here.
- Zinaida Viktorzhevska (1905–1985) Ukrainian and Soviet artist, painter and member of the Union of Soviet Artists of Ukraine; born in Kamianets-Podilskyi
- Ion Vinokur (1930–2006), Ukrainian archaeologist, historian, lived and worked here.
- Jan de Witte (1709–1785), Polish architect and commander of the local fortress.
- Jerzy Wołodyjowski, Polish colonel, prototype for one of Henryk Sienkiewicz's characters, Michał Wołodyjowski; killed here.
- Oleksandr Zaremba (born 1978), Ukrainian historian, military reenactor, festival organizer, and civic activist.
- Maurice Zbriger (1896–1981), Canadian violinist, composer, and conductor, born here.
- Isidor Zuckermann (1866–1946), Austrian businessman.
- Jan Olszanski (1919–2003), Ukrainian Latin Catholic prelate as the first diocesan Bishop of the reestablished Diocese of Kamianets-Podilskyi from 16 January 1991 until his retirement on 4 May 2002.
- Józef Zajączek (1751-1826), Polish general and politician, born here.
- Sergey Gorshkov (1910–1988), Russian and Soviet Admiral of the fleet of the Soviet Union, born here.

== Sources ==
- Olha Plamenytska, ed. (2003). Tourist guide Kamianets-Podilskyi (in Ukrainian). Lviv: Tsentr Yevropy. ISBN 966-7022-46-3. Archived from the original on 16 November 2007.
- Peskova, Anna; Mikhaylov, Kirill (2018). "The Large Fortified Settlement Near Shepetivka: History of the Medieval Settlement – History of the Archaeological Site". Analecta Archaeologica Ressoviensia. 13: 417–440. doi:10.15584/anarres.2018.13.20.
