= Ukrainian Orthodox Eparchy of Central Canada =

Winnipeg and Central Canada

Location
- Ecclesiastical province: Ukrainian Orthodox Church of Canada
- Metropolitan: Metropolitan Ilarion (Roman Rudnyk)

Statistics
- Churches: ≈60

Information
- Cathedral: Holy Trinity Ukrainian Orthodox Metropolitan Cathedral, in Winnipeg, Manitoba; Holy Trinity Ukrainian Orthodox Cathedral, in Saskatoon, Sasktachewan

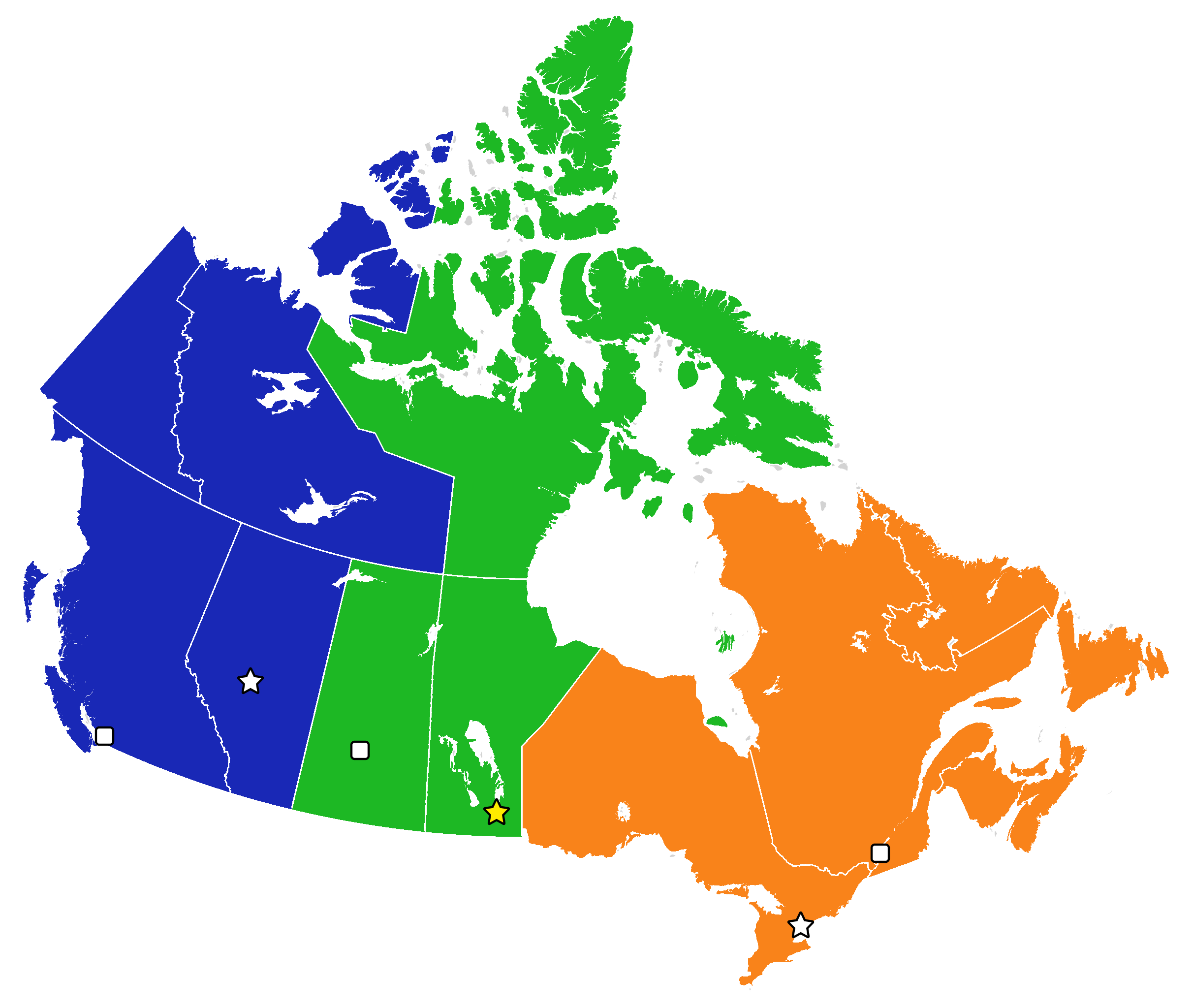
The Central eparchy is marked in green

The Ukrainian Orthodox Eparchy of Central Canada is an eparchy of the Ukrainian Orthodox Church of Canada, under the Ecumenical Patriarchate of Constantinople. The Central Eparchy is currently led by Metropolitan Ilarion (Rudnyk).

The Central Eparchy consists of the Canadian provinces of Saskatchewan and Manitoba, and has about 60 churches (most of them country churches), and two cathedral churches (Holy Trinity Ukrainian Orthodox Metropolitan Cathedral in Winnipeg, Manitoba, and Holy Trinity Ukrainian Orthodox Cathedral, in Saskatoon, Saskatchewan.)

== History ==
The early history of the Eparchy largely parallels that of the UOCC, which was founded on the territory of the diocese in Saskatoon, Saskatchewan. Since the reorganization of the Ukrainian Greek Orthodox Church of Canada (what later became the UOCC) as a metropolia in 1951 the Central Eparchy has served as the diocese of the 'first hierarch' or primate of the UOCC. Auxiliary or assistant bishops to the Metropolitan of the UOCC are consecrated with the title "of Saskatoon" to honor the city's role in the founding of the Church.

== List of Bishops of Winnipeg ==
- Archbishop Mstyslav (Skrypnyk) - (1947-1950)
- Metropolitan Ilarion (Ohienko) - (1951-1972)
- Metropolitan Michael (Khoroshy) - (1972-1975)
- Metropolitan Andrew (Metiuk) - (1975-1985)
- Metropolitan Wasyly (Fedak) - (1985-2005)
- Metropolitan John (Stinka) - (2005-2010)
- Metropolitan Yurij (Kalistchuk) - (2010–2021)
- Metropolitan Ilarion (Rudnyk) - (2022–Present)

== List of Bishops of Saskatoon ==
- Archbishop Boris (Yakovkevych) - Bishop of Saskatoon (1963-1975)
- Archbishop Mykolaj (Debryn) - Bishop of Saskatoon (1975-1978)
- Metropolitan Wasyly (Fedak) - Bishop of Saskatoon (1978-1981)
- Metropolitan John (Stinka) - Bishop of Saskatoon (1983-1985)
- Metropolitan Yurij (Kalistchuk) - Bishop of Saskatoon (1989–1995)
- Bishop Andriy (Peshko) - Bishop of Saskatoon (2008–2010)
