= Christophoros Rakintzakis =

Greek Orthodox prelate (1931–2020)

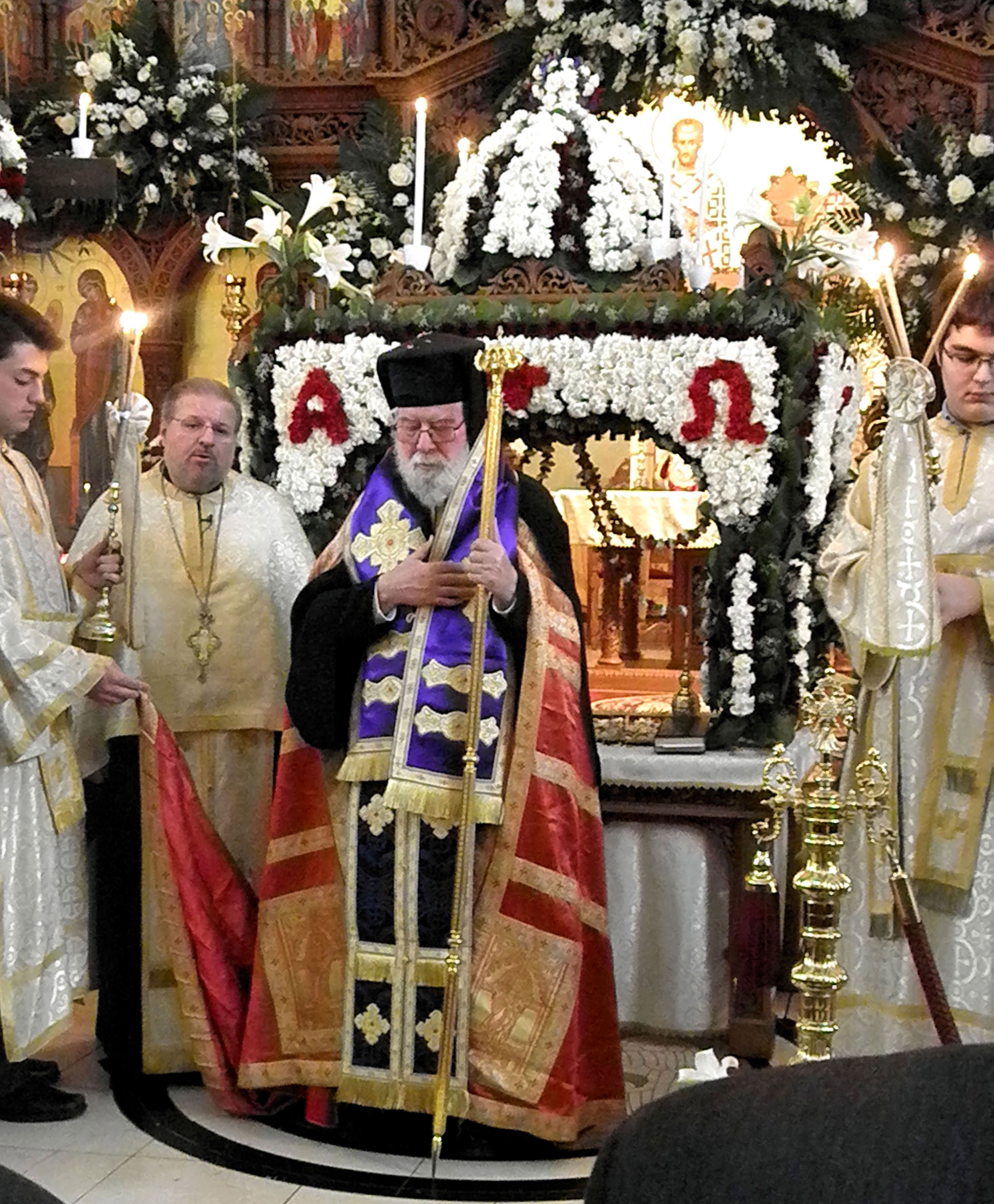
Bishop Christophoros (Rakintzakis) of Andida.

Bishop Christophoros (Rakintzakis) (Greek: Θεοφιλέστατος Επίσκοπος Ανδίδων κ.κ. Χριστοφόρος), born George Rakintzakis (May 1, 1931, Athens, Greece – February 14, 2020, Greece), H.B.A., B.Div., B.Ed., M.A., was the first Vicar-Bishop of the Greek Orthodox Metropolis of Toronto (Canada) under the Ecumenical Patriarchate of Constantinople (1999–2017), and the titular Bishop of Andida (1999–2020). (Note: Andida, now Zivint or Bozova, near the Korkuteli district, of Antalya Province, in Turkey, was a suffragan see of Perge in the province of Pamphylia Secunda in Asia Minor, within the Patriarchate of Constantinople.) He also served as the first Dean of the Toronto Orthodox Theological Academy from October 1997 through to June 2006. In addition, he was a brother of the historic Hosios Loukas monastery in Boeotia, Greece. He officially retired in 2017 and resided in Greece for the remainder of his life.

== Life ==
Christophoros of Andida was born George Rakintzakis on 1 May 1931, in Athens, Greece.

=== Education and training ===
He studied at the Theological School of the University of Athens from 1948 to 1953.

After attending the Teaching School of Secondary Education from 1966 to 1968, (Note: (in Greek) "Διδασκαλεῖον Μέσης Ἐκπαιδεύσεως.") he pursued further studies at the School of Philosophy of the University of Athens, from 1968 to 1971.

Being a recipient of the Greek State Scholarship award, he completed his post-graduate studies in Great Britain. First he specialized in pedagogy at the UCL Institute of Education in London from 1971 to 1972. Later he earned his Master of Arts in Byzantine History at the University of Birmingham from 1973 to 1975. (Note: WORK COMPLETED, BIRMINGHAM (1975): M.A. – Rakintzakis, G. "Orthodox-Muslim relations in the 14th century.")

In Greece he had also previously completed his military service over a two-year term as a reserve artillery officer in the Hellenic Army.

=== Teaching ===
He served as a High School and Lyceum headmaster from 1959 to 1990. From 1975 he was Professor at the Athonite Ecclesiastical Academy on Mount Athos, teaching there periodically over the next eight years. (Note: The Athonite School was officially re-established on Mount Athos in 1953, re-named the Athonite Ecclesiastical Academy, occupying a wing of the Skete of St. Andrew in Karyes, following the Greek secondary school curriculum combined with ecclesiastical education.)

From 1990 to 1991 he was the Superintendent of Secondary Education in the Province of Vyoteia (Boeotia Prefecture).

Subsequently, he served in the Office of Educational Affairs, at the Consulate General of Greece in Toronto, from 1991 to 1993.

=== Ordination and ministry ===
He was ordained to the deaconate on July 11, 1986, and to the priesthood on July 12, 1986 by Metropolitan Ieronymos of Thebes and Livadia. On July 13, 1986 he was advanced to the rank of Archimandrite at the Metropolis of Thebes and Livadeia.

Thereafter he worked periodically as a missionary, first in South Korea in 1989, then in Hong Kong in 1992 and again from 1994–1995.

In Toronto, Christophoros served as the parish priest at the historic Saint George's Greek Orthodox Church in downtown Toronto from 1997 to 1999. Concurrently, he became the first Dean of the Toronto Orthodox Theological Academy, from October 1997 through to June 2006. (Note: "The Toronto Orthodox Theological Academy is affiliated with St. Paul's University in Ottawa, Ontario, and offers a four-year course in Theological Studies. A Bachelor of Theology Degree is awarded from St. Paul's University upon completion of course requirements.") During his deanship the first cohorts of students graduated from the Academy, were ordained as priests, and proceeded to serve Greek Orthodox communities across Canada.

In 1999 he was named as titular Bishop of Andida, which was a former Diocese of the Metropolis of Pergis in Asia Minor. (Note: A late 11th century liturgical text known as the Protheoria was authored by Nicholas and Theodore of Andida.) He was elected Auxiliary Bishop of the Greek Orthodox Metropolis of Toronto (Canada) on June 10, 1999 and was ordained as Bishop on June 26, 1999. The consecration took place at the Church of St. Nicholas in Scarborough, with five consecrating hierarchs participating:

- Metropolitan Archbishop Sotirios (Athanassoulas), who presided at the consecration;
- Metropolitan Anthony (Gergiannakis) of Dardanellion and San Francisco;
- Metropolitan Maximos (Aghiorgoussis) of Ainos and Pittsburgh;
- Bishop Yurij (Kalistchuk) of the Ukrainian Orthodox Church of Canada; and
- Bishop Vasileios (Karayannis) of Trimythountos from the Church of Cyprus.

Christophoros attended the Extraordinary Sobor of the Ukrainian Orthodox Church of Canada held from August 22–24, 2008 in Saskatoon, representing Patriarch Bartholomew I. (Note: The Extraordinary Sobor's purpose was to elect two new bishops for the Church and pass a new set of bylaws, as well as to celebrate the 90th anniversary of the founding of the UOCC in Saskatoon. The Sobor elected Bishops Hilarion (Rudnyk) to become the Bishop of Edmonton, and Andrew (Peshko) to become the Bishop of Saskatoon. This recreated a new Council of Bishops of the UOCC. Bishop Ilarion's election was ratified in October 2008, by the Synod of the Ecumenical Patriarchate, and he was enthroned by Metropolitan John (Stinka) on Sunday, October 26, 2008.)

Bishop Christophoros also took part at the inaugural meeting of the Episcopal Assembly of North and Central America from May 26–28, 2010, representing the Greek Orthodox Metropolis of Toronto (Canada).

== Death ==
Bishop Christophoros died on February 14, 2020, aged 89, in Greece. He was interred at the Hosios Loukas monastery in Boeotia, Greece, where he was a brother.

== Sources ==
- Christophoros Rakintzakis. Orthodoxia: Institute for Ecumenical Studies, Université de Fribourg, Switzerland.
- Bishop Christophoros (Rakintzakis). Canadian Orthodox Christian History Project.
- (in Greek) His Grace Bishop Christoforos. Greek Orthodox Metropolis of Toronto (Canada).
- (in Greek) Ἀνδίδων κ. Χριστοφόρος. The Ecumenical Patriarchate of Constantinople.

As of January 30, 2017, this article is derived in whole or in part from Orthodox Wiki. The copyright holder has licensed the content in a manner that permits reuse under CC BY-SA 3.0 and GFDL. All relevant terms must be followed. The original text was at "Christophoros (Rakintzakis) of Andida"
