= List of cathedrals in Canada =

This is a list of cathedrals in Canada, that is, seats of bishops in episcopal denominations including the Anglican Church of Canada, Catholic Church, and Eastern Orthodox Church, among others.

== Alberta ==
=== Anglican ===
- All Saints' Anglican Cathedral in Edmonton
- Cathedral Church of the Redeemer in Calgary
- St. James' Cathedral in Peace River

=== Catholic ===
- Saint-Jean-Baptiste Cathedral in McLennan
- St. Mary's Cathedral in Calgary
- St. Joseph's Basilica in Edmonton
- St. Josaphat's Cathedral in Edmonton (Ukrainian Catholic)
- St. Paul's Cathedral in St. Paul

=== Orthodox ===
- All Saints' Orthodox Cathedral in Edmonton (Autonomous Orthodox Metropolia of North & South America & the British Isles)
- St. Barbara's Cathedral in Edmonton (Russian Orthodox Church in Canada)
- St. John Cathedral in Edmonton (Ukrainian Orthodox)
- St. Vladimir's Russian Orthodox Cathedral in Edmonton (Old Calendarists)

== British Columbia ==
=== Anglican ===
- Cathedral Church of St. Michael and All Angels in Kelowna
- St. Saviour's Pro-Cathedral in Nelson
  - St. Saviour's was the Cathedral for the Diocese of Kootenay until 1987, when St. Michael and All Angels' was consecrated by the Rt. Rev'd R.E.F. Berry as the new Cathedral for the Diocese.
- Christ Church Cathedral in Vancouver
- Christ Church Cathedral in Victoria
- Holy Trinity Cathedral in New Westminster
  - Cathedral for the diocese of New Westminster until 1929 (now a parish church).
  - The cathedral for New Westminster diocese is currently Christ Church Cathedral in Vancouver (since 1929).
- St. Andrew's Cathedral in Prince Rupert
- St. Paul's Cathedral in Kamloops
- Cathedral of Saint John the Evangelist in Victoria (Anglican Catholic)

=== Catholic ===
- Mary Immaculate Cathedral in Nelson
- Holy Eucharist Cathedral in Vancouver (Ukrainian Catholic)
- Holy Rosary Cathedral in Vancouver
- Sacred Heart Cathedral in Kamloops
- Sacred Heart Cathedral in Prince George
- St. Andrew's Cathedral in Victoria

=== Orthodox ===
- Holy Trinity Ukrainian Orthodox Cathedral in Vancouver (Ukrainian Orthodox)
- St. George's Greek Orthodox Cathedral in Vancouver (Greek Orthodox)

== Manitoba ==
=== Anglican ===
- St. Matthew's Cathedral in Brandon
- Cathedral of St. John in Winnipeg

=== Catholic ===
- Our Lady of the Sacred Heart Cathedral in The Pas
- Saint-Boniface Cathedral in Winnipeg
- St. Mary's Cathedral in Winnipeg
- Cathedral of Sts. Vladimir and Olga in Winnipeg (Ukrainian Catholic)

=== Orthodox ===
- Holy Trinity Metropolitan Cathedral in Winnipeg (Ukrainian Orthodox)

== New Brunswick ==
=== Anglican ===
- Christ Church Cathedral in Fredericton

=== Catholic ===
- Sacré-Coeur Cathedral in Bathurst
- Immaculée-Conception Cathedral in Edmundston
- Notre-Dame-de-l'Assomption Cathedral in Moncton
- Cathedral of the Immaculate Conception in Saint John
- St. Michael's Basilica in Miramichi

== Newfoundland and Labrador ==
=== Anglican ===
- Cathedral Church of St. John the Evangelist in Corner Brook
- St. Martin's Cathedral in Gander
- Cathedral of St. John the Baptist in St. John's

=== Catholic ===
- Holy Redeemer Cathedral in Corner Brook
- Cathedral of the Immaculate Conception in Harbour Grace
- Immaculate Conception Cathedral in Grand Falls-Windsor
- Basilica of Our Lady of Perpetual Help in Labrador City
- Basilica of St. John the Baptist in St. John's

== Nova Scotia ==
=== Anglican ===
- All Saints' Cathedral in Halifax
- St. Aidan's pro-Cathedral in Halifax (Anglican Catholic Church of Canada)

=== Catholic ===
- St. Ninian's Cathedral in Antigonish
- St. Mary's Basilica in Halifax
- St. Ambrose co-Cathedral in Yarmouth

== Ontario ==
=== Anglican ===
- Cathedral Church of St. James in Toronto
- Christ's Church Cathedral in Hamilton
- Christ Church Cathedral in Ottawa
- St. Alban's Cathedral in Kenora
- St. George's Cathedral in Kingston
- St. Luke's Cathedral in Sault Ste. Marie
- St. Paul's Cathedral in London

=== Catholic ===
- Cathedral of St. Anthony of Padua in Timmins
- Cathedral of St. Catherine of Alexandria in St. Catharines
- Cathedral of St. Peter-in-Chains in Peterborough
- Cathedral of the Nativity of the Mother of God in Toronto (Slovak Byzantine Catholic)
- Cathedral of the Transfiguration of Our Lord in Markham (Slovak Byzantine Catholic)
- Christ the King Cathedral in Moosonee
- Christ the King Cathedral in Hamilton
- Co-Cathedral of the Nativity in Cornwall
- Notre-Dame Cathedral Basilica in Ottawa
- Notre-Dame-de-l'Assomption Cathedral in Hearst
- Precious Blood Cathedral in Sault Ste. Marie
- Pro-Cathedral of the Assumption in North Bay
- St. Alphonsa Cathedral in Mississauga (Syro-Malabar Catholic)
- St. Columbkille Cathedral in Pembroke
- St. Finnan's Basilica in Alexandria
- St. John's Cathedral in Toronto (Polish National Catholic Church)
- St. Josaphat's Cathedral in Toronto (Ukrainian Catholic)
- St. Mary's Cathedral in Kingston
- St. Michael's Cathedral Basilica in Toronto
- St. Patrick Cathedral in Thunder Bay
- St. Peter's Cathedral Basilica in London

=== Eastern Orthodox ===
- Cathedral of the Annunciation of the Virgin Mary in Toronto (Greek Orthodox)
- Christ the Saviour Cathedral in Toronto (Orthodox Church in America)
- Holy Trinity Cathedral in Ottawa
- Holy Trinity Cathedral in Toronto (Russian Orthodox Church Outside Russia)
- St. Clement of Ohrid Cathedral in Toronto (Macedonian Orthodox)
- St. Volodymyr's Cathedral in Toronto (Ukrainian Orthodox)
- Ss. Cyril and Methodius Cathedral in Toronto (Macedonian-Bulgarian Orthodox)

=== Oriental Orthodox ===
- St. Mark's Coptic Orthodox Church in Markham
- Menbere Berhan Kidest Mariam (Saint Mary) Cathedral in Toronto (Ethiopian Orthodox Tewahedo Church)

=== Assyrian Church of the East ===
- St. Mary's Cathedral in Toronto

== Prince Edward Island ==
=== Anglican ===
- St. Peter's Cathedral in Charlottetown

=== Catholic ===
- Cathedral Basilica of St. Dunstan in Charlottetown

== Quebec ==
=== Anglican ===
- Christ Church Anglican Cathedral in Montreal
- Holy Trinity Cathedral in Quebec City

=== Oriental Orthodox ===
- St. Gregory the Illuminator Cathedral in Montreal (Armenian Church in Canada) (Etchmiadzin)
- Saint Hagop Cathedral in Montreal (Armenian Prelacy of Canada) (Cilicia)

=== Catholic ===
- Basilica Cathedral of St. Cecilia in Salaberry-de-Valleyfield
- Cathedral-Basilica of Notre-Dame de Québec in Quebec City
- Christ-Roi Cathedral in Gaspé
- De l'Assomption (Immaculée-Conception) Cathedral in Trois-Rivières
- Mary, Queen of the World Cathedral in Montreal
- Notre-Dame-de-Fourvière Cathedral in Mont-Laurier
- Saint-Antoine Cathedral in Longueuil
- Saint-Charles-Borromée Cathedral in Joliette
- Saint-François-Xavier Cathedral in Saguenay
- Saint-Germain Cathedral in Rimouski
- Saint-Hyacinthe-le-Confesseur Cathedral in Saint-Hyacinthe
- Saint-Jean-Baptiste Cathedral in Nicolet
- Saint-Jean-l'Évangéliste Cathedral in Saint-Jean-sur-Richelieu
- Saint-Jean-Eudes Cathedral in Baie-Comeau
- Saint-Jean-Marie-Vianney Cathedral in Gatineau
- Saint-Jérôme Cathedral in Saint-Jérôme
- Saint-Joseph Cathedral in Rouyn-Noranda
- Saint-Joseph Co-Cathedral in Gatineau
- Saint-Maron Cathedral in Montreal (Maronite Catholic)
- Saint-Matthieu Pro-Cathedral in Saint-Hyacinthe
- Saint-Michel-Archange Former Cathedral in Rouyn-Noranda
- Saint-Michel Cathedral Basilica in Sherbrooke
- Saint-Sauveur Cathedral in Montreal (Greek-Melkite Catholic)
- Sainte-Amélie Pro-Cathedral in Baie-Comeau
- Sainte-Anne Cathedral in La Pocatière
- Sainte-Thérèse-d'Avila Cathedral in Amos

=== Orthodox ===
- St. Sophie Cathedral in Montreal (Ukrainian Orthodox)
- St. Nicholas Russian Orthodox Cathedral in Montreal (Russian Orthodox Church Outside Russia)
- St. Peter and St. Paul Cathedral in Montreal (Orthodox Church in America)

== Saskatchewan ==
=== Anglican ===
- St. Paul's Cathedral in Regina
- St Peter's Church of England pro-Cathedral in Qu'Appelle
- St. Alban's Cathedral in Prince Albert
- Cathedral of St. John in Saskatoon

=== Catholic ===
- Cathedral of St. George in Saskatoon (Ukrainian Catholic)
- Holy Family Cathedral in Saskatoon
- Holy Rosary Cathedral in Regina
- Our Lady of Assumption Co-Cathedral in Gravelbourg
- Sacred Heart Cathedral in Prince Albert
- St. Paul's Cathedral in Saskatoon
- St. Peter's Co-Cathedral in Muenster

=== Orthodox ===
- Holy Trinity Cathedral in Saskatoon (Ukrainian Orthodox)
- St George's Cathedral in Regina (Romanian Orthodox)

== The Territories ==
=== Anglican ===
- Christ Church Cathedral in Whitehorse
- St. Jude's Cathedral in Iqaluit

=== Catholic ===
- Sacred Heart Cathedral in Whitehorse
- Saint-Joseph Cathedral in Fort Smith

== See also ==
- Anglican Church of Canada
- Anglican Catholic Church of Canada
- List of Anglican cathedrals in Canada
- Catholicism in Canada
- Lists of cathedrals
