= St. Volodymyr's Ukrainian Orthodox Cathedral (Toronto) =

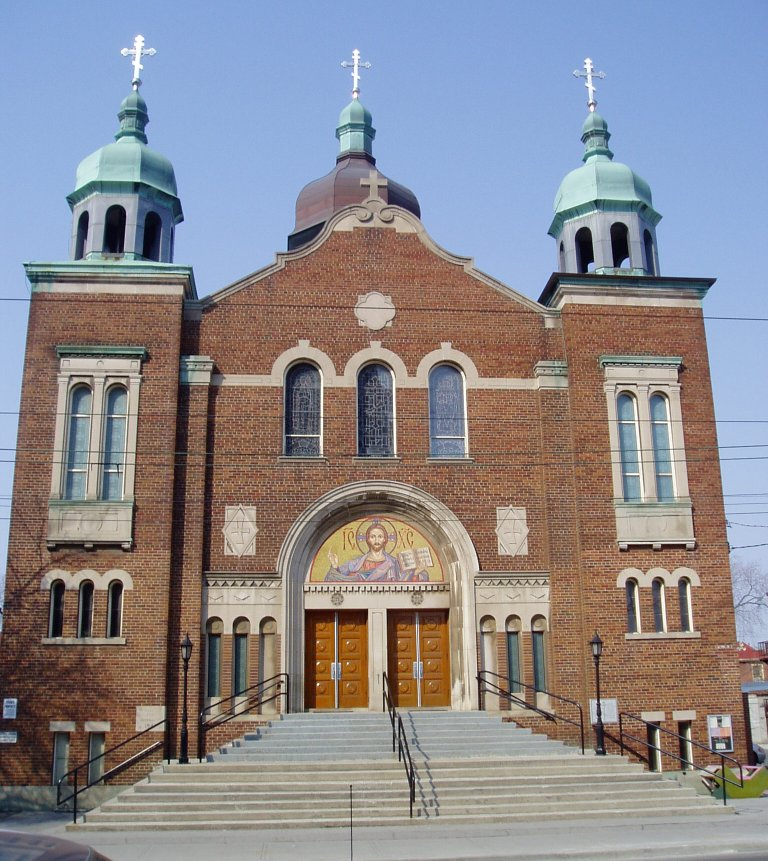
- View of St. Volodymyr's from Bathurst Street
- St. Volodymyr's Ukrainian Orthodox Cathedral
- 43.653845°N 79.406932°W
- Location: 400 Bathurst Street, Toronto, Ontario; M5T 2S6
- Country: Canada
- Denomination: Eastern Orthodox
- Website: stvolodymyr.ca/

History
- Status: Cathedral

Architecture
- Functional status: Active
- Style: Byzantine Revival
- Groundbreaking: 1946
- Completed: 1948

Administration
- Metropolis: Ukrainian Orthodox Church of Canada
- Diocese: Eastern Canada

Clergy
- Archbishop: Yurij
- Priest: Rev. Buciora

St. Volodymyr's Ukrainian Orthodox Cathedral (Ukrainian: Український православний собор святого Володимира is a Ukrainian Orthodox Cathedral in Toronto, Ontario, Canada located on Bathurst Street just to the west of Kensington Market. The majority of the first Ukrainian immigrants to Canada were Eastern Catholic believers with only a small fraction belonging to the Eastern Orthodox faith. This changed with later waves of immigration that saw more people coming from the Orthodox east. The first Ukrainian Orthodox Union in Toronto was established in 1926. For several years they met in rented halls and in churches of other denominations. The land on Bathurst was purchased in 1935. Work on the cathedral began in 1946 and was completed two years later. The cathedral is in the standard Byzantine style used throughout Ukraine.

== Clergy ==
Through the decades, a number of Ukrainian priests have presided over St. Volodymyr's Cathedral including:

- Rev. Fotiy (1948-1975)
- Rev. Ferentsiv (1976-1984)
- Rev. Bozhyk (1984-1995)
- Rev. Sencio (1996-2020)
- Rev. Buciora (2020–present)

St. Volodymyr's Cathedral has been the Cathedral seat for the following bishops of the UOCC:

- Metropolitan Michael (Theodot Khoroshy)
- Archbishop Nicholas (Debryn)
- Metropolitan Wasyly (actually resided in Winnipeg (where the UOCC's head offices are located), due to the ailing health of Metropolitan Andrew (Metiuk))
- Archbishop Yurij (Archbishop Yurij lives and serves Toronto and the East, but remains bishop of Saskatoon in name due to the Greek Metropolis (also united with Constantinople) having their headquarters in Toronto)

== See also ==
- List of Orthodox churches in Toronto
- Ukrainian Orthodox Church of Canada
- Archbishop of Toronto and Eastern Canada
