= Eparchy of Canada =

The term Eparchy of Canada may refer to:

- Serbian Orthodox Eparchy of Canada, Canadian eparchy (diocese) of the Serbian Orthodox Church
- Romanian Orthodox Eparchy of Canada, Canadian eparchy (diocese) of the Romanian Orthodox Church
- Russian Orthodox Eparchy of Montreal and Canada, Canadian eparchy (diocese) of the Russian Orthodox Church Outside Russia
- Ukrainian Orthodox Eparchy of Central Canada, one of eparchies (dioceses) of the Ukrainian Orthodox Church of Canada
- Ukrainian Orthodox Eparchy of Eastern Canada, one of eparchies (dioceses) of the Ukrainian Orthodox Church of Canada
- Ukrainian Orthodox Eparchy of Western Canada, one of eparchies (dioceses) of the Ukrainian Orthodox Church of Canada
- Macedonian Orthodox Eparchy of America and Canada, an eparchy (diocese) of the Macedonian Orthodox Church
- Armenian Eparchy of Canada (Cilicia), Canadian eparchy (diocese) of the Armenian Apostolic Church, under the Holy See of Cilicia
- Assyrian Eparchy of Canada, Canadian eparchy (diocese) of the Assyrian Church of the East

== See also ==
- Christianity in Canada
- Diocese of Canada (disambiguation)
- Eparchy of Eastern America (disambiguation)
- Eparchy of Western America (disambiguation)
