= Holy Trinity Ukrainian Orthodox Metropolitan Cathedral =

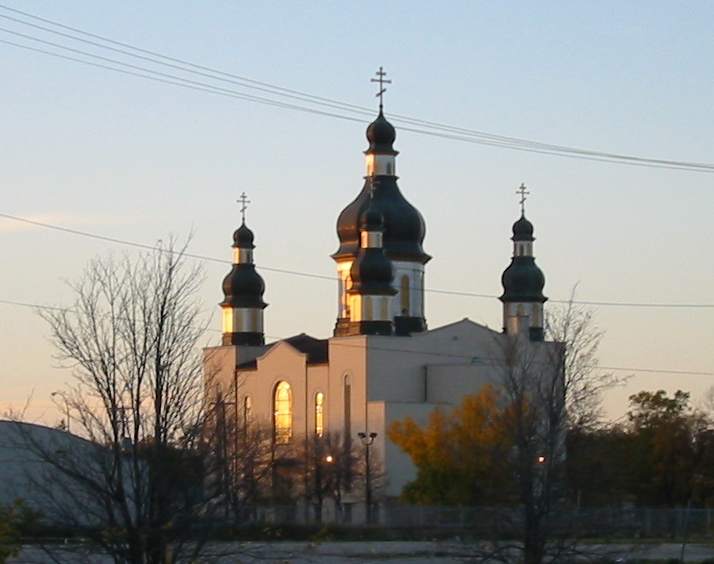
- Holy Trinity Ukrainian Orthodox Metropolitan Cathedral
- 49.9186°N 97.1291°W
- Location: 1175 Main Street; Winnipeg, Manitoba, Canada; R2W 3S4
- Denomination: Eastern Orthodox
- Website: www.htuomc.org

History
- Status: Cathedral
- Dedicated: September 11, 1949
- Consecrated: September 30, 1951

Architecture
- Functional status: Active
- Style: 20th-century Eastern Orthodox

Administration
- Diocese: Ukrainian Orthodox Eparchy of Central Canada

Clergy
- Archbishop: Hilarion (Rudnyk)
- Dean: Fr. Eugene Maximiuk

Holy Trinity Ukrainian Orthodox Metropolitan Cathedral is in Winnipeg, Manitoba, Canada, and is the primatial throne of the Ukrainian Orthodox Church of Canada.

== History ==
The history of the Ukrainian Orthodox Holy Trinity Cathedral can be traced back to December 1945, when a group of prominent individuals met at St. Andrew's College to discuss the need of a new parish in Winnipeg's north end. The founding meeting took place on April 9, 1946, and the site was purchased on May 16, 1946.

Since the Ukrainian Orthodox Church of Canada did not have a cathedral parish in the Metropolitan See of Winnipeg, a special meeting of the Holy Trinity membership requested to Sobor IX, to grant the parish the status of the Cathedral of All-Canada.

At Sobor IX, held in Saskatoon in 1946 and the Special Sobor held in 1951 in Winnipeg, the parish was assigned as the Cathedral of the UOCC and All-Canada with all its fixed assets becoming property of the Ukrainian Orthodox Church of Canada. With its new title the cathedral parish was instructed to build a suitable cathedral proper.

On September 11, 1949, the site was blessed and construction commenced. The cornerstone was blessed and laid on September 30, 1951, and in June 1952, the basement of the cathedral was officially opened. Church life was prospering and funds were being collected throughout the country, and building plans were finalized for the cathedral proper.

The cathedral was officially opened and consecrated on July 8, 1962, by the Primate of the Ukrainian Orthodox Church of Canada, Metropolitan Ilarion (Ohienko). The icon-screen of Iconostasis was installed in 1974, and the mosaic depicting the Holy Trinity, at the front of the cathedral, facing Main Street was installed for the Millennium of Ukrainian Orthodoxy (1988), and was blessed by Metropolitan Wasyly.

As a 50th Anniversary project, stained glass windows were installed and icons were painted inside the sanctuary. The Institute for stained glass in Canada has documented the stained glass at Holy Eucharist Ukrainian Catholic Church.
