= Diocese of Canada =

The term Diocese of Canada may refer to:

- Anglican Diocese of Canada, Canadian diocese of the Anglican Church in North America
- Armenian Diocese of Canada (Cilicia), Canadian diocese of the Armenian Apostolic Church, under the Holy See of Cilicia
- Assyrian Diocese of Canada, Canadian diocese of the Assyrian Church of the East
- Malankara Orthodox Diocese of Canada, Canadian diocese of the Malankara Orthodox Syrian Church
- Macedonian Orthodox Diocese of America and Canada, a diocese of the Macedonian Orthodox Church
- Romanian Orthodox Diocese of Canada, Canadian diocese of the Romanian Orthodox Church
- Russian Orthodox Diocese of Montreal and Canada, Canadian diocese of the Russian Orthodox Church Outside Russia
- Serbian Orthodox Diocese of Canada, Canadian diocese of the Serbian Orthodox Church
- Ukrainian Orthodox Diocese of Central Canada, one of dioceses of the Ukrainian Orthodox Church of Canada
- Ukrainian Orthodox Diocese of Eastern Canada, one of dioceses of the Ukrainian Orthodox Church of Canada
- Ukrainian Orthodox Diocese of Western Canada, one of dioceses of the Ukrainian Orthodox Church of Canada

== See also ==
- Christianity in Canada
- Eparchy of Canada (disambiguation)
