= Oleksandr Zaremba =

Ukrainian historian, and civic activist (born 1978)

- Олександр Заремба
- Born: Oleksandr Oleksandrovych Zaremba; 1 June 1978 (age 48)
- Education: Kamianets-Podilskyi National Pedagogical University
- Occupation: Historian

Oleksandr Oleksandrovych Zaremba (Ukrainian: Олександр Олександрович Заремба, born 1 June 1978, Kashira, Moscow Oblast) is a Ukrainian historian, military reenactor, festival organizer, and civic activist.

== Biography ==
In 1987, his family moved to Kamianets-Podilskyi.

Zaremba graduated from Faculty of History (2000) and postgraduate studies (2006) at Kamianets-Podilskyi National Pedagogical University. He worked as a representative of the Ukrzovnishintour corporation in Kamianets-Podilskyi (2006–2007) and as a private entrepreneur (provided excursion services), head of the marketing, investment and development department (2011–2016), and since 2016 as the director of the Kamianets-Podilskyi State Historical Museum-Reserve.

He is the founder and head of the Kamianets-Podilskyi Military History Society, which is known for its historical reenactment festivals Terra heroica (2005–2009; since 2010, the Schola millitaria festival), The Last Capital, "Остання столиця" Archaeological Picnic, and Ruthenica Medievalis 2020.

From 2007 to 2011, he was a member of the board of the Ratusha Festival Agency.

In 2017, the Kamianets-Podilskyi Museum-Reserve under the leadership of Oleksandr Zaremba received UAH 7.2 million in revenue.

He runs the YouTube channel Haiduk Kamieniec, where he talks about historical reconstruction, military history of Ukraine, and life in the seventeenth century.
