= Peshko =

Peshko is an East Slavic language surname. Notable people with the surname include:

- Andrew Peshko (born 1972; birth name: Bohdan Peshko), Ukrainian-Canadian bishop

== See also ==
- Peszko, Polish variant of the surname
