= Bishop of Winnipeg =

Several religious offices with seats in Winnipeg carry the title Bishop (or similar):

- the Anglican Bishop of the Diocese of Rupert's Land
- the Roman Catholic Archbishop of the Archdiocese of Winnipeg
- the Roman Catholic Archbishop of the Archdiocese of Saint Boniface
- the Ukrainian Catholic Archbishop of the Archeparchy of Winnipeg (who is the head of the church in Canada)
- the Ukrainian Orthodox Archbishop of Winnipeg and the Central Diocese (who is also Primate of the Ukrainian Orthodox Church of Canada)
