= Eparchy of Eastern America =

The term Eparchy of Eastern America or Diocese of Eastern America may refer to:

- Serbian Orthodox Eparchy of Eastern America, an eparchy (diocese) of the Serbian Orthodox Church
  - Serbian Orthodox Eparchy of Eastern America and Canada, former eparchy (1963-1983) of the Serbian Orthodox Church, in eastern USA and Canada
- Russian Orthodox Eparchy of Eastern America and New York, an eparchy (diocese) of the Russian Orthodox Church Outside Russia
- Armenian Eparchy of Eastern America, an eparchy (diocese) of the Armenian Apostolic Church, under the Holy See of Cilicia
- Assyrian Eparchy of Eastern America, an eparchy (diocese) of the Assyrian Church of the East

== See also ==
- Christianity in the United States
- Eparchy of Western America (disambiguation)
- Eparchy of Canada (disambiguation)
