= Centre for Ukrainian Canadian Studies =

Coordinates: 49°48′39″N 97°08′27″W

- Type: College & University
- Established: 1981
- Director: Yuliia Ivaniuk
- Location: Winnipeg, Manitoba, Canada
- Campus: Urban
- Website: umanitoba.ca/faculties/arts/departments/ukrainian_canadian_studies/index.html

The Centre for Ukrainian Canadian Studies (CUCS) was founded in 1981, as a joint creation between the University of Manitoba and St. Andrew's College. The mission of the Centre is to create, preserve and communicate knowledge dealing with Ukrainian Canadian culture and scholarship. It is located in Winnipeg, Manitoba.

The Centre for Ukrainian Canadian Studies, provides undergraduate courses and interdisciplinary programs of study in areas relating to Ukrainian Canadian culture. The Centre also encourages and promotes research and scholarship in all areas relating to Ukrainian Canadian Heritage Studies.

The Centre offers nineteen courses in areas such as Ukrainian language, Ukrainian Canadian literature and folklore, the history of Ukraine and of the Ukrainians in Canada, the geography of Ukraine, the government and politics of Ukraine, Eastern Christianity, Byzantine art, and the Ukrainian arts in Canada. These courses can be taken singly, for general interest, as options, or as components of programs in various departments in the Faculty of Arts or in the School of Art.

For students interested in specializing in the area, the Centre offers interdisciplinary programs in Ukrainian Canadian Heritage Studies leading to a Bachelor of Arts degree with a general major, an advanced major, or a minor in this field. The University of Manitoba is the only university in Canada which offers undergraduate degree programs in Ukrainian Canadian Heritage Studies.

The Centre offers courses on the University of Manitoba campus, and at off-campus locations in Winnipeg. From time to time, the Centre is also able to offer courses at other locations in Manitoba and through teleconference, as well as specialized programs during the summer.

Although the Centre does not offer graduate courses, it is possible to pursue graduate work in Ukrainian Canadian Heritage Studies at the M.A. and Ph.D. levels through Interdisciplinary Programs in the Faculty of Graduate Studies at the University of Manitoba. Several fellowships are available.

Individual scholars are encouraged to pursue their own research agenda within a Ukrainian Canadian context. Topics of current interest include an exploration of Ukrainian Canadian history, the occurrence of Ukrainian Canadiana within North American popular culture, explorations of Ukrainian Canadian arts including folklore, fine arts, and literature, issues in genealogy, and the study of music both popular and classical) with a Ukrainian Canadian focus.

An additional new direction is the development of an online course on Ukrainian Canadian folklore.

The Centre, since 2002, has held a bi-annual Tarnawecky Distinguished Lecture program at the University of Manitoba. This program is intended to bring academics and experts as speakers to the University.

The current coordinator, as of 2022, is Yuliia Ivaniuk.
