= Eparchy of Western America =

The term Eparchy of Western America or Diocese of Western America may refer to:

- Serbian Orthodox Eparchy of Western America, an eparchy (diocese) of the Serbian Orthodox Church
- Russian Orthodox Eparchy of Western America and San Francisco, an eparchy (diocese) of the Russian Orthodox Church Outside Russia
- Armenian Eparchy of Western America, an eparchy (diocese) of the Armenian Apostolic Church, under the Holy See of Cilicia
- Assyrian Eparchy of Western America, an eparchy (diocese) of the Assyrian Church of the East

== See also ==
- Christianity in the United States
- Eparchy of Eastern America (disambiguation)
- Eparchy of Canada (disambiguation)
