= Yurij Kalistchuk =

Canadian priest

Metropolitan Yurij (Kalistchuk) of Winnipeg and Canada, born George Kalistchuk in Lachine, Quebec, on May 26, 1951, was the primate of the autonomous Ukrainian Orthodox Church of Canada from 2010 to 2021, is a Metropolitan-Emeritus of the Ukrainian Orthodox Church of Canada.

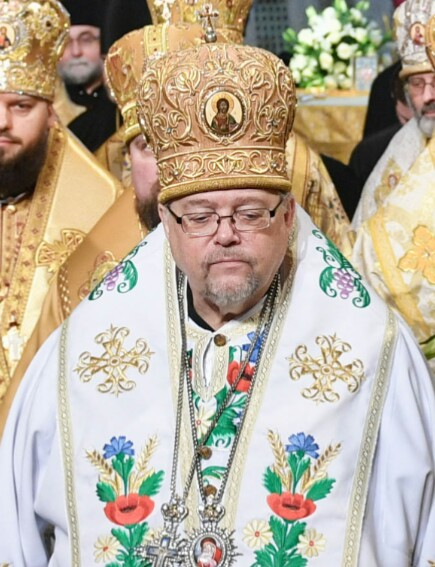
Yurij (Kalistchuk)

== Youth ==
Although resident in Lachine, Quebec (just outside Montreal), when the future metropolitan was born, in 1963 the Ukrainian-Canadian Kalistchuk family moved to Hamilton, Ontario, where the family became members of St. Vladimir's Ukrainian Orthodox Cathedral. The young George attended Ukrainian School, was involved in Ukrainian dance, the cathedral choir (where he became choir conductor in 1981–1982), and the Ukrainian Youth Organization (CYMK).

== Family ==
Kalistchuk had two brothers, Albin (who died at a young age) and William. William Kalistchuk currently lives in Mississauga, Ontario, with his wife Janice and children David, Michael, Peter, and Emilie Kalistchuk. George Kalistchuk's father, Peter Kalistchuk, died in 2002, and his mother, Anastazia Kalistchuk, died on May 3, 2020, in Toronto, Ontario.

== University ==
In 1970 he entered St. Andrew's College (the UOCC's Seminary), and during his three-year stay at the college he obtained many awards for his academic, musical and athletic activities at the University of Manitoba. From 1971 to 1973 he was assistant conductor under Archbishop Boris (Yakovkevych) and later Pavlo Macenko for the Theology Student Choir. In 1973 George received his Licentiate in Theology (L.Th.), which was replaced by a Bachelor of Theology (B.Th.) in 1985. Beginning in 1975 George studied music at McMaster University, graduating in 1980 with a Bachelor of Music in History and Theory.

In 1984 he completed a Bachelor of Education degree at the University of Toronto and received an Ontario's Teacher's Certificate. During 1983-1984 he was Dean of Men at St. Vladimir Institute in Toronto.

== Priesthood and episcopacy ==
In Hamilton, Ontario, on July 17, 1988, he was ordained a priest, and was assigned as rector of Holy Trinity Ukrainian Orthodox Metropolitan Cathedral in Winnipeg. At a special sobor (council) in 1989, George was elected bishop, and later consecrated to the episcopacy on October 22, 1989, in Winnipeg by Metropolitan Wasyly and Bishop John (Stinka). In Saskatoon, Saskatchewan, on December 17, 1989, he was installed as Bishop of Saskatoon and auxiliary of the Central Eparchy of the UOCC. In 1995 he was elected Bishop of Toronto and the Eastern Eparchy, and in 2001 he was elevated to the rank of archbishop.

On July 18, 2010, at the 20th Sobor of the UOCC, Archbishop Yurij was nominated to succeed John (Stinka) as the sixth Metropolitan of Winnipeg and Canada and primate of the church. Archbishop Yurij was formally elected Metropolitan of Winnipeg on August 30, 2010, by the Holy Synod of the Ecumenical Patriarchate of Constantinople, to which the UOCC belongs, and enthroned at Holy Trinity Metropolitan Cathedral on November 21, 2010.

== The arrival in Canada of Patriarch Filaret ==
On April 19, 2012, Metropolitan Yurij (Kalistchuk) wrote a letter to the clergy and parish councils banning the uncanonical, defrocked, and excommunicated Filaret (Denysenko) from visiting any church or property owned by the Ukrainian Orthodox Church during his trip to Canada. The ban included prohibiting any clergyman or member of the Consistory Board to be in the vicinity of Filaret during his visit.

Yurij's letter upset some members of St Volodymyr's Cathedral in Toronto. The ban was publicly criticized and ignored as a banquet honouring Patriarch Filaret was held at St. Volydymyr Cultural Centre in Oakville on April 21, 2012, where Filaret toured the cemetery, chapel, and met with leaders of the Ukrainian Canadian community including Paul Grod, President of the Ukrainian Canadian Congress.

In a show of support by the Ukrainian Greek Catholic Church of Canada, Filaret was invited to attend the Divine Liturgy at St. Demetrius Ukrainian Catholic Church the following day in Toronto. At the conclusion of the Liturgy, Filaret awarded Rev. John Tataryn the Order of St. Volodymyr, 3rd Degree.

The letter sparked coverage in the Ukrainian Canadian media (Svitohliad, Kontakt, Ukrainian News Edmonton, UkeTube, and social media), and led to the creation of the Brotherhood for the Revitalization of the Ukrainian Orthodoxy in Canada (BRUOC), Facebook groups, and many YouTube videos forcing Metropolitan Yurij to respond. This Brotherhood is not recognized by the Ukrainian Orthodox Church of Canada.

In an information seminar a few members of the Ukrainian Orthodox Church of Canada expressed concern that the church was being sold out to the Russian Orthodox Church and that legal action must be taken. Video on YouTube

== Sources ==
- Consecration and Installation Book of Bishop Yurij (Kalistchuk)
- @ UOCC.CA

Preceded by John (Stinka)	Bishop of Saskatoon (UOCC); 1985-1995	Succeeded by Andrew (Peshko)
Preceded by Basil (Fedak)	Bishop of Toronto (UOCC); 1995-2010	Succeeded by Andrew (Peshko)
Preceded by Metropolitan John (Stinka)	Archbishop of Winnipeg and the Central Diocese, Metropolitan and Primate of the Ukrainian Orthodox Church of Canada (UOCC); 2010-2021	Succeeded by Metropolitan Hilarion (Rudnyk)
