= Wasyly Fedak =

Metropolitan Wasyly
- Born: Vasyl' Fedak; November 1, 1909; Kadubivtsi, Duchy of Bukovina, Austria-Hungary
- Died: January 10, 2005 (aged 95); Canada
- Occupation: Primate of the Ukrainian Orthodox Church of Canada

Metropolitan Wasyly or Basil, OC (secular name William Fedak; November 1, 1909 – January 10, 2005) was the Primate of the Ukrainian Orthodox Church of Canada (UOCC) from 1985 until his death in 2005.

Metropolitan Wasyly (Vasylii) was born Vasyl' Fedak on November 1, 1909, in Kadubivtsi in Austrian-ruled northern Bukovina (now Chernivtsi Oblast in Ukraine). Together with his parents and five siblings, he immigrated to Canada and settled in Sheho, Saskatchewan. In young adulthood, he became a teacher: a career that lasted 14 years. He then studied at a seminary of the UOCC from 1941 to 1944. He was ordained into the diaconate on September 27, 1944, and shortly thereafter into the priesthood on October 1. As a priest, he served parishes in Manitoba and Ontario. In 1951, he arrived in Hamilton, Ontario to serve the parish of St. Vladimir. He served this parish for 29 years, seeing the parish grow from 47 to 500 families.

His wife, Paraskeviya Tymofij, whom he married in 1932, died in April 1976. Two years later, an Extraordinary Sobor (general council) of the UOCC elected him as its candidate for bishop. On July 16, 1978, he was consecrated as the bishop of Saskatoon at Holy Trinity Cathedral in Winnipeg by Metropolitan Andrew (Metiuk)of Winnipeg, Archbishop Borys (Yakovkevych), and Bishop Mykolai (Debryn)]of Toronto. Following the death of then Archbishop Mykolai in 1981, Bishop Wasyly became the acting bishop of the Eastern Eparchy. He was elevated to Archbishop of Toronto in 1983. Then in 1985, the 17th Sobor of the UOCC selected Wasyly to be its metropolitan and primate with the honorific His Beatitude (because he was the head of his own church. After the UOCC joined the Patriarchate of Constantinople, the honorific for metropolitans is now His Eminence), and he will be the last hierarch (bishop) to hold that title in the UOCC, as decided by Patriarch Bartholemew I. As primate, he was the spiritual leader of the Ukrainian Orthodox Church of Canada and Chancellor of its seminary, St. Andrew's College.

Under the leadership of Metropolitan Wasyly, the UOCC came into full communion with the Patriarchate of Constantinople in 1990. In 1993, he was made an Officer of the Order of Canada.

Metropolitan Wasyly reposed on January 10, 2005. His funeral took place on January 21–22 at Holy Trinity Metropolitan Cathedral in Winnipeg. He is buried at Glen Eden Cemetery. With his wife Parskeviya, he had three sons: Eugene (who has served on the church's Consistory board twice), Yaroslaw and Emil.

Religious titles
Preceded by Archbishop Boris (Yakovkevych)	Bishop of Saskatoon (UOCC); 1978–1982	Succeeded by Bishop John (Stinka)
Preceded by Bishop Nicholas (Debryn)	Bishop of Toronto (UOCC); 1982–1985	Succeeded by Bishop Yurij (Kalistchuk)
Preceded by Metropolitan Andrew (Metiuk)	Archbishop of Winnipeg and the Central Eparchy, Metropolitan and Primate of the Ukrainian Orthodox Church of Canada (UOCC); 1985–2005	Succeeded by Metropolitan John (Stinka)
