= Saint Sophie Ukrainian Orthodox Cathedral =

St. Sophie Cathedral
- Saint Sophie Ukrainian Orthodox Cathedral
- Українська Православна Катедра Святої Софії
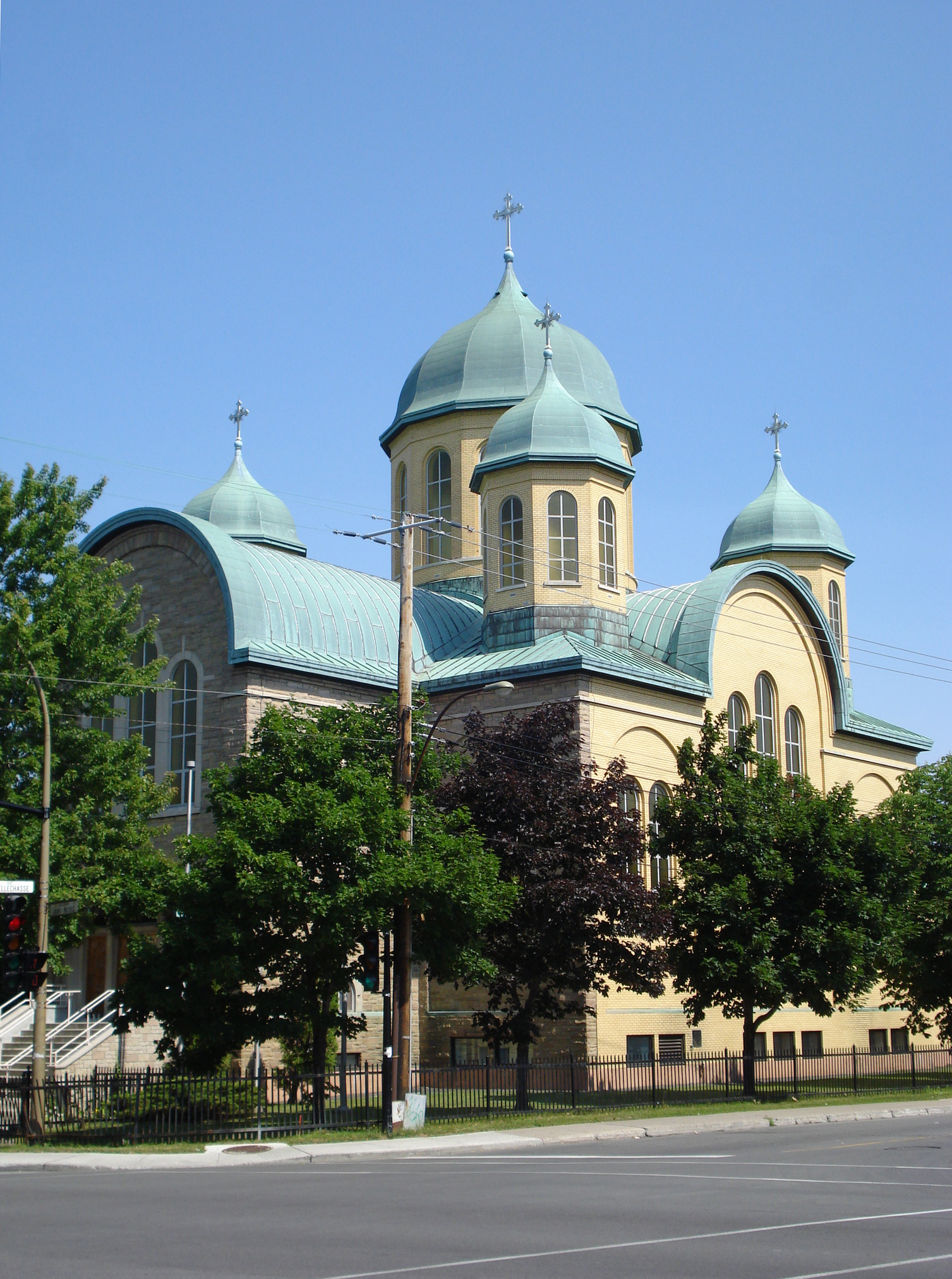

- Location within Montreal
- 45°33′13.83″N 73°34′56.56″W
- Location: 6255, boulevard Saint-Michel; Montreal, Quebec; H1Y 2E8
- Denomination: Eastern Orthodox Church
- Website: stsophiemontreal.com

History
- Founded: 1925
- Founder: Fr. Semen Sawchuk
- Dedication: Virgin Mary

Architecture
- Architect: Volodymyr Sichynsky
- Architectural type: Byzantine Revival architecture
- Groundbreaking: 1960
- Completed: 1962

Administration
- Division: Eastern Eparchy

Clergy
- Priest: Very Rev. Fr. Volodymyr Kouchnir

Saint Sophie Ukrainian Orthodox Cathedral (Ukrainian: Українська Православна Катедра Святої Софії) is a Ukrainian Orthodox cathedral in Montreal, Quebec, Canada. It is located on Saint-Michel Boulevard, corner De Bellechasse Street, in the borough of Rosemont–La Petite-Patrie.

It was designed by architect Volodymyr Sichynsky and constructed from 1960 to 1962. Its front facade is in stone, although its exterior walls are made of brick. Its roof is made of copper. In 1988, St. Sophie was elevated to the status of "cathedral."

The parish priest is the Very Reverend Father Volodymyr Kouchnir.

== Religious services ==
- Divine Liturgy (in Ukrainian) at 10:00 a.m. every Sunday and 9:30 a.m. on weekdays as prescribed by the Ukrainian Orthodox Church of Canada
- Bilingual (Ukrainian & English) service on special holidays
- Sunday School (For children ages 5 and over): Sunday at 10:00 am in the Parish Hall.
