= Kamianets-Podilskyi Ivan Ohiienko National University =

Public university in Kamianets-Podilskyi, Ukraine

Coordinates: 48°40′31.1″N 26°35′12.04″E

- Кам'янець-Подільський Національний Університет імені Івана Огієнка
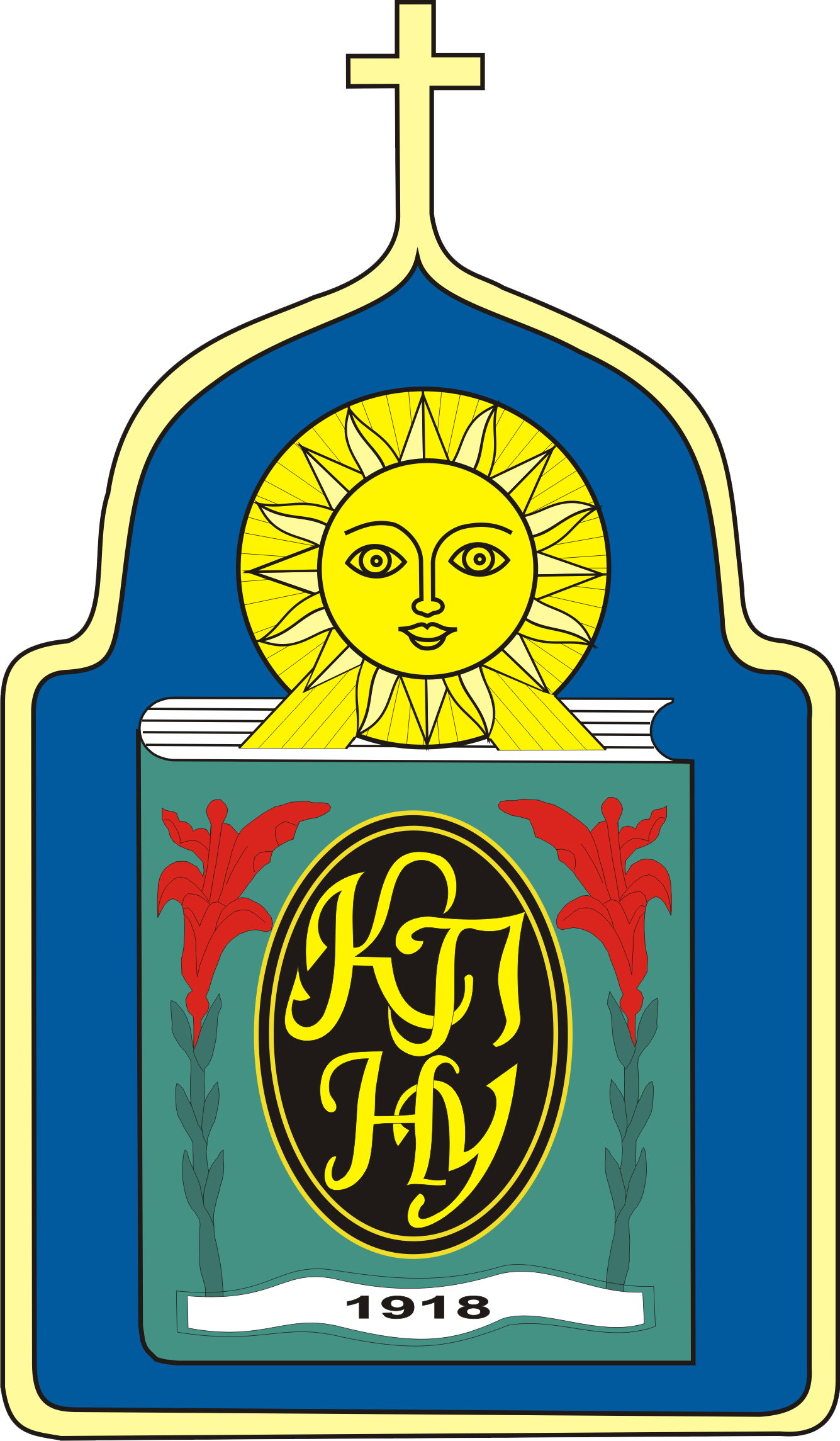
- Motto: Tamdium discendum est, quamdium vivis
- Type: Public university
- Established: 1918
- Affiliations: Ministry of Education and Science of Ukraine
- Location: Kamianets-Podilskyi, Ukraine
- Campus: 61 Ohiienko Street
- Website: kpnu.edu.ua

The Kamianets-Podilskyi Ivan Ohiienko National University (Ukrainian: Кам'янець-Подільський Національний Університет імені Івана Огієнка) is a state-sponsored university in Kamianets-Podilskyi (Ukraine).

== History ==
The university was founded as Kamianets-Podilsky State Ukrainian University on October 22, 1918, under a law signed by Pavlo Skoropadsky during his brief rule as Hetman of Ukraine. The first rector of the university was the scientist and linguist Ivan Ohiienko. The university consisted of five faculties: History and Philology; Physics and Mathematics; Law; Theology; and Agriculture.

The defeat of the Ukrainian national liberation movement in the autumn of 1920 by the bolsheviks determined the fate of the university: at first, it was reorganized into the Academy of Theoretical Knowledge, but on February 2, 1921 — into the Institute for Theoretical Sciences, which included three autonomous institutions: Physics and Mathematics, the Humanities and Agricultural Sciences. On February 26, 1921 the Institute for Theoretical Sciences was reorganized into two separate schools — the Institute of Public Education and Agricultural Institute. During the 1930s and 1940s the Institute of Public Education was reorganized three times — in 1930, when it was reorganized into the Institute of Social Education; in 1933–1934, into Pedagogical Institute; and in 1939, into the Institute of Teachers. Since the 1948–1949 academic year, according to the decision of the Council of Ministers of the USSR, the Kamianets-Podilskyi Institute of Teachers was reorganized into the Pedagogical Institute.

It was made a State Pedagogical university in 1997, a State university in 2003 and a national university named after Ivan Ohiienko in 2008.

== University activity ==
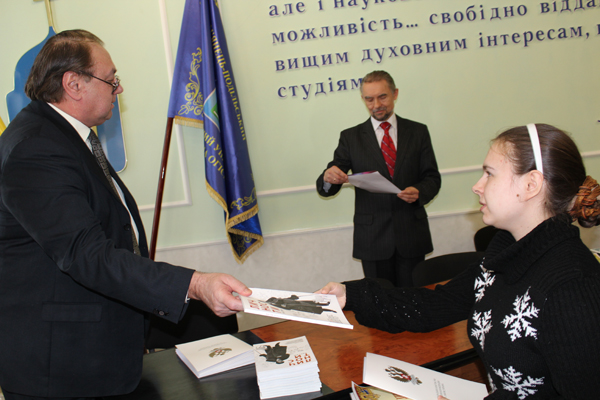

During its existence the university has trained about 55,000 professionals for education and other sectors of the national economy, more than 350 PhDs and Candidates of Science.

In sport, from 2007 to 2011 the students of the university have won 509 awards at the championships and universiades of Ukraine and 135 medals at the Olympic Games, World and European Championships.

The university has received a number of awards.

== Gallery ==
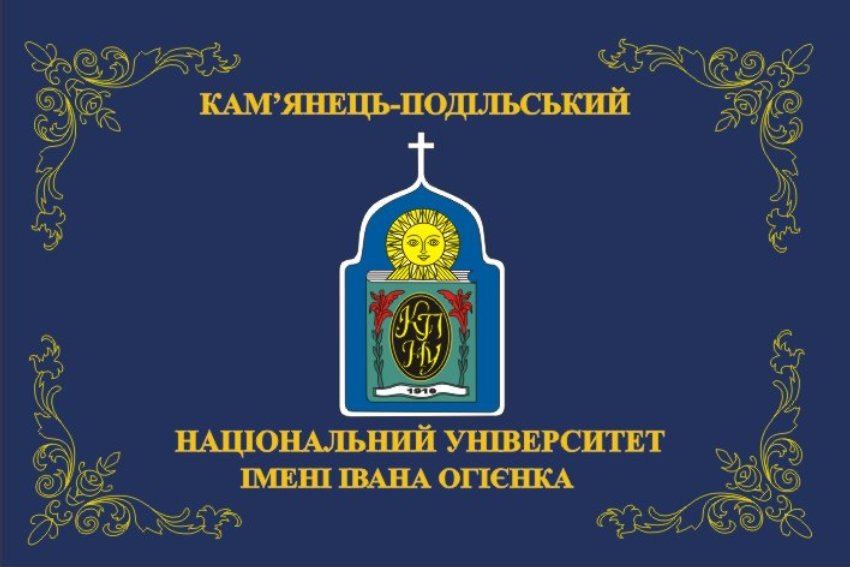

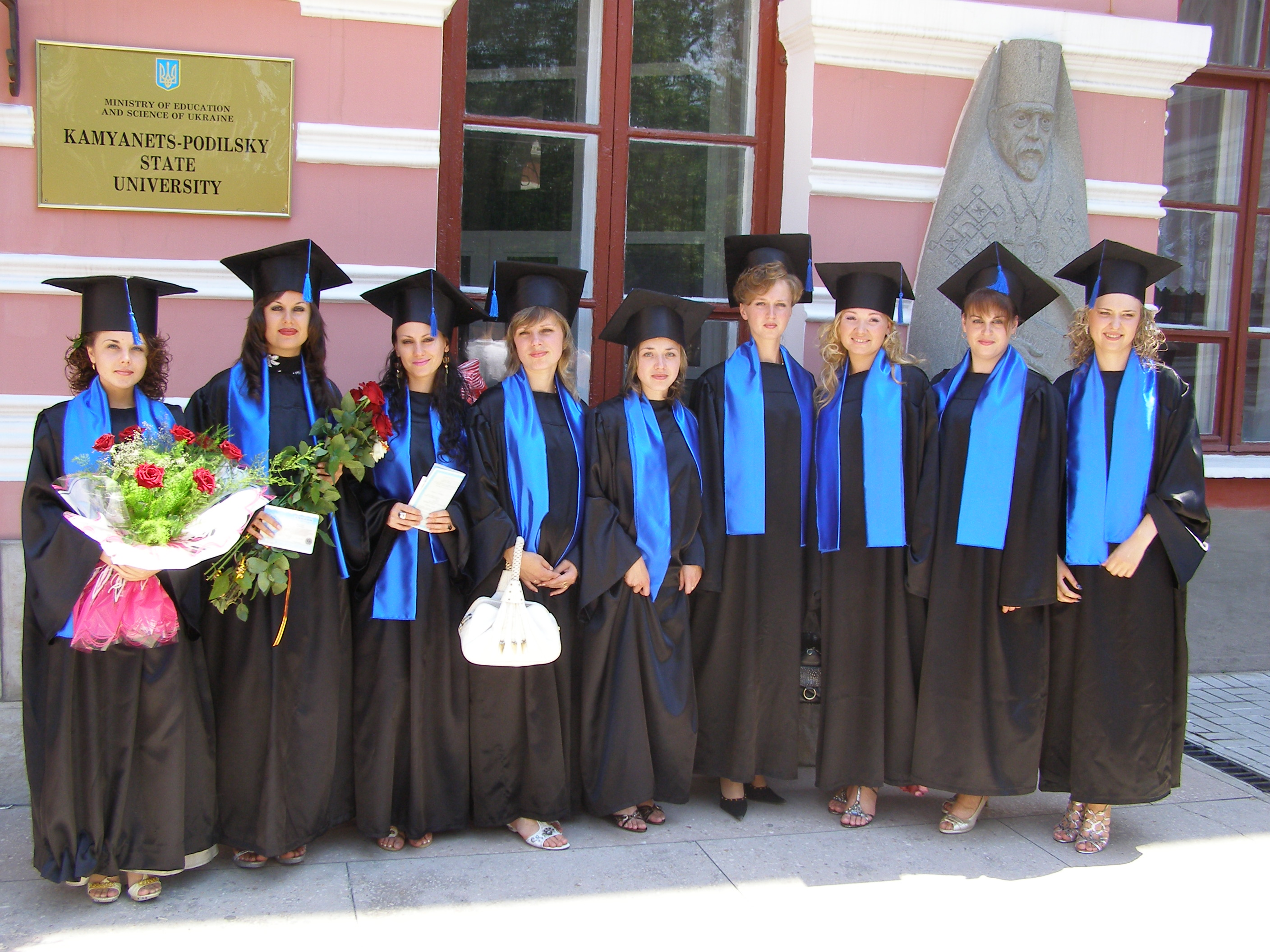

== See also ==
List of universities in Ukraine
