= John Stinka =

Head of the Ukrainian Orthodox Church of Canada

Metropolitan John (born Ivan Stinka; January 14, 1935 – September 19, 2022) was the head of the Ukrainian Orthodox Church of Canada with title John, Archbishop of Winnipeg, and of the Central Diocese, Metropolitan of Canada. He was enthroned as Metropolitan of Canada on July 23, 2006.

== Early life ==
Ivan Stinka was born in Buchanan, Saskatchewan to Nikolaj and Annie (Spizawka) Stinka; he was the youngest of twelve children. He worked as an elementary school teacher and butcher for several years while being actively involved in the Ukrainian Orthodox community.

== Priesthood ==
In the fall of 1969, John Stinka enrolled in theological studies at St. Andrew's College in Winnipeg, which he successfully completed in 1972 with a Licentiate in Theology. He continued his studies at the University of Manitoba following his Licentiate in Theology.

On August 18, 1973, he was ordained into the Holy Diaconate at Holy Trinity Cathedral in Saskatoon by Archbishop Boris (Yakovkevych), and on August 25, 1974, in Holy Tranfiguration Ukrainian Orthodox Church in Yorkton, Deacon John was ordained to the priesthood, again ordained by Archbishop Boris. Fr. John's first assignment was to Moose Jaw, Sk., and during that time convocated from the University of Saskatchewan with a Bachelor of Arts Degree. In August 1978, Fr. John was transferred to Kamsack, Sk.

Throughout his pastorship, Fr. John was active in the Ukrainian Community, and the Orthodox Community. He was awarded his nabedrennik in 1977, and his skufia in 1980.

== Episcopacy ==
At the Extraordinary Sobor of the UOCC in 1983, Fr. John was elected Bishop, and was ordained to the Episcopacy on November 27, 1983, at Holy Trinity Metropolitan Cathedral, and installed as bishop of Saskatoon by Metropolitan Andrew (Metiuk), Archbishop Boris, and Bishop Wasyly (Fedak).

At the 17th Sobor, in 1985 in Winnipeg, Bishop John was appointed Bishop of Edmonton and the Western Diocese, following the reposes of Archbishop Boris, and Metropolitan Andrew. In 1990 he was elevated to Archbishop.

Following the repose of Metropolitan Wasyly in 2005, Archbishop John became the acting Primate, and at the 21st Sobor in Winnipeg in 2006 was elected Primate, and Metropolitan (and was approved by Constantinople on November 22, 2005).

He was enthroned on Sunday, July 23, 2006, at the Holy Trinity Ukrainian Orthodox Metropolitan Cathedral. Co-presiding at the Divine Liturgy were Archbishop Yurij (Kalistchuk) of Toronto, Archbishop Antony (Sherba) of New York & Washington (UOC-USA), and Bishop Georgie of the Serbian Diocese of Canada. Metropolitan Sotirios of the Greek Metropolis of Toronto presided over the enthronement, and later presented Metropolitan John with a Panagia from the Ecumenical Patriarchate, a blue Mantiya, an episcopal staff, and a Metropolitan's white Klobuk.

He died in 2022.

Preceded by Bishop Wasyly (Fedak)	Bishop of Saskatoon (UOCC); 1983–1985	Succeeded by Bishop Yurij (Kalistchuk)
Preceded by Archbishop Boris (Yakovkevych)	Archbishop of Edmonton and Western Canada; 1985–2005	Succeeded by Hilarion (Rudnyk)
Preceded by Metropolitan Wasyly	Archbishop of Winnipeg and the Central Diocese, Metropolitan and Primate of the Ukrainian Orthodox Church of Canada (UOCC); 2005–2010	Succeeded by Metropolitan Yurij (Kalistchuk)

== Sources ==
- "Tribute and Farewell to His Eminence Metropolitan John" (Western Diocese; UOCC)
