= Ilarion Ohienko =

Ukrainian cleric and historian (1882–1972)

Ilarion (Ohienko)
- Metropolitan and Primate of the Ukrainian Greek Orthodox Church of Canada
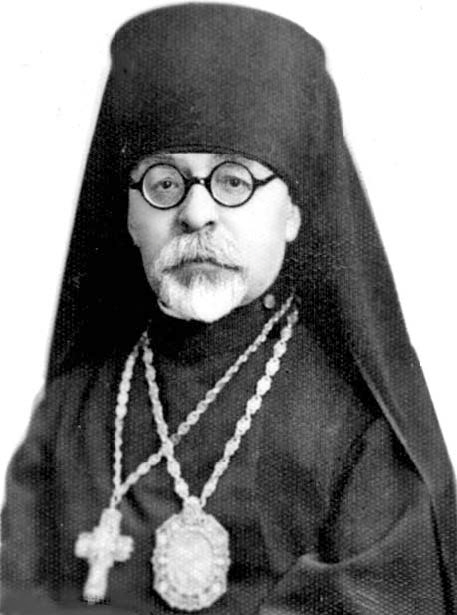
- As Bishop of Chełm and Podlachia
- Church: Ukrainian Greek Orthodox Church of Canada; Polish Orthodox Church
- Elected: 1951
- Quashed: 1972
- Predecessor: Mstyslav (Skrypnyk)
- Successor: Michael (Khoroshy)
- Other posts: Bishop of Chełm and Podlasie

Orders
- Ordination: 1940 by Dionysius (Waledyński)

Personal details
- Born: Іван Іванович Огієнко; Ivan Ivanovych Ohienko; 2 January 1882 [O.S. 21 December 1881] Brusilov, Kiev Governorate, Russian Empire
- Died: 29 March 1972 (aged 90) Winnipeg, Manitoba, Canada
- Denomination: Eastern Orthodox
- Spouse: Dominika Lytvynchukova
- Children: 4
- Occupation: cleric, historian, ethnographer, and scholar, writer, and translator
- Education: St. Vladimir Imperial University of Kiev
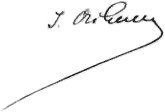
- Signature

Minister of Education of Ukraine
- In office 1919 – April 1919
- Preceded by: Petro Kholodnyi
- Succeeded by: Antin Krushelnytskyi

Metropolitan Ilarion (secular name Ivan Ivanovych Ohienko; Ukrainian: Іван Іванович Огієнко, romanized: Ohiienko; 2 January 1882 [O.S. 21 December 1881] in Brusilov, Kiev Governorate – 29 March 1972 in Winnipeg, Manitoba, Canada) was a Ukrainian Orthodox bishop, linguist, church historian, and historian of Ukrainian culture. In 1940 he was Archimandrite of the St. Onuphrius Monastery in Jabłeczna; in 1940 he became Bishop of Chełm; in 1944 he became the Metropolitan of Chełm and Lublin (Lubelskie), and in 1951 Primate of the Ukrainian Orthodox Church of Canada. He was also active in Ukrainian politics, both during the revolution and later in emigration. Throughout his long career, in addition to church work, Ohienko contributed to scholarship and other areas of Ukrainian culture.

== Biography ==
=== Early life ===
Ivan Ohienko was born in 1882 to a peasant family in Brusyliv, Kiev Governorate. He was the youngest child in the family. After the early death of his father, a cantonist soldier, Ivan could enroll at a military medical (feldsher) school in Kyiv, which he entered in 1896. In 1897 he published a newspaper article dedicated to the life in his native town of Brusyliv.

In 1900 he graduated from the Kiev military field physician school where he studied along with Russian poet Demyan Bedny. As an amateur journalist, Ohienko cooperated with the Ukrainian publications Hromadska dumka and Rada, and created a number of poems dedicated to patriotic and religious topics. Following graduation, in 1900-1903 he worked as a practicant at a medical hospital.

=== Beginning of scientific work ===
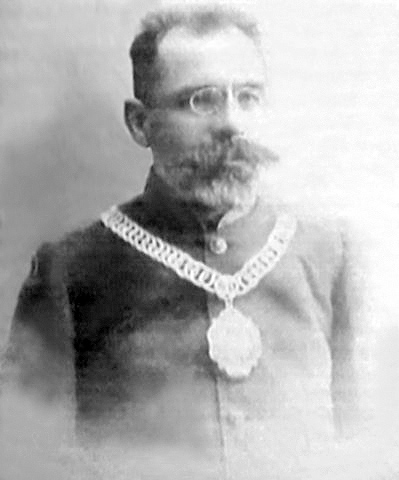
Ohienko early in his career

After leaving military service following his tests, Ohienko entered the St. Vladimir Imperial University of Kiev where he initially studied medicine, but later changed for Slavic philology under Vladimir Peretts. After leaving the university with a 1st level diploma in 1909, Ohienko presented his candidate thesis and became a professorial stipendiate. Known for his support for "Ukrainian separatism", Ohienko exchanged letters with Ivan Franko, who published some of his works at the press organ of the Shevchenko Scientific Society.

By 1916 Ohienko was teaching Slavic philology at his alma mater. During the revolution he became active in the Ukrainisation of higher education, and became one of the first professors at the establishment to deliver lectures in the Ukrainian language. He also created an own course dedicated to the history of Ukrainian language, which he presented without permission from authorities. During that period Ohienko created almost 20 schoolbooks on linguistics and supported the creation of a separate chair dedicated to the Ukrainian language, literature and history. Following the creation of the Kyiv Ukrainian State University by hetman Pavlo Skoropadsky, Ohienko served as one its professors. He later transferred to the newly founded Kamianets-Podilskyi University, becoming its first rector.

=== Political career ===
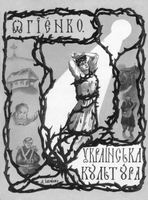
"Ukrainska kultura" published in 1918 by Ohienko

Ohienko was a member of the Ukrainian Party of Socialists-Federalists headed by Serhiy Yefremov. His brochure Ukrainian Culture, published in 1917, met criticism of scientists, among them philologist Volodymyr Naumenko, for its panegyric tone and lack of proof material. However, the work brought the attention of Ukrainian leader Symon Petliura, and education minister Ivan Steshenko soon tasked Ohienko with creating a short set of Ukrainian language rules to be employed in schools. In January 1919 Ohienko succeeded Steshenko as the minister of education of the Ukrainian People's Republic. After the introduction of Ukrainian as the official language by the Directorate, Ohienko headed a commission on a new orthography law. On his post Ohienko laid the foundation for the creation of the future National Museum and directed the signing ceremony of the Unification Act at Sofiiska Square on 22 January 1919.

After the government's relocation to Vinnytsia, Ohienko continued to be active in the Ukrainization efforts. After serving for some time as the government representative in Kamianets-Podilskyi, he emigrated, but remained a member of the Ukrainian government, serving as minister of Religious Affairs. In December 1919 Ohienko refused to sign the Warsaw Declaration, according to which Ukraine ceded its western lands to Poland. In September 1922 he finally broke relations with Ukrainian authorities.

=== Turn to religion ===
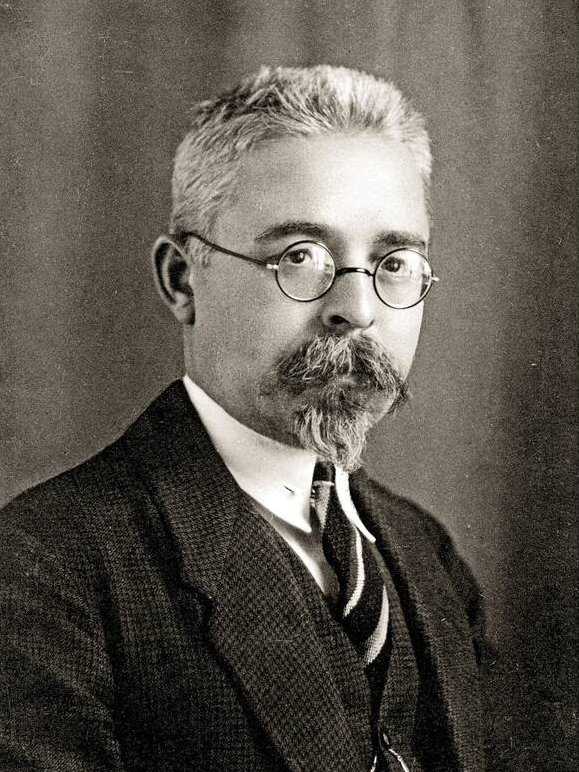
Ohienko during his professorship at Warsaw University, 1926

During the All-Ukrainian Church Council in 1918, Ohienko called for the creation of an autocephalous Ukrainian church. Between September 1919 and September 1922, while in exile in Tarnów, he headed Ukraine's Ministry of Religious Affairs. During his tenure Ukrainian was introduced as a language of liturgy, linguistic courses for priests were founded, and a publishing house dedicated to the Ukrainian church appeared. In 1922 Ohienko published a Ukrainian translation of the liturgy of John Chrysostom in Lviv.

In 1922, with the support of metropolitan Andrey Sheptytsky, Ohienko was appointed as a lecturer at the Lviv Teachers' Seminary. However, in 1926 he was forced to leave the post due to the opposition of Polish and Moscophile circles. Until 1932, Ohienko taught at the Faculty of Orthodox Theology at Warsaw University, becoming its first Ukrainian lecturer. However, he was once again dismissed under political pressure from Polish nationalist elements due to his opposition to Polonization.

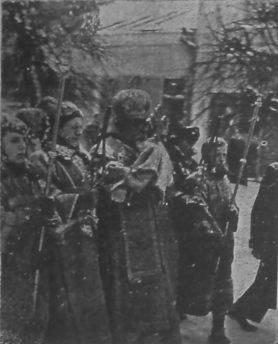
Ohienko presiding over a religious service in Kholm (Chełm), 1941

=== Church activities ===
On 9 October 1940 Ohienko accepted a tonsure of monk in Jabłeczna Orthodox monastery by Metropolitan Dionysius (Waledyński), taking the name Ilarion, in honour of Hilarion of Kiev.

On 20 October 1940 at the Chełm (Kholm) assembly of Ukrainian Orthodox Bishops on Daniel Hill Ilarion (Ohienko) was ordained as Bishop of Kholm and Podlachia. His cheirotonia was carried by Metropolitan Dionysius (Waledyński), Archbishop of Prague Savvatij (Vrabec) and Bishop of Lublin Timothy (Szretter).

On 16 March 1944 Ilarion acquired the title of Metropolitan bishop of Kholm and Podlachia.

During his tenure, Ilarion opposed the persecution of ethnic Ukrainians in the regions of Kholm and Podlachia. In this he was supported by metropolitan Andrey Sheptytsky.

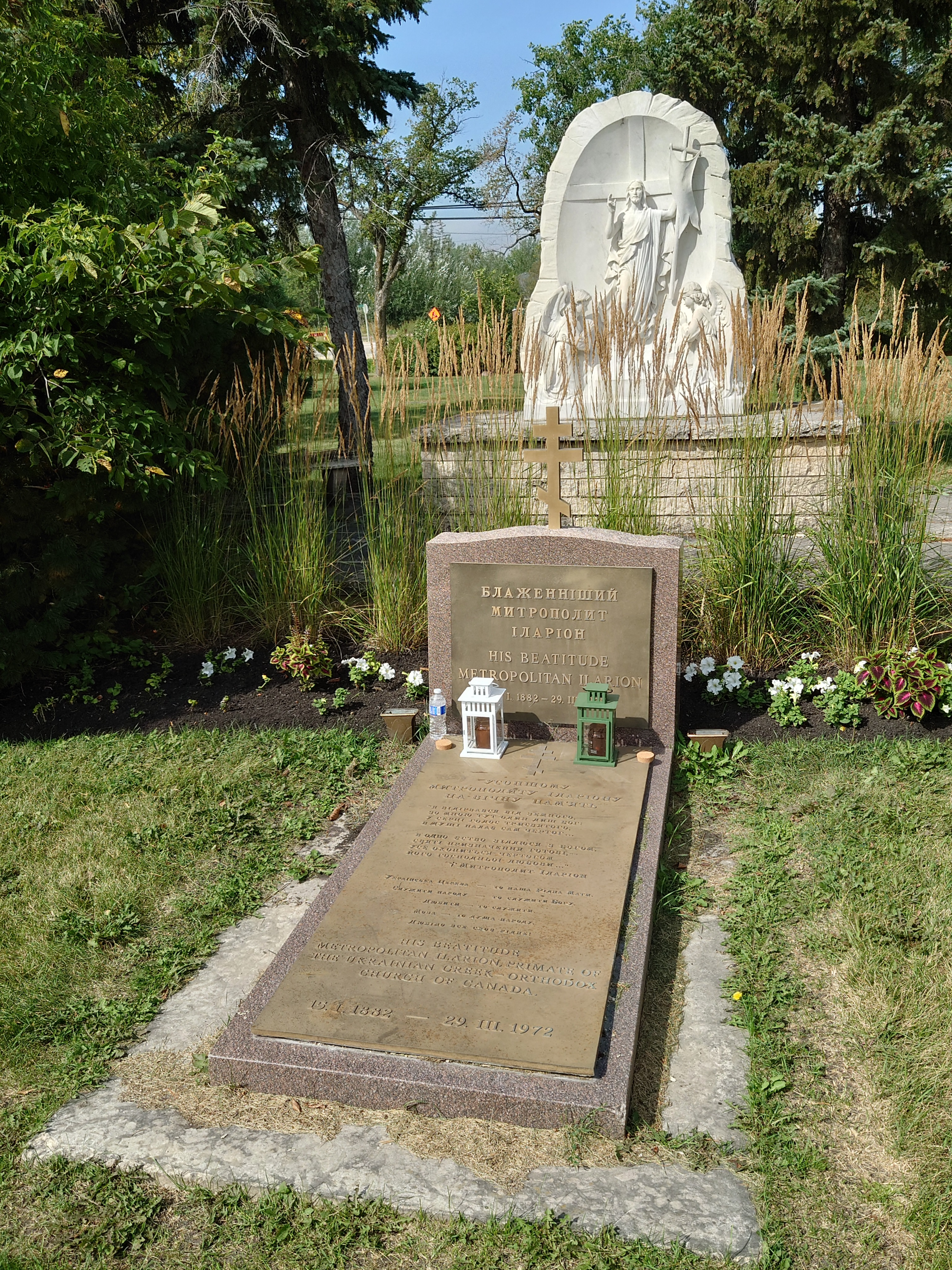
Grave of Metropolitan Ilarion outside of Winnipeg

In face of the advance of the Red Army, Ilarion fled west, initially settling in Lausanne, Switzerland. In 1947 he settled in Winnipeg in Western Canada. Until 1951 he organized the publishing of the magazine Word of Truth (Ukrainian: Слово Істини). Ilarion also became as a dean of the Theological Faculty at St. Andrew's College, Manitoba. From 1951 and until his death in 1972 Ilarion served as the Metropolitan bishop of the Ukrainian Orthodox Church of Canada.

In April 1960 he presided over the act of union between the Greek Orthodox in Canada, Ukrainian Autocephalous Orthodox Church in diaspora and the Orthodox Church in the USA. However, this act was viewed with skepticism by the predominantly Catholic part of the Ukrainian diaspora. Ilarion's policies also suffered due to subversive actions by the Soviet-controlled Russian Orthodox Church and because of his conflict with bishop Mstyslav Skrypnyk, who also resided in Canada.

== Scholarly work ==
As a scholar, Ohienko made contributions to Ukrainian linguistics, church history, and the history of Ukrainian culture. He published books on the history of Ukrainian linguistics (1907), the history of Ukrainian printing (1925), the pre-Christian beliefs of the Ukrainian people (1965), the history of the Ukrainian literary language (1950), and several studies in Ukrainian church history of the Cossack era. He also published a general history of the Ukrainian Church (1942), a two volume work on Saints Cyril and Methodius (1927–28), edited several semi-scholarly journals, and compiled a multi-volume etymological-semantic dictionary of the Ukrainian language which was only published after his death. Following his resignation from Warsaw university, Ohienko created two magazines dedicated to the Ukrainian language and culture. After the Second World War Ohienko returned to publishing activities, acting as a popularizer or knowledge. Among his later works published during the 1960s are texts dedicated to the historical figures of Prince Volodymyr and Paisius Velichkovsky. Most of the works first published in Poland were reprinted in Winnipeg during the Cold War, and then, again, in Ukraine after the re-establishment of independence in 1991.

- The Divine Liturgy of our Holy Father John Chrysostom, in the Ukrainian language — Part I, Text: Proskomidia, Divine Liturgy, Prayers following Holy Communion. (L'viv, 1922);
- The Divine Liturgy of our Holy Father John Chrysostom, in the Ukrainian language — Part II, Explanation of the Text, Translation Methodology of Divine service books into Ukrainian, Explanatory notes on the translation of the Liturgy of St. John Chrysostom, Alphabetical list of corresponding Church Slavonic words, List of publications of the Non-profit Publishing House Ukrainian Autocephalous Church under the direction of Prof. Ivan Ohienko. (L'viv, 1922);
- Holy Vespers. (L'viv, 1922);
- Compline and Midnight Service. (L'viv, 1922);
- Holy Matins Service. (L'viv, 1922);
- Little Vespers, Holy All-night Vigil, Saturday Midnight Service, Sunday Midnight Service. (L'viv, 1922);
- First Hour, Third Hour, Sixth Hour, Ninth Hour. (L'viv, 1922);
- Great Compline. (L'viv, 1922);
- Daily Dismissals, Dismissals at Feasts of the Lord, Troparia and Kondakia at Feasts throughout the year, Festal Prokeimena at Orthros Services. (L'viv, 1922);
- Matins Gospels. (L'viv, 1922);
- Prayer of Thanksgiving of St. Ambrose, Bishop of Mediolanum, Nationalisation of theological texts, Afterword, Table of Contents, Errata. (L'viv, 1922);
- Byzantium and Ukraine (1954);

== Ohienko Bible ==
Between 1920 and 1940, Ohienko completed a translation of the Bible into the Ukrainian language, finally published in 1958. The translation was made according to a contract signed between Ohienko and the British Bible Society in 1936. His translation of the Gospels became available in 1937, and the rest of the New Testament and the Psalms in 1939. In 1949 parts of Ohienko's manuscripts and printed texts were located in Austria and transported to Canada by the British Army personnel. The full text of Ohienko's translation of the Bible was printed in 1962 in London. It remains one most widely used nowadays, with the Ukrainian Bible Society starting to publish mass editions in 1995. Before that, his translation was mainly being published in the US, Canada, and Western Europe.

== Political views ==
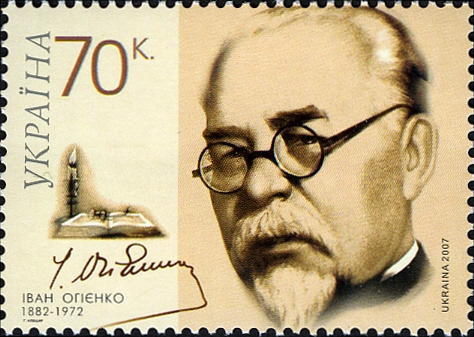
Ohienko on a 2007 stamp of Ukraine

A political moderate, during the revolution, Ohienko was a member of the Ukrainian Party of Socialists-Federalists. He was a populist committed to bringing the church closer to the common people, spreading the achievements of scholarship among wider circles of the public, and narrowing the gap between the literary language and the vernacular. Always firmly committed to Eastern Orthodoxy, some of his works betray a polemical anti-Catholic tone, but he never acceded to the ecclesiastical or political claims of Moscow (see Moscow Patriarchy) and to his death in 1972 remained a strong supporter of Ukrainian church autocephaly and Ukrainian political independence.

== Personal life ==
Ohienko's wife Dominika Danylivna Lytvynchuk (Lytvynchukova) was a fellow native of Brusyliv, who graduated from a midwives' school in Kyiv. The couple married in November 1907. Their first child Yevhen was born in 1908, but died two years later. Ohienko's second son Anatol, born in 1910, worked as an engineer and emigrated to Argentina after the Second World War. The younger son Yuriy (born 1911) became a gas engineer, and daughter Oleksandra-Lesia (born 1921) worked as a librarian. Dominika worked as Ohienko's secretary and died in 1937, leaving him a widower. Following Ohienko's emigration, both of his youger children also settled in Canada, and after his death they opposed their father's reburial in Ukraine.

Preceded by Archbishop Mstyslav (Skrypnyk) as Archbishop of Winnipeg	Metropolitan of Winnipeg and the Central Diocese, Metropolitan and Primate of the Ukrainian Greek Orthodox Church of Canada (UOCC); 1951–1972	Succeeded by Metropolitan Michael (Khoroshy)
Preceded by Petro Kholodny	Minister of Education of Ukraine; 1919 – April 1919	Succeeded by Antin Krushelnytskyi
