= Kadubivtsi =

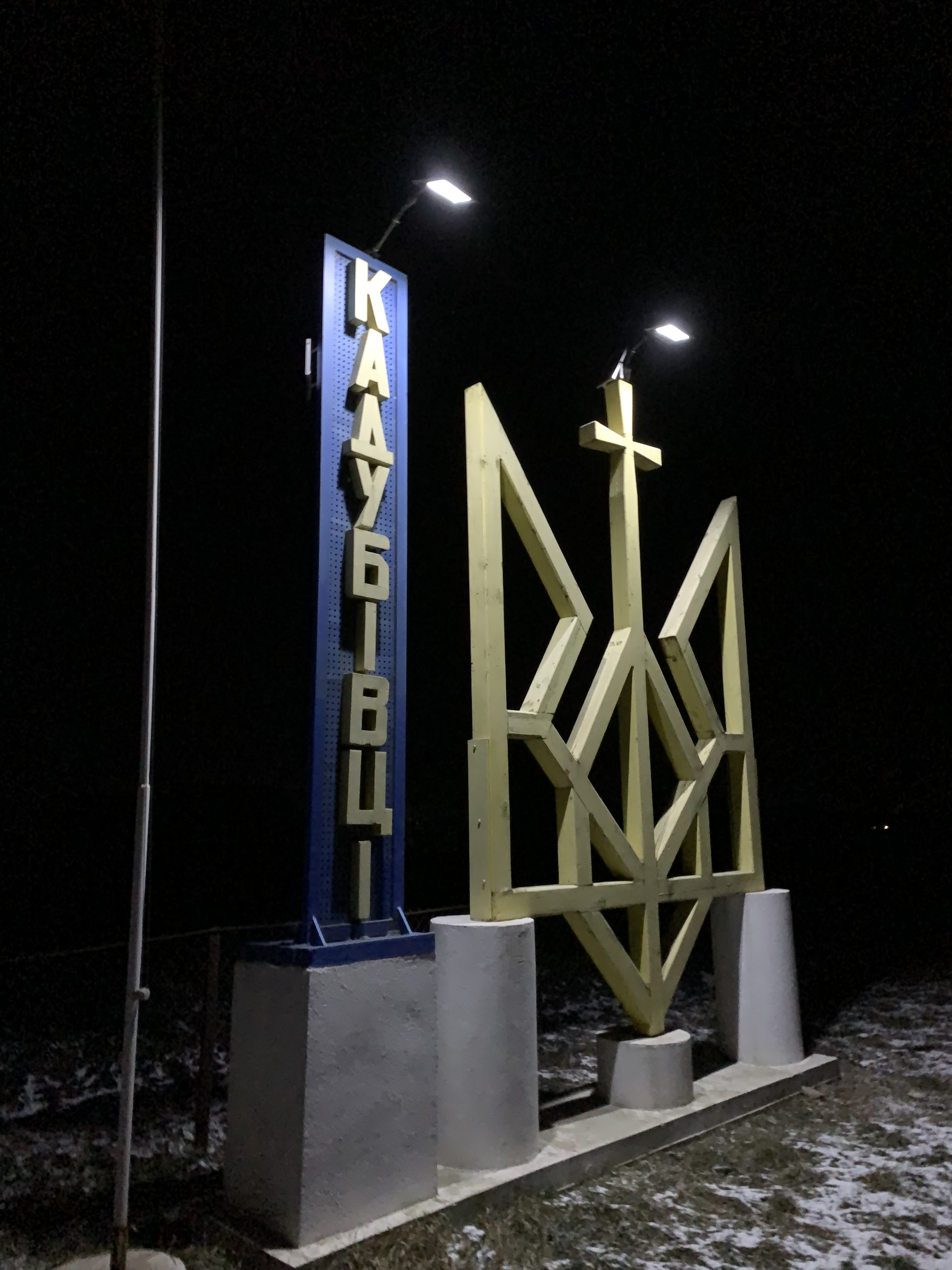

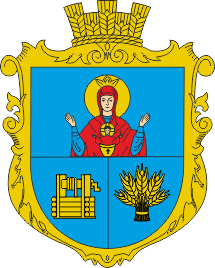
- Coat of arms
- Interactive map of Kadubivtsi
- Country: Ukraine
- Oblast: Chernivtsi Oblast
- Raion: Chernivtsi Raion
- Hromada: Kadubivtsi rural hromada
- First written mention: 1589
- Elevation: 257 m (843 ft)

Population
  - Total: 3,169
- Postal code: 59421

Kadubivtsi (Ukrainian: Кадубівці; Romanian: Cadobești; German: Kadobestie) is a village in Chernivtsi Raion, Chernivtsi Oblast, Ukraine. It hosts the administration of Kadubivtsi rural hromada, one of the hromadas of Ukraine.

Until 18 July 2020, Kadubivtsi belonged to Zastavna Raion. The raion was abolished in July 2020 as part of the administrative reform of Ukraine, which reduced the number of raions of Chernivtsi Oblast to three. The area of Zastavna Raion was merged into Chernivtsi Raion.
