= Ukrainian Orthodox Eparchy of Eastern Canada =

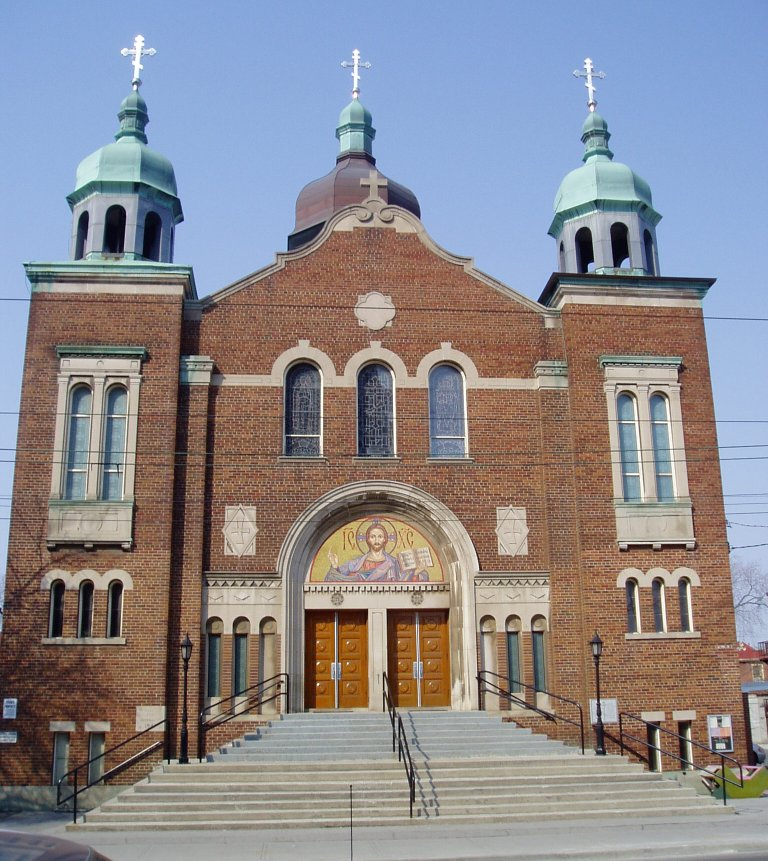
St. Volodymyr's Ukrainian Orthodox Cathedral

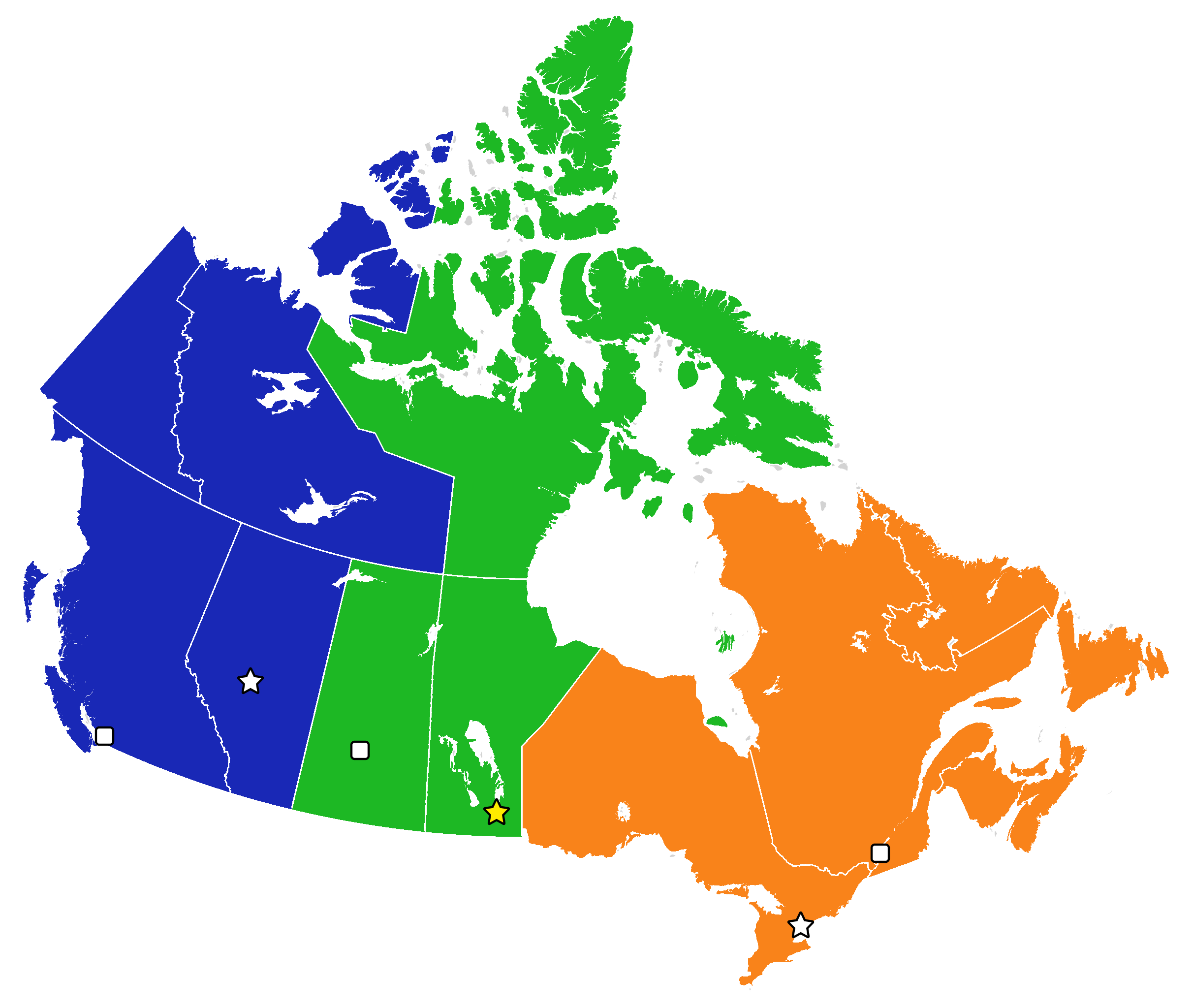
The Eastern eparchy is marked in orange

The Eastern Eparchy of the Ukrainian Orthodox Church of Canada is an autonomous part of the Church of Constantinople. The UOCC's Eastern Eparchy consists of the Canadian provinces of Ontario and Quebec, and consists of 27 parish cathedrals and churches.

The eparchy has 17 parishes. It is based in Ontario.

In 2023, the Bishop is Andrew Peshko. Previous to his appointment, Metropolitan Yurij (Kalistchuk) of Winnipeg served as the diocese's locum tenens. Prior to his election as primate of the UOCC in 2010 Metropolitan Yurij served as Archbishop of Toronto and the Eastern Eparchy.

== Cathedrals ==
- St. Volodymyr's Ukrainian Orthodox Cathedral (Toronto)
- St. Sophie's Ukrainian Orthodox Cathedral (Montreal)

== See also ==
- Ukrainian Orthodox Eparchy of Western Canada
- Ukrainian Orthodox Church of Canada
