= Michael Khoroshy =

Bishop of the Ukrainian Orthodox Church of Canada

Metropolitan Michael, (secular name Theodot Nykyforovych Khoroshy; 10 July 1885, in Fyodorovka, near Oleksandria, Russian Empire (now in Ukraine) – May 5, 1977, in Toronto) was a bishop of the Ukrainian Orthodox Church of Canada from 1951 to 1977, and the Church's Metropolitan from 1973 until his resignation in 1975.

== Ukraine ==
Theodot Khoroshy began his early education in his village. Later he moved on to the pedagogical seminary in the town of Shamovka in the Kherson region of Ukraine. Following that, he studied at the Theological Seminary and the Faculty of History-Philology of St. Vladimir's Seminary in Kiev.

In December 1912, Bishop Nicodemus ordained young Theodot a deacon.

During the next few years, he translated the Liturgical Psalter into Ukrainian.

On April 24, 1920, Bishop Dimitrius (Verbitsky) ordained him a priest, and in the following months he was appointed dean of a church in Ternivka, in the Cherkasy region.

After the formation of the non-canonical Ukrainian Autocephalous Orthodox Church joined its ranks.

Due to his clerical work, in 1923 Fr. Theodot was appointed the dean of the Cathedral of Cherkasy.

At this time the Bolshevik occupation, clergy were pressured to deny their vocation, Fr. Theodot was a great soldier of Christ, and was unshaken. The communist authorities arrested Fr. Theodot in September 1929, after which he was condemned to eight years in concentration camps in the far north: first on the Kola peninsula on the White Sea, then the "Island of Death": Kond, and a year later to Solovky. In the fall of 1932 he was transferred to the camps of Ukhta-Pechersk for further punishment. Following his release in 1937, Fr. Theodot returned to the Donbas area in Ukraine and established himself in Kirovograd.

== Episcopacy ==
German Nazi occupation of Ukraine in 1941 bring relative religious freedom. In Kirovohrad, Fr. Theodot organized a Higher Church Government, and in March 1942 he was elected a candidate for the Episcopate. With the blessing of the Administrator of the Warsaw Metropolia in the freed Ukrainian lands, headed by Archbishop Polikarp (Sikorsky), Bishops Nikanor and Ihor, tonsured Fr. Theodot a monk on May 12, 1942. He was given the name Michael and ordained into the episcopate as the Bishop of Kirovohrad at St. Andrew's Cathedral in Kiev.

In November 1942 Bishop Michael was elevated to archbishop of the Kirovohrad Diocese. Archbishop Michael was transferred to the Mykolayiv Diocese due to pressure from German authorities. By the conclusion of the war in 1945, Archbishop Michael had travelled widely across Europe: to Odessa, Akerman, Galac, Vienna, Warsaw, and throughout Germany and Slovakia. He was allowed to continue his pastoral work for the Ukrainian Orthodox, particularly amongst captives, expatriated workers, and refugees. With the blessing of Metropolitan Polikarp, Archbishop Michael was given the responsibility to look after the Ukrainian Orthodox flock in Bavaria, with its headquarters in Munich.

== The Ukrainian Orthodox Church of Canada ==
Within a few years, with Metropolitan Polikarp's blessing, the Consistory of the Ukrainian Orthodox Church of Canada invited Archbishop Michael to become her ruling bishop. On May 14, 1951, Archbishop Michael came to Winnipeg, Manitoba, Canada (the Church's headquarters). However, with the arrival of Metropolitan Ilarion (Ohienko) also in 1951, the UOCC decided to use the higher-ranking bishop (Ilarion) as "Metropolitan of Winnipeg and the Central Diocese, Metropolitan of all Canada, and Primate of the Ukrainian Orthodox Church of Canada." Archbishop Michael was instead assigned as "Archbishop of Toronto and the Eastern Diocese." Archbishop Michael was the first bishop of Toronto. Under his guidance, nineteen new churches were constructed.

In 1970, Metropolitan Ilarion had become ill, and Archbishop Michael became "acting primate" of the UOCC. When Metropolitan Ilarion reposed in March 1972, Archbishop Michael was elected Primate of the Church and was installed as Metropolitan in 1973. However, during the XV Sobor in 1975, Michael resigned as metropolitan, stating that he wished to remain as the head of the Eastern Diocese.

Metropolitan Michael died on May 5, 1977, in Toronto, at the age of 91. He was buried in the Prospect Cemetery in Toronto.

Metropolitan Michael always had a keen concern for the spiritual education of his faithful and especially of the children. He wrote theological works, translated the Psalter, the Horologion (the Book of Hours), and a number of other works into Ukrainian. He also composed music for the services of vespers, matins, and the Divine Liturgy. He was a confessor of the Orthodox Faith and a zealous archpastor. Metropolitan Andrew (Metiuk) said at his graveside: "He was a great intercessor before our Lord God, and for his people and his Church."

== Sources ==
- 1997 Rydna Nyva-UOCC Church Calendar

Preceded by First Bishop of Toronto; New Title	Bishop of Toronto (UOCC); 1951-1972; 1975-1977	Succeeded by Nicholas (Debryn)
Preceded by Hilarion (Ohienko)	Metropolitan of Winnipeg and the Central Diocese, Metropolitan and Primate of the Ukrainian Greek Orthodox Church of Canada (UOCC); 1972-1975	Succeeded by Andrew (Metiuk)
