= Ukrainian Orthodox Church of Canada =

- Abbreviation: UOCC
- Classification: Eastern Orthodox
- Orientation: Greek Orthodoxy
- Polity: Episcopal
- Primate: Metropolitan Ilarion (Rudnyk)
- Parishes: 241
- Language: English, Ukrainian
- Liturgy: Byzantine Rite
- Headquarters: Winnipeg, Manitoba, Canada
- Territory: Canada
- Origin: 1918; Saskatoon, Saskatchewan, Canada
- Members: 85,725
- Official website: Official website

The Ukrainian Orthodox Church of Canada (UOCC; French: Église orthodoxe ukrainienne du Canada; Greek: Ουκρανική Ορθόδοξη Εκκλησία του Καναδά; Ukrainian: Українська православна церква Канади, romanized: Ukrainska pravoslavna tserkva Kanady) is an Eastern Orthodox church in Canada, primarily consisting of Orthodox Ukrainian Canadians. Its former name (before 1990) was the Ukrainian Greek Orthodox Church of Canada (UGOCC). The church, currently a metropolis of the Ecumenical Patriarchate of Constantinople, is part of the wider Eastern Orthodox communion, however was created independently in 1918.

It has cathedrals in many Canadian cities, including Winnipeg, Saskatoon, Vancouver, Edmonton, Toronto, and Montreal. The Metropolitan Cathedral, seminary (St. Andrew's College), and central administrative office are all based in Winnipeg. Also the church is affiliated with four residences for university students: St. Volodymyr Institute in Toronto, Ontario; St. Petro Mohyla Institute in Saskatoon, Saskatchewan; St. John's Institute in Edmonton, Alberta (closed in 2020); and one operating at St. Andrew's College. The church's membership is about ten thousand. The current primate of the church is Metropolitan Ilarion (Rudnyk).

== History ==
Most of the ethnic Ukrainians moving to Canada from Galicia and Lodomeria (Austria-Hungary) in the late nineteenth and early twentieth centuries were Greek Catholics (Ukrainian Greek Catholic Church), and were tended early on by the local Roman Catholic hierarchy until the creation of the Ukrainian Greek Catholic Exarchate in 1912. This was because the North American Roman Catholic bishops believed that the presence of married Eastern Catholic priests would create a scandal at the time. The other major group of Ukrainians which were coming to Canada were from Bukovina, and they were mostly Orthodox belonging to the Metropolitan of Bukovina and Dalmatia (autonomous church in Austria-Hungary). At first these Orthodox Christians were served by the Russian Orthodox Mission in North America (which at that time was part of the bigger Russian Orthodox Church), but these services were not conducted in their native Ukrainian language.

Catholics and the Orthodox who wanted to establish their own church met in the summer of 1918 in the city of Saskatoon, Saskatchewan, and established the Ukrainian Greek Orthodox Church in Canada. Also at these meetings, the delegates (mostly from Alberta, Saskatchewan and Manitoba) had established a Brotherhood to try to help the young church.

The settlers had just created a new church, but they were very conscious of Eastern Orthodox canon law that states that a church cannot exist without a bishop. The church's brotherhood tried to have Archbishop Alexander Nemolovsky of the Russian Orthodox Mission to take the church under his temporary care as bishop. At first Archbishop Alexander agreed, but later declined; however, the UGOC's first sobor (church assembly) still took place as planned on December 28, 1918 in Saskatoon. This sobor led to the establishment of the church's first seminary in Saskatoon. The brotherhood still searched for a temporary bishop, and eventually found one: Metropolitan Germanos (Shehadi), who was the Metropolitan of the Antiochian Orthodox Christian Archdiocese of North America. He led the church for the next 5 years (1919-1924). Under his supervision, second sobor took place in Saskatoon on November 27, 1919.

=== Archbishop John (Theodorovich) ===
Following Metropolitan Germanos' leadership, Archbishop John (Theodorovich) became the church's primate. Archbishop John had just arrived in the United States from Ukraine (Ukrainian People's Republic) where was revived the Ukrainian Autocephalous Orthodox Church for the first time since the partitions of Poland. The revived church in Ukraine was recognized as "non-canonical". Nonetheless, Archbishop John (Theodorovich) began to serve the Ukrainian Orthodox Church of the USA to become their primate and metropolitan. The young church had chosen the Ukrainian bishop as their bishop, hoping that the church would further grow under his leadership. During the summers from 1924 to 1946 Archbishop John would make an annual trip to Canada to visit the parishes throughout the country. When Archbishop John was in the USA during the winter months, a Fr. Semen Sawchuk would act as an administrator at the Consistory in Canada.

After a few years as acting primate of the UOCC, certain controversies laid around Archbishop John, due to his uncanonical ordination to bishop. Archbishop John was "ordained" by the "bishops" of Ukrainian Autocephalous Orthodox Church, who were not ordained according to the canon laws and traditions of the Eastern Orthodox Church, but were ordained by assemblies of priests and lay people and thus breaching the concept of apostolic succession in Orthodoxy; this position was held in the Alexandrian habitude, however. In an argument, the ordination of bishops of the revived Ukrainian church of 1921 was decided to carry out by a church assembly (sobor), which is similar to congregational churches. As a result of this, Archbishop John resigned his position as ruling bishop in 1946.

At a special sobor in 1947, Bishop Mstyslav (Skrypnyk) was accepted as the new Archbishop of Winnipeg and all Canada. However, due to some misunderstandings, and arguments about how the church should be governed (mostly between himself and Semen Sawchuk), he resigned as primate in 1950 at the sobor in Winnipeg, Manitoba. In response the UOCC contacted Metropolitan Polycarp (Sikorski) (who was the head of the Ukrainian Autocephalous Orthodox Church Abroad, composed of refugee bishops formerly affiliated with the Polish Orthodox Church in German-occupied Ukraine) for assistance, and he agreed to send some bishops over to help the faithful in Canada.

=== Formation of the Metropolia ===
At a special sobor in 1947 the UGOCC accepted Bishop Mstyslav (Skrypnyk) of Pereyaslav of the UAOC, consecrated during World War II with the blessing of Metropolitan Dionysius (Waledyński) of Warsaw, as its ruling bishop with the title "Archbishop of Winnipeg and All Canada". Due to conflicts between Archbishop Mstyslav and members of the UGOCC consistory, however, the former resigned as diocesan bishop at the tenth sobor of the church in 1950, once again leaving the UGOCC without a bishop.

After the resignation of Archbishop Mstyslav the consistory appealed to Metropolitan Polycarp of the UAOC for assistance in finding bishops for the UGOCC. By the time another special sobor was called in 1951 four potential bishops, all consecrated in German-occupied Ukraine during World War II, had been found. One, Metropolitan Hilarion (Ohienko) of Kholm, had been resident in Winnipeg since 1947. Two others, Archbishop Michael (Khoroshy) and Bishop Platon (Artemiuk), came to Canada at the invitation of the consistory and with the blessing of Metropolitan Polycarp.

At the 1951 sobor it was decided that the UGOCC, which had grown to include some 300 parishes, would be organized as a metropolia. Metropolitan Ilarion was elected Metropolitan of Winnipeg and All Canada and primate of the UGOCC, while Archbishop Michael was elected Archbishop of Toronto and Eastern Canada. (Bishop Platon had died shortly after his arrival in Canada.) The size of the UGOCC necessitated the appointment of more bishops, and so in 1959 Archimandrite Andrew (Metiuk) was elected Bishop of Edmonton and Western Canada and in 1963 Archimandrite Boris (Yakovkevych) was elected bishop of Saskatoon and auxiliary or assistant bishop of the Central Eparchy under Metropolitan Ilarion.

After 21 years as primate of the UGOCC, Metropolitan Ilarion died on March 29, 1972, and was succeeded by Archbishop Michael of Toronto as Metropolitan of Winnipeg and All Canada. After Metropolitan Michael's retirement in 1975 Archbishop Andrew (Metiuk) was elected metropolitan, serving until his death on February 2, 1985. Under Metropolitan Andrew new bishops, Bishops Mikolaj (Debryn), Basil (Fedak), and John (Stinka), were elected to serve the UGOCC, and after Metropolitan Andrew's death Bishop Wasyly was elected Metropolitan of Winnipeg and All Canada. Four years after his enthronement as primate of the UGOCC Metropolitan Wasyly consecrated Archimandrite Yurij (Kalistchuk) as Bishop of Saskatoon.

Since 1960 the UOCC has been in spiritual union with the Ukrainian Orthodox Church of the USA and the Ukrainian Autocephalous Orthodox Church in Diaspora.

=== Recent history ===
After dialoguing with the Church of Constantinople the UGOCC was received into its jurisdiction as the Ukrainian Orthodox Church of Canada in 1990, bringing it into the full communion of the canonical Orthodox Church. (Several years later its sister church, the Ukrainian Orthodox Church of the Diaspora, also joined the Patriarchate of Constantinople.) The decree of Ecumenical Patriarch Demetrius (Papadopoulos) uniting the UOCC with the Church of Constantinople recognized the church's internal autonomy under its metropolitan, justifying the reception of the UOCC into the Patriarchate's jurisdiction on the basis of the historic jurisdiction of the Church of Constantinople in Ukraine.

Following the death of Metropolitan Wasyly in early 2005 the twenty-first sobor of the UOCC elected Archbishop John as Metropolitan of Winnipeg and Canada. In August 2008 an extraordinary sobor was held in Saskatoon to elect new bishops, amend the UOCC's bylaws, and mark the 90th anniversary of the founding of the UOCC in the city. The sobor elected Bishops Ilarion (Rudnyk) of Telmessos as Bishop of Edmonton and Andriy (Peshko) of Krateia as auxiliary Bishop of Saskatoon.

In July 2010 another special sobor of the UOCC was held to nominate a successor to the newly retired Metropolitan John. The sobor nominated Archbishop Yurij (Kalistchuk) of Toronto for the metropolitanate, and consequently on August 30, 2010, the Holy Synod in Constantinople elected Archbishop Yurij as Archbishop of Winnipeg and Metropolitan of Canada.

In April 2022, just after the start of the Ukraine invasion, an agreement was formalized whereby the UOCC could send aid to Ukraine via the Orthodox Church of Ukraine directly.

After a year of deliberation, the UOCC began the use of the revised Julian calendar on 20 December 2023, following the same decision recently made by the Orthodox Church of Ukraine and now matching the Ecumenical Patriarchate of Constantinople.

== Structure ==
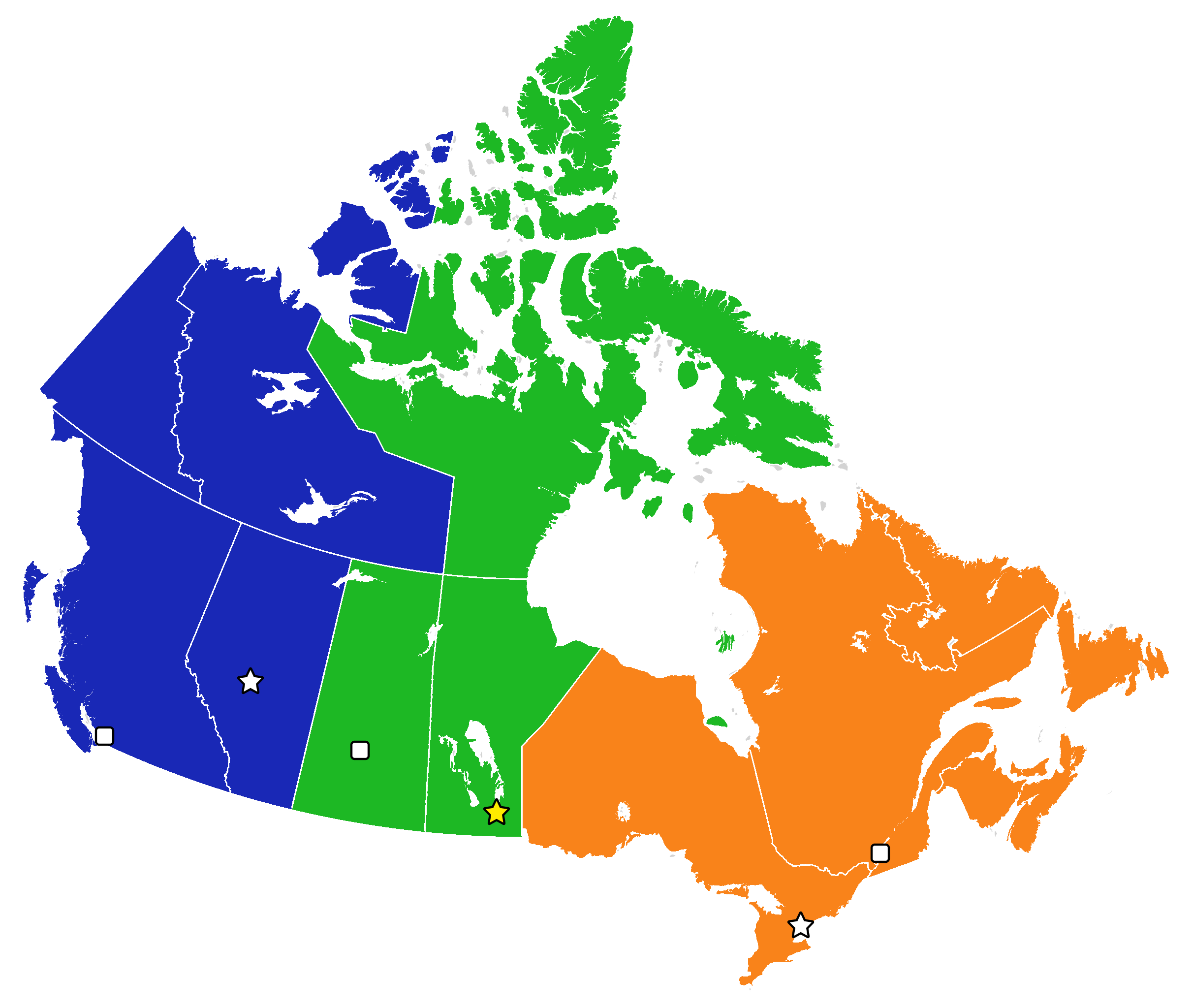
Map of the church's three eparchies (with cathedrals marked on the map): Western Eparchy (Edmonton) Central Eparchy (Winnipeg) Eastern Eparchy (Toronto)

The UOCC is divided into three eparchies or dioceses, the Eastern Eparchy, with its cathedral in Toronto, Ontario; the Central Eparchy, with its cathedral in Winnipeg, Manitoba; and the Western Eparchy, with its cathedral in Edmonton, Alberta. According to the custom of the UOCC the Church's primate is the titled the "Archbishop of Winnipeg and Metropolitan of Canada" and serves as the diocesan or ruling bishop of the Central Eparchy.

The Eastern Eparchy is led by Bishop Andriy (Peshko) of Toronto. The Western Eparchy is led by Bishop Ilarion (Rudnyk) of Edmonton and Western Canada. All of the UOCC's dioceses may have auxiliary bishops (titled 'Bishop of Vancouver' in the Western Eparchy, 'Bishop of Saskatoon' in the Central Eparchy and 'Bishop of Montreal' in the Eastern Eparchy), but none of the Eparchies have an auxiliary bishop at this time.

=== Current hierarchy ===
- Central Eparchy
  - Metropolitan Ilarion (Rudnyk) of Winnipeg and Central Canada (2022-Present)
- Eastern Eparchy
  - Bishop Andriy (Peshko) of Toronto, Bishop of Toronto and Eastern Canada (2008–Present)
- Western Eparchy
  - Metropolitan Ilarion (Rudnyk) Acting Bishop of Edmonton and Western Canada (2008–Present)

== Leaders ==
=== Primates ===
List of primates, and years of primatial rule:

No.	Primateship	Picture	Name	Personal name	Date and place of birth	Date and place of death
1	1919–1924 (5 years)		Metropolitan; Germanos; Германос	Germanos; Shehadeh	18 January 1872; Beirut, Ottoman Empire	7 April 1934; Beirut, Greater Lebanon
2	1924–1946 (22 years)		Metropolitan; John (Theodorovych); Іоанн (Теодорович)	Ivan; Teodorovych	6 October 1887; Krupets, Russian Empire	3 May 1971; Philadelphia, Pennsylvania
3	1947–1950 (3 years)		Archbishop; Mstyslav; Мстислав	Stepan; Ivanovych; Skrypnyk	10 April 1898; Poltava, Russian Empire	11 June 1993; Grimsby, Canada
4	1951–1972 (21 years)		Metropolitan; Ilarion; Іларіон	Ivan; Ivanovich; Ohienko	2 January 1882; Brusilov, Russian Empire	29 March 1972; Winnipeg, Manitoba
5	1972–1975 (3 years)		Metropolitan; Michael; Михаїл	Theodot; Nykyforovych; Khoroshy	10 July 1885; Fyodorovka, Russian Empire	5 May 1977; Toronto, Ontario
6	1975–1985 (10 years)		Metropolitan; Andrew; Андрей	Hryhoriy; Metiuk	3 January 1898; Terebiń, Russian Empire	2 February 1985; Winnipeg, Manitoba
7	1985–2005 (20 years)		Metropolitan; Wasyly; Василій	Wasyly; Fedak	1 November 1909; Kadubivtsi, Austria-Hungary	10 January 2005; Winnipeg, Manitoba
8	2005–2010 (5 years)		Metropolitan; John Stinka; Іван (Стінка)	Ivan; Stinka	14 January 1935; Buchanan, Saskatchewan	19 September 2022; Saskatoon, Saskatchewan
9	2010–2021 (11 years)		Metropolitan; Yurij; Юрій	Yurij; Petrovych; Kalistchuk	26 May 1951; Lachine, Quebec	–
10	2022–present (4 years)		Metropolitan; Ilarion; Іларіон	Roman; Mykolayovych; Rudnyk	14 February 1972; Lviv, Ukrainian SSR	–

=== Bishops ===
List of bishops who have served in the UOCC historically, and the years served:

- Metropolitan Germanos (Shehadi) of the Antiochian Orthodox Christian Archdiocese of North America - (1919-1924)
- Metropolitan John (Theodorovych) - (1924-1948)
- Archbishop Mstyslav (Skrypnyk) - (1949-1950)
- Metropolitan Ilarion (Ohienko) - (1951-1972)
- Metropolitan Michael (Khoroshy) - (1951-1977)
- Metropolitan Andrew (Metiuk) - (1959-1985)
- Archbishop Boris (Yakovkevych) - (1963-1984)
- Archbishop Mykolaj (Debryn) - (1975-1981)
- Metropolitan Wasyly (Fedak) - (1978-2005)
- Metropolitan John (Stinka) - (1983-2010)
- Metropolitan Yurij (Kalistchuk) - (1989–2021)
- Metropolitan Ilarion (Rudnyk) - (2008–Present)
- Bishop Andriy (Peshko) - (2008–Present)

== See also ==
- History of Christianity in Ukraine
- Assembly of Canonical Orthodox Bishops of Canada
