= Andrew Peshko =

Canadian Ukrainian Orthodox bishop

His Grace Bishop Andriy (Peshko)
- Bishop of Toronto and the Eastern Eparchy
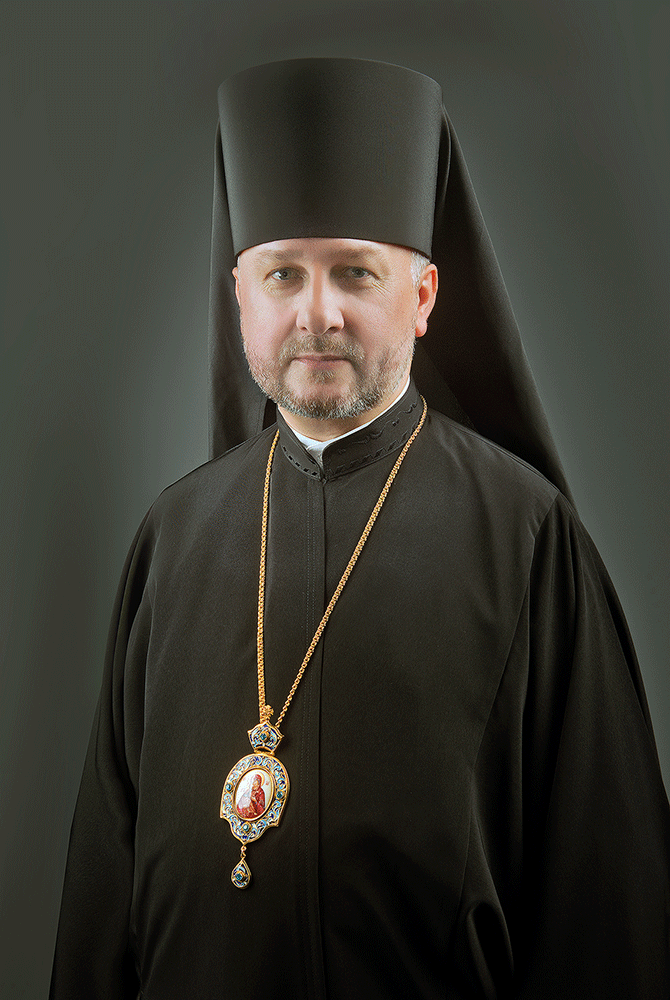
- Native name: Богдан Пешко
- Church: Ecumenical Patriarchate
- Metropolis: Ukrainian Orthodox Church of Canada
- Diocese: Toronto

Orders
- Ordination: April 8, 2001 by Archbishop Vsevolod (Maidansky) of Scopelos
- Consecration: December 13, 2005 by Archbishop Vsevolod (Maidansky) of Skopelos

Personal details
- Born: April 27, 1972 (age 54) Hriada, Zhovkva Raion, Lviv Oblast, Ukraine
- Education: St. Petersburg Theological Seminary
- Alma mater: Christ the Savior Theological Seminary

Andriy Peshko is the Bishop of Toronto and of the Eastern Eparchy of the Ukrainian Orthodox Church of Canada.

== Youth and education ==
Bohdan Peshko Ukrainian: Богдан Пешко) was born on April 27, 1972, in Hriada, Zhovkva Raion, Lviv Oblast, Ukraine. In 1979, he entered elementary school and received his Certificate of Secondary Education in 1989.

In 1989, he enrolled in the St. Petersburg Theological Seminary, from which he graduated in 1993.

From 1994 to 1995, he studied at Christ the Savior Theological Seminary of the American Carpatho-Rusyn Orthodox Diocese of the Ecumenical Patriarchate in Johnstown, Pennsylvania, under the omophorion of Metropolitan Nicholas (Smisko) of Amissos.

From 1995 to 1999 he completed the full course of the Kyiv Theological Academy. On December 25, 2000, the Academic Council of the Kyiv Theological Academy awarded him the Candidate (degree) in Theology – after the defence of his dissertation titled: "Historical–Liturgical Research of the Rites of Installation and Ordination in the Orthodox Church".

== Ordination and episcopacy ==
On April 8, 2001, he was ordained a deacon by Archbishop Vsevolod (Maidansky) of Scopelos at St. Volodymyr's Cathedral of the Ukrainian Orthodox Church of the USA, in Chicago.

On September 29, 2003, he was elevated to a rank of Protodeacon.

On September 21, 2005, with the blessing of Archbishop Vsevolod, Protodeacon Bohdan Peshko was tonsured a monk and given the name Andriy (in honour of St. Andrew the First-Called) at St. Volodymyr Cathedral in Chicago.

On September 25, 2005, he was ordained to the rank of Hieromonk and was promoted to a rank of Hegumen by Archbishop Vsevolod.On October 21, 2005, in the Holy Transfiguration of the Lord Cathedral in London (England) he was elevated to the rank of Archimandrite.

On November 22, 2005, the Holy and Sacred Synod of the Ecumenical Patriarchate of Constantinople, under the Chairmanship of Patriarch Bartholomew I of Constantinople, unanimously elected him as Bishop for the Ukrainian Orthodox Church of Europe and the Diaspora with the title 'Bishop of Krateia'.

On December 13, 2005, at St. Volodymyr Cathedral in Chicago, he was consecrated Bishop by Metropolitan Constantine of Irinoupolis (Ukrainian Orthodox Church of the USA), Archbishop Vsevolod (Maidansky) of Skopelos, Metropolitan Nicholas (Smisko) of Amissos, Archbishop Nicholaj (Romanian Orthodox Archdiocese of America and Canada), Archbishop Job (Osacky) of Chicago (Orthodox Church in America), Archbishop Antony (Ukrainian Orthodox Church of the USA), Archbishop Yurij (Kalistchuk) (Ukrainian Orthodox Church of Canada).

From August 20–24, 2008, at the Extraordinary Sobor of the Ukrainian Orthodox Church of Canada (UOCC), held in Saskatoon, Saskatchewan, he was elected as Bishop-elect of Saskatoon, Vicar of the Central Eparchy of the UOCC.

On February 1, 2011, he assumed the responsibilities of Bishop of the Eastern Eparchy of the UOCC.

On May 19, 2021, the Holy and Sacred Synod of the Ecumenical Patriarchate elected Bishop Andriy as Bishop of Toronto. On August 31, 2021, Bishop Andriy served the rite of proclamation at the Phanar, thus officially accepting his election and new title.

== Sources ==
- Bishop Andriy (Peshko) of Saskatoon
