= Hilarion Rudnyk =

Eastern Orthodox bishop

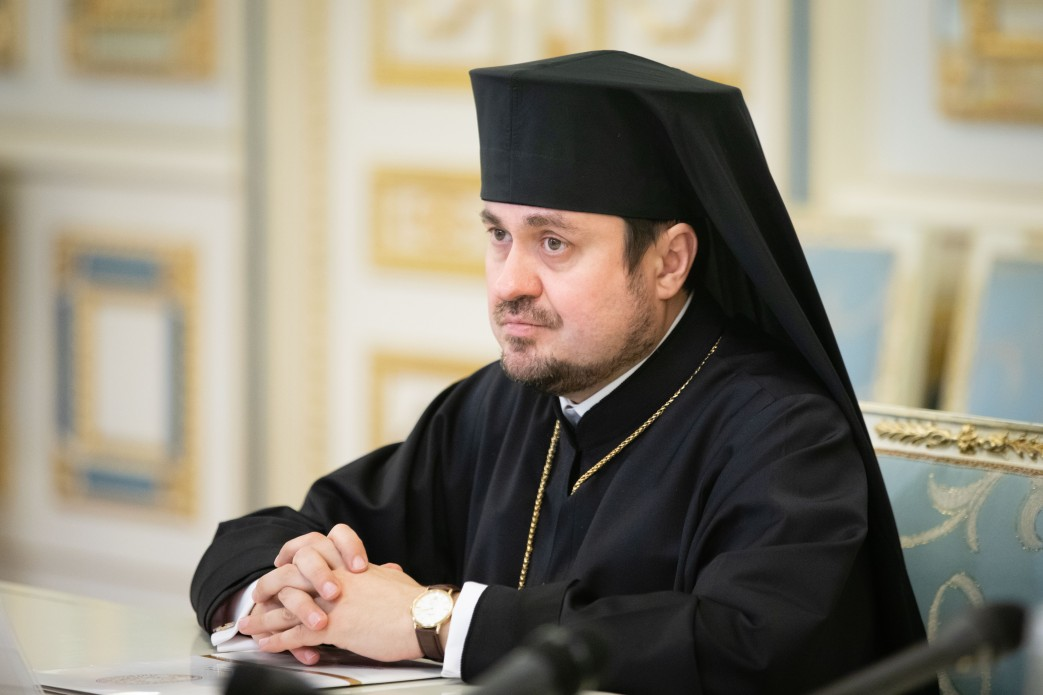
Ilarion (Rudnyk)

Metropolitan Ilarion (Ukrainian: Іларіон, secular name Roman Mykolayovych Rudnyk, Ukrainian: Роман Миколайович Рудник; February 14, 1972, Lviv, Ukrainian SSR) is the metropolitan of the autonomous Ukrainian Orthodox Church of Canada. Prior to his election to metropolitan, he was bishop of Edmonton and the Western eparchy.

== Youth & education ==
He undertook his primary, secondary school in Lviv in Soviet Ukraine.

After taking his entrance exams, he was admitted to the second year at the Kyiv Theological Seminary from which he graduated in 1992, a year after Ukraine declared its independence from the USSR. At the recommendation of Archbishop Vsevolod (Maidansky) of Scopelos, and with the blessing of Patriarch Bartholomew of Constantinople, Roman Rudnyk then moved to Greece to continue his theological studies at the theological faculty of the Aristotle University of Thessaloniki, from which he graduated in 1997.

== Tonsure and ordination ==
On December 5, 1997 Metropolitan Panteleimon (Rodopoulos) of Tyrolois and Serention tonsured him a monk with the name Ilarion in honour of Ilarion the Great. On December 21 of same year he ordained him to the rank of hierodeacon. On September 14, 2000 he ordained him to the rank of hieromonk.

Hieromonk Ilarion continued his theological studies in Canon Law and took a Masters in 2001, successfully defending his thesis "Canonical relations between the Metropolis of Kyiv and the Ecumenical Patriarchate until 1240".

During 2001-2002 he attended English language lessons at the University of Illinois in Chicago.

In October 2002 he was sent to Portugal to serve at the newly created Saint Panteleimon parish in Porto.

On March 21, 2004, was elevated to the rank of archimandrite by the Holy Synod of the Constantinopolitan Orthodox Church.

== Episcopacy ==
On January 11, 2005, the Holy Synod elected archimandrite Ilarion to the episcopacy as Bishop of Telmissos to serve as an auxiliary or assistant to the Greek Orthodox Metropolitan Epiphanius of Spain and Portugal. On January 29, 2005, Bishop-elect Ilarion was consecrated to the episcopacy in the patriarchal Church of St. George in Constantinople.

Bishop Ilarion served in the Iberian Peninsula until, at the request of Metropolitan John (Stinka) of the UOCC, the Holy Synod of the Ecumenical Patriarchate elected him diocesan Bishop of Edmonton on October 21, 2008. He was formally enthroned as Bishop of Edmonton and Western Canada on October 26, 2008, in Edmonton's Ukrainian Orthodox Cathedral of St. John.

On September 7, 2018, the Chief Secretariat of the Patriarchate of Constantinople Holy Synod announced the appointment of Bishop Hilarion and Archbishop Daniel of Pamphilon as ‘exarchs’ of the Patriarchate of Constantinople for Kiev.
