= St. Andrew's College, Manitoba =

Ukrainian Orthodox Church institution

St. Andrew’s College
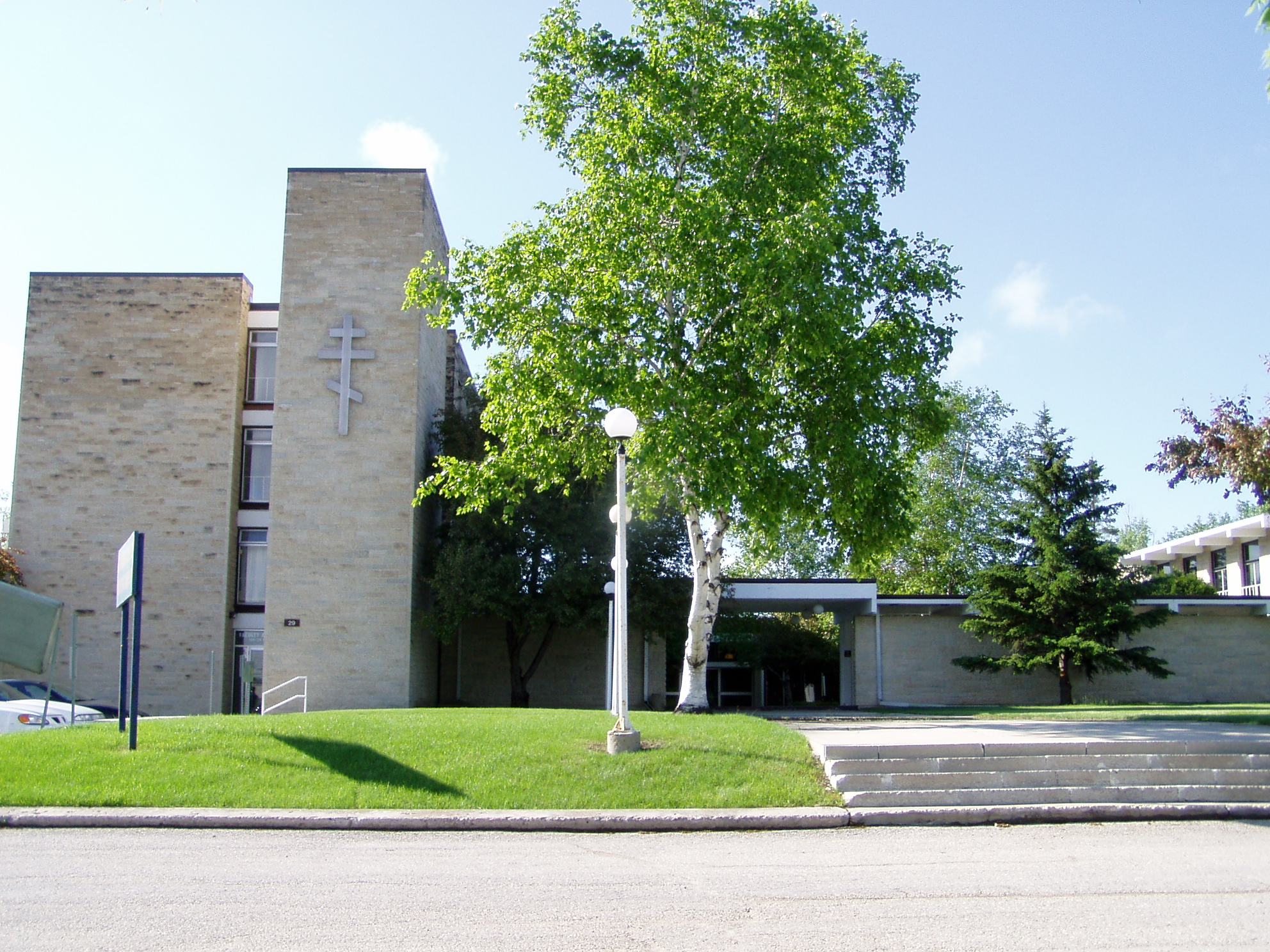
- The college in 2005
- Type: Theological school
- Religious affiliation: Ukrainian Orthodox Church of Canada
- Academic affiliations: University of Manitoba
- Principal: Roman Bozyk
- Academic staff: 5
- Location: 29 Dysart Road, Winnipeg, Manitoba, Canada; 49°48′39.1032″N 97°8′27.8514″W
- Website: umanitoba.ca/st-andrews-college/

St. Andrew's College is an institution of the Ukrainian Orthodox Church of Canada and is affiliated with the University of Manitoba in Winnipeg. Succeeding prior theological institutions, the College was established in 1946. In 1962, it became an associated college of the University of Manitoba and later moved to the University's campus, where it has remained since.

The college exists to promote spiritual, academic, cultural and moral leadership within the Church, the Ukrainian Canadian community, and the Canadian community.

== History ==
St. Andrew's College traces its beginnings to Pastoral Courses in Theology that were conducted in Saskatoon and Regina since 1918. In 1932, those courses evolved into Ukrainian Greek Orthodox Seminary and moved to Winnipeg.

St. Andrew's College would officially be established in 1946, succeeding the small seminary there already there. It was located in the north end of Winnipeg.

In 1962, St. Andrew's College became an associated college of the University of Manitoba. In 1964, the college moved to the university campus and was officially opened with a ceremony on July 4th of that year. The opening was attended by then Premier of Manitoba Dufferin Roblin, several prominent members of Ukrainian Orthodox clergy, and more than 500 faithful.

The college became an affiliated college to the university in 1981 and established the Centre for Ukrainian Canadian Studies.

The college is similar to two other religious schools affiliated with the University of Manitoba, Anglican St. John's College, and Catholic St. Paul's College.

== Academics ==
As of May 2022, the College administered the following programs:

- Academic programs in the Faculty of Theology
  - Diploma in Theology (2 year program)
  - Certificate in Theology (1 year program)
  - Bachelor of Theology (4 year program)
  - Master of Divinity (1 year program)
- High school program
- Ukrainian Cultural Summer Courses

== Principals of St. Andrew’s College ==
The principals of St. Andrews's College have been as follows:

- 1946 - 1950: F. G. Hawryluk
- 1950 - 1952: G. Woloshynowski
- 1952 - 1955: S. W. Sawchuk
- 1955 - 1958: D. F. Stratychuk
- 1958 - 1959: H. D. Hrycyna
- 1963 - 1968: S. W. Sawchuk
- 1968 - 1974: L. Tomaschuk
- 1974 - 1975: J. R. Solomon
- 1975 - 1978: M. Yurkiwsky
- 1978 - 1981: P. A. Kondra
- 1981 - 1984: O. Krawchenko
- 1984 - 1985: R. Yereniuk
- 1985 - 1986: O. Krawchenko
- 1986 - 1987: O. Trosky
- 1987 - 1988: D. Luchak
- 1988 - 1998: R. Yereniuk
- 1998 - 1999: Roman W. Bozyk (Acting Principal)
- 1999 - 2003: V. Olender
- 2003 - present: Roman W. Bozyk (Acting Principal)
