= Religion in Edmonton =

Overview of the religion share in Edmonton

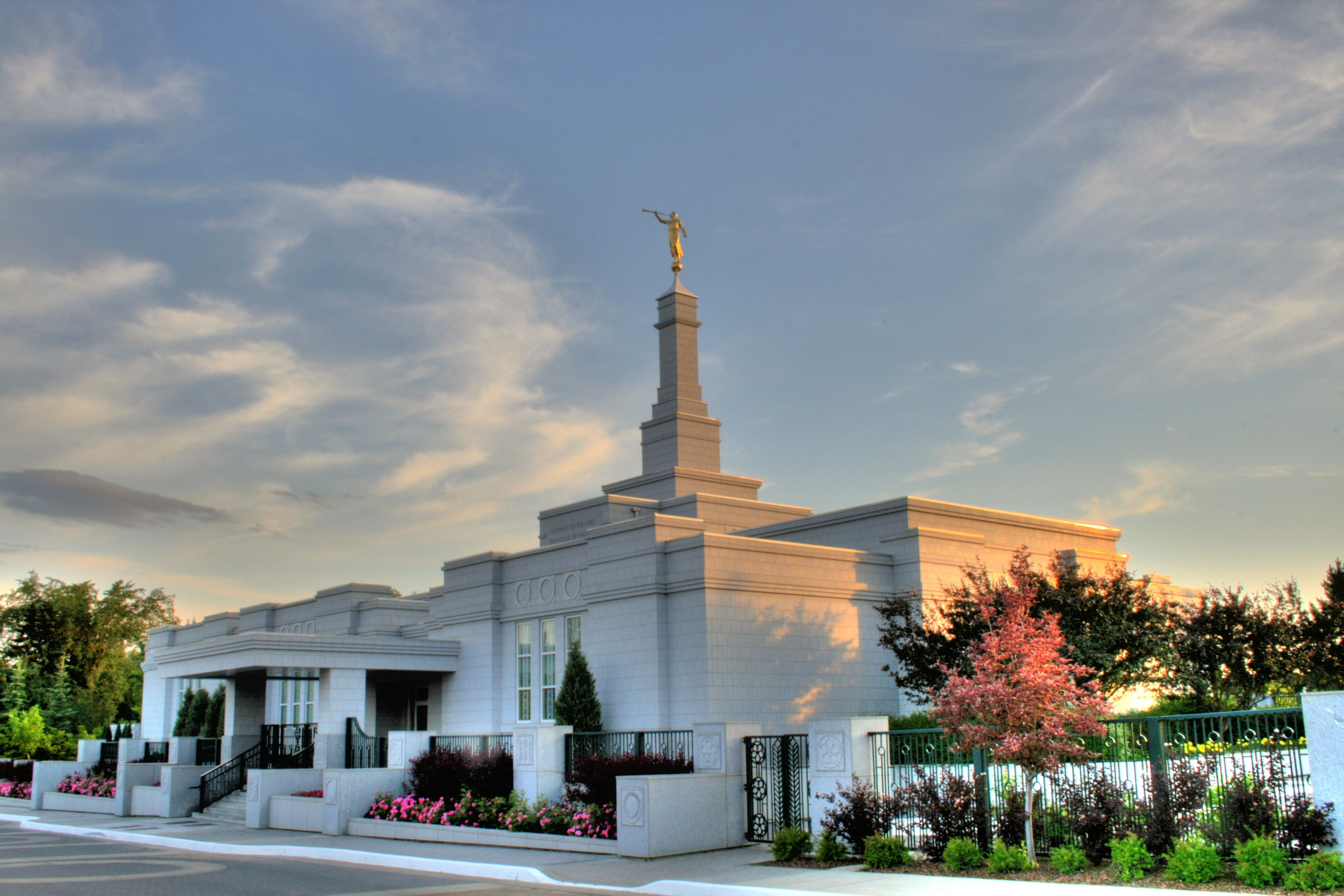
The LDS Edmonton Alberta Temple, at the 53rd Avenue exit on the east side of the Whitemud Freeway

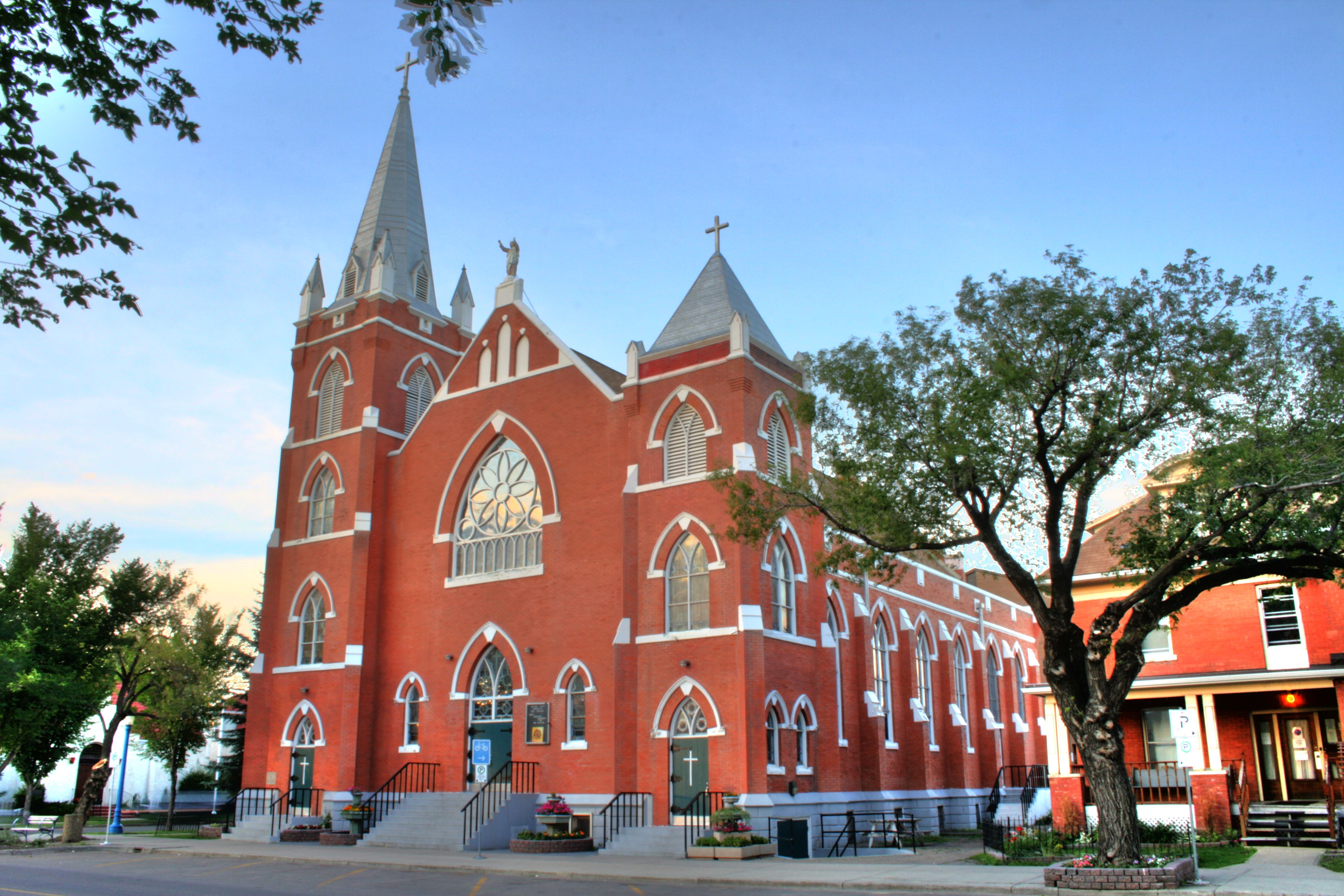
Sacred Heart Church of the First Peoples, on "Church Street" (96 Street) in Edmonton's inner city area

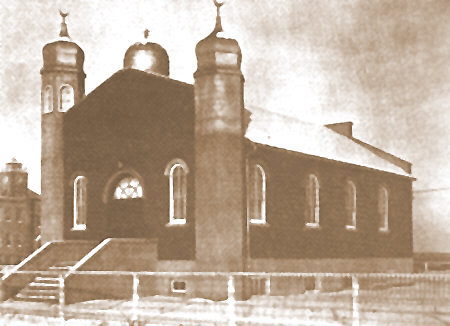
Al-Rashid Mosque, Canada's oldest Mosque

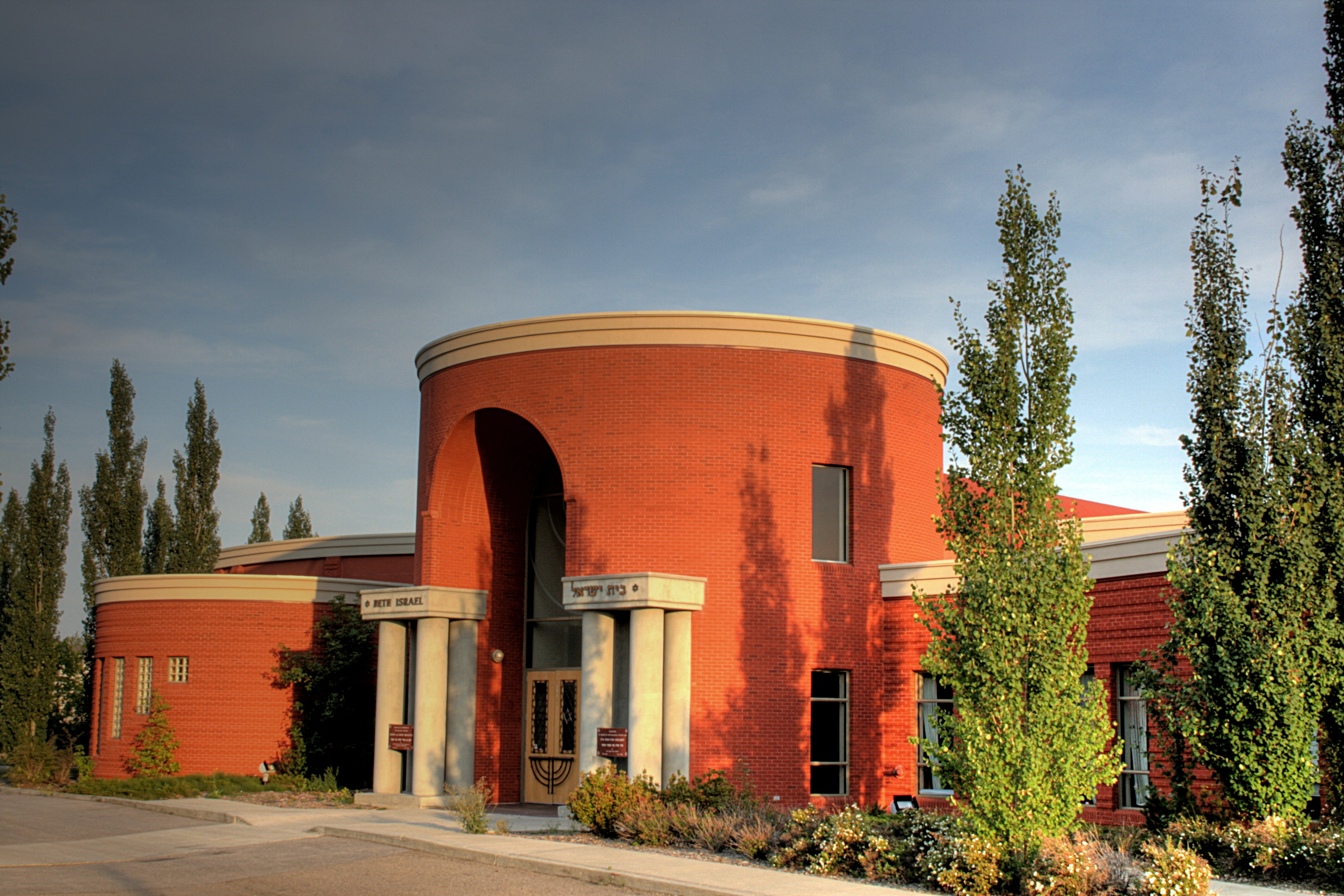
Beth Israel Synagogue, Edmonton's oldest synagogue

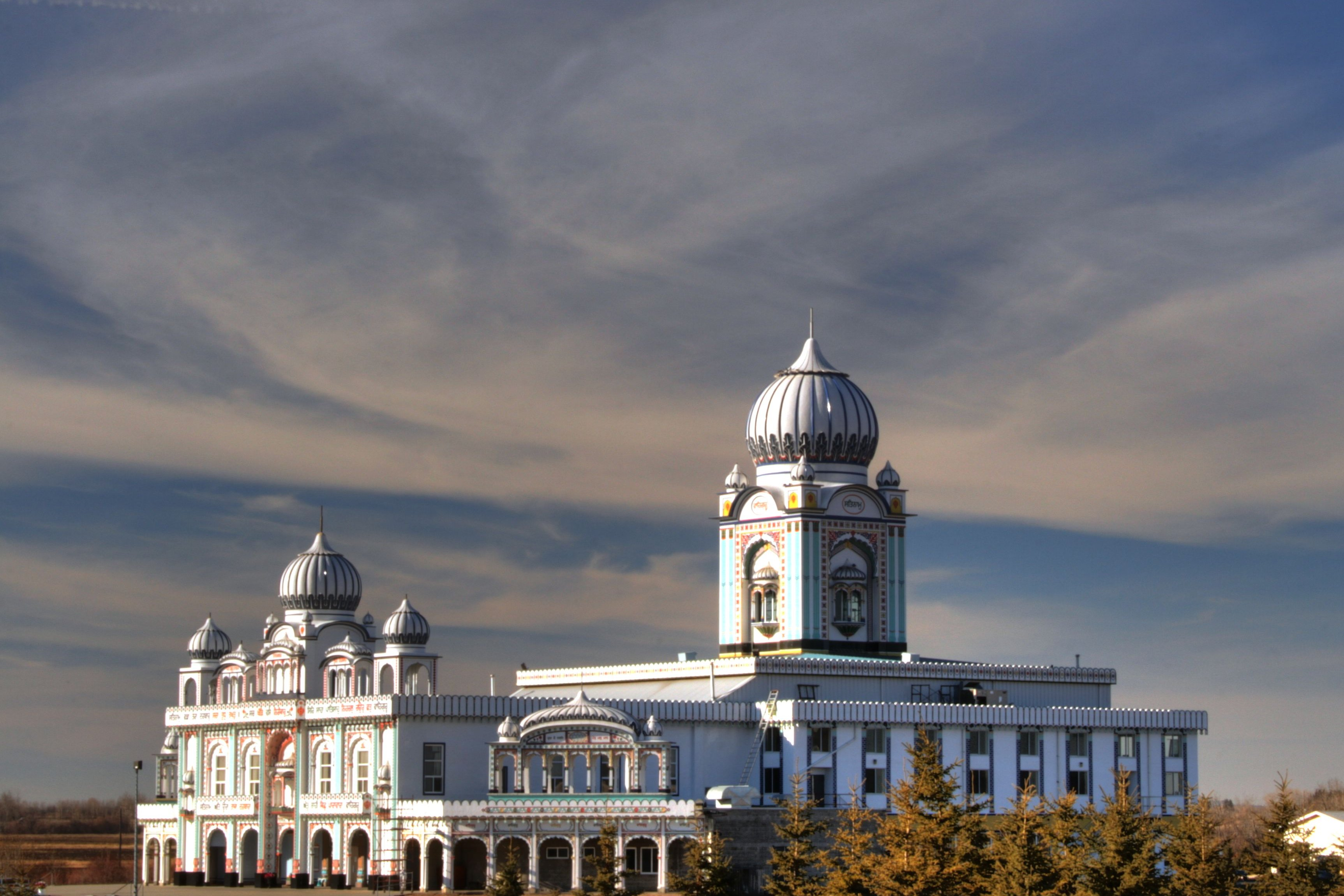
Nanaksar Gurdwara Gursikh (Sikh Temple) in north Edmonton

Religion in Edmonton consists of the diverse religious traditions of the people who live in Edmonton, the capital of Alberta.

As of the 2011 National Household Survey, 55.8% of Edmonton residents identified themselves as Christian with 25.9% of the total being Catholic. 31.1% have no religious affiliation, 12.5% belong to other Christian denominations, 5.5% are Muslim, 2.6% are Sikh, and 2.1% are Buddhist. One of Alberta's three Baháʼí Centres is located in Edmonton; the other two centres are situated in Sylvan Lake, Alberta, and Athabasca, Alberta. The first mosque established in Canada—the Al-Rashid Mosque, founded by Abdullah Yusuf Ali—is situated in Edmonton. Edmonton has an Ahmadiyya mosque, named Baitul Hadi Mosque. Edmonton also hosts a Maronite Catholic church, on 76th Avenue/98th Street, with services in English on Saturdays and Arabic on Sundays. The Lebanese community also has a Druze Community Centre on the north side of the city. The Edmonton Alberta Temple of the Church of Jesus Christ of Latter-day Saints was dedicated on December 11, 1999. The Hindu Community in Edmonton is served by the Hindu Society of Alberta (North Indian Temple) and the Maha Ganapathy Society of Alberta (South Indian Temple). The Sikh community in Edmonton is served by four Gurudawaras. The Jewish Community in Edmonton is served by Jewish Federation of Edmonton. The region is served by five synagogues. Edmonton is also home to two of Alberta's four Unitarian Universalist congregations—the Unitarian Church of Edmonton and the Westwood Unitarian Congregation; the other two are located in Calgary and Lethbridge.

== Christian sees ==
Edmonton is the home several episcopal sees, or the official headquarters of a Christian bishop located at a cathedral, including:

Denomination	Title	See	Cathedral	Reference
Anglican	Bishop	Diocese of Edmonton	All Saints'	
Lutheran	Bishop	Synod of Alberta and the Territories	None. Office of the Bishop at Trinity Evangelical Lutheran	
Roman Catholic	Archbishop	Archdiocese of Edmonton	St. Joseph's	
Russian Orthodox	Bishop	Patriarchal parishes in Canada	St. Barbara	
Orthodox Church of Canada	Bishop	Edmonton and All Western Canada Eparchy	All Saints'	
Ukrainian Catholic	Bishop	Eparchy of Edmonton	St. Josaphat	
Ukrainian Orthodox	Archbishop	Edmonton and Western Canada Eparchy	St. John	

== See also ==
- Demographics of Edmonton
