= Christianity in Canada =

Religious community

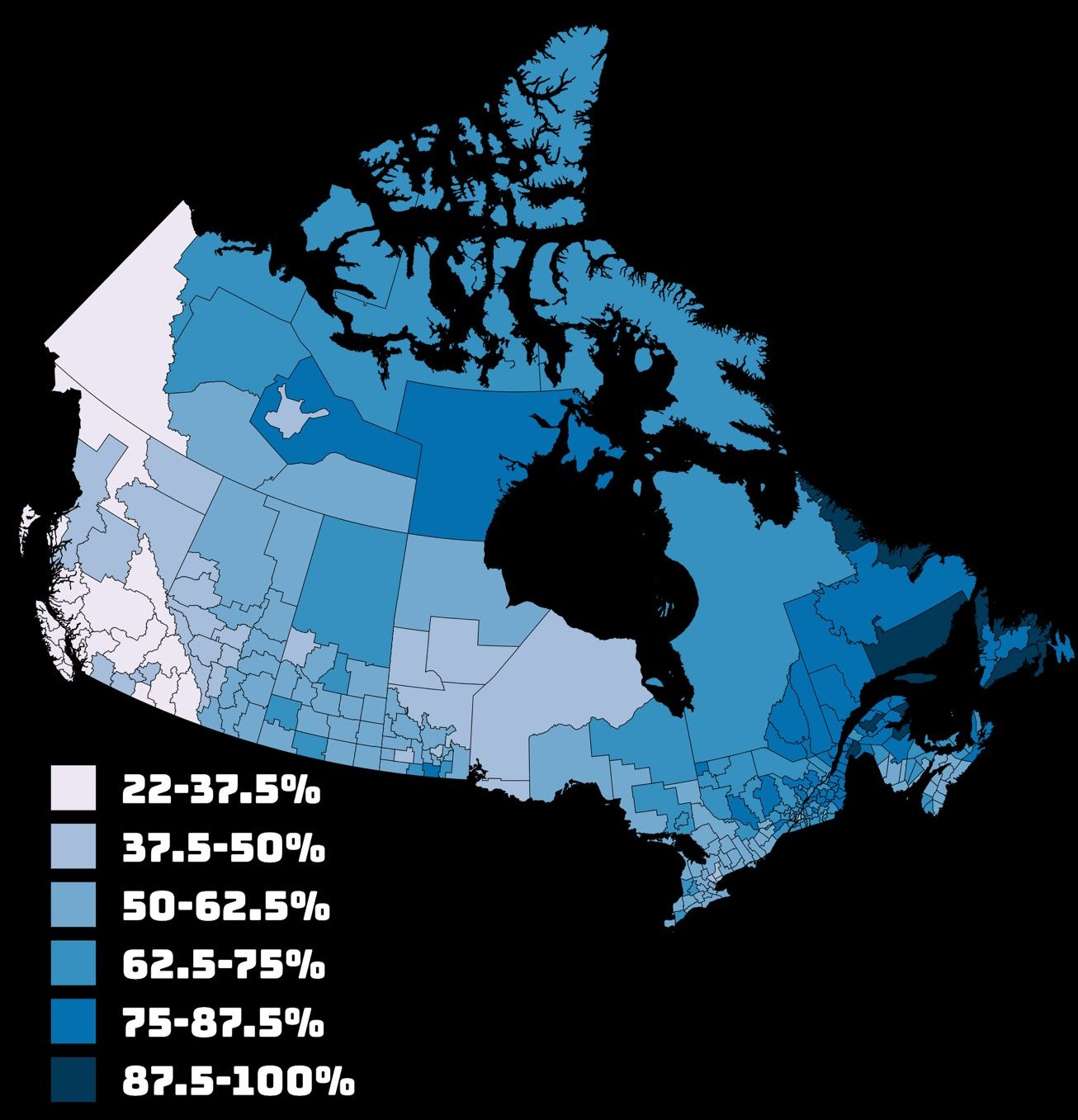
- Population distribution of Christian Canadians by census division, 2021 census

Total population
- 19,373,330; 53.3% of the total Canadian population (2021)

Regions with significant populations
- Ontario: 7,315,815 (52.14%)
- Quebec: 5,385,240 (64.82%)
- Alberta: 2,009,820 (48.11%)
- British Columbia: 1,684,870 (34.27%)
- Manitoba: 708,850 (54.23%)

Languages
- Canadian English • Canadian French; Other Languages of Canada

Related ethnic groups
- American Christians • Australian Christians • British Christians • New Zealander Christians

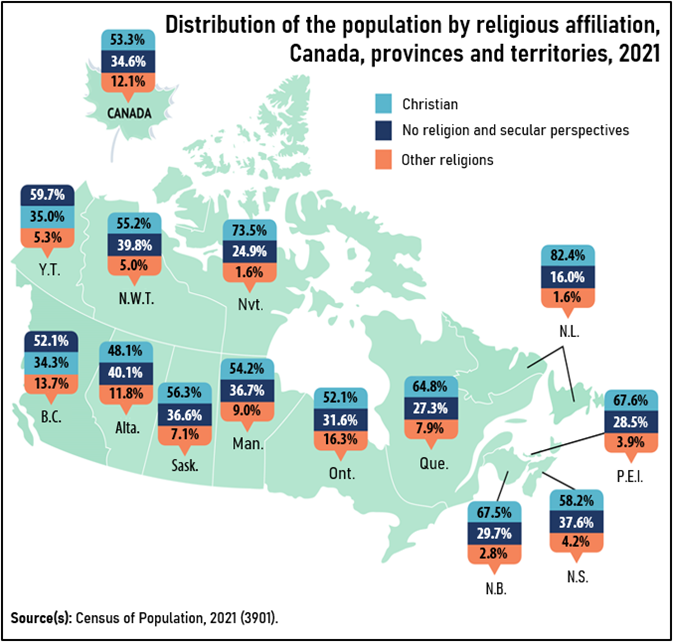
A map of Canada by province and territory showing the distribution of the population by religious affiliation in 2021

Christianity is the most common religion in Canada, with 53.3% of the total population or 19.3 million people being Christian in 2021. The preamble to the Canadian Charter of Rights and Freedoms refers to God. The French colonization beginning in the 17th century established a Roman Catholic francophone population in New France, especially Acadia and Lower Canada (now Nova Scotia, New Brunswick and Quebec). British colonization brought waves of Anglicans and other Protestants to Upper Canada, now Ontario. The Russian Empire spread Orthodox Christianity in a small extent to the tribes in the far north and western coasts, particularly hyperborean nomads like the Inuit. Orthodoxy would arrive in mainland Canada with immigrants from the eastern and southern Austro-Hungarian Empire and western Russian Empire starting in the 1890s; then refugees from the Soviet Union, Eastern Bloc, Greece and elsewhere during the last half of the 20th century.

== History ==
Christianity first arrived in the territory later known as Canada in 1497, when the Catholic, John Cabot, landed on Newfoundland, raised the Venetian and Papal banners and claimed the land for his sponsor King Henry VII of England, while recognizing the religious authority of the Roman Catholic Church. A letter of John Day states that Cabot landed on 24 June 1497 and "he landed at only one spot of the mainland, near the place where land was first sighted, and they disembarked there with a crucifix and raised banners with the arms of the Holy Father and those of the King of England". In 1608, Samuel de Champlain founded the first Catholic colony in Quebec City.

== Demographics, concentration, and life ==
Percentage of Christians per Canadian province or territory based on 2021 Census data 80-89.9% Christian 70-79.9% Christian 60-69.9% Christian 50-59.9% Christian 40-49.9% Christian 30-39.9% Christian

The majority of Canadian Christians attend church services infrequently. Cross-national surveys of religiosity rates such as the Pew Global Attitudes Project indicate that, on average, Canadian Christians are less observant than those of the United States but are still more overtly religious than their counterparts in Western Europe. In 2002, 30% of Canadians reported to Pew researchers that religion was "very important" to them. A 2005 Gallup poll showed that 28% of Canadians consider religion to be "very important" (55% of Americans and 19% of Britons say the same). Regional differences within Canada exist, however, with British Columbia and Quebec reporting especially low metrics of traditional religious observance, as well as a significant urban-rural divide, while Alberta and rural Ontario saw high rates of religious attendance. The rates for weekly church attendance are contested, with estimates running as low as 11% as per the latest Ipsos-Reid poll and as high as 25% as per Christianity Today magazine. This American magazine reported that three polls conducted by Focus on the Family, Time Canada and the Vanier Institute of the Family showed church attendance increasing for the first time in a generation, with weekly attendance at 25 per cent. This number is similar to the statistics reported by premier Canadian sociologist of religion, Prof. Reginald Bibby of the University of Lethbridge, who has been studying Canadian religious patterns since 1975. Although lower than in the US, which has reported weekly church attendance at about 40% since the Second World War, weekly church attendance rates are higher than those in Northern Europe.

As well as the large churches — Roman Catholic, United, and Anglican, which together count more than half of the Canadian population as nominal adherents — Canada also has many smaller Christian groups, including Orthodox Christianity. The Egyptian population in Ontario and Quebec (Greater Toronto in particular) has seen a large influx of the Coptic Orthodox population in just a few decades. The relatively large Ukrainian population of Manitoba and Saskatchewan has produced many followers of the Ukrainian Catholic and Ukrainian Orthodox Churches, while southern Manitoba has been settled largely by Mennonites. The concentration of these smaller groups often varies greatly across the country. Baptists are especially numerous in the Maritimes. The Maritimes, prairie provinces, and southwestern Ontario have significant numbers of Lutherans. Southwest Ontario has seen large numbers of German and Russian immigrants, including many Mennonites and Hutterites, as well as a significant contingent of Dutch Reformed. Alberta has seen considerable immigration from the American plains, creating a significant Mormon minority in that province. The Church of Jesus Christ of Latter-day Saints claimed to have 178,102 members (74,377 of whom in Alberta) at the end of 2007. And according to the Jehovah's Witnesses year report there are 111,963 active members (members who actively preach) in Canada.

Canada as a nation is becoming increasingly religiously diverse, especially in large urban centres such as Toronto, Vancouver, and Montreal, where minority groups and new immigrants who make up the growth in most religious groups congregate. Two significant trends become clear when the current religious landscape is examined closely. One is the loss of 'secularized' Canadians as active and regular participants in the churches and denominations they grew up in, which were overwhelmingly Christian, while these churches remain a part of Canadians' cultural identity. The other is the increasing presence of ethnically diverse immigration within the religious makeup of the country.

As Mainline Protestants and Roman Catholics have experienced drastic losses over the past 30 years, others have been expanding rapidly: overall by 144% in 'Eastern' religions during the 1981-1991 decade. Considering Canada's increasing reliance on immigration to bolster a low birth rate, the situation is only likely to continue to diversify. This increased influx of ethnic immigrants not only affects the types of religions represented in the Canadian context but also the increasingly multicultural and multilingual makeup of individual Christian denominations. From Chinese Anglican or Korean United Church communities, to the Lutheran focus on providing much needed services to immigrants new to the Canadian context and English language, immigration is making changes.

For some Protestant denominations, adapting to a new secular context has meant adjusting to their non-institutional roles in society by increasingly focusing on social justice. However the pull between conservative religious members and the more radical among the church members is complicated by the numbers of immigrant communities who may desire a church that fulfils a more 'institutionally complete' role as a buffer in this new country over the current tension filled debates over same-sex marriage, ordination of women and homosexuals, or the role of women in the church. This of course will depend on the background of the immigrant population, as in the Hong Kong context where ordination of Florence Li Tim Oi happened long before women's ordination was ever raised on the Canadian Anglican church level.

As well a multicultural focus on the churches part may include non-Christian elements (such as the inclusion of a Buddhist priest in one incident) which are unwelcome to the transplanted religious community. Serving the needs and desires of different aspects of the Canadian and newly Canadian populations makes a difficult balancing act for the various mainline churches which are starved for money and active parishioners in a time when 16% of Canadians identify as non-religious and up to two-thirds of those who do identify with a denomination use the church only for its life-cycle rituals governing birth, marriage, and death.

Evangelical portions of the Protestant groups proclaim their growth as well but as Roger O'Tool notes they make up 7% of the Canadian population and seem to gain most of their growth from a higher birthrate. What is significant is the higher participation of their members in contrast to Mainline Protestants and Roman Catholics. This high commitment would seem to translate into the kind of political power evangelicals in the United States enjoy but despite Canada's historically Christian background as Lori Beaman notes neatly "...[forming] the backdrop for social process" explicit religiosity appears to have not effectively moved the government towards legal discrimination against gay marriage. Much as many Roman Catholics in Quebec ignore the Church's stance on birth control, abortion, or premarital sex, the churches do not dictate much of the daily lives of regular Canadians.

There was a major religious revival in Toronto in the 1990s known as the Toronto Blessing at a small Vineyard Church near the Toronto Pearson International Airport. This religious event was the largest tourist attraction to Toronto in the year 1994. This event was characterized by unusual religious ecstasy such as being slain in the Spirit, laughing uncontrollably, and other odd behavior.

A 2015 study estimates some 43,000 believers in Christ from a Muslim background in Canada, most of whom belong to the evangelical tradition.

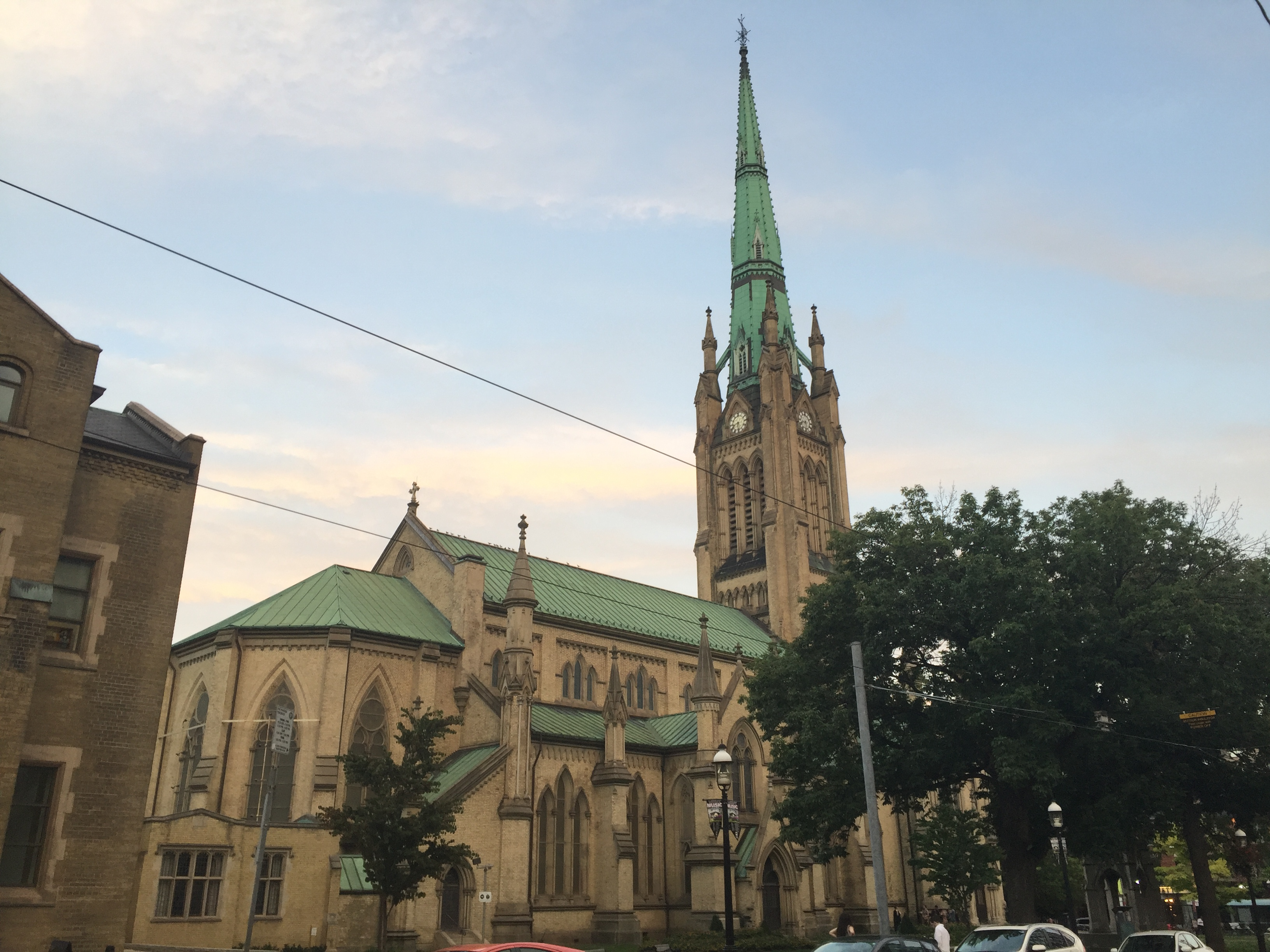
St. James Church, an Anglican cathedral in Old Toronto.

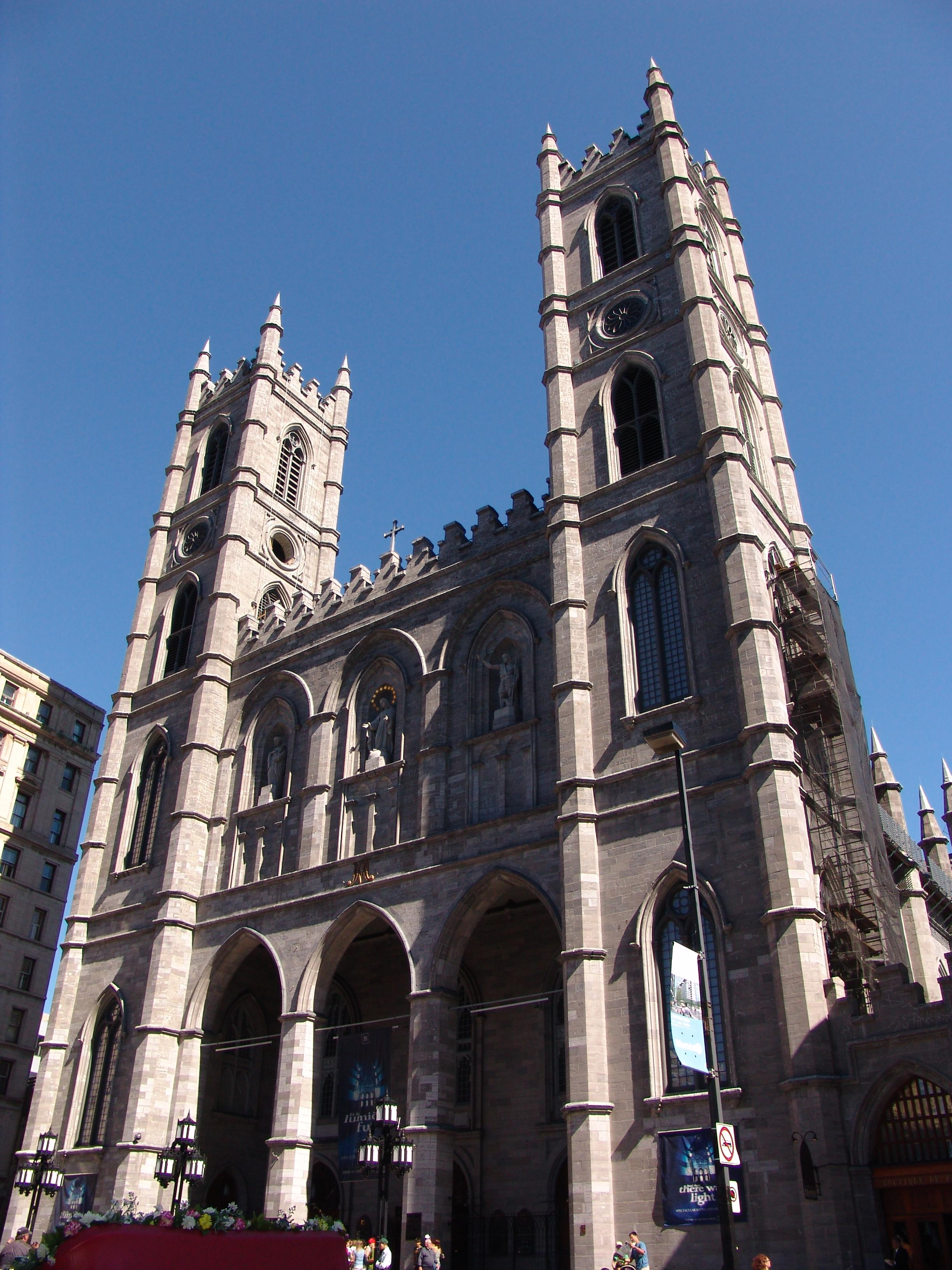
Notre-Dame Basilica, a Roman Catholic church in Old Montreal of Montreal, Quebec. On its completion in 1888, it was the largest church building in North America.

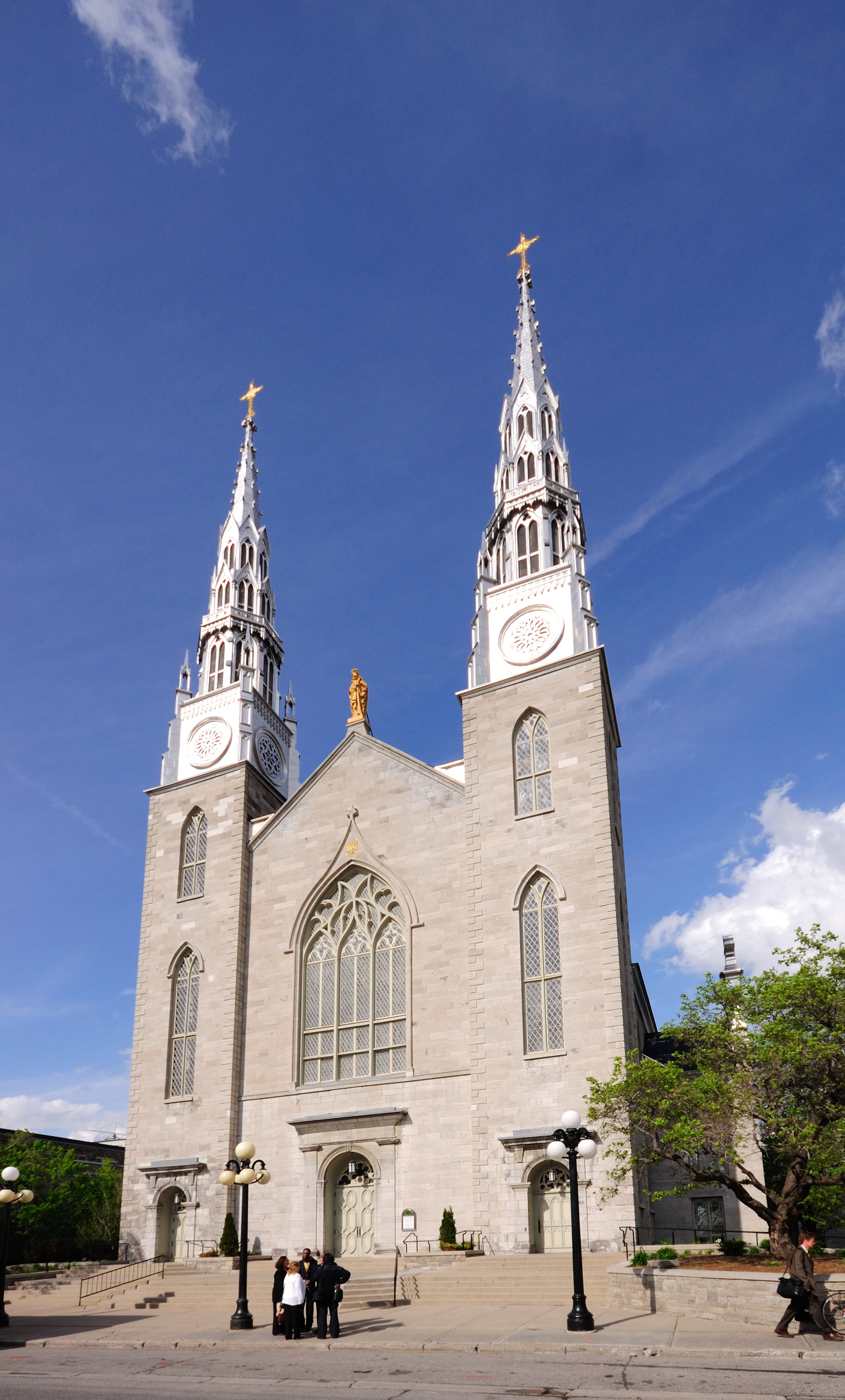
Front of the Notre-Dame Cathedral Basilica in Ottawa

Christian denominations in Canada (1981–2021)
Christian denomination	Population	1981 Canadian census		1991 Canadian census		2001 Canadian census		2011 Canadian census		2021 Canadian census	
Christian denomination	Population	Pop.	%	Pop.	%	Pop.	%	Pop.	%	Pop.	%
Total Christian population		21,678,740	90%	22,503,360	83.4%	22,851,825	77.1%	22,102,745	67.3%	19,373,330	53.3%
Catholic group	Roman Catholic	11,210,390	46.55%	12,203,625	45.21%	12,793,125	43.16%	12,728,885	38.75%	10,799,070	29.73%
Catholic group	Eastern Catholic Churches	190,590	0.79%	128,390	0.48%	126,200	0.43%	75,140	0.23%	77,965	0.21%
Catholic group	Catholic, n.i.e. & n.o.s.	1,630	0.01%	3,240	0.01%	1,965	0.01%	6,695	0.02%	3,325	0.01%
Total Catholic population		11,402,605	47.3%	12,335,255	45.7%	12,921,285	43.6%	12,810,705	39%	10,880,360	29.9%
Protestant group	United Church	3,758,015	15.6%	3,093,120	11.46%	2,839,125	9.58%	2,007,610	6.11%	1,214,185	3.34%
Protestant group	Anglican	2,436,375	10.12%	2,188,110	8.11%	2,035,500	6.87%	1,631,845	4.97%	1,134,310	3.12%
Protestant group	Presbyterian	812,105	3.37%	636,295	2.36%	409,830	1.38%	472,385	1.44%	301,400	0.83%
Protestant group	Lutheran	702,905	2.92%	636,210	2.36%	606,595	2.05%	478,185	1.46%	328,045	0.9%
Protestant group	Baptist	696,850	2.89%	663,360	2.46%	729,475	2.46%	635,840	1.94%	436,940	1.2%
Protestant group	Pentecostal–Charismatic	339,850	1.41%	438,995	1.63%	372,695	1.26%	480,670	1.46%	399,035	1.1%
Protestant group	Methodist–Evangelical	259,500	1.08%	311,240	1.15%	308,975	1.04%	292,205	0.89%	247,240	0.68%
Protestant group	Anabaptist	235,705	0.98%	269,190	1%	243,275	0.82%	201,190	0.61%	158,270	0.44%
Protestant group	Jehovah's Witness	143,480	0.6%	168,370	0.62%	154,750	0.52%	137,775	0.42%	137,255	0.38%
Protestant group	Protestant, n.i.e. & n.o.s.	137,425	0.57%	720,385	2.67%	641,305	2.16%	647,140	1.97%	514,055	1.42%
Protestant group	Reformed Bodies	104,175	0.43%	119,020	0.44%	115,735	0.39%	102,830	0.31%	80,650	0.22%
Protestant group	Latter Day Saints	89,870	0.37%	100,770	0.37%	104,745	0.35%	108,665	0.33%	87,725	0.24%
Protestant group	Adventist	41,605	0.17%	52,360	0.19%	62,880	0.21%	66,940	0.2%	68,935	0.19%
Protestant group	Unitarian/Universalist	17,510	0.07%	19,910	0.07%	20,535	0.07%	—N/a (Note: Classified as a separate religion following the 2011 census.)	—N/a	—N/a	—N/a
Protestant group	Spiritualist	1,940	0.01%	3,735	0.01%	3,295	0.01%	—N/a	—N/a	—N/a	—N/a
Protestant group	Congregationalist	145	0%	6,600	0.02%	6,155	0.02%	2,510	0.01%	1,150	0%
Total Protestant population		9,777,465	40.6%	9,427,675	34.9%	8,654,845	29.2%	7,265,775	22.1%	5,109,210	14.1%
Orthodox group	Eastern Orthodox Church	333,760	1.39%	290,395	1.08%	303,025	1.02%	307,145	0.93%	326,855	0.9%
Orthodox group	Orthodox, n.i.e. & n.o.s.	18,375	0.08%	79,290	0.29%	170,060	0.57%	207,480	0.63%	230,845	0.64%
Orthodox group	Oriental Orthodox Churches	9,430	0.04%	17,710	0.07%	22,160	0.07%	36,070	0.11%	65,310	0.18%
Total Orthodox population		361,560	1.5%	387,390	1.4%	495,245	1.7%	550,690	1.7%	623,005	1.7%
Total Christian, n.i.e. & n.o.s. population		137,110	0.6%	353,040	1.3%	780,450	2.6%	1,475,575	4.5%	2,760,755	7.6%
Total responses		24,083,495	98.9%	26,994,040	98.9%	29,639,035	98.8%	32,852,320	98.1%	36,328,480	98.2%
Total Canadian population		24,343,181	100%	27,296,859	100%	30,007,094	100%	33,476,688	100%	36,991,981	100%

Province/Territory	Christians
Newfoundland and Labrador	82.44%
Nunavut	73.53%
Prince Edward Island	67.62%
New Brunswick	67.52%
Quebec	64.82%
Nova Scotia	58.18%
Saskatchewan	56.31%
Manitoba	54.23%
Northwest Territories	55.16%
Canada	53.33%
Ontario	52.14%
Alberta	48.11%
Yukon	35.01%
British Columbia	34.27%

== Major denominational families ==
Christian denominations in Canada are usually divided into two large groups: Protestantism and Catholicism. There are also Christian denominations that do not fall within either of these groups, such as Eastern Orthodoxy and Oriental Orthodoxy, but they are much smaller.

=== Protestantism ===
Protestantism in Canada has existed ever since parts of northern Canada were colonized by the English.

Protestantism in Canada (1871−2021)
Branch/Denomination	1871 census		1881 census		1891 census		1901 census		1911 census		1921 census		1931 census		1941 census		1951 census		1961 census		1971 census		1981 census		1991 census		2001 census		2011 census		2021 census	
Branch/Denomination	Pop.	%	Pop.	%	Pop.	%	Pop.	%	Pop.	%	Pop.	%	Pop.	%	Pop.	%	Pop.	%	Pop.	%	Pop.	%	Pop.	%	Pop.	%	Pop.	%	Pop.	%	Pop.	%
Methodist–Evangelical	572,396	16.42%	742,981	17.18%	861,714	17.83%	945,043	17.59%	1,118,300	15.52%	1,207,515	13.74%	79,239	0.76%	70,673	0.61%	136,492	0.97%	164,796	0.9%	176,010	0.82%	259,500	1.08%	311,240	1.15%	308,975	1.04%	292,205	0.89%	247,240	0.68%
Presbyterian	544,998	15.63%	676,165	15.63%	755,326	15.63%	842,459	15.68%	1,115,472	15.48%	1,409,407	16.04%	870,728	8.39%	830,597	7.22%	781,747	5.58%	818,558	4.49%	872,330	4.04%	812,105	3.37%	636,295	2.36%	409,830	1.38%	472,385	1.44%	301,400	0.83%
Anglican	494,049	14.17%	574,818	13.29%	646,059	13.37%	680,620	12.67%	1,043,072	14.47%	1,407,994	16.02%	1,636,349	15.77%	1,754,368	15.25%	2,060,720	14.71%	2,409,068	13.21%	2,543,175	11.79%	2,436,375	10.12%	2,188,110	8.11%	2,035,500	6.87%	1,631,845	4.97%	1,134,310	3.12%
Baptist	227,898	6.54%	275,291	6.37%	302,565	6.26%	316,477	5.89%	382,666	5.31%	421,731	4.8%	443,341	4.27%	484,465	4.21%	519,585	3.71%	593,553	3.25%	593,553	2.75%	696,850	2.89%	663,360	2.46%	729,475	2.46%	635,840	1.94%	436,940	1.2%
Lutheran	37,935	1.09%	46,350	1.07%	63,982	1.32%	92,524	1.72%	229,864	3.19%	286,458	3.26%	394,194	3.8%	401,836	3.49%	444,923	3.18%	662,744	3.63%	715,740	3.32%	702,905	2.92%	636,210	2.36%	606,595	2.05%	478,185	1.46%	328,045	0.9%
Protestant, n.i.e. & n.o.s.	37,065	1.06%	35,861	0.83%	29,666	0.61%	42,425	0.79%	66,141	0.92%	81,467	0.93%	81,077	0.78%	41,521	0.36%	35,715	0.25%	51,304	0.28%	21,705	0.1%	137,425	0.57%	720,385	2.67%	641,305	2.16%	647,140	1.97%	514,055	1.42%
Congregationalist	21,829	0.63%	26,900	0.62%	28,157	0.58%	28,293	0.53%	34,054	0.47%	30,730	0.35%	694	0.01%	—N/a	—N/a	—N/a	—N/a	—N/a	—N/a	—N/a	—N/a	145	0%	6,600	0.02%	6,155	0.02%	2,510	0.01%	1,150	0%
Anabaptist	13,146	0.38%	30,065	0.7%	12,911	0.27%	50,380	0.94%	64,732	0.9%	83,944	0.96%	119,529	1.15%	128,432	1.12%	139,113	0.99%	181,942	1%	212,345	0.98%	235,705	0.98%	269,190	1%	243,275	0.82%	201,190	0.61%	158,270	0.44%
Unitarian/Universalist	7,171	0.21%	6,643	0.15%	4,963	0.1%	5,553	0.1%	6,545	0.09%	7,830	0.09%	7,469	0.07%	—N/a	—N/a	3,517	0.03%	15,062	0.08%	21,000	0.1%	17,510	0.07%	19,910	0.07%	20,535	0.07%	—N/a	—N/a	—N/a	—N/a
Adventist	6,179	0.18%	7,211	0.17%	6,354	0.13%	8,058	0.15%	10,417	0.14%	14,200	0.16%	16,026	0.15%	18,485	0.16%	21,398	0.15%	25,999	0.14%	28,585	0.13%	41,605	0.17%	52,360	0.19%	62,880	0.21%	66,940	0.2%	68,935	0.19%
Latter Day Saint	534	0.02%	—N/a	—N/a	—N/a	—N/a	6,891	0.13%	15,982	0.22%	19,717	0.22%	22,132	0.21%	25,328	0.22%	32,888	0.23%	50,016	0.27%	66,635	0.31%	89,870	0.37%	100,770	0.37%	104,745	0.35%	108,665	0.33%	87,725	0.24%
Spiritualist	—N/a	—N/a	—N/a	—N/a	—N/a	—N/a	616	0.01%	674	0.01%	1,558	0.02%	2,263	0.02%	—N/a	—N/a	—N/a	—N/a	—N/a	—N/a	—N/a	—N/a	1,940	0.01%	3,735	0.01%	3,295	0.01%	—N/a	—N/a	—N/a	—N/a
Jehovah's Witness	—N/a	—N/a	—N/a	—N/a	—N/a	—N/a	99	0%	407	0.01%	6,678	0.08%	13,552	0.13%	7,007	0.06%	34,596	0.25%	68,018	0.37%	174,805	0.81%	143,480	0.6%	168,370	0.62%	154,750	0.52%	137,775	0.42%	137,255	0.38%
Reformed	—N/a	—N/a	—N/a	—N/a	—N/a	—N/a	63	0%	1,073	0.01%	2,700	0.03%	2,931	0.03%	—N/a	—N/a	—N/a	—N/a	62,257	0.34%	83,385	0.39%	104,175	0.43%	119,020	0.44%	115,735	0.39%	102,830	0.31%	80,650	0.22%
Pentecostal–Charismatic	—N/a	—N/a	—N/a	—N/a	—N/a	—N/a	43	0%	579	0.01%	7,258	0.08%	26,669	0.26%	57,742	0.5%	95,131	0.68%	143,877	0.79%	220,390	1.02%	339,850	1.41%	438,995	1.63%	372,695	1.26%	480,670	1.46%	399,035	1.1%
United Church	—N/a	—N/a	—N/a	—N/a	—N/a	—N/a	—N/a	—N/a	—N/a	—N/a	8,728	0.1%	2,017,375	19.44%	2,208,658	19.19%	2,867,271	20.47%	3,664,008	20.09%	3,768,805	17.47%	3,758,015	15.6%	3,093,120	11.46%	2,839,125	9.58%	2,007,610	6.11%	1,214,185	3.34%
Total Protestants	1,963,200	56.32%	2,422,285	56.01%	2,711,697	56.11%	3,019,501	56.22%	4,089,978	56.75%	4,997,915	56.87%	5,733,568	55.25%	6,029,112	52.4%	7,173,096	51.2%	8,911,202	48.86%	9,572,155	44.38%	9,777,455	40.6%	9,427,670	34.92%	8,654,870	29.2%	7,265,790	22.12%	5,109,195	14.06%
Total responses	3,485,761	100%	4,324,810	100%	4,833,239	100%	5,371,315	100%	7,206,643	100%	8,788,483	100%	10,376,786	100%	11,506,655	100%	14,009,429	100%	18,238,247	100%	21,568,295	100%	24,083,480	98.93%	26,994,045	98.89%	29,639,060	98.77%	32,852,360	98.14%	36,328,465	98.21%
Total population	3,485,761	100%	4,324,810	100%	4,833,239	100%	5,371,315	100%	7,206,643	100%	8,788,483	100%	10,376,786	100%	11,506,655	100%	14,009,429	100%	18,238,247	100%	21,568,311	100%	24,343,181	100%	27,296,859	100%	30,007,094	100%	33,476,688	100%	36,991,981	100%

==== Anabaptism ====
===== Amish =====
The Amish population in Canada as of 2018, is 5,375. There are Amish settlements in four provinces: Ontario, Prince Edward Island, Manitoba, and New Brunswick. The majority of Old Order settlements is located in the province of Ontario, namely Oxford (Norwich Township) and Norfolk counties. A small community is also established in Bruce County (Huron-Kinloss Township) near Lucknow.

===== Hutterites =====
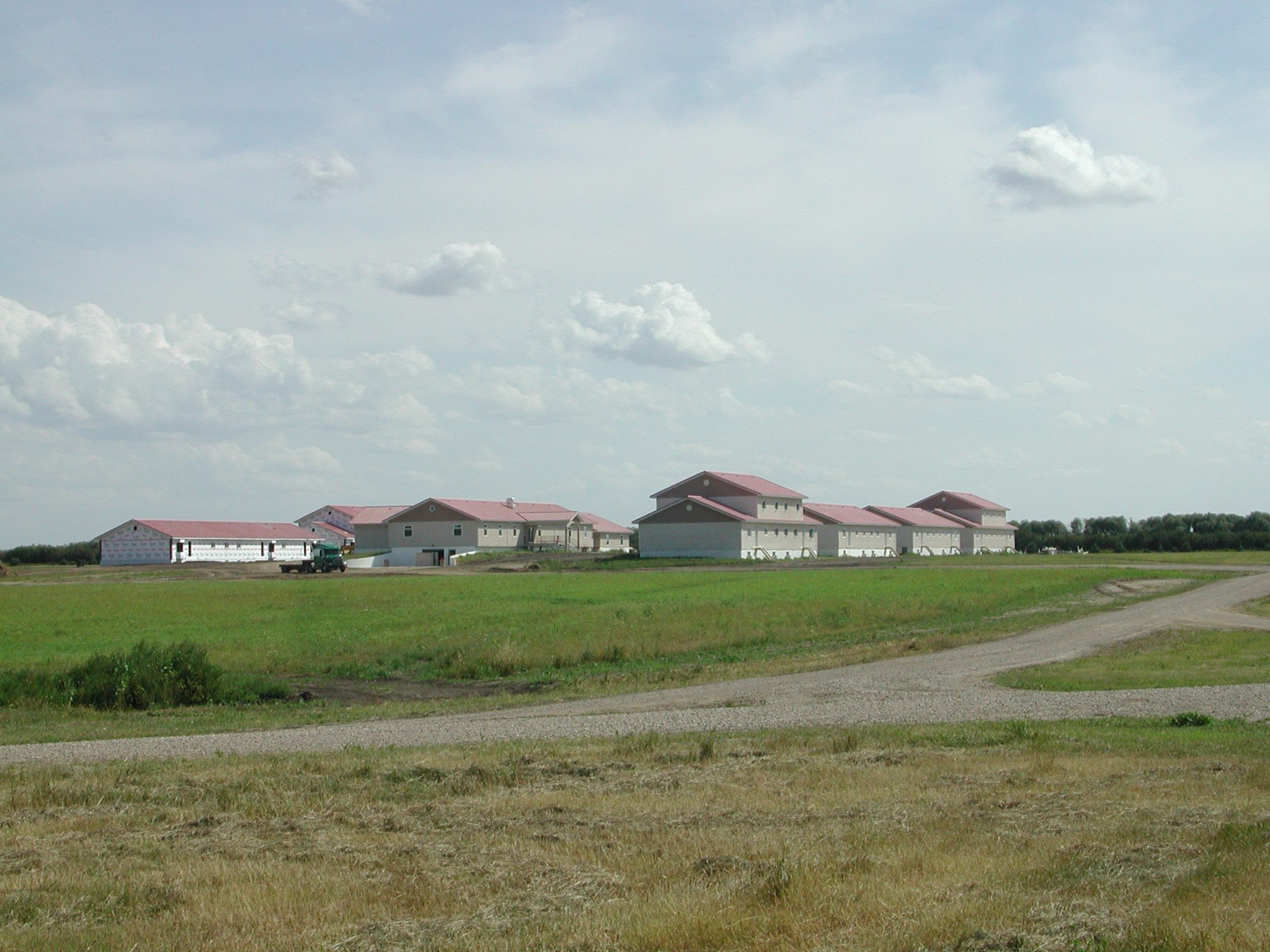
A Hutterite colony in Manitoba

In mid-1870s Hutterites moved from Europe to the Dakota Territory in the United States to avoid military service and other persecutions. During World War I Hutterites suffered from persecutions in the United States because they are pacifist and refused military service. They then moved almost all of their communities to Canada in the Western provinces of Alberta and Manitoba in 1918. In the 1940s, there were 52 Hutterite colonies in Canada.

Today, more than 75% of the world's Hutterite colonies are located in Canada, mainly in Alberta, Manitoba and Saskatchewan, the rest being almost exclusively in the United States. The Hutterite population in North America is about 45,000 people.

===== Mennonites =====
Mennonites first arrived in Canada in 1786 from Pennsylvania, but following Mennonites arrived directly from Europe. The Canadian Conference of Mennonite Brethren Churches had 37,000 members across 250 congregations, and the Mennonite Church Canada had about 35,000 members in 212 congregations in 1998.

=== Catholic ===
The Catholic Church in Canada, under the spiritual leadership of the Pope and the Canadian Conference of Catholic Bishops, has the largest number of adherents to a religion in Canada, with 38.7% of Canadians (13.07 million) reported as Catholics in the 2011 National Household Survey, in 72 dioceses across the provinces and territories, served by about 8,000 priests. It was the first form of Christianity in what is now Canada, arriving in 1497 when John Cabot landed on Newfoundland and raised the Venetian and Papal banners, claiming the land for his sponsor King Henry VII of England, while recognizing the religious authority of the Roman Catholic Church.

=== Eastern Orthodoxy ===
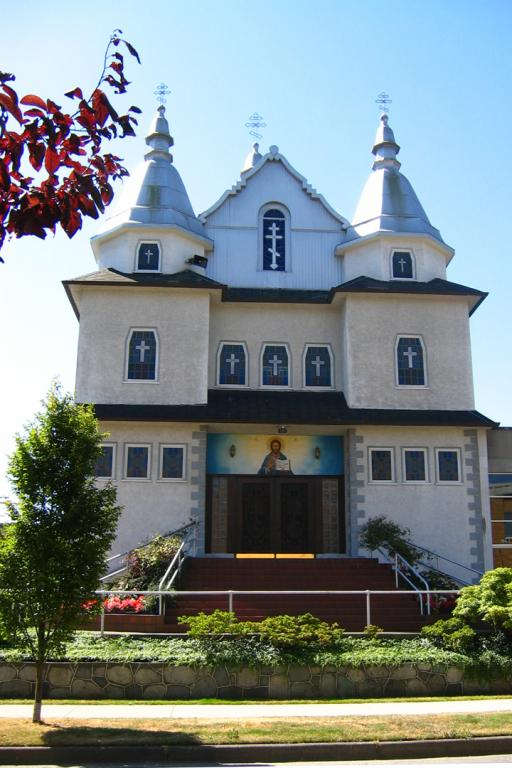
Front of the Holy Trinity Ukrainian Orthodox Cathedral in Vancouver

Adherents of Eastern Orthodox Christianity in Canada belong to several ecclesiastical jurisdictions. Historically, Eastern Orthodoxy was introduced to Canada during the course of 19th century, mainly through emigration of Christians from Eastern Europe and the Middle East. Honoring such diverse heritage, Eastern Orthodoxy in Canada is traditionally organized in accordance with patrimonial jurisdictions of autocephalous Eastern Orthodox Churches, each of them having its own hierarchy with dioceses and parishes. According to 2021 census data, Greek Orthodox community constitutes the largest Eastern Orthodox community in Canada, with 204,025 adherents. It is followed by other communities: Russian Orthodox (28,245), Ukrainian Orthodox (25,975), Serbian Orthodox (25,445), Romanian Orthodox (16,120), Macedonian Orthodox (6,050), Bulgarian Orthodox (3,825), Antiochian Orthodox (2,140) and several other minor communities within Eastern Orthodoxy.

=== Oriental Orthodoxy ===
Adherents of Oriental Orthodox Christianity in Canada also belong to several ethnic communities and ecclesiastical jurisdictions. According to 2011 census data, Coptic Orthodox community constitutes the largest Oriental Orthodox community in Canada, with 16,255 adherents. It is followed by other communities: Armenian Orthodox (13,730), Ethiopian Orthodox (3,025), Syriac Orthodox (3,060) and several other minor communities within Oriental Orthodoxy.

=== Latter-day Saints ===
The Church of Jesus Christ of Latter-day Saints (LDS Church) has had a presence in Canada since its organization in New York State in 1830. Canada has been used as a refuge territory by members of the LDS Church to avoid the anti-polygamy prosecutions by the United States government. The first LDS Church in Canada was established in 1895 in what would become Alberta; it was the first stake of the Church to be established outside the United States. The LDS Church has founded several communities in Alberta.

In 2011, the LDS Church of Canada claimed around 200,000 members; the 2011 Canadian National Household Survey calculates around 100,000. It has congregations in all Canadian provinces and territories and possess at least one temple in six of the ten provinces, including the oldest LDS temple outside the United States. Alberta is the province with the most members of the LDS Church in Canada, having approximately 40% of the total of Canadian LDS Church members and representing 2% of the total population of the province (the National Household survey has Alberta with over 50% of the Canadian Mormons and 1.6% of the province's population), followed by Ontario and British Columbia.

== Ethnic group ==
Christian Canadians Ethnic groups (2001−2021)
	2021		2011		2001	
	Population	%	Population		Population	%
European	14,908,365	76.95%	18,588,045	84.1%	20,309,200	88.87%
African	1,068,800	5.52%	720,230	3.26%	523,715	2.29%
Filipino	898,050	4.64%	497,450	2.25%	300,025	1.31%
Indigenous	849,815	4.39%	889,315	4.02%	804,430	3.52%
Latin American	427,065	2.2%	322,675	1.46%	193,440	0.85%
Chinese	347,245	1.79%	318,935	1.44%	274,350	1.2%
South Asian	245,035	1.26%	185,345	0.84%	124,320	0.54%
Multiracial	147,375	0.76%	87,380	0.4%	39,395	0.17%
Arabs	135,390	0.7%	95,590	0.43%	65,790	0.29%
Koreans	127,190	0.66%	111,350	0.5%	76,235	0.33%
Southeast Asians	104,045	0.54%	92,775	0.42%	55,430	0.24%
West Asians	35,965	0.19%	15,100	0.07%	8,450	0.04%
Japanese	19,235	0.1%	24,190	0.11%	24,605	0.11%
Other Ethnicity	59,755	0.31%	54315	0.25%	52,410	0.23%
Total Christian; Canadian Population	19,373,330	100%	22,102,700	100%	22,851,825	100%

== See also ==
- Demographics of Canada
- History of religion in Canada
- Religion in Canada
- Yearbook of American and Canadian Churches
- Clerico-nationalism
