= Philip Ruh =

Canadian Catholic priest and architect

- Born: 6 August 1883; Bickenholtz, Alsace-Lorraine, German Empire
- Died: 24 October 1962 (aged 79); St. Boniface, Manitoba, Canada
- Education: Belgian Oblate (Missionary Oblates of Mary Immaculate)
- Occupation: Architect
- Practice: church architect
- Buildings: 40 Byzantine Rite churches and several grottos

Philip Ruh, O.M.I. (born Philip Roux; Ukrainian: Філіпп Ру, romanized: Filipp Ru; 6 August 1883 – 24 October 1962) was Catholic priest and church architect. Although he was educated as a Belgian Oblate (Missionary Oblates of Mary Immaculate), he is remembered for his work in Canada with the Eastern Catholic Ukrainian Canadian community building over forty Byzantine Rite churches and several grottos in a unique architectural style that mixed Byzantine, Latin, and modern Canadian influences. The style is often called prairie cathedral, which is a common nickname for several of his churches, even though only two of them are properly cathedrals.

The Ukrainian Catholic Church of the Immaculate Conception in the Rural Municipality of Springfield, Manitoba was designated a National Historic Site of Canada in 1996 as being one of Ruh's most accomplished works. Ukrainian Catholic Church of the Resurrection in Dauphin, Manitoba, was likewise designed a National Historic Site in 1997.

== Priesthood ==
Ruh was born in Bickenholtz, Alsace-Lorraine (then part of the German Empire), to poor parents. When he wasn't at school, he worked in the fields. In his autobiography written two years before his death, he wrote, "There was no time for play except on Sundays after Mass." After leaving school, he worked in the fields until deciding to become a priest. He joined the priesthood in the Oblates order in 1898 and he moved to the Netherlands for training. After completing his novitiate, he studied for another six years in Germany. Then he was sent to be the Oblate missionary to the Ukrainian Catholic immigrants in Canada. Ruh knew nothing about Ukrainians except that they were a Slavic nation. He received additional training in the Ukrainian language and the Eastern Rite. Ruh had his first experience in architecture when he received an assignment to design a path up a hill and a play field for schoolchildren.

Ruh received two more years of training before he was sent to Canada; he arrived in April 1913. There were few clergy for almost 250,000 Ukrainians. Ruh arrived at his new home at the village of Stry, north of the North Saskatchewan River. He remained there until his death at St. Boniface, Manitoba, aged 79.

== Works ==
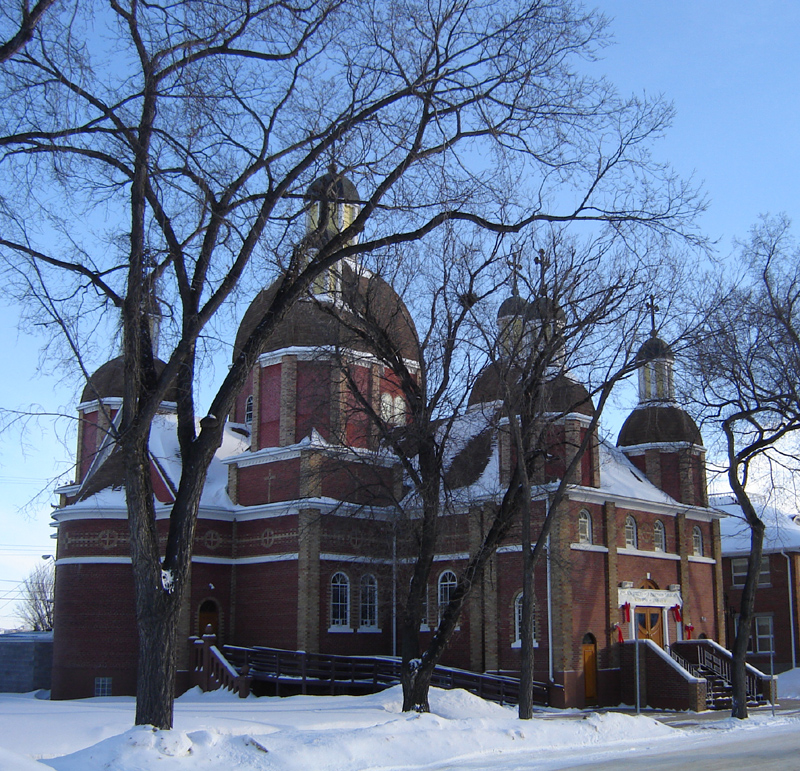
St. George Cathedral, Saskatoon

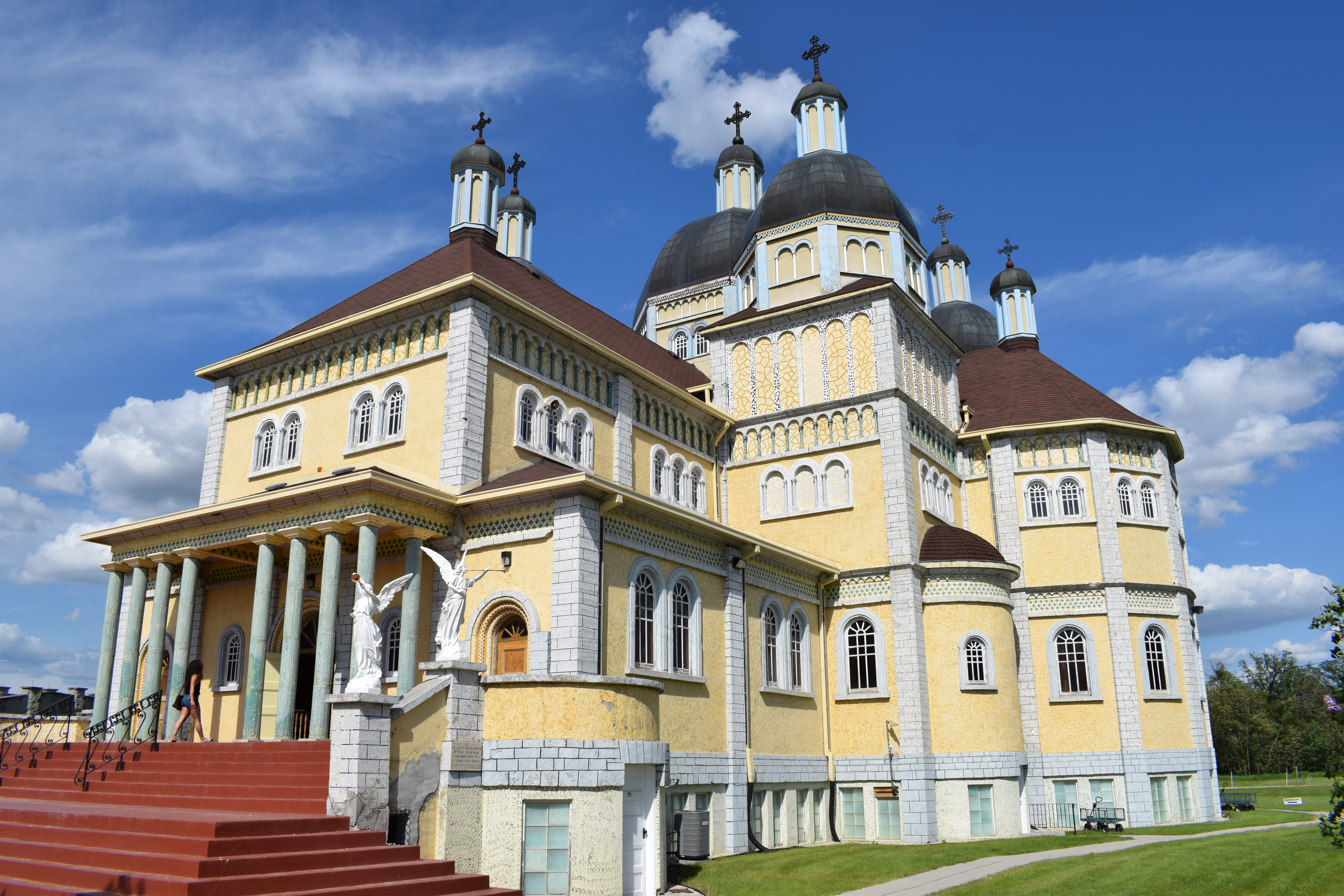
Church of the Immaculate Conception, Cooks Creek

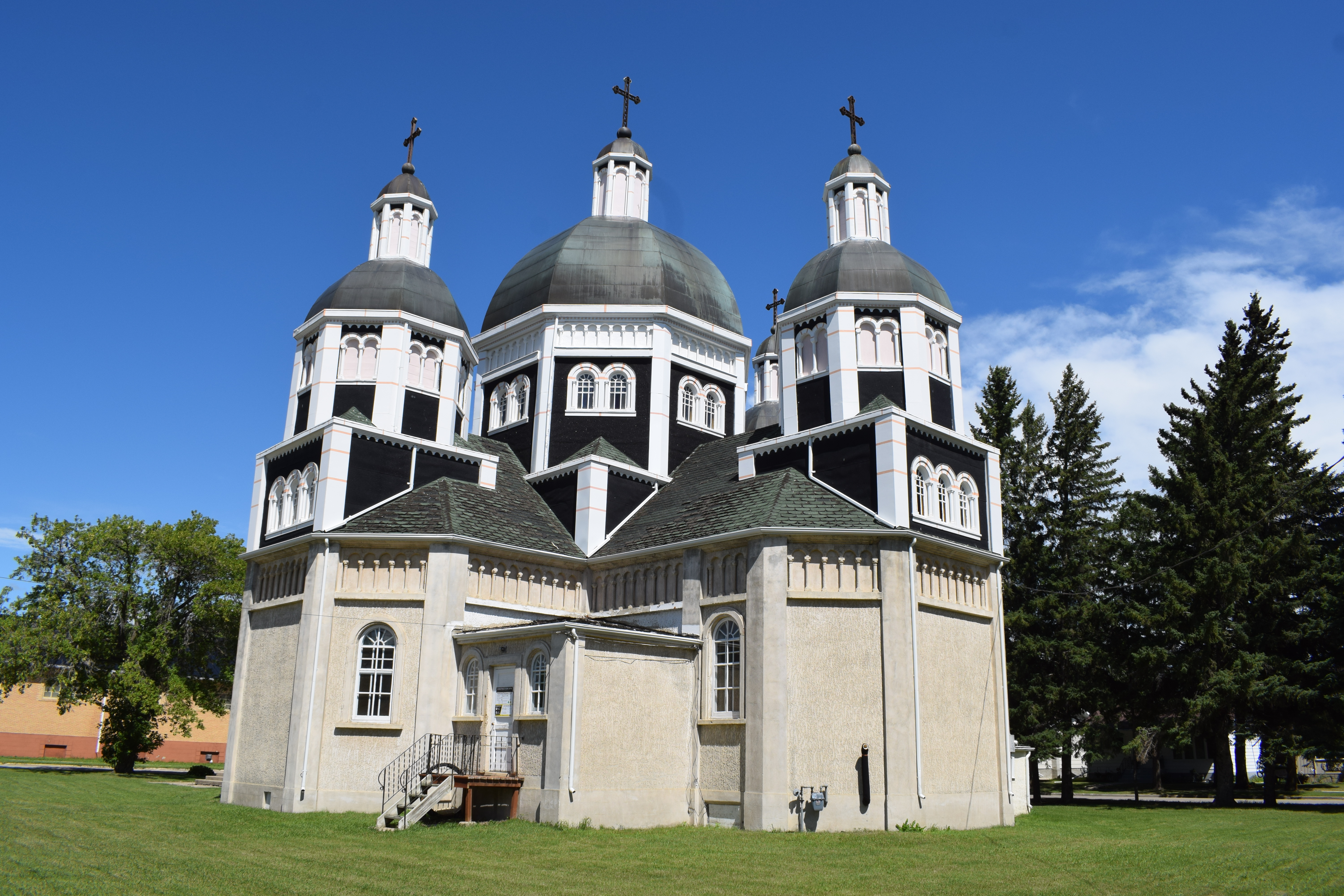
Church of the Resurrection, Dauphin

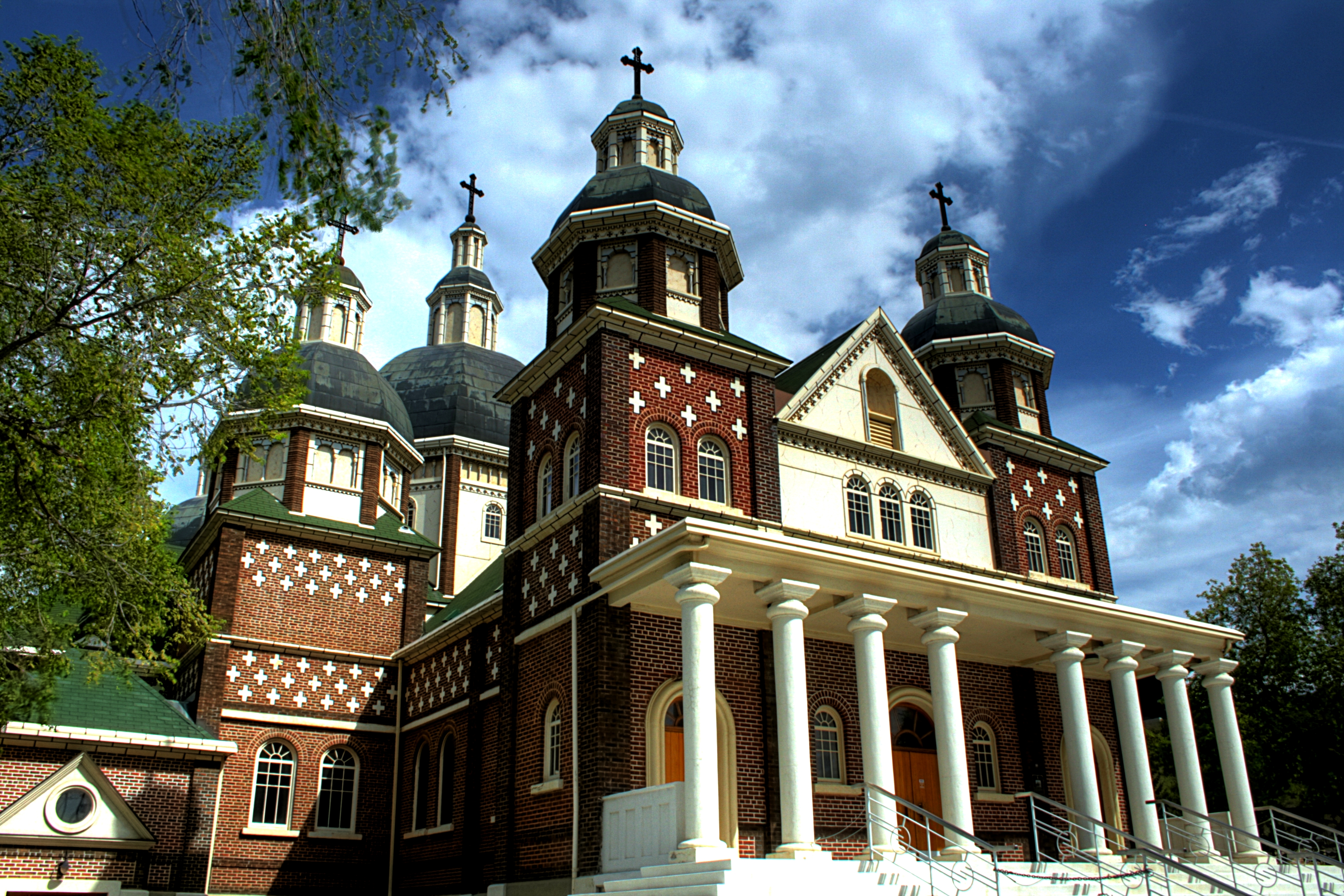
St. Josaphat Cathedral, Edmonton, AB; designed 1938, completed 1947

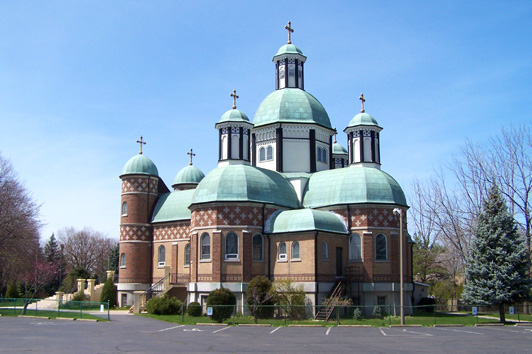
Sts. Cyril and Methodius Ukrainian Catholic Church, St. Catharines, Ontario

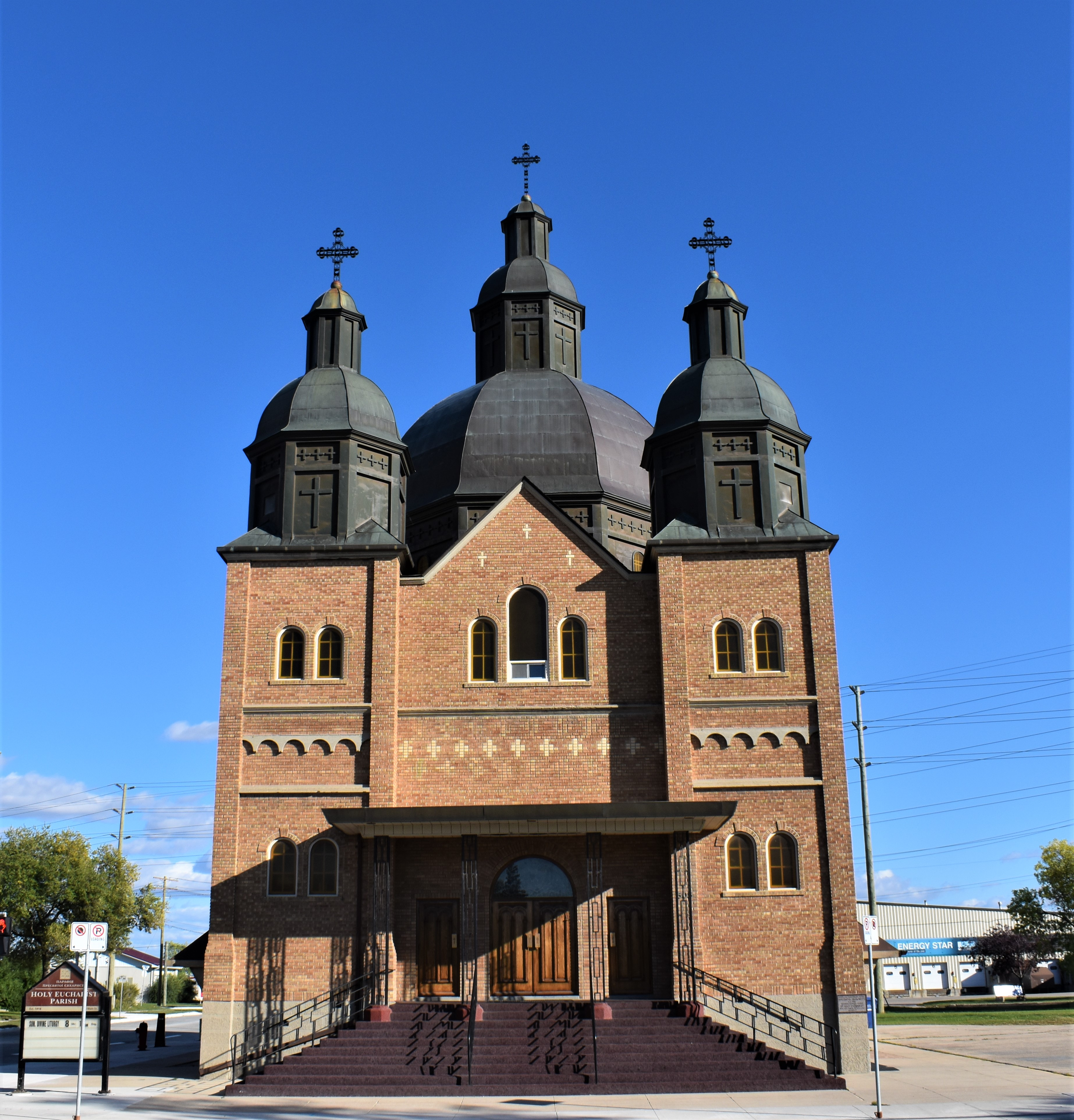
Holy Eucharist Ukrainian Catholic Church, Winnipeg, Manitoba

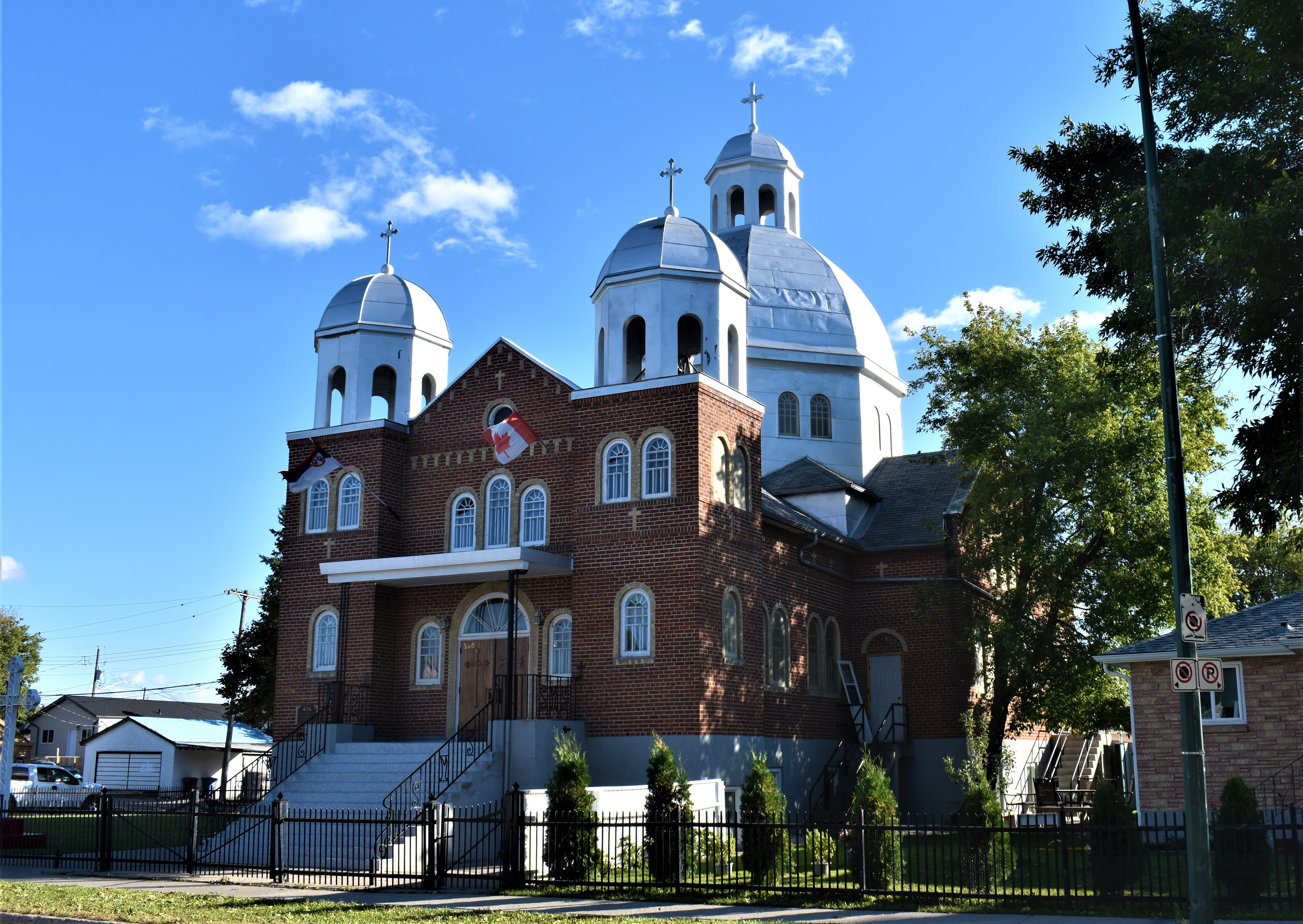
Saint Sava Serbian Orthodox Church, Winnipeg, Manitoba

Blessed Virgin Mary, Grimsby, Ontario, 1940s. Closed in 2010.
- Mountain Road Church of St. Mary's Manitoba 1920s the largest wooden church in Western Canada (burnt 1966);
- Church of the Blessed Mary Virgin, Portage la Prairie (built 1929 and demolished 1983);
- Holy Ascension Winnipeg (1929);
- St Basil the Great Regina, Saskatchewan (1928).
- Church of the Immaculate Conception, Cook's Creek, Manitoba 1930s.
- St. Cyril & Methodius, St. Catharine's, Ontario 1940s.

== External ==
- Saskatchewan Gen Web Project
- "Philip Ruh" at The Canadian Encyclopedia
- Manitoba Historical Society / Dictionary of Manitoba Biography
- Jim Christy, Pete Skov: Prairie cathedrals. Philip Ruh was a tireless missionary who adorned the western landscape with ornat Ukrainian churches. Canadian Geographic, November–December 1996, pp 68 – 76
