= St. Josaphat Cathedral =

Ukrainian Greek Catholic cathedral in Edmonton, Alberta, Canada

Coordinates: 53.5544°N 113.4897°W

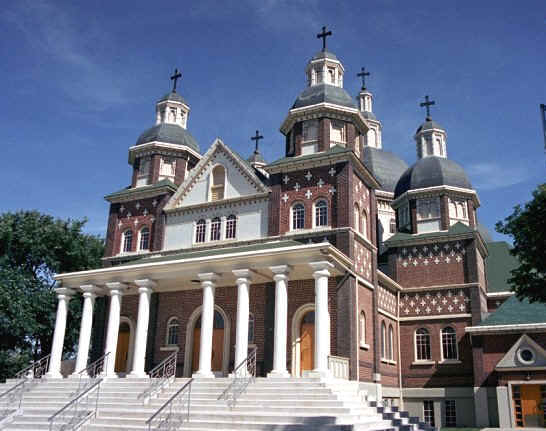
- St. Josaphat Cathedral
- Address: 10825 97 Street NW; Edmonton, Alberta; T5H 2M4
- Country: Canada
- Denomination: Catholic Church
- Sui iuris church: Ukrainian Greek Catholic Church

History
- Status: Cathedral

Architecture
- Heritage designation: Provincial Historic Resource - 1983
- Architect: Phillip Ruh
- Style: Prairie Cathedral (first of this style)
- Groundbreaking: 1939
- Completed: 1947
- Construction cost: $250,000 ($3.99 million in 2025 dollars)

Administration
- Diocese: Ukrainian Catholic Eparchy of Edmonton

St. Josaphat Cathedral is a Ukrainian Catholic cathedral in McCauley, Edmonton, Alberta, one of the best examples of Byzantine Rite church architecture in Canada. It is the seat of the Ukrainian Catholic Eparchy of Edmonton, and has been a cathedral (the seat of a bishop) since 1948. Occupying 18 city lots in the McCauley neighbourhood, the cathedral has been recognized for its heritage significance and "is distinguished by it seven domes, columned entry portico, and red brick veneer embellished with darker brick pilasters and inlaid cream coloured crosses.

== History ==
The parish was established by the Order of Saint Basil the Great in 1902, at first without a permanent home. A small log church was built in 1904 under the leadership of the Reverend Sozont Dydyk.

== Architecture ==
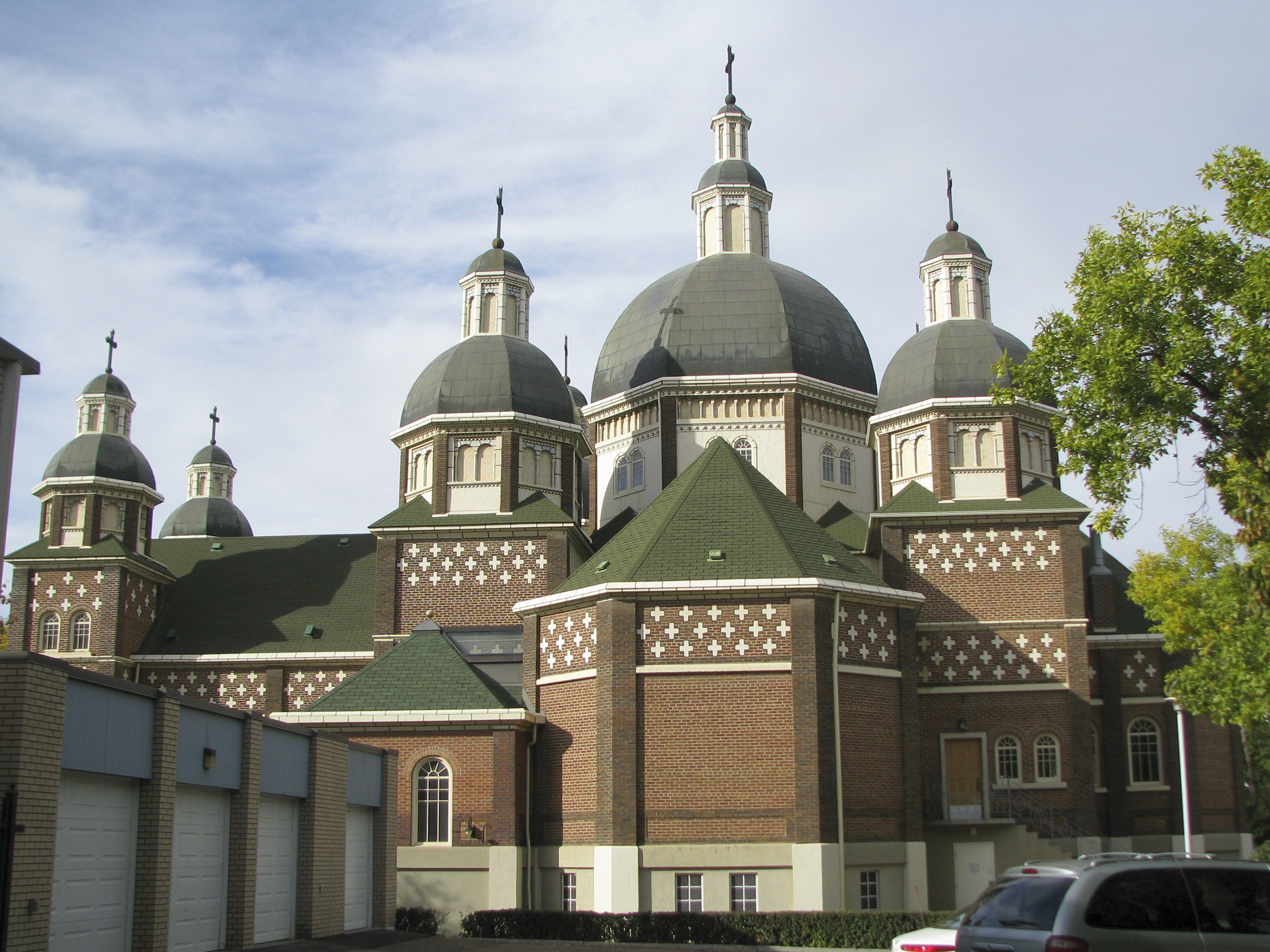
View of the side of the cathedral, from the south

The current building was designed in 1938 by the Reverend Philip Ruh, an Oblate missionary from Belgium who intensively studied the Byzantine Rite building designs of Ukraine so that the building would be culturally acceptable to the parishioners. His design mixes elements of Ukrainian Baroque with Western European influences, to produce a uniquely Canadian style dubbed "Prairie Cathedral". If not for the height restrictions at the time of construction because of the Edmonton City Centre Airport (which also affected the Ukrainian Orthodox Cathedral of St. John the Baptist), an overall more properly proportioned church building would be at least 4-5m taller. Nevertheless, this cathedral is considered to be "the most elaborate Ukrainian Church in Alberta" and "one of the finest examples of Ukrainian-Canadian church architecture". Ruh also designed St. George Cathedral in Saskatoon and the Ukrainian Catholic Church of the Immaculate Conception in Cooks Creek (Springfield), Manitoba, which was designated a National Historic Site of Canada in 1996.

Construction lasted from 1939 to 1947. The building became a cathedral when Edmonton was selected as the seat of a new exarchate headed by a bishop. The first bishop was the Most Reverend Neil N. Savaryn, appointed "Bishop Ordinary for the Apostolic Exarchate of Edmonton serving Alberta and British Columbia".

Starting in 1951 the process of painting the interior murals, frescos, and icons began under the leadership of Professor Julian Bucmaniuk, a well-known muralist. In 1968 the iconostasis was built. St. Josaphat Cathedral was designated as a Provincial Historic Resource by the province of Alberta in 1983, and as a Municipal Historic Resource by the City of Edmonton in 2015.
