= Bishop of Edmonton =

Bishop of Edmonton may refer to:

== Canada ==
- Anglican Bishop of Edmonton (Alberta), of the Anglican Church of Canada
- Archbishop of Edmonton, of the (Latin) Catholic Church
- Bishop of Edmonton (Ukrainian), of the Ukrainian Greek Catholic Church
- Archbishop of Edmonton and Western Canada, of the Ukrainian Orthodox Church of Canada

== United Kingdom ==
- Bishop of Edmonton (London), an area bishop of the Church of England in the Diocese of London
