= Church of the Immaculate Conception (Cooks Creek, Manitoba) =

Ukrainian Greek Catholic church in Manitoba, Canada

Ukrainian Catholic Church of the Immaculate Conception
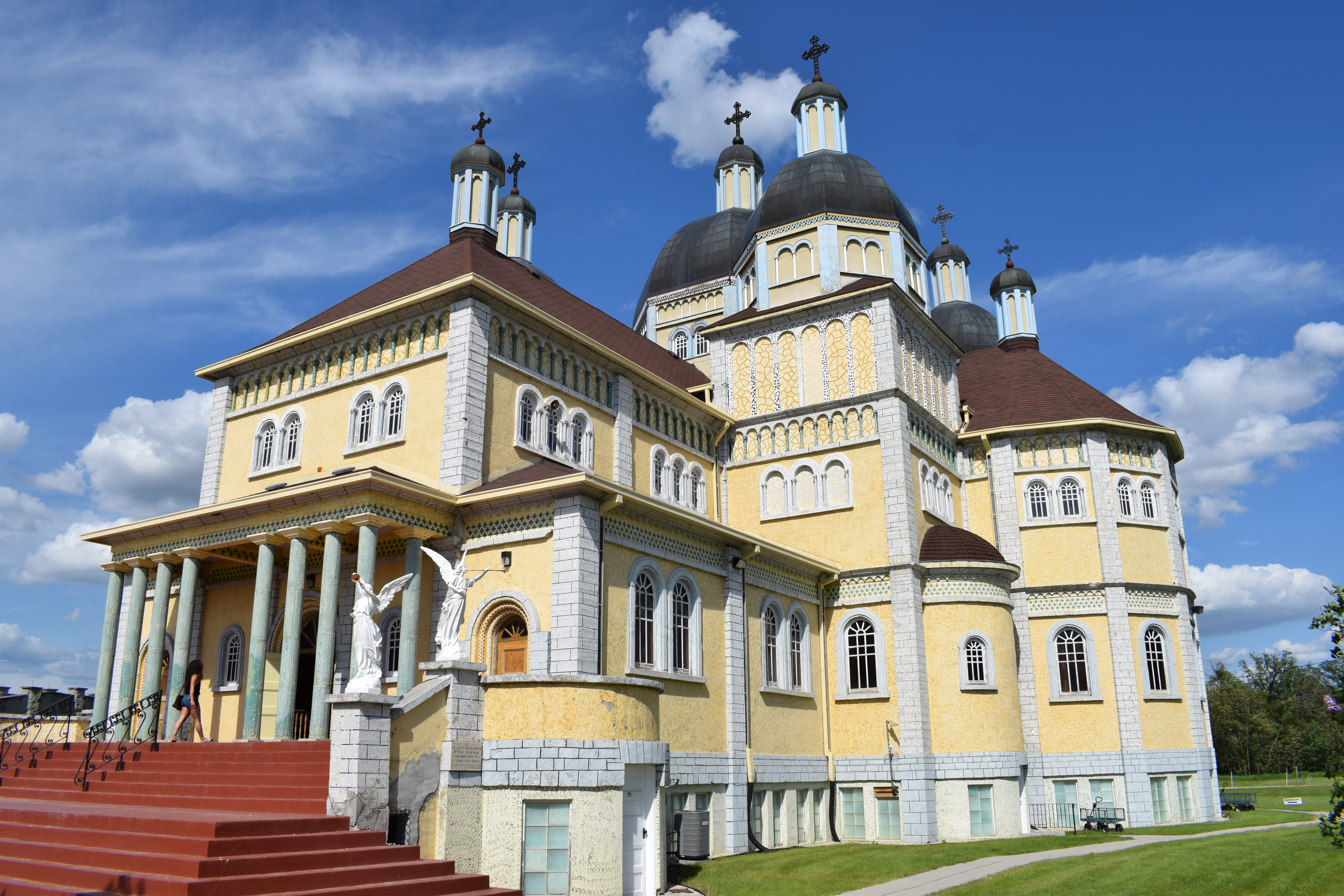
- Ukrainian Catholic Church of the Immaculate Conception
- 50°00′14″N 96°46′22″W
- Location: Cooks Creek, Manitoba
- Country: Canada
- Denomination: Catholic Church
- Sui iuris church: Ukrainian Greek Catholic Church
- Website: www.immaculatechurch.ca

Administration
- Province: Ukrainian Catholic Archeparchy of Winnipeg

The Church of the Immaculate Conception is a Ukrainian Greek Catholic church located in Cooks Creek, Manitoba. The church was constructed from 1930 to 1938 by the Ukrainian Canadian priest and architect Philip Ruh. It was designated a Manitoba Provincial Heritage Site in 1986 and a National Historic Site in 1997.

== History ==
The Cook's Creek Parish of the Ukrainian Greek Catholic Church was established in 1929. Philip Ruh, a Ukrainian Canadian Catholic priest and architect, was appointed the parish priest and tasked with designing a church that would replace two smaller churches in the area. Construction of the church began in 1930 and was finished in 1938, whereupon work on the church's interiors began. The church was consecrated in 1952. A grotto modeled after that of Sanctuary of Our Lady of Lourdes in France was constructed next to the church in 1954.

=== Preservation ===
The Church of the Immaculate Conception was named a Manitoba Provincial Heritage Site on 1 May 1986 and then subsequently a National Historic Site on 22 September 1997. It was added to the Canadian Register of Historic Places on 14 July 2009.

== Architecture ==
The Church of the Immaculate Conception was designed by Ruh in an eclectic style combining elements from Kievan Rus', Byzantine, and Gothic architecture. Architectural historians Basil Rotoff, Roman Yereniuk, and Stella Hryniuk note that the profile of the church overall resembles Kievan Rus' churches found in eastern Ukraine but is punctuated with Romanesque windows and a Gothic portico.

The church was built from brick to a cruciform plan, measuring 140 by 100 feet (43 m × 30 m). It has nine domes and cupolas above the cross's arms, flanking the arms, and above the center of the church.

== Sources ==
- Rotoff, Basil; Yereniuk, Roman; Hryniuk, Stella (2010). Monuments to Faith: Ukrainian Churches in Manitoba. University of Manitoba Press. ISBN 9780887553455.
- Kalman, Harold (1994). A History of Canadian Architecture. Oxford University Press. ISBN 9780195411034.
