= Sts. Cyril and Methodius Ukrainian Catholic Church (St. Catharines) =

Ukrainian Greek Catholic church in St. Catharines, Canada

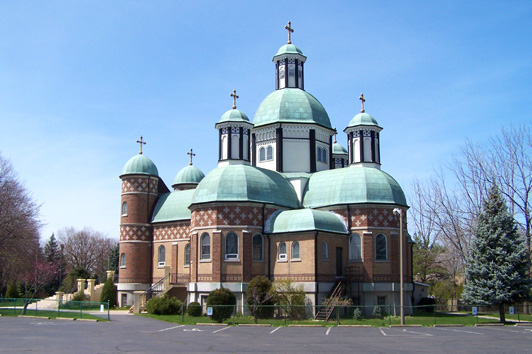
- Sts. Cyril and Methodius Ukrainian Catholic Church
- 43°10′27.7″N 79°13′53″W
- Location: 14 Rolls Ave, St. Catharines, ON L2N 1W1, Canada
- Country: Canada
- Denomination: Catholic Church
- Sui iuris church: Ukrainian Greek Catholic Church

Architecture
- Heritage designation: Municipal (1997)
- Architect(s): Reverend Philip Ruh, O.M.I.
- Style: Byzantine Revival
- Groundbreaking: 1944
- Completed: 1946

The Sts. Cyril and Methodius Ukrainian Catholic Church is a Ukrainian Greek Catholic church located in St. Catharines, Ontario. It was designed by the German priest and architect Philip Ruh.

In 1943, the property for Sts. Cyril and Methodius was purchased for $600. The church was constructed between 1944 and 1946. It was consecrated in 1950.

In 1997 the church was granted heritage status by the City of St. Catharines, one of five St. Catharines churches so honoured.

== Gallery ==
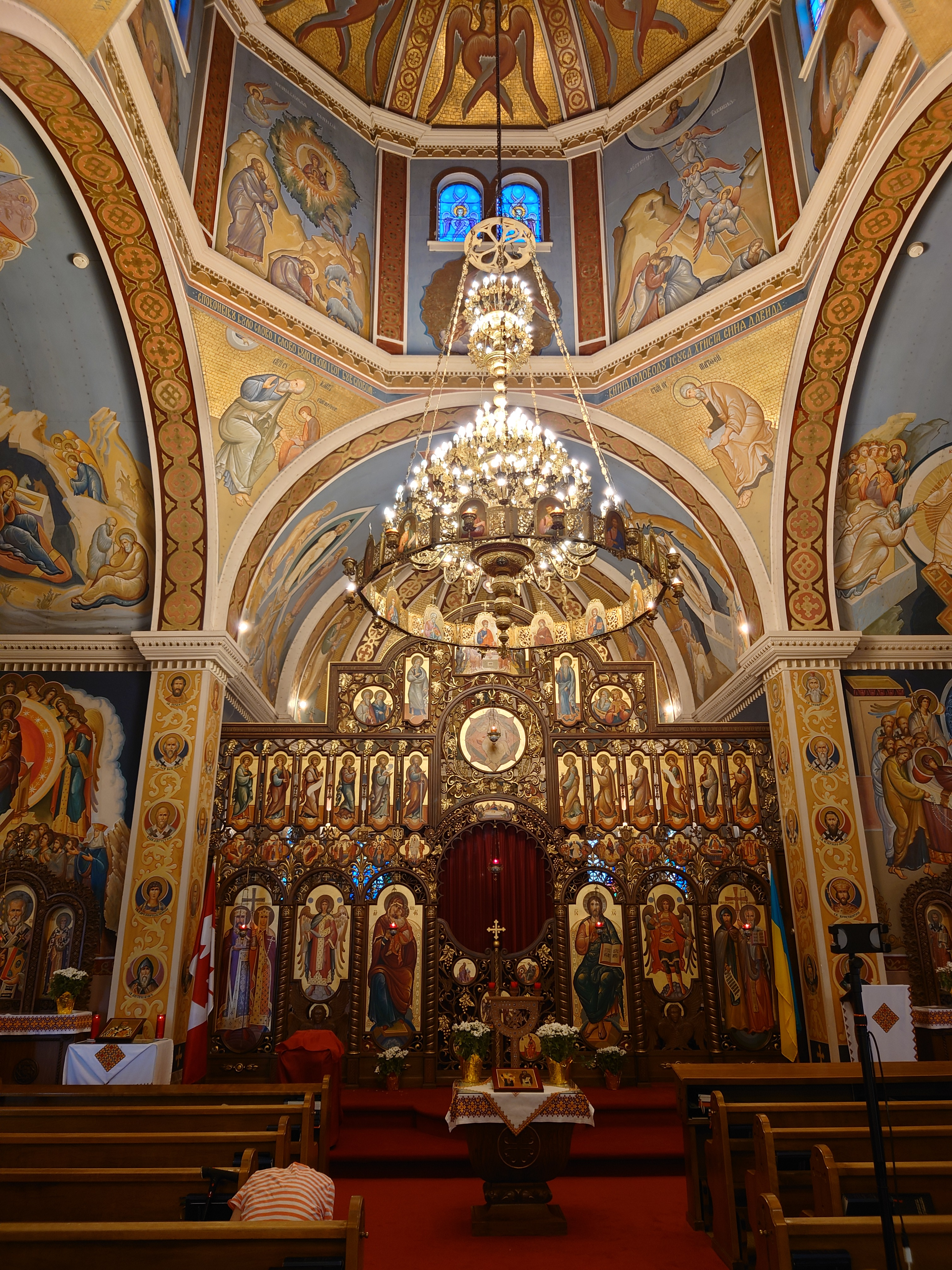
Church interior

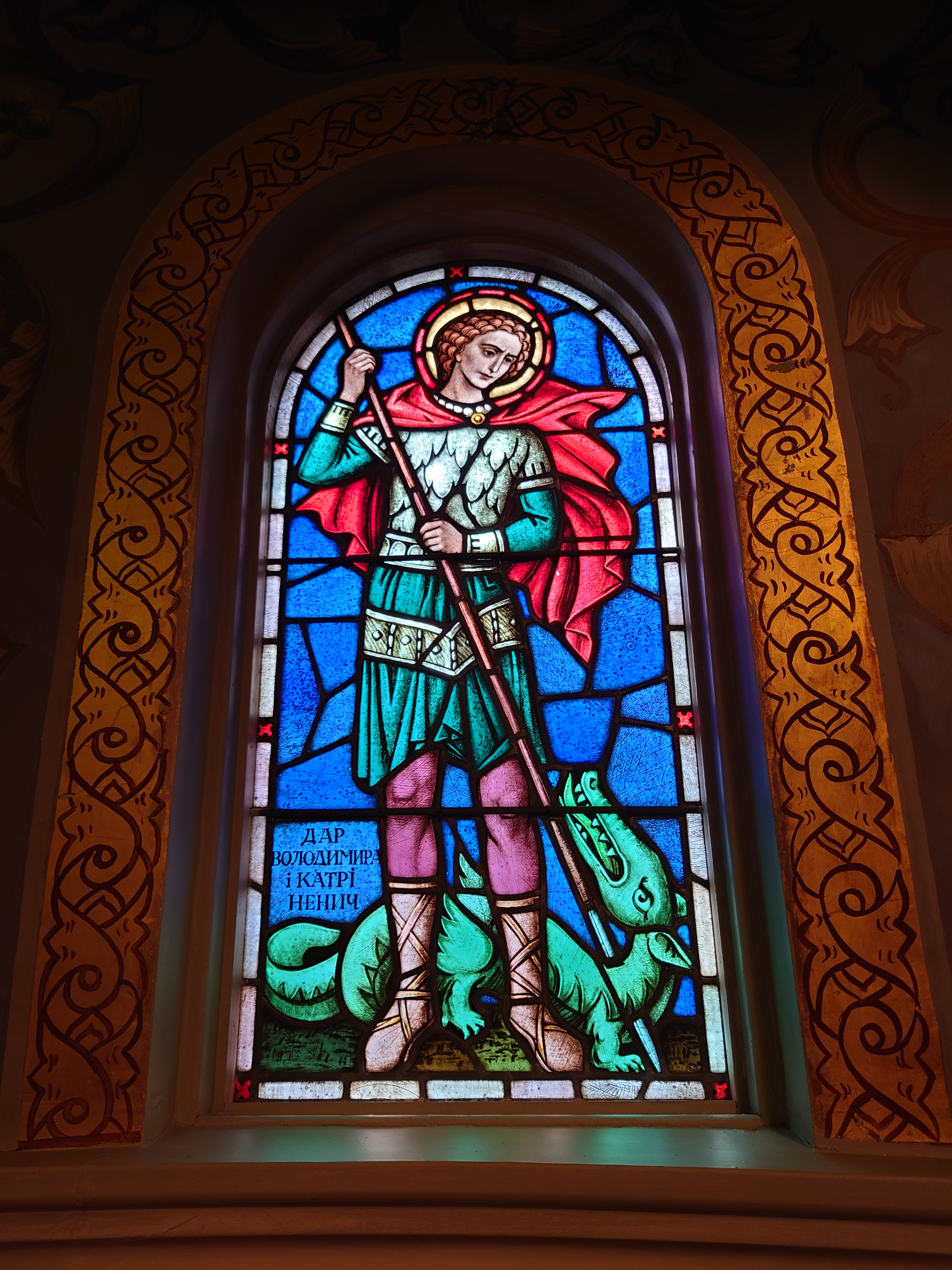
One of the stained-glass windows

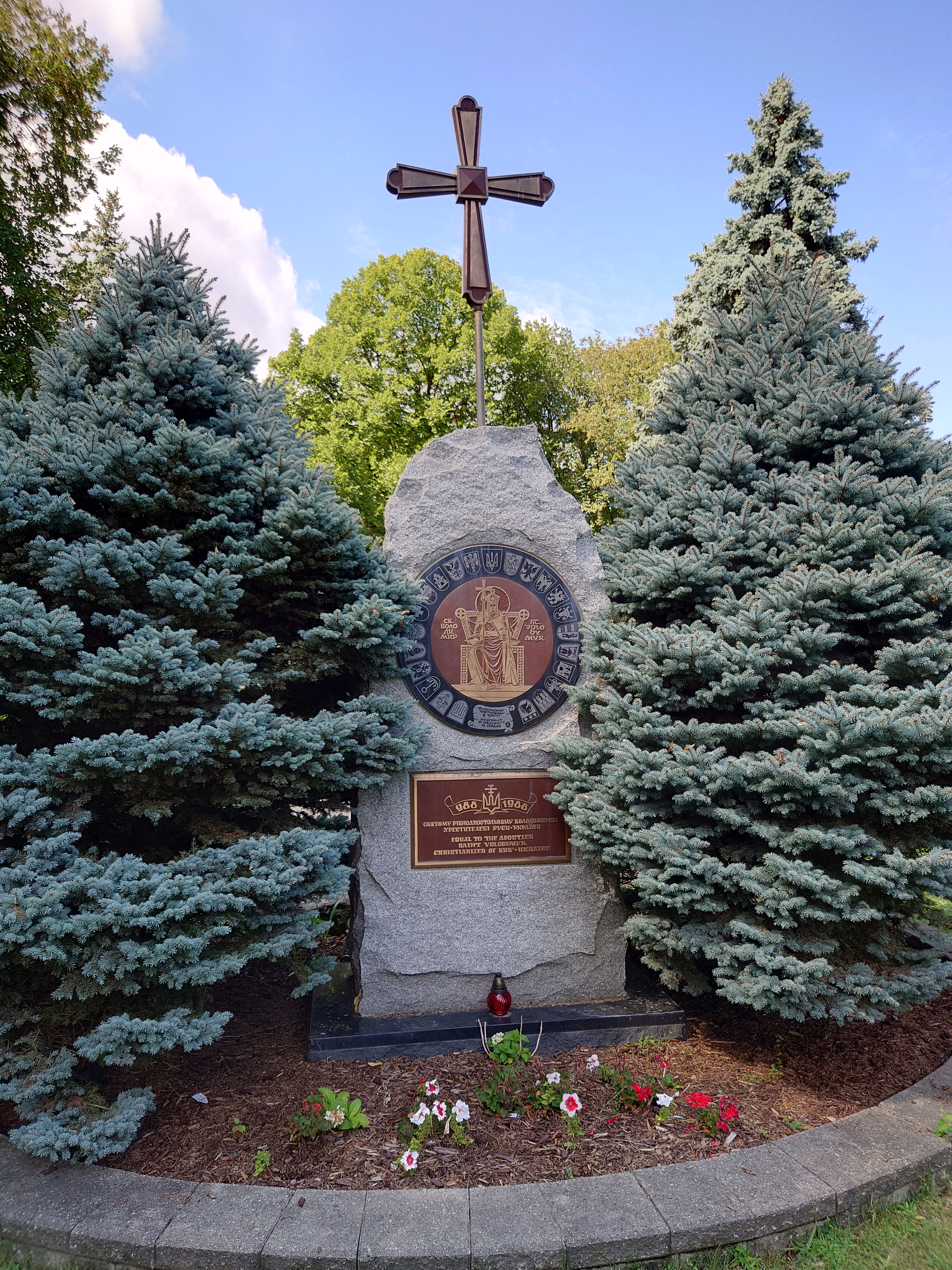
Monument to St. Volodymyr

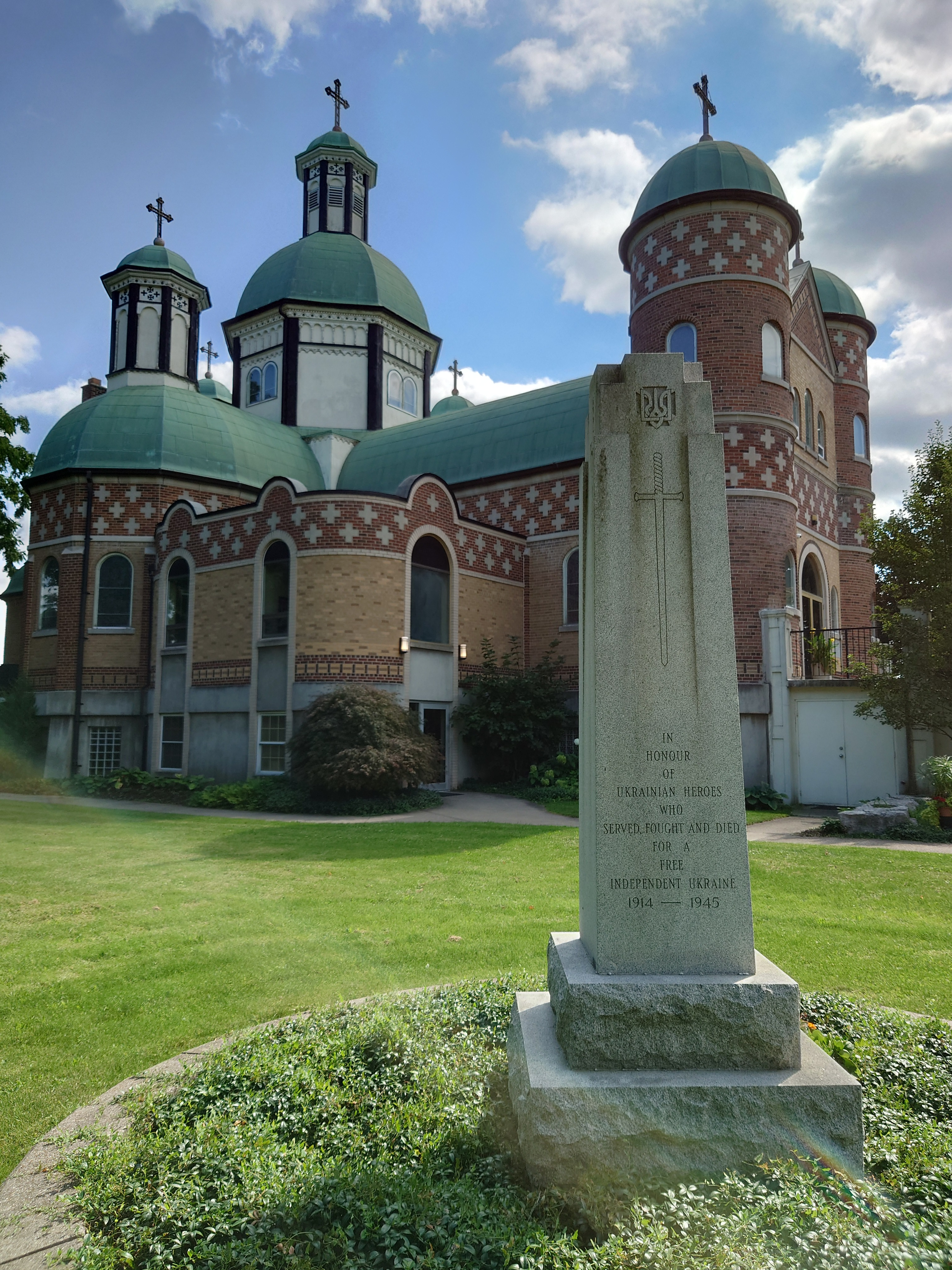
Monument to Ukrainian soldiers
