= Cathedral of St. George (Saskatoon) =

Cathedral in Pleasant Hill, Canada

Coordinates: 52.1274°N 106.6883°W

Ukrainian Catholic Cathedral of St. George
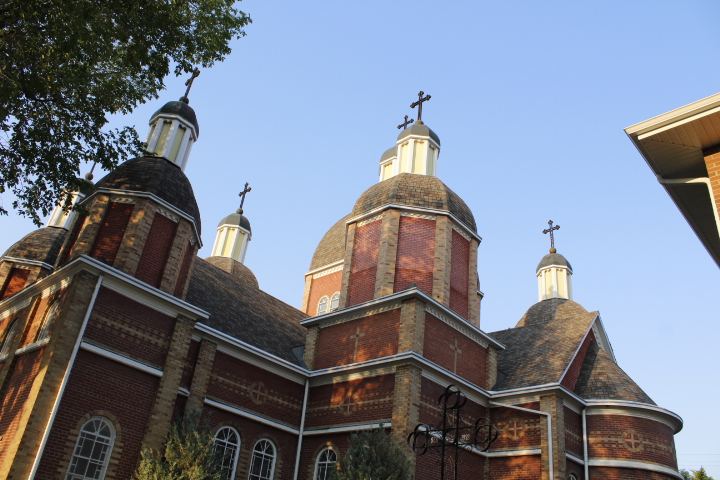
- Ukrainian Catholic Cathedral of St. George (Saskatoon)

Religion
- Affiliation: Ukrainian Catholic

Location
- Location: 214 Avenue M South; Saskatoon, Saskatchewan; S7M 2K4
- Interactive map of Ukrainian Catholic Cathedral of St. George

Architecture
- Architects: The Very Reverend Philip Ruh, O.M.I.
- Style: Byzantine-style basilica
- Completed: 1923

Website
- Ukrainian Catholic Cathedral of St. George -- Saskatoon, Saskatchewan

The Ukrainian Catholic Cathedral of St. George (Ukrainian: Собор святого Юрія) was designed by architect the Very Reverend Philip Ruh, O.M.I. in 1923. It is located in Pleasant Hill, Core Neighbourhoods SDA, Saskatoon, Saskatchewan, Canada and is the Episcopal See of the Bishop of the Saskatoon Eparchy.

== History ==
The organizational meeting of the Ukrainian Catholic Parish of St. George took place on September 29, 1912 at which the first Executive was elected. In the same year 40 persons enrolled as members.

Construction of the present church, the second church of the parish, begun in 1939 and was completed in 1943. The church is a massive mason structure which stands on a high concrete basement measures 104 x 90 feet (27 m); the intersecting arms are 30 feet (9.1 m) wide. Its architectural plan is a four column cruciform Byzantine domed basilica with north, south and east apses, and seven domes. The central area of the church is dominated by a large octagonal dome which is reinforced by the arcades of the vaulted ceilings and is supported by four massive octagonal columns. Each side of the octagonal drum supporting the dome has two arched windows which collectively illuminate the dome.

In 1950 to 1955 the icons and artistic decoration of the church were done by Theodore Baran, member of St. George's parish. The Iconostasis was added in 1991.

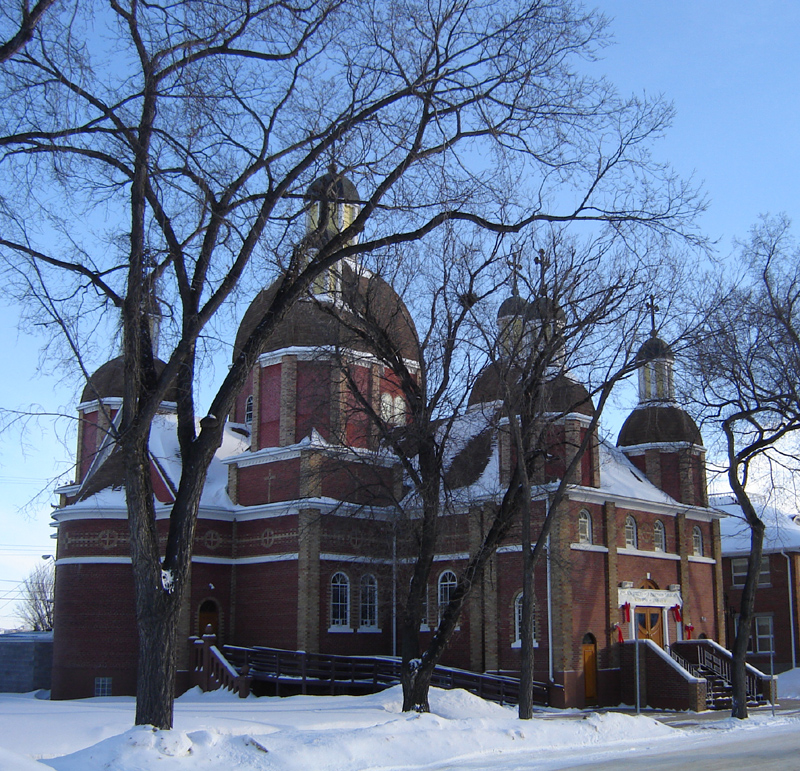

On various occasions, the cathedral has also been visited by eminent clergy of the Ukrainian and Roman Catholic Churches and other Christian Churches.

== Clergy ==
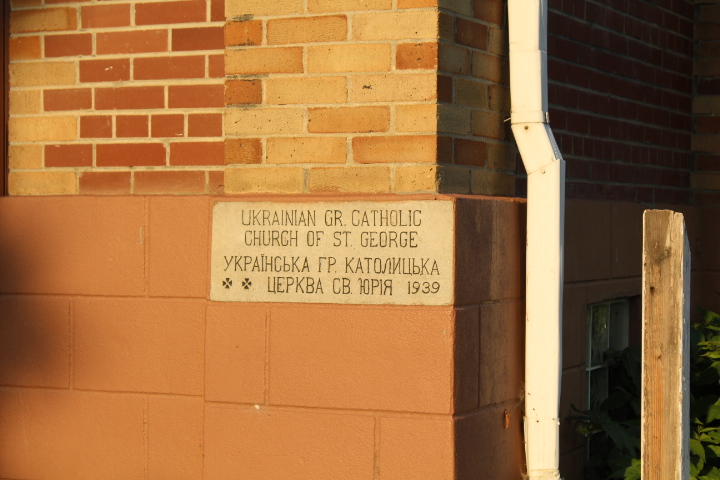

Between 1992 and 2010 the parish priest was Rt. Rev. Vladimir Mudri, STL, JCOD. Currently The Parish Priest is Rev. Ivan Nahachewski.
