= Holy Trinity Ukrainian Orthodox Cathedral =

Church building in British Columbia, Canada

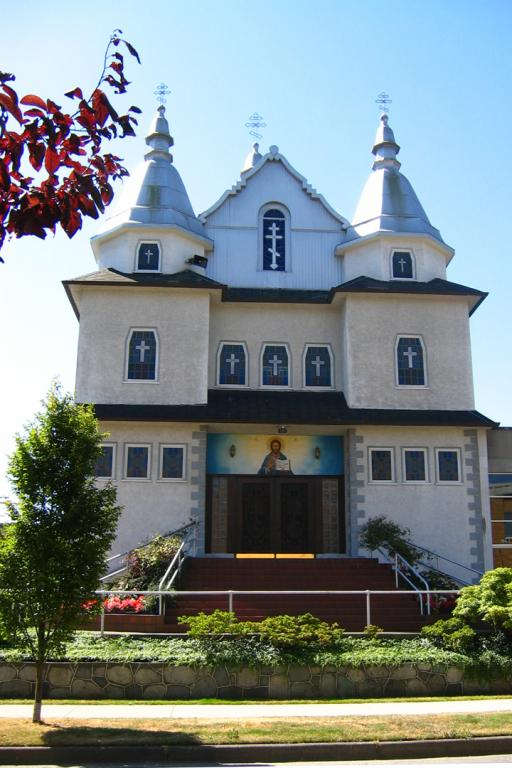

Religion
- Affiliation: Ukrainian Orthodox Church of Canada
- District: Western Diocese
- Ecclesiastical or organisational status: Cathedral
- Status: Open

Location
- Interactive map of Holy Trinity Ukrainian Orthodox Cathedral
- Coordinates: 49.26179°N 123.10202°W

Architecture
- Architect: Sergius Timoshenko

Website
- http://www.uocvancouver.com/

Holy Trinity Ukrainian Orthodox Cathedral is a Ukrainian Orthodox Cathedral in Vancouver, British Columbia, Canada, on East 10th Avenue just west of Main Street.

== History ==
The Holy Trinity Ukrainian Orthodox Parish was established in Vancouver on May 9, 1937. The first Holy Liturgy was held on July 18, 1937, at the Ukrainian National Home. The following year, a fund was established for the building of a church. The church was designed by Ukrainian-American architect Sergius Timoshenko. The cross for the main cupola was blessed by Rev. Stephen Symchych on September 11, 1949.

At Easter 1950 the first Divine Liturgy was served in the yet-unfinished church. In the ensuing years the church was completed and decorated according to the Orthodox tradition.

In 1970 the parish commenced planning and fundraising for the building of a two-level Ukrainian Orthodox Centre attached to the church and officially opened on June 17, 1973. The auditorium and mezzanine dining room are used for church and private events.

In December 1977, Vancouver City Council designated the church an architectural heritage building, and an engraved plaque was placed on its exterior. It is evaluated as "significant" (B group) and legally protected by city bylaws. In 1975 the church was designated as a sobor by Rt. Rev. Archbishop Andrew on behalf of the Ukrainian Greek-Orthodox Church of Canada (renamed Ukrainian Orthodox Church of Canada—UOCC—by an Act of Parliament in 1990). In 1983 the church was designated a cathedral.

The church elders and sisterhood are involved with the care and maintenance of the church, along with their principal role of assisting with the conduct of church services.

The Parish is known in Vancouver for its monthly Friday Night Ukrainian Suppers (or "Perogy Night in Vancouver").

== Congregation ==
The congregation comprises about 130 members. There is a mixture of Ukrainian and English-speaking parishioners, including a number of recent Ukrainian immigrants.

== See also ==
- Ukrainian Orthodox Church of Canada
- Archbishop of Edmonton and Western Canada
- List of Cathedrals in Canada
