= Bickenholtz =

- Commune
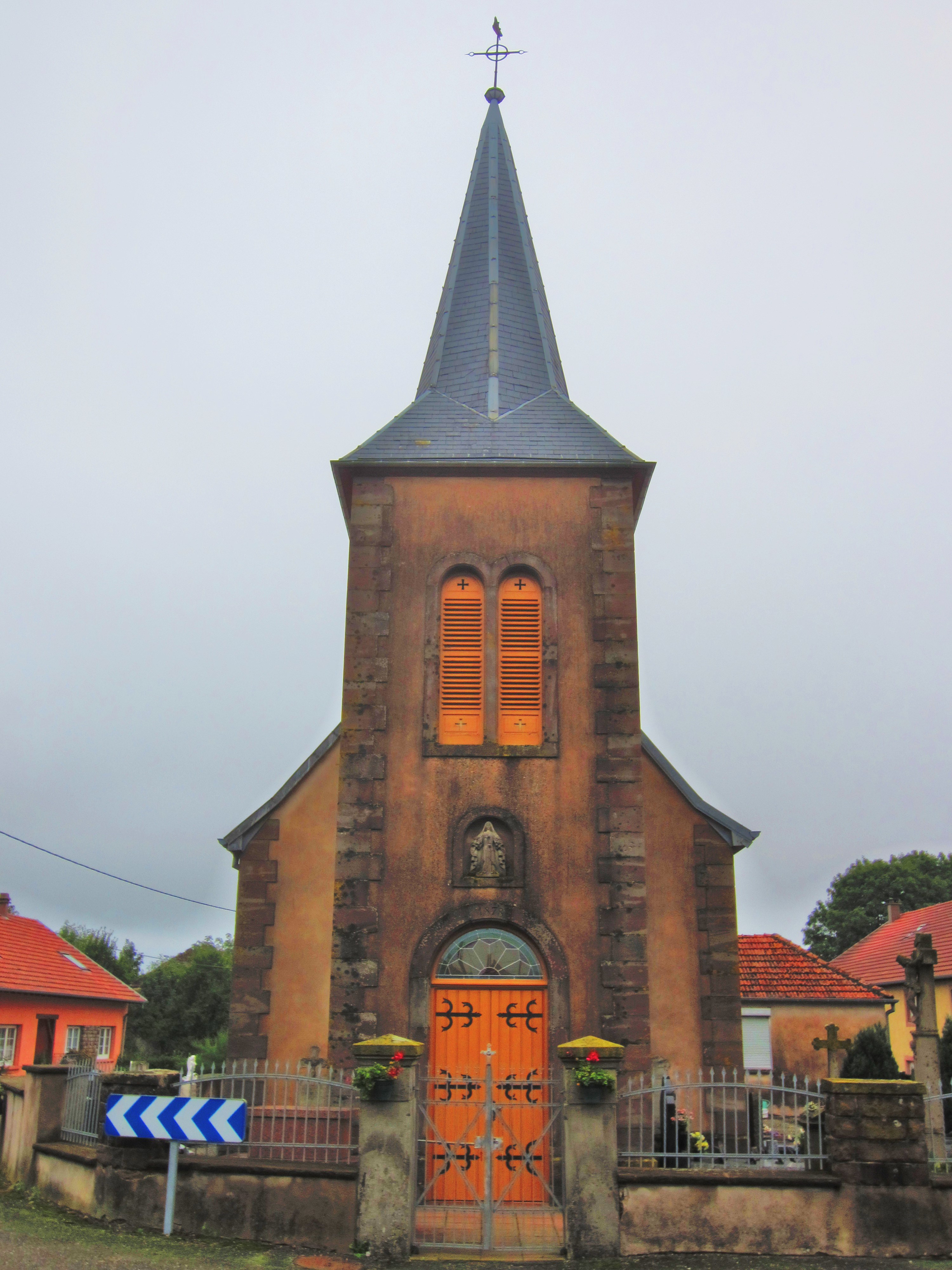
- The church in Bickenholtz

- Coat of arms
- Location of Bickenholtz
- Location within France Location within Grand Est
- Coordinates: 48°48′18″N 7°09′57″E
- Country: France
- Region: Grand Est
- Department: Moselle
- Arrondissement: Sarrebourg-Château-Salins
- Canton: Sarrebourg
- Intercommunality: Sarrebourg - Moselle Sud

Government
  - Mayor (2020–2026): Sylvain Holtzinger
- Area^{1}: 2.46 km^{2} (0.95 sq mi)
- Elevation: 335 m (1,099 ft)
- Highest elevation: 334 m (1,096 ft)
- Lowest elevation: 298 m (978 ft)
- Population (2023): 86
  - Density: 35/km^{2} (91/sq mi)
- Time zone: UTC+01:00 (CET)
  - Summer (DST): UTC+02:00 (CEST)
- INSEE/Postal code: 57080 /57635
- ^{1} French Land Register data, which excludes lakes, ponds, glaciers > 1 km^{2} (0.386 sq mi or 247 acres) and river estuaries.

Bickenholtz (French pronunciation: [bikənɔlts]; German: Bickenholz) is a commune in the Moselle department in Grand Est in northeastern France.

In the 18th century there was a Mennonite commune there and one at Buchenhof, and another at Schwabenhoff.

== Population ==
Historical population
Year	Pop.	±% p.a.
1968	92	—
1975	80	−1.98%
1982	75	−0.92%
1990	77	+0.33%
1999	63	−2.21%
2007	73	+1.86%
2012	77	+1.07%
2017	81	+1.02%
2023	86	+1.00%
Source: INSEE

== See also ==
- Communes of the Moselle department
