= Ukrainian Orthodox Eparchy of Western Canada =

Edmonton and Western Canada

Location
- Ecclesiastical province: Ukrainian Orthodox Church of Canada

Statistics
- Churches: ≈60

Information
- Cathedral: St. John, Edmonton; Holy Trinity, Vancouver

Current leadership
- Bishop: Bishop Ilarion (Roman Rudnyk)

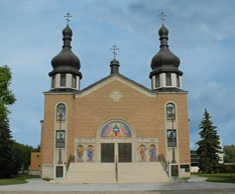
St. John Cathedral (Edmonton) is the primary seat of the Archbishop of Edmonton and Western Canada.

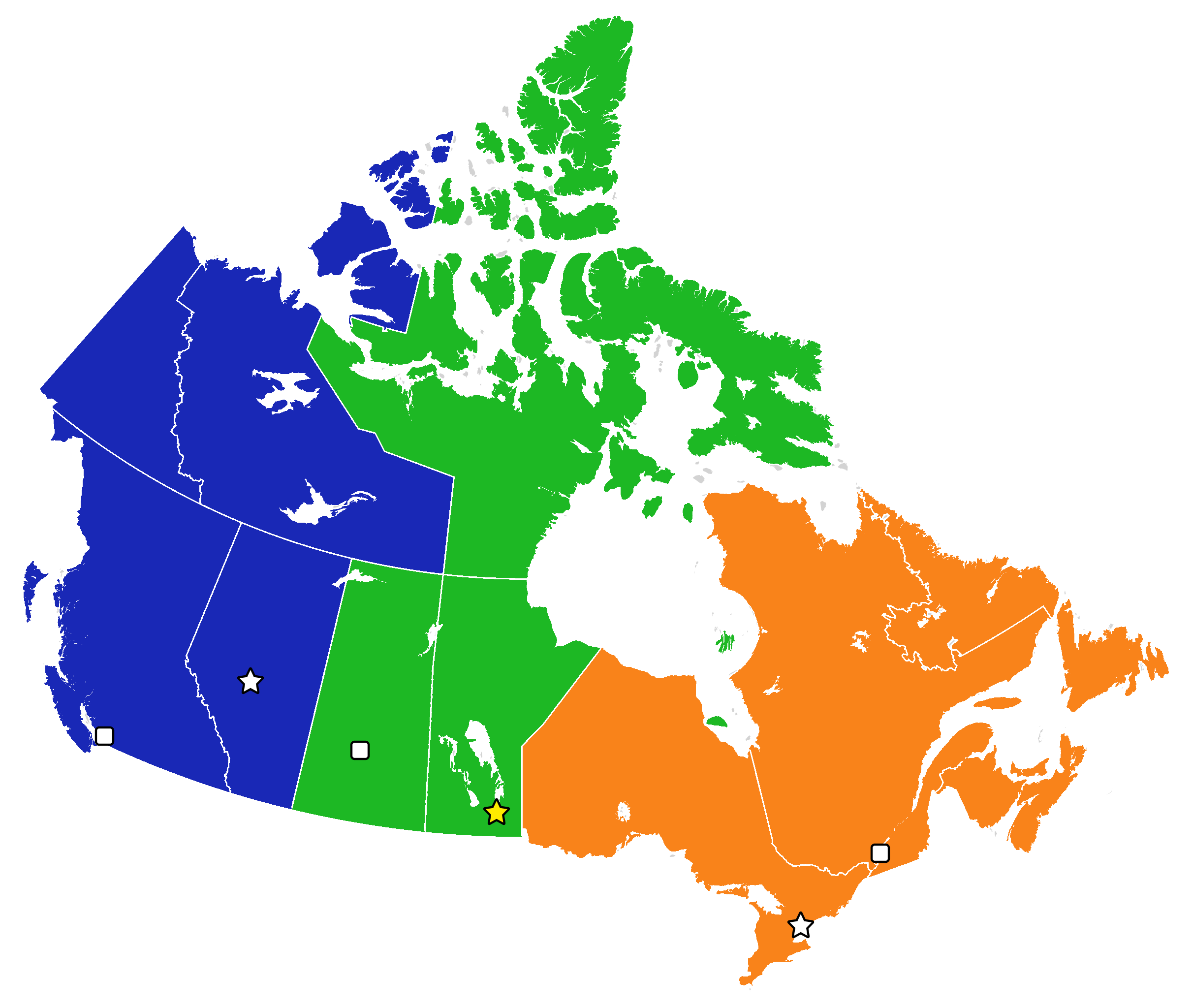
The Western eparchy is marked in blue

The Western Eparchy is an eparchy of the Ukrainian Orthodox Church of Canada, which itself is under the Ecumenical Patriarchate.

The Western Eparchy consists of the Canadian provinces of Alberta and British Columbia, and has about 60 churches (most of them country churches), and two cathedral churches (St. John's Cathedral, Edmonton, and Holy Trinity Ukrainian Orthodox Cathedral).

In April 2022, just after the start of the Russian invasion of Ukraine, the Western Eparchy formalized an agreement whereby they (and the larger UOCC) could send aid to Ukraine via the Orthodox Church of Ukraine directly.

== Current bishop ==
In 2023, the bishop for the eparchy was Ilarion (Roman Rudnyk), and he is stylized as Bishop of Edmonton, and the Western Eparchy. The last serving bishop for the diocese was Metropolitan John (Stinka), who went on to become the UOCC's Metropolitan, and Archbishop of Winnipeg. John (Stinka) served in the capacity of "Bishop of Edmonton" for 20 years (1985–2005). He died in 2022. Ilarion was elected as Bishop of Edmonton at the Ukrainian Orthodox Church's Sobor (Church Council) on August 23, 2008, in Saskatoon, Saskatchewan. This election was later ratified by the Ecumenical Patriarchate's Holy and Sacred Synod, and he was enthroned as Bishop of Edmonton on Sunday, October 26, 2008, at St. John's Cathedral by Metropolitan John.

On September 7, 2018, the Chief Secretariat of the Patriarchate of Constantinople Holy Synod announced the appointment of Bishop Hilarion and Archbishop Daniel of Pamphilon as ‘exarchs’ of the Patriarchate of Constantinople for Kiev.

== List of bishops ==
- Andrew (Metiuk) (1958–1975).
- Boris (Yakovkevych) (1975–1983)
- John (Stinka) (1985–2005)
- Hilarion (Rudnyk) (2008–present)

== See also ==
- Ukrainian Orthodox Church of Canada
- St. John's Cathedral, Edmonton
- Holy Trinity Ukrainian Orthodox Cathedral (Vancouver)
