= St. John Cathedral (Edmonton) =

Coordinates: 53°33′22″N 113°30′20″W

- Ukrainian Orthodox Cathedral of St. John the Baptist
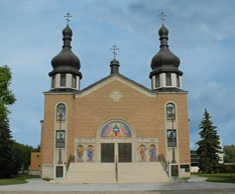
- The front elevation of the Cathedral.
- St. John Cathedral
- Location: Edmonton, Alberta
- Country: Canada
- Denomination: Eastern Orthodox
- Website: uocc-stjohn.ca

History
- Status: Cathedral
- Dedication: John the Baptist

Architecture
- Functional status: Active

Specifications
- Materials: Brick

Administration
- Metropolis: Ukrainian Orthodox Church of Canada
- Diocese: Western Eparchy

Clergy
- Bishop: Bishop Ilarion (Rudnyk)

St. John Cathedral, (or more formally the Ukrainian Orthodox Cathedral of St. John the Baptist, often misspelled St. John’s) in Edmonton, is the throne of the Bishop of the Western Eparchy of the Ukrainian Orthodox Church of Canada. The current bishop for the cathedral is Ilarion (Rudnyk).

== Cultural Centre ==
St. John's Cultural Centre was developed and opened for use in 1965. A number of additions and renovations have enhanced the original facility, the latest being the Solarium, which was completed in 2001. The facility was established primarily to accommodate the needs of the congregation, various Ukrainian associations and the community at large.

The Cultural Centre is used for events such as weddings, banquets, socials, memorial dinners, seminars, workshops, conferences and meetings.

== See also ==
- Ukrainian Orthodox Church of Canada
- Archbishop of Edmonton and Western Canada
