= Reactions of the Eastern Orthodox churches to the 2018 Moscow–Constantinople schism =

Current status of the 2018 schism by Orthodox Church jurisdiction. Recognises OCU autocephaly Concelebrated with or commemorated OCU primate in Divine Liturgy diptych No definitive statements yet on OCU Does NOT recognise OCU autocephaly Territorial disputes between Moscow Patriarchate (MP) and Ecumenical Patriarchate of Constantinople or Romanian Orthodox Church.

On 15 October 2018, the Russian Orthodox Church broke the communion with the Ecumenical Patriarchate because of a dispute concerning the canonical jurisdiction over Ukraine. This led to the 2018 Moscow–Constantinople schism. Numerous Orthodox churches took position concerning the dispute over the canonical jurisdiction over Ukraine, whether before or after this schism.

== Russian Orthodox Church and the Ecumenical Patriarchate ==
=== Russian Orthodox Church ===
==== 2018 ====
===== September =====
On 1 September, Metropolitan Hilarion, head of the Department for External Church Relations (DECR) of the ROC, declared: "we very much hope that the Patriarchate of Constantinople will manifest responsibility and take into consideration all the voices of Local Orthodox Churches, which have been clearly sounded in this period, and that the unity of world Orthodoxy will be preserved."

On 8 September 2018, an interview by Metropolitan Hilarion, chairman of the Department of External Church Relations of the Russian Orthodox Church, was published on the official website of the External Church Relations of the Russian Orthodox Church. In it, Hilarion warned:

when Constantinople in such an aggressive and cynical manner is interfering in the affairs of another Local Church, not only leads the dialogue into a deadlock, but also creates a threat of schism for the Universal Orthodoxy. In the event that Constantinople carries through its cunning plan of granting the autocephaly, it will mean that a group of schismatics will receive it. The canonical Church will not accept this autocephaly. The Russian Church will not recognize this autocephaly, of course. We will have no other choice but to break the communion with Constantinople. It means that the Patriarch of Constantinople will no longer have the right to call himself, as he is doing now, "the leader of the 300 million Orthodox Christians worldwide." At least half of the Orthodox Christians will not recognize him at all. By his actions he will, in fact, split the world Orthodoxy.

On 8 September, the synod of the Russian Orthodox Church expressed its "resolute protest against and deep indignation at" the report published a day prior on the appointment of the two hierarchs of the Ecumenical Patriarchate as exarchs of the Patriarchate for Kiev. The same day, on a social network, Vladimir Legoyda, head of the Synodal Department for Church, Society and Media Relations of the Russian Orthodox Church, commented on the topic and stated that "[t]he appointment by the Patriarch of Constantinople of his episcopal representatives in Ukraine, without agreement with the Patriarch of Moscow [...] and His Beatitude [the] Metropolitan of Kiev [...], is [...] an unprecedentedly gross incursion into the Moscow Patriarchate's canonical territory[.] [...] These actions cannot be left unanswered". The same day, the UOC-MP published an official declaration on its website which states: "[T]he appointment of the two Exarchs is a gross violation of the canonical territory of the Ukrainian Orthodox Church. The decision made by the Constantinopolitan Patriarchate contradicts the 2nd Canon of the Second Ecumenical Council (Constantinople), namely that, without being invited, "Bishops must not leave their own diocese and go over to churches beyond its boundaries"."

On 14 September 2018, in response to the appointment of those two exarchs, the Russian Orthodox Church decided to hold "an extraordinary session" to take "retaliatory measures after the appointment by the Patriarchate of Constantinople of its "exarchs" to Kiev following up the decision of this Church's Synod "to grant autocephalous status to the Orthodox Church in Ukraine."" The synod of the ROC decided to stop commemorating the Ecumenical Patriarch during the divine liturgy.

On 30 September 2018, in an interview to Izvestia daily published on the official website of the Moscow Patriarchate's Department for External Church Relations, Metropolitan Hilarion commented: "The Russian Church does not need to fear isolation. If Constantinople continues its anti-canonical actions, it will place itself outside the canonical space, outside the understanding of church order that distinguishes the Orthodox Church."

===== October =====
On 2 October, Patriarch Kirill of the ROC sent a letter to all the autocephalous Orthodox churches to ask them to hold a "Pan-Orthodox discussion" concerning the question of Ukraine's autocephaly.

On 5 October, the Metropolitan Pavel, head of the Belarusian Orthodox Church (exarchate of the Russian Orthodox Church), announced the meeting of the Holy Synod of the Russian Orthodox Church on 15 October in Minsk. He said that "The situation with the Orthodox Church in Ukraine will be on the agenda of the meeting". This meeting had been announced previously on 7 January 2018 and was at the time "most likely to take place in mid October."

On 9 October, Metropolitan Hilarion, chairman of the Department of External Church Relations of the Russian Orthodox Church warned that "if the project for Ukrainian autocephaly is carried through, it will mean a tragic and possibly irretrievable schism of the whole Orthodoxy." He added that "ignoring sacred canons shakes up the whole system of the church organism. Schismatics in other Local Churches are well aware that if autocephaly is given to the Ukrainian schismatics, it will be possible to repeat the same scenario anywhere. That is why we state that autocephaly in Ukraine will not be ‘the healing of the schism’ but its legalization and encouragement."

On 16 October 2018, the very next day after the break of communion, Metropolitan Hilarion, chairman of the Department of External Church Relations of the Russian Orthodox Church, explained on Russian television that the decisions of the Patriarch of Constantinople "run contrary to the canonical Tradition of the Orthodox Church". Moreover, an official communicate from the External Church Relations of the Russian Orthodox Church published the same day quoted Hilarion saying: "we no longer have a single coordinating center in the Orthodox Church, and we should very clearly realize that the Patriarchate of Constantinople has self-destructed as such [because] having invaded the canonical boundaries of another Local Church, by legitimatizing a schism it [the Ecumenical Patriarchate] has lost the right to be called the coordinating center for the Orthodox Church"

On 17 October, Metropolitan Hilarion, head of the Moscow Patriarchate Department for External Church Relations, was interviewed by the BBC Russian Service; this interview was published on the official website of the Department of External Church Relations of the Russian Orthodox Church the very same day. Hilarion declared: "As of today, we have very clearly stated: the fact that the Patriarchate of Constantinople has recognized a schismatic structure means for us that Constantinople itself is now in schism. It has identified itself with a schism. Accordingly, we cannot have the full Eucharistic communion with it." Hilarion added that when members of the Russian Orthodox of Moscow Patriarchate pay visits to the monasteries on Mount Athos, they cannot participate in the sacraments (for example, receive communion), and promised punishment to any priests who participate in the divine services together with the local clergy. It is known that Russia makes large donations to the monasteries on Athos (the sum of $200 million was announced by a source close to the Moscow Patriarchate and confirmed by Hilarion). Hilarion hinted that "[h]istory shows that when Athos is concerned over something, the monasteries on the Holy Mountain do find ways to inform the Patriarch of Constantinople about it" and called on Russian businessmen to switch donations to Russian sacred places.

On 19 October, during a meeting with Pope Francis, Hilarion announces him that "because of the actions of the Patriarchate of Constantinople the Russian Orthodox Church had to suspend its participation in the work of the Joint International Commission for Theological Dialogue between the Roman Catholic Church and the Orthodox Church". Hilarion explained on November that it was due to the fact that the synod of the Russian Orthodox Church had previously, on 14 September, decided "to break off the participation of the Russian Orthodox Church in the Episcopal Assemblies and in the theological dialogues, multilateral commissions and any other structures chaired or co-chaired by representatives of the Patriarchate of Constantinople."

On 21 October, Metropolitan Hilarion declared in an interview that "[t]he Patriarch of Constantinople, who has positioned himself as the coordinator of common Orthodox activity, can no longer be such a coordinator" because said Patriarch of Constantinople had "opted for schismatics and ha[d] fully associated himself with them"; this interview was published on the official website of the Department of External Church Relations of the Russian Orthodox Church.

On 22 October, Hilarion published a declaration on the same official website which stipulates that according to the Russian Orthodox Church, Filaret "was and remains a schismatic" despite the recognition of Filaret by the Patriarch of Constantinople. In the declaration, Hilarion also expressed his fears that, since on the 20 October 2018 the UOC-KP had decided to give the title of archimandrite of the Kiev Pechersk and Pochayiv Lavras to Filaret, Filaret could be planning to seize "the main holy sites of the canonical Ukrainian Church [i.e. the Ukrainian Orthodox Church (Moscow Patriarchate)]". On 30 October Filaret declared that after the unification council there would be no violence against the UOC, including in resolving property issues.

On 23 October, Archpriest Igor Yakimchuk, from the Moscow Patriarchate Department for External Church Relations secretary for far abroad, told Interfax that "[g]iven that the Byzantine Empire long ago ceased to exist and that Istanbul is not even the capital of Turkey now, there are no more canonical foundations even for the symbolic primacy of the Constantinople Patriarchate in the Orthodox world", and that the ROC would not comply to the Ecumenical Patriarch's decision.

On 27 October, archpriest Nikolai Balashov, Deputy Head of Department for External Church Relations (DECR) of the ROC, declared in an interview that they "will never stop regarding Kiev as the mother of all Russian cities, as the font of [their] christening, birthplace of [their] Christian culture." The same day, on the Russia-24 channel, Metropolitan Hilarion gave an interview; the restranscription of this interview was published the 28 October on the official website of the Department of External Church Relations of the Russian Orthodox Church. Hilarion declared that the Ecumenical Patriarch was "in a great hurry" to satisfies his "customers" from Ukraine and the USA, he also claimed that a special division of the staff in the US embassies was dedicated to influence the Ecumenical Patriarch and to take care of the situation in Ukraine. He also stated: "We understand that Patriarch Bartholomew is not free now in his actions."

On 28 October, the Patriarch of Moscow Kirill stated in a speech, which was two days later published on the official website of the Department of External Church Relations of the Russian Orthodox Church, that there was "no conflict whatsoever between Constantinople and Moscow! There is Moscow's defense of the inviolable canonical norms [...] If one of the Churches supports the schismatics, if one of the Churches violates canons, then she ceases to be an Orthodox Church. Therefore, the position of the Russian Orthodox Church today, which has stopped the liturgical mention of the Patriarch of Constantinople, has to do not only with the relationships between the two Patriarchs – the point is the very nature of the Orthodox Churc[h]."

===== November =====
In an interview given to Orthodoxia.info published on 6 November 2018, Metropolitan Onufriy's spokesman, Archbishop Kliment (Vecheria), declared that the Ecumenical Patriarch should have remembered that "Byzantium ended 500 years ago" and added that the Church "lives according to the gospel and not based on 'prerogatives' rooted in a nonexistent empire".

On 12 November the first priest was sent by Patriarch Kirill to Istanbul (Turkey) "at the request of Russian believers who live in Turkey".

In November, the Moscow Patriarchate established a parish in Constantinople, a territory under the canonical jurisdiction of the Ecumenical Patriarchate.

During the month of November, Metropolitan Hilarion gave some interviews to news agencies from different countries which were published on the official website of the Department of External Church Relations of the Russian Orthodox Church. He declared that "the mechanisms of inter-Orthodox dialogue and cooperation, which were developing for a long while, have been destroyed. [...] [T]he Patriarchate of Constantinople, first in honour, acted as coordinator of the inter-Orthodox activities. Yet, now, when over a half of all the Orthodox Christians in the world are not in communion with it, Constantinople has lost this role". In another interview he said that the Ecumenical Patriarch "claims the power over history itself by revoking decisions made over three centuries ago", that "[t]he danger of destruction of ages-old traditions has been more and more clearly realized now by Primates and hierarchs of Local Orthodox Churches, who speak out in favour of a pan-Orthodox discussion on the Ukrainian problem. In the new situation, which has shaped now, we have to search for new forms of communication of Churches adequate to it", and that the Ecumenical Patriarch could not chair a Pan-Orthodox Council since "[t]he coordinating role that the Throne of Constantinople played, though not without difficulties, in the Orthodox world in the second part of the 20th century, cannot be played by it now" because "[t]he Patriarchate of Constantinople has self-destructed as the coordinating center for Orthodox Churches." In his last interview he declared that the Ecumenical Patriarch's actions "allegedly aimed to heal the Ukrainian schism [...] [a]ctually lead to the deepening of the schism in Ukraine and to creating for the Orthodox Church an unprecedented situation when the whole body of the world Orthodoxy may find itself split into pieces."

On 22 November, Metropolitan Hilarion said on the channel Russia-TV 24 that Ukraine would never get its autocephaly.

On 26 November, Metropolitan Hilarion declared that the ROC would send a priest in South Korea and declared the plans "to create a full-fledged parish", because until the 1950s in Korea was a Russian Spiritual Mission whose faithfuls were in the 1950s transferred to the Ecumenical Patriarchate's jurisdiction. The priest is scheduled to be sent by the end of the year.

On 28 November, the ROC officials reacted at the announce of the Ecumenical Patriarchate's decision (taken on 27 November 2018) to dissolve the Archdiocese of Russian Orthodox Churches in Western Europe. The ROC officials reminded that during the spring of 2003, Patriarch Alexy II of Moscow proposed to all bishops and Orthodox parishes of Russian tradition in Western Europe to unite as part of the self-governing metropolitan district of the Russian Orthodox Church.

===== December =====
On 4 December, in an interview given to Orthodoxie.com, Metropolitan Hilarion declared that the fact the Patriarch of Constantinople had fallen in schism "was not without precedents in the history of the Constantinople Patriarchate" and gave the example of Nestorius and the Patriarchs of Constantinople who accepted the union with the Catholic Church after the Council of Florence. He also said the Ecumenical Patriarchate's actions in Ukraine were a "revenge" on Patriarch Kirill of Moscow because, according to Hilarion, the Ecumenical Patriarch believes that it is the Russian Orthodox Church who incited some Orthodox churches not to participate in the Pan-Orthodox Council of Crete.

On 14 December, ROC claimed that Patriarch Kirill sent messages to the Primates of the Local Orthodox Churches, to Pope Francis, to Archbishop of Canterbury Justin Welby, head of the Anglican Communion, to Rev. Dr. Olav Fykse Tveit, General Secretary of the World Council of Churches, to António Guterres, United Nations Secretary-General, and to Thomas Greminger, Secretary General of the Organization for Security and Co-operation in Europe. He also sent messages to Emmanuel Macron, President of France, and to Angela Merkel, Chancellor of Germany, as they were both heads of the Normandy format. Patriarch Kirill wanted to draw their attention to what he perceived as "the large-scale violations of the rights and freedom of hierarchs, clergy and laity of the Ukrainian Orthodox Church." However, UN Secretary-General António Guterres did not receive such a letter.

On 15 December, after the election of Epiphanius at the unification council, archpriest Nikolay Balashov, deputy head of the Moscow Patriarchate Department for External Church Relations, told Interfax that this election "means nothing" for the ROC.

After the unification council, the Patriarch of Moscow sent a letter to the primates of all the autocephalous local Orthodox churches (but not to the Ecumenical Patriarchate nor to the OCU), urging them not to recognize the OCU and that "there was no unification. The schismatics were and still are outside the Church."

On 21 December, after the diocesan assembly of Moscow, the Patriarch of Moscow declared during that the Soviet persecution of the ROC, the Patriarchate of Constantinople "did all it could to tear from [the ROC's] living body those parts that were within its reach: Estonia, Finland, Poland, and Latvia." (Note: The ROC considers in its 14 September 2018 statement that "the Patriarchate of Constantinople, behind [the ROC's] back and without its consent, took uncanonical actions against [the ROC's] parts – the autonomous Churches in the territory of the young states formed on the borders of the former Russian Empire: in 1923 it transformed the autonomous Churches in the territory of Estonia and Finland into its own metropolias, in 1924 granted the autocephaly to the Polish Orthodox Church[i], and in 1936 proclaimed its jurisdiction in Latvia. […]" In the same statement, the ROC reminded that "the Moscow Patriarchate, on its turn, in 1948 granted the autocephalous rights to the Orthodox Church in Poland and confirmed the autonomous status of the Orthodox Church in Finland, granted by His Holiness Patriarch Tikhon in 1921, having agreed in 1957 to consign to oblivion all canonical disputes and misunderstandings between the Orthodox Church of Finland and the Russian Orthodox Church")

On 28 December, the synod of the ROC decided to establish exarchates of South-East Asia (PESEA) and Western Europe of the Moscow Patriarchate (PEWE). It was decided that the following countries would be under the PEWE's responsibility: Andorra, Belgium, the United Kingdom, Ireland, Spain, Italia, Liechtenstein, Luxembourg, the Principality of Monaco, the Netherlands, Portugal, France, and Switzerland. This was done in response to the Ecumenical Patriarchate's actions in Ukraine. On the same day, in an interview with Russia-24 channel, Metropolitan Hilarion declared the ROC "will now act as if they [Constantinople] do not exist at all because our purpose is missionary, our task is to educate, we are creating these structures for ministerial care about our flock, there can be no such deterring factors here", and that the ROC will take charge of the Orthodox faithfuls of its diaspora instead of the Eumenical Patriarchate.

On 29 December, during an interview to the channel Russia-24, Metropolitan Hilarion declared the Patriarch of Moscow had informed during the last meeting of the Supreme Diocesan Assembly of Moscow Orthodox faithfuls could communicate in the territory of the Mount Athos, but only in the Saint Panteleimon Monastery. The territory of the Mount Athos is under the jurisdiction of the Ecumenical Patriarchate. Hilarion declared the Saint Panteleimon Monastery "belongs to the Constantinople Church, as do all monasteries on Mt. Athos, but we know that it was built with Russian money by Russian monks and houses a Russian and Ukrainian monastic brotherhood, all rites are performed in a Slavic language and the laity who come there may take communion in it [...] But not in other Athos monasteries".

On 30 December, Interfax reported that the ROC was building a church on the territory of the embassy of Russia in Ankara. Turkey is part of the jurisdiction of the Ecumenical Patriarchate.

On 30 December, Patriarch Kirill sent a letter to Ecumenical Patriarch Bartholomew. In this letter, Kirill declared: "if you [Ecumenical Patriarch] will act in keeping with intentions enunciated in your letter, you will forever lose an opportunity to serve to the unity of the holy Churches of God, will cease being the First in the Orthodox world which numbers hundreds of millions of believers, and the sufferings that you have inflicted upon Orthodox Ukrainians will follow you to the Last Judgment of our Lord who judges all people impartially and will testify against you before Him." The letter was published on the official websites of the ROC on 31 December.

==== 2019 ====
===== January =====
On 5 January 2019, press secretary of the Patriarch of Moscow Alexander Volkov declared that "Patriarch Bartholomew today finally cut himself off from world Orthodoxy by joining the schism" because the Ecumenical Patriarch had signed the tomos granting autocephaly to the OCU. On the same day, Vladimir Legoyda, head of the Synodal Department for Church, Society and Media Relations of the ROC declared the tomos of autocephaly the Ecumenical Patriarch had signed was "a paper that is a result of unbridled political and personal ambitions. Signed in violation of the canons and thus possessing no canonical force".

On 7 January 2019, during the festive Christmas liturgy in the Cathedral of Christ the Savior, Patriarch Kirill of the ROC did not mention a single name of the primates of other local Orthodox Churches, with whom the ROC is in canonical communion. Such commemoration (in Greek, it is called "diptych") is demanded by a church charter and is a centuries-old tradition. In contrast to this, the head of the newly created Orthodox Church of Ukraine, Metropolitan Epiphanius, solemnly listed the names of all the primates, including the "Most Holy Patriarch of Russia Kirill".

On 14 January 2019, Metropolitan Hilarion declared:

The Russian Orthodox Church originated in Kiev, not in Moscow, not in St. Petersburg. Kiev is our baptismal font. We respect political borders, but we also expect political leaders to respect self-consciousness of the faithful in Russia, in Ukraine, in Byelorussia, in Moldova, and in other states in which the Russian Orthodox Church has its presence. Recently we have often heard from representatives of the Patriarchate of Constantinople that it recognizes the Moscow Patriarchate in the borders in which it existed at the end of the 16th century, when the Eastern Patriarchs recognized the Patriarch of Moscow as the fifth among them. They say that what happened afterwards was an unlawful expansion of the Russian Orthodox Church. It is very strange to hear these arguments, for they imply that the missionary work of the Russian Orthodox Church in the territories that were gradually added to the Russian Empire was something unlawful. They imply that the Russian Orthodox Church should have remained within the limits of the Moscow principalities, and that all new lands added to the Russian Empire should not have been an area of missionary activities of the Church. We cannot accept such arguments. We find them foolish and believe that the Patriarchate of Constantinople is very, very wrong in these deliberations.

On 30 January 2019, Vladimir Legoyda, head of the Russian Orthodox Church's Department for Church, Society and Media Relations, wrote that the tomos of the OCU made the OCU a vassal of the Ecumenical Patriarchate.

On 31 January, Patriarch Kirill declared the point of no return between the ROC and the Ecumenical Patriarchate had not been reached, stating: "The point of no return is the end of existence. Each of us will experience such a point when our physical life ends. But as long as we live, as long as the Church lives, no point of no return must exist, and I am sure this will not happen". On the same day, he declared:

Ukraine is not on the periphery of our church. We call Kiev 'the mother of all Russian cities.' For us Kiev is what Jerusalem is for many. Russian Orthodoxy began there, so under no circumstances can we abandon this historical and spiritual relationship. The whole unity of our Local Church is based on these spiritual ties.

On 11 February 2019, Metropolitan Hilarion said in an interview published on the official website of the DECR that the Mount Athos had to make a choice and that he hopes the Mount Athos "will make the only right choice – the one in favor of canonical order."

===== April =====
In April, an article of Metropolitan Hilarion was published on the website of the DECR, titled "Two-headed hydra of Ukrainian schism and the world Orthodoxy" In the article, Hilarion which he explained why, according to him, no other local Orthodox Churches apart from the Ecumenical Patriarchate have recognized the OCU in the last four months.

===== May =====
On 29 May, the Moscow Patriarchate Department For External Church Relations published a commentary of the 20 February 2019 letter of the Ecumenical Patriarchate to Archbishop Anastasios of Albania; the comment had been written by experts of the Synodal Biblical and Theological Commission of the ROC.

On 30 May 2019, Vladimir Legoyda, head of the Synodal Department for Church, Society and Media Relations of the ROC, said the ROC was aware of the efforts of the Church of Cyprus primate, Chrysostomos II, and added that "to some extent [Chrysostomos'] actions can be considered in line with the ROC proposal [...] He has consistently held talks with representatives from various local Churches, telling of the need to resolve the problem" Legoyda also said the ROC "has repeatedly stressed the desire and the need for a pan-Orthodox decision on this issue because it cannot be resolved unilaterally"

===== October =====
On 7 October 2019, the ROC officially released a comments by the Secretariat of the Biblical and Theological Synodal Commission of the Russian Orthodox Church. "The document discusses the problems of apostolic succession among schismatic «hierarchs», the limits of application of the oikonomia principle, issues of the lack of legitimacy of the OCU, the distortion of the role of the first bishop in the Orthodox Church, and explains the suspension of Eucharistic communion."

On 17 October 2019, the Holy Synod of the ROC reacted to the announcement that the Church of Greece had recognized the OCU. The Holy Synod stated: "If the Ukrainian schism is really recognized by the Greek Orthodox Church and its Primate — either in the form of a joint service, liturgical commemoration of the leader of the schism or sending official letters to them — it will be a sad testimony to the deepening division in the family of local Orthodox Churches. [...] We cease the prayer and Eucharistic communion with those bishops of the Greek Church who have entered or will enter into communion with representatives of the Ukrainian non-canonical schismatic communities. [...] the Holy Synod of the Russian Orthodox Church authorizes his Holiness Patriarch Kirill of Moscow and all Russia to stop the commemoration of the name of His Beatitude Archbishop of Athens and the entire Greece in the diptychs if the Primate of the Greek Church begins to commemorate the head of one of the Ukrainian schismatic groups during divine services or takes other actions indicating the recognition of the Ukrainian schism."

===== November =====
On Sunday, 3 November 2019, Patriarch Kirill did not mention the primate of the Church of Greece in the liturgy, removing him from the diptych.

On 8 November 2019, the Moscow Patriarchate announced that Patriarch Kirill would stop commemorating the Patriarch of Alexandria and all Africa after the latter and his Church recognized the OCU that same day On 25 November 2019, Patriarch Kirill of Moscow temporarily suspended the Moscow mission of the Patriarchate of Alexandria and All Africa. The future closing of the representation of the Patriarchate of Alexandria in Moscow was announced.

===== December =====
On 30 December 2019, the Holy Synod of the Russian Orthodox Church called all local churches in Montenegro to support the Serbian Orthodox Church calling the Law on Freedom of Religion "an act of supporting the schism by weakening the canonical Church and trying to put it in a humiliating and dangerous dependence on the state."

==== 2020 ====
===== September =====
On 5 September 2020, Metropolitan Hilarion (Alfeyev) stated that Russian Orthodox Church firmly stands with the position held by Serbian Orthodox Church. He also stated that the newly adopted law represents direct meddling of Montenegrin government into affairs of the church.

===== November =====
On 20 November 2020, the Holy Synod of the ROC declared that Patriarch Kirill can no longer commemorate Archbishop Chrysostomos II of Cyprus as a result of Chrysostomos' commemoration of Epiphanius on 24 October 2020.

==== 2021 ====
===== May =====
In May 2021, Metropolitan Hilarion (Alfeyev) dismissed Ecumenical Patriarch Bartholomew's accusations that the Russian Orthodox Church would blackmail the Georgian Orthodox Church with granting autocephaly to Abkhazia and South Ossetia and stated that Russia would recognize these as part of the canonical territory of the Georgian Patriarchate. He claimed that the Constantinople is misinformed on Georgia like "on the Ukrainian question."

==== 2022 ====
===== September =====
Archpriest Nikolai Balasov told the Interfax news agency that he was not surprised by the Saeima's decision to declare the Latvian Orthodox Church unilaterally autocephalous as it follows the "in the general logic of decision-making in many European countries" and that "obviously, they firmly believe in political expediency and state security, and they are not afraid of God to declare autocephaly". He even stated that they "outdid the Middle Ages” in regards to the separation between religion and state..

==== 2024 ====
===== August =====
On 22 August 2024, the Holy Synod of the ROC accused the Ukrainian government of "systematically, step by step trying to weaken, split and destroy the Ukrainian Orthodox Church" with the Law of Ukraine "On the Protection of the Constitutional Order in the Field of Activities of Religious Organizations" which was passed two days earlier. The ROC went as far as comparing it to cases of Christian persecutions in the Roman Empire, French Revolution, Soviet Union and under Enver Hoxha and accused the Ecumenical Patriarch of "orchestrating the persecutions".

=== Ecumenical Patriarchate ===
==== 2018 ====
On 22 October, the Ecumenical Patriarch Bartholomew declared "Whether our Russian brothers like it or not, soon enough they will get behind the Ecumenical Patriarchate's solution, as they will have no other choice". The Ecumenical Patriarch added he was aware Russia was doing efforts to thwart the Ecumenical Patriarchate's plans.

On 23 September 2018 Patriarch Bartholomew, while celebrating Divine Liturgy in the Saint Fokas Orthodox Church "proclaimed that he had sent a message that Ukraine would receive autocephaly as soon as possible, since it is entitled to it".

On 26 September, the recently appointed exarch of Ukraine, Daniel of Pamphilon, declared on his Facebook page that concerning the future of Ukraine "[t]he path to the Autocephaly is irreversible".

On 24 November, the Ecumenical Patriarch declared to the holy synod of the Romanian Orthodox Church concerning the pre-conciliar agreement concerning the granting of autocephaly to a church: (Note: The pre-conciliar document can be found here)

Of course, the pre-conciliar treatment of the issue of autocephaly provisioned a different solution. However, once consensus has not been reached – and the Ecumenical Patriarchate is in no way responsible for this – so that Autocephaly be eventually included in the agenda of the issues under consideration at the Holy and Great Council, it is self-evident that the hitherto relevant practice for centuries is applied and be ratified ad referendum at a future Ecumenical Council.

On 13 December 2018, in his homily, Ecumenical Patriarch Bartholomew declared the decision by the ROC to break communion was "extreme", and "unacceptable" as a lever of pressure.

On 14 December, the Ecumenical Patriarchate published on its official website a comment by Metropolitan Sotirios of Pisidia regarding the celebration of a mass at Belek by a priest of the ROC with the support of the Russian consulate in Antalya. In said commentary, the Metropolitan said this region was part of the Ecumenical Patriarchate's jurisdiction and that the priest of the ROC had not asked the Ecumenical Patriarchate to conduct this mass on the Ecumenical Patriarchate's territory. Therefore, according to the Metropolitan, the priest had transgressed some canons, and such a behavior could create a schism among the faithfuls of the region of Belek.

On 24 December 2018, Patriarch Bartholomew responded to the allegations made by the ROC that he had been bribed. Bartholomew responded by making a joke saying "the Russian Church accuses me of having received money to proclaim this autocephaly – actually I didn't really receive money, but rather a lot of candies and chocolates from the factory... the factory of Poroshenko. He sent me a lot of sacks like these, I have already distributed them all. These two are the last ones. I will open them, and throw them among you, so whoever is lucky will get some of it." (for the reference of the joke, see: Petro Poroshenko#Business career). The video of this speech was published on the official Facebook page of the Ecumenical Patriarchate.

==== 2019 ====
On 25 January 2019, the Ecumenical Patriarch talked about the subject of the Orthodox Church of Ukraine.

In 2019, the Ecumenical Patriarch declared, in a letter to Patriarch John X of Antioch, that he (the Ecumenical Patriarch) would not convene a pan-Orthodox council on the question of Ukraine.

On 20 February 2019, the Ecumenical Patriarch answered the letter of the Holy Synod of the Albanian Orthodox Church. The Ecumenical Patriarch justified, with historical arguments, that the Ecumenical Patriarchate had the right to give autocephaly to the OCU. Concerning the validity of the ordinations performed by Filaret, the Ecumenical Patriarch joined the researches of Metropolitan Vasily (Note: The study of Metropolitan Vasily can be found in Ukrainian here, and in Greek here.) and cited the example of the mending of the Meletian schism, the Bulgarian schism, and the ROCOR schism to prove the validity of Filaret's ordinations.

In an interview published on 21 February 2019 in the Serbian magazine Politika, the Ecumenical Patriarch Bartholomew declared that there is no Pope of the East in the religious conscience of Orthodox Church. In the same interview, he declared: "As for the provision of autocephaly with the consent of other Orthodox Churches, this did not happen, because it is not a tradition in our Church. All the Tomoses of the autocephaly that were granted to the newly created autocephalous churches (Russia, Serbia, Romania, Bulgaria, Georgia, Athens, Warsaw, Tirana and Presov) were provided by the Ecumenical Patriarchate, and this was not preceded by any agreement or negotiation at the Pan-Orthodox level." Bartholomew also declared that no State pressured the Ecumenical Patriarchate to grant autocephaly to Ukraine, but that "a large number of state leaders have greeted the Ecumenical Patriarchate with this decision."

In May 2019, Ecumenical Patriarch Bartholomew declared in a speech to journalists: "Regarding this issue and the Patriarchate's stance, a lot of false information have been fed to the media, such as falsified historical facts and distorted truth while the true facts have been carefully or/and deliberately concealed."

On 23 May, the Archons of the Ecumenical Patriarch announced an E-book titled The Ecumenical Patriarchate and Ukraine Autocephaly: Historical, Canonical, and Pastoral Perspectives would be released soon "to inform all people of goodwill about the truth regarding the Autocephaly granted by the Ecumenical Patriarchate of Constantinople to the Orthodox Church in Ukraine". On 30 May 2019, the E-book version of the book was released.

In December 2019, Ecumenical Patriarch Bartholomew announced that he "will never grant autocephaly to the so-called Montenegrin Orthodox Church".

==== 2021 ====
In May, Ecumenical Patriarch Bartholomew accused the ROC of blackmailing the Georgian Orthodox Church with the threat of recognizing the South Ossetian and Abkhazian Orthodox Churches. He stated that granting autocephaly is "exclusively the authority of Constantinople" and "it t is bad that the Russian Church interferes in the internal affairs of your [Georgian] Church."

==== 2023 ====
In March, the Ecumenical Patriarch reinstated five priests of the Russian Orthodox Diocese of Lithuania which were expelled for "canonical violations" but he accused the ROC of having them expelled for their opposition to the war.

==== 2024 ====
In January 2024, the Ecumenical Patriarchate founded the Exarchate of the Ecumenical Patriarchate in Lithuania challenging the Russian Orthodox Diocese of Lithuania.

In April 2024, Metropolitan Kyrillos of the Ecumenical Patriarchate challenged the validity of the tomos of autocephaly granted by the Serbian church to the Macedonian Orthodox Church calling it "fake" and a "shame" which would not be "recognized by anybody except the Russians" and stated that first the 15th church (Ukraine) has to be recognized before the 16th (Macedonia).

In the prelude of the Law of Ukraine "On the Protection of the Constitutional Order in the Field of Activities of Religious Organizations" in August 2024, Patriarch Bartholomew declared his support for the plans of the Ukrainian president Volodymyr Zelenskyy for "spiritual independence" accusing Russia of "trying to destroy religious freedom".

== Orthodox Church of Ukraine ==
=== 2021 ===
In October, The Mukachevo-Carpathian Eparchy of the OCU claimed that the BOR de facto recognised the OCU after a Metropolitan held a joint church service.

In November, Nestor (Pisik) claimed that Romanian Metropolitan Nifon (Mihăiță) indicated that the BOR would recognise the OCU if it far surpassed the UOC-MP.

After Metropolitan Cyprian of Stara Zagora of the BOC commemorated Epiphanius during a co-served liturgy on December 26th, Archbishop Yevstratiy (Zoria) claimed that this is a "shift in the Bulgarian Church’s views on the ‘Ukrainian issue".

=== 2022 ===
On 22 August 2022, Metropolitan Epiphanius wrote a letter to Metropolitan Sawa of the POC where he stated there is "no canonical basis, except subjective prejudice, which would prevent our local Churches from establishing a simple mode of contact between our local Churches" and expressed his disappointment that hierarchs and clergy of the POC would call the OCU "non-Christians".

In October, Archbishop Yevstratiy (Zoria) stated that the Latvian Orthodox Church (LOC-MP) could follow the path of the Estonian Apostolic Orthodox Church (EAOC) and come under the jurisdiction of Constantinople allowing them to negotiate an autonomy or autocephaly.

=== 2024 ===
The OCU rejected any structure of the BOR in Ukraine as they have only "canonical jurisdiction over the entire recognised territory of Ukraine".

On March 8, 2024, the Holy Synod of the Orthodox Church of Ukraine called on the Verkhovna Rada to adopt a draft law of the Law of Ukraine "On the Protection of the Constitutional Order in the Field of Activities of Religious Organizations" as soon as possible, which prohibits the subordination of any Ukrainian religious organizations to Russian religious and state centers. On August 21, 2024, Metropolitan Epiphanius of Kyiv declared that he was ready for a dialogue with Metropolitan Onufrii, and called on the faithful to reject the "Russian yoke".

In May 2025, 53 bishops of the OCU wrote an open letter to Ecumenical Patriarch Bartholomew calling him repudiate the "Russian world" ideology as they call it a "Eurasian political ideology of neo-imperialist aggression" replacing "dogmatic truths of Christianity".

=== 2025 ===
On 2 February, Holy Synod of the OCU called the hierarchs of the UOC-MP to start "constructive dialogue without preconditions".

On 27 May, Metropolitan Hilarion (Protsyk) called the members of the UOC-MP to join the OCU as they are welcoming them "with open arms".

== Responses from other autocephalous Eastern Orthodox churches ==
=== Church of Cyprus ===
On 26 September 2018, the head of the Church of Cyprus, Archbishop Chrysostomos II, had a meeting with the Ukrainian ambassador in Cyprus, Borys Humeniuk; during this meeting, the question of the ecclesiastical problems in Ukraine was discussed. During the meeting, Chrysostomos II "expressed his worry and concern about the latest events in the Ukrainian Church and the possibility of the creation of a schism that would harm the unity of all Orthodoxy" and declared that the Church of Cyprus was ready to be a "bridge for the normalization of the unstable situation" between the Patriarchates of Moscow and Constantinople concerning the question of the Orthodoxy in Ukraine. Those declarations were published on the official website of the Church of Cyprus.

On 9 January 2019, Archbishop Chrysostomos declared: "What's most important right now is not autocephaly, but that Orthodoxy may not be divided" He added he would never commemorate the name of the primate of the Orthodox Church of Ukraine in the diptych of the Divine Liturgy. On 25 January 2019, Archbishop Chrysostomos declared he considered the Ecumenical Patriarchate as the "Mother Church" and that he "maintains good relations with the Phanar, which he will preserve despite any difficulties." He added he would concelebrate one day with Metropolitan Epiphanius once the latter would have come in Cyprus.

On 7 February 2019, the holy synod of the Church of Cyprus decided that on 18 February 2019 the holy synod of the Church of Cyprus will hold an extraordinary meeting to give its final decision concerning the Ukrainian question. On 18 February, the Church of Cyprus declared it did not doubt the goals of granting autocephaly in Ukraine was to heal the schism in Ukraine; the Church of Cyprus also stated that if the schism in Ukraine was not overcame in a certain amount of time, the Church of Cyprus "expect[s] that the Ecumenical Patriarch, making use of his regulatory role given to him by his position as First in Orthodoxy, will convene either a Pan-Orthodox Council or a Synaxis of the Primates to act upon the matter." In the same communiqué, the Church of Cyprus declared it offered to be a mediator on the issue. The Church of Cyprus did not state it recognized the OCU.

==== Meeting with representatives of other churches ====
On 18 April 2019, the primates of the Church of Cyprus, the Church of Alexandria, the Church of Antioch, and the Church of Jerusalem gathered. They released a communiqué in which they write that among other things they "looked into the problems that arose after granting autocephaly to the Orthodox Church in Ukraine". The primates of Alexandria, Antioch and Jerusalem supported the "initiative of mediation" of the primate of the Church of Cyprus.

The primate of the Church of Cyprus released a communiqué on 14 May 2019 in which he said: "I have not received any order! I am leaving for Serbia, Bulgaria, and Greece to discuss the Ukrainian issue" From 17 May to 21 May he met the primates of the Bulgarian, Greek and Serbian Orthodox churches.

In May 2019, Archbishop Chrysostomos was interviewed concerning his mediation role in which he said: "if one Church agrees with one side, another Church will agree with the other, and it will be a great evil! We could then reach a schism! The best is for us all to agree, and to make a decision all together, because the decision of only one Church will not serve any purpose, and what I am afraid of would happen. For myself, I could make a decision in favor of one side or the other, but I consider it wrong. That's why I didn't do it!"

In an interview given on 6 September 2019, the primate of the Church of Cyprus said the Ecumenical Patriarch Bartholomew was displeased with the former's initiative of meetings: "We have taken the first step. We tried to begin seeing different Church primates and discovered that the Ecumenical Patriarch didn't want something like this. After that we just said, 'Did we commit a murder?' We stop here!" He also added: "As the Church of Cyprus we did not say we recognize [the Orthodox Church of Ukraine], but we do not recognize it either. We maintain a neutral relationship, and we want to have good relations with everyone."

In December 2019, the primate of the Church of Cyprus reiterated that his church had taken a neutral stance despite the actions of some of its hierarchs. He added that the Patriarchate of Moscow had asked him for his support; he replied that he disagreed with the decisions of the Moscow Patriarch to cease commemorating some other primates (the Ecumenical Patriarch, the Archbishop of Athens, and the Patriarch of Alexandria (Note: Thought at that time the Patriarch of Moscow is still commemorating the Patriarch of Alexandria.)). He added: "[The Patriarch of Moscow] is going to create a schism. And the schism is the greatest sin. I do not understand it. He wants to be the first. I told him you would never be the first. Over the past 17 centuries, the Patriarch of Constantinople has been established as first among all Eastern Orthodox primates. Full stop."

=== Greek Orthodox Church of Alexandria ===
On 22 October 2018, the Greek Orthodox Patriarchate of Alexandria and the Polish Orthodox Church issued a joint statement in which they "call upon all those on whom it depends to eliminate church misunderstandings associated with the bestowal of autocephaly to the Ukrainian Church; to please do whatever is within their might to avoid conflict over this issue in order to establish church order on Ukrainian territory."

On 18 April 2019, the primates of the Church of Cyprus, the Church of Alexandria, the Church of Antioch, and the Church of Jerusalem gathered. They released a communiqué in which they write that among other things they "looked into the problems that arose after granting autocephaly to the Orthodox Church in Ukraine". The primates of Alexandria, Antioch and Jerusalem supported the "initiative of mediation" of the primate of the Church of Cyprus.

In June 2019, the Orthodox Patriarch of Alexandria, in an interview, took a stand on the Ukrainian issue for the first time. He said the Ecumenical Patriarch "had the right to grant" autocephaly, but that the question of who received this autocephaly is what created divisions among the Orthodox churches. He added: "Every problem has its solution. Our Ecumenical Patriarch Bartholomew is the Patriarch of Romiosyne, who we all respect and love. Do not forget that this issue is not a dogmatic one. There is a solution to the issue of Autocephaly."

On 8 November 2019, the Patriarch of Alexandria and all Africa and his Church recognized the OCU. On 25 November 2019, Patriarch Kirill of Moscow temporarily suspended the Moscow mission of the Patriarchate of Alexandria and All Africa.

On 23 November 2022, the Holy Synod of the Patriarchate of Alexandria, meeting under the chairmanship of Patriarch Theodore II, decided the following things :

1. Interruption of commemoration of the Patriarch of Moscow, Cyril, until he comes back to his senses.

2. Deposition of the Russian Metropolitan Klin Leonidas, accused of interfering in the territory of an autocephalous Orthodox Church (Alexandria).

3. Condemnation of the ideology of the Russkiy mir as contrary to the teachings of Christ.

=== Polish Orthodox Church ===
In May 2018, the Polish Orthodox Church (POC) declared it "express[es] a clear position of the Polish Autocephalous Church, namely, that the ecclesiastic life of the canonical Orthodox Church should be based on the principles of dogmatic theology and the holy canons of the Orthodox Church. [...] The violation of this principle brings chaos to the life of the Church. In Ukraine, there are certain schismatic groups that must first repent and return to the canonical Church. Only then can we discuss the issue of granting autocephaly."

In September 2018, Secretary of the Chancellery of the POC sent a letter to rbc.ru in response to a request for a statement from the POC on the matter of Ukrainian autocephaly. In this letter, the POC reinstate its May 2018 position and that "[c]onsent of all the Local Churches is needed in order to grant the autocephaly to the Ukrainian Church, and a hasty decision can deepen the schism [...] autocephaly is granted by the Mother Church after reaching agreement with the Primates of all the Local Churches[.]"

On 22 October 2018, the Greek Orthodox Patriarchate of Alexandria and the Polish Orthodox Church issued a joint statement in which they "call upon all those on whom it depends to eliminate church misunderstandings associated with the bestowal of autocephaly to the Ukrainian Church; to please do whatever is within their might to avoid conflict over this issue in order to establish church order on Ukrainian territory."

On 16 November 2018, the Polish Orthodox Church issued an official communiqué after the meeting of its synod on 15 November 2018. The Polish Orthodox Church declared in this communiqué that it did not recognize the rehabilitation of the UAOC and the UOC-KP and that the synod "forbids the priests of the Polish Orthodox Church from having liturgical and prayerful contact with the ‘clergy’ of the so-called Kiev Patriarchate and the so-called ‘Autocephalous Orthodox Church,’ which have committed much evil in the past". The communiqué also stated that "[o]nly the observance of the dogmatic and canonical norms of the Church and the preservation of the centuries-old tradition will protect Orthodoxy from severe ecclesiastical consequences on an international scale."

On 8 January 2019, Metropolitan Sawa, primate of the Polish Orthodox Church, declared that Epiphanius was a layperson and not member of the clergy. He added that the grant of autocephaly to the OCU was a violation of the canon law.

On 2 April 2019, the Assembly of bishops of the POC released a communiqué. In it, it declared it reiterated its stance taken 9 May and 15 November 2018. The communiqué says the POC is in favor of granting autocephaly to Ukraine, and that autocephaly should be given "according to the dogmatic and canonical norms of the whole Church, and not of a group of schismatics. Those who left the Church and have been deprived of their priestly ordination, cannot represent a healthy ecclesial body. It is an uncanonical act, violating the Eucharistic and inter-Orthodox unity." In the same communiqué, the POC declared that when it received schismatics they were reordinated, however religious experts disagreed, saying that there is no documents or pictorial proofs proving the ordinations happened, and citing the case of bishops of the Lusitanian Orthodox Church who were accepted into the POC without reordinations.

Metropolitan Sawa send a letter for the 14th anniversary of Kirill's enthronement in which he stated "The enemy of faith does not like church stability, he tries to destroy it. What happened in Ukraine clearly shows this." On 4 February 2022, Metropolitan Sawa apologized for it stating that since the start of the war the POC would have seen the need for the independence of the Orthodox Church in Ukraine and had called Ecumenical Patriarch Bartholomew to hold a Pan-Orthodox Synod to resolve the problem.

=== Serbian Orthodox Church ===
In Metropolitan Amfilohije Radović prayed for "peace and brotherly love to the Ukrainian people" hoping that the "Ecumenical Patriarch will not accept or support this madness".

In August 2018, Patriarch Irinej, primate of the Serbian Orthodox Church (SOC), sent a letter to the Ecumenical Patriarch concerning the situation in Ukraine. In it, Irinej characterized as "very perilous or even catastrophic, probably as fatal for the unity of Holy Orthodoxy" the act "of exonerating and of restoring schismatics to the rank of bishops, especially the arch-schismatic ones, such as ‘patriarch’ Filaret Denysenko of Kyiv, and of bringing schismatics back into liturgical and canonical communion, without their repentance and their return to the unity of the Russian Orthodox Church from which they detached themselves. And all without the consent of the Moscow Patriarchate and without coordination with him" Irinej added he was afraid the schismatics of the Montenegrin Orthodox Church would also be legitimised despite the fact that Montenegro is under the jurisdiction of the Serbian Orthodox Church.

Not so long before the schism, head of the Serbian Orthodox Church, Patriarch Irinej, considered the presumable schism between Moscow and Constantinople would be the hardest of all those that have ever been, even greater quantitatively than the schism of 1054. He stated that the Serbian Church does not accept the existence of two Orthodox Christianities - "Fanariotic" (i.e. Constantinople's) and "Moscow's". He added his church did not stand for Moscow nor was against Constantinople, but supported the established order and opposed any decisions that would certainly lead to dire consequences. He also declared that if non-canonical churches were recognized, a similar phenomenon would happen "in Macedonia, but also in Montenegro, Abkhazia, and wherever the contracting authorities and perpetrators have imagined, even, perhaps, in Greece."

After the schism, Patriarch Irinej gave an interview in which he condemned the 11 October decision of the Ecumenical Patriarchate. In his opinion, this decision increases the risks of new divisions in the Local Churches, while the Ecumenical Patriarch had no right to recognize the schismatic church and grant it an autocephaly. Some Serbian Church officials also expressed concerns that this decision would be followed by recognition of the Macedonian Orthodox Church, which had split from the Serbian Orthodox Church in 1967 and hadn't received recognition at the time of the Moscow–Constantinople schism.

On 20 October 2018, the Serbian and Antiochian patriarchs made a common declaration in which they "appeal to their brother, His All Holiness the Ecumenical Patriarch, to restore the fraternal dialogue with the Orthodox Church of Russia in order to, with the fraternal assistance and participation of all the other primates of the Local Orthodox Autocephalous Churches, resolve the conflict between the Patriarchates of Constantinople and Moscow and to restore back the bond of peace in the Orthodox Church".

On 12 November 2018, the synod of the Serbian Orthodox Church published a communiqué in which they declared they considered the reinstatement of Filaret and Makariy as "non-binding for the Serbian Orthodox Church" and that they would therefore not communicate with them or their supporters. Synod also requested convocation of a Pan-Orthodox Synod over the issue.

The patriarch of the Serbian Orthodox Church wrote on his christmas encyclical: "If, in accordance with the logic of this world, autocephaly is understood in any other way, as an element of a state's sovereignty, national individuality or separateness, then it does not contribute to the unity and building up of the Church, but it rather invites self-sufficiency and living in isolation, and it becomes, paradoxically, a sin against the Holy Spirit. [...] The temptation is the same in our very close and brotherly Ukraine, where the passion filled chauvinist-Russophobes, led by corrupt politicians with the assistance of Uniates and, unfortunately, with the uncanonical cooperation of the Ecumenical Patriarchate, deepened and spread the existing schism and seriously jeopardized the unity of Orthodoxy in general."

On 29 January 2019, during a visit for the 10th anniversary of the enthronement of Patriarch Kirill of Moscow, Patriarch Irinej declared, among other things, that what is happening in Ukraine was comparable to a "bomb" thrown at Orthodoxy. On the same day, in an interview, he declared the Ukrainian question, in the 21st century, "can divide the Orthodox world and have serious repercussions."

On 5 February 2019, Orthochristian informed that "there will be separate Sunday of Orthodoxy celebrations in Chicago this year on March 17, [...] with the Serbian Church and ROCOR celebrating together separately from the Greek Metropolis." On 14 March the same source reported that the priests of the SOC "have been instructed not to serve with Constantinople clergy throughout America and Canada."

On 28 February, the DECR of the ROC published a statement of the Serbian Orthodox Church, in which the SOC told his position concerning the Ukrainian question. However, some religious experts began to have doubts on the authenticity of the statement as there was no hyperlinks to the original statement. On 13 March, the SOC published the same statement on its website. The SOC also sent its statement to all the local Orthodox churches. The head of the Serbian Church's Information and Publishing Department published a communiqué on 13 March in which he gave his personal opinion that "it is recommended, but not required, that Serbian hierarchs and clergy abstain from serving with those who have communion with the schismatics. Such a heavy decision as breaking communion can only be made by the Council of Bishops, not the Holy Synod, in the Serbian Orthodox Church."

The council of bishops of the SOC, held from May 9 to 18, 2019, decided not to recognize the OCU. The council of bishops also stated: "The biggest problem of the Orthodox Church today is the Church schism in Ukraine and the unsuccessful attempts of the Patriarchate of Constantinople to solve the problem "on the knee," unilaterally, without dialogue with the canonical Church in Ukraine and with the Russian Orthodox Church, and in general without pan-Orthodox consultations."

In June 2019, Metropolitan Amfilohije told TASS the only one to recognise the Montenegrin Orthodox Church is Filaret Denysenko of the UOC-KP but Constantinople will not recognise it as their archbishop Mihailo Dedeić previously worked for it and was dismissed for "his crimes".

In February 2020, Metropolitan Onufriy of the UOC-MP joined the 2019–2020 clerical protests in Montenegro. The SOC commented on it stating that "he and his four bishops will visit Montenegro, bring blessings to Ukrainian holy places, and support the Church [SOC] in the defense of holy places [in Montenegro]".

In 2022, Metropolitan Joanikije Mićović stated that the Russian invasion of Ukraine came from impiety, it is a "difficult situation" for the canonical UOC-MP and that he thinks "Montenegro was designed to be a small Ukraine".

The SOC has not commented on the presence of the Homeland Movement, the junior partner in the Croatian government, at an Orthodox Christmas celebration of the minor Croatian Orthodox Church in 2025.

=== Greek Orthodox Church of Antioch ===
On 6 October, the synod of the Greek Patriarchate of Antioch announced its support for a pan-Orthodox synaxis on the question of Ukraine's autocephaly.

On 20 October, the Serbian and Antiochian patriarchs made a common declaration in which they "appeal to their brother, His All Holiness the Ecumenical Patriarch, to restore the fraternal dialogue with the Orthodox Church of Russia in order to, with the fraternal assistance and participation of all the other primates of the Local Orthodox Autocephalous Churches, resolve the conflict between the Patriarchates of Constantinople and Moscow and to restore back the bond of peace in the Orthodox Church".

The primate of the Greek Orthodox Church of Antioch answered to the 24 December 2018 letter of the Ecumenical Patriarch, which asked the primates of the local churches to recognize the autocephaly of the Orthodox Church of Ukraine, by asking the Ecumenical Patriarch to postpone the grant of autocephaly to the Orthodox Church of Ukraine.

On 17 January 2019, Patriarch John X of Antioch declared he "fully supported" Russia on the question of Ukraine.

On 29 January 2019, at a meeting with Patriarch Kirill of Moscow, Patriarch John X declared: "We urged, and continue to urge, the Ecumenical patriarch and other supreme clergy to resolve existing problems, including those currently faced by our fraternal Russian Orthodox Church, through dialogue, through negotiation, through ordinary conversation".

On 1 February 2019, in a homily for the 10th anniversary of the enthronement of Kirill of Moscow, John X of Antioch expressed his "deep, heartily pain and great sorrow towards what is happening in our Orthodox Church these days and Her affliction as a result of individuality, lack of dialogue, and absence of conciliarity, and of what happened recently in Ukraine". John X also appealed to all the primates of the Orthodox autocephalous churches and said it was time "to gather and meet in order to proclaim our commitment to the unity of our Holy Orthodox Church, and our belief that Her light coming from the Light of Christ remains bright and glorious."

On 18 April 2019, the primates of the Church of Cyprus, the Church of Alexandria, the Church of Antioch, and the Church of Jerusalem gathered. They released a communiqué in which they write that among other things they "looked into the problems that arose after granting autocephaly to the Orthodox Church in Ukraine". The primates of Alexandria, Antioch and Jerusalem supported the "initiative of mediation" of the primate of the Church of Cyprus.

On 2 March 2022, the Holy Synod of the Church of Antioch released a statement, according to which its bishops "reiterated the position of the Patriarchate of Antioch stressing the necessity to return to the principle of consensus and unanimity of all Orthodox Churches [...] to find solutions to controversial issues challenging the Orthodox world" and expressed "their sympathy to the shepherds of the Ukrainian Orthodox Church presided by His Beatitude Metropolitan Onufriy" about the 2022 Russian invasion of Ukraine, omitting both the Russian involvement and the Orthodox Church of Ukraine led by Epiphanius.

=== Georgian Orthodox Church ===
On 30 September, the Georgian Orthodox Church published a statement on its website in which it encouraged the Patriarchates of Moscow and Constantinople to work together on the dispute over Ukraine.

Although Ukrainian parliament chairman Andriy Parubiy stated after an October 5 visit to Tbilisi that the Georgian Orthodox Church (GOC) was in support of Kiev, Georgian Patriarch Ilia II later denied this, and church spokesman Mikhail Botkoveli said: "We need more time to discuss the arguments of the Russian Orthodox Church, after which the Georgian Orthodox Church will announce its position". It is reported that there are sharp divisions within the Georgian Orthodox Church, which analysts see as "the most pro-Russian institution in an anti-Russian country". A major factor in the dispute within the GOC is the role of the Abkhazian Orthodox Church (AOC) which itself broke from the GOC, the Russian Orthodox Church has offered to mediate the dispute between the GOC and the AOC. Some clerics see this as a reason to maintain the goodwill of the Russian Orthodox Church and others viewed the Abkhazian church as already "under the control of Moscow"; some accused Moscow of hypocrisy, with one theologian arguing publicly that "The (Moscow) patriarchate is betraying the biblical principle of ‘do unto others as you would have them do unto you'".

After its synod of 27 December 2018, the GOC said it waited further developments and would declare its position in January 2019. According to a Metropolitan of the GOC, the GOC supports the Ukrainian autocephaly.

After the granting of autocephaly to the Orthodox Church of Ukraine (5 January 2019), officials of the GOC declared discussions concerning Ukrainian autocephaly would continue during subsequent meetings of the synod of the GOC. Some bishops of the GOC congratulated the Orthodox Church of Ukraine for its autocephaly.

On 29 January 2019, the GOC released a statement in which it stated that the main goal is now "to care for keeping the unity of Orthodox Church". Moreover, the statement reads: "The issuance of a tomos to the Ukrainian church drew various opinions in the entire Orthodox world, both in the secular world and in the clergy. We now have two parties that are defending their positions. None of the parties refrains from insults and blackmail".

On 29 January 2019, the GOC announced a delegation from the Ecumenical Patriarchate headed by Metropolitan Emmanuel of France was going to visit Georgia to discuss Ukraine's autocephaly. It is the Ecumenical Patriarchate which initiated the visit. On 30 January, after the meeting, Emmanuel of France declared: "We discussed the issue of the Ukrainian church's autocephaly and the tomos. Our purpose was to inform [each other] about some details, we didn't want for force any positions. It was just an information meeting. We know that the catholicos-patriarch has a lot of wisdom and can make the right decision".

A Georgian theologian wrote a letter to Metropolitan Hilarion, blaming the latter for using the authority of the Catholicos-Patriarch of Georgia to silence those who supported the recognition of the OCU by the GOC. Extract of the letter were published by Ukrinform on 5 February 2019.

On 24 March 2023, Catholicos-Patriarch Ilia II expressed his concern "about the current circumstances in the Ukrainian Orthodox Church" [UOC-MP] and called Ecumenical Patriarch Bartholomew to "help ease the tension" which means "creation of conditions for peaceful coexistence".

=== Romanian Orthodox Church ===
The Romanian Orthodox Church (BOR) on 26 October called for Constantinople to co-operate with Moscow in resolving the issue, and stated that "unity is preserved through co-responsibility and cooperation between the Local Orthodox Churches, by cultivating dialogue and synodality at the pan-Orthodox level, this being a permanent necessity in the life of the Church."

On 23 November 2018, the Ecumenical Patriarch arrived in Romania to lead the consecration of the Romanian People's Salvation Cathedral which was planned on Sunday 25 November; the Ecumenical Patriarch was officially welcomed by Patriarch Daniel of Romania. On Sunday 25 November, the Ecumenical Patriarch and Patriarch Daniel of Romania consecrated together the Romanian People's Salvation Cathedral. The Ecumenical Patriarch chaired the first mass of the Romanian People's Salvation Cathedral. Both the Ecumenical Patriarch Bartholomew and the Patriarch Daniel of Romania led the church service this day; it was the very first church service in the cathedral. The presence of Bartholomew and the absence of Patriarch Kirill of Moscow at the cathedral inauguration "appears to suggest that Romania is siding with Constantinople in the dispute."

To the questions: "Will Patriarch Kiril in Romania come to the sanctification of the painting?" and "How will the presence of His Holiness Bartholomew I affect the relationship between the ROC [Romanian Orthodox Church] and the Russian Patriarchate [Russian Orthodox Church]?", the Romanian Patriarchate spokesman Vasile Bănescu answered: "I am absolutely convinced that Patriarch Kiril will return to Romania on the occasion of the sanctification of the painting and will not withdraw because the ROC had the wisdom to plead for a dialogue to heal the wound of this separation between the Patriarchate of Constantinople and the Patriarchate of Moscow and All Russia. [...] We hope that this relationship, currently interrupted, will be resumed. The Romanian Patriarchate has a natural relationship with the Moscow Patriarchate and there are no tensions at the moment".

On 21 February 2019, the Holy Synod of the Romanian Orthodox Church discussed the Ukrainian question and declared in a communiqué:

Regarding this tense ecclesiastical situation in Ukraine, the Holy Synod of the Romanian Orthodox Church reiterates its stance expressed during its previous working sessions of 24 May and 25 October 2018. It was then recommended that, through dialogue, the Ecumenical Patriarchate and the Moscow Patriarchate identify a solution to this ecclesiastical dispute by preserving the unity of faith, by respecting the administrative and pastoral freedom of the clergy and faithful in this country (including the right to autocephaly), and by restoring Eucharistic communion. In the event of an unsuccessful bilateral dialogue, it is necessary to convene a Synaxis of all Primates of Orthodox Churches to solve the existing problem.

The Romanian Orthodox Church also stated in the same communiqué: that once the schism in Ukraine will have been healed, once the Ecumenical Patriarchate and the Moscow Patriarchate will have settled down their dispute over Ukraine, once the Romanian Orthodox Church will have "written assurances from Ukrainian ecclesiastical and state authorities that the ethnic and linguistic identity of [the 127 Romanian Orthodox parishes in Ukraine currently administered by the UOC-MP] will be respected, and that these Romanian Orthodox will have the possibility to organise themselves within a Romanian Orthodox Vicariate and to be able to cultivate spiritual relations with the Romanian Patriarchate", and once the Ecumenical Patriarchate will have clarified "the problem of the non-canonical hierarchs and priests in the West, who belonged to the former ‘Kiev Patriarchate’", then "the Holy Synod will express its official position on the situation of Orthodoxy in Ukraine."

Patriarch Daniel wrote the preface of the Romanian edition of the book "The Everyday Years 'Quests" by Russian Patriarch Kirill.

In October 2021, Metropolitan Nifon (Mihăiță) held a joint church service with Archbishop of Ternopil and Kremenets Nestor (Pysyk). An official recognition has not taken place as of May 2025.

Following the invasion of Ukraine, Archbishop Teodosie Petrescu claimed that Russian president Vladimir Putin "is not black as everyone presents him" and that he does not think he is a villain. In December 2024, the Holy Synod of the Romanian church announced an investigation for his political statements after he gave an interview in which Theodosie endorsed Călin Georgescu and called Putin a "person of reconciliation".

In October 2023, the Metropolis of Moldavia and Bukovina made a press release in which they reject the accusation of "canonical interference" by the Russian Metropolis of Chișinău and All Moldova. They also described the rise of Romanian citizenship as "natural process" and called the Metropolis of the ROC as "occupation structure". After Ukrainian Orthodox Church – Kyiv Patriarchate (UOC-KP) of Patriarch Filaret Denysenko founded an exarch in Moldova, a representative claimed that "such creatures [UOC-KP] are equivalent to sects."

In March 2024, the BOR started negotiations to gain control over the Romanian communities in Romania. After the OCU dismissed it and stressed their canonical jurisdiction over all Ukraine, the ROC stated that they would prioritize these in Bukovina which remained under the jurisdiction of UOC-MP. In October 2024, the Holy Synod of Romania criticized the indefinite postponement for the legal recognition of the "Romanian Orthodox Church of Ukraine" calling it "unjustified".

=== Albanian Orthodox Church ===
On 10 October, Archbishop Anastasios, head of the autocephalous Albanian Orthodox Church, (AOC) sent a letter to the Moscow Patriarch. Extracts of this letter have been published on 22 November on the official website of the Department of External Church Relations of the Russian Orthodox Church. In those extracts, the head of the Albanian Church declared that granting autocephaly to Ukraine was a "dangerous undertaking" and that "instead of the unity of Orthodox Christians in Ukraine, there has appeared a danger of schism in the unity of the universal Orthodoxy". He also said they should do everything to hold a pan-Orthodox Council.

The next day, the official website of the Albanian Orthodox Church published the full text of the letter of October 10, as well as the second letter, dated November 7, through the hosting service DocDroid, in English and in Greek. In his first letter, Archbishop Anastasios declared the 14 September decision of Moscow had "dangerously complicated the whole matter" concerning Ukraine - this passage had not been released among the extracts on the official website of the Department of External Church Relations of the Russian Orthodox Church. In his second letter, Archbishop Anastasios disagreed with the decisions of the Moscow Patriarchate to break communion with the Church of Constantinople, stating: "It is unthinkable that the Divine Eucharist [...] could be used as a weapon against another Church. [...] We proclaim it is impossible for us to agree to such decisions." He also added that recent developments have made the convocation of a Pan-Orthodox synaxis "extremely difficult" but that the Albanian Orthodox Church was willing to participate in it, if the Pan-Orthodox synaxis was convoked canonically. The second letter was not published by Moscow.

On 14 January 2019, the Holy Synod of the AOC sent a letter to Patriarch Bartholomew to ask the latter to hold a Pan-Orthodox council "as soon as possible" to prevent "the evident risk of a painful schism." The Holy Synod declared the ordinations performed by Filaret were "non-existent, void, deprived of the divine grace of the Holy Spirit. [...] It is recognized by all of Orthodoxy as a fundamental ecclesiological principle that the ordinations of schismatics and heretics, as "mysteries" performed outside of the Church, are invalid, so all the more so ordinations by someone who is deposed and excommunicated". The Ecumenical Patriarch answered with a letter containing arguments to prove the validity of the clergy of the OCU. On 21 March 2019, the Albanian Orthodox Church sent a new reply in which he gave counter arguments to the Ecumenical Patriarch's arguments.

On 15 November 2022, the Holy Synod of the AOC called for a Pan-Orthodox Synaxis while emphasizing that they "did not adopt a Russian point of view" and not "doubted the right of ekkleton nor the need for the granting of Autocephaly in Ukraine".

On 16 December 2024, the AOC denounced the "persecution, imprisonment, sacrilege of cult objects and confiscation of the property of churches and monasteries" following the Law of Ukraine "On the Protection of the Constitutional Order in the Field of Activities of Religious Organizations". In August, the AOC issued a statement where offered prayers for the repeal of the law.

In March 2025, newly-elected Archbishop of the AOC John stated in an interview with The National Herald his regret for granting autocephaly for the OCU calling it a "tragedy that divided many Churches" and that "[AOC] made every possible effort for reconciliation".

=== Orthodox Church of the Czech Lands and Slovakia ===
On 10 November, the head of the Orthodox Church of the Czech Lands and Slovakia (OCCLS), Archbishop Rastislav of Prešov, met with the head of the UOC-MP, Metropolitan Onufry. On this occasion, Archbishop Rastislav of Prešov declared his concern about the situation in Ukraine and condemned the Ecumenical Patriarchate's actions, stating that "it is impossible to create even a temporary good on the violation of the sacred canons of the Orthodox Church".

On 24 November, Archbishop of Prague of the OCCLS, Michael, met with Metropolitan Agafangel of Odessa of the UOC-MP. Said Archbishop of Prague declared to the UOC-MP members: "We have arrived to show our unity with you, as representatives of an autocephalous Church".

In the end of January 2019, the holy synod of the OCCLS asked for a pan-Orthodox meeting on the question of Ukraine to be held.

On 6 February 2019, commenting on the enthronement of Metropolitan Epiphanius, primate Rastislav of Prešov declared Epiphanius was an impostor and that the canonical head of the Orthodox church in Ukraine was Metropolitan Onuphry.

On 21 November 2019, Bishop Isaiah of Šumperk concelebrated with Epiphanius. In March 2022, Bishop Isaiah expressed lack of understanding "why the Russian Church doesn't give freedom to such a great nation" in reference to ROC's support for Putin. According to Bishop Isaiah, the eparchy of Olomouc-Brno (Moravia) does support the OCU while the eparchy of Prague (Bohemia) tends towards the ROC. Meanwhile, protopriest Jan Beránek stated that the churches are "inherently apolitical, as are their mutual relations."

On 3 April 2024, Metropolitan Rastislav Gont of the OCCLS condemned the "unjust and inexcusable persecution of the Ukrainian Orthodox Church [UOC-MP] by the Ukrainian state power [...] seeking to replace the canonical Church with schismatic structures [OCU]".

=== Bulgarian Orthodox Church ===
The Bulgarian Orthodox Church (BOC) first said it could not comment. On 15 December, Metropolitan Daniel (Nikolov) of Vidin, in an interview published on the official website of the BOC, declared the Ukrainian unification council was uncanonical and that the project to create an autocephalous church in Ukraine was only political.

On 17 May 2019, Metropolitan Daniel (Nikolov) of Vidin sent a letter to all the Metropolitans of the Church of Greece telling them that the actions of the Ecumenical Patriarch "destroy, threaten and damage the Orthodox Church's unity and catholicity. In our opinion, the Orthodox Church is at a crossroads: show its catholic wisdom and protect unity, holiness, universality and apostolicity, or choose the path of Eastern papism, repeating the sad history of 1054." However, the Holy Synod of the BOC declared on 12 June 2019 after its meeting that the letter of Metropolitan Daniel "is his personal view. The Holy Synod is categorically differentiated. In the questions raised by Metropolitan Daniel, the Synod has no solution."

On 12 June, due to the pro-ROC actions of Metropolitan Daniel (Nikolov) - the unauthorized distribution of anti-Constantinople letters to representatives of local churches and a trip to Moscow without the blessing of the Patriarch and the Synod, the Patriarch and the Synod having declared those actions harmed the Bulgarian Orthodox Church and the national security of Bulgaria -, both Bulgarian metropolites Nikolai of Plovdiv and Daniel (Nikolov) of Vidin announced they broke the Eucharistic communion between each others, refused to pray for each others, to recognize each others' existence and to serve each others. Allegedly, 75% of the BOC supports Nikolai of Plovdiv, while 25% supports Daniel of Vidin.

In August 2024, newly-elected-Patriarch Daniel said in a conversation with the US ambassador to Bulgaria that the "canonical" UOC-MP is experiencing "various restrictions" due to allegedly discriminatory policies, stressing the imposition of restrictions on religious freedom, freedom of worship, the forcible confiscation of church property and the promotion of hate speech.

=== Church of Jerusalem ===
On 18 April 2019, the primates of the Church of Cyprus, the Church of Alexandria, the Church of Antioch, and the Church of Jerusalem gathered. They released a communiqué in which they write that among other things they "looked into the problems that arose after granting autocephaly to the Orthodox Church in Ukraine". The primates of Alexandria, Antioch and Jerusalem supported the "initiative of mediation" of the primate of the Church of Cyprus.

On 16 May 2019, Patriarch of Jerusalem Theophilos III met with representatives of the Russian Imperial Orthodox Palestine Society. In his thank you speech, Theophilos III called the Church of Jerusalem "the Mother of all the Churches" and "the guarantor of the unity of the Orthodox Church". The Ecumenical Patriarchate claims to be the only guarantor of Orthodox unity.

On 1 May 2025, Patriarch Theophilos III called Estonia to reconsider the amendments to the "Churches and Congregations Act" "for the sake of all people of faith in Estonia" and sees it as "yet another example of the urgent need for unity."

=== Church of Greece ===
On 28 August 2019, the Standing Holy Synod of the Church of Greece stated that the Ecumenical Patriarch had the right to grant autocephaly, and that the primate of the Church of Greece had the "privilege" to "further deal with the question of recognition of the Church of Ukraine".

On 7 October 2019, "a day before the start of the proceedings of the Synod of the Hierarchy of the Church of Greece, [the Archbishop of Athene] informed in a letter the Body of Hierarchs that he would add another extraordinary meeting this coming Saturday regarding exclusively the Ukrainian issue." This meeting was scheduled for 12 October 2019.

On 12 October 2019, the Orthodox Church of Greece recognized the autocephaly of the Orthodox Church of Ukraine, stating that "the Ecumenical Patriarchate of Constantinople has the right to granting autocephalies" During the debate preceding the recognition, more than 35 Metropolitans of the Church of Greece declared they had been pressured by the ROC but did not yield to it. On 15 October the GoC released an official statement.

According to news media reports, it had been tentatively expected that the official recognition of the OCU would take place on 19 October "in Thessaloniki where Archbishop Ieronymos and Metropolitan Epiphanius w[ould] possibly concelebrate the Divine Liturgy." On 19 October, the Ecumenical Patriarch Bartholomew and Archbishop Ieronymos II of Athens jointly celebrated a liturgy in the Church of the Acheiropoietos in Thessaloniki, Greece, at which Metropolitan Epiphanius′ name was commemorated by the Patriarch. The fact was interpreted by Greek medias as a definitive acknowledgement (recognition) of Epiphanius by the Church of Greece. In his speech toward the end of the liturgy, Patriarch Bartholomew thanked Ieronymos II because, Bartholomew said, Ieronymos II "identified with the canonical decisions of the Ecumenical Patriarchate. He also wrote the name of Metropolitan Epiphanius of Kiev and All Ukraine on the pages of the Diptychs." A spokesman of the Moscow Patriarchate contested such interpretation pointing up the fact that Epiphanius' name was not said directly by the Archbishop.

On 21 October 2019, Archbishop Ieronymos II, the primate of the Church of Greece, sent a peaceful letter to Metropolitan Epiphanius, the primate of the OCU. The Archbishop′s letter meant that the Church of Greece had officially communicated to the OCU that the Church of Greece had recognized it.

=== Unrecognized or partially recognized Orthodox churches ===
==== Ukrainian Orthodox Church – Kyiv Patriarchate ====
On 19 September 2019, Patriarch Filaret of the Ukrainian Orthodox Church – Kyiv Patriarchate claimed that the Pan-Orthodox Council gave Ecumenical Patriarch Bartholomew special power above than the first among equals and that OCU is only autocephalous on paper while being a de facto Metropolis of the Patriarchate of Constantinople.

On 28 February 2022, the UOC-KP called the UOC-MP to join "a single local autocephalous Ukrainian Orthodox Church" in face of Russian invasion and "contribution to this madness" by the leadership of the Russian Orthodox Church.

On 21 August 2024, Patriarch Filaret endorsed Law 8371 calling the UOC-MP, UOC-KP and OCU to unite.

==== Abkhazian Orthodox Church and Holy Metropolis of Abkhazia ====
On 22 October 2018, the unrecognized Abkhazian Orthodox Church (AOC) declared in an official statement: "We raise a prayer voice, because the actions of the Patriarchate of Constantinople, which are aimed at taking the Orthodox Church all over the world, violate church canons. Such an initiative of Patriarch Bartholomew will lead to a catastrophe for the Slavic peoples and the entire Orthodox world." On 5 June 2024, Catholicos Vissarion Aplaa wrote a letter to Patriarch Kirill to accept Abkhazia "under his omophorion resolve the question of its canonical structure." On 25 March 2025, Catholicos Vissarion Aplaa of the AOC declared that he is ready to open negotiations with the ROC and Georgian Orthodox Church (GOC) and that he does not thinks that the GOC would recognize the OCU in revenge. After Dorotheos of the Holy Metropolis of Abkhazia rejected the invitation to a meeting sent on 12 May 2025, the Church Council of the AOC accused him of "ignor[ing] the call for unity in the Abkhazian Church" and "refusing to submit to the canonical decisions".

On 19 September 2018, Archimandrite Dorotheos of the rival Holy Metropolis of Abkhazia stated "the solution of the canonical status of the Ukrainian Church will help to resolve similar church problems, including Abkhazian one" and stated that he sees "no threat of the “Great Schism”". On 10 May 2021, Archimandrite Dorotheos stated that the Holy Metropolis has "no canonical powers to [...] recognize autocephaly" but that he personally "consider[s] the Orthodox Church of Ukraine absolutely canonical" and thinks that "the time will come, and the Ukrainian Church will be represented fully in the family of Orthodox churches." In 2024, Archimandrite Dorotheos expressed his doubts in the success of the negotiations with the GOC and ROC stating that "only when relations between the local Orthodox churches, especially the ROC and Constantinople, are normalized" it would be possible to "forc[e] the GOC to solve the Abkhaz church issue." Hierodeacon David (Sarsania) rejected claims that that Holy Metropolis is controlled by Constantinople as they "never planned to establish the Constantinople exarchate in Abkhazia" and the formation took place "long before the non-canonical actions of the Patriarchate of Constantinople in Ukraine". According to him there are three options, to return to the GOC which believers would oppose, the preferred option by the public to cooperate with the ROC to gain some sort of independence or Dorotheos' plan to seek "an inter-Orthodox commission under the chairmanship of the Ecumenical Patriarch" which is not supported by the majority either according to David. Said hierodeacon later returned to the AOC triggering a conflict between the factions.

==== Macedonian Orthodox Church ====
As of October 2018, the unrecognized Macedonian and Montenegrin Orthodox churches have stated that they cannot yet comment.

In October 2018, the Macedonian Orthodox Church – Ohrid Archbishopric (MOC-AC) has asked to be canonically recognized by the Ecumenical Patriarch but was met with a harsh refusal, "Constantinople insisted on drawing a distinction between the situation with the Ukrainian Church and the Macedonian church [… :] Constantinople had never given up its own jurisdiction over Ukraine in favour of Moscow, whereas it did so with the Macedonian eparchies in favour of the Serbian Church in 1922, when a Macedonian state did not exist."

In November 2020, Parthenius of Antania gave an to the Ukrainian Relihiyna Pravda news agency in which he expressed his gratitude for that "all Orthodox Ukrainians are in canonical unity with the One, Holy, Catholic and Apostolic Church". Parthenius stated that it would have been better if the UOC-MP joined to unification council of the Eastern Orthodox churches of Ukraine and prayed for the end of ecclesiastic divisions and for the restoration of "ancient canonical order [...], which has the Constantinople Church as its Primary Throne".

In MOC-AC rejoined the SOC in 2022 and was officially granted autocephaly in return the same year ending the schism, traditionally only the Ecumenical Patriarch can grant autocephaly. Following this, MOC-AC joined SOC's opposition towards the OCU. In 2024, Primate Stefan rejected Constantinople's conditions for independence which included a name change and the recognition of the OCU. The Constantinople and Church of Greece accepted them into the communion but refused to recognize their independence. The ROC, UOC, BOC, POC, OCCLS, Church of Antioch and the BOR recognized it.

On 9 June 2024, Metropolitans Gregory (Nasteski) and Peter (Karevski) refused to serve with Cyprian of Stara Zagora of the BOC after he served with hierarchs of the OCU.

The MOC-AC later condemned the ban of the UOC-MP following the Law of Ukraine "On the Protection of the Constitutional Order in the Field of Activities of Religious Organizations".

==== Montenegrin Orthodox Church ====
Metropolitan Mihailo Dedeić of the Montenegrin Orthodox Church in November 2018 called on the Montenegrin government to solve the [Montenegrin] church problem as with the Orthodox Church of Ukraine.

With the blessing of the Metropolitan, Archimandrite Boris Bojović participated in the 19th anniversary of the reconstruction of the St. Michael's Golden-Domed Monastery which belongs to the OCU in May 2019.

In June 2019, Bishop Boris described the OCU as a role model for "the path to a just organization and position of the church in its home country is long and thorny" but "through intelligent work and action, regain its autocephaly, unjustly abolished a century ago."

In April 2021, Metropolitan Mihailo called "all citizens to resist this evil before the evil reaches us" after Prime Minister Zdravko Krivokapić announced his intention to sign a deal with the Serbian Orthodox Church.

In April 2022, Metropolitan Mihailo claimed that Metropolitan Joanikije Mićović's comments that "Montenegro is projected to be a small Ukraine" are calls for "evil and misfortune" in Montenegro.

In April 2024, His successor Metropolitan Boris took part in a conference with Ukrainian Greek Catholic Church, OCU, Latin Church in Ukraine, UOC-MP and the German Evangelical Lutheran Church of Ukraine with the title "Overcoming the Horrors of the War" where he denounced the "discriminat[ion] [of his church] by the current authorities in Montenegro, which are oriented towards Moscow."

==== Orthodox Church in America ====
On 26 October, Metropolitan Tikhon, head of the Orthodox Church in America (OCA) issued an archpastoral letter in which he supported the idea of a pan-Orthodox synaxis on the question of Ukraine. On 28 January 2019, the Holy Synod of the OCA, its primate included, issued an Archpastoral Letter on Ukraine. In this letter, the OCA declared it had decided:

* To continue to recognize and support Metropolitan Onufriy as the canonical head and Primate of the Ukrainian Orthodox Church;

- To withhold, with several of our sister Churches, recognition of the Orthodox Church of Ukraine;
- That no changes be made to the diptychs, noting that the Orthodox Church in America has not been formally requested to make such changes;
- That communion between clergy and faithful of all canonical Orthodox jurisdictions in North America be maintained and that any specific questions concerning the concelebration of clergy be directed to the local diocesan bishop; and
- That our clergy and faithful preserve an attitude of sobriety and restraint in any public discussions of these matters.

In a 16 May 2019 encyclical, the Holy Synod of Bishops of the OCA reaffirmed its position taken in its 28 January 2019 pastoral letter.

In March 2023, Metropolitan Tikhon condemned the Russian invasion of Ukraine while reaffirming his support for Metropolitan Onufriy and his UOC-MP which according to Tikhon fell victim to "generalized religious persecution".

== Churches under the jurisdiction of the Russian Orthodox Church ==
=== Belarusian Orthodox Church ===
On 11 September 2018, the synod of the Belarusian Orthodox Church (the Exharcate of the Russian Orthodox Church in Belarus) issued a statement proclaiming their "unanimous support" for the position of Patriarch Kirill of Moscow, protesting the actions of the Ecumenical Patriarchate.

On 5 October, the Metropolitan Paul (Ponomaryov) of the Belarusian Orthodox Church "urge[d] the Patriarch Bartholomew [of Constantinople] and the synod of the Church of Constantinople to review their decisions and do everything possible to either disavow the previous decision or withdraw it, stopping this process, which [...] is taking absolutely distinct forms of church schism throughout Eastern Orthodoxy[.]"

After the schism the Belarusian Orthodox Church has not released an official statement about the break of communion with the Ecumenical Patriarchate. Since it is the exarchate of the Russian Orthodox Church, it obeys the decisions of the Holy Synod of the ROC.

=== Metropolis of Chișinău and All Moldova ===
In April 2019, the Metropolis of Chișinău and All Moldova condemned the actions of the Ecumenical Patriarchate in Ukraine.

After the start of the Russian invasion of Ukraine, there has seen a significant number of parishes switching affiliation from the Moscow to the Metropolis of Moldavia and Bukovina. A potential switch to the Romanian Patriarchate would not be discussed according to Ioan Moșneguțu as the "clergy and the people remain faithful to the Orthodox Church of Moldova and Metropolitan Vladimir." In October 2023, Metropolis accused their Romanian counterparts of "canonical interference".

On 7 September 2024, Metropolitan Vladimir expressed his concern after MP Vasile Șoimaru called for a law similar to the Law of Ukraine "On the Protection of the Constitutional Order in the Field of Activities of Religious Organizations" in Moldova.

=== Russian Orthodox Church Outside Russia ===
On 25 September 2018, the Russian Orthodox Church Outside Russia (an autonomous church of the Moscow Patriarchate) (ROCOR) "suspended concelebration with the bishops of the Constantinople Patriarchate and participation in the work of the Episcopal Assemblies with their membership".

On 10 October 2018, the Russian Orthodox Church Outside Russia has "express[ed] [its] profound indignation at the blatant violation of the Holy Canons by the Orthodox Church of Constantinople. The decision of its hierarchy to send its ‘exarchs’ into the canonical territory of the Ukrainian Orthodox Church, without the agreement and permission of His Holiness Patriarch Kirill of Moscow and All Russia and His Beatitude Metropolitan Onufry of Kiev and All Ukraine, is a gross and unprecedented incursion by one Local Church into a distant canonical territory[.]"

On 18 October 2018, the Russian Orthodox Church Outside Russia has expressed "complete support of the position taken by the Holy Synod of the Patriarchate of Moscow, following its meeting of 15th October 2018" and severed Eucharistic communion with the Ecumenical Patriarchate.

On 8 December 2018, the ROCOR released a communiqué in which it states that if fully supports Onufriy and considers the Ecumenical Patriarchate's actions in Ukraine as illegal.

=== Diocese of Chersonesus ===
The Diocese of Chersonesus is an archidiocese under the jurisdiction of the Moscow Patriarchate. The Archdiocese of Chersonesus, at that time, took charge of the Orthodox communities of the Moscow Patriarchate in France, Swiss, Portugal and Spain. On 22 November 2018, during its annual session, the Archdiocese of Chersonesus unanimously declared its support of the decision made by the ROC on 15 October 2018 to break communion with Constantinople. On the next day, this decision was announced through an official communiqué on the diocese's official website in which they stated that the action of the Ecumenical Patriarch in Ukraine was "anti-canonical".

=== Diocese of Berlin and Germany ===
After a meeting on the 29 November 2018 between the Diocese of Berlin and Germany of the ROC and the German diocese of the Russian Orthodox Church Outside Russia, both decided to follow the decision of the ROC to sever eucharistic communion with the Ecumenical Patriarchate.

As a result of the decision to sever communion with the Ecumenical Patriarchate taken by the Russian Orthodox Church on October 15, 2018, Archbishop Mark of the German diocese of the ROCOR announced that the ROCOR would resign from participation in the Assembly of Canonical Orthodox Bishops of Germany (OBKD). On December 5, the OBKD held its autumn plenary assembly in Bonn without the members of the two Russian Orthodox dioceses of Germany (the German diocese of the ROCOR and the ROC diocese of Berlin and Germany). The Secretary General of the OBKD, Nikolaus Thon of the ROC, did not attend at the meeting and had therefore to be temporarily replaced by the Serbian Orthodox Archpriest Radomir Kolundzic. The present bishops of the Greek, Romanian and Serbian Orthodox dioceses of Germany regretted the absence of the Russian bishops and expressed the hope of "overcoming intra-Orthodox tensions," says their communiqué.

On 18 February 2019, the ROCOR published on its official websites a letter by Archbishop Mark of the German diocese of the Russian Orthodox Church Outside Russia; the letter was addressed to the Assembly of Orthodox Bishops in Germany. In this letter, Mark declared that he writes the letter to "clarify" the position of his diocese "on the current developments among the Orthodox." In his letter, Mark writes that "The unity of the Orthodox in Germany, which is currently represented through the OBKD (Assembly of Orthodox Bishops in Germany), is extremely valuable [...] And yet, all that we have built so far now is threatened by the current developments in Ukraine (see the Statement of our Diocese Counsel from 25.09.2018.)." Mark thereafter announced the decision that they "have determined to withdraw the representatives of our diocese from all committees for which the OBKD is responsible and in which their clergy preside as subjects of the Patriarchate of Constantinople. In particular, we will stop sending representatives to the Commission on Theology and Education, and we will suspend our participation in the meetings of the OBKD." The ROC published Mark's letter on its official websites.

=== Diocese of Lithuania ===
In April 2022, Metropolitan Innocence called Remigijus Šimašius' comments, that the Lithuanian Orthodox Church would illegally belong to the ROC and the churches should return to Constantinople like before 1686, "evocative and provocative" and even a risk to the "stability of Lithuanian society".

In May 2022, the Diocese asked Moscow to grant it autonomy. The ROC appointed to committee to consider it.

In December 2022, the press service of the Eparchy stressed that "all decisions are taken in Lithuania" and that their ties to the ROC are "only canonical".

=== Secessionist branches ===
==== Latvian Orthodox Church ====
In November 2019, the Latvian Orthodox Church (LOC-MP) dismissed claims that LOC-MP would transfer itself to the jurisdiction of the Ecumenical Patriarchate as it applies to the Latvian Orthodox Autonomous Church (LAOC) which was registered in October. The LOC-MP claimed that "all these fictions are directed not only against the Latvian Orthodox Church, but also against every Orthodox person in Latvia" and LAOC's founder Archbishop Victor "is not considered an Orthodox person and has nothing to do with the Holy Orthodoxy."

In September 2022, the Saeima adopted amendments to the Law on the Latvian Orthodox Church (LOC-MP) affirming the full independence. The LOC-MP clarified that:

The state established the status of our Church as autocephalous. The state has determined that the Latvian Orthodox Church is legally independent from any ecclesiastical center located outside of Latvia, maintaining spiritual, prayerful and liturgical communion with all canonical Orthodox churches of the world. The change of status does not change the Orthodox faith, the doctrines, the liturgical life of the Church, the calendar, the sacred liturgical language, the rituals, the traditions and the inner church life.

==== Estonian Orthodox Church ====
In 2022, Estonian Orthodox Church of the Moscow Patriarchate (EOC-MP) officials condemned 2022 Russian invasion of Ukraine and speech of Patriarch Kirill of Moscow by September 25, 2022.

On August 20, 2024, the EOC-MP declared unilaterally their autocephaly.

On 10 January 2025, the holy synod of the EOC-MP decided to rename "Estonian Christian Orthodox Church" (Estonian: Eesti Kristlik Õigeusu Kiri). A request to legally change their name to was denied as the Tartu County Court ruled that name change does not reflect its activities. In the application for the name change Archbishop Daniel stressed the local identity and church's commitment to operating in accordance with the laws of the Republic of Estonia.

On 9 April 2025, the Riigikogu passed a bill banning ties of churches to the ROC. EOC-MP emphasized that follow the Estonian law and even though the law does not restrict religious freedom outright that the law "very directly restricts [EOC-MP's] religious freedom". The rejected a merger with the Estonian Apostolic Orthodox Church (EAOC) which is under the jurisdiction of the Ecumenical Patriarchate and Archbishop Daniel argued that the offered vicar status would downgrade EOC-MP's status by two levels. Abbess Filareta of the Pühtitsa Convent wrote to President Alar Karis claiming religious freedom had been dealt a serious blow and asked for the law to not be promulgated.

On 24 April 2025, EOC-MP thanked President Alar Karis to said law insisting that their church "has shown loyalty to the Estonian state and respect for the people, supporting democratic values, one of which is religious freedom" and that "canonical communication with its Mother-Church [ROC] does not pose a threat to national security".

==== Ukrainian Orthodox Church (Moscow Patriarchate) ====
On 13 September, secretary for Inter-Orthodox Affairs of the Department for External Church Relations of the ROC, Archpriest Igor Yakimchuk, urged the UOC-MP believers to unite around Metropolitan Onufriy. The dioceses who pledged support to Onufriy were (in chronological order): Rivne, Odessa, Zaporizhia, Poltava, Sievierodonetsk, Kamianske, Kharkiv, Luhansk, Oleksandriya, Mukachevo, Zhytomyr, Kropyvnytsky, Chernihiv, Crimea, Izium, Nova Kakhovka, Mykolaiv, and Nizhyn. The three dioceses of Sumy, Konotop, and Romny, also declared their support for Onufriy.

On 24 October, the Department of External Church Relations of the Russian Orthodox Church published on its website an interview with the head of the Ukrainian Orthodox Church (Moscow Patriarchate), Metropolitan Onufry; this interview was previously published by the Information and Education Department of the Ukrainian Orthodox Church. In the interview, Onufry said that "[i]f the Tomos on the Patriarch of Constantinople's recognition of the schismatics is granted, then it will generate new schisms, larger and deeper. These schisms will affect not only our Ukraine – they will affect the whole world Orthodox Church."

On 13 November, the synod of the UOC-MP (an autonomous church of the Moscow Patriarchate) officially declared in a resolution that they considered the 11 October declaration of the Ecumenical Patriarchate "invalid" and canonically "null and void", and that the communion between the UOC-MP and the Ecumenical Patriarchate "is deemed impossible at present and thereby ceases". Two bishops of the UOC-MP did not sign the resolution, one of them being Metropolitan Simeon of Vinnytsia and Bar.

In an interview given on 14 November to the Vinnytsia Press Club, Metropolitan Simeon of Vinnytsia and Bar of the UOC-MP said he did not sign the UOC-MP resolution as he disagreed with some statements in the resolution and considered this resolution as "bad". He also said he would participate in the unification council. On 15 November, most of the clergy of Vinnytsia of the UOC-MP met in emergency, spontaneously and without the prior consent of its hierarchy. Most of the clergy of Vinnytsia publicly expressed its support to the 13 November resolution of the UOC-MP, and made an appeal to Metropolitan Simeon to ask him to hold a general meeting of the Vinnytsia eparchy. On 17 November, in a sermon, Metropolitan Simeon clarified that his refusal was his own decision, because, he stated, "not a single bishop represented the opinion of his eparchy or people at the Council, everyone spoke for themselves". On 20 November, an official monthly general meeting of the Vinnytsia eparchy chaired by Metropolitan Simeon was held; the Eparchial Council "categorically condemned the unauthorized assemblies held in the Vinnytsia eparchy" and "stated that the Resolution of the Bishops’ Council of the Ukrainian Orthodox Church, taken on November 13, 2018, is a document binding on all bishops, clergy and laity of the UOC and confirmed its readiness to comply with the Resolution by the entire Vinnytsia eparchy."

On 16 November 2018 Metropolitan Sophroniy (Dmitruk) of Cherkasy and Kaniv in his interview to BBC expressed his support for the creation of an autocephalous Church in Ukraine. He also said that he was going to participate in the unification council, and perhaps he would join the new autocephalous Church.

On 20 November 2018, chancellor of the UOC-MP, Metropolitan Anthony of Boryspil and Brovary, declared in an interview that "[s]anctions will be applied to the members of the Ukrainian Orthodox Church [of the Moscow Patriarchate] who participate in the 'Unification Council'".

On 7 December, the UOC-MP synod declared the unification council conveyed by the Ecumenical Pariarchate as unlawful.

On 17 December 2018, it was reported by Ukrinform (a Ukrainian State news outlet) that the Federal Security Service of Russia, along with members of the Moscow Patriarchate, had created mobile groups to prevent communities in Ukraine from switching from the UOC-MP to the OCU. Thoses groups are present in each diocoese of the UOC-MP and are composed of a lawyer and several sporty men.

On 3 April 2019, the synod of the UOC-MP issued a statement on the situation in the Ukrainian and world Orthodoxy. In said statemement, the UOC-MP "calls upon Patriarch Bartholomew of Constantinople to admit its [sic] mistake, rescind the tomos granted to the [...] "Orthodox Church of Ukraine," and begin correcting its [sic] mistake."

On 4 January 2020, Metropolitan Onufriy compared in a letter to Patriarch of SOC Irinej the amendments to the Montenegrin "Law on Freedom of Religion" to Ukraine "where the position of the schismatics [MOC in Montenegro and OCU in Ukraine], who are actually a minority in our country, was presented as the voice of the whole Ukrainian believing people while the voice of the canonical Ukrainian Orthodox Church, which unites millions of believers, was ignored."

===== Russian invasion =====
In May 2022, the Council of bishops of the UOC-MP has cutting ties with ROC over handling, perceived betrayal, and consequences of the 2022 Russian invasion of Ukraine.

In October 2023, the UOC-MP opposed the draft of the Law of Ukraine "On the Protection of the Constitutional Order in the Field of Activities of Religious Organizations", arguing that the draft law does not comply with the European Convention on Human Rights and the Constitution of Ukraine, and accused the draft of deliberately trying to pass the UOC-MP off as the Russian Orthodox Church. After the final adoption of the draft law on August 20, 2024, Metropolitan Kliment (Vecherya) declared "the Ukrainian Orthodox Church will continue to live as a true church. Maybe the Ukrainian Orthodox Church forbids the Moscow Patriarchate, but the Ukrainian Orthodox Church does not have a Moscow Patriarchate." He also compared the law to the "communist past".

== Churches under the jurisdiction of the Ecumenical Patriarchate ==
=== Estonian Apostolic Orthodox Church ===
In September 2024, the Estonian Apostolic Orthodox Church (EAOC) stated they would be willing to assist Estonian Orthodox Church of the Moscow Patriarchate (EOC–MP) to break free of "Moscow yoke" by offering them vicar status. The church stated that there would currently be a "historic opportunity" to start a gradual process toward uniting the two orthodox churches.

On 13 March 2025, Metropolitan Stephanos of Tallinn condemned the ideology of Russkiy mir calling it "provocative, expansionist, and fundamentally un-Christian". He defended the amendments to the "Churches and Congregations Act" stating that "it does not intend to halt the religious life of the parishes but calls for a cessation of communion with Moscow". He repeated the vicar status offer to the EOC–MP which would mean that they commemorate him instead of Patriarch Kirill of the ROC but stated that he has "no intention of subordinating their Church to ours".

On 10 April 2025, the EAOC welcomed the amendments to the "Churches and Congregations Act" passed by the Riigikogu which bans "influence of hostile states or extremist organisations" and stated that the bill will "partly help restor[ing] the situation that prevailed in Estonia before World War II" under a "common Orthodox church that was canonically part of the Ecumenical Patriarch of Constantinople". They offered their rival EOC–MP vicar status if they broke with the ROC.

=== Archdiocese of Russian Orthodox Churches in Western Europe ===
The Archdiocese of Russian Orthodox Churches in Western Europe (AROCWE) was an exarchate of the Ecumenical Patriarchate, its primate at the time the archidiocese's dissolution was announced was Archbishop John (Renneteau). On 18 October 2018, in reaction to the 15 October decision of the Russian Orthodox Church to sever communion with the Ecumenical Patriarchate, the AROCWE released a communiqué. In this communiqué, the AROCWE declared that the AROCWE, "Archdiocese-Exarchate under the jurisdiction of the Ecumenical Patriarchate", was "in full communion with the whole Orthodox Church. Indeed, the Ecumenical Patriarchate did not break communion with the Patriarchate of Moscow and continues to commemorate it according to the order of the diptychs. All the Orthodox faithful can therefore participate fully in the liturgical and sacramental life of our parishes." The communiqué concluded by asking all the priests, deacons, monks, nuns and faithful of the AROCWE to pray for the unity of the Church.

On 21 November, the rector of the Russian Church of the Transfiguration in Stockholm expelled 16 faithfuls from the parish because after the 15 October they had publicly "ceased to recognize the legitimacy and spiritual authority of [...] Ecumenical Patriarch Bartholomew and [...] Archbishop John of Chariopoulis".

==== Defection of the Russian Orthodox Church of the Nativity of Christ ====
On Sunday 28 October 2018, the Archpriest George Blatinsky of the AROCWE, rector of the Russian Orthodox Church of the Nativity of Christ and Saint Nicholas the Thaumaturge in Florence, ceased commemorating during the liturgy the canonical authorities to whom he is responsible, the Ecumenical Patriarch and the archbishop of the AROCWE John of Charioupolis. At the end of the celebration, Blatinsky told the faithful present that from that Sunday onward the parish had been placed under the jurisdiction of Metropolitan Hilarion of the Russian Orthodox Church Outside Russia (ROCOR) of the Patriarchate of Moscow. He justified this change of jurisdiction by saying that the Ecumenical Patriarchate had fallen into "schism" as a result of its intervention in Ukraine. According to the AROCWE's information, this decision, which was taken unilaterally by George Blatinsky, was thereafter been presented as being the result of a unanimous vote of a "general assembly of the parish", which was contrary to ecclesiastical norms and the civil statutes of the parish since no assembly had been convened for that day in accordance with the rules. Metropolitan Hilarion of the ROCOR assured archpriest George Blatinsky by telephone that he did not need any letter of canonical release from the AROCWE in order to be received into the ROCOR's jurisdiction since, according to Met. Hilarion, "all those who depend on Constantinople are schismatics".

Archbishop John imposed the sanctions of a ban a divinis (suspension of priestly functions), which took effect on 1 November 2018, upon Archpriest George Blatinsky and Priest Oleg Turcan, the second priest of the parish; on 1 November, a communiqué announcing their suspension was published on the AROCWE's official websites. Archbishop John also sent a letter of protestation to Metropolitan Hilarion of the ROCOR, in New York, on 5 November 2018. On 22 November, the AROCWE released a communiqué explaining the situation; in said communiqué, the AROCWE also published the letter Archbishop John had sent to Metropolitan Hilarion of the ROCOR, in French, Russian and English, and said the AROCWE had not yet received an answer from Metropolitan Hilarion of the ROCOR.

==== Defection of the Russian Orthodox church of Sanremo ====
On 23 January 2019, the Greek Metropolitan Gennadios of Italy suspended a divinis father Denis Baykov, rector of the Orthodox Church of Christ the Saviour, St. Catherine the Martyr, and St. Seraphim of Sarov, in Sanremo, Italy. This priest and this church were part of the AROCWE. The reason for the suspension were unspecified "anticanonical actions".

On 24 January 2019, the same Orthodox Church of Christ the Savior, the Great Martyr Catherine, and St. Seraphim of Sarov left the Ecumenical Patriarchate to join the ROCOR, along with the same father Denis Baikov as rector of said church.

On 4 February, the parishioners of the church voted unanimously to be transferred to the ROCOR. In an open letter, the rector of the church, Denis Baikov, called the AROCWE to join the ROCOR.

==== Dissolution of the archdiocese ====
The Ecumenical Patriarchate decided on 27 November to dissolve the AROCWE; however, after a vote on 23 February 2019 the General Assembly of the AROCWE refused the dissolution with 206 voters voting against the dissolution and 15 voting in favor of the dissolution. A new assembly may possibly be held in June to choose a jurisdiction.

=== American Carpatho-Russian Orthodox Diocese ===
2 priests of the American Carpatho-Russian Orthodox Diocese left the Ecumenical Patriarchate to join the Russian Orthodox Church Outside of Russia in response to the Ecumenical Patriarchate's decision concerning Ukraine.

=== Greek Orthodox Metropolis of Germany ===
On October 16, the head of the Greek Orthodox Metropolis of Germany published a statement on the Metropolis' website saying: "With disappointment and grief I have noted yesterday's decision of the Holy Synod of the Moscow Patriarchate to sever the eucharistic communion with the Ecumenical Patriarchate, whose metropolitan in Germany I am. [...] As was the case then, this time too applies: particularly affected are the parishes in the so-called diaspora, where there is a coexistence between the two patriarchates, in other words also in Germany. [...] As far as Ukraine is concerned, it is the common concern of all Orthodox Christians how to succeed in solving ecclesiastical cleavages ecclesiastically, not politically; it has to be non-violent and effective. This is the determined and irrevocable intention of the Ecumenical Patriarchate of Constantinople, which, as a mother church, has the right to do so and, I believe, is obliged to have the daughter Ukraine grown up into self-employment. That the older daughter Moscow does not recognize it is regrettable."

=== Ukrainian Orthodox Church in Diaspora ===
In early 2018, the Permanent Conference of Ukrainian Orthodox Bishops Beyond the Borders of Ukraine, which consists of Ukrainian Autocephalous Orthodox Church in Diaspora (UAOCD), Ukrainian Orthodox Church of the USA (UOC of USA), Ukrainian Orthodox Church of Canada (UOCC) and the Ukrainian Orthodox Eparchies of Brasil and South America, released a statement where they stated their "strong [...] support for the actions strong letter of support for the actions" of the Ecumenical Patriarch.

=== Metropolis of Belgium ===
Metropolitan Athenagoras of Belgium, head of the Metropolis of Belgium of the Ecumenical Patriarchate, declared his support for the Ecumenical Patriarchate in a speech, saying: "the Ecumenical Patriarchate has never disrupted or divided the unity of the Orthodox Christians... The unity of our Church is tested today. Our ecclesiastic history has also been tested in the past, but we overcame the difficulties with the help of our Lord. Our Ecumenical Patriarchate, due to the rights provided by our tradition and the history of our Church, had taken the same initiative for so many other Orthodox sister Churches. Why not do the same with the Church of Ukraine?..."

=== Exarchate in Lithuania ===
Priest Gintaras Sungaila of the Exarchate of the Ecumenical Patriarchate in Lithuania accused the Lithuanian Orthodox Church of trying to hide their ties to the ROC as "majority of people support Ukraine, condemn Russia’s aggression, and consider Patriarch Kirill’s position immoral and reprehensible."

=== Mount Athos ===
It was planned that Epiphanius would be enthroned on 3 February 2019, which is also the date of his 40th birthday. The monasteries of Mount Athos refused to send a delegation for the enthronement ceremony "not because the Fathers do not recognize its legitimacy or canonicity, but because they have chosen to stick with what has become official practice and accept invitations only to the enthronement of their ecclesiastical head, the Ecumenical Patriarch." Two abbots of Mount Athos were planned to come at the enthronement but were to be part of the delegation of the Ecumenical Patriarchate. On 1 February, once in Kyiv, Archimandrite Ephrem, one of the two Athonite abbots, was hospitalized for a heart attack. On 2 February, Archimandrite Ephrem was visited by Metropolitan Epiphanius.

As planned, Epiphanius was enthroned on 3 February 2019, in Saint Sophia Cathedral, Kyiv. Archimandrite Ephrem, who had been hospitalized on 1 February 2019, was not present at the ceremony of enthronement, but a hieromonk of Ephrem's monastery was present during the ceremony of enthronement. A monk from a skete of the Koutloumousiou Monastery was also present during the ceremony of enthronement.

On 8 February 2019, a delegation of the OCU visited the Mount Athos and celebrated divine liturgy there. The visit was, the OCU reports, "at the invitation of the Ecumenical Patriarchate". Against claim of "Russian propaganda" that the Russian St. Panteleimon Monastery had closed its doors to the OCU delegation, the OCU declared they had entered into the St. Panteleimon Monastery and that "Nobody closed any gate neither before us, nor for us".

On 12 February 2019, the community of the Mount Athos released a communiqué on which it declared: "We remain on the side of the Ecumenical Patriarchate and we will not tolerate its humiliation [...] Besides, we are not a Church, and we are not called upon to make a decision on recognition. [...] What is important is to maintain the unity of the Holy Monasteries and to send in every direction a clear message that no one will be allowed ‘to instrumentalize’ Mount Athos. Because Mount Athos concerns everyone".

On 28 February, the community of Mount Athos discussed the Ukrainian question. The monasteries of the Great Lavra, Iveron, Koutloumousiou, and Esphigmenou published a joint communiqué. In said communiqué, among other things, the monsteries "denounced the Russian interference and the violation of the self-governance status of the St Panteleimon Monastery". The communiqué was published in exclusivity by the ROMFEA news agency.

== See also ==
- Granting of autocephaly to the Orthodox Church of Ukraine
- Eastern Orthodox Church organization
