= Law of Ukraine "On the Protection of the Constitutional Order in the Field of Activities of Religious Organizations" =

Religious law passed in 2024

On the protection of the constitutional order in the field of activities of religious organizations
- Coat of arms of Ukraine

Verkhovna Rada
- Territorial extent: Ukraine
- Passed by: Presidential decree
- Passed: August 20, 2024
- Enacted: August 24, 2024
- Effective: September 23, 2024

Legislative history
- Introduced by: Denys Shmyhal
- Introduced: January 19, 2023
- Voting summary: 265 voted for; 29 voted against; 4 abstained

Related legislation
- The Law of Ukraine "On Amendments to Article 12 of the Law of Ukraine 'On Freedom of Conscience and Religious Organizations' regarding the name of religious organizations (associations) that are part of the structure (are part of) a religious organization (association), management center (management) which is located outside of Ukraine in a state recognized by law as having carried out military aggression against Ukraine and/or temporarily occupied part of the territory of Ukraine"
- Status: Current legislation

A law of Ukraine titled On the Protection of the Constitutional Order in the Field of Activities of Religious Organizations (Ukrainian: Закон України «Про захист конституційного ладу у сфері діяльності релігійних організацій»", romanized: Zakon Ukrainy «Pro zakhyst konstytutsiinoho ladu u sferi diialnosti relihiinykh orhanizatsii», and informally known as the "Law on the Prohibition of the Russian Orthodox Church in Ukraine") was adopted by the Verkhovna Rada (national parliament) of Ukraine on August 20, 2024. The law was adopted by 265 votes of people's deputies, while 29 voted against it, 4 abstained, and 23 did not vote.

The law defines the criteria and consequences of banning the activity of foreign religious organizations and their branches, the specifics of the termination due to the motives of propaganda towards the ideology of "Pax Russica" and by direct instruction prohibits the activity of the Ukrainian Orthodox Church (Moscow Patriarchate) (UOC-MP) in Ukraine.

Even before the start of legal proceedings regarding the prohibition of religious organizations, the authorities will be able to take state or public property from the lease of such structures, including temples and architectural monuments, whose lease contracts are terminated automatically a few months after the law's approval. According to BBC sources, there are about three thousand communities of the Russian Orthodox Church that use ancient churches.

The Law of Ukraine "On the Protection of the Constitutional Order in the Field of Activities of Religious Organizations" entered into force on September 23, 2024. Although not expressly prohibiting Eastern Orthodoxy, this bill serves as a functional ban on the practice of Orthodoxy. This is due to nearly all Orthodox parishes in Ukraine operating under the targeted patriarchs.

== Subject ==
The Law of Ukraine "On the Protection of the Constitutional Order in the Field of Activities of Religious Organizations" makes it impossible for religious organizations to operate under the control of a state that carries out aggression against Ukraine. A foreign religious organization is defined as a religious organization (including religious administrations, associations, or centers) that is a legal entity formed and/or registered in accordance with the legislation of another state and is located outside of Ukraine. Foreign religious organizations can carry out activities in Ukraine, provided that their activities do not harm Ukrainian national or public security and its protection of public order, health, morals, rights, and the freedoms of other persons.

The second part of the second article of the Law defines the criteria for banning the activity of foreign religious organizations, in particular:

1. Organisations in a state that is recognized as having carried out or is carrying out armed aggression against Ukraine and/or temporarily occupied part of the territory of Ukraine.
2. Organizations that directly or indirectly (including through public speeches of managers or other management bodies) support armed aggression against Ukraine. Foreign religious organizations located in a state recognized as having carried out or carrying out armed aggression against Ukraine and/or temporarily occupying part of the territory of Ukraine include foreign religious organizations (including religious administrations, associations, centers), whose head or center of management is located outside Ukraine in the relevant aggressor state.
3. Foreign religious organizations, the activities of which are prohibited in accordance with this Article, are defined by Article 3 of this Law.

The first part of the third article of the Law directly prohibits the activity of the Russian Orthodox Church in Ukraine because, as the Law states, it is an ideological extension of the regime of the aggressor state, an accomplice in war crimes and crimes against humanity committed in the name of the Russian Federation and its ideology of "Pax Russica".

The activity of religious organizations affiliated with a foreign religious organization, the activity of which is prohibited in Ukraine, including directly or as a component of another religious organization, or in the presence of other features established by Article 51 of the Law of Ukraine "On Freedom of Conscience and Religious Organizations", is not allowed and such religious organizations are terminated in accordance with the procedure established by law.

The list of religious organizations in Ukraine affiliated with a foreign religious organization, the activities of which are prohibited in Ukraine, is approved by order of the central body of executive power (referred to as the Central Executive Authority), which implements state policy in the field of religion, and is published on its official website. In the case established by law, the activity in Ukraine of a foreign religious organization located in a state that is recognized as having carried out or is carrying out armed aggression against Ukraine and/or has temporarily occupied a part of the territory of Ukraine, the activity of which is prohibited in Ukraine, shall be terminated from the date this Law or any laws that make relevant amendments to this Law date enters into force.

According to the fifth article of the Law, it is forbidden to use religious organizations to promote the ideology of "Pax Russica", including the popularization of such ideology. When applying this provision, the facts of the propagation of the ideology of "Pax Russica" are taken into account both directly by the religious organization and by its statutory or other management bodies, by other persons acting on their behalf by assignment or with permission or in accordance with another method of agreement, regardless of the form of such coordination. Consideration of the issue of confirming the facts of the use of a religious organization to propagate the ideology of the "Pax Russica" is carried out by the Central Committee of the Russian Federation, which implements state policy in the field of religion. During the examination, the conclusions of the religious expert examination, information of other Central Committees, data from public electronic registers, as well as information received from individuals and/or legal entities, from the media and other open sources may be used.

=== Prohibition procedure ===
The procedure for terminating and banning religious organizations affiliated with a foreign religious organization is prescribed, mainly, in the second part of the law as final provisions, which occupy the majority of the Law.

Religious organizations suspected of cooperation with the Russian Orthodox Church will be checked by the relevant expert commission. It should be created by the State Service of Ukraine for Ethnopolitics and Freedom of Conscience (DESS). If the commission records a violation, the DESS will issue an order to the church to correct the situation. Ukrainian religious organizations that are affiliated with religious organizations of the aggressor state will have 9 months to sever ties with their governing center.

If the relations with the aggressor state are not terminated, the DESS will file a lawsuit against this particular legal entity in court, which will have the right to decide on the ban.

== History ==
A total of 11 draft laws on banning or restricting the activities of foreign religious organizations and their branches have been registered in the Verkhovna Rada (the national parliament of Ukraine). On December 20, 2018, the Verkhovna Rada adopted the law "On Amendments to the Law of Ukraine "On Freedom of Conscience and Religious Organizations", according to which it obliged to change the name of the Ukrainian Orthodox Church (Moscow Patriarchate) to the Russian Orthodox Church due to its administrative center being located in the state that carried out military aggression against Ukraine.

After the beginning of the full-scale Russian invasion of Ukraine, a number of local councils began to make decisions to suspend or ban the activities of the UOC-MP in their communities, although such decisions did not have legal force. A number of regional, district, city, village and village councils appealed to the Verkhovna Rada, the Prime Minister, and the President of Ukraine to legislate a ban on the activities of the UOC-MP in Ukraine.

In May 2022, the Council of the Russian Orthodox Church of Ukraine was held, where changes were made to the charter, references to the Russian Orthodox Church were removed, except for the mention of the Charter of Patriarch Alexy II. Metropolitan Epiphanius of Kyiv noted that the meeting of this council did not change anything, and that the organization still preserved its unity with the Russian Orthodox Church.

On March 29, 2023, Ukraine terminated the contract with the Russian Orthodox Church on the lease of the Kyiv Pechersk Lavra. At the beginning of 2023, the return of the Pochaiv Assumption Lavra to the state began due to the fact that its lease agreement with the Russian Orthodox Church had expired. In June 2023, it became known that the Donetsk regional military administration planned to revise the lease agreement with the Russian Orthodox Church regarding the indefinite use of the Sviatohirsk Lavra.

On December 1, 2022, the president of Ukraine, Volodymyr Zelenskyy, implemented the decision of the National Security Council of Ukraine to ban religious organizations affiliated with centers of influence in the Russian Federation from operating in Ukraine. The Cabinet of Ministers of Ukraine submitted the relevant draft law to the Verkhovna Rada on January 19, 2023, and it was expected that the deputies would consider it in May 2023. However, on September 23, 2023, the Chairman of the Verkhovna Rada, Ruslan Stefanchuk, stated that there were no votes for the banning of the Russian Orthodox Church, as an internal discussion occurred.

On December 27, 2022, the Constitutional Court recognized as constitutional the law "On Freedom of Conscience and Religious Organizations", which renamed of the UOC-MP.

On October 5, 2023, the Verkhovna Rada collected 226 signatures on an appeal to Speaker Ruslan Stefanchuk, to introduce a ban on religious organizations affiliated with a foreign religious organization of the aggressor state.

On October 19, 2023, the Verkhovna Rada adopted the draft law in its first reading.

On November 2, 2023, the Sixth Administrative Court of Appeal upheld the decision of the court of first instance, which confirmed the legality of the request to rename the UOC in accordance with the Law adopted in 2018.

In March 2024, the Verkhovna Rada received a threatening letter from Robert Amsterdam, the head of the legal company "Amsterdam & Partners LLP", which is financed by the sanctioned former deputy Vadym Novynskyi, regarding the draft law banning the Russian Orthodox Church in Ukraine.

On April 17, 2024, the Parliamentary Assembly of the Council of Europe recognized the Russian Orthodox Church as an instrument of the Kremlin's "Pax Russica" propaganda.

On May 28, 2024, representatives of Ukrainian public organizations and movements issued a joint appeal to the leadership of the parliament and the ruling majority to immediately adopt a law banning the Russian Orthodox Church and a resolution on the decolonization of the names of settlements in Ukraine.

On July 21, 2024, it became known that 70 deputies of the Verkhovna Rada issued an ultimatum to the leadership of the parliament and the presidential faction regarding the final ban of the UOC-MP.

On August 17, the All-Ukrainian Council of Churches and Religious Organizations (VRCiRO) supported a legislative initiative to ban the activities of religious organizations associated with the Russian Federation.

On August 20, 2024, the Verkhovna Rada voted in the second reading and as a whole in favor of draft law No. 8371, which provided for a ban on the activities of religious organizations whose management center is located in the aggressor country. On August 24, 2024, Independence Day of Ukraine, President Volodymyr Zelenskyy signed the law. The same day law was also published in Holos Ukrainy, the law came into force on the 31st day following its publication.

== Reactions ==
=== Governments ===
- United States: On April 9, 2024, an official letter was sent to Ukraine from the US Commission on International Religious Freedom expressing concern about the situation caused by the consideration of draft law No. 8371 in the Verkhovna Rada. At the end of April 2024, Ukraine sent a response emphasizing the role that national security played in monitoring religious activities. On 7 October 2024, U.S. Ambassador Michael G. Kozak, Head of the United States Delegation at the Warsaw Human Dimension Conference (WHDC), stated that the U.S. is "concerned by the law’s potential to collectively punish entire religious communities".
- Holy See: Pope Francis stated that "no Christian church may be abolished directly or indirectly. The churches must not be touched".
- Russia: On 27 August 2024, Kremlin spokesman Dmitry Peskov, described the law as an attack on Christianity and the freedom of religion saying: "The Kyiv regime, unfortunately, continues to show its true nature. This is an open attack on freedom of religion, an attack on the Orthodox Church as a whole, and an attack on Christianity."
- Moldova: Spokesman of the governing party Adrian Vlas stated there are no plans for a law similar to Ukraine's. On 30 August 2024, President Maia Sandu also denied such plans and stated that she has good relationships to both Metropolitans of the Russian and Romanian churches.

=== International organizations ===
- (United Nations) UN Human Rights Office: On September 9, 2024, the UN Human Rights Office said that the law had "raised serious concerns regarding the freedom of religion".
- Human Rights Watch: On October 30, 2024, Human Rights Watch Europe and Central Asia director Hugh Williamson said about the law: "Ukrainian authorities understandably want to address state security concerns in the context of Russia’s brutal invasion of Ukraine. But the law interferes with the right to freedom of religion and is so broad that it could violate the rights of Ukrainian Orthodox Church members."

=== Religious organizations ===
- Ecumenical Patriarchate of Constantinople: Ecumenical Patriarch Bartholomew I declared his support for measures aimed at the good of Ukraine, in particular the initiative announced by President Volodymyr Zelenskyy regarding the spiritual independence of the state.
- Russian Orthodox Church: The Holy Synod of the Moscow Patriarchate condemned the law, considering it incompatible with the concept of the rule of law and the culmination of the destruction of the majority religious community. It blamed the Ecumenical Patriarch Bartholomew, describing his role as negative and his decisions as unilateral, hasty and contrary to the spirit of the sacred rules, which only aggravated the ecclesiastical division in Ukraine without healing it.
- Orthodox Church of Ukraine: On March 8, 2024, the Holy Synod of the Orthodox Church of Ukraine called on the Verkhovna Rada to adopt a draft law as soon as possible, which prohibits the subordination of any Ukrainian religious organizations to Russian religious and state centers. On August 21, 2024, Metropolitan Epiphanius of Kyiv declared that he was ready for a dialogue with Metropolitan Onufrii, and called on the faithful to reject the "Russian yoke".
- Ukrainian Orthodox Church of the Moscow Patriarchate (UOC-MP): In October 2023, the UOC-MP opposed the draft law, arguing that the draft law does not comply with the European Convention on Human Rights and the Constitution of Ukraine. The Russian Orthodox Church notes that the draft law "is essentially aimed at banning the Ukrainian Orthodox Church". After the final adoption of the draft law on August 20, 2024, Metropolitan Kliment declared that "the Ukrainian Orthodox Church will continue to live as a true church. Maybe the Ukrainian Orthodox Church forbids the Moscow Patriarchate, but the Ukrainian Orthodox Church does not have a Moscow Patriarchate".
- Albanian Orthodox Church: The church issued a statement in which the church denounced the law as "absurd" and offered prayers for the repeal of the law.
- Bulgarian Orthodox Church: Patriarch Daniyil said in a conversation with the US ambassador to Bulgaria that the Ukrainian Orthodox Church is experiencing "various restrictions" due to allegedly discriminatory policies, stressing the imposition of restrictions on religious freedom, freedom of worship, the forcible confiscation of church property and the promotion of hate speech.
- Serbian Orthodox Church: Patriarch Porfirije said that he received the news about the law with "deep indignation". He questioned President Zelensky’s aim with this legislation: "Our sister Church in Ukraine is persecuted by the declaratively democratic authorities consisting of her fellow countrymen, which makes the situation complicated and incomparably absurd."
- Czech and Slovak Orthodox Church: In April 2024, Metropolitan Rastislav Gont of the OCCLS condemned the "unjust and inexcusable persecution of the Ukrainian Orthodox Church [UOC-MP] by the Ukrainian state power [...] seeking to replace the canonical Church with schismatic structures [OCU]".
- Macedonian Orthodox Church (MOC-OA): In September 2024, condemned the ban, calling it a "depriv[ation] of the fundamental right of religious affiliation, belief and performing religious services".
- All-Ukrainian Council of Churches and Religious Organizations: On 16 August 2024, stated that it supports any legislative initiative that would ban the activities of organizations hostile to Ukraine.
- Ukrainian Greek Catholic Church: In January 2023, Supreme Archbishop Sviatoslav expressed doubts about the expediency of banning the Russian Orthodox Church. In his opinion, such an action could help the Russian Orthodox Church.
- Armenian Apostolic Church: Catholicos of All Armenians Karekin II warned of the negative impact the legislation would have on the spiritual and canonical life of the Orthodox population.

== Public opinion ==
According to polls, in January 2023, 69% of Ukrainians considered themselves Orthodox, with 41% belonging to the Orthodox Church of Ukraine, 4% to the Ukrainian Orthodox Church of the Moscow Patriarchate, and 24% not specifying either jurisdiction.

According to sociological polls in May 2024, 82% of Ukrainians did not trust the UOC-MP, and 63% wanted its complete ban.

== See also ==
- Annexation of the Metropolis of Kyiv by the Moscow Patriarchate
