= Dorotheos Dbar =

Archimandrite of Holy Metropolis of Goumenissa (Orthodox church)

The Very Reverend Father Dorotheos Dbar
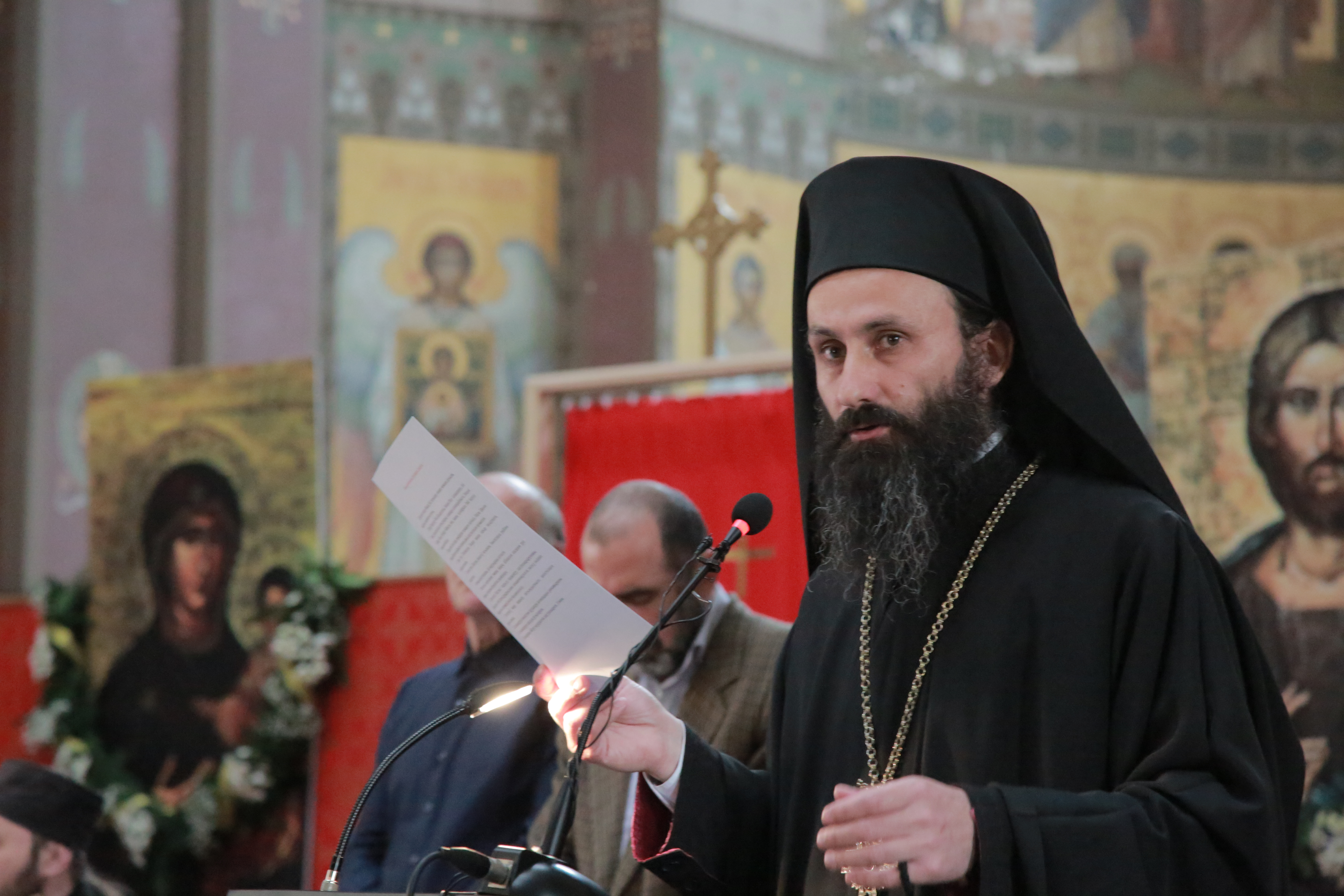
- Born: January 18, 1972; Mgudzirkhua, Gudauta District, AASSR, Georgian SSR, Soviet Union (now Abkhazia, Georgia )
- Citizenship: Abkhazia
- Education: Aristotle University of Thessaloniki
- Religion: Eastern Orthodoxy
- Church: Abkhazian Church

Archimandrite Dorotheos (Greek: Αρχιμανδρίτης Δωρόθεος Ντμπάρ, Abkhaz: архимандрит Дараҭ Дбар, born Dzhuma Dbar, January 18, 1972) is the archimandrite of Holy Metropolis of Goumenissa, Aksiupol and Policastro under the Ecumenical Patriarchate of Constantinople and a chairman of the Holy Metropolis of Abkhazia (HMA).

He is an author of two scientific monographs, several books, more than 150 publicistic articles and the chief editor of the religious and educational magazine “Alasharbaga” and the head of the cultural and educational center “Aduney”. Archimandrite Dorotheos also translated Liturgical texts from Ancient Greek, Modern Greek, the Church Slavonic language into Abkhazian and Russian.

== Early life ==
Dear was born Dzhuma Dbar in 1972 in the village of Mgudzirkhua, Gudauta District, Abkhazia, Georgia.

== Education ==
In 1991 Dbar entered the Abkhazian State University at the faculty of art as a painter-decorator.

In 1993 he entered the Moscow Theological Academy and Seminary and in 2001 graduated from the academy after defending his PhD Thesis, "History of Christianity in Abkhazia in the first millennium".

He was admitted to the doctoral program of Aristotle University of Thessaloniki on October 29, 2009. On May 4, 2014, Dbar successfully defended his doctoral thesis, "The Place of death and burial of St. John Chrysostom" («Ο τόπος θανάτου και ενταφιασμού του αγίου Ιωάννου του Χρυσοστόμου»).

== Priesthood ==
In August 2001, the head of Sukhum-Abkhazian Eparchy priest Vissarion Aplia sent a written recommendation to the bishop of Maikop and Adigeya to ordain Dorotheos Dbar to a priesthood. On August 26, 2001, he was ordained a monk, named Dorotheos by Bishop of Maikop and Adygea Panteleimon Kutovoy in the St. Michael Monastery (The Republic of Adygea, Russia). On August 29, 2001, Dbar was ordained a hierodeacon at the Trinity Cathedral in Maikop by the same bishop, and on September 9, 2001, he was ordained to the rank of presbyter (hieromonk). On March 10, 2002, Dbar received the right to move to another Diocese.

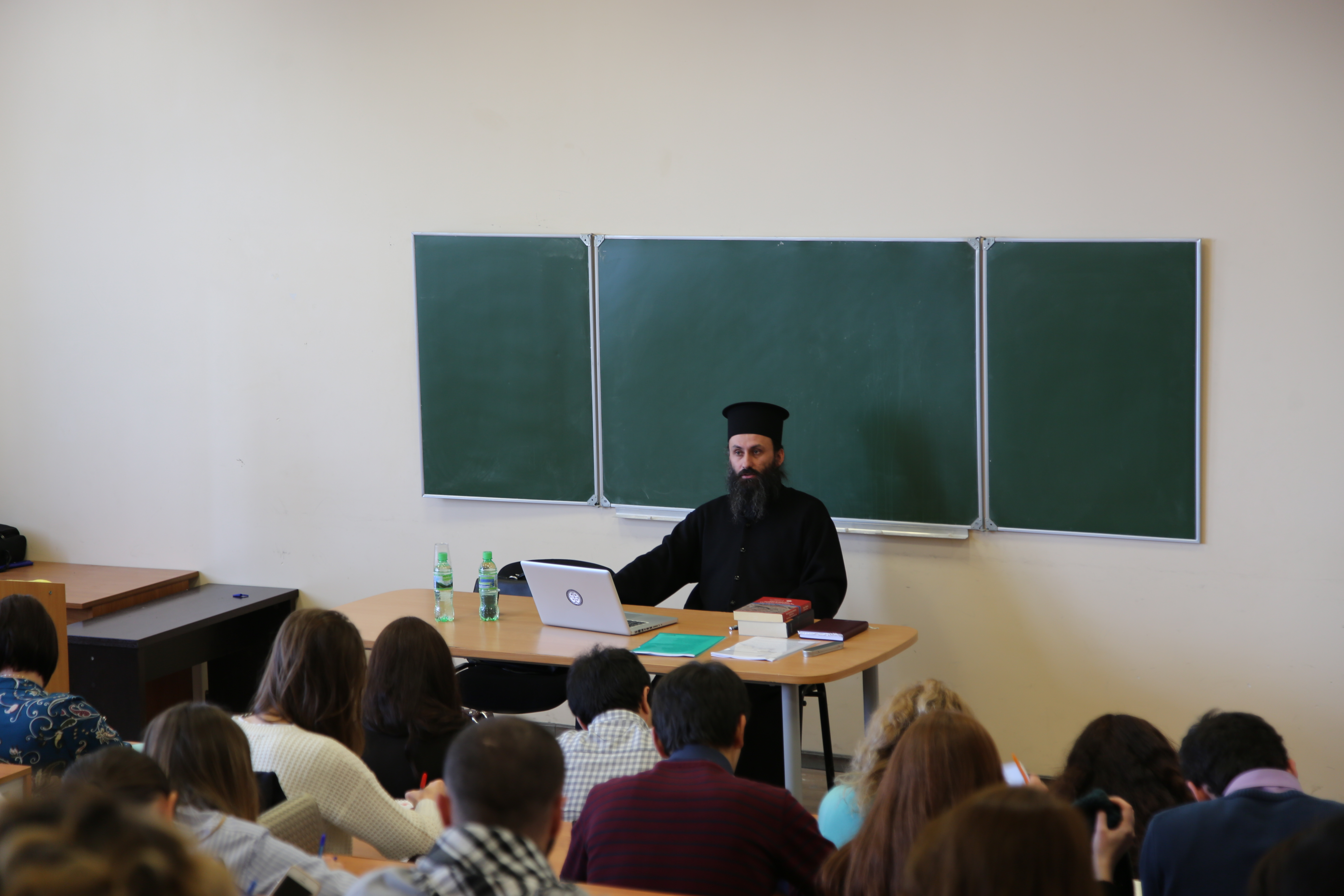

In 2002 Dbar founded the New Athos Seminary at the New Athos Monastery, and served as rector of the seminary from 2002 to 2006. While there, he also taught dogmatic theology, patrology, apologetics, pastoral theology, homiletics, canon law, history of the Abkhazian Church, sect studies and history of religions.

Since 2007 Dbar served as a monk in the monastery of Sts. Raphael, Nicholas and Irene in Paeonia, Greece. Since 2007 Dorotheos Dbar has also served in the Holy Metropolis of Goumenissa, Aksiupol and Policastro. Then he served in the temple of St. Demetrius of Thessaloniki in Aksiupol (Greece).

On April 21, 2011, Dorotheos Dbar was ordained to the rank of Archimandrite by Metropolitan of Goumenissa, Aksiupol and Policastro Demetrius Bekiaris in the monastery of Our Holy Mary (Goumenissa, Greece). On May 15 that same year, Dbar was elected as chairman of the Holy Metropolis of Abkhazia at the Church National Assembly. Raul Khajimba, then-leader of the opposition, supported Archimandrite Dorotheus.

On May 26, 2011, because of the convening of the Church National Assembly and the creation of the Holy Metropolis of Abkhazia, Dbar was banned to serve for one year by the Bishop of Maikop and Adygea Tikhon. On June 8, 2012, the ban was extended for three years. Prohibitions were not recognized by bishops of other Orthodox Churches, and Archimandrite Dorotheos went on serving in Abkhazia and Greece.

Dorotheos Dbar returned to Abkhazia in May 2014, and since 2015 he has delivered lectures at the seminary of the New Athos monastery.
