= Onufriy Berezovsky =

Ukrainian bishop

His Beatitude Metropolitan Onufriy
- Metropolitan of Kyiv and All Ukraine
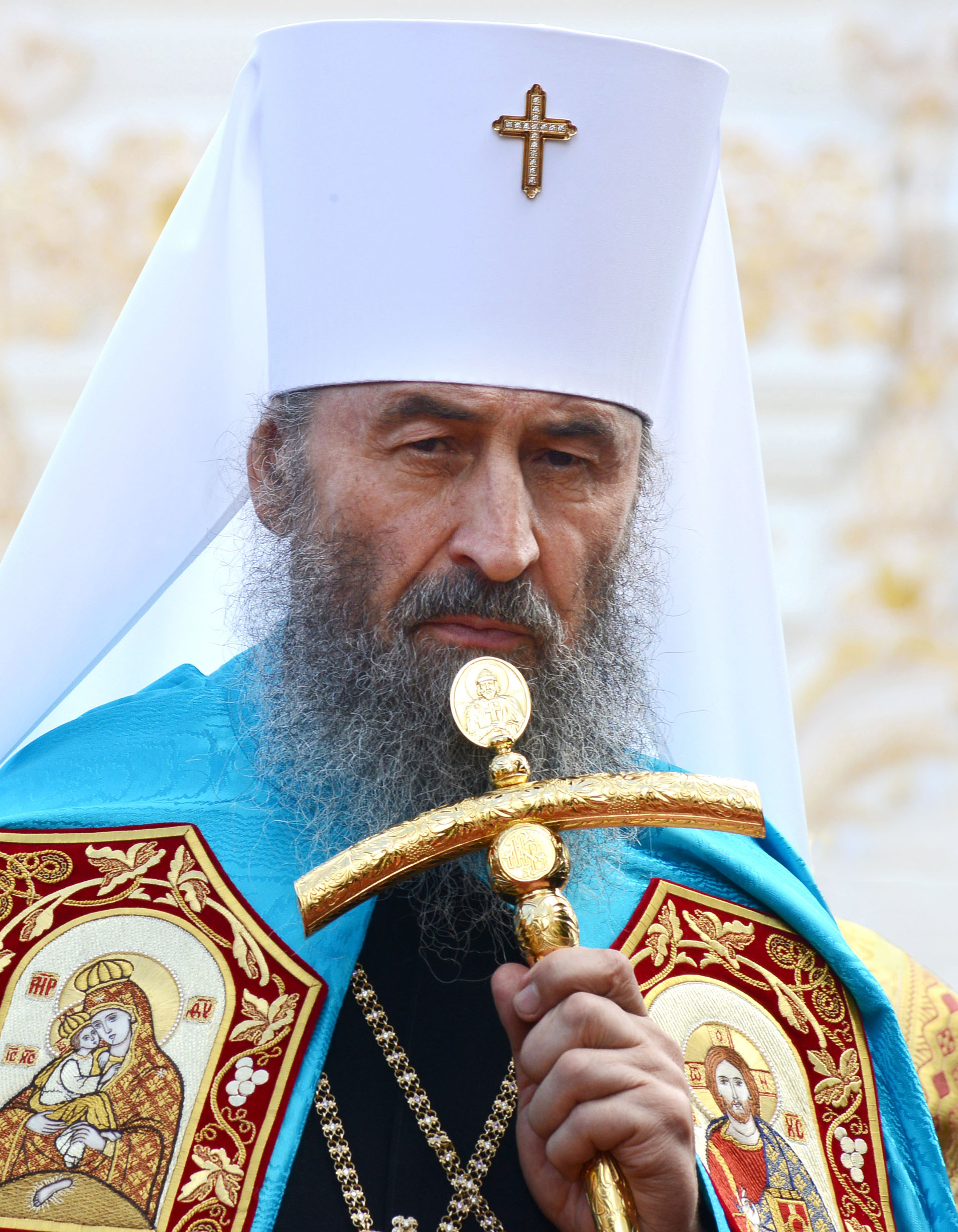
- Onufriy in 2019
- Native name: Орест Володимирович Березовський
- Church: Ukrainian Orthodox Church
- See: Kyiv
- Elected: 13 August 2014
- In office: 17 August 2014
- Predecessor: Volodymyr Sabodan

Personal details
- Born: Orest Volodymyrovych Berezovsky; 5 November 1944 (age 82) Korytne, Vyzhnytsia Raion, Chernivtsi Oblast, Ukrainian SSR, Soviet Union
- Education: Moscow Theological Academy (Doctor of Theology)
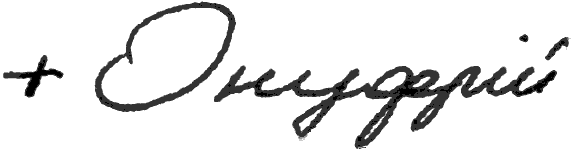
- Signature: Metropolitan Onufriy's signature

Metropolitan Onufriy (Onuphrius, secular name Orest Volodymyrovych Berezovsky; (Note: In this name that follows East Slavic naming customs, the patronymic is Volodymyrovych and the family name is Berezovsky.) Ukrainian: Орест Володимирович Березовський; Russian: Орест Владимирович Березовский; born 5 November 1944) is the primate of the Ukrainian Orthodox Church (UOC). While he is styled within his jurisdiction as "Metropolitan of Kyiv and All Ukraine", his canonical claim to this title has been disputed since 2019 by the Ecumenical Patriarchate of Constantinople, which, following the granting of the Tomos of Autocephaly to the Orthodox Church of Ukraine (OCU), recognizes Metropolitan Epiphanius, as the sole canonical primate of Kyiv and All Ukraine.

== Biography ==
Berezovsky was born 5 November 1944 in Chernivtsi Oblast as the son of a priest. In 1961 he graduated from high school. From 1962 to 1964 he studied at the Chernivtsi technical school, after which he worked in construction organizations in Chernivtsi. In addition to his native Ukrainian, he also speaks Russian and Romanian.

In 1966, he joined the technical faculty of the Chernivtsi University, in late 1969, during his third year of study, he abandoned this path and entered the Moscow Theological Seminary in the second and last class of that year; the following year, he became part of the brotherhood of the Trinity Lavra of St. Sergius.

On 18 March 1971 he was tonsured a monk with the name Onufriy, in honor of St. Onuphrius the Great. On 20 June 1971 he was ordained a hierodeacon and on 29 May 1972 ordained a hieromonk. After 18 years, Archimandrite Onufriy went back to Ukraine as the superior of the Pochayiv Lavra of the Holy Assumption.

In 1988, he graduated from the Moscow Theological Academy as a candidate in theology.

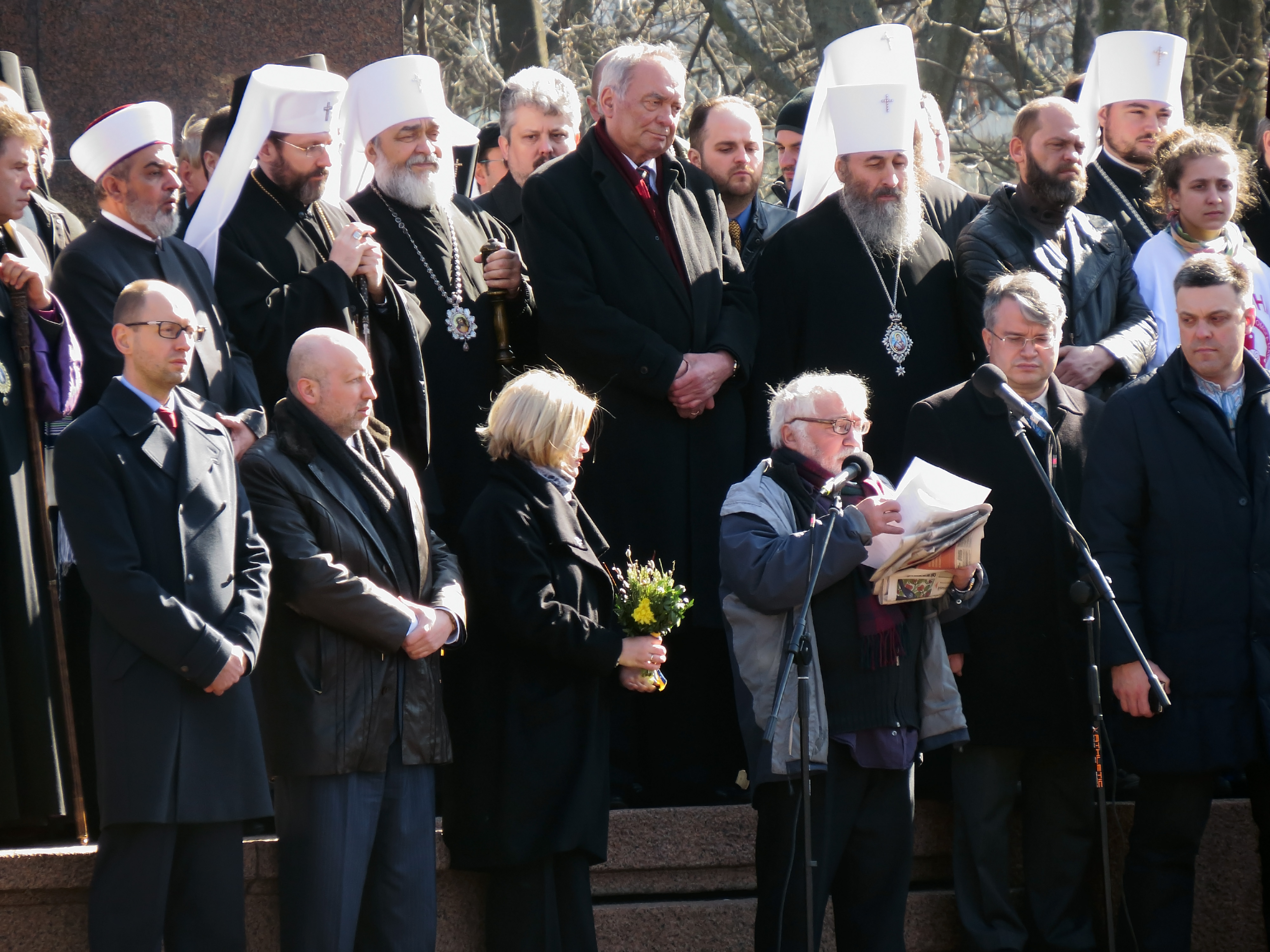
Meeting on celebrations for the 200th anniversary of the birth of Taras Shevchenko, Kyiv, Shevchenko park, 9 March 2014

On 20 July 1988 he was appointed Father-Superior of the Dormition Pochayiv Lavra.

On 9 December 1990 he was consecrated Bishop of Chernivtsi and Bukovina by Metropolitan Filaret (Denysenko) at the St Volodymyr's Cathedral in Kyiv.

On 22 January 1992, Onufriy signed a request of the bishops of the Ukrainian Orthodox Church to Patriarch of Moscow and All Russia Alexy II for the erection of an autocephalous Church in Ukraine, and on January 23 Onufriy was transferred by Metropolitan Philaret (Denysenko) to the Ivano-Frankivsk diocese.

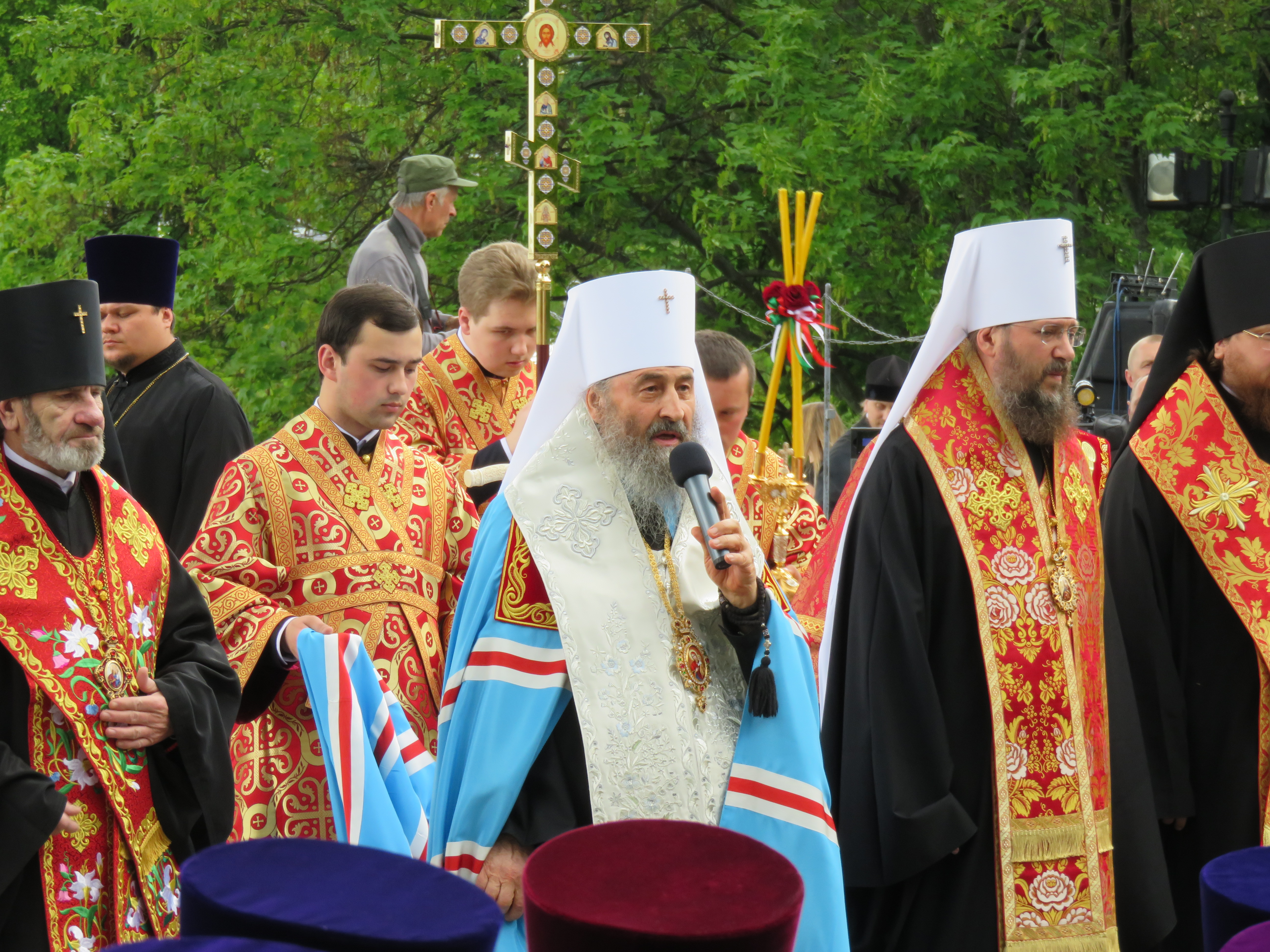
Onufriy in Kyiv, 8 May 2016

On 7 April 1992 he was restored by the Diocese of Chernivtsi, and served in this diocese for 23 years.

On 28 July 1994 Onufriy was elevated to the rank of archbishop and appointed a permanent member of the Holy Synod of the Ukrainian Orthodox church.

On 22 November 2000 Onufriy was elevated to the rank of Metropolitan.

At the 2009 Local Council of the Russian Orthodox Church, where a new Patriarch of Moscow was elected, Metropolitan Onufriy received 10 votes.

On 23 November 2013 Onufriy was awarded by Metropolitan of Kyiv and All Ukraine Vladimir the right to wear the second Panagia.

On 24 February 2014 the Holy Synod of the Ukrainian Orthodox Church elected Onufriy by secret ballot as locum tenens of the Kyiv metropolitan see, following the issuing of a medical certificate concerning the incapacity of Volodymyr, the Metropolitan of Kyiv and All Ukraine, to perform the duties of the Primate of the Ukrainian Orthodox Church. Volodymyr died on 5 July 2014.

On 13 August 2014 Onufriy was elected the new primate of the Ukrainian Orthodox Church and Metropolitan of Kyiv and All Ukraine under the Moscow Patriarchate (succeeding Metropolitan Volodymyr).

In February 2022, during the Russian invasion of Ukraine, along with other local bishops (such as the rival Metropolitan Epiphanius of Kyiv), Onufriy offered the churches of his diocese as shelters from the bombings. Onufriy did not publicly condemn collaborating clergymen from his church, and they were not dismissed from the church. He did ban from the church clergymen that transferred themselves to the Orthodox Church of Ukraine.

According to an April 2023 investigation by Ukrainska Pravda Onufriy obtained a Russian passport in 1998 and 2002. Onufriy did not deny he used to have Russian citizenship, but claimed he had obtained this to make true his former dream of living out his last days in the Trinity Lavra of St. Sergius but that "the bad relations between Russia and Ukraine, the collapse of the CIS, and especially Russia's war against Ukraine" had destroyed this hope.

By a decree of President Volodymyr Zelenskyy dated 2 July 2025 Onufriy's Ukrainian citizenship was terminated. According to Security Service of Ukraine (SBU) he had voluntarily received Russian citizenship in 2002 and had not informed the Ukrainian authorities about this. The SBU also accused Onufriy of maintaining ties with the Russian Orthodox Church, "whose representatives openly support Russian aggression against Ukraine", and had deliberately opposed obtaining canonical independence from this church. The SBU also concluded that, "despite the full-scale invasion of Russia", Onufriy continued to support the policy of the Russian Orthodox Church and its leadership, in particular Patriarch Kirill of Moscow.

== Views ==
Metropolitan Onufriy has referred to Ukraine's aspirations to join the European Union as a "tragedy".

Onufriy has voiced his support for the territorial integrity of Ukraine. He refused to stand up when the Ukrainian parliament honoured the Ukrainian fighters of the War in Donbas (against pro-Russian separatists), but later explained that this was an anti-war gesture. In August 2014 Onufriy stated that there were no priests in the Ukrainian Church who supported separatism. His Church has mostly abstained from commenting on the 2014–15 Russian military intervention in Ukraine.

In February 2016 he said that "in a situation of continued military confrontation in eastern Ukraine, we emphasize that we unfailingly stand on the side of peace and support all peace initiatives of the Ukrainian authorities".

On the first day of the 2022 Russian invasion of Ukraine, Onufriy offered his blessing to the Armed Forces of Ukraine, giving "our special love and support to our soldiers who stand guard and protect and defend our land and our people. May God bless and cherish them!" Onufriy also publicly deplored the invasion and supported Ukraine's sovereignty and territorial integrity, appealing to Vladimir Putin to stop invading Ukraine immediately. Two days before the invasion, Onufriy had stated that "The Ukrainian Orthodox Church (UOC) has consistently supported and continues to support the territorial integrity of Ukraine and calls on its faithful to pray for peace in our Ukrainian state and around the world... I urge state leaders and all those on whom it depends, to avoid engaging in a new war. War is a grave sin before God!"

On the Day of Ukrainian Statehood, 28 July 2023, Metropolitan Onufriy gave a speech in which he spoke of "This public holiday, which was established two years ago, has acquired a special significance for our country today. Today, our people are fighting for the preservation of our state, for its independence and territorial integrity, which was violated as a result of the treacherous invasion of Russian troops.", Onufriy declared that "The protection of one's Motherland is the sacred duty of every citizen, and therefore every believer of the Ukrainian Orthodox Church." and spoke regarding those UOC parishes in occupied territory, saying "Some of our dioceses and believers found themselves in the occupied territory. We often have no contact with them, we can't really help them with anything except to pray for them. However, these are our dioceses, these are our people, we pray for them, we consider them our brothers and sisters, and we await their reunification with us in a united, independent Ukraine." And declared that he believed that with God's help, Ukraine would win the war "I believe that with God's help we will win this war and rebuild our Ukraine. I am convinced that in order to succeed in this matter, we must be strong and united, treat our neighbors with love and respect."
