= Conflict between Filaret and Epiphanius =

Ongoing leadership dispute in the Orthodox Church of Ukraine

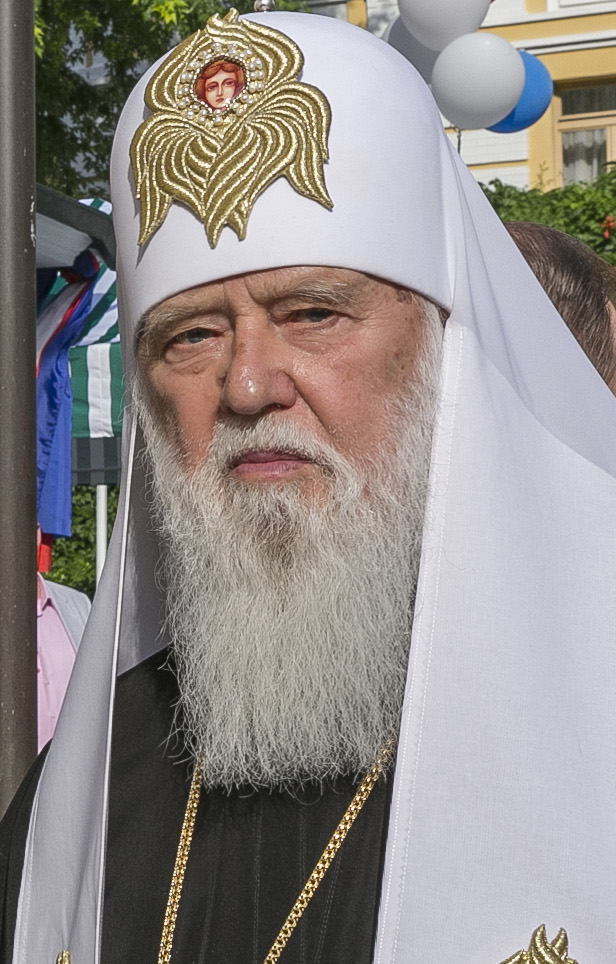
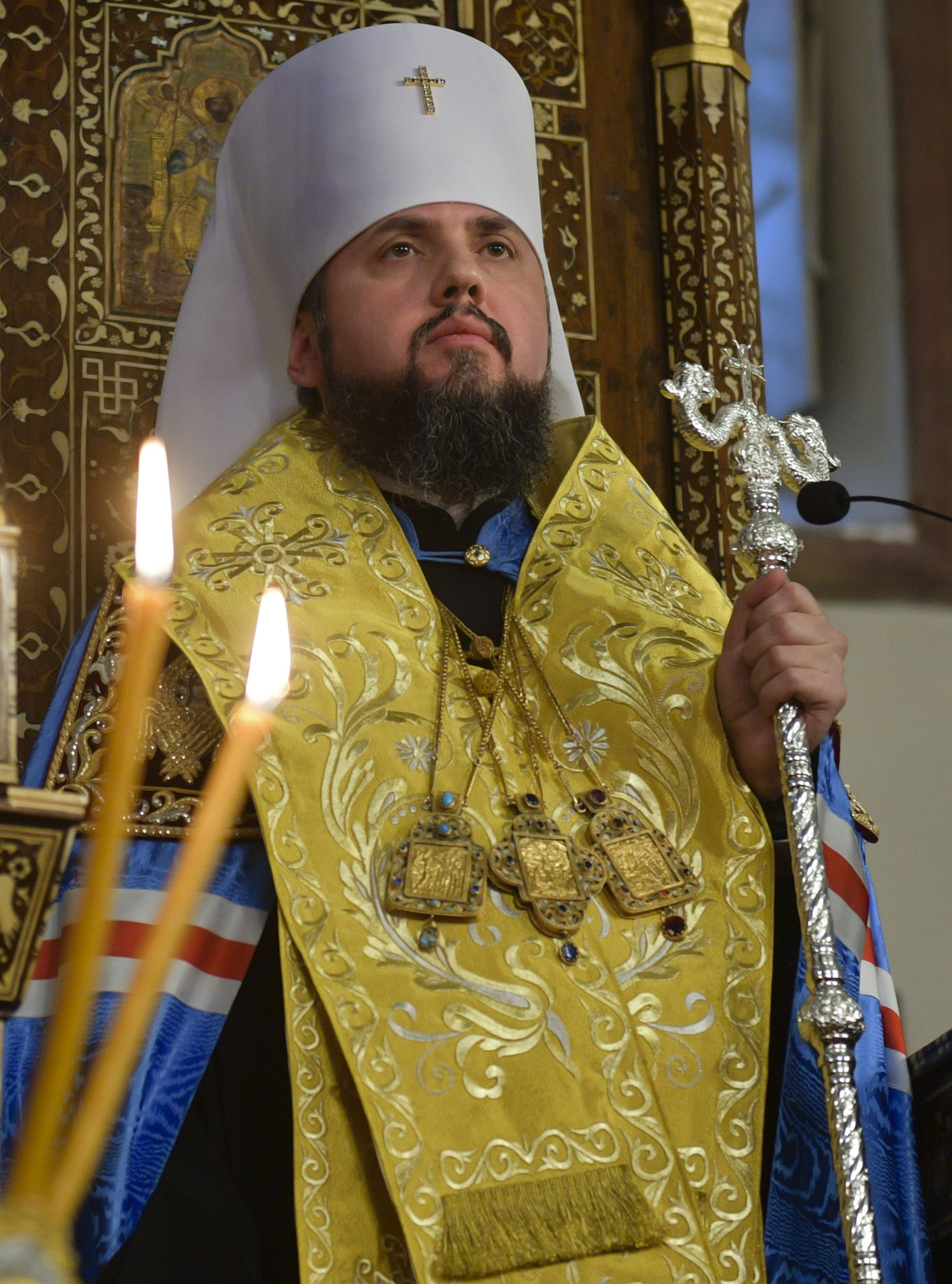
- Filaret Epiphanius
- Date: 6 January 2019–20 March 2026
- Also known as: Leadership conflict of the Orthodox Church of Ukraine (Ukrainian: Конфлікт у керівництві Православної церкви України)
- Type: Christian schism
- Participants: Ukrainian Orthodox Church – Kyiv Patriarchate (UOC-KP) (Filaret); Orthodox Church of Ukraine (OCU) (Epiphanius)
- Outcome: 1. Filaret, two bishops and some priests officially left the OCU on 20 June 2019; 2. Tensions still exist between the OCU and the UOC-KP

In 2018, Filaret (primate of the Ukrainian Orthodox Church – Kyiv Patriarchate) and Metropolitan Epiphanius (primate of the Orthodox Church of Ukraine) came into conflict over disagreements concerning the model of governance, the management of the diaspora, and the name and the charter of the newly-formed Orthodox Church of Ukraine (OCU). The conflict started during the process of the granting of autocephaly to the Orthodox Church of Ukraine and continued after the reception of the tomos (official decree) of autocephaly of the OCU in January 2019. It resulted in the departure of Filaret, along with two bishops and a dozen priests, from the OCU on 20 June 2019 after a Local Council convened by Filaret, returning to an independent Ukrainian Orthodox Church – Kyiv Patriarchate.

Filaret died on 20 March 2026, effectively ending the conflict in favour of Epiphanius. Filaret's attempts to re-establish a separate ecclesiastical jurisdiction failed to gain widespread support, and was mostly answered with rejection from Ukrainian society. Epiphanius expressed his "deep sorrow and grief in my heart" at hearing about Filaret's passing, praising the late patriarch's decades-long efforts at making the Ukrainian Church independent of Moscow.

== Filaret's demands ==
=== Diaspora, Holy synod, primate role ===
There were numerous things with which Filaret did not agree in the OCU. Filaret wanted:

1. To reorganize the Holy synod of the OCU by having 12 permanent appointed members of the holy synod instead of 3.
2. To lead the OCU together with the Metropolitan, Epiphanius, and claims it was agreed so before the unification council.
3. That the OCU be able to take care of the Ukrainian Orthodox diaspora.
4. That the OCU be able to make its own myrrh.
5. That the Ecumenical Patriarchate should not have a say in the internal conflict of the OCU.

=== OCU's name ===
Filaret told members of the media department of the dissolved Ukrainian Orthodox Church – Kyiv Patriarchate (UOC-KP) to convey the message that the OCU was not a new church and that the tomos of autocephaly was given to the UOC-KP. Filaret also instructed them to "eradicate" the name "Orthodox Church of Ukraine" because "'The Orthodox Church in Ukraine' means that this is not the ruling Church, but only one of the Churches in Ukraine ... And we are the ruling Church in Ukraine." This discussion between Filaret and the members was recorded and the pro-Moscow anonymous Union of Orthodox Journalists shared the recording on its website on 23 January 2019.

On 23 January 2019, Filaret declared in an interview given to the Federal News Agency that the OCU should be called "Ukrainian Orthodox Church". He says the origin of the name of the OCU is due to the fact that "there is an Orthodox church in Constantinople, and then they go [the exarchates dependent on Phanar (Note: Phanar designates the Patriarchate of Constantinople. The Phanar is where the administrative centre of the Patriarchate of Constantinople is; this metonymy is akin to Catholics saying Rome to designate the Papacy.)]: the Orthodox Church in America, Canada, Europe, Australia - and the Orthodox Church in Ukraine". Filaret declared the OCU "should be called as all churches are called, and not be led by the Greeks".

We want to be an autocephalous church — just like all other Orthodox churches, no more and no less. We do not want neither more nor less. And we are grateful to Constantinople for the fact that Patriarch Bartholomew gave us a tomos of autocephaly, he has undergone much for this. But, having received a tomos of autocephaly, we must be an autocephalous church. Professor Dmytro Stepovyk also supported Filaret, saying that "under no condition should we use the Orthodox Church in Ukraine or of Ukraine in press. Only the Ukrainian Orthodox Church, and only with the possessive case."

== Rising tensions ==
=== Deal at the unification council ===
On 15 December 2018, the hierarchs of the UAOC decided to dissolve the UAOC, and the hierarchs of the UOC-KP decided to dissolve the UOC-KP. This was done because on the same day the Ukrainian Autocephalous Orthodox Church, the Ukrainian Orthodox Church – Kyiv Patriarchate, and some members of the Ukrainian Orthodox Church (Moscow Patriarchate) were going to merge to form the Orthodox Church of Ukraine (OCU) after a unification council. The unification council elected Epiphanius as its primate.

On 22 December 2018, Filaret declared that if he had run for the role of primate of the OCU at the unification council, Ukraine would never have got a tomos. On 20 January 2019, Filaret declared, concerning Epiphanius: "I supported him and fought for his candidacy, because among all the young bishops I see him as the most worthy to be the primate of the Ukrainian Orthodox Church."

Filaret explained on 15 May 2019 in an appeal the conditions of the council. According to Filaret, the agreement reached at the unification council was as follows: "the primate is responsible for the external representation of the Ukrainian Orthodox Church (UOC), and the patriarch is responsible for the internal church life in Ukraine, but in cooperation with the primate. The primate shall do nothing in the church without the consent of the patriarch. The patriarch chairs the meetings of the Holy Synod and the UOC meetings for the sake of preserving unity, its growth, and affirmation." Filaret considers this agreement has not been fulfilled.

This deal was confirmed by Metropolitan Joasaph. However it is denied by Metropolitan Alexander (Drabinko).

Filaret also said he was asked by the Ecumenical Patriarch not to put forward his (Filaret) candidacy at the council, and that Metropolitan Emmanuel of France, who chaired the council, asked him not to wear the koukoulion; Filaret was also asked to nominate any bishop for the post of primate. Filaret agreed to the demands and said he chose "humiliation" in order for the church to get the tomos.

=== After the unification council ===
Filaret was given the title of the "honorary patriarch" of the Orthodox Church of Ukraine after the council. Volodymyr Burega, Professor and Vice-Rector of the Kyiv Theological Academy, explains this title in this way: "in December [2018], no one wanted to aggravate relationships with Patriarch Philaret, since holding the council and receiving the Tomos were at stake. That is why the council, which took place on December 15, did not clarify the new status of Patriarch Filaret. After the unification council of the OCU, they stated that Filaret was henceforth "honorary patriarch", but what this phrase meant was difficult to understand. Indeed, such status is not stipulated in the Charter of the OCU, adopted on December 15."

On 16 December 2018, during a divine liturgy in which he came wearing the headgear of a patriarch, during his homily, Filaret declared he was still patriarch: "The Patriarch remains for life and, together with the Primate, governs the Ukrainian Orthodox Church". After the mass, he was acclaimed by the hierarchs of the church as "great vladyka and father Filaret, the holiest patriarch of Kyiv and all Ukraine-Rus and sacred archimandrite of the Holy Dormition Kyiv-Pechersk Lavra".

=== After receiving the tomos ===
According to Epiphanius, a conflict had already started on 6 January after the tomos was received.

The first meeting of the Holy synod of the OCU was very tense. Moreover, Filaret demanded for the members of the synod not be appointed according to the statute and the tomos of autocephaly of the OCU, but for members of the former Holy synod of the UOC-KP be appointed instead. In the end, the members of the holy synod were appointed following the statute and tomos.

On 15 March 2019, Filaret declared that at the next local synod the OCU should change its charter, saying: "The most important thing is to change the number of permanent members of the Synod. We need not three of them but many more, like 12."

On 3 April, Metropolitan Joasaph of the OCU wrote a text in which he said there was an attempt by the young bishops of the OCU to overthrow Filaret.

== Beginning of risks of schism ==
=== Filaret's St Macarius celebration ===
On 8 May 2019, Filaret sent invitations to former UOC-KP bishops for a meeting to celebrate St Macarius on May 13–14, but did not send an invitation to Epiphanius.

On 9 May, Filaret declared the UOC-KP still existed: "the Kyiv Patriarchate has not been liquidated. It is not liquidated. They want to present the situation as if it was liquidated. The Kyiv Patriarchate can be liquidated by the one who created it".

On 10 May, Filaret sent an invitation to Epiphanius; Filaret said he did not send an invitation to Epiphanius because since Epiphanius' election (five months) Epiphanius has not celebrated divine liturgy alongside Filaret.

The Ecumenical Patriarchate told BBC Ukraine about the situation when asked to comment: "This is terrible!" Filaret also stated to 1+1: "There is a patriarch, since there is a patriarch, it means there is a patriarchate, there is the Kyiv Patriarchate, and therefore it is not necessary to return the patriarchate, it is and must be". Asked by TCH if he admits that such actions could lead to a split in the church, Filaret said: "I admit, but we will create a single church - the Kyiv Patriarchate, necessarily."

Epiphanius gave an interview "connected with the rumors that Patriarch Emeritus Filaret wants to convene a Local Council in the beginning of summer with a view to change the Charter of the OCU and reassume the patriarchal status". In this interview, Epiphanius said that changing the charter of the OCU could mean a loss of the tomos, he also wrote on his Facebook page: "the return to the previous structure of the Kyiv Patriarchate means returning to isolation, loss of tomos and all the achievements of church independence."

On 13 May, Filaret admitted a split is possible inside the OCU.

The Assembly of bishops to revise the tomos needs either to be convoked by the primate (Epiphanius), the Holy Synod of the OCU, or 1/3 of the total of the bishops of the OCU. Filaret maybe aimed for the third option. BBC Ukraine said that Filaret could possibly count on the support of Metropolitan Mykhayil (Zinkevich), who had been forced by Filaret to give up his candidacy at the unification council, and is very influential within the OCU.

The assembly of 14–15 May was seen as the first stage to revise the charter, as a "parade of forces" to see how many bishops would support revising the charter. However, only 4 bishops came, and Mykhayil did not come. Mykhayil was in Vinnitsia to help Metropolitan Simeon.

During Filaret's sermon on 14 May he said: "We will continue to fight for a single local Orthodox Church, independent of Moscow, or from Constantinople". Still on 14 May, a rally to support the unity of the OCU took place outside of Filaret's residence; the rally had been organized by the public organization Corps of Defenders of the Revolution of Dignity. On the same day, in an interview given to Interfax-Ukraine, Epiphanius said there was "no schism".

=== Filaret's appeal ===
On 14 May 2019, Filaret published an appeal. In his appeal he said the OCU faced "separation, diarchy, which can lead to sad consequences". He added:

In order to rectify the situation, and it can be rectified, it is necessary to fulfill the agreements that were reached before the council in the presence of President Poroshenko and with the bishops. This means the primate is responsible for the external representation of the Ukrainian Orthodox Church (UOC), and the patriarch is responsible for the internal church life in Ukraine, but in cooperation with the primate. The primate shall do nothing in the church without the consent of the patriarch. The patriarch chairs the meetings of the Holy Synod and the UOC meetings for the sake of preserving unity, its growth, and affirmation

— Filaret

He also said in his appeal that the Kyiv Patriarchate "was and will be", Filaret also said that giving up the status of patriarchate was a demand of the Ecumenical Patriarchate in order for the Ecumenical Patriarchate to grant a tomos to a Metropolis which was part of the Ecumenical Patriarchate. Filaret said that therefore "giving up on the status of patriarchy was purely situational". Moreover, Filaret also said that at the next meeting of the Holy Synod of the OCU, said synod would arrange Filaret's retirement, and that "Moscow is satisfied with the state of affairs in the UOC (OCU). What they could not achieve through various efforts, they are now achieving through the actions of the OCU head."

On the same day he made a press conference, in which he said:

The president [Poroshenko] promised one thing, but he did something different, as I wrote in my appeal. The problem arises in the fact that they did not comply with the agreements of December 15 [2018].

It was an agreement not only with Poroshenko, but also with Epifaniy and the bishops, that I would rule the Church inside Ukraine, while he would rule outside. He [Epiphanius] avoids communication with me. I gave him advice on what to do at the very beginning, but he did quite the opposite. He says publicly that he respects the Patriarch. But these are just words, because the actions are opposite.

Had I known what would have happened, I would not put forward his candidacy. I expected him to take a straight way, and not a curvy track.

— Filaret

On an interview published on 15 May, Metropolitan Mykhayil (Zinkevich) said there will be no split and that Filaret's holy synod reforms were not supported.

Ecumenical Patriarch Bartholomew told BBC Ukraine on 15 May that there was no patriarch of Kyiv because "there never was".

During the same press conference, he said: "I do not believe that Tomos will be withdrawn because the withdrawal of Tomos will strike at the Ecumenical Patriarchate itself." Concerning the holding of the Local Council of the OCU, which Filaret, accor wants to convene to change the Charter of the OCU and then proclaim the Patriarchate, Filaret said it depended on the Synod of the OCU: "When the Synod will be determined, then it will be." At the same time, Filaret did not specify how many OCU bishops supported such an idea: "I am not interested in how many bishops support me in this."

15 May, Metropolitan Alexander (Drabinko) wrote on his Facebook page: "In his appeal, Metropolitan Filaret refers to the arrangements that he claims to have guaranteed his participation in the administration of the Orthodox Church of Ukraine after receiving the Tomos of autocephaly, suggesting that Metropolitan Epiphanius would renounce most of his powers in favor of the "honorary patriarch." However, it was reported that no such decisions were known to exist during the unification council that took place on December 15, 2018. Neither Metropolitan Filaret, nor Metropolitan Epiphanius, nor President Petro Poroshenko did inform the Council about such agreements."

On 16 May, Advisor of the then-President Poroshenko gave an interview in which he said that if the conditions set out in the tomos were not violated, said tomos would not be taken away.

On 16 May, Epiphanius gave an interview to BBC Ukraine. In it, he said that the OCU will never go back to the old model of governance Filaret wants, and that there was no other mechanism to convey a council besides the primate or the holy synod. In the same interview, Epiphanius announced that the next Holy Synod meeting of the OCU would be on 24 May.

On 17 May, "[t]he press service of the Kyiv Metropolis of the Ukrainian Orthodox Church (OCU) gave an official clarification regarding the status of the Ukrainian Orthodox Church of the Kyiv Patriarchate. The document states that on December 15, 2018, the UOC-KP terminated its independent activity and all its fullness became part of the Orthodox Church of Ukraine, according to the decision of its own Local Council."

On 17 May, Archbishop Clement of the OCU came out in support for Filaret.

On 22 May, Filaret assured a delegation of the Ecumenical Patriarchate that he was supporting Epiphanius.

Makariy declared in an interview published on 23 May that neither the UAOC nor the UOC-KP had been dissolved: "Some government officials spoke incorrectly when they publicly declared that the Kyiv Patriarchate was liquidated." He explained that Philaret submitted only copies of documents, not the originals necessary in order to liquidate the UOC-KP. Macarius added: "When I was asked to hand over the documents for liquidation, I replied that until I see the originals from the other side, I will not turn in mine."

=== Holy Synod of the OCU ===
On 24 May, the meeting of the Holy Synod of the OCU was held. During the meeting, hundreds of people, mostly elderly, were near from where the meeting was taking place to show their support to Filaret by waving banners and shouting slogans.

According to Epiphanius, Filaret did not sign to follow the OCU charter of 15 December 2018, while all the other members of the holy synod did, and during the synod Filaret said the UOC-KP still existed. He also said that all members of the holy synod had tried to tell Filaret that "de jure and de facto there is no Ukrainian Orthodox Church of Kyiv Patriarchate".

After the meeting of the holy synod, Filaret declared: "The decisions of the Synod, if they do not contradict the canons and the interests of the Ukrainian church, will be fulfilled, and if they do harm to the Ukrainian church, I will not fulfill them," and "I will defend the Kyiv Patriarchate to the end!"

On 24 May, Filaret said they "didn't know what was written" on the tomos until the unification council was done; Filaret added: "We accept the tomos and thank for it. But we accept the part where we are recognized as an autocephalous church."

On 25 May, Filaret went to the St. Michael's Golden-Domed Monastery where he congratulated Epiphanius for his name day and said: "Our main task is to unite all Orthodoxy of Ukraine into a single Local Orthodox Church. If we achieve this, it will mean that Ukraine is invincible because it has a solid foundation". On the same day, Filaret stated in an interview that the 24 May holy synod was "aimed at the destruction of the Kyiv Patriarchate" and that "[n]ow there is an influence on our primate of these pro-Moscow forces that have entered. And their task is to destroy the Kyiv Patriarchate."

On 25 May, Metropolitan Emmanuel of France of the Ecumenical Patriarchate answered Filaret's allegations, stating that "All the accusations that [the OCU's] Primate is surrounded by some pro-Russian forces is a myth. Metropolitan Epifaniy is a young and powerful person that we support together with all Ukrainians."

=== Suspension of the rector of the Kyiv Theological Academy ===
On 28 May, Filaret issued a document with the forms and the seal of the Kyiv Patriarchate to suspend Oleksandr Trofimlyuk, priest and rector of the Kyiv Orthodox Theological Academy. At the time, Oleksandr was regarded as Epiphanius' right arm. In accordance with the decision of the OCU's 5 February 2019 holy synod, Filaret held diocesan jurisdiction over Kyiv at the time, excepting St. Michael's Golden-Domed Monastery

On 29 May, Epiphanius issued a document invalidating all documents to be issued "on behalf of the religious association of the UOC-KP, which ceased its activities" after 30 January 2019, and that Oleksandr Trofimlyuk's parish would be directly governed by Epiphanius until the next holy synod. On the same day, Filaret immediately responded with a letter to Epiphanius, saying the latter violated canon law by welcoming clergy from the diocese of Kyiv (which was subject to Filaret's jurisdiction) into his (Epiphanius') jurisdiction.

On 31 May, the Ecumenical Patriarch Bartholomew made an address to the National Union of Journalists of Ukraine, in which Bartholomew said: "As for Filaret, he was restored to his episcopal dignity as former Metropolitan of Kyiv. The so-called 'Patriarchate of Kyiv' does not exist and never existed".

On 1 June 2019, Bishop Adrian (Kulyk) of the Orthodox Church of Ukraine said on his Facebook page that, according to calls he received from priest-rectors of the churches of Kyiv, Filaret asked all his priests of Kyiv to come at his residence on Monday 3 June 2019 at 11 o' clock. The callers said Filaret would force them to sign an oath to the Kyiv Patriarchate and to Filaret as Patriarch. Bishop Adrian said he advised the priests to decide themselves whether they want to follow Filaret or not.

On 3 June 2019, an assembly of priests took place at Filaret's residence in Kyiv. Allegedly, they were asked not to talk about what happened during the meeting and did not sign any document; almost all priests of Kyiv came to the meeting. One priest who came to the meeting said they discussed convening a local council.

On 4 June, the OCU released on its YouTube channel a video of Filaret dissolving the KP.

On 5 June, some of Filaret's declarations at the 3 June meeting were revealed by TSN. Filaret said:

Now our task is to preserve the Kyiv Patriarchate. No matter in what amount. But it must exist.

I have only one request for you – do not re-register parish charters as the so-called OCU. Now they will put pressure on you to re-register as part of the OCU and if someone re-registers he leaves the Kyiv Patriarchate. That is, we do not proceed from the Tomos because it is a new Church. Aas [sic] they say about themselves "we are a new Church", while the Kyiv Patriarchate has existed for 30 years. So who's splitting from whom? It is the OCU that splits from the Kyiv Patriarchate.

We are trying to convene a Local Council, and this Council will decide on the existence of the Kyiv Patriarchate. The Kyiv Patriarchate will continue to exist legally, because the KP was created by the Local Council and only a Local Council, not the Council of Bishops, can liquidate it.

— Filaret

On 5 June, the press service of the Kyiv Patriarchate, "[i]n connection with the mass media dissemination of a great deal of distorted news", released a statement explaining why the Kyiv Patriarchate still exists, acknowledging the documents of the KP's dissolution.

In an interview extract of Epiphanius by Ukrinform published on 5 June, Epiphanius said concerning convening a local council: "A few months ago, we held a Unification Local Orthodox Council at which we almost unanimously adopted the Charter of this Church. There is no urgent need to convene [another Local Council] now."

== Kyiv Patriarchate Forum, announcement of the KP Local Council ==
On 7 June, the UOC-KP announced a forum of intellectuals would take place on 11 June, under the title "For the Ukrainian Orthodox Church! For the Kyiv Patriarchate!" According to the RISU, this forum is an act which "obvious[ly]" falls within the scenario of reinstating the Kyiv Patriarchate.

On 11 June, before the beginning of the forum, Filaret clarified that he will convene a council of the Kyiv Patriarchate on 20 June 2019: "We are convening the Local Council which will not uphold the decision of the Council held on December 15, 2018. It means it is not mandatory for us. This will show that the Kyiv Patriarchate has existed, still exists and will continue to exist. We have scheduled the Council for June 20."

Filaret said during the forum: "We do not accept this Tomos because we did not know the contents of the Tomos we were granted. Had we known its content, we would not have voted for autocephaly on December 15. For we don't have to rush from one dependence to another. The Moscow Patriarchate serves the interests of Moscow, the Orthodox Church of Ukraine serves the Greeks. And who will serve Ukraine?"

Filaret also said Epiphanius was "a servant of the Ecumenical Patriarch. He put the Greek as a vicar bishop (Note: See .) so that he could observe and hand over information to the Ecumenical Patriarch to give instructions through him of what to do."

In an interview given the same day to Glavcom, Filaret said the main reason why Epiphanius was trying to liquidate the UOC-KP was in order for Epiphanius to take the UOC-KP's money. Filaret explained that he had been told by Poroshenko that he (Filaret) would be leading the OCU "just as you did it before, while Epiphany [Epiphanius] would represent the Church on the outside". Filaret also stated that the OCU was not independent for three reasons: first and foremost because the OCU cannot make its own myrrh ("the Church that does not have such a right is not independent" he says), second because it cannot have dioceses outside of Ukraine, and thirdly because it agrees that the Ecumenical Patriarchate can solve problems which arise within the OCU. In another interview given the same day to the TV channel Present Time, Filaret reaffirmed that he disagreed with those three points (myrrh, diaspora and appeal to the Ecumenical Patriarchate).

According to the UOC-KP, two students of the Kyiv Orthodox Theological Academy who had gone to the 11 June Kyiv Patriarchate Forum have been expelled from said academy on 11 June "for participating in activities aimed at causing a split of a single local Orthodox Church of Ukraine".

=== Filaret concerning the tomos and the OCU ===
On 12 June, in an interview with Ukrainian Radio, Filaret said:

[The Tomos] misled us. It split the Kyiv Patriarchate into parts. This Tomos did not so much good as harm.
[...] At the Council on December 15, we were not shown the contents of the Tomos. If I had known the contents, which were found out only on January 6, 2019, we would have refused it. We were tricked. We were granted the Tomos of autocephaly, but we were enticed because in fact the Tomos enshrines dependence of the Ukrainian church on the Patriarchate of Constantinople.
[...] If this OCU separates from the Kyiv Patriarchate, then let it be separated. But the Kyiv Patriarchate was, is and will be. Our task is not to split. Our task is to unite all Orthodoxy into one independent church.
[...] Don’t call the OCU a canonical Church, do not claim a falsehood, it is not recognized as canonical by the other Churches; it is recognized by the Ecumenical Patriarch alone. It has a tomos in name, but it is not autocephalous in content, and 13 Local Churches do not recognize the OCU as a canonical Church. So how is it canonical, when no one serves with Metropolitan Epiphany [Epiphanius] except the Ecumenical Patriarch?
[...] [I]f the Ecumenical Patriarch removed the anathema from me in 2018, then until 2018 was I under anathema or not? If I was under anathema, that means that all these bishops are illegitimate, and Epiphany is not only not a metropolitan—he’s not even a priest. If the Ecumenical Patriarch removed the anathema from me in 2018, then the entire episcopate is invalid!

— Filaret

Filaret also said concerning the future of the UOC-KP: "At first it will be small, but this Kyiv Patriarchate is certain to grow again to become a large one. Because the Ukrainian people demand an independent church." He also declared that the OCU was "a purely formal association." Filaret also said the UOC-KP Local Council of 20 June would be legal and that the Kyiv Patriarchate continued to exist.

=== Warning from the OCU, invitations to the Local Council ===
On 14 June, Epiphanius officially warned Filaret that the latter possessed no right to convene a local council of the UOC-KP. Epiphanius wrote: "The voluntary and non-statutory conduct of an assembly of a group of unauthorized persons -- such assembly being referred to as the Council -- will constitute the church split and the secession of organizers and participants of such meetings from the Orthodox Church of Ukraine with all canonical and legal consequences". Epiphanius also wrote the Kyiv Patriarchate had ceased to exist on 15 December 2018.

On the same day, Epiphanius said in an interview that the Kyiv Patriarchate had been dissolved and that now Filaret "can only talk about the creation of a new structure with the old name".

On 14 June, Filaret sent invitations for the Local Council of the UOC-KP.

On 18 June, Epiphanius said the OCU would render its judgement concerning Filaret's council at the end of June and the Filaret's council would be "a meeting with no canonical status." On the same day, the OCU asked military chaplains not to take part in Filaret's council.

On 19 June, Metropolitan Alexander (Drabinko) of the OCU announced that on 20 June a forum on the importance of the unity of the Ukrainian Orthodox church would take place.

== Filaret's Local Council ==
=== Local Council ===
On 20 June 2019, the Local Council took place at the St. Volodymyr's Cathedral. Two bishops participated: Metropolitan Joasaph and his vicar, Bishop Peter (Moscalev) who head parishes of the UOC-KP in Russia and Moldova. A dozen priests also participated in the council.

On the same day Filaret consecrated as bishops two priests who had been expelled from the Ukrainian autocephalous church: the Archimandrite Andriy (Marutsak) and the Hieromonk Ilya (Zelensky). The service took place in Saint Sophia Cathedral in Kyiv. The co-consecrators were the Metropolitan of Belgorod, Joasaph (Shibaev), and the Bishop of Valujsk, Petr (Moskalev). The latter was expelled from the autocephalous Church. Since the Ukrainian autocephalous Church "is approved by the Patriarchate of Constantinople, but excommunicated by the Russian Orthodox Church", the consecration of two priests expelled by the autocephalous Church has been seen as a patriarchal schism.

The Local Council approved a resolution saying the council abrogated the decisions of the unification council. The resolution also stated that "[t]he UOC-KP continues to be the owner of all funds, all property (movable and immovable) purchased [with] its own money or transferred to it by state authorities or local government bodies". The resolution also said that the tomos of autocephaly of the OCU placed the OCU in dependence of the Ecumenical Patriarchate. The resolution also stated that the council thanked Patriarch Bartholomew "for his attempts to resolve the Ukrainian church problem," but emphasized that they disagreed with the text of the Tomos. The Local Council also elected two new bishops. The document also reaffirmed that Filaret was the head of the UOC-KP, elected "for life [...] on October 20–22, 1995".

Filaret declared on the same day: "Ukraine will have the Church of the Moscow Patriarchate, the Orthodox Church in Ukraine that has a tomos - [...] a limited tomos subordinating it to the Ecumenical Patriarchate - and there will be a third independent church - the Ukrainian Orthodox Church of the Kyiv Patriarchate." He added that if the OCU wanted to unite with the UOC-KP, nobody would be against it.

On 21 June, Filaret asked Ukrainian Interior Minister Askan Avakov to protect the faithful and the property of the Kyiv Patriarchate from the "illegal actions of the Orthodox Church of Ukraine"; Filaret gave the examples of the St. Feodosiya's monastery and the Uspensky shrine which he claims have been captured by the OCU.

=== Reaction of the OCU ===
On 20 June 2019, the OCU declared in an official communiqué concerning Filaret's council: "The assembly that gathered today at Flilaret’s personal will has neither legal nor canonical effects for the Orthodox Church of Ukraine. This is not a split, a small part of the OCU branched out into a new structure and named it the UOC-Kyiv Patriarchate, but it is not the UOC-KP and cannot be it. This assembly cannot question the validity of the Tomos or the authority of the OCU. The only consequence of this action is that Filaret will no longer have any powers in the OCU."

On 24 June, the holy synod of the OCU met. Before the council began, when asked by the BBC if a radical decision concerning Filaret's excommunication would be made, Epiphanius said: "No. We will not be like the Moscow church and pass such decisions." The Holy synod decided that, taking into account the 20 June Local council convened by Filaret as well as "the special past merits before the Ukrainian Orthodox Church", Filaret would remain a bishop of the OCU. However, the holy synod decided that the diocese of Kyiv would be thenceforth headed by Epiphanius and not by Filaret. The Holy Synod decided to expel Metropolitan Joasaph and Peter (Moskalyov), who had attended the 20 June Local Council, from the OCU. The Synod also declared that the UOC-KP and the UAOC had completely united into the OCU.

On 25 June, Filaret declared: "We remain a church independent of Moscow or from Constantinople. We have our own charter and continue to exist in Ukraine as the independent Ukrainian Church of the Kyivan Patriarchate, and separated from the OCU."

In July 2019, Ecumenical Patriarch Bartholomew said the path Filaret had taken was wrong.

On 5 December 2019, the Holy Synod of the OCU decided concerning how Filaret will be treated after the UOC-KP will have been liquidated. The holy synod decided that Filaret had "the right for a life-long stay and use for his activity a complex of buildings at the city of Kyiv, Pushkinskaya Street, 36.", "[...] a life-long right to worship [i.e. hold liturgies] at the Volodymyr Cathedral of Kyiv", and that "[t]he life-long material maintenance of the Honorary Patriarch Filaret and the financing of a religious organization in the form of a mission shall be made by deductions from the Volodymyr Cathedral of the city of Kyiv and voluntary donations." The synod also emphasized that the opinion that the OCU "wants to throw Patriarch Filaret out" was not true and unjustifiably provoked misunderstandings among believers and the public.

On the same day, in an interview to BBC Ukraine, Epiphanius said: "Bishop Filaret remains the Bishop of the OCU until now. If you have noticed, during the Holy Synod, his place awaits until now. He is self-isolated, has a small number of supporters who surround him, but we believe he will change his mind and will continue to be with us." Epiphanius added: "[Filaret] overestimated his capabilities because he had high support from the people according to sociological polls. Bishop Filaret, even during the meetings of the Holy Synod, told us that "if you do not listen to me and obey my instructions, I will go out, call on the people, and the people and the clergy will definitely support me"".

On 28 December, the OCU officially stated that Filaret was a "retired bishop" with "no canonical or statutory rights to convene and hold church meetings, to elect and ordain bishops." The OCU added that "on the basis of Canon 4 of the Second Ecumenical Council [...] all acts committed by the Honorary Patriarch Filaret contrary to the canons and the Statute of the Church are void. [...] [E]very person declared 'bishop' in an illicit way by the Honorary Patriarch Filaret and 'appointed', in particular, to a see where there is already a licit bishop, is not a bishop".

==== Suspension of Filaret from the OCU's Holy Synod ====
On 4 February 2020, the synod of the OCU decided that Filaret remained part of the episcopate of the OCU, but that he had lost the canonical responsibility and rights associated with the governance of his diocese. The synod also decided to strip Filaret of his place at the Holy Synod of the OCU. The Holy Synod of the OCU also stated that the bishops consecrated by Filaret had no valid holy order. The press service of the UOC-KP said the decision to remove Filaret from the Holy Synod of the OCU was non-canonical since he was already the primate of the UOC-KP. The press release added that a similar decision to declare Filaret's ordination null and void had also been taken by the Moscow Patriarchate and that after the Moscow Patriarchate's "ban", the overwhelming majority of the OCU, including its primate, had been consecrated by Filaret and other archpastors.

On 25 August 2024, Filaret met a delegation of the Ecumenical Patriarchate and called for "Pan-Ukrainian Local Council, which will unite all three branches of [Ukrainian] Orthodoxy".

== Filaret's followers ==
In December 2019, according to the Department of Religions and Nationalities of Ukraine, 10 to 15 parishes wanted to be under the jurisdiction of Patriarch Filaret.

On 3 February 2020, Bishop Filaret (Panku) of East Moldova of the OCU left the OCU and asked to join the UOC-KP. In response, the OCU excommunicated Panku and notified Patriarch Daniel of Romania and Metropolitan Peter of Bessarabia that Panku had joined a schismatic group. However, the Romanian Orthodox Church does not recognise the OCU as a legitimate Church and maintains relationships with the Ukrainian Orthodox Church of the Moscow Patriarchate (UOC-MP).
