= Orthodox Diocese of San Giulio =

The Orthodox Diocese of San Giulio is an Eastern Orthodox jurisdiction; it claims to have been originally established in 1995 by the Ukrainian Orthodox Church – Kyiv Patriarchate before its amalgamation in 2018 to form the Orthodox Church of Ukraine.
