= Symeon Shostatsky =

Ukrainian Eastern Orthodox bishop

His Eminence Symeon
- Metropolitan of Vinnytsia and Bar
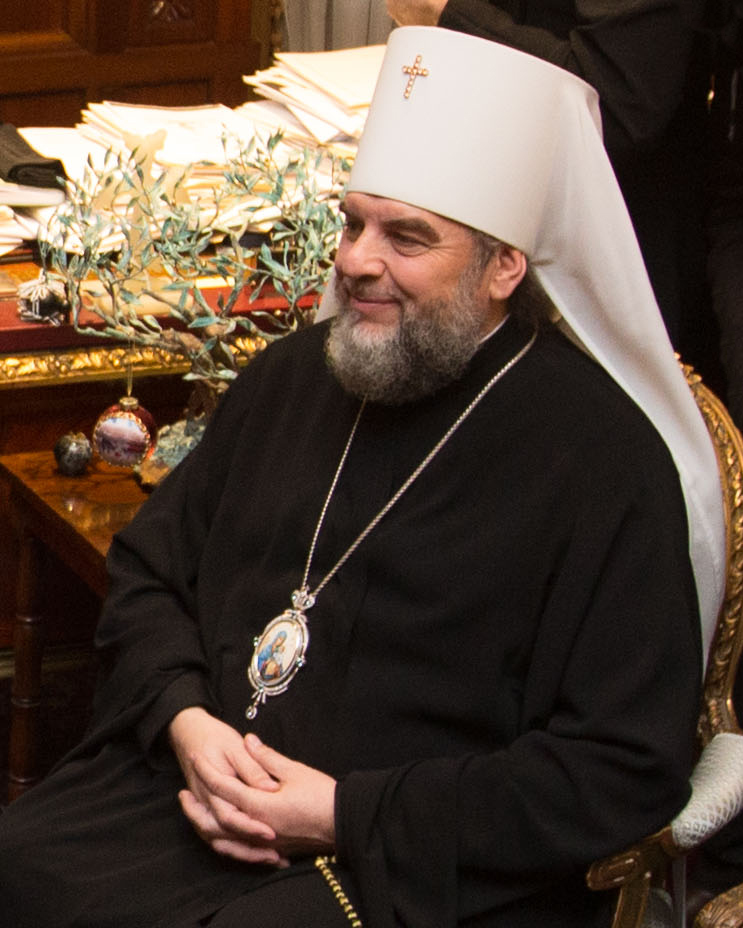
- Metropolitan Symeon visiting Ecumenical Patriarch Bartholomew I of Constantinople on January 5, 2019.
- Native name: Володимир Іванович Шостацький
- Church: Orthodox Church of Ukraine
- Metropolis: Vinnytsia and Bar
- Installed: 15 December 2018
- Previous posts: Bishop (later Archbishop) of Volodymyr-Volyn (1996-2007) | Metropolitan of Vinnytsia and Bar (in UOC-MP) (2007-2018)

Orders
- Ordination: April 28, 1991
- Consecration: May 4, 1996 by Volodymyr (Sabodan)

Personal details
- Born: Volodymyr Ivanovych Shostatsky; November 3, 1962 (age 63) Raykivtsi, Khmelnytsky district of the Khmelnytsky region, Ukrainian SSR
- Education: Kyiv Theological Academy

Metropolitan Symeon (also romanized Simeon; born Volodymyr Ivanovych Shostatsky, Ukrainian: Володимир Іванович Шостацький, Russian: Владимир Иванович Шостацкий) is a bishop of the Orthodox Church of Ukraine and a member of its Holy Synod. He was born on November 3, 1962, in the village of Raykivtsi in the Khmelnytsky district of the Khmelnytsky region in Ukraine Together with Metropolitan Alexander Drabynko of Pereyaslav-Khmelnytsky, he joined the Orthodox Church of Ukraine. He had previously been a member of the Ukrainian Orthodox Church (Moscow Patriarchate), where in 1996, he was consecrated as the Metropolitan Bishop of Vinnytsia and Bar.

== Life ==
Volodymyr Ivanovych Shostatsky was born to a peasant family on November 3, 1962, in the village of Raykivtsi in the Khmelnytsky district of the Khmelnytsky region.

In 1980 he graduated from high school and served in the army until 1982. From 1983 to 1987 he studied at the Vinnytsia Medical Institute, and from 1987 to 1991 at the Moscow Theological Seminary.

=== In the UOC (MP) ===
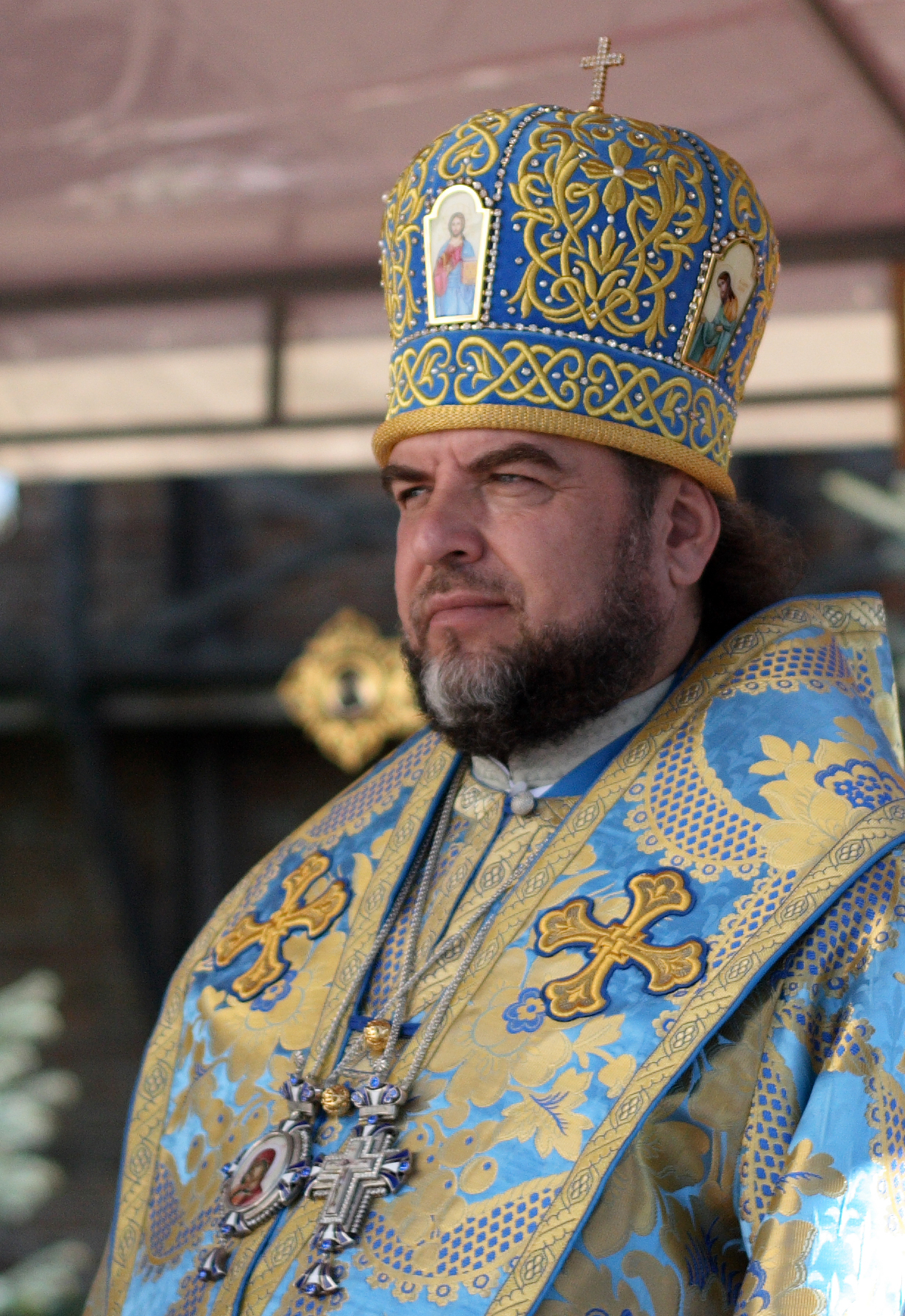
During the Liturgy in Zimnensky Monastery on September 24, 2010.

On December 6, 1990, in the Moscow Danilov Monastery, he became a monk named Symeon (Russian pronunciation: Simeon) in honor of Simeon Stylites. On January 14, 1991, he was ordained to the rank of hierodeacon, on April 28 he was ordained a hieromonk. From 1990 to 1994 he was a caretaker at the Patriarchal Residence in the Moscow Danilov Monastery.

In 1994 he became a sacrist in the Kiev Pechersk Lavra and entered the Kiev Theological Academy. On April 7, 1995, he was ordained to the rank of igumen (abbot), on November 23 of the same year he was made archimandrite.

On May 4, 1996, he was ordained bishop of Volodymyr-Volynskyi and Kovel, head of the newly formed Volodymyr-Volynskyi diocese.

On May 10, 2002, he was promoted to the rank of archbishop. On July 9, 2011, he was promoted to the rank of metropolitan.

Metropolitan Symeon was the only one out of 83 members of the Council of UOC-MP (November 13, 2018, Kiev Pechersk Lavra), who did not sign the resolution for breaking the communion between UOC-MP and Ecumenical Patriarchate of Constantinople.

== In the Orthodox Church of Ukraine ==
On December 15, 2018, he participated in the Unity Council and the creation of a local autocephalous Orthodox Church of Ukraine. He was one of the candidates for the position of primate, but in the elections lost to the metropolitan of the former UOC-KP Epiphanius of Kyiv, taking second place according to the results of voting. He received 28 votes against 36 for Epifaniy, that means he has a support inside UOC-KP and UAOC, because there were only 2 bishops from MP who participated in voting.

Together with the former primates of UOC-KP Filaret (Denysenko) and UAOC Macarius (Maletych) he became a lifelong member of the Holy Synod of the newly formed church.

After joining OCU in December he predicted slow but large-scale move of MP clergy to the newly formed church. He said about MP clergy position in case of joining OCU:

"Next, a few things will contribute to the formation of their position. The first and main condition is the Tomos, expected on January 6. The second condition is the law on the renaming of the UOC-MP (already adopted on December 19) and on the registration of the charters, so that each community has the right to decide on its own with whom to remain – with the Russian Church or the Ukrainian one. And the third condition is the recognition of the OCU by other Churches. Our priests are told directly: as soon as the OCU is recognized by other Churches; we can, perhaps, also join it. One way or another, you need to be prepared for a long process. This is like having a baby: it has already come into the world, but it still needs maternal care”.

As of January 24, 2019, "more than 30" MP parishes joined the diocese of metropolitan Symeon of Vynnytsa and Bar in OCU.
