= Epiphanius of Kyiv =

21st-century Metropolitan of the Orthodox Church of Ukraine

His Beatitude Epiphanius
- Metropolitan of Kyiv and All Ukraine (disputed)
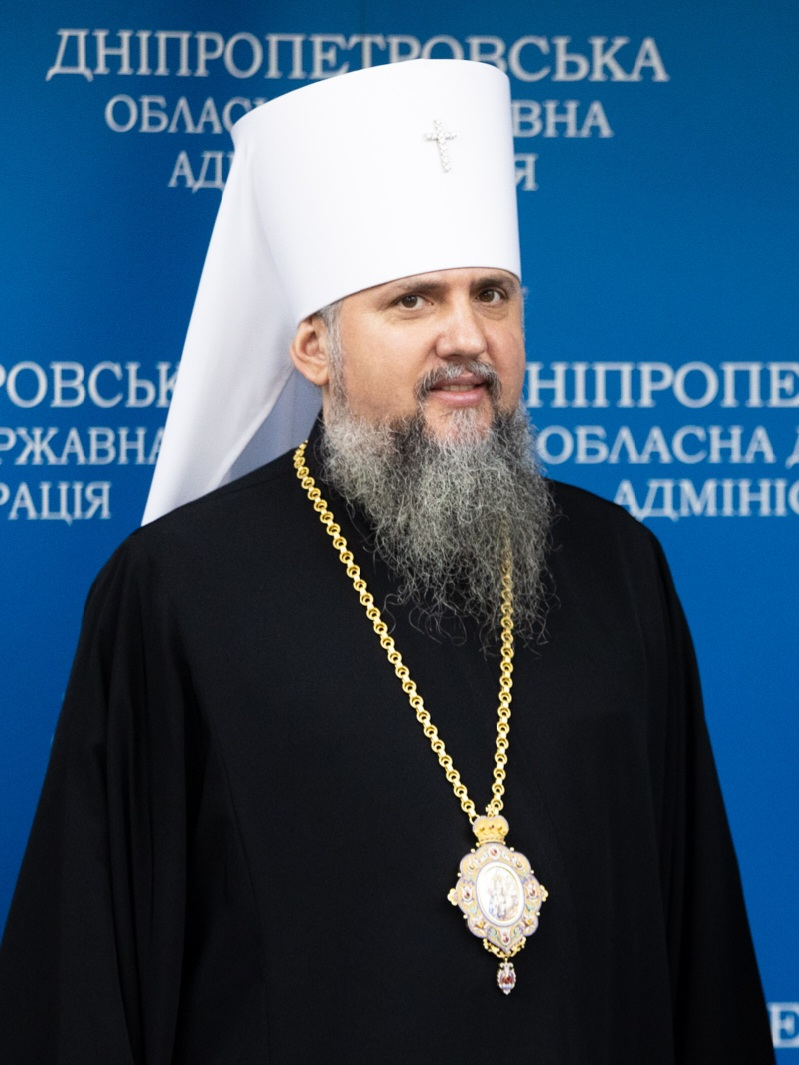
- Epiphanius in 2023
- Native name: Епіфаній
- Church: Orthodox Church of Ukraine
- Metropolis: Kyiv and All Ukraine
- See: Kyiv
- Elected: 15 December 2018
- Installed: 3 February 2019
- Opposed to: Metropolitan Onufriy (Berezovsky) as Metropolitan of Kyiv and All Ukraine
- Previous posts: Secretary of the Patriarch of Kyiv and All Rus'-Ukraine Filaret (25 January 2008) Governor of the Vydubychi Monastery (20 March 2008); Manager of the affairs of the Kyiv Patriarchate (30 May 2008); Bishop of Vyshhorod, vicar of the Kyiv diocese (21 October 2009); Rector of the Kyiv Orthodox Theological Academy and governor of the Pereiaslav-Khmelnytskyi diocese (27 July 2010) Metropolitan of Pereiaslav-Khmelnytskyi and Bila Tserkva and patriarchal governor (28 June 2013)

Orders
- Ordination: 20 January 2008 by Filaret (Denysenko)
- Consecration: 15 November 2009 by Filaret (Denysenko)
- Rank: Metropolitan bishop (since 2013)

Personal details
- Born: Serhii Petrovych Dumenko; Сергій Петрович Думенко; February 3, 1979 (age 47) Vovkove, Ivanivka Raion, Odesa Oblast, Ukrainian SSR, Soviet Union
- Education: Doctor of Theology
- Alma mater: Kyiv Orthodox Theological Academy
- Signature: Epiphanius's signature

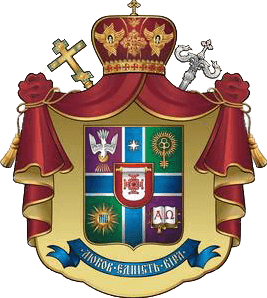
- Coat of arms: Epiphanius's coat of arms

Styles of Metropolitan Epiphanius of Kyiv and All Ukraine
- Reference style: His Beatitude
- Spoken style: Your Beatitude
- Religious style: Metropolitan

Metropolitan Epiphanius (Note: Also romanized as Yepifaniy, Epiphany, Epifaniy, or Epiphanios.) of Kyiv and All Ukraine (Ukrainian: Епіфаній, Митрополит Київський і всієї України, romanized: Epifanii, Mytropolyt Kyivskyi i vsiiei Ukrainy, secular name: Serhii Petrovych Dumenko, (Note: In this name that follows East Slavic naming customs, the patronymic is Petrovych and the family name is Dumenko.) Ukrainian: Сергій Петрович Думенко; born 3 February 1979) is the primate of the Orthodox Church of Ukraine (OCU), claiming the title of Metropolitan of Kyiv and All Ukraine.

Metropolitan Epiphanius served as the metropolitan bishop of Pereiaslav and Bila Tserkva, in the former original Ukrainian Orthodox Church (Kyiv Patriarchate) from 2013 to 2018. He was ordained over the diocese since 2010.

He was a professor of the Department of Biblical and Philological Disciplines of the Kyiv Orthodox Theological Academy. He was a member of the National Union of Journalists of Ukraine and of the International Federation of Journalists.

Although he claims the title of "Metropolitan of Kyiv and All Ukraine" and identifies as a canonical bishop of the Eastern Orthodox communion, as of 2026, he is recognized only by the Churches of Constantinople, Greece, Alexandria and Cyprus, while remaining unrecognized by the majority of Eastern Orthodox churches.

== Early life and education ==
Native of southern Ukraine, Serhii Petrovych Dumenko was born on 3 February 1979 in Vovkove, Berezivka Raion near Odesa. His childhood and school years were in the village of Stara Zhadova in Storozhynets Raion of Chernivtsi Oblast. In 1996, in Stara Zhadova, he graduated from high school of I-III grades.

In 1996, he entered the Kyiv Theological Seminary, where he graduated in 1999 with a first class degree. In the same year, he entered the Kyiv Theological Academy. He graduated as a doctor of theology in 2003, having successfully defended his PhD thesis on the "Formation of church-canonical collections in the Pre-Nicaeaen period and their characteristics".

From 2006 to 2007, he held an internship at the Athens National University in Greece in the Faculty of Philosophy.

On 30 August 2012, following his successful defense of his doctoral dissertation on the topic of the "Doctrine of the Orthodox Church on salvation in the context of the continuity of the Holy Fatherland", he was awarded a degree of Doctor of Theology.

== Ministry in the Kyiv Patriarchate ==
From 1 July 2003 to 31 December 2005, he served as the secretary-referent of the Rivne diocesan administration and the personal secretary of the Metropolitan of Rivne and Ostroh. From 26 August 2003 to 31 December 2005, he was a teacher of the Rivne Seminary, and also held the post of senior assistant inspector.

From 2003 to 2005, he led the "Rivne Pravoslavne" (transl. Rivne Orthodox) Internet portal, and was also a member of the editorial board of the religious newspaper Dukhovna Nyva (transl. Spiritual field). In December 2005, he was admitted to the National Union of Journalists of Ukraine.

Since the academic year 2007, he has been a teacher at the Kyiv Orthodox Theological Academy, and was appointed head of the philology department.

On 21 December 2007, with the blessing of Patriarch Filaret, Archbishop Demetrius (Rudyuk) of Pereiaslav-Khmelnytskyi gave him a tonsure as a monk in the Michael's Golden-Domed Monastery. He took the monastic name Epiphanius in honor of Epiphanius of Cyprus. On 20 January 2008, he was ordained hieromonk by Filaret. Later that month (25 January), he was appointed secretary of the Patriarch of Kyiv and All Rus'-Ukraine, Filaret.

In March 2008, he was ordained an archimandrite in St. Volodymyr's Cathedral. Later that month (20 March), he was appointed governor of Vydubychi Monastery in Kyiv. On 30 May 2008, he was appointed manager of the affairs of the Kyivan Patriarchate. On 7 October 2008, he was awarded the title of associate professor of the Kyiv Orthodox Theological Academy.

On 21 October 2009, at the Holy Synod of the UOC-KP he was elected Bishop of Vyshhorod, vicar of the Kyiv diocese. On 15 November 2009, he was ordained a bishop.

By the decision of the Holy Synod of the UOC-KP from 27 July 2010, he was appointed rector of the Kyiv Orthodox Theological Academy and the governor of the Pereiaslav-Khmelnytsky diocese. On 17 November 2011, he was awarded the title of professor of the Kyiv Orthodox Theological Academy.

On 23 January 2012, he was promoted to the rank of Archbishop. By the decision of the Bishops' Council of the UOC-KP on 28 June 2013, he was raised to the rank of Metropolitan of Pereiaslav-Khmelnytskyi and Bila Tserkva and was appointed patriarchal governor with the rights of the diocesan bishop. On 13 December 2017 he was named Metropolitan of Pereiaslav and Bila Tserkva.

In April 2019, he spoke in support of the law on the Ukrainian language.

On August 21, 2020, on St. Michael's Square in Kyiv, Metropolitan Epiphanius consecrated the renovated Wall of Remembrance of Heroes. He also consecrated the church on August 20 in honor of Saint Nectarios of Aegina in the village of Khutir Yasny in Kyiv Oblast. On August 29, on the Day of Remembrance of the Defenders of Ukraine, he honored the fallen Ukrainian servicemen.

== Primate of the Orthodox Church of Ukraine ==
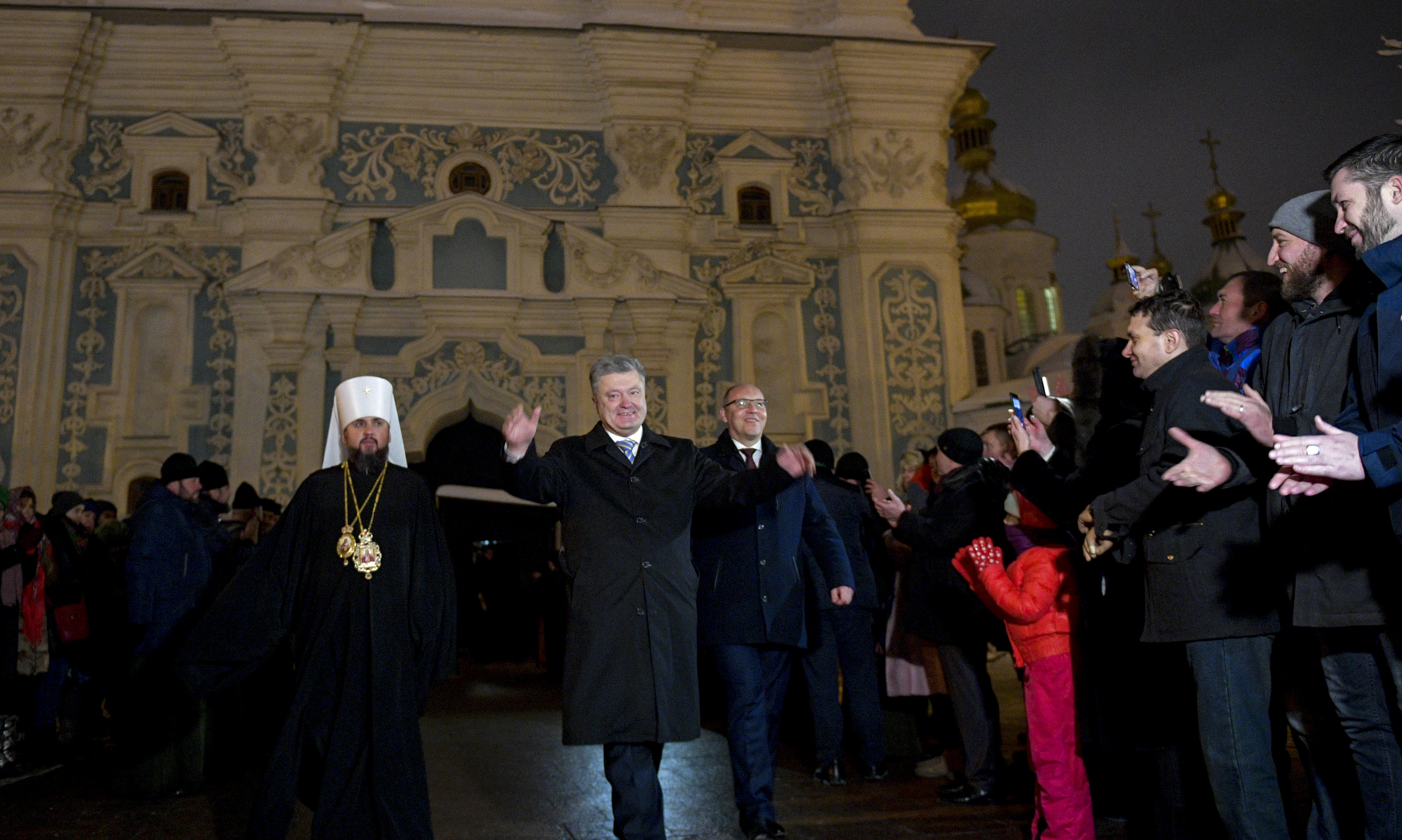
Epiphanius, then President Petro Poroshenko, and Andriy Parubiy on 15 December 2018

On 15 December 2018, at the unification council held in the Cathedral of St. Sophia, he was elected Metropolitan of Kyiv and All Ukraine, the first primate of the autocephalous Orthodox Church of Ukraine.

The official name of the primate the Orthodox Church of Ukraine is "His Beatitude Epiphanius, Metropolitan of Kyiv and all Ukraine".

Other Orthodox Churches consider Epiphanius and the “Orthodox Church of Ukraine” (OCU) as "schismatic".

=== Commemoration of the Patriarch of Moscow ===
On Sunday 16 December 2018, during Metropolitan Epiphanius' first Divine Liturgy as Metropolitan of the OCU following his election, he called for prayers for peace and unity in Ukraine. In the same liturgy, Metropolitan Epiphany also omitted Patriarch Kirill of Moscow from the list of brother primates with whom he is in communion who are usually commemorated at the Great Entrance. Metropolitan Epiphanius later explained in an interview with Ukrainian "Direct" TV channel: "At the moment I do not commemorate him [the Patriarch of Moscow] because we are in a state of war, so the Ukrainian people would not accept if the newly-elected primate commemorated the name of the Russian Patriarch".

During the Divine Liturgy on 7 January 2019, after the OCU received its official autocephaly on 5 January 2019, Metropolitan Epiphanius commemorated the name of Patriarch Kirill during the Great entrance. Epiphanius later told he had done this after the Ecumenical Patriarch had instructed him to do so, and that Filaret had instructed him (Epiphanius) not to mention Kirill.

=== Reception of the tomos of autocephaly ===
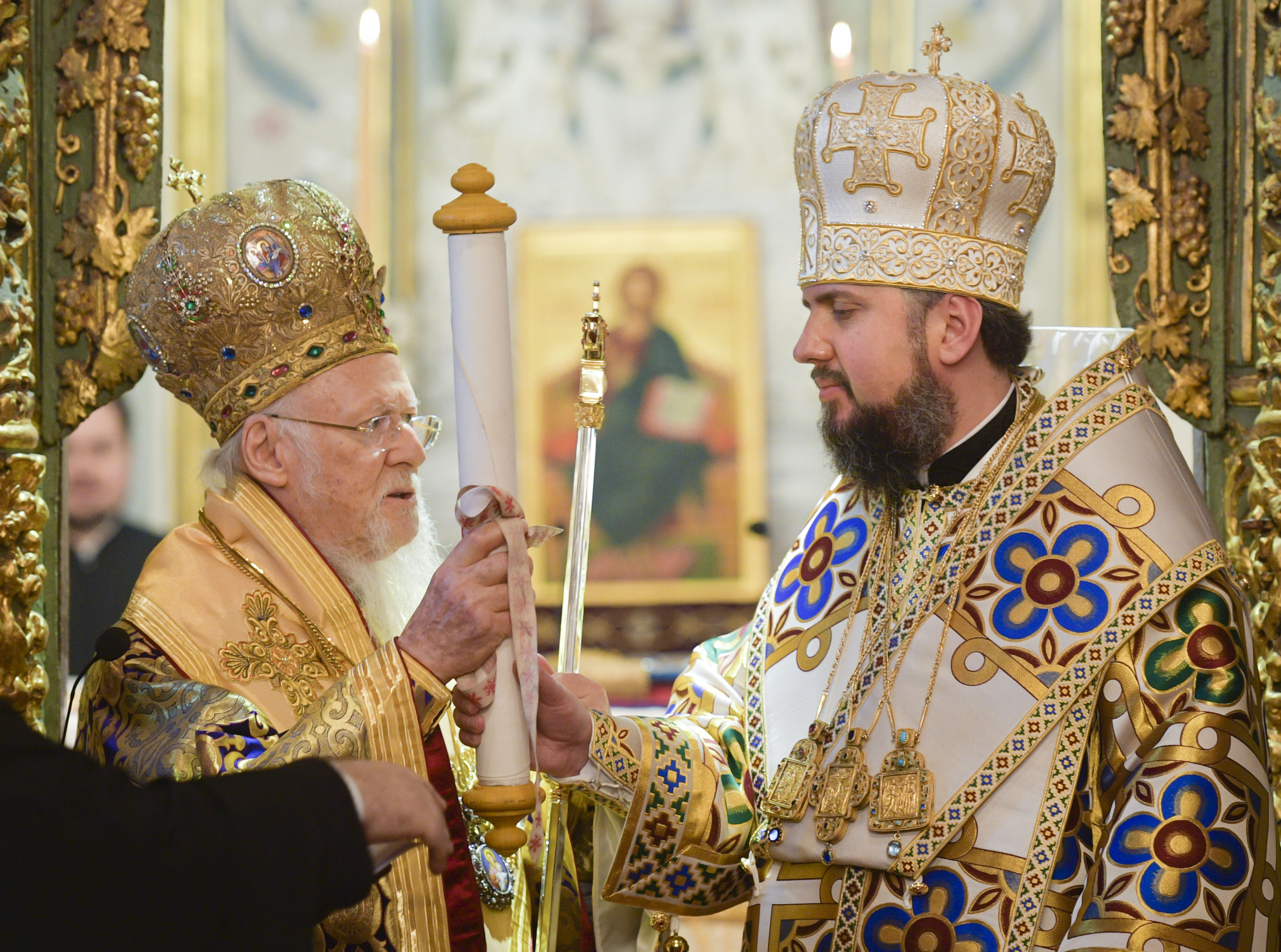
Ecumenical Patriarch Bartholomew (left) handing the tomos of autocephaly to Metropolitan Epiphanius (right)

On 5 January 2019, Patriarch Bartholomew and Metropolitan Epiphanius held a liturgy in St. George's Cathedral in Istanbul; the tomos of autocephaly of the Orthodox Church of Ukraine was signed thereafter, still in St. George's Cathedral. The tomos "has come into force from the moment of its signing". The signing of the tomos officially established the autocephalous Orthodox Church of Ukraine.

After the tomos was signed, Metropolitan Epiphanius made a speech, in which he declared about Poroshenko: "Your name, Mr President, will forever go down in the history of the Ukrainian people next to the names of the rulers, of our prince Volodymyr the Great, Yaroslav the Wise, Kostyantyn Ostrozky and Hetman Ivan Mazepa".

On January 6, after a liturgy celebrated by Metropolitan Epiphanius and Patriarch Bartholomew, Patriarch Bartholomew read the tomos of the Orthodox Church of Ukraine (OCU) and then gave it to Metropolitan Epiphanius.

On 8 January 2019, the tomos was brought back to Istanbul so that all the members of the Holy Synod of the Ecumenical Patriarchate could sign the tomos. The tomos was signed by all members of the synod of the Ecumenical Patriarchate on 9 January 2019. The tomos, signed by all members of the synod of the Ecumenical Patriarchate, was brought back to Ukraine on the morning of 10 January 2019.

=== Enthronement ===
It was planned that Epiphany would be enthroned on 3 February 2019, which is also the date of his 40th birthday. Thereafter, the first synod of the OCU was to take place. The monasteries of Mount Athos declined to send a delegation for the enthronement ceremony "not because the Fathers do not recognize its legitimacy or canonicity, but because they have chosen to stick with what has become official practice and accept invitations only to the enthronement of their ecclesiastical head, the Ecumenical Patriarch". Two abbots of Mount Athos were planned to come at the enthronement but were to be part of the delegation of the Ecumenical Patriarchate. On 1 February, once in Kyiv, Archimandrite Ephrem, one of the two Athonite abbots, was hospitalized for a heart attack. On 2 February, Archimandrite Ephrem was visited by Epiphanius.

As planned, Epiphanius was enthroned on 3 February 2019, in St. Sophia's Cathedral, Kyiv. Filaret was not present due to health conditions, so he sent his written congratulations to the primate Epiphanius, Filaret's congratulations were written by him and read at the end of the liturgy. Archimandrite Ephrem, who had been hospitalized on 1 February 2019, was not present at the ceremony of enthronement, but a hieromonk of Ephrem's monastery was present during the ceremony of enthronement. A monk from a skete of the Koutloumousiou Monastery was also present during the ceremony of enthronement.

The first meeting of the holy synod of the OCU took place on 5 February 2019.

=== Conflict with Filaret ===
A conflict erupted between Filaret and Epiphanius because of disagreements concerning the model of governance, the management of the diaspora, and the name and the statute of the OCU.

According to Filaret, the agreement reached at the unification council was as follows: "the primate is responsible for the external representation of the Ukrainian Orthodox Church (UOC), and the patriarch is responsible for the internal church life in Ukraine, but in cooperation with the primate. The primate shall do nothing in the church without the consent of the patriarch. The patriarch chairs the meetings of the Holy Synod and the UOC meetings for the sake of preserving unity, its growth, and affirmation." Filaret considers this agreement has not been fulfilled.

In an interview with Radio Ukraine, Filaret claimed that he was tricked and betrayed by Epiphanius.

=== Concelebration with Montenegrin schismatic ===
On May 29, 2019, during a liturgy at St. Michael's Golden-Domed Monastery commemorating the 19th anniversary of its restoration, Metropolitan Epiphanius concelebrated with Bojan "Boris" Bojović, the disputed metropolitan of the Montenegrin Orthodox Church, which is considered to be in schism by the entire Eastern Orthodox communion. Following the incident, Epiphanius apologized, stating that the concelebration had occurred unintentionally.

=== Position on liberalization and LGBT issues ===
In 2019 Epiphanius characterized LGBT ideas as "Western propaganda" and "sin".

Epiphanius stated in 2022 that he supports liberal reforms in the Ukrainian Orthodox Church "to avoid this conservatism", "so that the church would be open".

In particular, answering a question about a possible softening of the church's position on LGBT issues, he replied: "Well, it's like a difficult question that we shouldn't raise at the beginning of our journey. Because you know how the Ukrainian society perceives this issue. Therefore, at now we need to work on it so that the Ukrainian society perceives it... This is a long way and we will work on it."

=== Russo-Ukrainian War ===
Following the February 2022 Russian invasion of Ukraine and escalation of the Russo-Ukrainian War, Archbishop Daniel of the Ukrainian Orthodox Church of the USA reported that Epiphanius planned to remain in Ukraine during the fighting. As Primate of the Ukrainian Orthodox Church, he demanded that his Russian counterpart Kirill of Moscow help remove the bodies of Russian soldiers who perished, questioning his loyalty to Russian President Vladimir Putin.

The Metropolitan repeatedly condemned Russia's actions, asking for help from the international community and suggesting second Nuremberg trials in order to prosecute the crimes committed by Russia against Ukraine. Along with other local bishops, he offered their churches as shelters from the bombings. He also appealed to Patriarch Kirill of Moscow to arrange the repatriation of dead Russian soldiers in Ukraine. The Metropolitan claimed to be a target of the Russian forces.

=== Stepan Bandera related controversies ===
Epiphanius has been involved in several controversies over his public expressions of support for Stepan Bandera, a Ukrainian nationalist and Nazi collaborater.

On 12 April 2019, during a visit to the Lviv National Agrarian University, Epiphanius praised Bandera, describing him as a "genius of the Ukrainian national nation-creating spirit." He also referred to Bandera as a distinguished graduate of the university and stated: "When we are called Banderites, we are proud of this."

On 19 June 2023, Epiphanius consecrated an icon for the 104th Territorial Defence Brigade of the Rivne region at St. George's Men's Monastery. The icon depicted Stepan Bandera alongside a flag of the Organisation of Ukrainian Nationalists (OUN). It also featured Yevhen Konovalets and Roman Shukhevych, other prominent controversial Ukrainian nationalist figures.

== Academic and social activities ==
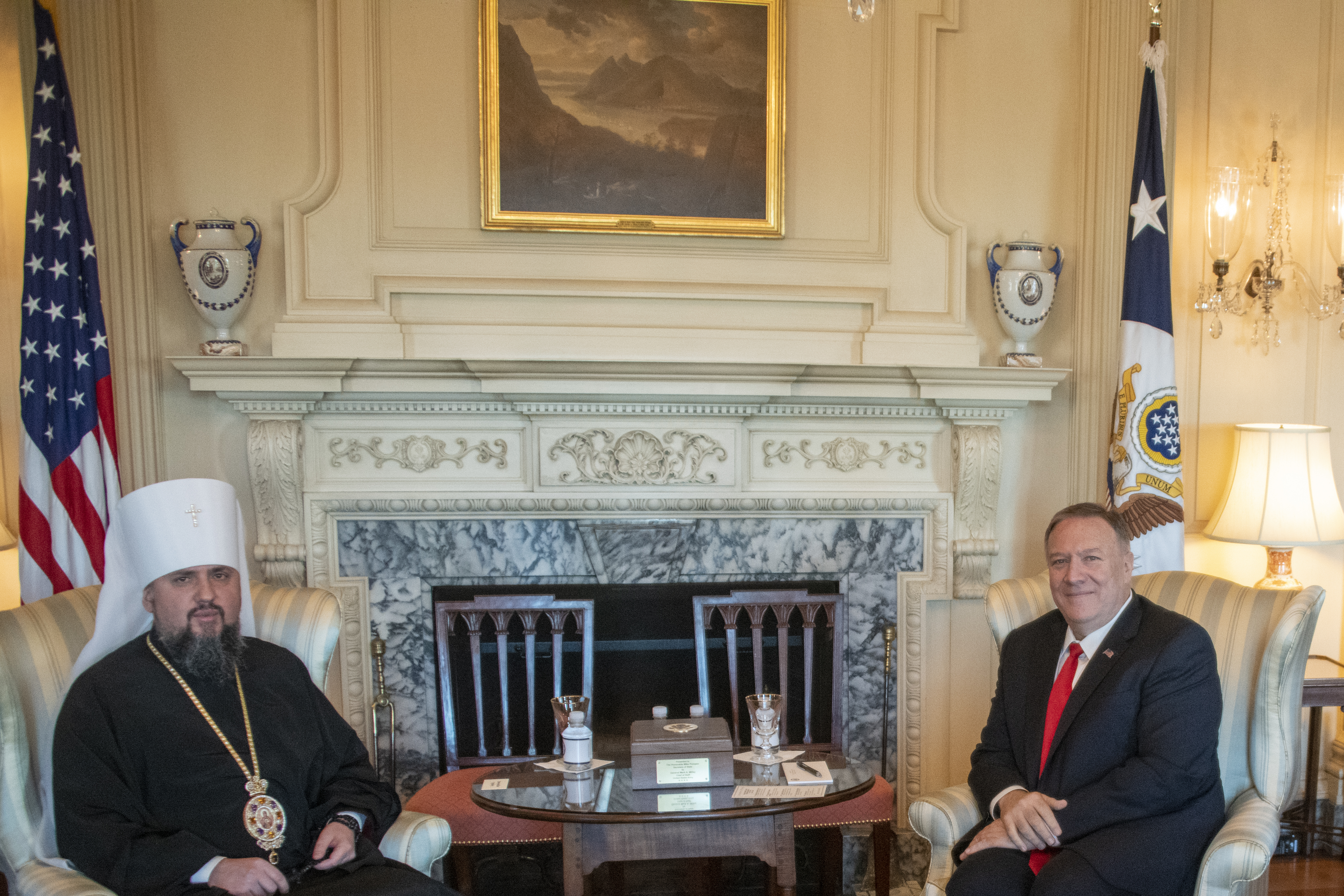
Epiphanius with US Secretary of State Mike Pompeo in 2019

Epiphanius is the head of the editorial board of scientific specialized editions Proceedings of the Kyiv Theological Academy and Theological Bulletin of the Kyiv Orthodox Theological Academy.

He is also an author of more than 50 publications, including several monographs about Orthodox theology.

Epiphanius is an active religious leader and social activist. He participates in many scientific and educational activities, and has made a significant personal contribution to the development of Ukrainian religious education and science and the development and strengthening of the Ukrainian state. He received recognition for this contribution from both the state and the Church in the form of orders.

== Awards ==
=== Orders ===
He has received the Order of the Holy Apostle and Evangelist John the Theologian, the Order of the Holy Equal-to-apostles Knyaz Volodymyr the Great of the Third Degree, the Order of the Holy Archangel Michael and the Order of the Holy Cross of the Montenegrin Orthodox Church.

He has also received awards and honors with the Order of Merit of ІІ and III degrees, a letter of the Cabinet of ministers of Ukraine, thanks to the Prime Minister of Ukraine, a letter of the Verkhovna Rada of Ukraine, decorations of the Ministry of Defense of Ukraine, Ministry of Internal Affairs of Ukraine, command Army of Ukraine, with distinctions of the National Pedagogical Dragomanov University and the Ukrainian People's Embassy.

2019 Athenagoras Human Rights Award

=== Academic ===
In March 2019, he was named an Honorary doctor of the National Pedagogical Dragomanov University.

== See also ==
- Unification council of the Orthodox churches of Ukraine
- Conflict between Filaret and Epiphanius

== Notes ==
Eastern Orthodox Church titles
Preceded by Position established; merging from Ukrainian Orthodox Church – Kyiv Patriarchate and Ukrainian Autocephalous Orthodox Church (see Unification council of the Orthodox churches of Ukraine)	Metropolitan of Kyiv and All Ukraine (Orthodox Church of Ukraine); 2018–	Succeeded by Incumbent
Preceded by Demetrius (Rudiuk) (as Metropolitan of Pereyaslav-Khmelnytskyi and Boryspil)	Metropolitan of Pereyaslav-Khmelnytskyi and Bila Tserkva (Ukrainian Orthodox Church – Kyiv Patriarchate); 2010–2018	Succeeded by Oleksandr (Drabynko) (as Metropolitan of Pereyaslav and Vyshneve)
Preceded by Laurentius (Myhovych)	Bishop of Vyshhorod vicar of Kyiv eparchy (Ukrainian Orthodox Church – Kyiv Patriarchate); 2009–2010	Succeeded by Agapetus (Humeniuk)
