= Oleksandr Drabynko =

Metropolitan bishop (1949)

His Eminence Oleksandr
- Metropolitan of Pereyaslav-Vyshneve
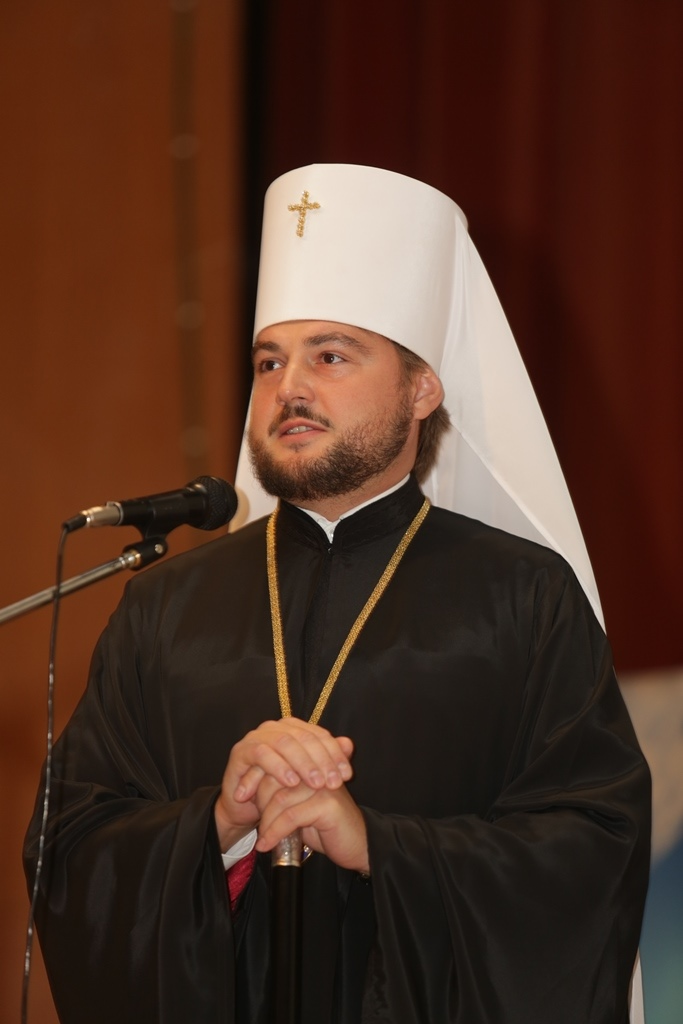
- Church: Orthodox Church of Ukraine
- See: Kyiv
- Elected: 4 March 2019
- Predecessor: See created
- Previous posts: Bishop (later Archbishop and Metropolitan) of Pereyaslav-Khmelnytskyi and Vyshneve (UOC-MP) (2007-2018)

Orders
- Ordination: 28 July 2006 by Volodymyr (Sabodan)
- Consecration: 14 December 2007 by Volodymyr (Sabodan)

Personal details
- Born: Oleksandr Mykolayovych Drabynko; March 18, 1977 (age 49) Korets, Rivne Oblast, Ukrainian SSR, Soviet Union
- Denomination: Eastern Orthodox Christianity
- Education: Kyiv Theological Academy (2002)

Metropolitan Oleksandr (Ukrainian: Митрополит Олександр, secular name Oleksandr Mykolayovych Drabynko, Ukrainian: Олександр Миколайович Драбинко; born 18 March 1977) is a metropolitan bishop of Pereyaslav and Vyshneve of the Orthodox Church of Ukraine. His full title is His Eminence Oleksandr, Metropolitan of Pereyeslav-Vyshneve. For a long time Oleksandr Drabynko was a personal secretary of Volodymyr Sabodan. According to Metropolitan Jonathan Yeletskykh, “being the personal secretary of His Beatitude Volodymyr, he practically ruled the entire UOC and even shaped the course of the UOC. And especially in the last three years of the life of the seriously ill Primate of the UOC".

== Biography ==
He was born on 18 March 1977 in Korets, Rivne Oblast, into a family of government officials.

He graduated from the Moscow Theological Seminary and later the Kyiv Theological Academy in 2002, becoming a candidate of theology for his dissertation "Eastern Orthodoxy in post-totalitarian Ukraine (milestones of history)" (see "Works section").

In 2003–2005, Drabynko was a coauthor and anchorman of the television program "Pravoslavnyi Mir" (Russian: «Православний Міръ», the Orthodox World), which was produced by the Main Editorial Office of information programs of the UOC-(MP).

At his ordination as bishop of Pereyaslav-Khmelnytskyi and Vyshneve (vicarate of the Diocese of Kyiv), which was led by the primate of the UOC-(MP), Volodymyr (Sabodan), 45 bishops of the Russian Orthodox Church participated.

On 15 December 2018, he joined the new Orthodox Church of Ukraine at the Unification council in Kiev. He was one of only two UOC-MP bishops who joined the OCU (the other was Metropolitan Symeon (Shotatsky)).

== Works ==
- Eastern Orthodoxy in post-totalitarian Ukraine (milestones of history) ("Православие в посттоталитарной Украине (вехи истории)"). pereyaslav-eparchia.kiev.ua. 1 March 2015
- The word of Archimandrite Oleksandr Drabynko at his betrothal to Bishop Pereyaslav-Khmelnytskyi. www.orthodox.org.ua.
