= Unification council of the Eastern Orthodox churches of Ukraine =

2018 council to unite all main Eastern Orthodox churches of Ukraine into one church

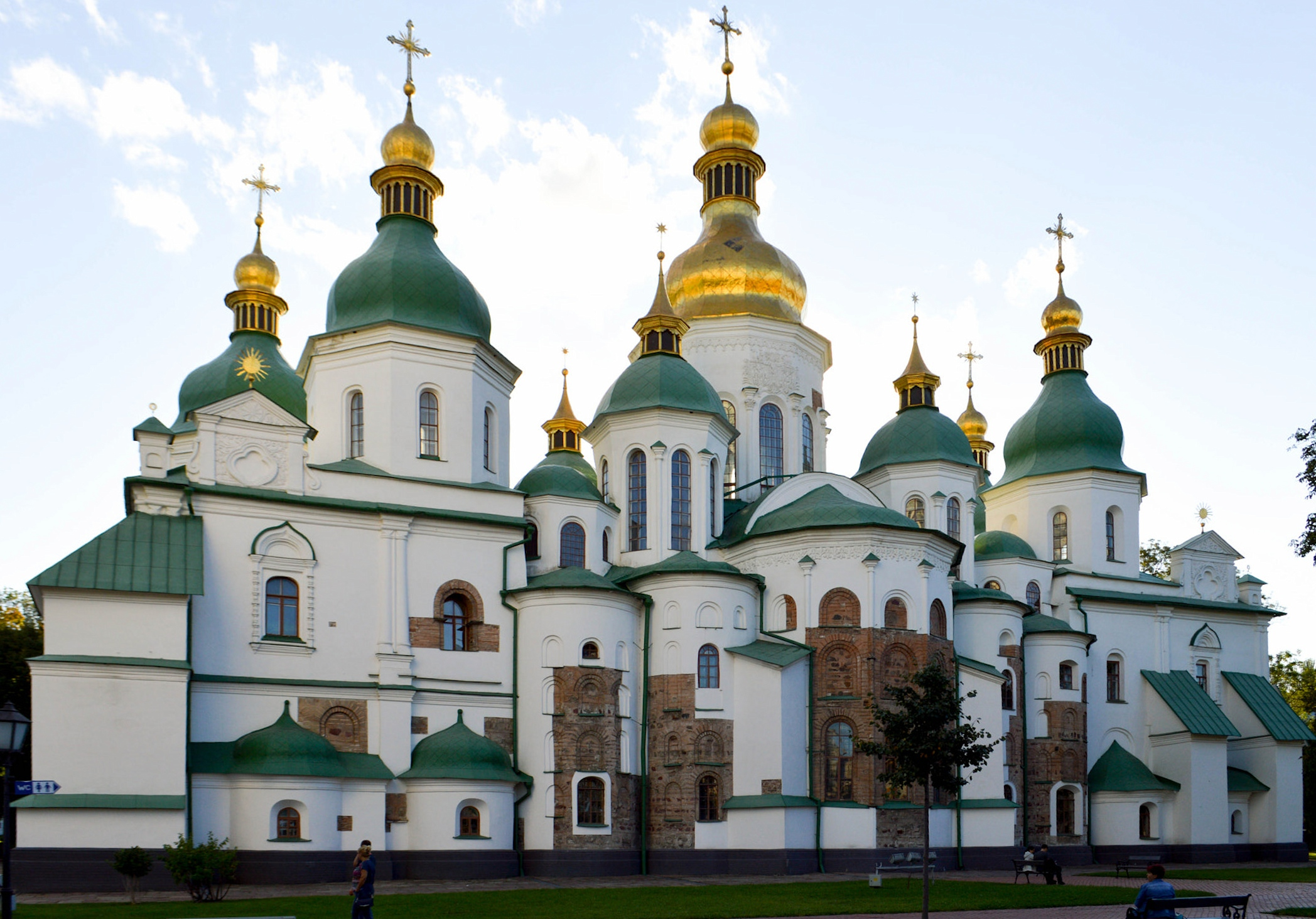
- Saint Sophia's Cathedral, Kyiv, where the council took place
- Date: 15 December 2018
- Accepted by: Ecumenical Patriarchate of Constantinople, Orthodox Church of Ukraine
- Convoked by: Ecumenical Patriarchate of Constantinople
- President: Metropolitan Emmanuel (Adamakis) of France
- Attendance: 192 or 200
- Topics: Unification of all the main Eastern Orthodox churches of Ukraine (UOC-KP, UAOC, UOC-MP) into one single church (OCU), election of the primate of this church and adoption of its charter
- Documents and statements: Charter of the Orthodox Church of Ukraine
- Location: Saint Sophia's Cathedral, Kyiv

The Unification council of the Eastern Orthodox churches of Ukraine (Ukrainian: Об'єднавчий собор українських православних церков, lit. 'Unity Sobor of Ukrainian (Eastern) Orthodox Churches') is a council which was held on 15 December 2018 in the St Sophia's Cathedral in Kyiv. The council voted to unite the existing Ukrainian Eastern Orthodox churches (the UOC-KP, the UAOC and parts of the UOC-MP) through their representatives, on the basis of complete canonical independence. All the members of the UOC-KP and the UAOC, and two members of the UOC-MP, merged into the Orthodox Church of Ukraine and the unification council elected Epiphanius of Kyiv as its first primate.

== History ==
=== Three Eastern Orthodox churches in Ukraine ===
Since the end of the 20th century, three Eastern Orthodox jurisdictions have existed in Ukraine.

- The Ukrainian Orthodox Church (Moscow Patriarchate) (UOC-MP) which is part of the Russian Orthodox Church and thus under the Moscow Patriarchate. This church was, until 11 October 2018, the only Orthodox church in Ukraine recognized by other Orthodox churches.
- The Ukrainian Autocephalous Orthodox Church (UAOC), led by Metropolitan Makariy, which was independent, having been founded in 1921 following the establishment of the short-lived Ukrainian People's Republic and having survived the Soviet Union both outside and inside the country.
- The Ukrainian Orthodox Church – Kyiv Patriarchate (UOC-KP), led by Patriarch Filaret of Kyiv, an independent church which was founded in July 1992. In January 1992, after Ukraine gained its independence from the Soviet Union following its dissolution, Metropolitan of Kyiv Filaret of the UOC-MP convened an assembly at the Kyiv Pechersk Lavra that adopted a request for autocephaly to the Moscow Patriarch. The Patriarchate of Moscow did not comply and asked Filaret to resign. Filaret did not resign and was suspended on 27 May 1992 by the UOC-MP. The bishops loyal to Metropolitan Filaret and a similar group from the Ukrainian Autocephalous Orthodox Church organized a unifying synod which was held on 25–26 June 1992. The delegates agreed to form a combined church named the Ukrainian Orthodox Church - Kyiv Patriarchate under a patriarch they elected, Mstyslav of the UAOC. Mstyslav never approved the union between the UAOC and the UOC-KP. Filaret was defrocked on 11 July 1992 by the Russian Orthodox Church. After the death of Patriarch Mstyslav in 1993, the UOC-KP was headed by Patriarch Volodymyr. In July 1995, upon the death of Volodymyr, Filaret was elected head of the UOC-KP by a vote of 160-5. Filaret was anathematized by the Russian Orthodox Church in 1997.

The UAOC and the UOC-KP were not recognized by other Orthodox churches and were considered schismatic. ROC officials stated that the anathematization of Filaret was "recognized by all the Local Orthodox Churches including the Church of Constantinople". The synod of the Ecumenical Patriarchate did indeed recognize, in a July 1992 letter to Patriarch Alexy II, the defrocking of Filaret by the ROC, and the Ecumenical Patriarch recognized the anathematization of Filaret in a letter of April 1997 to Patriarch Alexy II.

=== Previous attempts at unification ===
In 2002, Filaret Denisenko said: "The Ukrainian Orthodox Church-Kyivan Patriarchate [UOC-KP] and the Ukrainian Autocephalous Orthodox Church [UAOC], are not separated in faith, by position as to church canons, by their views on building up the Ukrainian state. Therefore, as we have no disagreements between us".

In October 2009 Bishop Makariy (Maletych) formulated the idea of a single local Ukrainian church under the Ecumenical Patriarchate's jurisdiction, which would be the result of the union between the UAOC and the UOC-KP. At that time Makariy had not yet become the head of the UAOC. Patriarch Filaret, the head of the UOC-KP, expressed support for the idea of a united autocephalous Ukrainian church in October 2011.

Preparations for unification of the UAOC and the UOC-KP took place in 2011 between the episcopates of both churches. In the end, the unification council between the two churches, which was scheduled to take place on 14 September 2015 between the UAOC and the UOC-KP, never took place as both churches could not agree on the future statutes of a united Ukrainian church. This unification attempt therefore failed, Makariy blamed this failure on Philaret's inability to negotiate. Before this, according to Filaret in 2015, the UAOC and the UOC-KP already had had four attempts at negotiations in the previous 20 years, the 2015 negotiation being the fifth. On 14 December 2018, Makariy declared in an interview to the channel NEWSONE that the UOC-KP and the UAOC could have been united "years ago" and blamed the UOC-KP for the fact that this union never happened.

=== After the October 2018 decision of the Ecumenical Patriarchate ===
Following the 11 October 2018 decision of the Ecumenical Patriarchate to lift the excommunication of the UOC-KP and the UAOC and to grant autocephaly to Ukraine, preparations began for a unification council to institute an autocephalous Ukrainian church that would unite the UOC-KP, the UAOC, and those members of the UOC-MP who were willing to join. The date of this unification council was not set at that stage and, according to Filaret Denisenko, was up to the Patriarch of Constantinople to decide but he said he hoped that thanks to his church's efforts this council could take place before the end of 2018. Filaret said that the issue of jurisdictional affiliation of parishes would be decided by vote of the congregation of each parish. It was believed that a united Ukrainian church was a compulsory step before Ukraine could be granted the Tomos (formal decree) of autocephaly from the Patriarch of Constantinople.

On 12 October 2018, the UOC-KP communicated that the 11 October decision by the Ecumenical Patriarchate had restored the canonical recognition of the episcopate and clergy of the Kyiv Patriarchate. However, it was later clarified that Filaret was considered by the Ecumenical Patriarchate only as "the former metropolitan of Kyiv", and Makariy as "the former Archbishop of Lviv" and, on 2 November, that the Ecumenical Patriarchate did not recognize either the UAOC or the UOC-KP as legitimate and that their respective leaders were not recognized as primates of their churches. The Ecumenical Patriarchate declared that it recognized the sacraments performed by the UOC-KP and the UAOC as valid. The 11 October 2018 decision of the Ecumenical Patriarchate was viewed as a key step towards those two organizations merging into a single church independent from Moscow. The Russian Orthodox Church is linked to 12,000 parishes in Ukraine while the Kyiv Patriarchate and UAOC had about 6,000; however, it was believed that many of the Russian-controlled Ukrainian parishes may defect to the Kyiv organizations.

According to Filaret, he would undoubtedly be the winner in case of an election of the leader of a united Ukrainian Church "because Moscow will do everything to destroy the Ukrainian Orthodox Church. And therefore, in order to preserve the Ukrainian Orthodox Church and bring [sic] the cause to the end, [he] ha[s] to work to the end". Filaret declared he was ready to take the role of head of a united Ukrainian Church.

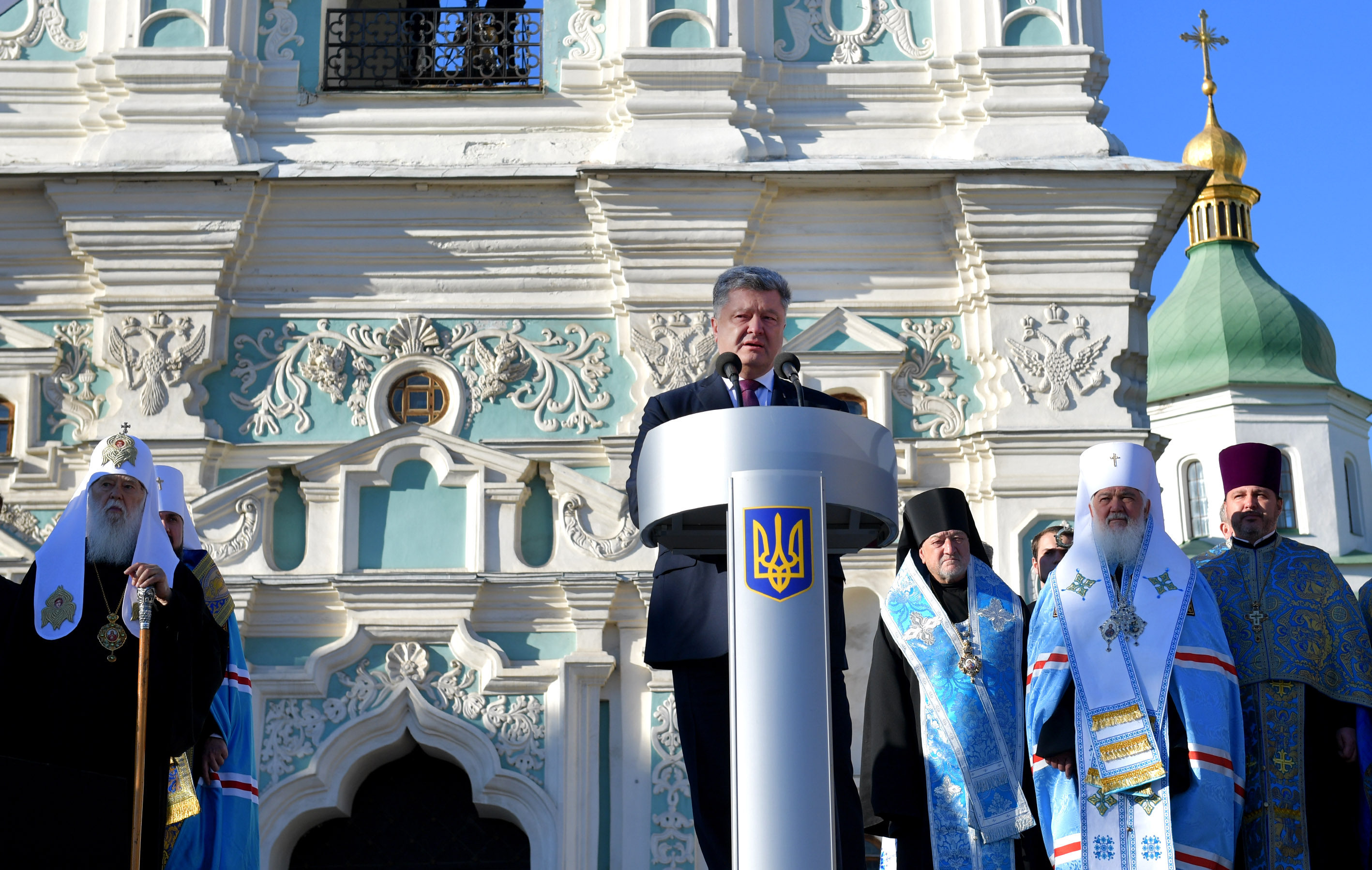
Ukrainian President Petro Poroshenko, Filaret and Makariy, 14 October 2018

On 20 October 2018, in an interview with Espreso TV, the head of the UAOC, Makariy, declared that there was no negotiations in the direction of a united Ukrainian church and that after his last meeting with Filaret, at which Filaret said that only his statute would be used, Makariy began to question the success of the union. On 27 October Makariy told Zik TV he would not nominate his candidacy during the future council and would instead "support the one to be offered by the Ecumenical Patriarch".

In an interview to the BBC on 2 November, Archbishop Job of the Ecumenical Patriarchate declared the united Ukrainian Church would be called "the Orthodox Church in Ukraine". However, Filaret, head of the UOC-KP, declared on 2 November to Radio Liberty that the united Ukrainian church would be called "Ukrainian Orthodox Church" with "Kyiv Patriarchate" as the church's second name.

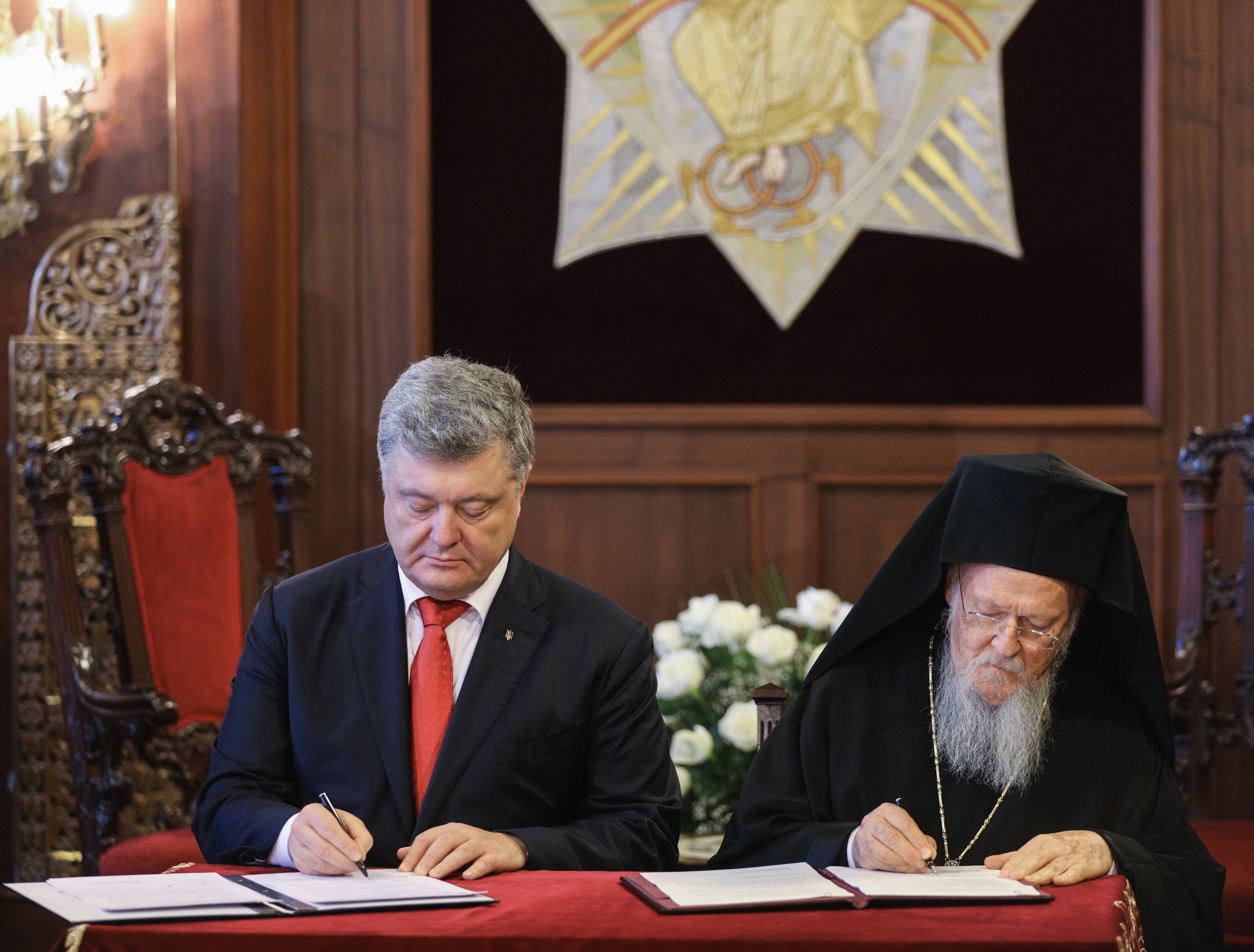
Bartholomew I of Constantinople with Ukrainian President Poroshenko, signing the cooperation agreement, 3 November 2018

On 3 November 2018, Ukrainian President Poroshenko, in visit in Turkey, signed a cooperation agreement with the Ecumenical Patriarch Bartholomew. According to Poroshenko, this agreement "creates all the conditions for the preparation process for a unification assembly and the process of providing a tomos to be brought into clear correspondence with the canons of the Orthodox Church." This agreement led to protests by hierarchs of the UOC-MP and the ROC. The text of the agreement was later released on 12 March 2019.

On 10 November, the website Vesti-Ukr allegedly revealed the heads of the UAOC and the UOC-KP, respectively Makariy and Filaret, had individually sent a letter to the Ecumenical Patriarchate. Makariy declared the same thing as in his interview to Zik TV: that he would not run for the position of head of the united Ukrainian Orthodox church. The real surprise was that Filaret also declared he accepted not to run for this position either. In the letter attributed to Filaret, Filaret allegedly asked the Ecumenical Patriarch to support the election of the member of the UOC-KP Epiphanius (Dumenko), currently serving as Metropolitan and patriarchal deputy in the UOC-KP and protégé of Filaret, as head of the united Ukrainian Orthodox church. On 16 November, Filaret's supposed letter was published by ZNAJ.ua; in this supposed letter, Filaret allegedly declares that he withdrew his candidacy at the request of the Ecumenical Patriarch.

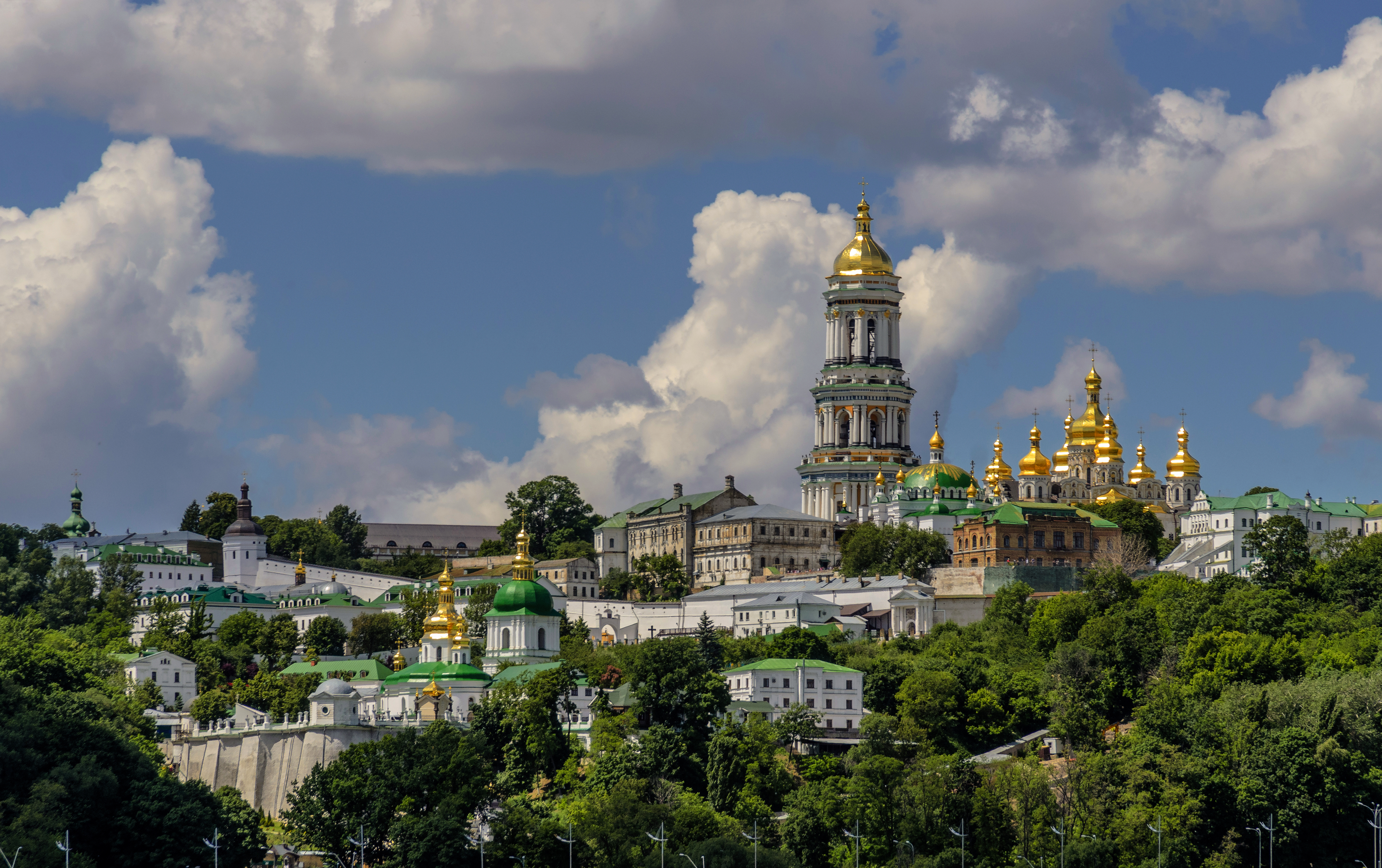
Kyiv Pechersk Lavra

Ukrainian House

On 13 November, at the initiative of President Poroshenko, a meeting between the episcopate of UOC-MP and President Poroshenko was scheduled to take place in Kyiv. (Note: There are some discrepancies concerning where the meeting had been planned to take place: either it was planned to take place in the Kyiv Pechersk Lavra or at the Ukrainian House. The meeting was planned since October 8. Either President Poroshenko decided on 13 November that the meeting would take place at the Ukrainian House or the UOC-MP decided after their council on 13 November that the meeting with Poroshenko would take place at the Kyiv Pechersk Lavra.) The UOC-MP refused to meet Poroshenko at the Ukrainian House, preferring to meet Poroshenko at the Kyiv Pechersk Lavra of the UOC-MP, and immediately notified Poroshenko of it; Poroshenko refused to hold the meeting at the Pechersk Lavra, preferring to meet members of the UOC-MP at the Ukrainian House. The same day, the UOC-MP issued an official statement in which the UOC-MP confirmed "its readiness to meet with the President of Ukraine, but on church territory." Nevertheless, in the evening, some representatives of the Council arrived at the Ukrainian House and met with Poroshenko. According to a BBC source from the president's administration, their number did not exceed 10 people, but they represented a much larger number of UOC-MP hierarchs supporting the creation of an autocephalous church. According to other sources, two metropolitans and the archbishop were present at the meeting with Poroshenko. In addition, Metropolitan Simeon of the UOC-MP had the letter of attorney to participate in a meeting with the president from 15 hierarchs of the UOC-MP. It was assumed that the voting of the hierarchs of the UOC-MP at the planned Council of the "Orthodox Local Church of Ukraine" will be carried out in a similar way (by the letter of attorney). On 14 November, some information concerning the meeting were revealed by Ukrainian President advisor Rostyslav Pavlenko.

On 14 November, GolosUA reported that on 15 November Metropolitan of France Emmanuel of the Ecumenical Patriarchate would come to Ukraine in order to organize the future unification council, he would also be the one leading said council. Allegedly, still according to GolosUA, the unification council would take place on 22 November 2018 and at that time the statute of the united Orthodox church of Ukraine and the text of the Tomos on autocephaly would be ready. The UOC-KP officially denied that the unification council's date had been officially released. On 15 November, UNN reported that Metropolitan Emmanuel had arrived in Kyiv to prepare the unification process; UNN also reported the unification council would allegedly take place on 22 November 2018.

On 19 November, the Ecumenical Patriarchate issued an official communiqué, stating that it "reiterates its sacred decision to grant the Tomos of Autocephaly to the Orthodox Church of Ukraine" and that the date for the Ukrainian unification council "will be presented within December 2018" by the synod of the Ecumenical Patriarchate. On the same day, Filaret issued an official communiqué "[i]n connection with the proliferation of a number of publications whose explicit purpose is to sow confusion in the Ukrainian Church and in society" In said communiqué he declared: "Self-nomination for candidacy in the Church is not allowed by the canons. Earlier it was reported that the bishops of the UOC-Kyiv Patriarchate would offer my candidacy for election as the Primate. I thank the bishops for expressing my trust in me, as well as thanking for the strong support from the fullness of the Kyiv Patriarchate and the whole society." He added that if he was chosen as candidate by the UOC-KP, he would inform the council of the UOC-KP of his decision and explain it.

The publication Levyy Bereg cited sources of ecclesiastical circles saying that the probable date of the unification council would be on December 9–10.

President Poroshenko declared on 23 November that the decision on the approval of the tomos to Ukraine should be taken on November 27–29 during the synod of the Ecumenical Patriarchate, and that Rostyslav Pavlenko, presidential advisor, would go to Istanbul to attend at the synod. Rostyslav Pavlenko went to Istanbul and 26 November, before the Synod, he was received by the Ecumenical Patriarch and had a conversation with him concerning "events in Ukraine and final steps toward the granting of the tomos of autocephaly (full independence) of the Orthodox Church in Ukraine". On 27 November Pavlenko told Interfax-Ukraine that the Ecumenical Patriarchate's communiqué concerning the granting of the tomos and the date of the unification council should be issued on 29 November. He said that at the unification council "the primate of this [united Ukrainian] Church will be elected, and he will go to Istanbul to receive [the Tomos]", he added that the arrival of the Ecumenical Patriarch in Kyiv was "not scheduled."

=== 29 November 2018 communiqué of the synod of the Ecumenical Patriarchate ===
The regular November session of the synod of the Ecumenical Patriarchate started on 27 November and ended on 29 November, lasting three days.

On 29 November, the synod ended. Some like the Religious Information Service of Ukraine had expected the Ecumenical Patriarchate to give the date of the unification council of the Orthodox Church of Ukraine. However, no date was given.

After the end of its synod, the Ecumenical Patriarchate later released, on its official website, an official communiqué. In said communiqué, the Ecumenical Patriarchate announced: 1) that the synod of the Ecumenical Patriarchate had decided to dissolve the AROCWE, "thereby entrusting its faithful to the Hierarchs of the Ecumenical Throne in Europe", 2) that, in anticipation of the granting of the Tomos of autocephaly to the Orthodox church of Ukraine, the synod of the Ecumenical Patriarchate had "drafted the Ukrainian Church's Constitutional Charter." On the same day, President Poroshenko said in an official speech to the Ukrainian nation that the date for the unification council for the Ukrainian church would be announced "soon" by the Ecumenical Patriarch.

On 3 December, parliament speaker Andriy Parubiy said the Ecumenical Patriarchate had approved the date of the unification council and that this council would be held in Kyiv, but Parubiy did not say on which date this council would be held.

On 4 December, the Greek website ROMFEA published the first page of the draft statute of the autocephalous church in Ukraine.

=== Disapprobation by the UOC-MP ===
On 13 November, the synod of the UOC-MP (an autonomous church of the Moscow Patriarchate) officially declared in a resolution that they considered the 11 October declaration of the Ecumenical Patriarchate "invalid" and canonically "null and void", and that the communion between the UOC-MP and the Ecumenical Patriarchate "is deemed impossible at present and thereby ceases". Two bishops of the UOC-MP did not sign the resolution, one of them being Metropolitan Simeon of Vinnytsia and Bar.

In an interview given on 14 November to the Vinnytsia Press Club, Metropolitan Simeon of Vinnytsia and Bar of the UOC-MP said he did not sign the UOC-MP resolution as he disagreed with some statements in the resolution and considered this resolution as "bad". He also said he would participate in the unification council. On 15 November, most of the clergy of Vinnytsia of the UOC-MP met in emergency, spontaneously and without the prior consent of its hierarchy. Most of the clergy of Vinnytsia publicly expressed its support to the 13 November resolution of the UOC-MP, and made an appeal to Metropolitan Simeon to ask him to hold a general meeting of the Vinnytsia eparchy. On 17 November, in a sermon, Metropolitan Simeon clarified that his refusal was his own decision, because, he stated, "not a single bishop represented the opinion of his eparchy or people at the Council, everyone spoke for themselves". On 20 November, an official monthly general meeting of the Vinnytsia eparchy chaired by Metropolitan Simeon was held; the Eparchial Council "categorically condemned the unauthorized assemblies held in the Vinnytsia eparchy" and "stated that the Resolution of the Bishops’ Council of the Ukrainian Orthodox Church, taken on November 13, 2018, is a document binding on all bishops, clergy and laity of the UOC and confirmed its readiness to comply with the Resolution by the entire Vinnytsia eparchy."

On 16 November 2018 Metropolitan Sophroniy (Dmitruk) of Cherkasy and Kaniv in his interview to BBC expressed his support for the creation of an autocephalous Church in Ukraine. He also said that he was going to participate in the unification council, and perhaps he would join the new autocephalous Church.

On 20 November 2018, chancellor of the UOC-MP, Metropolitan Anthony of Boryspil and Brovary, declared in an interview that "[s]anctions will be applied to the members of the Ukrainian Orthodox Church [of the Moscow Patriarchate] who participate in the 'Unification Council'".

On 7 December, the UOC-MP synod declared the unification council conveyed by the Ecumenical Pariarchate as unlawful. On the same day, Metropolitan Onufriy decided not to answer the Ecumenical Patriarchate's invitation to the unification council and sent back to the Ecumenical Patriariarch the letter of convocation he had received.

== Unification council ==
=== Convocation of the council ===
On 5 December, President Poroshenko declared the unification council would be held on 15 December. BBC News reported that the council would last one day and that, according to sources in Constantinople, said council would effectively be held on 15 December. On the same day, Archbishop Clement, head of the UOC-MP, declared that the UOC-MP would not participate in this unification council. Also on 5 December, counselor of Poroshencko, Rostislav Pavlenko, declared that the "Ukrainian Autocephalous church will be completely independent and equal amongst other canonically recognized Orthodox churches". He added: "The Ukrainian Church will be introduced into the diptych, that is, the list of independent Churches. She will become one of the fifteen, already fifteenth, universally recognized, independent Churches. And in this there is a fundamental difference". He also said the charter of the united Ukrainian Orthodox church would be approved by the bishops present at the unification council. Still on 5 December, Archbishop Herman of Chernivtsi and Khotyn of the UAOC said no candidate for the position of primate of the future united Ukrainian Orthodox church will be submitted by the UAOC.

On 6 December, the website ROMFEA published the letter of convocation to the unification council which was sent to the Orthodox hierarchs of Ukraine. This letter contained a convocation to the unification council with the procedure of election of the primate of the future church. The letter said that any bishop can bring with him a priest and either a monk or a member of the laity to the unification council, and that the monks/priest/laypersons brought this way, as well as the bishops, would have the right to vote during the council for the elaboration of the charter of the new church and the election of its primate. The vote will be secret and by ballot. Moreover, the President Poroshenko would be an observer during the council. On the same day, Metropolitan Alexander of Pereyaslav-Khmelnytskyi and Vishnevsky (ru) published on his Facebook page a letter, in Greek, sent by the Ecumenical Patriarchate to Metropolitan Onuphriy; Alexander also gave an unofficial Ukrainian translation of said letter in his post. In the letter to Onuphriy, the Ecumenical Patriarchate declared it still allowed him to be bishop "in a form of oikonomia and condescension" but that if he refused to take part in the unification council he would cease to be the Metropolitan of Kyiv. The letter to Onuphriy was published on 7 December, in Greek, on the Greek website ROMFEA.

=== Position of the UOC-KP ===
On 6 December 2018, the press secretary of the UOC-KP, Archbishop Yevstratiy Zorya, in response to the allegations of a religious expert who claimed that Filaret Denisenko would not run for the post of primate of the unified Ukrainian church, wrote on his Facebook page that on 19 November Filaret had already expressed his official position. In the same post, he linked to the previous official statement made on 19 November. Still on 6 December, the UOC-KP held a synod. The synod ended the same day and issued a communiqué. Among the decisions taken by the synod, one was to support the 19 November statement of Filaret. The communiqué also mentioned the UOC-KP would elect its candidate for the post of primate of the united Ukrainian church on 13 December 2018, two days before the unification council; the communiqué also mentioned that considering all the circumstances, the UOC-KP "is ready, if necessary, to postpone for some time the request to recognize it in a dignity of patriarchate, retaining that name within its boundaries and for domestic use". The council of the UOC-KP also decided that only the hierarchs (bishops) would have the right to vote during the unification council and that the vote be open and public. The UOC-KP synod's last two demands – that the voters of the unification council be only bishops, and that the vote to elect the new church's primate be open (not secret) – were contrary to those previously specified by the Ecumenical Patriarchate in its letter.

On 7 December, Filaret Denisenko said, "[Moscow] is spreading rumors that the patriarch will resign and will not run. This is not true. I will be patriarch to death, because the enthronement was in 1995. And no one will remove this grace" and that during the unification council the UOC-KP will "reject everything inappropriate if it is demanded from us".

In early December, Metropolitan Sophroniy Dmitruk of the UOC-MP, who was viewed as being in favor of autocephaly, said in an interview that if Filaret was elected by the unification council next to no one of the UOC-MP would join the new church.

According to the Russian news agency Vesti, on 8 December 2018 presidential advisor Rostislav Pavlenko met with Filaret and three of Filaret's bishops behind closed doors. It remains unknown what they were talking about behind closed doors.

On 10 December, Filaret said the UOC-KP might not participate at the unification council because of the disagreement with the Ecumenical Patriarchate concerning the procedure of vote of said council. The same day, the press secretary of the UOC-KP, Zorya, issued an official communiqué which states that "[t]he fact that the Kyiv Patriarchate has proposals as for the procedure of the Council or the election of the church's head does not mean that a common vision will not be agreed in the end".

On 11 December, Makariy Maletych, head of the UAOC, said the UAOC would come to the unification council at the invitation of the Ecumenical Patriarch. He also responded to the UOC-KP's previous decisions by saying: "How can the council be the Council of Bishops, if one priest and one layman with a bishop are invited?"

On 12 December, in an interview given to the BBC, Zorya said that if the UOC-KP took part in the unification council, it "[would] really get something bigger and better than now". He added that if the UOC-KP did not take part in the unification council their situation would worsen and their parishes would leave the UOC-KP. He explained: "If we want to achieve success, we must deal with the real situation, rather than the ideal one, which we'd like to have."

==== Acceptation of Constantinople's terms ====
On 13 December, as planned on 6 December, all bishops of the UOC-KP held a council chaired by Filaret. This council of the UOC-KP decided that the UOC-KP would participate in the unification council and allow representatives of the clergy, laity and monks to vote, according to the directives of the Ecumenical Patriarch. Press secretary of the UOC-KP, Zorya, declared the same day in an interview to BBC Ukraine that, during said council, the UOC-KP had elected its only candidate for the unification council but that his identity was secret, and that the tomos would be given on 6 January 2019 by the Ecumenical Patriarch to the elected primate of the new united Ukrainian church. He also added that each of the UOC-KP bishops are expected to bring one priest and one monk or layman to the unification council, and that the vote during the unification council would be secret.

=== Beginning of the unification council ===
On 12 December, Metropolitan Emmanuel of France of the Ecumenical Patriarchate arrived in Kyiv to prepare the unification council. A letter of invitation to the unification council had been sent to every bishop of the UOC-KP, of the UAOC, and of the UOC-MP. As of 13 December, out of the 97 bishops of the UOC-MP, 56 had returned the invitation for the unification council they had received.

On 14 December, Makariy, head of the UAOC, declared in an interview to Radio Liberty that at the demand of the Ecumenical Patriarch he (Makariy) would not run for the post of head of the new united Ukrainian church. Makariy added that he believed the Ecumenical Patriarch had demanded the same thing to Filaret, head of the UOC-KP. On the same day, Metropolitan Alexander (Drabinko) and Metropolitan Simeon, both of the UOC-MP, received a letter from the Ecumenical Patriarchate which absolved them of any sanction imposed by any church.

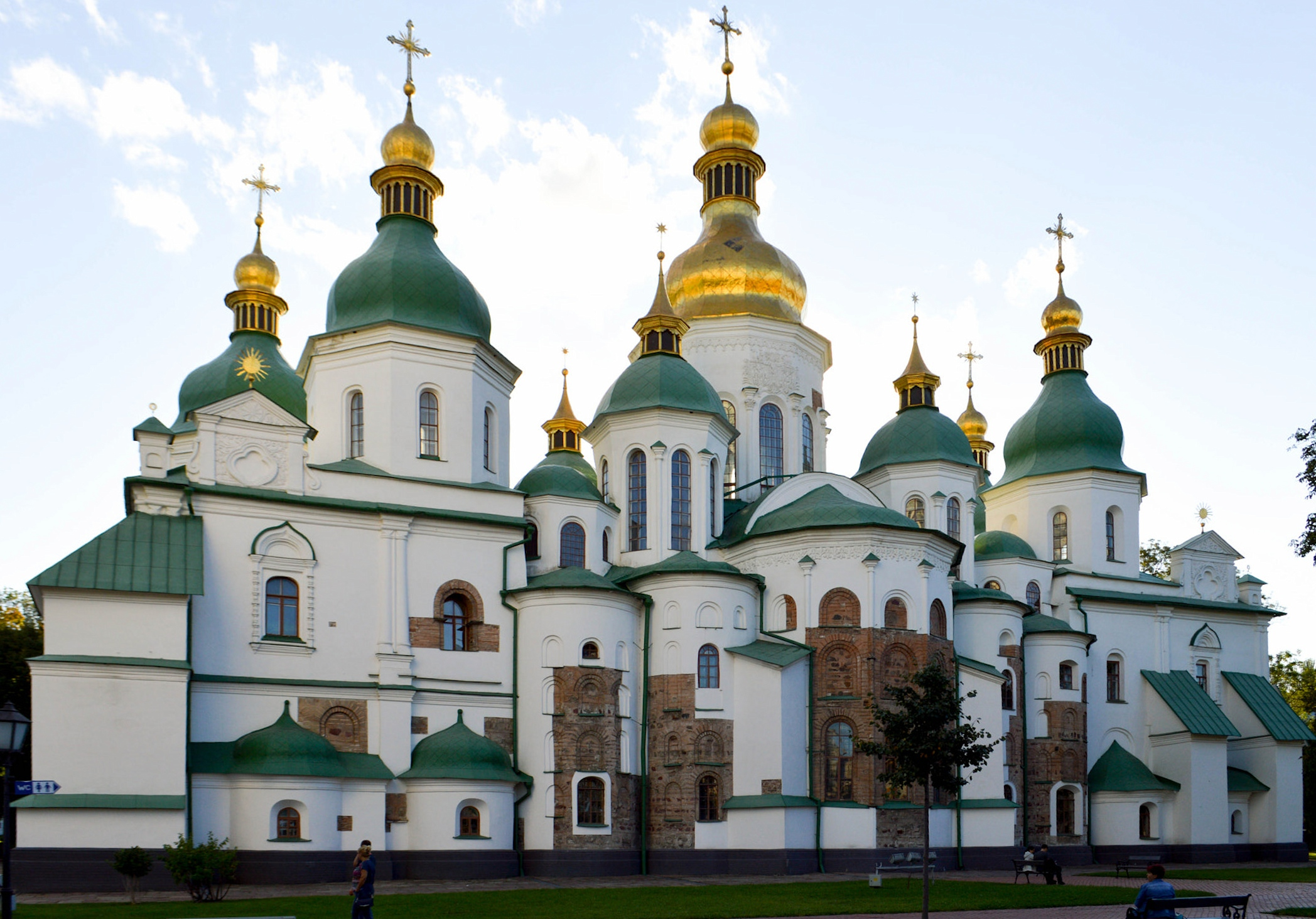
Saint Sophia's Cathedral, in Kyiv, where the unification council took place

On 15 December, the unification council took place at St. Sophia's Cathedral in Kyiv, with thousands people waiting outside the cathedral, in the St Sofia Square. The same day, the Ukrainian website Pravda published online the alleged project of charter of the united Ukrainian church, however this version was the one the Ecumenical Patriarchate had drafted during its 29 November 2018 synod and did not contain the additions which had been made thereafter at the request of the UAOC and the UOC-KP. During the council, the Ukrainian President Poroshenko made a speech to the participants of the unification council. At the council, Filaret appeared with the headgear of a Metropolitan and indicated he recognized the Ecumenical Patriarch's authority over the new church which would be created. Filaret later added that he had not put his patriarchal headgear at the request of Metropolitan Emmanuel of France who chaired the council. Metropolitan Emmanuel justified his demand by "explaining in such a way" that Filaret was "not a patriarch for them [the Ecumenical Patriarchate]." Filaret added: "And since the Council was under [Metropolitan Emmanuel's] leadership, they explained that there could not be a patriarch at the Council". Filaret added all the bishops at the council acted as bishops of the Ecumenical Patriarchate.

According to Orthodoxie.com, President Poroshenko had promised Patriarch Bartholomew the participation of 10-15 bishops of the UOC-MP at the council, but only two members of the UOC-MP took part in it: Metropolitan Simeon of Vinnitsa and Bar and Metropolitan-vicar Alexander (Drabinko). The ROC had called its bishops to boycott the unification council. According to Archimandrite Cyrill Govorun of the UOC-MP, in spring 2018 ten hierarchs of the UOC-MP supported the idea of an autocephalous Ukrainian church. According to the exarch of the Ecumenical Patriarchate in Ukraine, Daniel of Pamphilon, during his four months as exarchs in Ukraine he met 18 hierarchs of the UOC-MP and all of them were ready to join a local Ukrainian church.

=== Dissolution of the UOC-KP and the UAOC ===
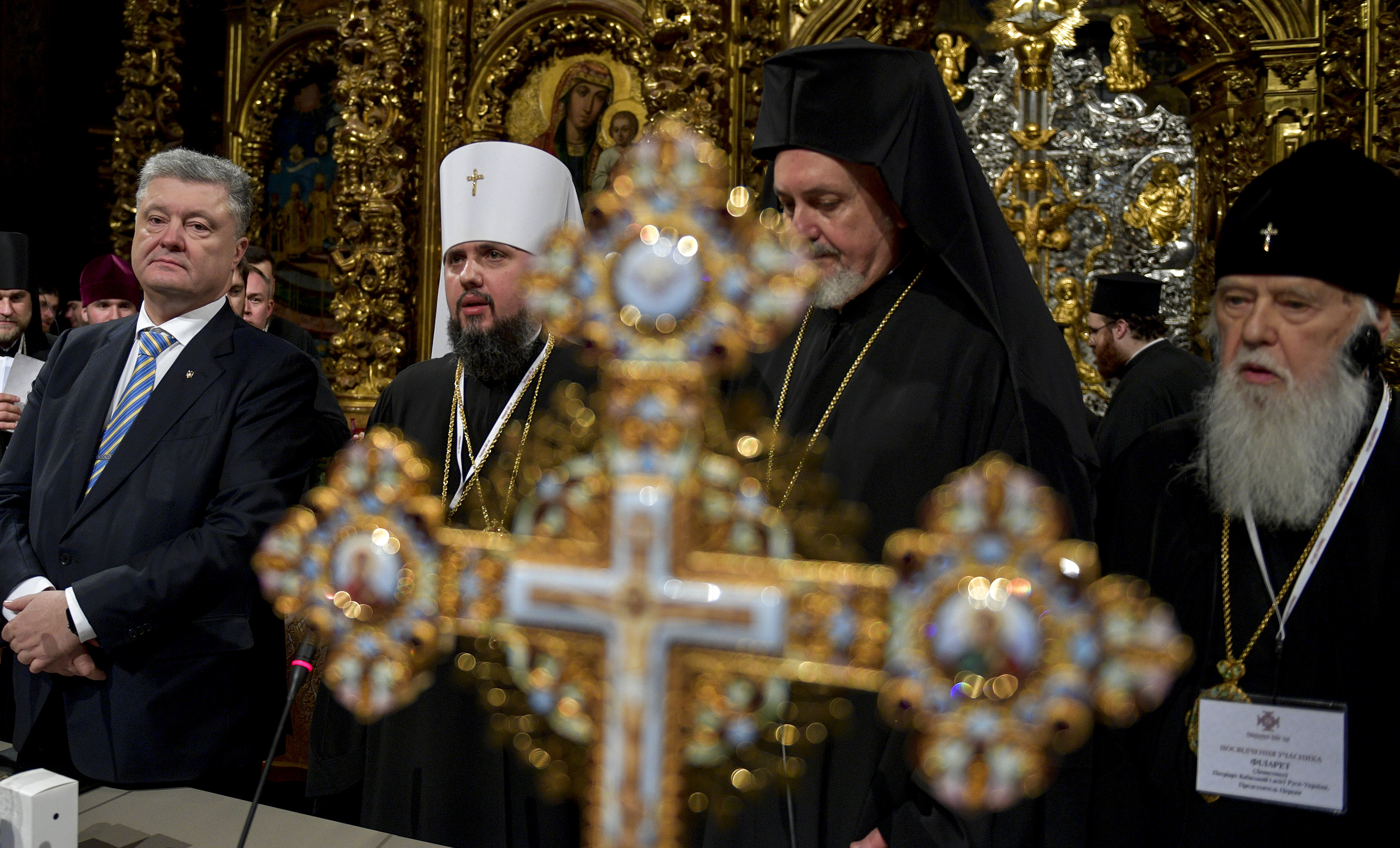
Inside the cathedral during the unification council. In order from left to right: Petro Poroshenko, Epiphanius, Emmanuel, Filaret

On 15 December, before the unification council started, the UOC-KP and the UAOC held separate meetings during which they both dissolved themselves, which delayed the beginning of the unification council.

Orthodoxie.com gives the following description of the events of the unification council: the council started three hours late because 10-12 bishops of the UOC-MP had been brought to Kyiv by the SBU and forced to sign letters containing their vote for Metropolitan Simeon; however, when Met. Simeon presented the letters to the representatives of the Ecumenical Patriarchate at the council, the representatives demanded that those bishops be presents in person at the council to vote, which caused a three-hour delay. The council then started. The Ecumenical Patriarchate demanded that Metropolitan Simeon be elected by the council, and asked President Poroshenko to make pressure on the voters in order for Met. Simeon to be elected, which Poroshenko did. However, members of the UOC-KP had their own candidate who was faithful to Filaret, which caused another delay.

Archimandrite and doctor in theology Cyrill Hovorun of the UOC-MP said two bishops of the UOC-MP were present, Simeon and Oleksandr, and that those bishops "brought with them written requests which delegated to them the right to vote on behalf of other bishops who were not present. There was a discussion at the Council whether it was possible to accept these votes in absentia, and it was decided that it was impossible. Those votes were not counted."

On 18 December, metropolitan Mykhayil (Zinkevych), of the now dissolved UOC-KP, declared in a press conference that he had been forced by Filaret to withdraw his candidacy from the unification council. According to Mykhail, Filaret said that if the UOC-KP was to nominate two candidate, both of those candidates might lose the election at the unification council. Filaret therefore threatened that if Mykhail did not withdrew his candidacy before going to the unification council, Filaret would not sign the paper of the dissolution of the UOC-KP and Filaret would not go to the unification council. In the end, Mykhail withdrew his candidacy as he perceived this decision was the best for the OCU. On 16 December, a similar account had been given by a member of the diocese of Mykhail, deputy Mykola Buliga, who participated in the unification council as a laity. According to Buliga, it is this disagreement between Filaret and Mykhail which made the council start more than three hours late. Moreover, Buliga claims that President Poroshenko was pressured by Filaret to support Epiphany during the council, and Poroshenko pressured the voters in order for them to vote for Epiphany. Buliga indicated that Mykhail was the favorite and that even after the withdrawal of his candidacy, Mykhail still got 30 votes.

Mikhayl's withdrawal of candidacy was allegedly done after an intervention by Filaret. According to BBC Ukraine, Metropolitan Mykhail of Lutsk and Volyn withdrew his candidacy during the council before the final vote, which allowed Epiphany to win against Metropolitan Simeon by 20 votes.

Filaret later denied Mykhail was blackmailed to withdraw his candidacy, saying Mykhail was only "persuaded" to withdraw his candidacy "[i]n order to maintain unity". He also explained in an interview that "the enemy forces simply took advantage of his [Mykhail] desire to be the head of the Ukrainian Church. If it were not for the forces that supported him, he would not have nominated his candidacy."

=== Vote ===
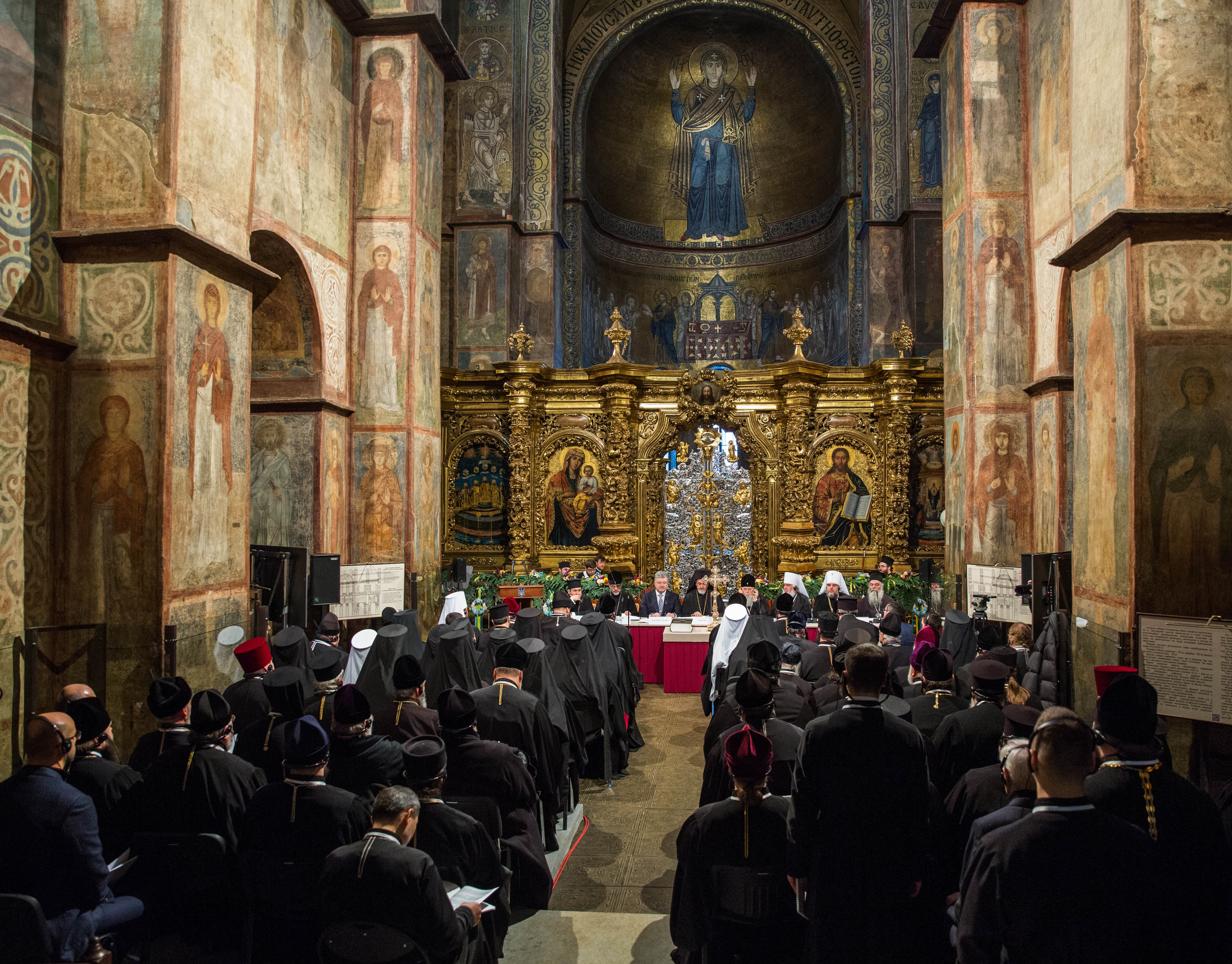
Inside the cathedral during the unification council

There were 192 or 200 voters in total. 42 of them were bishops of the UOC-KP, 12 were bishops of the UAOC and at least 2 were bishops of the UOC-MP; how many bishops of the UOC-MP participated remains unclear, 10 bishops of the UOC-MP were planned to participate. Every bishop was to bring two people to vote; the UOC-KP's total of electors was planned to be 126, the UAOC's total of electors was planned to be 36 delegates, and the UOC-MP's total of electors was planned to be 30.

In the second round, laity and priests did not vote, only bishops.

According to Interfax, some of the UOC-KP bishops had their own candidate for the council: Metropolitan Mykhail (Zinkevich) of Lutsk and Volyn who would be candidate for the unification council. According to Unian, said Mykhail was supported by a minority of bishops of the UOC-KP.

According to religious expert Alexander Sagan, the vote went as follow. Mykhail, Epiphanius and Simeon were the three candidates at the post of head of the OCU. In the first round, the score of the three candidates was: Mykhail: 38; Simeon: 56; Epiphany: 81. Allegedly, at the end, Mikhail dismissed his candidacy. According to Sagan, the votes of bishops were as follows: Simeon: 28; Epiphany: 36. Still according to Sagan, the vote was secret during both rounds. According to Orthodoxia.info, Mykhail supporters' votes went to Epiphany after Mykhail withdrew his candidacy.

According to archbishop Eustratius (Zorya) who was part of the UOC-KP, the charter of the united church was adopted with an overwhelming majority (only one voter was against).

== Election of Metropolitan Epiphanius ==
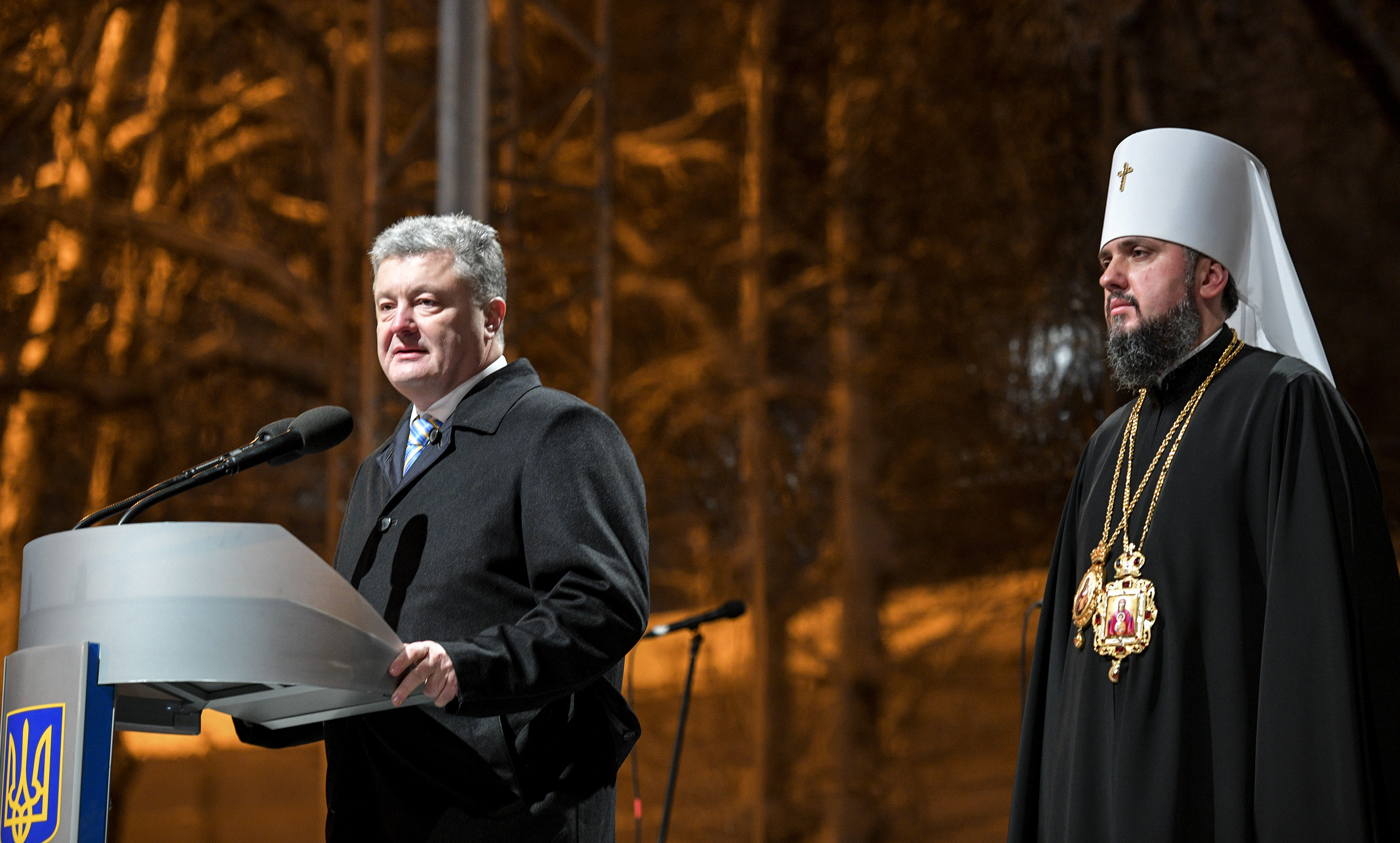
Metropolitan Epiphanius and Ukrainian President Poroshenko, right after the unification council

Metropolitan Epiphanius of the UOC-KP, who had been chosen on 13 December by the UOC-KP as its only candidate, and was considered Filaret's right arm and protégé, was elected Metropolitan of Kyiv and all Ukraine by the unification council on 15 December 2018 after the second round of voting. In his speech to the faithfuls after the election, Metropolitan Epiphany thanked President Poroshenko as well as Filaret, and said Filaret was "the spiritual father of all Ukrainians" and "will continue to be an active life-long [mentor], helping us to jointly build our united local Ukrainian Orthodox church". Epiphany also said no weighty decision would be taken by his church as long as he had not received the church's tomos. The unification council also adopted a charter for the newly formed church.

The Ecumenical Patriarch congratulated and blessed the newly elected Metropolitan on the day of his election and said the newly elected primate was invited to come to Istanbul to concelebrate a liturgy with the Ecumenical Patriarch and receive the Orthodox Church of Ukraine's tomos on 6 January 2019. On the next day after the election of Epiphany, a Sunday, the Ecumenical Patriarch commemorated him during a liturgy, along with the other primates of the other Orthodox churches.

After the council, Filaret became the "honorary patriarch" of the Orthodox Church of Ukraine and will serve in the St Volodymyr's Cathedral. On 16 December 2018, during a liturgy in which he came wearing the headgear of a patriarch, during his sermon, Filaret declared he was still patriarch: "The Patriarch remains for life and, together with the Primate, governs the Ukrainian Orthodox Church". After the liturgy, he was acclaimed by the hierarchs of the church as "great vladyka and father Filaret, the holiest patriarch of Kyiv and all Ukraine-Rus and sacred archimandrite of the Holy Dormition Kyiv-Pechersk Lavra". On 22 December 2018, Filaret declared that if he had run for the role of primate of the OCU, Ukraine would never have got a tomos. On 20 January 2019, Filaret declared concerning Epiphanius: "I supported him and fought for his candidacy, because among all the young bishops I see him as the most worthy to be the primate of the Ukrainian Orthodox Church."

Concerning his election, Metropolitan Epiphanius later declared: "I always relied on the will of God. In 2013, I introduced my candidacy to the post of patriarchal governor, and the Bishops' synod appointed me. In the event of the death of the patriarch, the governor became a locum tenens. On his shoulder was the responsibility of the church and the election of a new primate. Since that time, among the bishops and the clergy, the idea that I can be a candidate for the head of the Local Church was confirmed. I did not want this. There are many older hierarchs who have more experience. But so, the Lord blessed me to choose my candidacy. For me it's a heavy cross. But we live in historical time."

== Conflict between Filaret and Epiphanius ==
Filaret later explained in an appeal the conditions of the council. According to Filaret, the agreement reached at the unification council was as follow: "the primate is responsible for the external representation of the Ukrainian Orthodox Church (UOC), and the patriarch is responsible for the internal church life in Ukraine, but in cooperation with the primate. The primate shall do nothing in the church without the consent of the patriarch. The patriarch chairs the meetings of the Holy Synod and the UOC meetings for the sake of preserving unity, its growth, and affirmation." Filaret considers this agreement has not been fulfilled.

Filaret also said he was asked by the Ecumenical Patriarch not to put forward his (Filaret) candidacy at the council, and that Metropolitan Emmanuel of France asked him not to wear the koukoulion; Filaret was also asked to nominate any bishop for the post of primate; Filaret agreed to those demands and said he chose "humiliation" in order for the church to get the tomos. Filaret also said that giving up the status of patriarchate was a demand of the Ecumenical Patriarchate in order for the Ecumenical Patriarchate to grant a tomos to a Metropolis which was part of the Ecumenical Patriarchate. Filaret said that therefore "giving up on the status of patriarchy was purely situational. Only the Local Council of the church, which created the Kyiv Patriarchate, may cancel the decision to establish the Kyiv Patriarchate. No such council has been convened. This means the Kyiv Patriarchate remains in place and continues to operate, especially since it is registered with state bodies." He justified himself saying that during the 15 December 2018 unification council, they "gave up on the status of Patriarchate" but that the council "was not a council of the Ukrainian Autocephalous Church, but the one of the Kyiv Metropolis of the Patriarchate of Constantinople".

On 14 August 2019, the UAOC legally ceased to exist because its legal entity merged with the legal entity of the OCU.

On 14 December 2019, after the meeting of the enlarged Bishops' Council, held on December 14 in Kyiv on the occasion of the anniversary of the creation of the OCU, Epiphanius declared that the procedure of liquidation of the UAOC as well as the UOC-KP had been completed the day before. He added: "Such structures no longer exist. In confirmation of that, in the State Register there is marked 'activity DISCONTINUED'".

== See also ==
- Granting of autocephaly to the Orthodox Church of Ukraine
- 2018 Moscow–Constantinople schism
- Orthodox Church of Ukraine
- Epiphanius of Kyiv
- History of Christianity in Ukraine
