= Stauropegion of the Ecumenical Patriarchate in Ukraine =

Stauropegion of the Ecumenical Patriarchate in Ukraine Greek: Σταυροπήγιο του Οικουμενικού Πατριαρχείου στην Ουκρανία
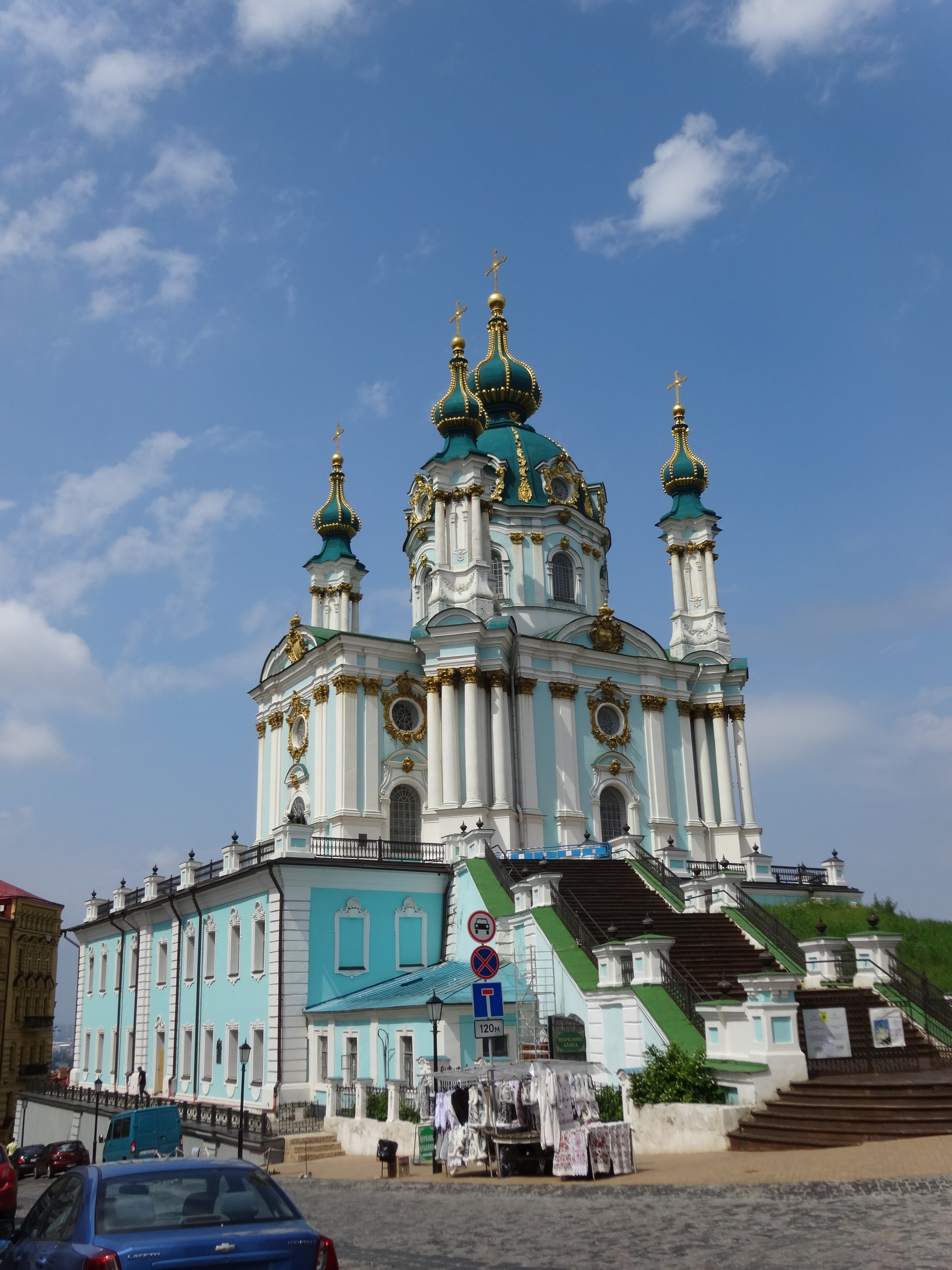
- Stauropegion is located in St. Andrew's Church in Kyiv

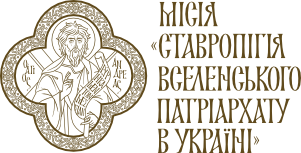
- Coat of arms

Location
- Country: Ukraine
- Territory: Kyiv
- Headquarters: Fener, Istanbul

Statistics
- Parishes: 1
- Churches: 1

Information
- Denomination: Eastern Orthodox
- Rite: Byzantine Rite
- Established: 1592 (founded); October 11, 2018 (restored)
- Dissolved: 1686
- Cathedral: St. Andrew's Church
- Language: Ukrainian, Koine Greek, English, Church Slavonic
- Calendar: Julian calendar, Revised Julian calendar

Leadership
- Governance: Stauropegion under the direct authority of the throne of Constantinople
- Bishop: Michael, Titular Bishop of Koman, Exarch of the Ecumenical Patriarch in Kyiv

The Mission «Stauropegion of the Ecumenical Patriarchate in Ukraine» (Greek: «Σταυροπήγιο του Οικουμενικού Πατριαρχείου στην Ουκρανία», romanized: Apostoli «Stavropigia tou Oikoumenikou Patriarcheiou stin Oukrania»; Ukrainian: Місія «Ставропігія Вселенського патріархату в Україні», romanized: Misiia «Stavropihiia Vselenskoho patriarkhatu v Ukrayini») is a permanent representative office of the Ecumenical Patriarchate of Constantinople as the mother church for the local autocephalous Orthodox Church of Ukraine, which is located in St. Andrew's Church, Kyiv.

== History ==
From 1592 to 1686 the monastery Kyiv Pechersk Lavra was the stauropegion of the Ecumenical Patriarch of Constantinople.

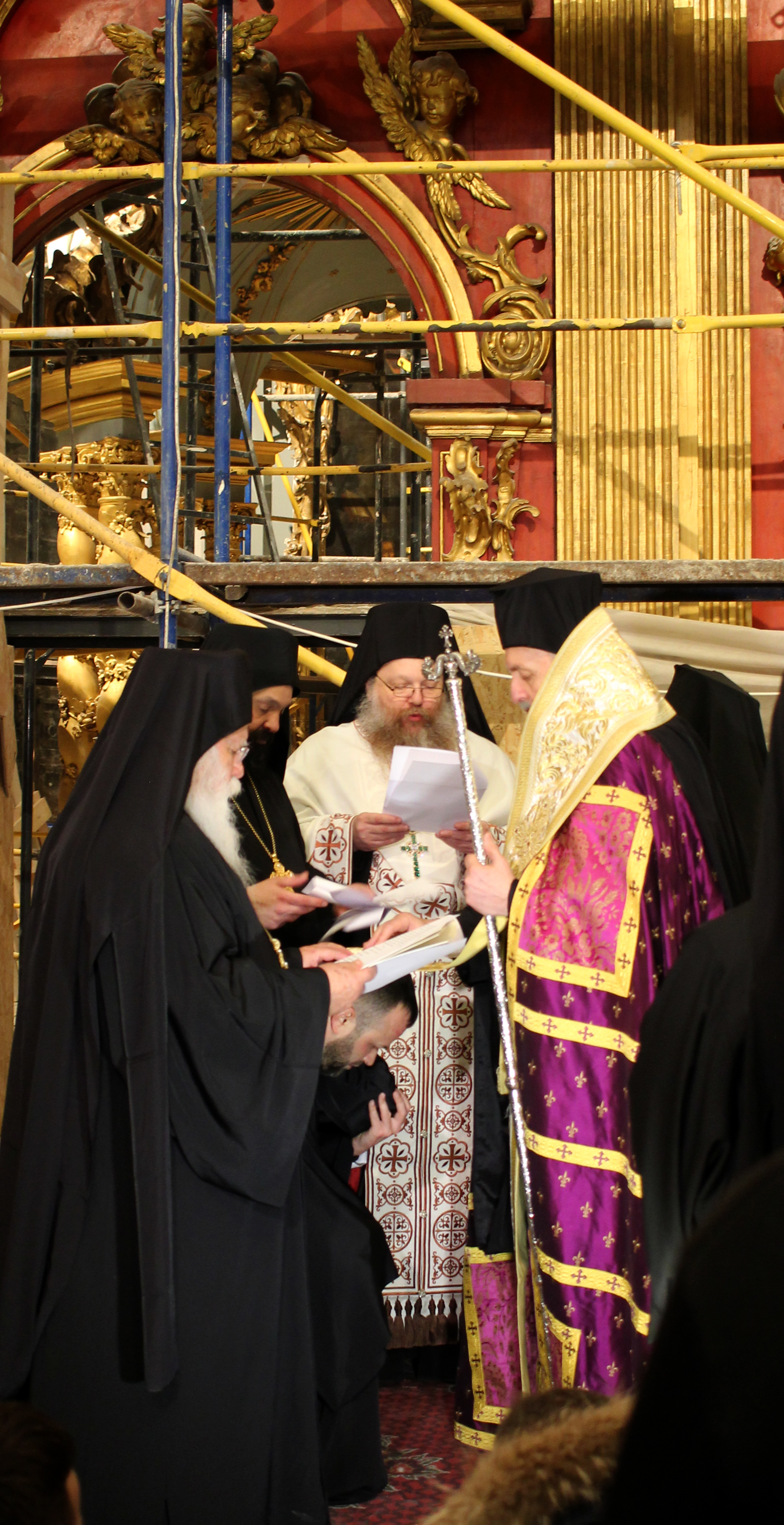
Ordination of Archimandrite Michael to Exarch of the Ecumenical Patriarchate in Kyiv (February 2, 2019)

It was restored in October 2018, based on the abolition of the charter of 1686 granting permission to the Moscow Patriarch to perform the ordination of Metropolitans of Kyiv due to which the annexation of the Metropolitanate of Kyiv of the Ecumenical Patriarchate of Constantinople by Moscow Patriarchate took place.

On January 9, 2019, the Holy Synod of the Ecumenical Patriarchate of Constantinople appointed Archimandrite (since November 8, 2020 – Bishop of Koman) Mykhailo (Anishchenko) head of Stauropegion in Kyiv.

On February 2, 2019, Archimandrite Michael (Anishchenko) was ordained Exarch of the Ecumenical Patriarchate in Kyiv at St. Andrew's Church, headed by Metropolitan Emmanuel of Gaul (Adamakis) with the help of Greek hierarchs.

On December 13, 2020, a solemn Liturgy was held in St. Andrew's Church on the occasion of the opening of the church.

On January 27, 2023, in the Stavropegy of the Ecumenical Patriarchate in Kyiv, the first liturgical gospel-aprakos translated into Ukrainian from Greek, published with the help of the UOC of USA, was presented.

== Canonical status ==
The decision to restore its Stauropegion in Kyiv was made by the Synod of the Constantinople Orthodox Church chaired by Patriarch Bartholomew I on October 11, 2018. Stauropegion exists on a permanent basis and is a kind of "church embassy" like the Vatican nunciature.

Stauropegion (Greek: Σταυροπήγιο – from «εμπηγνύω έναν Σταυρό», romanized: Staeropeyio — «empeynyo enan Staero») means "to drive [into the ground] (or establish) the Cross". Chronologically, the term refers to the era of Justinian, or even earlier. The cross was given by the Patriarch (Ecumenical of Constantinople) or the Holy Synod of a certain Autocephalous Church, for placement in the place of foundation of monasteries. This fact was evidence that the building to be erected on this site is under their direct subordination (Patriarch or Synod). Stauropegic monasteries do not fall under the authority of the local bishop, but are directly dependent on the Holy Synod of the local Autocephalous Church, or Ecumenical Patriarch. The Ecumenical Patriarch exercises his power, usually through his representative (Exarch). At the same time, the local bishop does not interfere in the management of the monastery, does not visit it as a manager, and is present during the vows of monks only at the invitation of the abbot of the monastery.

The Exarch (Greek: Ο Έξαρχος, ο «εκ της αρχής», romanized: O Exarchos, o «ek tes arches») is a representative of the Patriarch and his personal envoy, who carries out ordinary pastoral activities in Stauropegic monasteries or churches.

== Location ==
On October 18, 2018, the Verkhovna Rada passed the law "On the peculiarities of the use of St. Andrew's Church of the National Reserve "Sophia of Kyiv", according to which St. Andrew's Church was transferred to permanent and free use by the Ecumenical Patriarchate.

== Worship ==
During the restoration of the main church, regular services were held in the stylobate building of St. Andrew's Church. At the end of July 2021, Stauropegion received permission to worship in the main church.

In the main church of St. Andrew's Church services are held according to the Julian calendar, and in the lower church of St. Andrew's Church, the chapel in honor of the Holy Apostle Bartholomew (stylobate part), according to the Revised Julian calendar.

== Exarchs of Stauropegion ==
- Titular Bishop of Koman Michael (Anishchenko) since January 11, 2019.
