= Annexation of the Metropolis of Kyiv by the Moscow Patriarchate =

1685–1722 transfer of ecclesiastical jurisdiction from Constantinople to Moscow

- Date: approx. 1685–1722
- Type: Transfer
- Cause: 1. Ordination of Metropolitan Gedeon of Kiev by Patriarch Joachim of Moscow in Moscow; 2. Act of the Ecumenical Patriarchate of Constantinople of 1686, which gave the right to ordain the Metropolitan of Kiev to the Patriarch of Moscow
- Participants: 1. Ecumenical Patriarchate; 2. Metropolis of Kyiv of the Ecumenical Patriarchate; 3. Patriarchate of Moscow
- Outcome: Absorption of the Metropolis of Kiev in 1722 by Tsar Peter I

The Annexation of the Metropolitanate of Kyiv by the Moscow Patriarchate was the transference of the Metropolis of Kiev, Galicia and all Rus' in the Eastern Orthodox from the ecclesiastical jurisdiction of the Ecumenical Patriarchate of Constantinople to the Patriarchate of Moscow. The metropolis lay in the territory of the Cossack Hetmanate and of the Polish–Lithuanian Commonwealth.

From 1649, the Tsardom of Russia began to absorb the Hetmanate, gradually eliminating Ukrainian political and social institutions. The process culminated in the declaration of the Russian Empire in 1721. As part of this cultural absorption, the Ottoman Empire was enlisted to pressure the Patriarch of Constantinople to transfer the governance of the metropolis to Moscow's canonical jurisdiction in 1686.

It is a matter of dispute whether this de facto transfer was also achieved de jure or canonically. The process began in 1685 with the ordination of Gedeon Chetvertinsky to the Metropolis of Kiev by Patriarch Joachim of Moscow and ended in 1722 when Tsar Peter the Great appointed Barlaam (Voniatovych) with the rank of archbishop, not metropolitan. Since that date, the metropolis has become an ordinary diocese of the Russian Orthodox Church (ROC). According to the ROC, the 1686 Synodal Letter of the Ecumenical Patriarch gave Moscow the right to ordain the Metropolitan of Kiev. According to the Ecumenical Patriarchate, this act was firstly conditional upon Moscow preserving the traditional rights of the metropolitan and secondly did not affect the authority of Constantinople as the mother church of the metropolis. In this respect, both Constantinople and the current Orthodox Church of Ukraine (OCU) regard Moscow's subsequent actions as uncanonical. On 11 October 2018, the Holy Synod of the Ecumenical Patriarchate revoked the Synodal Letter (Act) of 1686.

== Background ==
The Moscow Church had existed for more than two centuries as a self-proclaimed, autocephalic church body. In 1589, the church's position was regularised when it was raised to the status of a patriarchate by the Ecumenical Patriarch, Jeremias II of Constantinople. The Metropolis of Kiev, Galicia and all Rus' continued to remain autonomous within the Patriarchate of Constantinople, although after the fall of the Byzantine Empire in 1453, the degree of ecclesiastical dependence of Kiev on Constantinople had become less important. This gave Ukrainian historians reason to say:

The Ukrainian Church was only nominally dependent on the Ecumenical Patriarchate of Constantinople, but in fact it was independent.

== Interventions by Moscow in the metropolis ==
=== Election of the abbot of the Kyiv Pechersk Lavra ===
The first serious ecclesiastical step towards the absorption of the metropolis by the Moscow Patriarchate was made in 1683. The archimandrite of the Kyiv Pechersk Lavra — Innocent Giesel — died on 18 November. Hetman Ivan Samoilovych wrote a letter about this to Patriarch Joachim of Moscow, asking for a blessing on the election of a new abbot. In a corresponding letter, the patriarch thanked the hetman for addressing him and gave his blessing for the election.

The hetman's behaviour in this regard was not supported by the Kiev clergy. An archimandrite — Barlaam Yasynskyi — was elected by free vote without prior consultation with Samoilovich. Without asking for confirmation of his rights in Moscow, Barlaam turned for initiation to Lazar Baranovych, who refused to confirm his election. However, the threat of seizure of the lavra's possessions, which came from the Lviv bishop Joseph Shumlyanskyi, forced Barlaam to ask for confirmation of his authority from Patriarch Joachim. As a result, the patriarch sent Barlaam a letter of approval, which, however, spoke more about the duties of the Archimandrite of Pechersk than about his ancient privileges. From a canonical point of view, this action of Patriarch Joachim meant the removal of the Lavra from the jurisdiction of the Ecumenical Patriarch of Constantinople. It should be borne in mind that this was a Stauropegial monastery, directly subordinate to the Primate of the Ecumenical Patriarchate of Constantinople.

The intensification of Bishop Joseph of Lviv Shumlyansky, who began to call himself the administrator of the Metropolitanate of Kyiv, prompted both the hetman and the Moscow government to intensify their efforts to replace the vacant metropolitan throne. Bishop Joseph, who was in the Polish-Lithuanian Commonwealth, was in solidarity with the King of the Polish-Lithuanian Commonwealth in his anti-Moscow plans, and there were rumors that he was ready to accept Catholicism, which further increased fear on the Left Bank. Therefore, in his letter to Hetman Samoilovych dated 31 October 1684, Patriarch Joachim motivated the need to replace the vacant Kyiv cathedra as soon as possible as follows:

... in the Polish state, Uniates, people of their spiritual rank, are called Kyivan metropolitans and Pechersk archimandrites to appropriate that Metropolitanate of Kyiv.

=== Search for a candidate for the throne of Kyiv ===
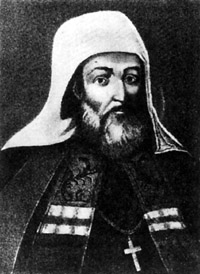
Gedeon Sviatopolk-Chetvertynskyi

All this prompted the hetman to look for a candidate for the throne of Kyiv. And here came a convenient case. In 1684, Bishop Gedeon Sviatopolk of Lutsk and Ostroh, Prince Chetvertynsky, fled from the Polish-Lithuanian Commonwealth to the Moscow-controlled part of Ukraine. Explaining the reason for his escape from the Polish-Lithuanian Commonwealth, he thanked the Omelian Ukraintsev:

I came here because I had no life from the persecution of the royal, everyone forced me to accept the Roman faith or become a Uniate, and now, going on a campaign, the king and queen themselves told me that when the king comes from the war and I am a Roman or if I do not become a Uniate, I will definitely be sent to Marienburg for life. I was frightened and fled here, wanting to end my life in piety.

The majority of the Ukrainian clergy, the hetman, and the Moscow government began to regard Gedeon as the most suitable candidate for metropolitan. Only Lazar Baranovych, who apparently claimed the Metropolitanate of Kyiv himself, did not support his candidacy. After Omelian Ukraintsev met with Gedeon in November 1684 and found him quite fit to occupy the throne of Kyiv, Hetman Samoilovich offered to send him immediately to be delivered to Moscow. However, Ukraintsev advised the hetman not to do so, so as not to provoke a conflict with the Archbishop of Chernihiv:

If the Archbishop of Chernihiv hated the Bishop of Lutsk, you, the Hetman, would not let him, the Bishop of Lutsk, go to Moscow at once, but first let the clergy and laity elect the Metropolitan to Kyiv.

It was this plan, proposed by Omelian Ukraintsev, that was implemented.

=== First attempt to obtain consent ===
Prior to the Council in Kyiv to elect a new metropolitan, the Moscow government tried to obtain the consent of the Ecumenical Patriarch of Constantinople for the transfer of the Metropolitanate of Kyiv to the jurisdiction of the Moscow Patriarch. The Greek Zacharias Sophir was sent to Constantinople for negotiations. He took with him a letter from the Moscovian Tsar Ivan V and Peter the Great addressed to Patriarch Jacob, dated 11 December 1684. It contained a request to cede to the Moscow Patriarch the right to ordain Metropolitans of Kyiv. However, the patriarch replied that now in the Ottoman Empire is a troubled time: the vizier at death, and it is unknown who will be in his place, and therefore nothing can be done. So Moscow's request remained unsatisfied. After that, the Moscow government and Hetman Samoilovych decided to act without waiting for a blessing from Constantinople.

=== Election of Gedeon as Metropolitan ===
The Council for the Election of a New Metropolitan was convened in Kyiv on 8 July 1685, in the Cathedral of St. Sophia. The composition of its participants quite clearly reflected the real state of affairs in the metropolis. Lazar Baranovych did not appear at the council, "responded to the weakness of his health." Moreover, the Archbishop of Chernihiv did not even send his proxies to Kyiv. As Hetman Samoilovich wrote to Moscow, there was "no one from the Chernihiv diocese at the Council, both archimandrites and abbots, and archpriests." There were no delegates from the dioceses that remained in the territory of the Polish–Lithuanian Commonwealth in Kyiv. So in the church of St. Sophia were present only representatives of the clergy of the Kyiv diocese — "all of the Kyiv diocese from the spiritual rank of the primordial." At the same time, the number of secular ranks sent to the council by the Hetman was quite significant. Chernihiv Colonel Vasyl Borkovskyi, military osavul Ivan Mazepa, Pereiaslav Colonel Leontii Polubotok, Kyiv Colonel Hryhoriy Karpov and Nizhyn Colonel Yakiv Zhurakivskyi were present at the St. Sophia Church. Thus, the representatives of the clergy at the council were "much less" than the envoys of the hetman.

After the beginning of the council meetings, it became clear that the clergy was not at all burning with the desire to "leave the former obedience to the throne of Constantinople, because of which many are confused." However, despite opposition from the clergy, at the insistence of Hetman Samoilovich, the Council still elected Gedeon Sviatopolk-Chetvertynskyi to the throne of Kyiv.

It is noteworthy that Bishop Gedeon himself did not take part in the work of the council. Already after the election, a delegation consisting of Abbots Theodosius (Uhlytskyi) and Jerome (Dubyna) was sent to him, who informed him of the election results.

==== Protest of the Kyiv clergy ====
Not surprisingly, the Kyiv clergy decided to protest the actions of the council. It is sometimes thought that the dissatisfied convened a new Council in Kyiv, which sent its protest to Hetman Samoilovich. However, the text of this protest does not give reason to believe that an alternative Council was convened in Kyiv. Most likely, the protest was made by representatives of the clergy, who met in St. Sophia on July 8. The content of this document allows us to conclude that, in fact, caused concern to the Ukrainian clergy.

First of all, the protesters believed that the Council on July 8 had no right to decide on the transition to another canonical jurisdiction. In their opinion, this issue should be resolved between two patriarchs – Constantinople and Moscow. The rejection of the metropolitanate from Constantinople may also adversely affect the lives of those dioceses that remained in the territory of the Commonwealth. The transition to Moscow's jurisdiction could be a reason to intensify Greek Catholic propaganda in the Polish-Lithuanian Commonwealth. However, the greatest fears of the Ukrainian clergy were caused by the prospect of the Kyiv metropolitans losing the privileges they had before. The protest explicitly states that if Moscow is subordinated to Moscow, there will be no more free elections of the metropolitan, "but whoever is sent from the patriarch will be the metropolitan." The protesters also feared that the Moscow patriarch would from now on interfere in the church affairs of the Kyiv metropolitan. They confirmed their fears by referring to the events that took place in Sloboda Ukraine after the opening of the Belgorod metropolitanate.

Sloboda Ukraine covered the present Kharkiv, part of Sumy, Donetsk and Luhansk regions of Ukraine and part of Belgorod, Kursk and Voronezh regions of Russia. During the war of Bohdan Khmelnytsky there was a mass settlement of these lands by Ukrainian Cossacks and peasants. The settlers swore allegiance to the Moscow tsar, for which they received special liberties from him. In ecclesiastical terms, the territory of Sloboda Ukraine was subordinated to the Moscow Patriarch. From 1657 to 1667 these lands were directly part of the Patriarchal region. But at the Moscow Cathedral in 1667 the Belgorod metropolitanate was founded, which included a large part of Sloboda Ukraine. The first Metropolitan of Belgorod was the Serb Theodosius. Later, bishops from Great Russia were appointed to Belgorod, who actively introduced the Moscow order here.

In this protest, the Kyiv clergy lists the following changes that took place in the church life of Slobozhanshchyna:

- Church tribute was no longer levied on the number of churches, but on the number of yards in each parish, for which all members of the parishes were carefully rewritten.
- The priest was subjected to corporal punishment for concealing income, as well as for other, lesser offenses.
- The laity were also subject to new taxes: «who will drown, whom will be struck by thunder, or will die abruptly by death — the metropolitan is paid for it on hryvnia».
- Church books of the Kyiv press were replaced by Moscow ones, Kyiv church singing was also abolished, and Moscow church singing was introduced.
- Priests were required to baptize children not because of dousing, but only because of immersion, so many unusual priests "drowned children in the suburbs."
- In churches, the former antimins were removed from the thrones and replaced with new ones, signed by the Moscow Patriarch.
- Former proteges and tonsure were confiscated from the clergy, and "Moscow's new ones were issued instead, but not at the expense of priests.".

The Kyiv clergy feared that all these innovations would be introduced in Kyiv by the same methods if their metropolitanate became part of the Moscow Patriarchate.

Hetman Ivan Samoilovych, informing the patriarch and the great sovereigns that the election of the metropolitan had taken place, asked that the Kyiv archpastor retain his former privileges. He asked to keep the procedure for electing the metropolitan by free votes, so that the Moscow patriarch would only ordain the metropolitan of Kyiv, but would not interfere in his affairs. Hetman asked to allow the Kyiv metropolitanate to have its own printing house and schools. He also considered it necessary for Patriarch Joachim to ask Constantinople to bless the transfer of the Kyiv metropolitanate to a new jurisdiction. At the same time, Samoilovich considered it expedient to retain the title of "Exarch of the Ecumenical Patriarchate of Constantinople" for the Metropolitan of Kyiv.

==== Approval of Metropolitan Gedeon ====
Patriarch Joachim approved the Kyiv elections. In September, he sent a letter to Bishop Gedeon, congratulating him on his election and inviting him to come to Moscow. A letter of similar content was sent to Hetman Samoilovych. Interestingly, in these letters the question of preserving the ancient privileges of the Kyiv cathedra was bypassed by silence. The great Moscow rulers also sent a letter to the hetman, who, unlike Patriarch Joachim, promised that all the privileges of the Kyiv metropolitanate listed by the hetman would be preserved. Only the proposal to keep the title of Exarch of the Ecumenical Patriarch of Constantinople after the Metropolitan of Kyiv was rejected.

In October, Gedeon went to Moscow, where on 8 November 1685, he was appointed metropolitan of Kyiv. In the Assumption Cathedral of the Kremlin, he took an oath of allegiance to Patriarch Joachim "and if it happens, then to him bless the future Holy Patriarch of Moscow and All Russia, and the entire Most Reverend Council — Russian Most Reverend Metropolitans, Archbishops and Bishops."

Thus, the transition of the Metropolitan of Kyiv to the jurisdiction of Moscow actually took place. However, from a canonical point of view, this Synodal Letter could not be considered legitimate without its approval (albeit retrospectively) by the Ecumenical Patriarch of Constantinople.

== Negotiations with the Ecumenical Patriarchate of Constantinople ==
=== Embassy to Constantinople ===
In November 1685 a deacon, Nikita Alekseev, was sent to Constantinople. When he passed through Ukraine, he was joined by the personal envoy of Hetman Lysytsia Ivan Pavlovych. They were instructed to ask the Ecumenical Patriarch of Constantinople to transfer the Metropolitanate of Kyiv to Moscow's jurisdiction. The ambassadors were presented with diplomas of Patriarch Joachim, Tsars Ivan and Peter Alekseevich and Hetman Ivan Samoilovych.

=== Political background ===
It should be borne in mind that by the middle of the 17th century there were quite close relations between the Eastern patriarchs and the Moscow sovereigns. The Greek clergy regularly visited Moscow, receiving generous alms. At the same time, the contacts of the Greek hierarchs with Moscow were not limited exclusively to the ecclesiastical sphere. As early as the end of the 16th century, the eastern patriarchs became, in the words of the professor, "political agents" of the Moscow tsars. They bring to Moscow information about the political situation in the Ottoman Empire. Patriarch Dosipheus of Jerusalem in one of his letters addressed to the Moscow tsar directly wrote: "In your God-protected state we have the rank of informer." However, material interest was not the only stimulus that prompted the Greek hierarchs to such cooperation. The Eastern Orthodox clergy enthusiastically embraced and strongly supported the political strengthening of Moscow, hoping that in time it was the Moscow tsar who would help the Greeks overthrow the hated Ottoman rule.

The activities of the Eastern hierarchs in favor of Moscow's political interests were of concern to the Ottoman government, which closely monitored all contacts between the patriarchs and the Moscow ambassadors. Patriarch Parthenius was hanged for secret connections with Moscow, and Patriarch Paisius of Alexandria and Macarius of Antioch lost their chairs for a trip to Moscow. In the second half of the 17th century, Moscow ambassadors to Constantinople were allowed to meet with patriarchs only after all political matters had been resolved with the vizier.

From the very beginning of the liberation war under the leadership of Bohdan Khmelnytskyi, the Eastern patriarchs considered it a natural result of Ukraine's accession to the Moscow Empire. As early as December 1648, Patriarch Paisius of Jerusalem met with Khmelnytsky on his way to Moscow and tried to persuade him to accept Moscow citizenship. He asked for the same in Moscow. In 1651, the Patriarch of Constantinople said the same in a conversation with Khmelnytskyi's envoy in Constantinople. Mediation services in establishing Khmelnytsky's contacts with Moscow were also undertaken by other Eastern hierarchs. According to the Greeks, Ukraine's accession to the Moscow state gave hope for a joint campaign of Cossacks and Moscovites against the Tatars and Ottomans.

It is very characteristic that the same patriarch Paisius of Jerusalem hoped that after Ukraine the Danube principalities (Wallachia and Moldavia) would become part of the Tsardom of Moscovy. In 1655 he even directly asked Tsar Alexis I The Quietest to accept the Principality of Moldavia under his patronage. This request was supported by the Patriarch of Antioch Macarius. However, this plan was not implemented.

=== The beginning of negotiations ===
The Moscow ambassadors arrived in Adrianople in the spring of 1686. Here, the Greek Yurii Metsevit recommended that they first go to the vizier and ask him to help resolve the issue of the Metropolitanate of Kyiv. Thanks to Alekseev, such an offer seemed strange. He considered this a purely ecclesiastical matter, and therefore thought that the patriarch could resolve it without consulting the vizier. To which Metsevit objected: "If the patriarch does this work without a vizier's decree, and some metropolitan reports that the patriarch is writing off with Moscow, the patriarch will be executed immediately."

Then the ambassadors tried to meet with the Patriarch of Jerusalem Dosipheus, whom Moscow rightly considered his ally. However, this hierarch also refused to meet with the delegation without the permission of the vizier. Then Alekseev still turned to the vizier, and with his consent, went to meet with Dosipheus.

=== Negotiations with the Patriarch of Jerusalem ===
During the conversation with the Moscow ambassadors, Patriarch Dosipheus spoke very strongly against the subordination of the Metropolitanate of Kyiv to Moscow. He considered the very image of the Moscow government to be deeply flawed. Dosipheus quite rightly remarked that before he was to receive the blessing of Constantinople, and only then to deliver the Metropolitan of Kyiv in Moscow:

And then sent to ask for a blessing, when already delivered! This is the Eastern Church's division!

Probably, after a conversation with Alekseev and the Fox, Patriarch Dosipheus sent a letter to the Moscow tsars and Patriarch Joachim, in which he argued the illegality and inappropriateness of their case.

One of the most important arguments made by Patriarch Dosipheus against the annexation of the Kyiv metropolitanate to the Moscow patriarchate was his fear that the act would not be recognized in the Polish-Lithuanian Commonwealth, where a large part of the metropolitanate was located. Orthodox living in the Polish-Lithuanian Commonwealth will be looking for another metropolitan, which could lead to a new schism.

Interesting is the strict moral assessment given by Patriarch Dosipheus to Moscow's actions:

What kind of guilt to snatch someone else's diocese? Is there no shame from men, is there no sin from God? In this way you send money and drive people crazy, take letters contrary to the Church and God. Your messenger told us that he did not bring a letter from you, but ordered him to give us alms if we give him the letter he wants; and if we do not give it to him, he will not give it to us.

From these words of Patriarch Dosipheus, it becomes clear that the Moscow envoy conducted an open bargain in Adrianople. He offered Dosipheus a generous "alms" for his assistance in obtaining a leave certificate. The indignant First Hierarch of the Church of Jerusalem called it a clear simony and extortion "for the humiliation of the Eastern Church."

However, in a letter to the Moscow sovereigns, Patriarch Dosipheus wrote that although the actions of Patriarch Joachim did not deserve approval, he, Dosipheus, was glad that Kyiv had finally found the metropolitan, "we accept his ordination and leave the rest, we pray to the Lord Christ that He will give him the strength to do good voluntarily in God's way."

However, Patriarch Dosipheus flatly refused to act as a mediator in the negotiations between the Moscow ambassadors and the Ecumenical Patriarch of Constantinople.

=== Bargaining for the metropolis ===
From the letter of Dosipheus to Patriarch Joachim it is clear that even when Alexeev and the Fox were in Adrianople, Patriarch Dionysius of Constantinople himself tried to establish contact with them. Dosipheus says that an archimandrite addressed Alekseev on behalf of Dionysius, who directly asked the Moscow envoy for money for the issuance of the necessary diploma. However, Alekseev replied, "let him first give him a Act, and only then take money from him."

When it became clear that the issue could not be resolved directly with the patriarch, the Moscow ambassadors went to the vizier. And here was another aspect of this case.

=== The political basis ===
The time when Alekseev and Lisitsa arrived in Adrianople was a time of severe crisis of the Ottoman Empire. In 1683 the Ottomans started another war with Austria. On July 16, they laid siege to Vienna, after which panic broke out throughout Europe. The Polish-Lithuanian Commonwealth and Venice entered the war. King of the Commonwealth Jan III Sobieski with his army approached Vienna and completely defeated the Ottomans. Grand Vizier Kara-Mustafa escaped from the battlefield and was later executed by order of the Sultan, a traditional execution for the Ottoman nobles – strangled with a silk cord. The Allied army counterattacked. The Ottomans suffered one defeat after another. In 1686 they left the Hungarian capital, which they had held for more than 140 years.

So the Moscow ambassadors arrived in the Ottoman Empire in the midst of this war, when the situation of the Ottoman Empire became close to catastrophic. At the same time, Moscow in 1681 concluded a peace treaty with the Ottoman Empire, and therefore was considered by the sultan as a potential ally. In addition, despite the Andrusiv Peace (1667), the Moscovy continued to be at war with the Polish-Lithuanian Commonwealth, at that time one of the main enemies of the Ottoman Empire. In this situation, the vizier decided to do everything possible to satisfy the request of the Moscow sovereigns to subordinate Patriarch Joachim to the Kyiv metropolitanate, hoping to strengthen his friendship with Moscow. And when Alekseev came to him, "the vizier showed complete readiness to fulfill all his wishes, and, among other things, promised to call Dosipheus to himself and order him to fulfill the request of the Moscow government regarding the Metropolitanate of Kyiv."

=== Consent of Patriarchs Dosipheus and Dionysius ===
After meeting with the vizier, Alekseev again visited Patriarch Dosipheus and found in him a complete change:

I found in the rules that it was free for any bishop to release from his diocese to another bishop; I will persuade Patriarch Dionysius to carry out the king's will, and I myself will write to the great emperors and to Patriarch Joachim and blessings from myself especially, and not together with Dionysius.

Documentary evidence of this change are the letters of Patriarch Dosifey addressed to the Orthodox population of the Polish-Lithuanian Commonwealth and Hetman Samoilovich. In them, the Archbishop of Jerusalem called for Gedeon (Sviatopolk-Chetvertynskyi) to be considered the true Metropolitan of Kyiv and to assist him in his archpastoral ministry. Patriarch Dosipheus received 200 rubles from Nikita Alekseev for such a significant adjustment of his position.

Meanwhile, Patriarch Dionysius of Constantinople arrived in Adrianople. He had to meet with the vizier to obtain confirmation of his authority. Dionysius was elected five times during his life and then dethroned from the patriarchal throne of Constantinople. In 1686 he ascended the patriarchal throne for the fourth time. Upon learning the will of the vizier, Dionysius promised to comply with Moscow's request as soon as he returned to Constantinople and convened a council of metropolitans.

In May, returning to Constantinople, Patriarch Dionysius wrote a letter to the Moscow emperors, Patriarch Joyakim and Hetman Samoilovich, in which he spoke of his consent to the Moscow Patriarch's permission to ordain metropolitans to the Metropolitanate of Kyiv. At the same time, Patriarch Dosipheus noted that Constantinople only gave the ROC permission for the ordination of Kyiv metropolitans in Moscow, while Kyiv remained the diocese of the Ecumenical Patriarchate of Constantinople.

=== Council of Constantinople in 1686 ===
Finally, in June, the Council of Bishops was convened in Constantinople, at which a final decision was made on this issue. The Council issued a letter declaring Gedeon Sviatopolk-Chetvertynskyi the legitimate Metropolitan of Kyiv. In addition to Patriarch Dionysius, the letter was also signed by 21 metropolitans. In addition, Dionysius in June issued two more letters addressed to Hetman Samoilovych and all the faithful children of the Metropolitanate of Kyiv, in which he said that he gave the right to deliver the Metropolitan of Kyiv to the Moscow Patriarch, and ordered from now on to send all newly elected metropolitans for consecration in Moscow. The Metropolitan of Kyiv was the first to mention the name in the diptych of the Ecumenical Patriarch of Constantinople, so that it would be a testimony to the authority of the Ecumenical Throne over the Metropolitan of Kyiv, and meant that the Metropolitanate of Kyiv continued to be part of the Ecumenical Patriarchate of Constantinople.

Nikita Alekseev presented Patriarch Dionysius with 200 gold and "three forty sables" for these documents, for which he received a handwritten receipt from Dionysius. It is noteworthy that in his letter to the Moscow tsars, the Ecumenical Patriarch of Constantinople asked to send a "salary" also for the other bishops who signed the act.

=== Changing political circumstances ===
The rapid completion of the case of subordination of the metropolis is explained, first of all, by the desire of the Ottoman government to maintain peace with Moscow. However, the hopes of the vizier were in vain. In the spring of 1686, when the Moscow ambassadors were in the Ottoman Empire, negotiations were already underway in Moscow with the personal representatives of the King of the Polish-Lithuanian Commonwealth for the signing of a peace treaty. Treaty of Perpetual Peace with the Polish-Lithuanian Commonwealth was concluded on April 21. Moscow undertook to break the peace with the Ottoman sultan and the Crimean khan and immediately send troops to the Crimean crossings to protect the Commonwealth from Tatar attacks. The Polish-Lithuanian Commonwealth government, for its part, guaranteed that the Orthodox population in the Polish-Lithuanian Commonwealth could not be forced into Greek Catholicism, and that the higher Orthodox clergy would be ordained by the Metropolitan of Kyiv.

However, this agreement could enter into force only after its signing by the King of the Polish-Lithuanian Commonwealth. As Jan III Sobieski was on a military campaign in the Principality of Moldavia at that time, the treaty was confirmed by him only in the autumn of 1686. At the same time in Moscow it was decided to organize a military campaign against the Crimean Khanate, an ally of the Ottoman Empire.

This actual declaration of war on the Ottoman Empire almost crossed out the results of the mission of deacon Nikita Alekseev. On the way back from Constantinople, the Moscow ambassador, along with his diplomas, was arrested while passing through the Crimea. The Moscow government barely managed to release him by sending an important Tatar prisoner to the Crimean khan in exchange.

As soon as Constantinople learned of Moscow's conclusion of an "eternal peace" with the Polish-Lithuanian Commonwealth, the position of Patriarch Dionysius became extremely unenviable. Opposition in the Synod was immediately formed against him. Dissatisfied with Dionysius, the bishops accused him of secret ties with Moscow, citing the fact that he allowed the Moscow Patriarch to ordain the Metropolitan of Kyiv. As a result, Dionysius lost his patriarchate two months after his official accession to the throne of Constantinople.

In 1687, the Council of Constantinople condemned Patriarch Dionysius for the transfer of the Metropolitanate of Kyiv to Moscow, assessing this act as simony, i.e. bribery, and deprived Dionysius of the patriarchal throne. Thus, the action of Patriarch Dionysius was declared illegal by the council.

== Absorption of the metropolis by the Moscow Patriarchate ==
None of the conditions of the Synodal Letter of 1686 was observed by the Moscow Patriarchate: the election of the metropolitan passed into the hands of the Moscovian Synod, the commemoration of the Ecumenical Patriarch was among the first to cease (especially in the 20th century), the privileges of the Metropolitan of Kyiv were abolished and the Metropolitanate of Kyiv itself ceased to exist as a church unit.

=== Narrowing the jurisdiction of the Metropolitan of Kyiv ===
The conflict between Gedeon Sviatopolk-Chetvertynskyi and Lazar Baranovych led to the fact that the latter decided to leave the jurisdiction of the Metropolitan of Kyiv and submit directly to the Moscow Patriarch. Thus, the Diocese of Chernihiv eparchy actually left the Metropolitanate of Kyiv. A similar fate befell the Diocese of Mahilioŭ. From the beginning of the 18th century, bishops were appointed here not from Kyiv, but from Moscow (since the founding of the Synod, respectively, from St. Petersburg).

Despite the guarantees given by the government of the Polish-Lithuanian Commonwealth in 1686, Greek Catholic propaganda was not stopped. As a result, by the beginning of the 18th century, the Lviv, Lutsk, and Przemyśl dioceses finally became Catholic. So, twenty-five years after joining the Moscow Patriarchate, Metropolitan of Kyiv from the head of a large autonomous church district became the ruling bishop of the Kyiv eparchy alone.

His two successors, Barlaam Yasinskyi (1690–1707) and Joasaph Krokovskyi (1708–1718), were elected to the Councils in Kyiv and were only ordained in Moscow. However, after Peter I carried out the Synodal reform, the right to elect metropolitans by free votes of the Kyiv clergy was lost.

=== Loss of metropolitan status ===
In 1722 the Kyiv archpastor was "elected" according to a new scheme. The Synod proposed to the emperor four candidates, from which Peter the Great chose Barlaam (Voniatovych), who held the throne of Kyiv until 1730. It is noteworthy that Bishop Barlaam no longer received the rank of metropolitan, but only the archbishop. Since then, the Kyiv metropolitanate has in fact become one of the ordinary dioceses of the Russian Church.

Gradually, the peculiarities of Ukrainian church singing, Ukrainian pronunciation of liturgical texts, and Ukrainian printing of church books were largely leveled. Therefore, the fears expressed by the Ukrainian clergy in 1685 turned out to be quite justified.

== The reasons for the Synodal Letter of 1686 ==
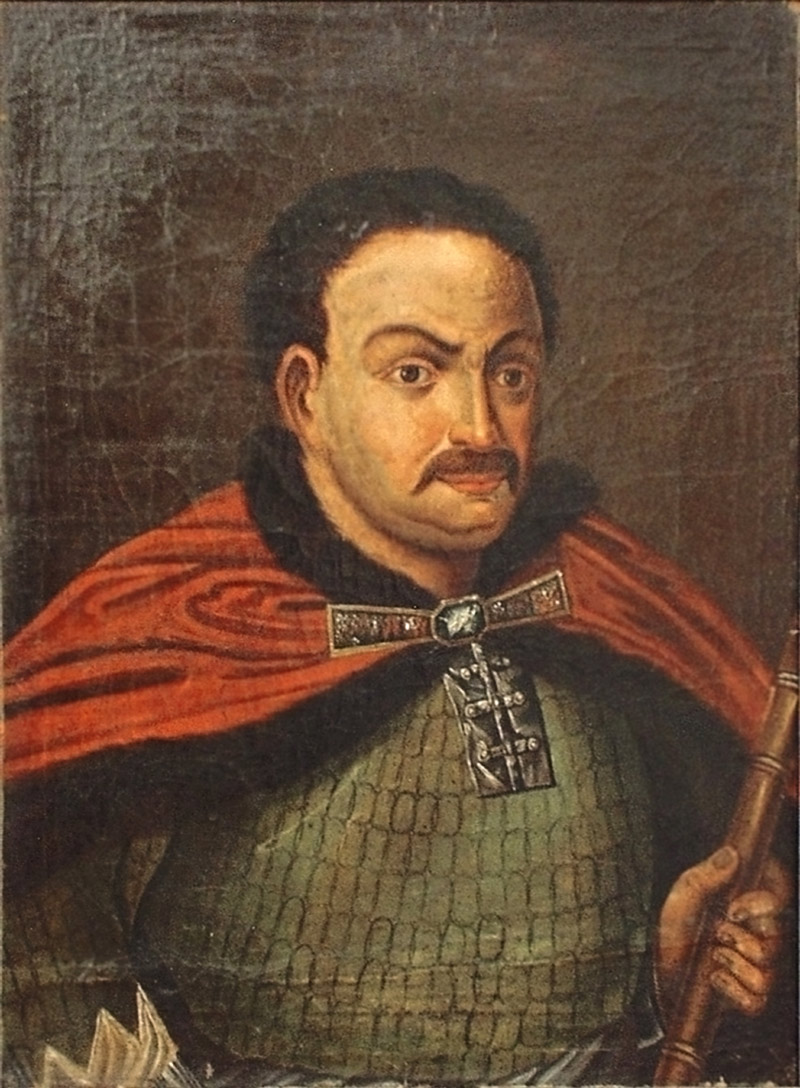
Pro-Moscovian Hetman Ivan Samoilovych

The events of 1686 vividly reflected the internal state of the Moscow Patriarchate, the Ecumenical Patriarchate of Constantinople, and the Metropolitanate of Kyiv. First of all, Moscow, feeling its political power, considered it permissible to deviate significantly from the canonical order in resolving church issues. Both the procedure for electing Metropolitan Gedeon, and his enthronement in Moscow, and the retrospective blessing of the Ecumenical Patriarch of Constantinople were carried out through a direct violation of the canons. Secondly, the behavior of the Eastern hierarchs in resolving this issue was completely determined by two factors – the position of the Ottoman government and personal material gain. The change of mood of Jerusalem Patriarch Dosipheus after the meeting of the Moscow ambassadors with the vizier shows that even this, not the worst representative of the Greek episcopate, was able to significantly adjust their canonical views under the influence of these two factors. Finally, thirty years after the Pereyaslav Rada, the Ukrainian clergy changed greatly, and, in the words of ND Polonska-Vasylenko, a "great evolution" took place with it. If in 1654 it firmly defended its canonical subordination to Constantinople, in 1685 it humbly referred the matter to the discretion of the Patriarch of Constantinople. It is noteworthy that there were no protests against the procedure of electing and consecrating Metropolitan Gedeon either by the hetman, or by the Cossack officers, or by the church fraternities.

The conditionality of the Synodal Letter is quite obvious due to the political situation in the second half of the 17th century. The process of Ukraine's integration into the Moscow state could not but lead to a gradual smoothing of the peculiarities of its administrative system, local self-government, and education system. In this context, the entry of the Kyiv metropolitanate into the Moscow Patriarchate after the Pereyaslav Rada was inevitable. This relentless logic of the historical process was well understood by both Russian and Ukrainian historians. For example, Professor Ilarion Ohienko, later Metropolitan Hilarion, wrote that the accession of the Metropolitanate of Kyiv to the Moscow Patriarchate:

logically followed from the accession of the political, from the act of 1654, and there was no strength to prevent it. For thirty-two years (1654–1686) the clergy defended the independence of their Church – and one can only wonder that it so stubbornly and for a long time did not give up its freedom

== Repeal of the Synodal Letter of 1686 ==
The transfer of the Metropolitanate of Kyiv under the control of the Moscow Orthodox Church was never recognized by the Ecumenical Patriarchate of Constantinople. The conditions set out in the Synodal Letter were not met by the Moscow Orthodox Church: the election of the metropolitan passed into the hands of the Russian Synod, the commemoration of the Ecumenical Patriarch of Constantinople ceased, and the privileges of the Kyiv metropolitan were abolished, even the metropolitanate ceased to exist as a church unit. Ukrainian national church historiography has always denied the transfer of the Kyiv metropolitanate under the omophorion of the Russian Orthodox Church.

In the 20th century, the Ecumenical Patriarchate of Constantinople repeatedly criticized the events of 1686. In 1924, Ecumenical Patriarch Gregory VII gave the Polish Autocephalous Orthodox Church a tomos on autocephaly, citing the fact that the accession of the Metropolitanate of Kyiv to the Moscow Patriarchate was not carried out according to church canons. So in 1924 in the tomos of Patriarch Gregory VII on the gift of autocephaly to the Polish Autocephalous Orthodox Church where it is said that autocephaly is granted:

listening to the loud voice of the canonical duty that imposes on our Holy Ecumenical Throne the care of the Holy Orthodox Churches in need; seeing that history also testifies in favor of the above (for it is written that the alienation from our Throne of the Metropolitanate of Kyiv and the Orthodox Churches of Lithuania and Poland dependent on it, as well as their affiliation to the Holy Church of Moscow, from the very beginning were not in agreement with legitimate canonical prescriptions, also not observed what was jointly stated about the full ecclesiastical self-sufficiency of the Metropolitan of Kyiv, who bore the title of Exarch of the Ecumenical Throne).

Patriarch Gregory VII named three grounds that allowed him to grant autocephaly to the Orthodox Church within the Polish Republic. This is, firstly, the need to reconcile church borders with new political borders, secondly, the right of the Patriarchal See of Constantinople to provide support to the Orthodox churches "in difficulty" and, thirdly, the violation of canonical rules committed in 1686 (Orthodox the dioceses of Poland, Lithuania, and Belarus in 1686 were part of the Metropolitanate of Kyiv). However, the act of 1686 was not annulled by Patriarch Gregory.

In 1990, Ecumenical Patriarch Demetrius wrote in a letter to the Patriarch Alexy II of Moscow that the Ecumenical Patriarchate of Constantinople recognized the Russian Orthodox Church within 1589. On the same grounds, a tomos on autocephaly was given to the Orthodox Church of Ukraine in 2019. That is, the Synodal Letter of "transfer" of the Metropolitanate of Kyiv Dionysius Constantinople Patriarchate did not recognize.

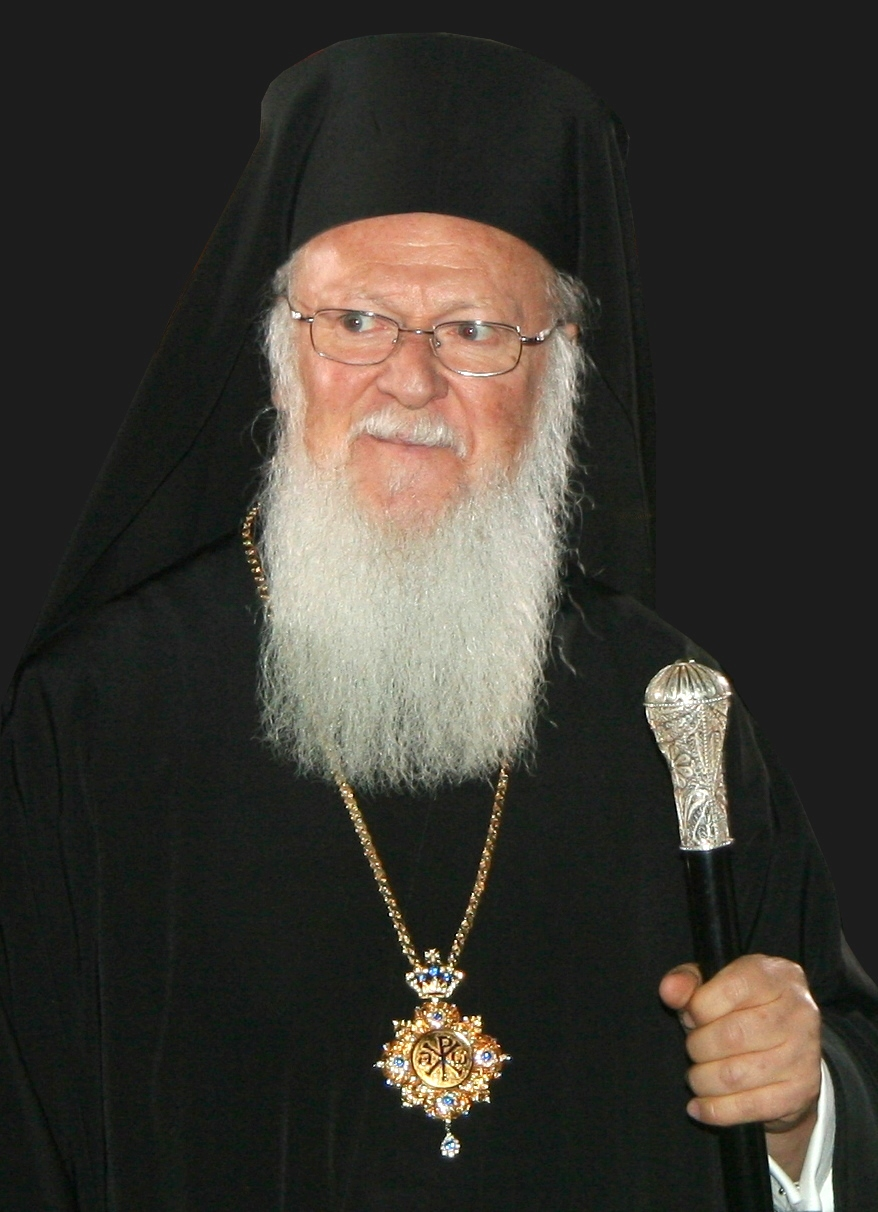
Ecumenical Patriarch Bartholomew I of Constantinople

The statement made in March 2005 by Archbishop Vsevolod of Skopel (Maidan), who was rightly considered the curator of the "Ukrainian policy" of the Ecumenical Patriarchate of Constantinople, had a great resonance. At a meeting with President Viktor Yushchenko, he said that the Ecumenical Patriarchate of Constantinople had never recognized the legitimacy of the transition of the Metropolitanate of Kyiv to the Moscow Patriarchate, and therefore Constantinople continues to consider Ukraine its canonical territory to this day. This statement provoked strong protests from the Russian Orthodox Church, but Constantinople did not officially deny (as well as confirm) anything.

In 2008, during the jubilee celebrations dedicated to the 1020th anniversary of the Baptism of Kyivan Rus in Kyiv, Ecumenical Patriarch Bartholomew I repeatedly named the Patriarchate of Constantinople the Mother Church in relation to the Ukrainian Orthodox Church of the Moscow Patriarchate. And on July 26, 2008, in his program address to the Ukrainian people, delivered on Sophia Square in Kyiv, Patriarch Bartholomew directly called the accession of the Kyiv metropolitanate to the Moscow Patriarchate an annexation. At the same time, he stressed that his Church agreed to "limit itself" to promote the fuller use of the "spiritual heritage of Byzantium", as well as to protect the Orthodox identity of the Ukrainian people.

Patriarch Bartholomew put the events of 1686 on a par with the gift of autocephaly to a number of local Churches in the Balkans: Greece, Serbia, and Albania.

Before the election of the Primate of the Orthodox Church of Ukraine, Patriarch Bartholomew I sent a letter to Metropolitan Onufriy warning him of the loss of the title "Metropolitan of Kyiv": "in the form of austerity and mercy, we inform you that after the election you will be able to bear the title of Metropolitan of Kyiv ecclesiologically and canonically, which you still bear now in violation of the described conditions of official documents of 1686." The same opinion was expressed by Bishop Eustratius Zoria.

The Holy Synod of the Ecumenical Patriarchate, during the session of October 11, 2018, "Revoked the Synodal Letter of 1686, issued in the circumstances of the time, which gave only the right to the Patriarch of Moscow to ordain the Metropolitan of Kyiv elected by the clergy and the faithful of his metropolis who was to mention the Ecumenical Patriarch as his First Hierarch in any service, proclaiming and confirming his canonical dependence on the Mother Church of Constantinople."

Also, the Synod of the Ecumenical Patriarchate lifted the anathema from the Patriarch of the Ukrainian Orthodox Church of the Kyiv Patriarchate Filaret. He and the head of the Ukrainian Orthodox Autocephalous Church Macarius were given back their canonical status. Earlier, in September 2018, Archbishop Job of Telmessos (Getcha) stated that the Ecumenical Patriarchate of Constantinople does not recognize the canonical anathema imposed on Ukrainian Hetman Ivan Mazepa by the Moscow Patriarchate:

Despite the imposition of a non-canonical anathema on Hetman Mazepa by the Russian Church, the representatives of the Ecumenical Patriarchate did not recognize it, as it was imposed for political motives as a means of political and ideological repression and had no religious, theological or canonical reasons. During his emigration to Bender, Ivan Mazepa freely confessed to the Orthodox priests of the Ecumenical Patriarchate. It was they who instructed him on his deathbed and released him from his sins, and then buried him. His body was laid to rest in the Orthodox Church in the town of Varnytsia, which was under the jurisdiction of the Ecumenical Patriarchate, and was later reburied in Galati on the Danube, where the local metropolitan served a funeral service in the central cathedral of St. George's Monastery. This metropolitan was the hierarch of the Ecumenical Patriarchate. So, we can say that Ivan Mazepa died as a faithful Mother Church, the Ecumenical Patriarchate!

In October 2020, Ecumenical Patriarch Bartholomew I wrote a letter stating that since the Unification Council and the granting of the Tomos of the Orthodox Church of Ukraine, "the new autocephalous Church of Ukraine is the only canonical Orthodox Church in the Ukrainian State, and His Beatitude Metropolitan of Kyiv and All Ukraine must be recognized as canonical Primate. According to the canonical principle of territoriality, which is an integral and constant fact of Orthodox ecclesiology, no Church can be present within the jurisdiction of the Church of Ukraine. Nevertheless, in the spirit of pastoral vigilance, we temporarily tolerate the existence of Ukrainian hierarchs under Russia not as local ruling bishops, but only as titular or residing in Ukraine, hierarchs, according to Canon 8 of the Council of Nicaea, hoping that, by the will of God, they will soon be united with the local Church. For this reason, His Eminence Onuphrius is no longer seen as the canonical Metropolitan of Kyiv, but as a hierarch living in Kyiv, as it was published in the Yearbook of the Ecumenical Patriarchate for 2020."

== Church-canonical aspect ==
The Moscow Patriarchate has always regarded this event as a canonical and justified accession, even a "return of the Western Rus metropolitanate to the mother Church," and reacted categorically and harshly to any attempt to question this thesis.

At the same time, the semi-autonomous Ukrainian Orthodox Church of the Moscow Patriarchate generally demonstrated a more cautious approach to the problem. In particular, its historians and canonists did not ignore the facts of violations of the canons, the disagreement of the then hierarchy, but did not deny the fact of today's subordination to the Moscow Patriarchate, emphasizing the later reception of this event. Instead, in recent years, the ROCU has been actively trying to regain all the autonomous rights that were abolished by Peter I while remaining under the jurisdiction of the Moscow Patriarchate. Only with the enthronement of Patriarch Kirill Gundyayev was the expansion of these rights completely suspended.

=== Thoughts of theologians ===
According to Konstantin Vetoshnikov, Doctor of Theology at Aristotle University in Thessaloniki (Greece), researcher at the Byzantine Library (Collège de France, Paris), the subordination of the Metropolitanate of Kyiv to the Moscow patriarch was initially carried out without the permission of substantial canonical crime "and violation of the following canons: 35 rules of the Apostles, 6 rules of the First Ecumenical Council, 13 rules of the Council of Antioch, 22 rules of the Council of Antioch, 15 rules of the Council of Sardis; invasion of another's diocese is condemned in accordance with canons 2 rule II of the Ecumenical Council, rules 13 and 22 of the Council of Antioch, 3 rule of the Council of Sardis; the subordination of foreign provinces, as well as the violation of the ancient rights of the churches, is condemned in accordance with the canons 8 of Rule III of the Ecumenical Council, 39 of Rule VI of the Ecumenical Council.

== See also ==
- 15th–16th century Moscow–Constantinople schism
- 2018 Moscow–Constantinople schism
