= Metropolis of Kyiv =

Orthodox diocese

Metropolis of Kyiv Greek: Μητρόπολις Κιέβου Ukrainian: Київська митрополія Belarusian: Кіеўская мітраполія, Kijeŭskaja mitrapolija
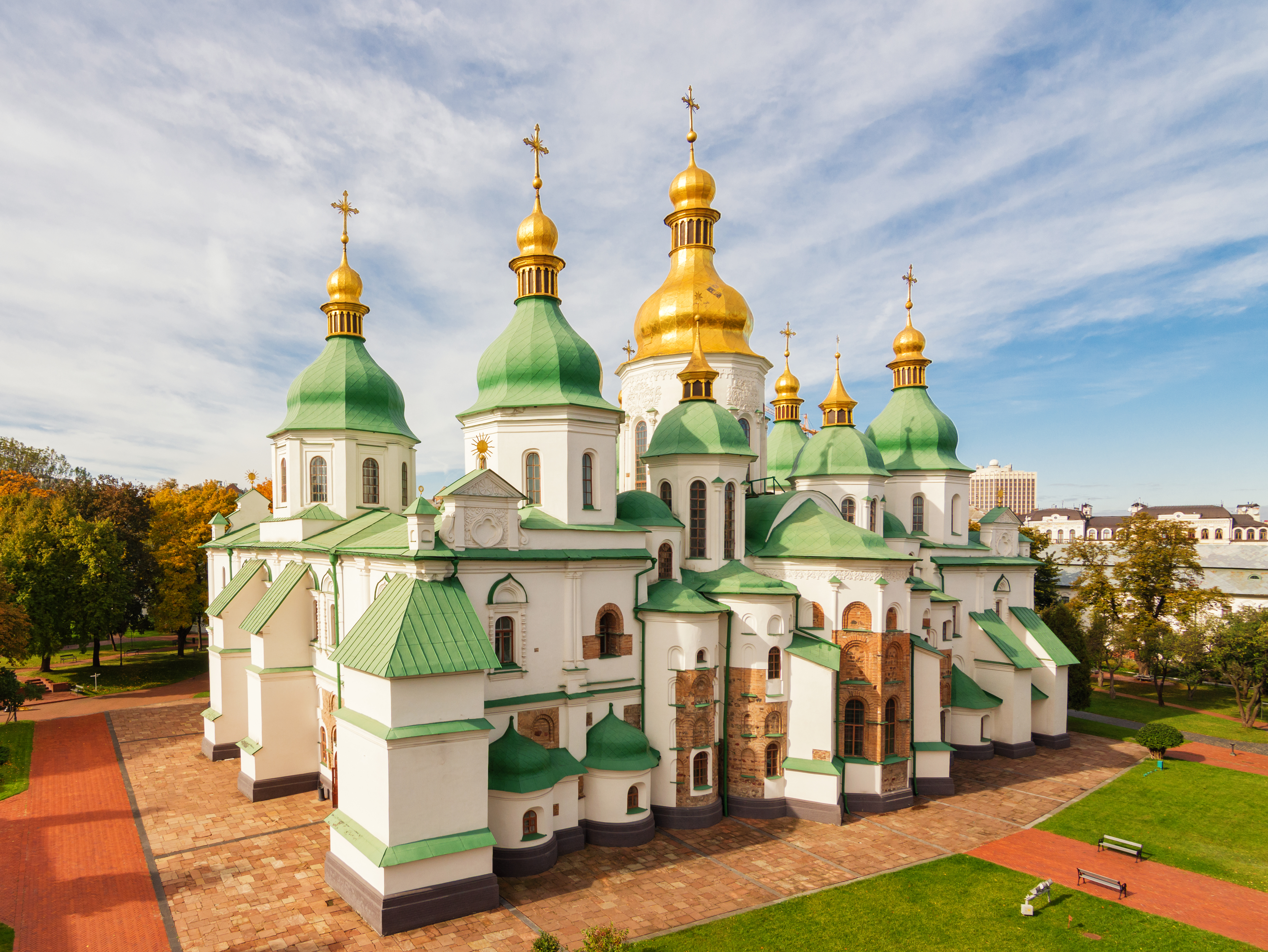
- Saint Sophia Cathedral, Kyiv

Location
- Country: Ukraine
- Territory: Kyivan Rus, Kingdom of Ruthenia, Grand Duchy of Lithuania, Kingdom of Poland, Polish–Lithuanian Commonwealth, Vladimir-Suzdal, Novgorod Republic, Grand Duchy of Moscow
- Metropolitan: Metropolitan of Kyiv and All Rus; Metropolitan of Kyiv
- Headquarters: Kyiv, Ukraine

Information
- Denomination: Eastern Orthodox
- Rite: Byzantine Rite
- Established: 988
- Dissolved: January 6, 2019
- Cathedral: Saint Sophia
- Language: Church Slavonic, Old East Slavic, Ruthenian, Ukrainian
- Calendar: Julian calendar
- Parent church: Ecumenical Patriarchate of Constantinople
- Governance: Autonomous Metropolis

The Metropolis of Kyiv (Greek: Μητρόπολις Κιέβου, romanized: Mitrópolis Kiévou; Ukrainian: Ки́ївська митропо́лія, romanized: Kyivska mytropoliia; Belarusian: Кіеўская мітраполія, Kijeŭskaja mitrapolija) was an autonomous metropolis of the Ecumenical Patriarchate of Constantinople with center in Kyiv after its formation in 988 as a result of the Christianization of Rus by Volodymyr the Great until January 6, 2019, when it received the Tomos on Autocephaly.

In 1596, the Union of Brest was adopted which transferred the ecclesiastical jurisdiction of the metropolis from the Ecumenical Patriarchate to the Holy See. As a sui juris Eastern Catholic particular church, the metropolis retained its ancient rights; in time, it came to be known as the Ruthenian Uniate Church. Some clergy and laity in the Commonwealth continued to give their loyalty to Constantinople but had no hierarchs to support them. In 1620, the Ukrainian Cossacks, led by Hetman Petro Konashevych-Sahaidachny, secured the restoration of the Orthodox hierarchy in the Commonwealth as the Metropolis of Kiev, Galicia and all Rus'.

In 1685, the Moscow Patriarchate began the annexation of the Metropolis of Kiev of the Ecumenical Patriarchate, ordaining Metropolitan Gedeon of Kiev in Moscovy. In 1686, through simony, Ecumenical Patriarch Dionysius IV (who was later anathema) issued a Synodal letter granting the right to ordinate the Metropolitan of Kiev to the Moscow Patriarch in the manner of austerity elected by the council of clergy and the faithful of his diocese. It was obligatory that the Metropolitan of Kyiv should mention the Ecumenical Patriarch of Constantinople as his First Hierarch in any service, proclaiming and confirming his canonical dependence on the Mother Church of Constantinople, but none of these conditions were met. The Metropolis of Kiev actually became one of the ordinary dioceses of the Moscow Patriarchate, when Peter the Great in 1722 elected Barlaam (Voniatovych) in the rank of archbishop, not metropolitan. The Holy Synod of the Ecumenical Patriarchate in the process of granting autocephaly to the Church of Ukraine during its meeting on October 11, 2018, canceled the Synodal Letter of 1686 due to simony and its gross violation.

Since its founding, the Metropolis of Kyiv has served as the cradle of Ukrainian Christianity for Orthodox and Catholics. The autocephalous Orthodox Church of Ukraine, the sui iuris Belarusian Greek Catholic Church and Ukrainian Greek Catholic Church and the autonomous and independent Ukrainian Orthodox Church declare themselves the heirs of the Metropolis of Kyiv.

== History ==
=== Early Christianity ===
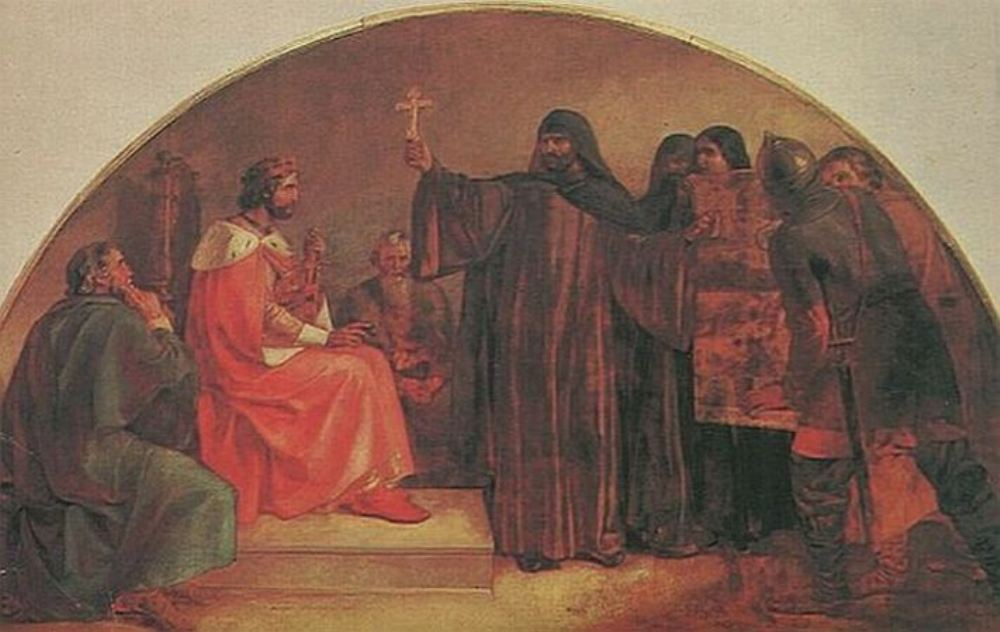
The choice of religion by Grand Prince Volodymyr

Christianity on the territory of modern Ukraine came in apostolic times. Legend has it that the Apostle Andrew the First-Called was on the hills of Kiev and proclaimed to his disciples "Do you see those mountains – God's grace shines on these mountains – a great city will arise here and God will build many churches." Thus, the supporters of this version consider the Ukrainian Church to be apostolic and put it on a par with other great churches. Many sources also indicate that the apostle Andrew preached on the northern coast of the Black Sea to the peoples of Scythia. In addition, the Apostle Paul preached in the lands of Macedonia, Greece, and the Kingdom of Bulgaria, and from there Christianity spread to the Ukrainian lands.

Prince Askold of Kiev was inclined to accept Christianity. According to legend, on the tomb of Askold was to be built the church of St. Nicholas, which would indicate that he was a Christian. However, Askold's limited adoption of Byzantine Christianity and his disregard for the specifics of the Slavic worldview led to the fact that in 882 Prince Oleg of Novgorod, using pagan opposition, captured Kiev. Oleg's successor at the Kiev table, Igor I (913–945), was tolerant of Christianity and did not hinder its gradual penetration into the country.

After Igor's death in 945, his widow, Grand Princess Olga, became the head of state. During her stay in 957 in Constantinople, great effort was made to obtain the highest state title of "daughter" of the emperor, for which Olga privately (most likely in Kiev in 955) was baptized. In her mail, Olga had a priest, Gregory, as told in detail by Constantine the Crimson. After returning from Constantinople, the princess began to pursue a line to limit the influence of paganism in the state, violating the "demonic trebors" and building a wooden church of St. Sophia. However, Olga's actions did not give the desired results. Unable to gain political advantage from Byzantium, she turned her attention to the West, inviting clergy from the German kingdom that had risen under Otto I (936–973). According to German chroniclers, ambassadors from Princess Olga in 959 "asked to consecrate a bishop and priests for this people." In response, he sent an embassy to Rus, headed by Bishop Adalbert. However, in 962 he returned with nothing. Olga's activity did not find support and understanding in her immediate environment. Even his son Sviatoslav, despite his mother's persuasion, refused to accept Christianity, but his sons Yaropolk and Oleg were probably already Christians. Moreover, in 979 Pope Benedict VII sent ambassadors to Yaropolk.

=== Formation ===
In 988 after the adoption of Christianity as the state religion in Kievan Rus, the Metropolis of Kiev was formed, which was subordinated to the Ecumenical Patriarch of Constantinople:

When the historical data, coming out of the fog of ambiguity, become accurate, they tell us about the dependence of our Church in hierarchical management on the Patriarch of Constantinople. Given that such data date back to the time of Prince Yaroslav, son and successor to the princely throne of Volodymyr, it is quite correct, in the absence of other information, we must assume that this dependence of our Church on Constantinople was under Prince Vladimir, ie from acceptance by him and our ancestors of the Christian faith from Byzantium

— Ivan Vlasovskyi, church historian

According to one version, the first hierarch was Michael I of Kiev. However, a number of researchers believe that he was Leon or Leontius (1004) or Bishop Nastas Korsunianin. The first Metropolitan of Kiev mentioned in historical sources was a contemporary of Yaroslav the Wise, the Greek Theopempt (1037–1048).

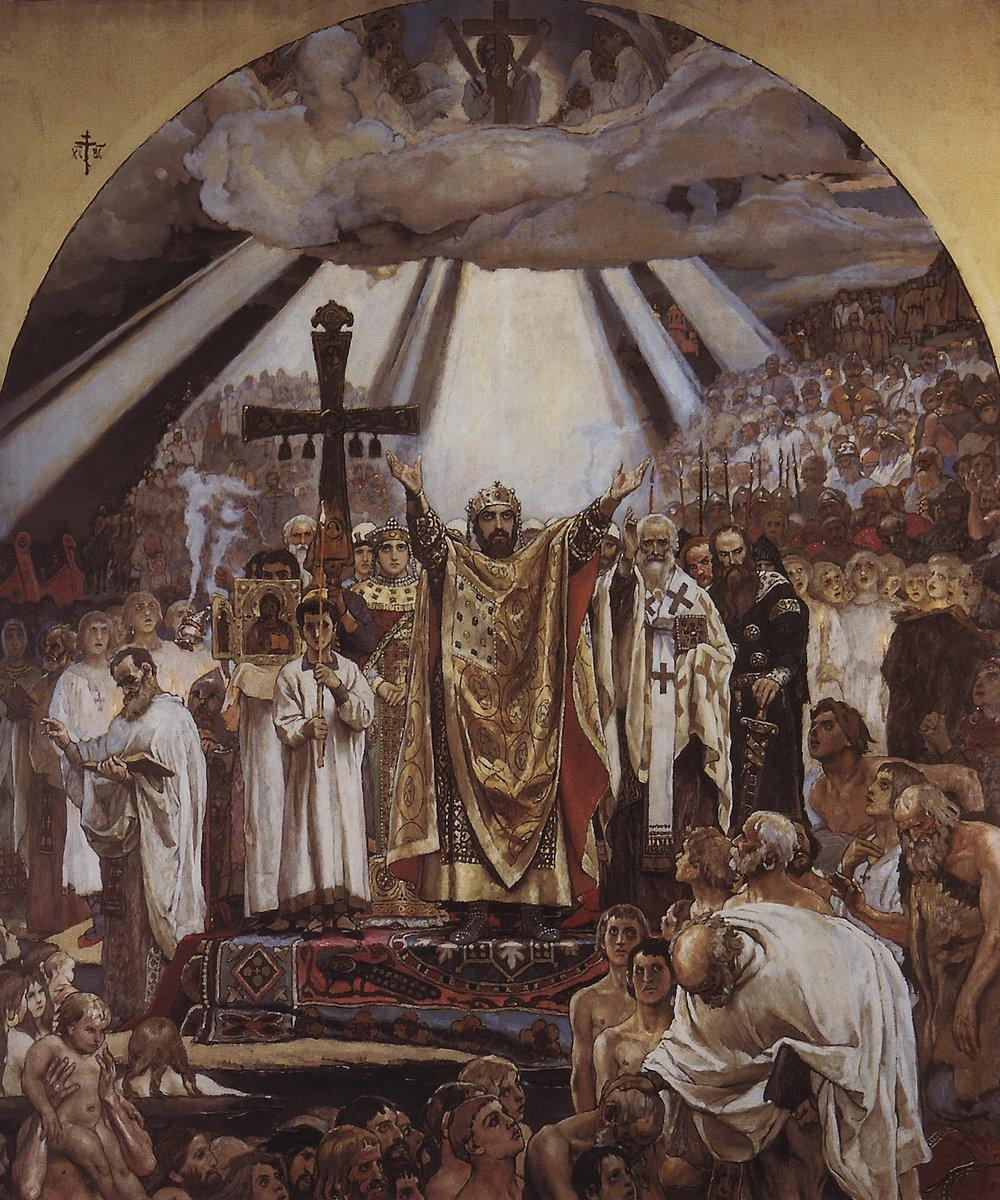
Christianization of Rus. Preparatory sketch of a fresco by Vasnetsov, Volodymyr Cathedral in Kyiv

In 1037, Prince Yaroslav the Wise built a new cathedral – St. Sophia – and moved the metropolitan cathedra there. An indisputable fact is Yaroslav's attempt to break with the Byzantine patriarchate. In 1051, with the assistance of Yaroslav the Wise, Hilarion, the first Ruthenian metropolitan, was elected Metropolitan of Kiev and All Rus. He reorganized the church hierarchy, standardized and improved the structure of the metropolis, and wrote many spiritual works. From the very beginning, the Church had the Holy Scriptures – the first and most important source of church life – in a well-understood language, such as the Gospel of Ostrom, written in Kiev in 1056, the Kiev Gospel in 1092, and others.

Under Yaroslav, the organization of the church began to take form. At the end of Vladimir's reign there were five dioceses; in Kiev, Chernihiv, Belgorod, Vladimir and Novgorod. Under Yaroslav, the sixth was founded – in Yurii, above Ros.

A delegation of the Metropolis of Kiev, blessed by Metropolitan Ivan III of Kiev and All Rus, took part in the Council in Bari (10–15.09.1089) convened by Pope Urban II to reconcile the churches. Members of this mission were in Bari to consecrate the transferred tomb of St. Nicholas of Myra (Feast of St. Nicholas). After that time came the rise of the cult of St. Nicholas in Rus.

During the pre-Mongol period, 22 Metropolitans of Kiev are known. Most of them were Greeks sent by the patriarchs of Constantinople. The natives of the lands of Rus were Metropolitan Hilarion (1051–1062), Ephraim (1089–1097), Clement Smoliatych, and Cyril II (1233–1236).

After the destruction of Kiev by Prince Vladimir-Suzdal, Andrey Bogolyubsky, when many churches and monasteries were destroyed and looted, the importance of Kiev as a spiritual center began to decline. The Metropolitans of Kiev began to settle with the northern princes. After the capture of Kiev by the Mongol-Tatars, the Metropolitans of Kiev finally chose Vladimir as their place of residence on Kliazma on the outskirts of northeastern Rus. This weakened their connection with the historical and cultural core of the state and forced the Galician-Volyn monarchs to begin the process of forming a separate Metropolis of Halych for the Kingdom of Ruthenia.

In the 14th and 15th centuries, the spiritual power of metropolitans extended to modern Ukrainian and Belarusian lands as part of the Grand Duchy of Lithuania, and while in Moscow they continued to use the title "Metropolitan of Kiev and All Rus." Moscow princes tried to use them for their political purposes, which led to the formation of the Lithuanian-Ruthenian metropolis.

In 1448, the Council of Moscow's Bishops, without the consent of the Ecumenical Patriarch, appointed Jonah, Bishop of Riazan, Metropolitan of Kiev. This event is considered the beginning of the separation of the Church of Moscovy. After the Union of Florence, before the fall of Constantinople in 1453, the Church of Moscovy, which was under the jurisdiction of the Ecumenical Patriarchate as part of the Metropolis of Kiev, seceded. Metropolitan Jonah, who died in 1461, was the last metropolitan in Moscow to hold the title of "Kiev and All Rus." The title of his successor at the department already included "Moscow and all of Rus." The Moscow metropolis was in an unrecognized state until its transformation into the Moscow patriarchate in 1589, i.e. 141 years.

After the de facto separation of the Moscow metropolis, in 1458 Gregory II was ordained metropolitan of Kiev, Galicia and all of Rus. The Lithuanian metropolis ceased to exist and became part of the Metropolis of Kiev. Although, for a long time the capital of the metropolitans was Navahrudak, and later Vilnius. The Metropolis of Kievincluded: Kiev, Briansk, Smolensk, Polatsk, Turaŭ, Lutsk, Volodymyr-Volyn, Bieraście, Przemyśl, Halych and Chełm. For some time, the Novgorod hierarch also recognized the Metropolitan of Kievas his superior.

The Metropolitans of Kiev during the second half of the 15th century were supporters of the Florentine Union of 1439 on the unification of the Catholic and Eastern Orthodox Churches and maintained ties with the Popes, as evidenced, in particular, by the letter of Bishop Mysail elected to the Metropolis of Kiev to Pope Sixtus IV in 1476 and a letter from Metropolitan Joseph Bolgarinovych from 1500 to Pope Alexander VI. Subsequently, these relations were interrupted due to the intervention of the Ecumenical Patriarchate. In 1443, the Florentine Union was condemned by the Orthodox Churches (Patriarchate of Alexandria, Patriarchate of Antioch and Patriarchate of Jerusalem) at the Cathedral of Jerusalem. These events caused a crisis in the Metropolis of Kiev.

In 1569, the Union of Lublin was signed, according to which the Ukrainian lands were transferred from the Grand Duchy of Lithuania to the Polish–Lithuanian Commonwealth. After that, the life of the Orthodox Church became much more complicated. External adverse factors, such as the active action of the Catholic clergy, Jesuits and gentry of the Polish-Lithuanian Commonwealth against the Ukrainian Church, overlapped with the internal problems of the Orthodox Church. Prior to his appointment to the metropolis, Metropolitan Sylvester was a civilian and demanded to collect tribute from parishioners. According to the testimony, Metropolitan Iona (Protasevych) sold the metropolis to his successor Ilia Kucha, under whom spiritual titles and monasteries were openly bought and sold. In this situation, at the end of the 16th century, two eastern patriarchs visited Ukraine. First, in 1586, the Patriarch of Antioch Joachim arrived, who, having become acquainted with the situation, granted the Lviv Dormition Brotherhood the rights of stauropegia. In 1589, Ecumenical Patriarch Jeremiah II visited Ruthenia. He also supported the Orthodox fraternities and removed Metropolitan Onesiphorus from the metropolitan throne, and appointed Archimandrite of the Miensk Monastery Michael Rohoza in his place. At the same time, the patriarch appointed Bishop Cyril Terletskyi of Lutsk as his deputy – exarch of the Metropolis of Kiev.

Immediately after the patriarch's departure, Bishop Hedeon Balaban of Lviv began negotiations with Polish Bishop Solikowski on the union. Other bishops joined the process. However, Balaban later abandoned the idea of a union.

=== Separation ===
==== Union of Brest ====
In December 1594, Bishop Terletskyi, on behalf of the Ukrainian episcopate, announced that the Orthodox Church intended to unite with the Catholic Church, provided that the Byzantine Rite and the ancient rights of the church were preserved.

In December 1595, representatives of the Ukrainian Church in Rome signed terms of union with the Catholic Church. According to them, the Byzantine rite, Julian calendar, the right to elect a metropolitan and bishops, the Orthodox church calendar, the lower clergy had the right to marry, and so on.On 6 October 1596, in Brest, Metropolitan Rogoza convened a council attended by bishops, archimandrites, priests and laity. The Union of Brest was proclaimed at the cathedral. Most of the bishops, led by Metropolitan Michael Rohoza, and the Ukrainian nobility supported the union. On the other hand, many priests, monasteries, Cossacks and burghers opposed the union. Immediately after the council, Metropolitan Rogoza deprived Bishop Gedeon Balaban of Lviv and Mykhailo Kopystensky of Przemyśl, who opposed the union, of the episcopal government. Prince Konstantin-Vasyl Ostrozky also did not support the union. In addition, the Lviv Brotherhood had a stauropegia and was directly subordinated to the Patriarch of Constantinople. Bishop Gedeon (Balaban) became the exarch of the patriarch for Orthodox Ukrainians. The Kievand Vilnius fraternities actively declared themselves, and Orthodox fraternities began to operate in Mogilev, Minsk, Lublin, Lutsk, and other cities. Most monasteries, including: Kiev-Pechersk, Vydubychi, Epiphany, St. The Trinity in Vilno, Pochaiv, and others also did not support the union.

But officially Kiev, Volodymyr-Volyn, Turoŭ-Pinsk, Lutsk, Chełm and Polatsk accepted the union. The Metropolitan of Kievfound itself almost without its own hierarchy. This situation continued until 1620, when the Orthodox hierarchy and the Metropolitan of Kievwere restored as part of the Ecumenical Patriarchate.

The desire to unite with the Holy See was realized in the Brest Union of 1596, concluded by Metropolitan of Kiev Mykhailo Ragoza and cemented by Pope Clement VIII. In Kyiv there was only a unified Metropolitan of Kiev from 1596 to 1620. In the 17th century, the Kiev union metropolitans were Michael Rohoza (1596–1599), Hypatius Potii (1599–1614), Josyf Veliamyn Rutskyi (1614–1637), Rafail Korsak (1637–1642), and Antin Sielava (1642–1699), Havryil Kolenda (1655–1674), Kyprian Zokhovskyi (1674–1693), Lev I Sliubych-Zalenskyi (1694–1708).

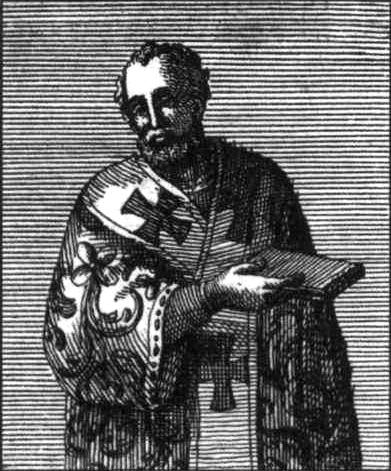
Michael Rohoza, Metropolitan of Kyiv, Galicia and All Rus

At the beginning of the 17th century, the Kiev Union Metropolis consisted of nine dioceses:

- Archdiocese of Kiev,
- Archdiocese of Polatsk,
- Archdiocese of Smolensk,
- Diocese of Turoŭ–Pinsk,
- Diocese of Bieraście–Vladimir,
- Diocese of Chełm–Belz
- Diocese of Przemyśl-Sambir-Sanok (adopted the union in 1692),
- Diocese of Lviv-Halych-Kamianets (adopted the union in 1700),
- Diocese of Lutsk–Ostroh (adopted the union in 1702).

After the church council in Uzhhorod in 1646, part of the Orthodox clergy in Transcarpathia also accepted the union with Rome, but left the jurisdiction of the Metropolitan of Metropolitan of Kiev, on 24 April 1646, in the chapel of Uzhhorod Castle, on the initiative of Basilian Bishop Vasyl Tarasovych, 63 priests testified to unity with the Catholic Church (Uzhhorod Union was concluded). In 1663 the conditions under which the Mukachevo diocese can be included in the Metropolitan of Kyiv were determined. However, due to the opposition of the widow of Ferenc II Rakoczi, the Diocese of Mukachevo was subordinated to the Hungarian Bishop of Jaeger.

In the 18th century, the main tasks of the union Metropolitans of Kiev were to defend the rights of the church from Latin influences and the Polish and Russian authorities. At the same time, the Ukrainian church began to play an increasingly active role in the Ukrainian national revival. The Zamoysky Synod (1720) was especially important in the design of the church's ceremonial, spiritual, and cultural face. From 1708 to 1838 there were eleven Kievan Catholic metropolitans, nine of whom bore the title of Kievan metropolitans, and the last two were considered papal legates to unite the faithful with Rome within the Russian Empire. As a result of the first partition of the Polish-Lithuanian Commonwealth (1772), the Kiev Union Metropolis was divided into three parts: the dioceses of Kiev, Volodymyr-Bieraście, Lutsk, Pinsk, and part of Chełm remained within the Polish-Lithuanian Commonwealth; the diocese of Polatsk was ceded to Russia, and the dioceses of Lviv, Przemyśl, and parts of the dioceses of Kamianets, Lutsk, and Kholm were ceded to Austria.

As a result of the second and third partition of the Polish-Lithuanian Commonwealth (1793, 1795) with the transition of most Ukrainian and Belarusian lands to the Russian Empire began constant persecution of the Union Church, which ended in 1839 through the act of Polatsk Cathedral its liquidation. Instead, the Union Church continued to exist only within the Austrian Empire, where in 1774, on the initiative of Empress Maria Theresa, it was renamed the Greek Catholic Church.

At the Lviv Pseudo-Council in 1946, the Soviet authorities subordinated the Greek Catholics to the Moscow Patriarchate. Under Soviet occupation, the Ukrainian Greek Catholic Church was brutally repressed, but continued to exist underground. In the late 1980s, during the perestroika of the USSR, the Ukrainian Greek Catholic Church and the Belarusian Greek Catholic Church were restored. After receiving the tomos on the autocephaly of the Orthodox Church of Ukraine, the idea of establishing Eucharistic communion between the PCU and the UGCC with the aim of further unification into a single Church of Ukraine began to emerge. However, Metropolitan Epiphanius of Kyiv noted that this is a "question of the future" and such unification will only depend on the general Orthodox-Catholic dialogue.

==== Orthodox metropolis ====
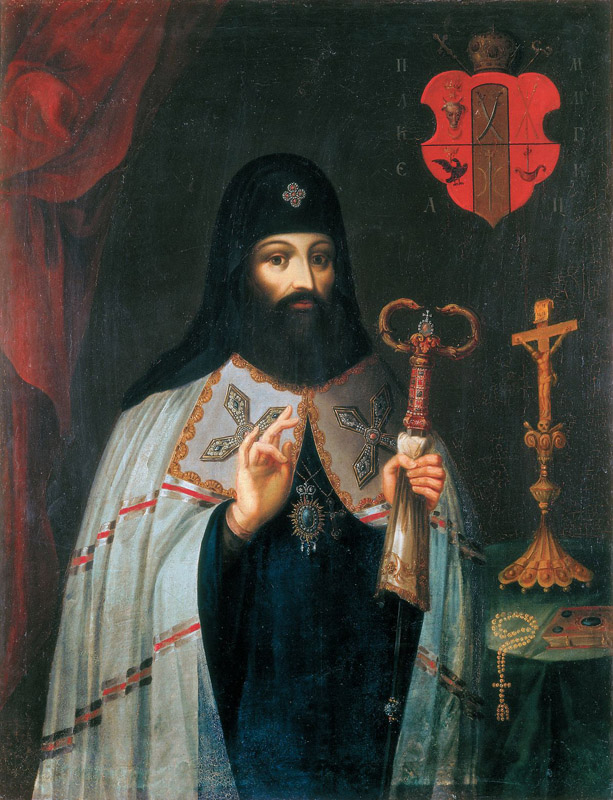
Saint Petro Mohyla

After the conclusion of the Union of Brest in 1596, a difficult religious situation developed in Ukraine. On the one hand, the majority of bishops, led by Metropolitan Michael Rohoza, and the Ukrainian nobility supported the union. On the other hand, many priests, monasteries, Cossacks and burghers opposed the union. Immediately after the council, Metropolitan Rogoza deprived Bishop Gedeon Balaban of Lviv and Mykhailo Kopystensky of Przemyśl, who opposed the union, of the episcopal government. However, in fact, they remained in their cathedrals under the protection of the Cossacks, fraternities and under the tutelage of Prince Ostrozkyi.

In 1620, thanks to the demands of the Ukrainian Cossacks, led by Hetman Petro Sahaidachnyi, the Orthodox hierarchy was restored in Ukraine. Job Boretskyi (1620–1631) became the Metropolitan of Kiev. The Metropolis of Kiev was recognized by the government of the Polish-Lithuanian Commonwealth in 1632. The Orthodox Metropolitans of Kiev of the 17th century were Isaiah Kopynskyi (1631–1633), Petro Mohyla (1633–1647), Sylvester Kosiv (1647–1657), Dionysius Balaban (1657–1663), and J. Tukalskyi-Nelkubovych (1663–1675). From 1675 to 1685 the archbishop of Chernihiv, L. Baranovych, was the mayor of the metropolitan Kiev Cathedral.

With the arrival of Peter Molyga on the metropolitan throne, the development of the church began. The development of schools began and the Kiev-Mohyla Academy was founded as well as printing and culture developed. Monastic life was raised to a new level, Orthodox fraternities received significant support, old ones were restored and new churches, cathedrals and monasteries were built. In particular, St. Sophia Cathedral was rebuilt and excavations of the Tithe Church were conducted, where the relics of St. Volodymyr the Great were found. Attempts to continue the dialogue with the Greek Catholic Church and the Holy See continued. Together with Metropolitan Josyf Veliamin Rutskyi, the clergy of both denominations came up with a plan to establish the Ukrainian Patriarchate. However, due to a number of subjective and objective reasons, this plan was not implemented.

In 1647, Sylvester Kosiv was elected Metropolitan of Kiev, Halych and All Rus. Neither the Cossacks nor the bishops appealed to the king for permission to choose a metropolitan, but directly received blessings from the Ecumenical Patriarch of Constantinople. Peter Mohyla's comrade and ally, the new metropolitan, tried to continue the affairs of his predecessor at this difficult time. According to the Treaty of Zboriv (1649), the Orthodox Church was granted significant rights. And the Ukrainian Orthodox metropolitan was to take second place in the Sejm of the Rzeczpospolita, after the Catholic primate. However, despite the Sejm's approval of this agreement, it was not implemented due to the continuation of hostilities. The defeat of the Cossack army near Berestechko led to the signing in 1651 of the Treaty of Bila Tserkva, much worse than the previous one.

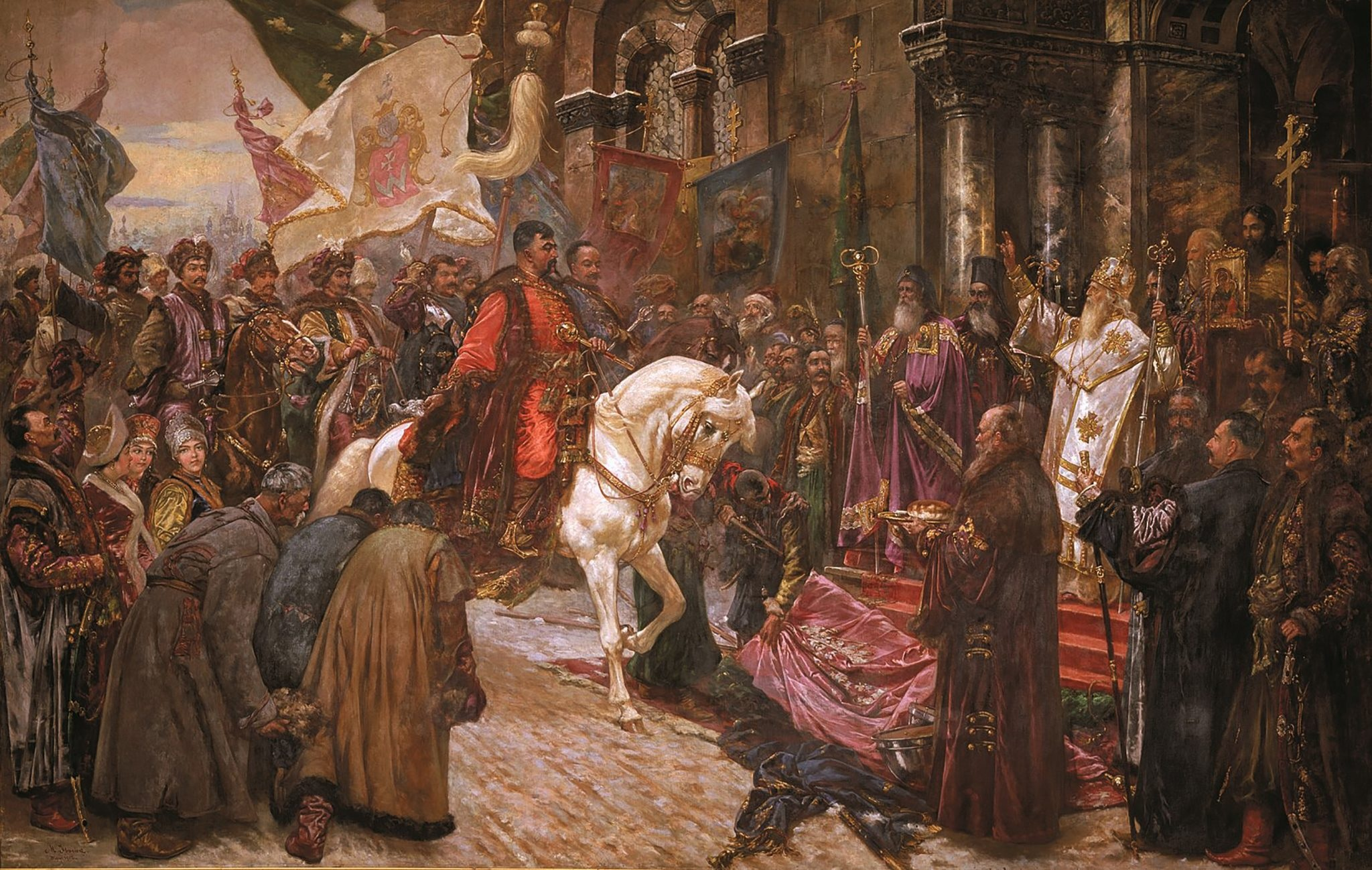
Entrance of Khmelnytskyi to Kyiv

After that, Khmelnytskyi began to conduct active negotiations with representatives of the Moscow tsar. However, from the very beginning of the negotiations, Moscow gave a special place to the subordination of the Ukrainian church to itself. Moscow viewed the Pereiaslav agreement not only as a political but also as a religious union, and began measures to gain full control of the Metropolis of Kiev. Despite the insistence of Moscow representatives, the hetman did not include in the Pereiaslav Treaty on the subordination of the Metropolis of Kiev to the Moscow patriarch. In addition, the higher Ukrainian Orthodox clergy were wary of the new treaty and rapprochement with Moscow. Referring to their duties before the Ecumenical Patriarch of Constantinople, Metropolitan Kosiv and the bishops present at the council refused to swear allegiance to the Tsar of Moscow. But Moscow officials continued to pursue their policies. On the day of the arrival of the tsar's envoy Buturlin to Kiev, 16 January 1654, Metropolitan Kosiv conducted a prayer service in St. Sophia Cathedral. After the prayer, Buturlin reproachfully asked the metropolitan why he "never beat or wrote to His Tsarist Majesty's forehead about the accession of Ukraine, and did not seek His royal mercy for himself."

The Moscow patriarch accepted the title of "patriarch of Greater, Lesser and White Rus." The Moscow churches held a service so that "the throne of Kyiv would unite with the God-ordained throne of Moscow," and the Moscow voivodes began to establish their order in Ukrainian cities. After all these events, not only the Ukrainian Orthodox clergy, but also the Cossack officers and the hetman began to reconsider their relations with Moscow. After the death of Metropolitan Kosiv in April 1657, Khmelnytskyi did not inform the tsar about the dismissal of the metropolitan chair, but appointed Lazar Baranovych, Bishop of Chernihiv, as the temporary vicar of the metropolis, and appointed the election of a new metropolitan for August 15. But on 27 July 1657, Hetman Bohdan Khmelnytskyi died.

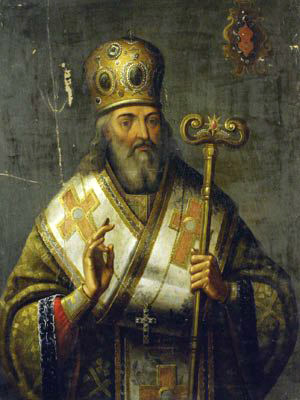
Dionysius Balaban, Metropolitan of Kyiv

Immediately after Bohdan Khmelnytsky's death, the Moscow voivodes began to send ambassadors to the church hierarchs, Ivan Vyhovsky, and the Cossack officers, so that they would not elect a metropolitan without the "blessing" of the Moscow patriarch. However, there were still few Moscow troops in Ukraine, and the pressure was unsuccessful, so the election of the Metropolitan of Kiev will take place under ancient Ukrainian rights, not by tsarist order. On 6 December 1657, Bishop Dionysius Balaban of Lutsk was elected Metropolitan of Kiev, Halych, and All Russia. But even after that, Moscow pressured Vyhovsky not to send to Constantinople for approval at the metropolis of the elected Dionysius, but to approve him as king. To which they were told that from the beginning of the holy baptism the Kievan metropolitans had received blessings from the Patriarch of Constantinople. In 1659 a "renewed" Pereyaslav agreement was signed under the new Hetman, Yuri Khmelnytsky. Prince Trubetskoy, taking advantage of the struggle for power among the Cossack officers and the absence of the Ukrainian Orthodox hierarchy at the Second Pereyaslav Council (there was only the Moscovite Archpriest M. Fylymonovych of Nizhny Novgorod), included a paragraph: the Patriarch of Moscow and All Great and Small and White Russia; and in the spiritual rights of St. the patriarch will not enter. " On this basis, Prince Trubetskoy appointed Bishop Lazar Baranovych mayor of the Metropolis of Kiev. Bishop Methodius received a special order from Moscow to influence the mood of Ukraine and incline it to Moscow; to perform this task better, Methodius was generously given money and a "sable treasury." However, neither the clergy nor the elders recognized Methodius. Hetman Ivan Somko strongly opposed him. The higher clergy loudly said that Methodius "lied" to himself in the king's episcopate, having no church merit.

Metropolitan Dionysius Balaban of Kiev removed Methodius from office as a foreign diocese, and appointed Joseph Tukalsky Bishop of Mstislavl. The Ecumenical Patriarch anathematized Methodius for ascending the throne of the Metropolis of Kyiv with the help of secular authorities. The consequence of all this was that even in left-bank Ukraine he was not recognized, but continued to be considered his metropolitan Dionysius.

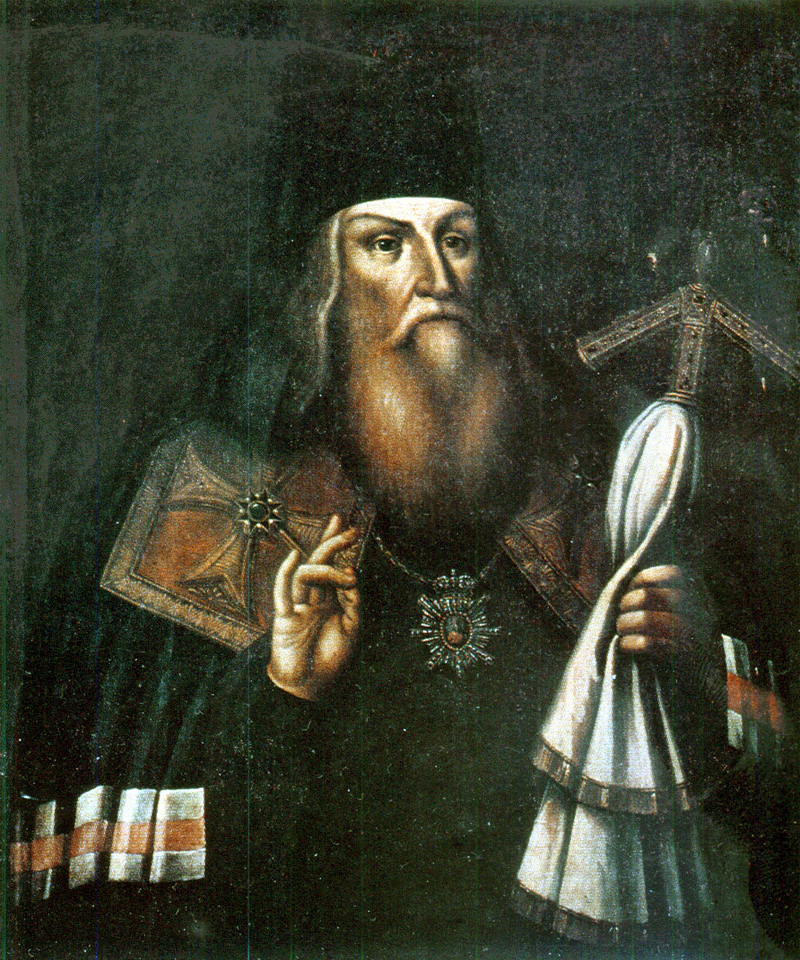
Lazar Baranovych, Bishop of Chernihiv

On 10 May 1663, Metropolitan Dionysius died. His successor was Joseph Neliubovych-Tukalskyi. However, he was not recognized in the territory under Moscow's rule. Moreover, the higher Kiev clergy and the acting hetman Somko wanted to appoint Metropolitan Baranovych. But Moscow again appointed a vicar – Methodius, from whom, at the request of Moscow, was removed even the anathema of the Patriarch of Constantinople. After that, the Black Council of 1663 took place, at which the pro-Moscow Ivan Bryukhovetsky became the hetman. Meanwhile, two Orthodox metropolitans were elected on the Right Bank: Bishop Yosyp Tukalsky-Nelyubovych and Bishop Anthony Vynnytsky. At the same time, both candidates were approved by the king. As Vynnytsky was supported by Hetman Pavlo Teteria, the Polish-Lithuanian Commonwealth imprisoned Tukalsky, where he stayed from 1664 to 1666.

The last attempt to unite the Metropolis of Kiev into a single entity was made after Petro Doroshenko became hetman of left-bank Ukraine and united the two shores. Joseph (Nelyubovych-Tukalsky) ascended the Metropolitan of Kiev throne, elected metropolitan in 1663 at the Cathedral in Uman and confirmed in this title by the King of the Polish–Lithuanian Commonwealth. Metropolitan Joseph advocated the preservation of the canonical connection with Constantinople. Therefore, arriving in Kyiv, he ordered to stop the commemoration in the churches of Tsar Alexis I The Quietest and to commemorate only Hetman Petro. Joseph removed the mantle and panagia from Bishop Methodius (Fylymonovych) and sent him to the Uman Monastery. During the reign of Metropolitan Joseph, attempts to transfer the Metropolis of Kiev to Moscow's jurisdiction were unsuccessful.

Metropolitan Joseph died on 26 July 1675. Since then, Lazar Baranovych, who is not recognized on the Right Bank, has become the vicar again. The metropolitan throne remained vacant until 1685.

=== Annexation of the Metropolis of Kyiv by the Moscow Patriarchate ===
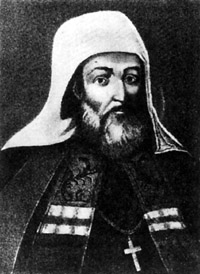
Gedeon Sviatopolk-Chetvertynskyi

After the victory over Hetman Petro Doroshenko, and the final occupation of left-bank Ukraine and Kiev, the Moscow authorities began to take decisive action to completely transfer the Metropolis of Kiev to the Moscow Patriarchate. After Tukalsky's death, Baranovych, who had been his metropolitan vicar in Kiev until 1685, was reappointed metropolitan.

In 1685 Gedeon Sviatopolk-Chetvertinskyi (1685–90) became a metropolitan, was ordained in Moscow by Patriarch Joachim of Moscow, and took an oath of allegiance to the Moscow Patriarchate against church canons. Since 1688 it has been forbidden to use the title "Metropolitan of Kiev, Halych and All Rus".

In June, the Council of Bishops was convened in Constantinople, at which a final decision was made on this issue. The Council issued a letter ordering the recognition of Gedeon (Sviatopolk-Chetvertynsky) as the legitimate Metropolitan of Kiev. In addition to Patriarch Dionysius, the letter was also signed by 21 metropolitans. In addition, Dionysius in June issued two more letters addressed to Hetman Samoilovych and all the faithful children of the Metropolis of Kiev, in which he said that he gave the right to deliver the Metropolitan of Kiev and All Ukraine to the Moscow Patriarch, and ordered from now on to send all newly elected metropolitans for consecration. The Metropolitan of Kiev had to be the first to mention the name in the diptych of the Patriarch of Constantinople, so that it would be a testimony to the authority of the Ecumenical Throne over the Metropolis of Kiev. Nikita Alekseev presented Patriarch Dionysius with 200 gold and "three forty sables" for these documents, for which he received a handwritten receipt from Dionysius. It is noteworthy that in his letter to the Moscow tsars, the patriarch of Constantinople asked to send a "salary" for the other bishops who signed the act. In the spring of 1686, when the Moscow ambassadors were in the Ottoman Empire, negotiations were already underway in Moscow with the personal representatives of the King of the Polish-Lithuanian Commonwealth for the signing of a peace treaty. "Treaty of Perpetual Peace" with the Polish-Lithuanian Commonwealth was concluded on April 21. Moscow undertook to break the peace with the Ottoman sultan and the Crimean khan and immediately send troops to the Crimean crossings to protect the Polish-Lithuanian Commonwealth from Tatar attacks. The Polish-Lithuanian Commonwealth government, for its part, guaranteed that the Orthodox population in the Polish-Lithuanian Commonwealth could not be forced into Greek Catholicism, and that the higher Orthodox clergy would be ordained by the Metropolitan of Kiev. However, this agreement could enter into force only after its signing by the King of the Polish-Lithuanian Commonwealth. As Jan Sobieski was on a military campaign in the Principality of Moldavia at that time, the treaty was confirmed by him only in the autumn of 1686. At the same time, Moscow decided to organize a military campaign against the Crimean Khan, an ally of the Ottoman Empire. This actual declaration of war on the Ottoman Empire almost crossed out the results of the mission of deacon Nikita Alekseev. On the way back from Constantinople, the Moscow ambassador, along with his diplomas, was arrested while passing through the Crimea. The Moscow government barely managed to release him by sending an important Tatar prisoner to the Crimean khan in exchange. As soon as Constantinople learned of Moscow's conclusion of an "eternal peace" with the Polish-Lithuanian Commonwealth, the position of Patriarch Dionysius became extremely unenviable. Opposition in the Synod immediately formed against him. Dissatisfied with Dionysius, the bishops accused him of secret ties with Moscow, citing the transfer of the Metropolis of Kiev to the Moscow patriarch. As a result, Dionysius lost his patriarchate two months after his official accession to the throne of Constantinople. In 1687, the Council of Constantinople condemned Patriarch Dionysius for the transfer of the Metropolis of Kiev to Moscow, assessing this act as simony, i.e. bribery, and deprived Dionysius of the patriarchal throne. Thus, the action of Patriarch Dionysius was declared illegal by the council.

In 1721, according to the "Spiritual Regulations", the Metropolis of Kiev was formally liquidated as an autonomous ecclesiastical region and became an ordinary diocese of the Moscow Patriarchate. From 1722 to 1743, the title of metropolitan was taken away from the Metropolitan of Kiev, and they remained only archbishops. Under Catherine the Great in 1770, the words and Little Rus were removed from the title Metropolitan of Kiev, Galicia and Little Rus. If in the 18th century most of the Kiev archbishops were of Ukrainian origin, then in the 19th century they were mostly Russians.

In 1727, when the hetmanate was restored during the reign of Peter II, Barlaam Vanatovych began to seek the renewal of the title of metropolitan and voiced protests by the Ukrainian clergy against the violation of the rights and privileges of the Church of Ukraine. In 1727, the Russian Synod, contrary to all the promised privileges given to the Metropolis of Kiev, appointed the Moscovite Joachim Strukov to the Pereiaslav Cathedral. He was ordained in St. Petersburg, without the participation of the Metropolitan of Kiev in his election and approval. On August 2, 1730, the archbishop and the cathedral were summoned to Moscow, where they were all arrested, stripped of their titles, and sentenced to life in exile.

In 1731, Raphael Zaborovsky succeeded Barlaam Vonatovych, who in 1742 was awarded the title of Metropolitan. In 1748, Tymofiy Shcherbatsky was appointed the new metropolitan. The functions and rights of the metropolitan were very limited, so Timothy focused on the development of the Kyiv Academy and the restoration of the printing house at the Kiev-Pechersk Lavra. But he, outraged by Moscow's interference in the smallest affairs of the metropolis, in 1757 wrote a letter to the Synod requesting his dismissal from the metropolitan chair. Under the new metropolitan, Arseniy of Mohyla, the right of the Metropolitan of Kiev was even more limited. In 1767, during the reign of Arseniy, elections were held to the "Commission for New Laws". Her orders to the clergy demanded that the Ukrainian Church be restored to its old rights. Of course, these appeals made a negative impression on Empress Catherine II. An important step in preparing the imperial government for the complete enslavement of Ukraine was the General Description of 1765–1769. At the same time, the policy of active Russification of Ukraine and cultural assimilation of the Ukrainian people continued. Russian imperialism relied on the support of the Russian clergy. At the same time, despite subordination to the Russian Orthodox Church and the Synod, the Ukrainian dioceses still retained some peculiarities in organization and church rites. In 1770, the synod forbade the use of the title "Metropolitan of Kyiv, Halych and Little Russia", and only allowed "Metropolitan of Kiev and Halych".

The next step was the secularization of church wealth. At that time, the Ukrainian church owned huge estates, at the expense of which monasteries carried out extensive cultural and educational work, maintained schools, hospitals, and helped the needy. In the mid-1760s, Catherine II aimed to take away these lands, but was met with strong resistance from the clergy. However, she did not give up her plan.

In the 1780s, more favorable conditions were created for the implementation of this plan, and on April 10, 1786, the empress issued a decree on the secularization of monastic and ecclesiastical lands, as a result of which 46 monasteries were closed. Metropolitan Gavriil Kremenetsky (1770–1783) systematically pursued a centralizing policy in the Ukrainian Church. Not only that, when in 1775, after the destruction of the Zaporozhian Sich, the Kherson eparchy (subordinated to the synod) was formed, a part of the Metropolis of Kiev was annexed to it.

Less than a hundred years later (1685–1783), the Ukrainian Church was transferred from its autonomous status within the Ecumenical Patriarchate of Constantinople to the despotic centralized power of the Moscow clergy. From 1721, power in the church passed to the emperor. The Synod elected candidates for metropolitan, and approved them by the emperor. In addition, for 60 years, this civil power belonged to the empresses Catherine I, Anne, Elizabeth, and Catherine II. Thus the imperial Orthodox Church was ruled by women.

By purposeful actions of the Russian government, Ukrainian Orthodoxy gradually lost its connection with the Ukrainian people, Ukrainian culture and literature. Even in the first half of the 18th century. The Russian government demanded that books be published in Ukraine only in strict accordance with Russian texts. This policy lasted until 1917. In the Ukrainian Orthodox Trebnik of 1695, there were none of the saints that were added to the Moscow lunar calendar as Moscow saints. Only in 1784 were all Ukrainian churches ordered to accept the Russian Lunar Dictionary. Ukrainian worship was translated into Moscow, Ukrainian theological and church books were banned.

However, Ukrainians in no way wanted to renounce the original faith and rites of their ancestors. Thus, the relic of Peter the Great contained up to forty rites, which were not in the relic of the Moscow press. And the Kiev printing house continued to publish its old books, even despite the ban of the imperial government. Then the decrees of the Synod of 1766 and 1775 ordered the Pechersk printing house to print and sell only those books that were printed in the Moscow printing house. Archimandrite of the Kiev-Pechersk Lavra Zosima Valkevych in 1769 asked the Synod for permission to print Ukrainian primers, because the people do not understand Russian and do not want to buy them. However, the Synod not only did not allow, but ordered to take back the primers that were already on hand. The situation was similar in education. All lectures, without exception, have been taught in Russian at the Kyiv-Mohyla Academy since 1784. The same was introduced in all schools in Ukraine. 1800 – The Moscow Synod issues a decree banning the construction of Ukrainian Baroque churches. In 1810 the Kiev-Mohyla Academy is closed and the Theological Academy is established in its place, which finally ceases to be the center of Ukrainian spiritual life.

Ukrainian national church historiography has always denied the transfer of the Metropolis of Kiev under the omophorion of the Russian Orthodox Church.

=== Modern times ===
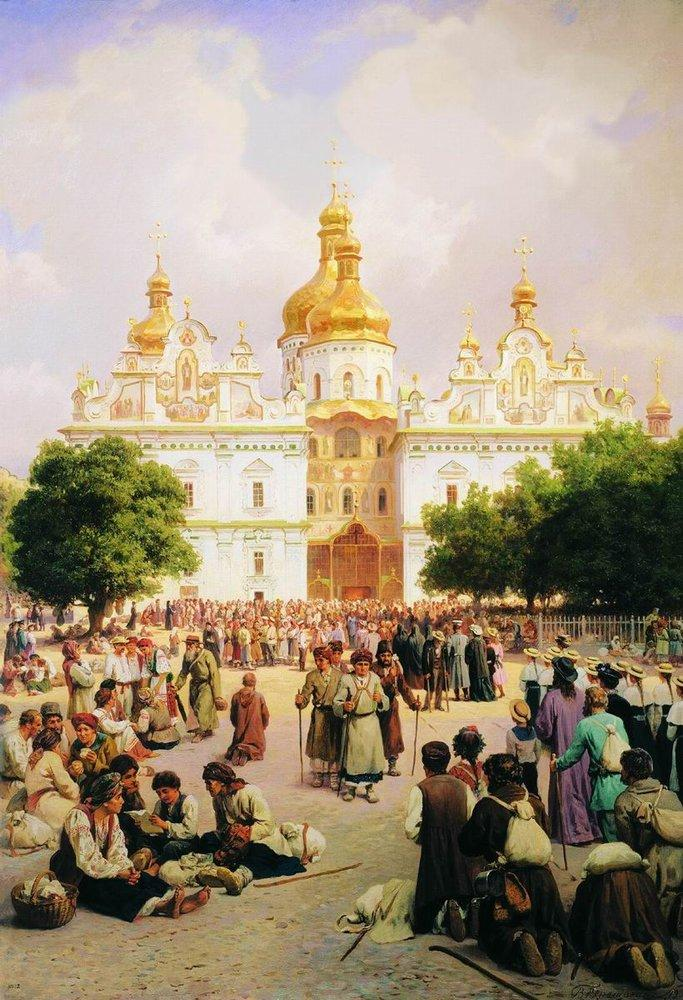
Holy Dormition Cathedral of the Kyiv-Pechersk Monastery.

After the revolution of 1917, several Orthodox churches were established, which considered themselves the heirs of the Metropolis of Kiev. In 1918, the Ukrainian cathedral was given autonomy at the local cathedral. The Ukrainian Autonomous Orthodox Church as part of the Russian Church existed until 1921, from 1921 to 1990 it was the Ukrainian Exarchate like the Belarusian Exarchate. On October 27, 1990, the Council of Bishops of the Moscow Patriarchate, held on October 25–27, abolished the Ukrainian Exarchate and re-established the autonomous and independent Ukrainian Orthodox Church.

From 1924 to 1946, the Renewal Autocephalous Ukrainian Synodal Church operated.

From 1919 to 1937 there was the Ukrainian Autocephalous Orthodox Church, which, however, did not even have canonically appointed bishops, which is why it was called "self-consecration".

From 1942 to 1944, the Ukrainian Autocephalous Orthodox Church operated in Ukraine as the archdiocese of the Polish Autocephalous Orthodox Church and the Ukrainian Autonomous Orthodox Church.

In the 20th century, the Ecumenical Patriarchate repeatedly criticized the events of 1686. In 1924, Ecumenical Patriarch Gregory VII gave the Polish Autocephalous Orthodox Church a tomos on autocephaly, citing the fact that the accession of the Metropolis of Kiev to the Moscow Patriarchate was not carried out according to church canons. So in 1924 in the tomos of Patriarch Gregory VII on the gift of autocephaly to the Polish Orthodox Church where it is said that autocephaly is granted:

listening to the loud voice of the canonical duty that imposes on our Holy Ecumenical Throne the care of the Holy Orthodox Churches in need; seeing that history also testifies in favor of the above (for it is written that the alienation from our Throne of the Metropolis of Kyiv and the Orthodox Churches of Lithuania and Poland dependent on it, as well as their affiliation to the Holy Church of Moscow, from the very beginning were not in agreement with legitimate canonical precepts, also failed to comply with what was jointly stated about the full ecclesiastical self-sufficiency of the Metropolitan of Kyiv, who bore the title of Exarch of the Ecumenical Throne).

Patriarch Gregory VII named three grounds that allowed him to grant autocephaly to the Orthodox Church within the Second Polish Republic. They were, firstly, the need to reconcile church borders with new political borders, secondly, the right of the Patriarchal See of Constantinople to provide support to the Orthodox churches "in difficulty" and, thirdly, the violation of canonical rules committed in 1686 (Orthodox the dioceses of Second Polish Republic, Lithuania, and Belarus in 1686 were part of the Metropolis of Kiev ). However, the act of 1686 was not annulled by Patriarch Gregory. On the territory of Ukraine, he still recognized the legal jurisdiction of the Moscow Patriarch.

In 1990, Ecumenical Patriarch Demetrius wrote in a letter to the Moscow Patriarch that the Church of Constantinople recognized the Russian Orthodox Church in 1589. On the same grounds, a tomos on autocephaly was given to the Orthodox Church of Ukraine in 2019. That is, the act of "transfer" of the Metropolis of Kyiv Dionysius was not recognized by the Patriarchate of Constantinople.

On February 15, 1989, with the support of pro-Ukrainian forces, an initiative committee for the restoration of the Ukrainian Autocephalous Orthodox Church in Ukraine began operating in Kyiv. Its main goal was the revival of the UAOC and the registration of Church communities. After Archpriest Volodymyr Yarema, the rector of the Lviv Church of Peter and Paul, left the jurisdiction of the Moscow Patriarchate together with his parish on August 19, 1989, the autocephalous movement began to gain momentum. During services in the parishes of the Ukrainian Autocephalous Orthodox Church, it was customary to commemorate the then Ecumenical Patriarch Demetrius.

On June 5–6, 1990, the All-Ukrainian Orthodox Council was held in Kyiv with the participation of about 700 delegates from all over Ukraine, including 7 bishops and more than 200 priests. The Council approved the restoration of the UAOC and elected Mstislav (Skrypnyk) Patriarch of Kyiv. The Statute of the Church was also adopted. Metropolitan Mstislav himself was absent from this council, and did not accept his election as Patriarch immediately. Metropolitan Ivan (Bodnarchuk) became the vicar of the patriarchal throne in Kyiv at that time. On October 2, 1990, the authorities of the Ukrainian Soviet Socialist Republic officially registered the Ukrainian Autocephalous Orthodox Church.

In 1992, Metropolitan of Kyiv and All Ukraine Filaret was removed from office by the UOC Council of Bishops (in his absence) and elected a new head of the UOC (MP), Volodymyr Sabodan, who was then Metropolitan of Rostov and Novocherkask (ROC). In 1997, at the request of the UOC (MP) episcopate, the ROC Council of Bishops issued an "Act of Excommunication of the Monk Filaret (Denisenko)" for "divisive activity" (demanding that the Moscow Patriarchate grant autocephaly to the UOC). In June 1992, the Ukrainian Orthodox Church of the Kyiv Patriarchate was established by merging a part of the Ukrainian Orthodox Church of the Moscow Patriarchate, headed by Metropolitan of Kyiv Filaret, and a part of the Ukrainian Autocephalous Orthodox Church.

The statement made in March 2005 by reigning Archbishop of the Western Diocese of the Ukrainian Orthodox Church in the United States Vsevolod of Skopel (Maidan), who was rightly considered the curator of the "Ukrainian policy" of the Patriarchate of Constantinople, had a great resonance. At a meeting with President Viktor Yushchenko, he said that the Patriarchate of Constantinople had never recognized the legitimacy of the transition of the Metropolis of Kyiv to the Moscow Patriarchate, and therefore Constantinople continues to consider Ukraine its canonical territory to this day. This statement provoked strong protests from the Russian Orthodox Church, but Constantinople did not officially deny (as well as confirm) anything.

During the reign of Metropolitan Methodius, he advocated the unification of the Orthodox Churches of Ukraine into a single local Church. According to his Spiritual Covenant, this must take place exclusively with the blessing of the Ecumenical Patriarch. Metropolitan Methodius believed that the main obstacle to the unification of the Orthodox Churches in Ukraine into a single local church was the identity of UOC-KP Patriarch Filaret, who did not agree to unite without guarantees that he would personally keep the patriarchal puppet.

Thus, in 2008, during negotiations on overcoming canonical isolation, representatives of the Ecumenical Patriarchate offered the UOC-KP the following conditions:

- temporary renunciation of the status of patriarchy;
- entering the jurisdiction of the Ecumenical Patriarchate as the Metropolis of Kyiv in order to obtain a tomos on autocephaly in the future;
- formation of canonical governing bodies of the Ukrainian Church in the jurisdiction of the Ecumenical Patriarchate with the blessing of the Ecumenical Patriarch (in particular, the election of the Primate of the Church as an act of the Ecumenical Patriarch from three alternative candidates nominated by the Ukrainian episcopate).

This model was proposed only as a transition to the final canonical independence of the Ukrainian Church — the publication of a tomos on autocephaly. During the negotiations, the Ukrainian side had a real opportunity to significantly optimize the model of canonical legitimization of the UOC-KP and UAOC. However, for this the Ukrainian side also had to go to a meeting in Constantinople, namely to agree that the head of the Ukrainian church in the Ecumenical Patriarchate will be elected Ecumenical Patriarch from the three candidates proposed by the Ukrainian episcopate. The UAOC agreed to refrain from nominating its own candidates. Thus, the UOC-KP had the opportunity to nominate Patriarch Filaret and two other candidates from the episcopate of the UOC-KP. But this option was rejected.

On the 40th day after the death of His Beatitude Methodius, his Spiritual Testament was published, emphasizing the continuation of the UAOC's long course of establishing communion with the Ecumenical Patriarchate. His Beatitude also ordered to continue the dialogue with the Episcopate of the Ukrainian Orthodox Church of the Kyiv Patriarchate and the Ukrainian-centric part of the Episcopate of the Ukrainian Orthodox Church (Moscow Patriarchate) led by Metropolitan Oleksandr Drabynko on unification into a single local on merging with other Orthodox jurisdictions in Ukraine without the canonical blessing of Ecumenical Patriarch Bartholomew I.

As the vicar of the Metropolitan of Kyiv throne, Metropolitan Macarius Maletych clearly stated his desire to unite the UAOC with the UOC-KP. After his election as the Primate of the Ukrainian Autocephalous Orthodox Church, he also stated that he was ready to go "to Onuphrius and bow at his feet so that he would move away from Moscow" to establish a Local Church.

In 2008, during the jubilee celebrations dedicated to the 1020th anniversary of the Baptism of Kievan Rus, Ecumenical Patriarch Bartholomew I repeatedly named the Patriarchate of Constantinople the Mother Church in relation to the Ukrainian Orthodox Church of the Moscow Patriarchate. And on July 26, 2008, in his program address to the Ukrainian people, delivered on Sophia Square in Kyiv, Patriarch Bartholomew directly called the accession of the Metropolis of Kyiv to the Moscow Patriarchate an annexation. He stressed that his Church agreed to "limit itself" to promote the fuller use of the "spiritual heritage of Byzantium", as well as to protect the Orthodox identity of the Ukrainian people.

Patriarch Bartholomew put the events of 1686 on a par with the gift of autocephaly to a number of Local Churches in the Balkans: Greece, Serbia, and Albania.

==== Abolition of the Synodal Letter of 1686 ====
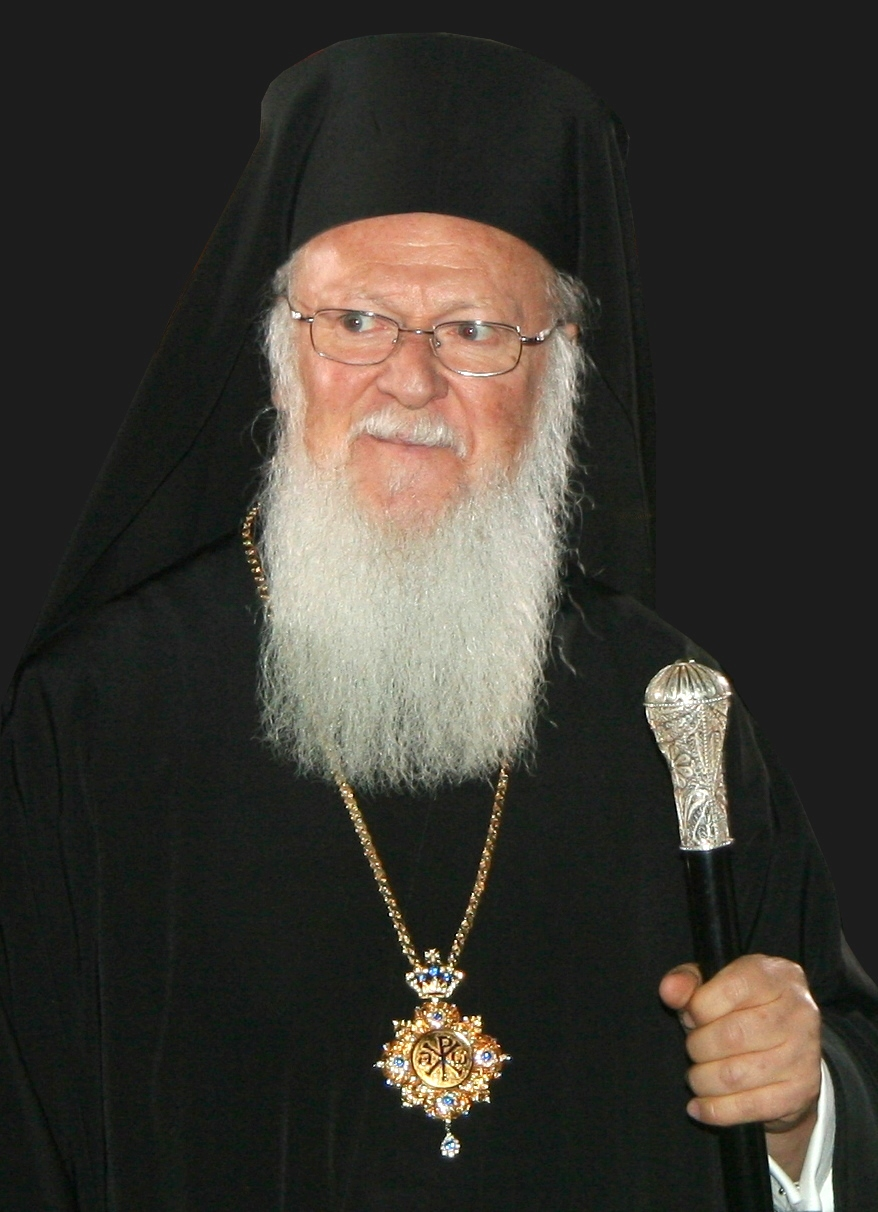
Ecumenical Patriarch Bartholomew I, who has the status Primus inter pares

The Synodal Letter of 1686 was never recognized by either the Ukrainian people or the Orthodox world, and that is why this so-called "accession" of the Metropolis of Kiev has always been considered the ecclesiastical annexation of Ukraine by Moscovy. Accordingly, on June 16, 2016, the Verkhovna Rada of Ukraine approved an appeal to Patriarch Bartholomew I of Constantinople to repeal the illegal Synodal Act of 1686 on the annexation of Ukraine by Moscovy and grant a tomos to the Ukrainian Orthodox Church recognizing the independence of the Ukrainian Church from Moscow. After a second address by the President of Ukraine Petro Poroshenko and the Verkhovna Rada of Ukraine on April 19, 2018, the Ecumenical Patriarchate began preparations for granting autocephaly to the Ukrainian Orthodox Church.

In 2018, the Ecumenical Patriarchate Bartholomew I publicly announced that "Constantinople never gave permission to transfer the canonical territories of the Metropolis of Kyiv to anyone except the right of ordination of the Metropolitan of Kyiv in Moscow under the conditions of his election in Kyiv at the local council». The Orthodox Church of Constantinople believes that the Moscow Patriarchate, which in 1686 was granted certain rights related to the administration of the Kyiv Orthodox Metropolis, violated them. On October 11, 2018, the Ecumenical Patriarchate, referring to the analysis of the situation by theological historians and canonists, declared the Letter of Dionysius IV of 1686 invalid and revoked all the rights granted to the Moscow Patriarchate in the past to administer the Metropolis of Kyiv.

On this basis and at the request of part of the Ukrainian Orthodox Church and the Ukrainian government in 2018, the Metropolis of Kyiv (formed from the clergy of the UOC-KP, UAOC and part of the UOC-MP) as part of the Metropolis of Kyiv of the Ecumenical Patriarchate was given a tomos on autocephaly. Ukraine, and was elected Primate Epiphanius with the title of Metropolitan of Kyiv and All Ukraine.

Prior to the election of the head of the Orthodox Church of Ukraine, Patriarch Bartholomew sent a letter to the Metropolitan of the ROC in Ukraine Onufrii (Berezovskyi): "In the form of austerity and mercy, we inform you that to bear the title of Metropolitan of Kyiv, which you still wear now in violation of the described conditions of official documents of 1686." This was reflected in the yearbook of the Patriarchate of Constantinople, published after the Orthodox Church of Ukraine received autocephaly: the bishops of the ROC in Ukraine are named in it only by reference to the place of residence; for example, Bishop Onufriy (Berezovsky) is no longer mentioned as the Metropolitan of Kyiv and All Ukraine, but is called "the Metropolitan of Kyiv." The entire episcopate of the ROC in Ukraine in the yearbook of the Ecumenical Patriarchate is included in the list of bishops of the Orthodox Church of Russia. Patriarch Bartholomew also met with Moscow Patriarch Kirill and said that "the Ecumenical Patriarchate has decided to use all means to resolve the issue of granting autocephaly to the Orthodox Church in Ukraine. The decision was made in April. And [Fanar] implements this decision "(according to the representative of Bartholomew, Metropolitan of Gaul Emanuel).

As part of the preparations for granting autocephaly to the Orthodox Church of Ukraine, the Patriarch of Everyday consistently argued that he had a canonical right to this decision. At the end of September 2018, the Ecumenical Patriarchate of Constantinople published a body of documents confirming that the connection of the Moscow Patriarchate with the territory of the historic Metropolis of Kyiv was based on the violation of Orthodox canon law.

In 2018, the Moscow Patriarchate reacted very painfully to the abolition of the Ecumenical Patriarchate's illegal charter of Dionysius IV in 1686 (and the related Synodal Letter of 1686) and refused to recognize this decision, continuing to unreasonably insist that the Russian Orthodox Church in Ukraine is the only canon.

On December 15, 2018, the Orthodox Church of Ukraine – the successor of the Metropolis of Kyiv – was established at the Unification Council. The Tomos on the Autocephaly of the Orthodox Church of Ukraine was handed over on January 5 and received on January 6, 2019, at Phanar, which meant full independence from the Ecumenical Patriarchate of Constantinople and from any other local autocephalous Eastern Orthodox Church. On January 31, 2019, the Metropolis of Kyiv of the Ukrainian Orthodox Church (Orthodox Church of Ukraine) was legally registered.

== Organization and structure ==
The Metropolis of Kyiv had autonomy within the Ecumenical Patriarchate of Constantinople. Saint Michael I is considered to be the first metropolitan of Kyiv and all of Rus. Under Grand Prince Volodymyr, in addition to Kyiv and Tmutorokan, there were Pereiaslav, Novgorod, and Chernihiv dioceses. Later there were Rostov, Vladimir, Belgorod, Polatsk, Turiv, Yuri (on the river Ros), and others. Chronicles show that at the beginning of the 11th century there were more than 100 churches in Kyiv. The Cathedral of the Assumption of the Blessed Virgin Mary (Tithe Church), built in 996, became the cathedral under Volodymyr the Great. The abbot of the Tithe Church was Bishop Nastas Korsunianin.

=== Primates ===
- List of metropolitans and patriarchs of Kyiv
- Metropolitan of Kyiv and All Ukraine

=== Diocese ===
The spiritual authority of the Metropolitan of Kyiv extended to all dioceses that were formed on the lands of Kievan Rus. On the eve of the Mongol-Tatar invasion there were 16 of them: Kyiv (988), Chernihiv (991), Belgorod (991), Vladimir (992), Novgorod (992), Rostov (992), Polatsk (992), Turiv (1005), Przemyśl (1026), Pereiaslav (1036), Yurii (1036), Galician (1134), Smolensk (1137), Riazan (1198), Suzdal (1213).

== See also ==
- Stauropegion of the Ecumenical Patriarchate in Ukraine
- 2018 Moscow–Constantinople schism
