= Lazar Baranovych =

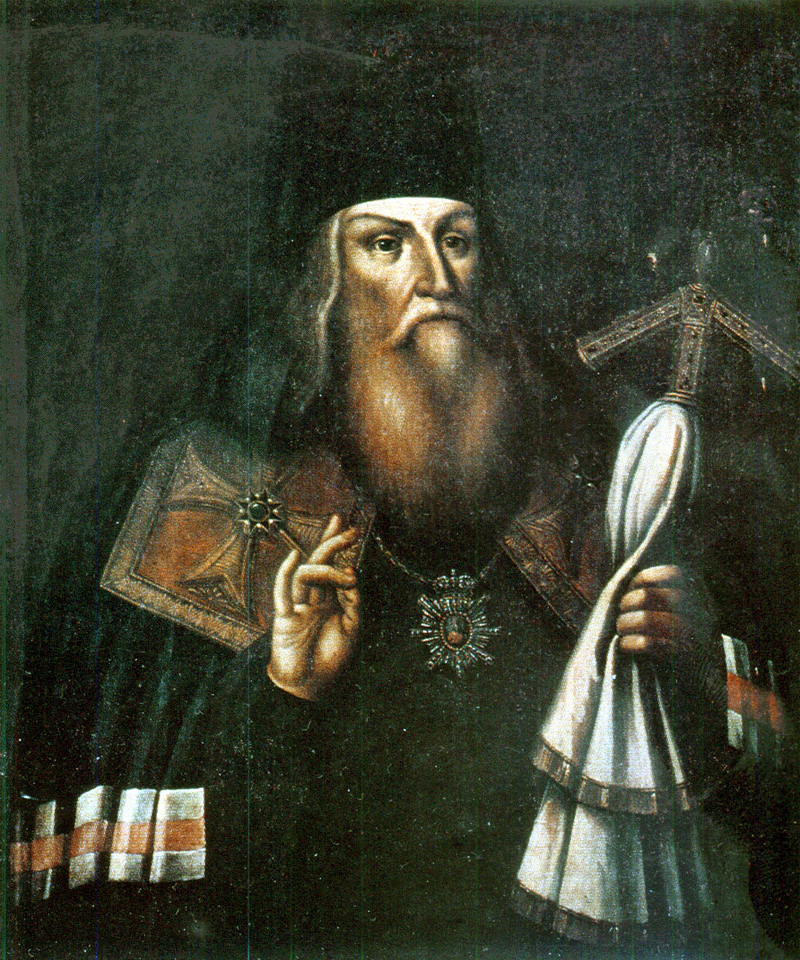
- Church: Ecumenical Patriarchate of Constantinople
- Metropolis: Metropolis of Kyiv
- Diocese: Chernihiv and Novhorod-Siverkyi
- See: Chernihiv
- Elected: 8 March 1657
- Retired: 1692
- Predecessor: Zosimas Prokopovych
- Successor: Theodosius Polonytskyi-Uhlytskyi

Orders
- Ordination: 8 March 1657 (bishop) by Gedeon of Suceava
- Rank: Archbishop (1667); Bishop (1657)

Personal details
- Born: Luka Vasylyovych Baranovych; 1620 Polish-Lithuanian Commonwealth
- Died: 13 September 1693 (aged 72–73) Chernihiv, Cossack Hetmanate, Muscovite State
- Buried: at Boris and Gleb Cathedral, Chernihiv
- Denomination: Eastern Orthodox
- Residence: Chernihiv
- Education: Wilno Theological Academy; Kalisz Jesuit Collegium

Lazar Baranovych or Baranovich (Ukrainian: Лазар Баранович, Russian: Лазарь Баранович, Polish: Łazarz Baranowicz; 1620 – 3 (13) September 1693 in Chernihiv, Cossack Hetmanate, Tsardom of Russia) was a Ruthenian Eastern Orthodox archbishop of the Polish–Lithuanian Commonwealth and then of the Tsardom of Russia. An ecclesiastical, political, and literary figure, his activities contributed to the development of cultural elite in Ukraine during the tenure of hetman Ivan Mazepa.

== Early life ==
Baranovych studied in Orthodox and Jesuit schools, and in 1650 was appointed professor of Kyiv-Mohyla Academy, serving as its rector.

== Ecclesiastical career ==
Baranovych served as Bishop of Chernihiv from 1657 onwards. In 1658, when the presence of Muscovite troops forced Kyiv Metropolitan Hedeon Balaban to move his episcopal seat to Chyhyryn, the government in Moscow appointed Baranovych in his place. On his position he founded schools and monasteries.

In 1661, Pitirim of Moscow, who at that time was the Metropolitan of Krutitsy and the deputy of the Patriarch of Moscow, ordained Methodius Fylymonovych as Bishop of Mstsislaw. Fylymonovych was later appointed as Baranovych's vicar in the Metropolis of Kyiv. In 1662, Patriarch Nikon of Moscow cursed Metropolitan Pitirim for this act. The Patriarch of Constantinople also pronounced anathema on Methodius. As a result, the Ukrainian clergy refused to obey the new vicar. This first attempt by Moscow to directly nominate a candidate for the throne in Kyiv resulted in failure.

In 1667, at a local Council in Moscow, a decision was made to elevate the Chernihiv diocese to an archdiocese with Lazar Baranovych as archbishop. However, since the decision was made without the consent of Constantinople, Patriarch Parthenius IV of Constantinople did not recognize its legitimacy. Baranovych may have assumed the title of "Metropolitan of Kyiv, Galicia and all Ruthenia" or locum tenens in pretence.

== Political views ==
While he supported the incorporation of left-bank Ukraine into the Tsardom of Russia, Baranovych also defended the independence of the Kyiv metropolis from the Patriarch of Moscow. Under the hetmanate of Ivan Mazepa he came to oppose Muscovite military presence in Ukraine.

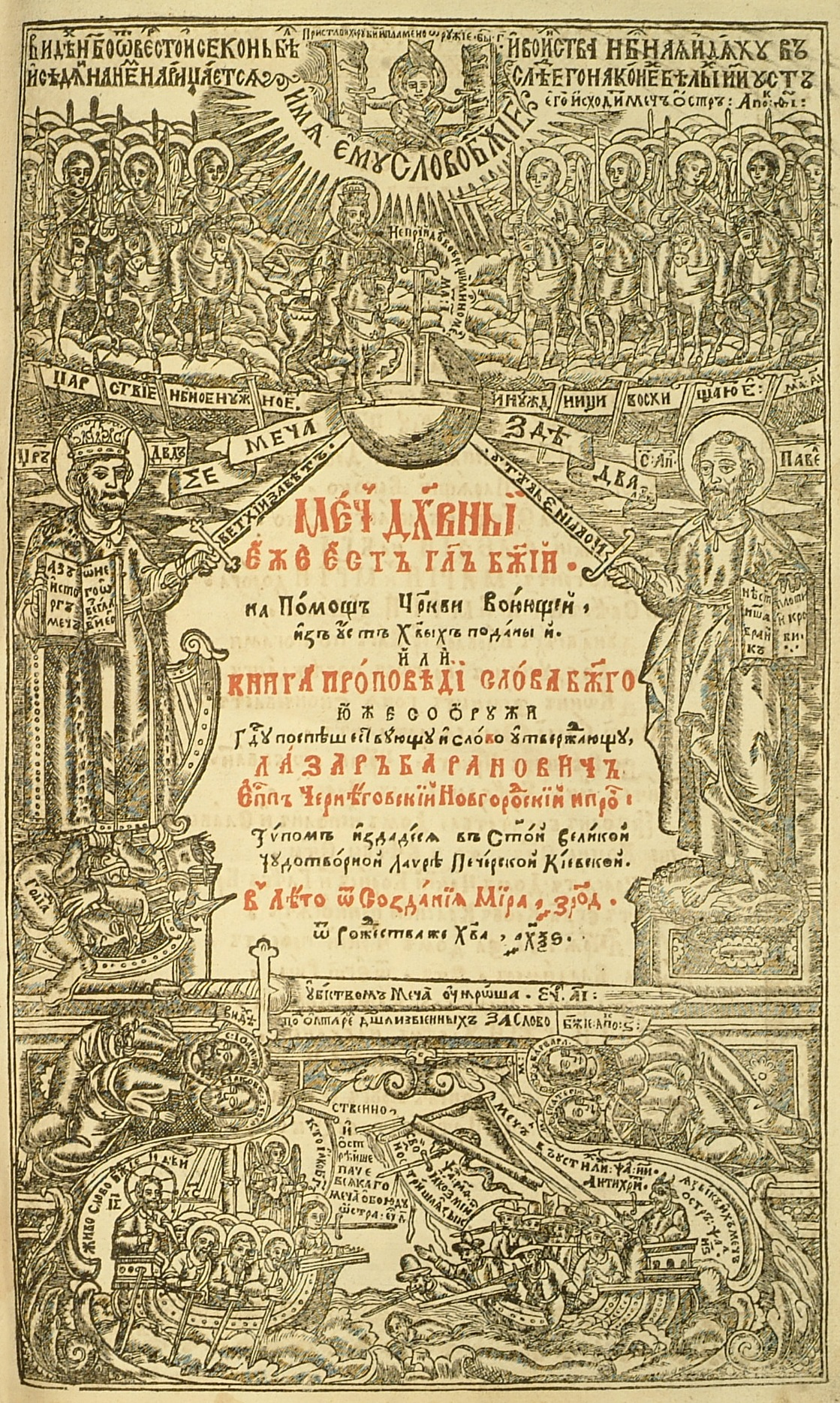
Front page of Mech dukhovny (1666)

== Publications ==
Baranovych was known primarily as an author of sermons, but he also composed verses in Polish language and works of polemic literature. His writings were edited by Innocent Gisel and Theodosius Sofonovych. Baranovych also designed engravings to illustrate his works.

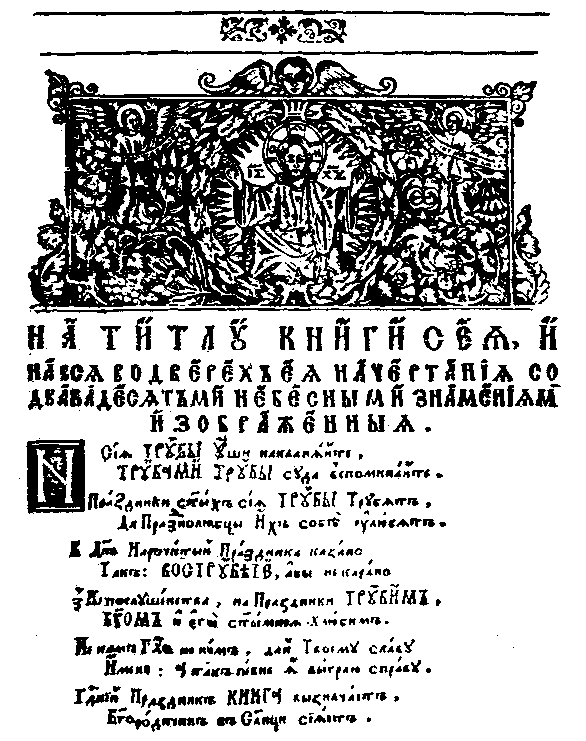
Autograph of Truby sloves propovidnykh

The publications of his sermons, written in a baroque style in Church Slavonic language, include:

- Mech dukhovny (The Spiritual Sword, 1666); and
- Truby sloves propovidnykh (The Trumpets of Preaching Words, 1674).

He is the author of several polemical works against Catholicism in Polish and Church Slavonic (see also Polemical literature); of a poetry collection in Polish, Lutnia Apollinowa (Apollo's Lute, 1671); and of a large correspondence. Among other things, Lutnia Apollinowa contains six epitaphs for Metropolitan Petro Mohyla.

== Publishing activities ==
Between 1663 and 1668 Baranovych cooperated with the printing houses of Kyiv Pechersk Lavra and Brotherhood Monastery in order to publish his books Mech dukhovny and Truby sloves propovidnykh. Due to the lack of paper in Ukraine during that time, the manuscript of the second work had to be sent to Moscow, where its printing was lobbied by Simeon of Polotsk. In 1674 Baranovych established a printing house at the Monastery of Holy Transfiguration in Novhorod-Severskyi, where he printed his own works, as well as books by Demetrius Tuptalo and other authors. After being damaged by fire, in 1679 the press moved was to Chernihiv's Trinity Monastery, which had its own paper mill. There Baranovych printed around 40 books of different authors, including Stefan Yavorsky. At the time Chernihiv printing house remained the only establishment of that type in Left-bank Ukraine.

== Sources ==
- Baranovych, Lazar at the Encyclopedia of Ukraine
- Лазар Баранович
- [in Ukrainian] Лазар Баранович, архієп. Нагробки митрополиту Петру Могилі / Переклад зі старопольської, вступна стаття та коментарі архім. Митрофана (Божка) // Труди Київської Духовної Академії. — №37. — К.: Київська духовна академія і семінарія, 2022. — С.140–147.

Preceded by Zosimas Prokopovych	Archbishop of Chernihiv; 1657–1692	Succeeded by Theodosius Polonytsky-Uhlytsky as bishop of Moscow Patriarchate
