= List of Eastern Orthodox bishops and archbishops =

This is a list of Eastern Orthodox bishops, archbishops, metropolitans and patriarchs. See also Eastern Orthodox Church organization and Patriarch.

== Autocephalous churches ==
=== Ecumenical Patriarchate of Constantinople ===
- Archbishop of Constantinople and New Rome, Ecumenical Patriarch
- Metropolitan of Chalcedon
- Metropolitan of Derkoi
- Metropolitan of the Prince Islands
- Metropolitan of Imbros and Tenedos
- Metropolitan of Pisidia
- Metropolitan of Silybria
- Metropolitan of Adrianople
- Metropolitan of Smyrna
- Metropolitan of Prousia

==== Bishops of the Dodecanese Islands ====
- Metropolitan of Rhodes
- Metropolitan of Kos and Nisyros
- Metropolitan of Leros, Kalymnos and Astypalaia
- Metropolitan of Karpathos and Kasos
- Metropolitan of Symi

==== Bishops of the New Lands (Bishops appointed by Church of Greece) ====
- Metropolitan of Alexandroupolis
- Metropolitan of Veria, Naoussa and Campania
- Metropolitan of Goumenissi, Axioupolis and Polycarp
- Metropolitan of Grevena
- Metropolitan of Didymoteicho, Orestiados and Soufli
- Metropolitan of Drama
- Metropolitan of Dryinoupolis, Pogoniani and Konitsa
- Metropolitan of Edessa and Pella
- Metropolitan of Elassona
- Metropolitan of Eleftheroupolis
- Metropolitan of Zichna and Nevrokopi
- Metropolitan of Thessaloniki
- Metropolitan of Ierissos, Mount Athos and Ardamero
- Metropolitan of Ioannina
- Metropolitan of Kassandria
- Metropolitan of Kastoria
- Metropolitan of Citrus
- Metropolitan of Lagada, Liti and Rentini
- Metropolitan of Lemnos
- Metropolitan of Maroneia and Komotini
- Metropolitan of Mithymna
- Metropolitan of Mytilene
- Metropolitan of Neapolis and Stavropoleos
- Metropolitan of Nea Krini and Kalamaria
- Metropolitan of Nicopolis and Preveza
- Metropolitan of Xanthi
- Metropolitan of Paramythia, Filiates and Giromerios
- Metropolitan of Polyani and Kilkis
- Metropolitan of Samos and Ikaria
- Metropolitan of Servia and Kozani
- Metropolitan of Serres and Nigritis
- Metropolitan of Sidirokastro
- Metropolitan of Sisanios and Siatisti
- Metropolitan of Philippi, Neapolis and Thassos
- Metropolitan of Florina, Prespa and Eordaia
- Metropolitan of Chios

==== Church of Crete (semi-autonomous) ====
- Archbishop of Crete
- Metropolitan of Gortyna and Arcadia
- Metropolitan of Rethymno and Avlopotamos
- Metropolitan of Kydonia and Apokoronas
- Metropolitan of Lambi, Syvritos and Sfakia
- Metropolitan of Hierapytna and Sitia
- Metropolitan of Petra and Chersonissos
- Metropolitan of Kissamos and Selinos
- Metropolitan of Arkalochori

==== Other Dioceses in Europe ====
- Archbishop of Thyateira and Great Britain
- Metropolitan of France
- Metropolitan of Germany
- Metropolitan of Austria
- Metropolitan of Sweden and All Scandinavia
- Metropolitan of Belgium
- Metropolitan of Switzerland
- Metropolitan of Italy
- Metropolitan of Spain and Portugal

==== Ukrainian Orthodox Church of the USA ====
- Metropolitan of Hieropolis and of the UOC of USA
- Archbishop of Pamphilon

==== Ukrainian Orthodox Church of Canada ====
- Archbishop of Winnipeg and the Central Eparchy, Metropolitan of Canada and of the Ukrainian Orthodox Church of Canada
- Bishop of Edmonton and of the Eastern Eparchy
- Bishop of Toronto and of the Western Eparchy

==== Other Dioceses in the Americas ====
- Archbishop of America (Greek Orthodox Archdiocese of America)
- Metropolitan of Boston
- Metropolitan of Denver
- Metropolitan of Atlanta
- Metropolitan of Detroit
- Metropolitan of Pittsburgh
- Metropolitan of San Francisco
- Metropolitan of New Jersey
- Metropolitan of Chicago

===== Dioceses elsewhere =====
- Archbishop of Australia of the Greek Orthodox Archdiocese of Australia
- Metropolitan of Singapore and South Asia
- Metropolitan of Korea
- Metropolitan of Hong Kong and Southeast Asia

=== Greek Orthodox Church of Alexandria ===
- Pope and Patriarch of Alexandria and All Africa
- Metropolitan of Cesarea
- Metropolitan of Cameroon and Exarch of Central Africa
- Metropolitan of Memphis
- Metropolitan of Leontopolis
- Metropolitan of Kyrini
- Metropolitan of Mwanza
- Metropolitan of Guinea
- Metropolitan of Irinopolis
- Metropolitan of Katanga
- Metropolitan of Botswana
- Metropolitan of Heliopolis
- Metropolitan of Nouvias
- Metropolitan of Zambia
- Metropolitan Of Nafcratis
- Metropolitan of Pelusium
- Metropolitan of Carthage
- Metropolitan of Congo-Brazzaville and Gabon
- Metropolitan of Accra
- Metropolitan of Aksum
- Metropolitan of Kananga
- Metropolitan of Nigeria
- Metropolitan of Diospoli
- Archbishop of Kenya
- Archbishop of Zimbabwe and Angola
- Archbishop of the Cape of Good Hope
- Archbishop of Ermoupolis
- Archbishop of Johannesburg and Pretoria
- Archbishop of Antananarivo and North Madagascar
- Αrchbishop of Kinshasa
- Bishop of Nieri and Mount Kenya
- Bishop of Arusha and Central Tanzania
- Bishop of Gulu and Eastern Uganda
- Bishop of Malawi
- Bishop of Toliara and Southern Madagascar
- Bishop of Kisumu
- Bishop of Gulu and Northern Uganda
- Bishop of Bukoba
- Bishop of Bujumbura and Burundi
- Bishop of Bunia, Kisangani and Eastern Congo
- Bishop of Goma and Great Kivu
- Bishop of Benin, Togo and Burkina Faso
- Bishop of Juba and South Sudan
- Bishop of Gaborone and Botswana
- Bishop of Kigali and Rwanda

=== Greek Orthodox church of Antioch ===
- Metropolitan of Antioch and Damascus, Patriarch of Antioch and the East
- Metropolitan of Akkar
- Metropolitan of Aleppo (Beroea) and Alexandretta
- Metropolitan of Beirut
- Metropolitan of Bosra, Hauran and Jabal al-Arab
- Metropolitan of Byblos and Batroun
- Metropolitan of Homs (Emesa)
- Metropolitan of Hama (Epiphania) and Exarchate of North Syria
- Metropolitan of Latakia (Laodicea ad Mare) and Exarchate of Theodorias
- Metropolitan of Zahleh and Baalbek (Heliopolis)
- Metropolitan of Tripoli and Koura
- Metropolitan of Tyre and Sidon
- Metropolitan of Baghdad, Kuwait and Dependencies
- Metropolitan of Australia, New Zealand and the Philippines
- Metropolitan of France, Western and Southern Europe
- Metropolitan of Germany and Central Europe
- Metropolitan of the British Isles and Ireland
- Metropolitan of North America (based in Englewood, New Jersey)

=== Greek Orthodox Church of Jerusalem ===
- Patriarch of the Holy City of Jerusalem and all Holy Land
- Metropolitan of Nazareth
- Metropolitan of Capitolias
- Metropolitan of Bostra
- Metropolitan of Diocesarea
- Metropolitan of Helenoupolis
- Archbishop of Gerassa
- Archbishop of Yaffo
- Archbishop of Tiberias
- Archbishop of Avela
- Archbishop of Constantina
- Archbishop of Tabor
- Archbishop of Qatar
- Archbishop of Sebastia
- Archbishop of Lydda
- Archbishop of Pella
- Archbishop of Hierapolis
- Archbishop of Anthedona
- Archbishop of Kyriakoupolis
- Archbishop of Madaba

=== Russian Orthodox Church ===
- Patriarch of Moscow and all Rus'

=== Georgian Orthodox Church ===
- Archbishop of Mtskheta-Tbilisi, Catholicos-Patriarch of All Georgia
- Archbishop of Tsageri and Lentekhi
- Archbishop of Bodbe
- Archbishop of Stepantsminda and Khevi
- Archbishop of Rustavi and Marneuli
- Archbishop of Dmanisi, Agarak-Tashiri, Great Britain and Ireland
- Archbishop of Akhalkalakhi

=== Serbian Orthodox Church ===
- Archbishop of Peć, Serbian Patriarch

=== Romanian Orthodox Church ===
- Archbishop of Bucharest, Patriarch of All Romania
- Archbishop of Alba Iulia
- Archbishop of Arad
- Archbishop of Argeș
- Archbishop of Buzău
- Archbishop of Chișinău
- Archbishop of Cluj
- Archbishop of Craiova
- Archbishop of Iași
- Archbishop of Lower Danube
- Archbishop of Roman
- Archbishop of Sibiu
- Archbishop of Suceava
- Archbishop of Târgoviște
- Archbishop of Timișoara
- Archbishop of Tomis (Constanţa)
- Archbishop of Vâlcea

=== Bulgarian Orthodox Church ===
- Metropolitan of Sofia, Patriarch of All Bulgaria

=== Church of Cyprus ===
- Archbishop of Nea Justiniana and All Cyprus

=== Church of Greece ===
- Archbishop of Athens and all Greece

=== Albanian Orthodox Church ===
- Archbishop of Tirana, Durrës and all Albania
- Metropolitan of Korça
- Metropolitan of Gjirokastra
- Metropolitan of Berati
- Metropolitan of Amantia
- Bishop of Apollonia and Fier
- Bishop of Elbasan
- Bishop of Kruja

=== Polish Orthodox Church ===
- Archbishop of Warsaw, Metropolitan of All Poland
- Archbishop of Białystok and Gdańsk
- Archbishop of Wrocław and Szczecin
- Archbishop of Przemyśl and Gorlice
- Archbishop of Lublin and Chełm
- Bishop of Łódź and Poznań
- Archbishop of Rio de Janeiro and Olinda–Recife

=== Orthodox Church of the Czech Lands and Slovakia ===
- Archbishop of Presov and Slovakia, Metropolitan of the Czech lands and Slovakia
- Archbishop of Prague and Czech Lands
- Archbishop of Brno and Olomuc
- Archbishop of Mihalovce and Kosice

=== Orthodox Church in America ===
- Archbishop of Washington, Metropolitan of All America and Canada
- Archbishop of San Francisco and the West
- Archbishop of Philadelphia and Eastern Pennsylvania
- Archbishop of Mexico City and Mexico
- Archbishop of Pittsburgh and Western Pennsylvania
- Archbishop of Ottawa and Canada
- Archbishop of New York and New Jersey
- Archbishop of Dallas and the South
- Archbishop of Chicago and the Midwest
- Archbishop of the Romanian Episcopate
- Bishop of Alaska and Sitka
- Bishop of Hartford and New England
- Bishop of the Albanian Episcopate
- Bishop of the Bulgarian Episcopate

=== Orthodox Church of Ukraine ===
- Metropolitan of Kyiv and All Ukraine
- Metropolitan of Halychna
- Metropolitan of Vinnytsia and Bratslav
- Metropolitan of Mykolaiv and Bohoiavlensk
- Metropolitan of Bohorodsk
- Metropolitan of Vinnytsia and Bar
- Metropolitan of Lviv
- Metropolitan of Ivano-Frankivsk and Halych
- Metropolitan of Lviv and Sokal
- Metropolitan of Simferopol and Crimea
- Metropolitan of Lutsk and Volhynia
- Metropolitan of Donetsk and Mariupol
- Metropolitan of Cherkasy and Chyhyryn
- Metropolitan of Ternopil and Kremenets
- Metropolitan of Poltava and Kremenchuk
- Metropolitan of Pereyaslav and Vyshneve
- Metropolitan of Rivne and Ostroh
- Metropolitan of Bila Tserkva
- Archbishop of Drohobych and Sambir
- Archbishop of Sumy and Okhtyrka
- Archbishop of Luhansk and Starobilsk
- Archbishop of Chernivtsi and Kitsman
- Archbishop of Vinnytsia and Tulchyn
- Archbishop of Volodymyr and Novovolynsk
- Archbishop of Kropyvnytskyi and Holovanivsk
- Archbishop of Zhytomyr and Polisia
- Archbishop of Kharkiv and Izium
- Archbishop of Chernivtsi and Khotyn
- Archbishop of Dnipro and lands of The Sich
- Archbishop of Ternopil and Buchach
- Archbishop of Odesa and Balta
- Archbishop of Kharkiv and Sloboda lands
- Bishop of Uzhhorod and Khust
- Bishop of Ternopil and Terebovlia
- Bishop of Kolomyia and Kosiv
- Bishop of Zaporizhia and Melitopol
- Bishop of Uzhhorod and Transcarpathia
- Bishop of Mukachevo and Carpathians
- Bishop of Kherson and Kakhovka
- Bishop of Zhytomyr and Ovruch
- Bishop of Donetsk and Sloviansk
- Bishop of Khmelnytskyi and Kamianets-Podilsky
- Bishop of Rivne and Sarny
- Bishop of Kherson and Taurida
- Bishop of Chernihiv and Nizhyn

=== Macedonian Orthodox Church - Archdiocese of Ohrid ===
- Archbishop of Ohrid and All Macedonia
- Metropolitan of Tetovo and Gostivar
- Metropolitan of Kumanovo and Osogovo
- Metropolitan of Debar and Kičevo
- Metropolitan of Prespa and Pelagonia
- Metropolitan of Strumica
- Metropolitan of Bregalnica
- Metropolitan of Povardarie
- Metropolitan of Kruševo
- Metropolitan of Deljadrovci-Ilinden
- Metropolitan of Delčevo and Makedonska

== Autonomous Churches ==
=== Finnish Orthodox Church ===
- Archbishop of Helsinki and all Finland
- Metropolitan of Karelia
- Metropolitan of Oulu

=== Estonian Apostolic Orthodox Church ===
- Metropolitan of Tallinn and All Estonia
- Metropolitan of Tartu
- Bishop of Pärnu and The Island

=== Church of Sinai ===
- Archbishop of Mount Sinai and Raithu

=== Orthodox Church in Japan ===
- Archbishop of Tokyo, Metropolitan of All Japan
- Bishop of Sendai and Eastern Japan
- Bishop of Kyoto and Western Japan

== See also ==
- List of Eastern Orthodox bishops in the United States and Canada
- List of Catholic dioceses (structured view)
  - List of Catholic dioceses (alphabetical)
  - List of Roman Catholic archdioceses
  - List of Roman Catholic dioceses
- List of Anglican dioceses and archdioceses
  - List of bishops in the Church of England
- List of current patriarchs
- List of Methodist Bishops
- Lists of office-holders
