= Cathedral of St. Charalambos =

- Соборна Харлампиевска церква
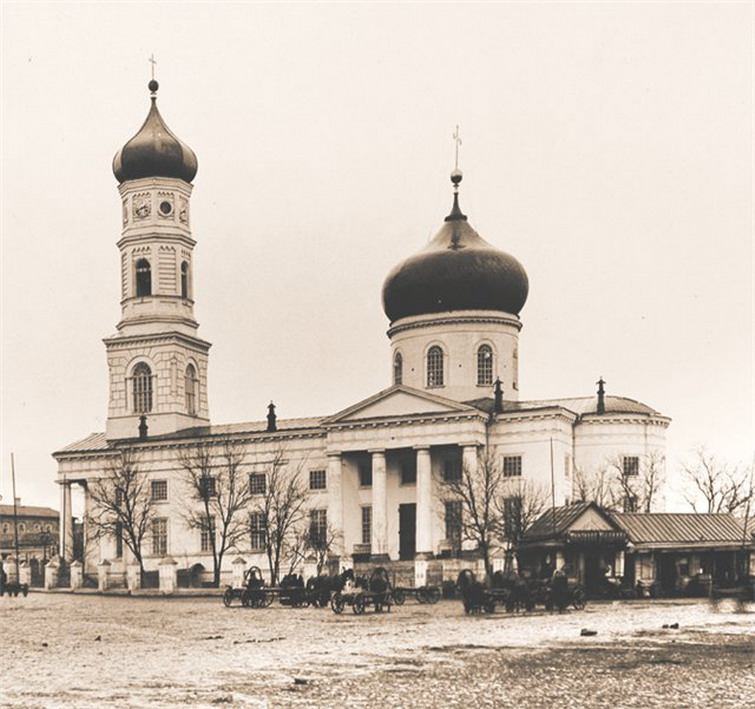
- Second Cathedral of St. Charalambos
- Cathedral of St. Charalambos
- 47°05′34″N 37°33′46″E
- Country: Ukraine
- Language(s): Ukrainian, Russian
- Denomination: Ukrainian Orthodox

History
- Status: Demolished
- Consecrated: 1)1780–1782, 2)1823–1845

Architecture
- Demolished: 1)1934, 2)1934

The Cathedral of St. Charalambos was the cathedral of Mariupol.

== The first Cathedral ==
The construction of the first Cathedral of St. Charalambos began in 1780 and finished in 1782. The church was consecrated on April 22, 1782, to serve the Orthodox population. After the construction of the new, second cathedral, the first cathedral was consecrated to St. Catherine's Church. It was also called the "Greek Church" (Russian: греческая церковь) because the liturgy was held in Greek on public holidays.

The old building stood until it was purposefully demolished in 1934 by order of the Bolshevik government as part of the Godless Five-Year Plan.

First Cathedral

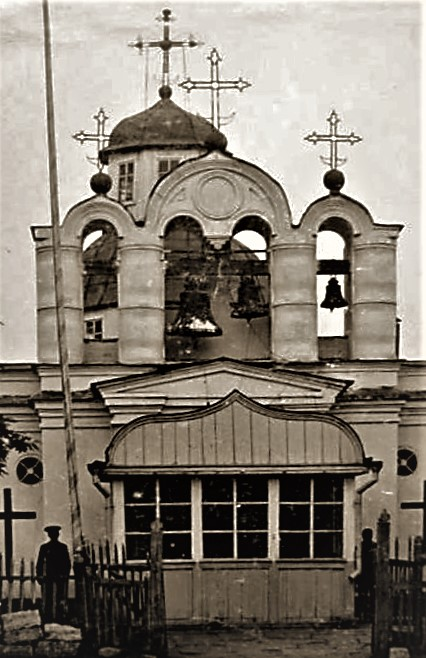

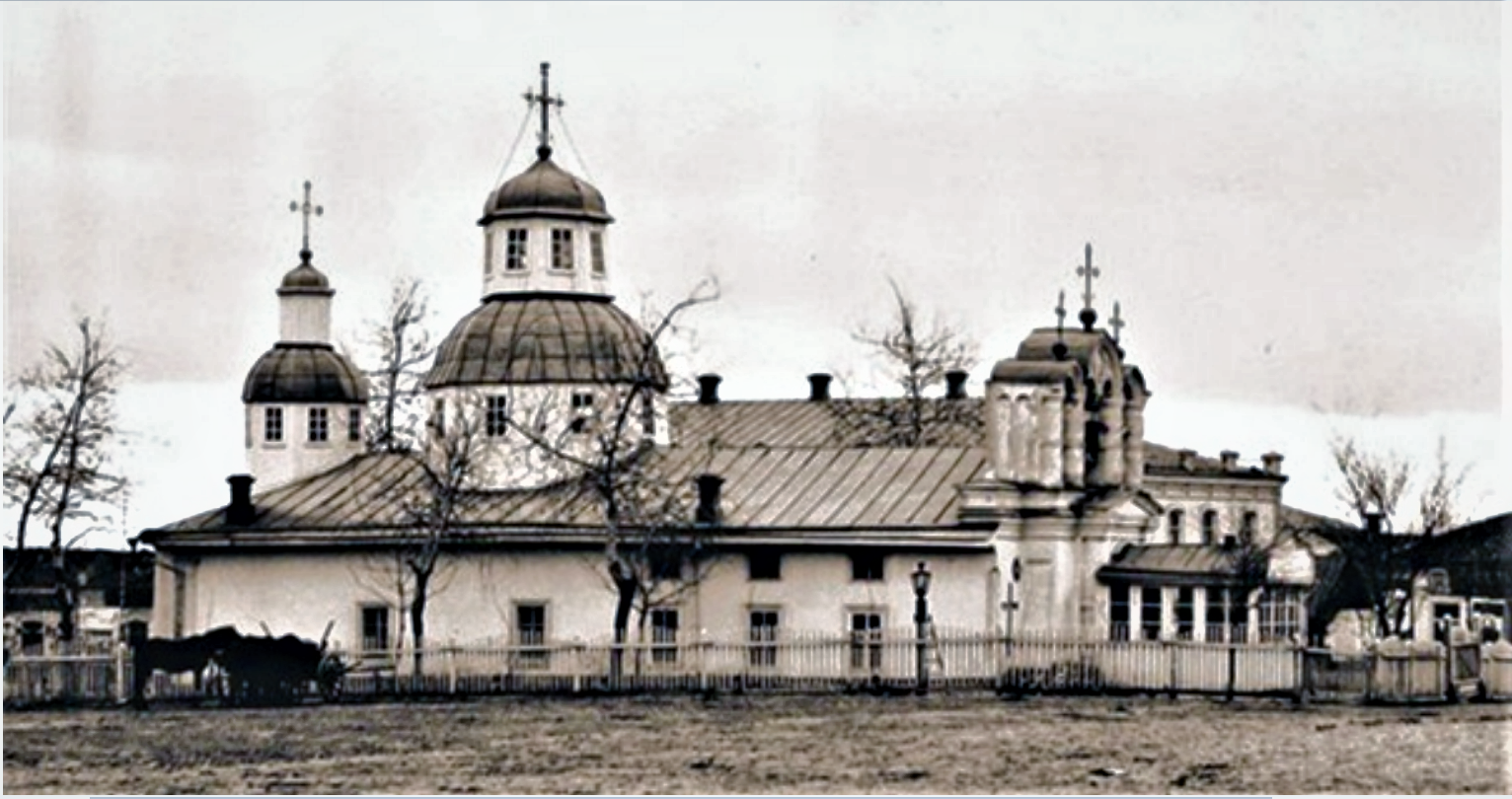

== The second Cathedral ==
The construction of the second Cathedral of St. Charalambos began in 1823 and finished in 1845. The church was consecrated on April 22, 1845, to serve the Orthodox population. The new church stood until it was purposefully demolished in 1934 by order of the Bolshevik government as part of the Godless Five-Year Plan.

The Cathedral had an architecture, combining the features of baroque, classical and traditional Russian church architectural techniques. Decoration of the facade had the features of the late baroque and classicism.

Second Cathedral

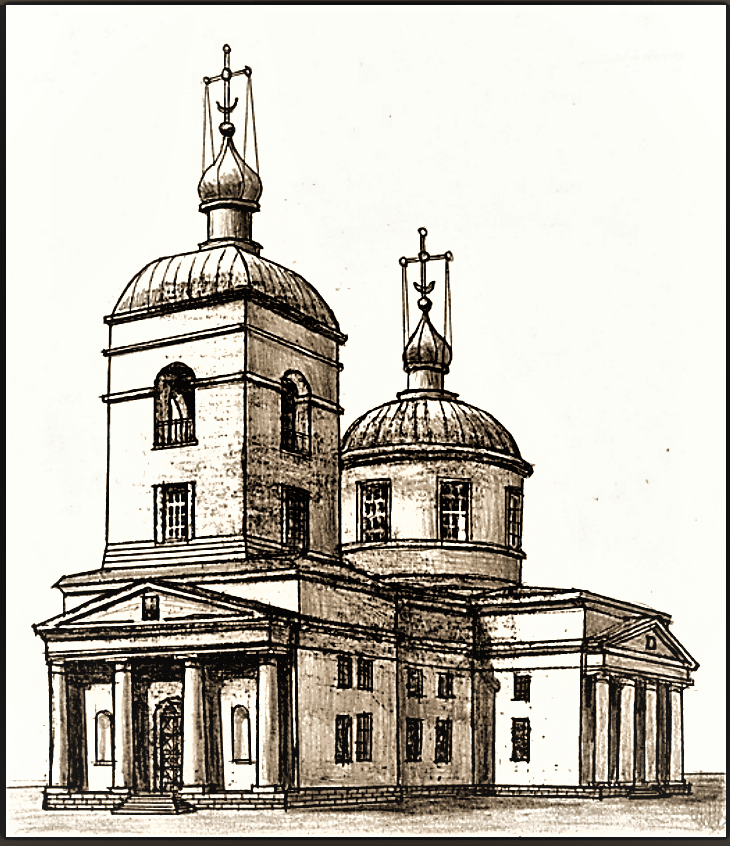

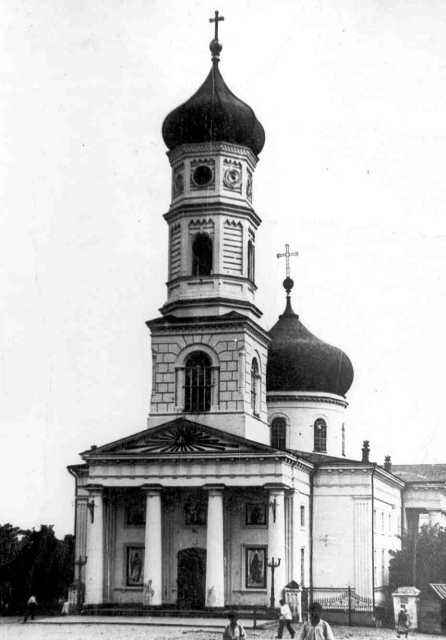

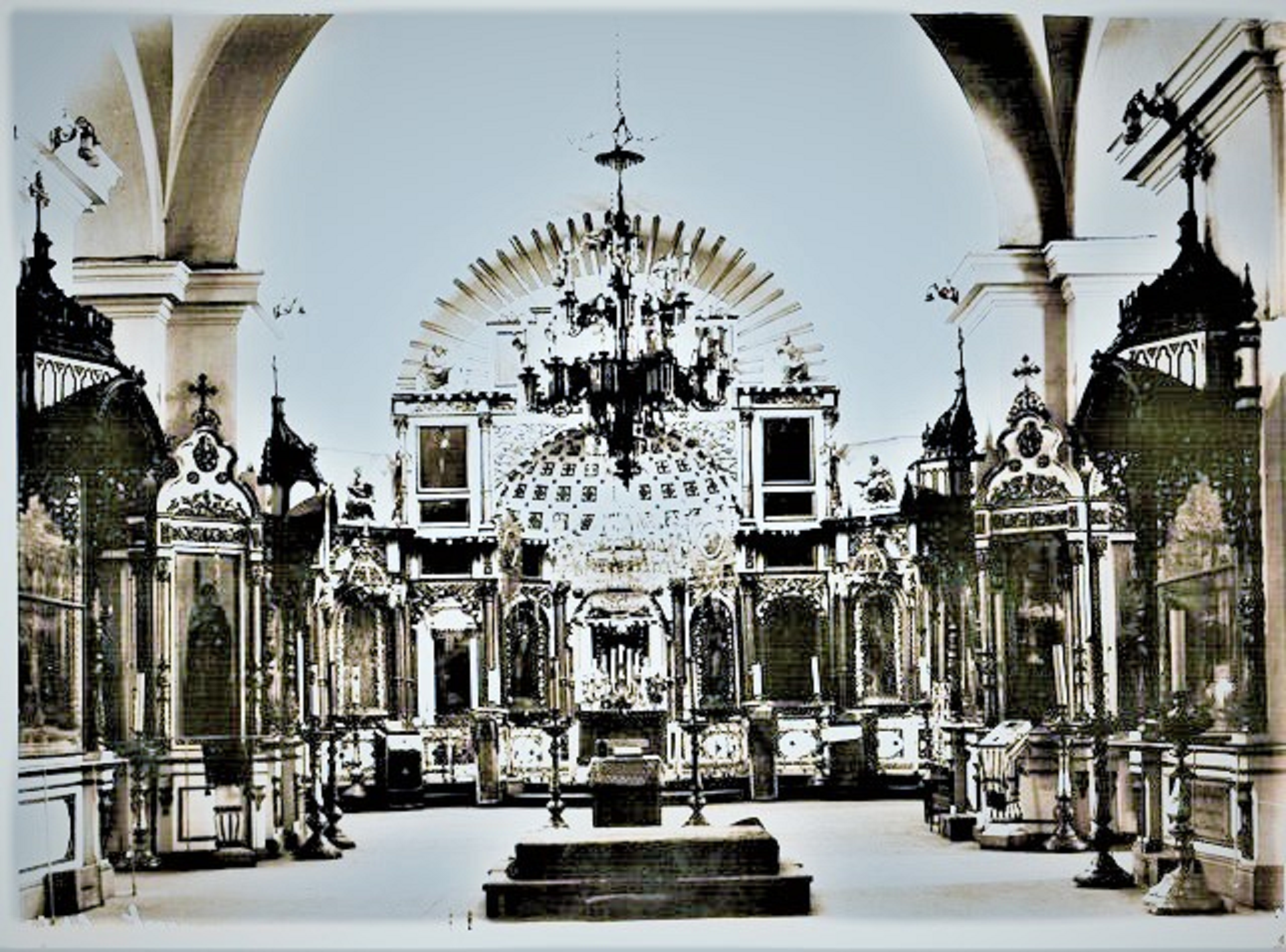
