= Archbishop of Akhalkalakhi =

List of Orthodox archbishops of Akhalkalaki of the Georgian Orthodox and Apostolic Church:

- Nikolozi Pachuashvili (present)

== See also ==
- List of Eastern Orthodox bishops and archbishops
