= Volhynian Orthodox Theological Academy =

Theological higher education institution in Ukraine

The Volhynian Orthodox Theological Academy (formerly the Volhynian Theological Seminary) is a higher educational institution with a six-year term of study that trains priests, workers of diocesan administrations and missions for the Orthodox Church in Ukraine.

== History ==
=== 1795–1939 years ===
On May 14, 1796, thanks to Volyn and Zhytomyr Bishop Barlaam Shyshatsky, the "Diocese Seminary" was opened, which later became the Volyn Seminary. This happened after the Volyn region was annexed by the Russian Empire under Catherine II in 1775. The mission of the seminary was to prepare candidates for priests for parishes that had switched from the Greek Catholic Church to the Orthodox Church. The seminary accepted Orthodox children (aged 7–15 years), who had previously studied in the Basilian and Jesuit schools in Ovruch, Mezhyrich, and Ostroh. Subsequently, the best students were sent to study at the Kyiv Theological Academy.

The complex of buildings of the Volhynian Theological Seminary in Zhytomyr (educational buildings, a dormitory, and outbuildings) was built in 1897–1902 on Illarionivska Street (now Hrushevsky Street). At that time, the Volyn Seminary was the largest in the entire empire and had one of the largest premises among other theological schools, and also played an important role in training personnel for the first revival of the Ukrainian Autocephalous Orthodox Church. In 1918, it was closed by the Bolsheviks.

From 1919 to 1939, the seminary was located for the second time in Kremianka (at that time, the Volyn Voivodeship of Poland), with a completely changed professor-teaching staff – teachers from the former Chelm Theological Seminary. After the merger of these seminaries, the Ukrainianization processes continued[3]. When the Volyn seminary was transferred to Kremenets, the bishop of Kremenets Dionizy Waledyński took up its organization. In 1939, the Poles still forced some subjects to be taught in Polish.

=== Soviet period. Closing of the seminary ===
After the end of the Second World War, the Volyn theological seminary began to function again, but already in the city of Lutsk.

Since 1954, the seminary began to build classrooms, bedrooms, and utility rooms.

From 1946 to 1954, the Volyn Theological Seminary graduated only 17 students. However, there were years when the number of graduates reached 40 or more. And in just twenty post-war years, the seminary graduated more than 500 priests who served for the good of the Church not only in the Volyn region, but also in other regions.

As a result of the pressure of the Soviet authorities, after the closure of the Kyiv, Saratov, and Stavropol seminaries in 1960, the Volyn Theological Seminary was closed in August 1964.

=== Restoration of the seminary ===
In October 1990, under Bishop Bartholomew (Vashchuk), the Lutsk Theological School was opened, which a year later received the status of a Theological Seminary, with Bishop Bartholomew (Vashchuk) becoming its rector.

After the declaration of Ukraine's independence and the creation of the Ukrainian Orthodox Church - Kyiv Patriarchate on August 12, 1992, the Lutsk Holy Trinity Cathedral, the premises of the diocese and the seminary were handed over to the believers of the Kyiv Patriarchate (now the Orthodox Church of Ukraine).
