= Trgovište (disambiguation) =

Trgovište may refer to the following places:

== Serbia ==
- Trgovište, small town and municipality in Pčinja District
- Trgovište (Knjaževac), village in Knjaževac Municipality
- Trgovište (Kraljevo), village in Kraljevo Municipality
- Trgovište (Sokobanja), village in Sokobanja Municipality
- Staro Trgovište, old market-place near Stari Ras in Novi Pazar Municipality
- Novo Trgovište, old Serbian name for the city of Novi Pazar

== Bosnia and Herzegovina ==
- Trgovište, Bosnia and Herzegovina, village in Republika Srpska

== See also ==
- Targoviste (disambiguation)
