= Targoviste =

Targoviste (Bulgarian: Търговище [tɐrˈɡɔviʃtɛ]; Serbian: Трговиште) means 'marketplace' and may refer to:

- Targovishte, a city in Bulgaria
  - Targovishte Municipality
  - Targovishte Province
- Târgoviște, a city in Romania, the former capital of Wallachia
- Târgoviște, a village in Balinț commune, Timiș County, Romania
- Night attack at Târgoviște, attack by Vlad III on Mehmed II's Army at night
- AFC Chindia Târgoviște, a Romanian football club

== See also ==
- Trgovište (disambiguation)
