= Metropolitan of Kyiv and All Ukraine =

Primate of the Orthodox Church of Ukraine

- Archbishopric

Eastern Orthodox
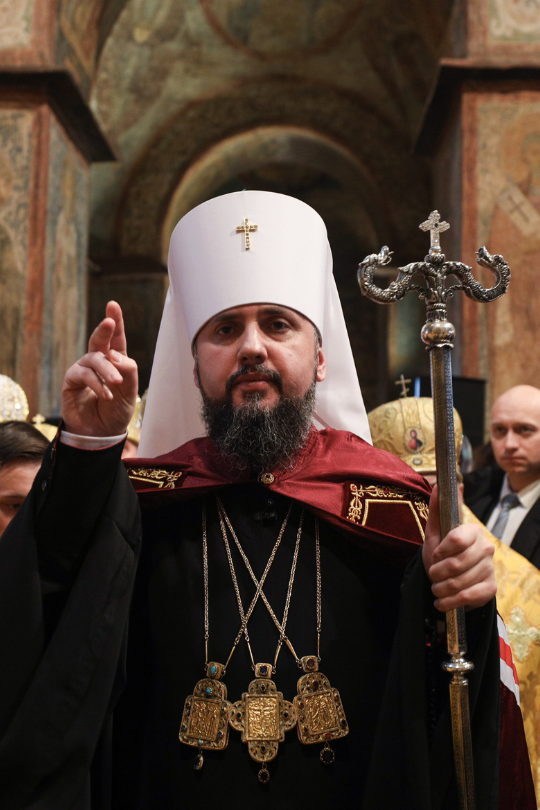

- Monogram of Metropolitan of Kyiv and All Ukraine
- Incumbent; Epiphanius of Kyiv since 15 December 2018
- Style: His Beatitude

Location
- Country: Ukraine

Information
- Denomination: Byzantine Orthodoxy
- Established: 2018
- Cathedral: St. Michael's Golden-Domed Monastery, Kyiv

The Metropolitan of Kyiv and All Ukraine is the metropolitan bishop who is the head of the Orthodox Church of Ukraine. This ecclesiastical title was created and canonized at the Unification council of 2018 held in Kyiv, Ukraine. The incumbent is Epiphanius of Kyiv. Epiphanius is not the only holder of this title as it is contested.

== Metropolitan of Kyiv and All Ukraine ==
=== Governance ===
The head of the Orthodox Church of Ukraine is elected for life, his title is "His Beatitude Metropolitan of Kyiv and All Ukraine". According to the Statute, the Metropolitan of Kyiv is elected from three by the Local Council chaired by the vicar by secret ballot.

Ex officio, the Metropolitan of Kyiv and All Ukraine chairs assemblies (councils) of the Local Church, Bishops, and Holy Synod. Relations of the Metropolitan of Kyiv and all Ukraine with others diocesan bishops and other hierarchs of the Local Church are determined in accordance with the provisions of the statutory documents of the Orthodox Church of Ukraine according to the 34th Apostolic Rule and the 9th Rule of the Antiochian Council, as well as in accordance with the provisions of the Patriarchal and Synodal Tomos, delivered on January 6, 2019.

The Primate is accountable to the Local Church and Bishop Councils. The Primate takes care of the life of the Orthodox Church of Ukraine and governs it together with the Holy Synod.

The Metropolitan of Kyiv and All Ukraine commemorates the names of the Ecumenical Patriarch and other Patriarchs and heads of autocephalous Orthodox Churches in a diptych during the liturgy. All hierarchs of the Orthodox Church of Ukraine commemorate the name of the Metropolitan of Kyiv and all Ukraine during the liturgy. After the conclave's election to the Kyiv See, the new Primate announces it through "Letters of Peace" to the Ecumenical Patriarch, the Primates of the Ancient Thrones and the heads of other Autocephalous Orthodox Churches, testifying to them of his unchanging observance of Orthodox dogmas and holy canons.

The external signs of the Primate's dignity are a white hood, two Panagias, a purple (crimson) mantle and a nasal cross. The Primate of the Orthodox Church of Ukraine has a personal seal and his own form with religious symbols, where his name and title are indicated.

The Metropolitan of Kyiv and All Ukraine is the sacred archimandrite of the Holy Dormition Kyiv-Pechersk Lavra, Michael's Golden-Top Monastery, and other monasteries of special historical significance, and heads the metropolitan stauropegions.

The right to judge the Metropolitan of Kyiv and all Ukraine belongs to the Local Church Council at the request of the Council of Bishops.

In the case of permanent incapacity, which creates significant obstacles for the further performance of service, the Primate has the right to appeal to the Local Church Council through the Council of Bishops with a request for retirement. In order to preserve church unity and continuity of governance in the case of:

1. the death of the Metropolitan of Kyiv and All Ukraine,
2. his voluntary retirement, approved by the Local Council,
3. church condemnation by the Local Council,
4. in the presence of an incurable disease that permanently makes it impossible for him to perform the duties of the Superior, which must be certified by the opinion of an independent competent professional commission appointed by the Council of Bishops,
  1. the senior diocesan bishop of the Orthodox Church of Ukraine by ordination is appointed by the Holy Synod as the Vicar of the Throne.
  2. If, due to age, health, or other insurmountable circumstances, such a bishop cannot perform the duties of the Local Vicar, or if he has refused the appointment in writing, the Holy Synod chooses another diocesan bishop, observing the principle of seniority and taking care of the good and unity of the Church.

During the period of vacancy of the Kyiv diocese:

1. the Orthodox Church of Ukraine is governed by the Holy Synod under the chairmanship of the Locum Tenens;
2. the name of the Locum Tenens is pronounced in all churches of the Orthodox Church of Ukraine;
3. the Locum Tenens performs the duties of the Metropolitan of Kyiv and all Ukraine as they are set forth in the statutory documents of the Orthodox Church of Ukraine, except for the promotion of bishops in their ranks and the implementation of other types of awards to the clergy and laity;
4. messages to the Ukrainian flock, as well as to the heads of other Churches, are sent under the signature of the Locum Tenens.

After the vacancy of the Kyiv See, the Locum Tenens and the Holy Synod convene a Local Council no later than 6 months after that to elect a new Primate.

A Candidate for the Superior must meet the following requirements:

1. to be a bishop of the Orthodox Church of Ukraine for at least 10 years before the election; have a higher theological education, relevant experience of church leadership and be noted for commitment to the canonical legal order;
2. to enjoy the good opinion and trust of hierarchs, clergy and laity, to be unquestionably devoted to the Orthodox Church of Ukraine;
3. be at least 40 years old;
4. be a citizen of Ukraine and not have another citizenship at the time of the elections.

The election of the Metropolitan of Kyiv and all Ukraine takes place according to the following procedure:

1. at the Council of Bishops, three Candidates are nominated by secret ballot, which are submitted to the Local Council for consideration;
2. of all the Candidates proposed for consideration by the Synod of Bishops, the first three who received a relative majority of votes during the secret ballot are considered nominated for the Local Synod;
3. in case, as a result of the voting, the third and fourth Candidates proposed for consideration by the Council of Bishops received the same number of votes, which gives them the right to be considered nominated at the Local Council, a second vote is held for these two Candidates and the one nominated is considered nominated those who will receive a relative majority of votes;
4. if those who was nominated as a Candidate announces his withdrawal at any stage of the election process, he ceases to be a Candidate;
5. secret voting for the Candidates nominated for the position of Primate takes place during the meeting of the Local Council, for which a break is announced for the time of voting; the place and form of voting are determined by the Local Council;
6. the elected Metropolitan of Kyiv and All Ukraine is one of the nominated Candidates who, according to the results of the secret ballot, won more than half of the votes of the members of the Local Council;
7. in case, according to the results of the secret ballot, none of the nominated Candidates received more than half of the votes of the members of the Local Council, a second secret vote is held for the two Candidates who received a relative majority of the votes; after conducting a repeated secret ballot, the elected Metropolitan of Kyiv and All Ukraine is one of the two Candidates who, according to the results of such voting, received the relative majority of votes of the members of the Local Council.

After the announcement of the voting results, the bishop elected by the Local Council as the Metropolitan of Kyiv and All Ukraine certifies his consent to the election and becomes the Primate of the Orthodox Church of Ukraine, performing from that moment on the duties of the Metropolitan of Kyiv and All Ukraine as they are set forth in the statutory documents of the Orthodox Church of Ukraine. All members of the Local Council sign the Act on the election of the Primate, which is kept in the archives of the Kyiv Metropolis. The election of the new Metropolitan of Kyiv and all Ukraine and the date of his enthronement in the city of Kyiv are reported to the Ecumenical Patriarch and the Heads of other autocephalous Orthodox Churches. After the solemn enthronement according to the Divine Liturgy, the bishop elected by the Local Council becomes the Metropolitan of Kyiv and all Ukraine.

=== Use of the title ===
The head of the UOC-MP religious organization Onufrii Berezovskyi was warned by the Ecumenical Patriarch that after 15 December 2018, representatives of the Moscow Patriarchate have no right to ecclesiologically and canonically bear the title of Metropolitan of Kyiv. He went on to say that their use of such title was in violation of the terms of official documents of the ROC of 1686. This was reflected in the yearbook of the Patriarchate of Constantinople, published after the Orthodox Church of Ukraine received autocephaly: the bishops of the ROC in Ukraine are named in it only by reference to the place of residence; for example, Bishop Onufrii Berezovsky is no longer mentioned as the Metropolitan of Kyiv and All Ukraine, but is called "the Metropolitan of Kyiv." The entire episcopate of the ROC in Ukraine in the yearbook of the Ecumenical Patriarchate is included in the list of bishops of the Orthodox Church of Russia. Patriarch Bartholomew also met with ROC Patriarch Kirill and said that "the Ecumenical Patriarchate has decided to use all means to resolve the issue of granting autocephaly to the Ukrainian Orthodox Church. The decision was made in April. and Fanar implements this decision "(according to the representative of Bartholomew, Metropolitan of Gaul Emanuel).

== History ==
Epiphanius of Kyiv is the first Primate of the Orthodox Church of Ukraine. He is styled "Metropolitan of Kyiv and All Ukraine". He was elected at the Unification Council and received the tomos of autocephaly from the Ecumenical Patriarch on 6 January 2019. After the council, the newly elected metropolitan addressed the public on the Sophia Square in Kyiv.

Ukrainian Autocephalous Orthodox Church

- 1990–1993 Patriarch Mstyslav I of Kyiv and All Ukraine
- 1993–2000 Patriarch Demetrius I of Kyiv and All Ukraine
- 2000–2015 Metropolitan Methodius I of Kyiv and All Ukraine
- 2015–2018 Metropolitan Macarius I of Kyiv and All Ukraine

Ukrainian Orthodox Church

- 1992–1993 Patriarch Mstyslav I of Kyiv and All Ukraine (claimed)
- 1993–1995 Patriarch Volodymyr I of Kyiv and All Rus-Ukraine
- 1995–2018 Patriarch Philaretos I of Kyiv and All Rus-Ukraine

=== Historical titles ===
- Metropolitan of Kyiv, Halychyna and all Rus' (Metropolitan of Kyiv, Galicia and all Ruthenia)

== See also ==
- Metropolis of Kiev and all Rus'
- Metropolis of Kiev, Galicia and all Rus' (disambiguation)
- List of metropolitans and patriarchs of Kyiv
