= Orthodox Church of Ukraine =

Eastern Orthodox church in Ukraine (contested)

- Православна церква України
- Emblem of the Orthodox Church of Ukraine, depicting a cross with Orans of Kyiv
- Abbreviation: OCU
- Type: Autocephaly
- Classification: Christian
- Orientation: Eastern Orthodox
- Scripture: Septuagint, New Testament
- Theology: Eastern Orthodox theology
- Polity: Episcopal
- Primate: Epiphanius, Metropolitan of Kyiv and All Ukraine
- Bishops: 62 (as of December 2019)
- Clergy: 4,500 in total (as of December 2019)
- Parishes: 6,185 (2022)
- Monasteries/convents: 71 (both male and female)
- Language: Ukrainian; Church Slavonic; Romanian (de jure; nonfunctional vicariate) (Note: As of 2026, the vicariate had no appointed vicar, no affiliated parishes and no parishioners.); Greek
- Liturgy: Byzantine Rite
- Headquarters: (Ukraine) St. Michael's Golden-Domed Monastery, Kyiv (Note: The headquarters are in the Saint Sophia's Cathedral of Kyiv. St. Michael's Golden-Domed Monastery is used as the headquarters of the Metropolitan of Kyiv and all Ukraine)
- Territory: Ukraine
- Origin: 988: Establishment of the Metropolis of Kiev and all Rus'; 1448: Split of the Metropolis of Moscow; 1596: Union of Brest; 1620: Reestablishment of the Orthodox Church; 1685: Annexation by the Moscow Patriarchate; 1921: Creation of the "Assembly-Ruled" Autocephalous Church; 1937: Liquidation of the "Assembly-Ruled" Autocephalous Church by Soviet regime; 1946: Liquidation of all remaining Ukrainian churches; 1989: Revival Ukrainian religious organizations; 1990: Formation of the Ukrainian Orthodox Church; 1992: Unification and establishment of the Ukrainian Orthodox Church – Kyiv Patriarchate; 1993: Restoration of the smaller Ukrainian Autocephalous Orthodox Church; 2018: Unification Council
- Independence: 5 January 2019 (recognized and autocephaly granted)
- Recognition: Autocephaly recognized by: Ecumenical Patriarchate (5 January 2019); Patriarchate of Alexandria (8 November 2019); Church of Greece (19 October 2019); Church of Cyprus (24 October 2020)
- Merger of: UAOC; UOC-KP; UOC-MP (partly)
- Separations: Parts of the Ukrainian Orthodox Church – Kyiv Patriarchate on 20 June 2019 (see Conflict between Filaret and Epiphanius)
- Members: 78% of the Ukrainian Orthodox population (March 2022, study by Info Sapiens; 52% of the entire population of Ukraine)
- Other names: Ukrainian Orthodox Church; Most Holy Church of Ukraine
- Official website: www.pomisna.info

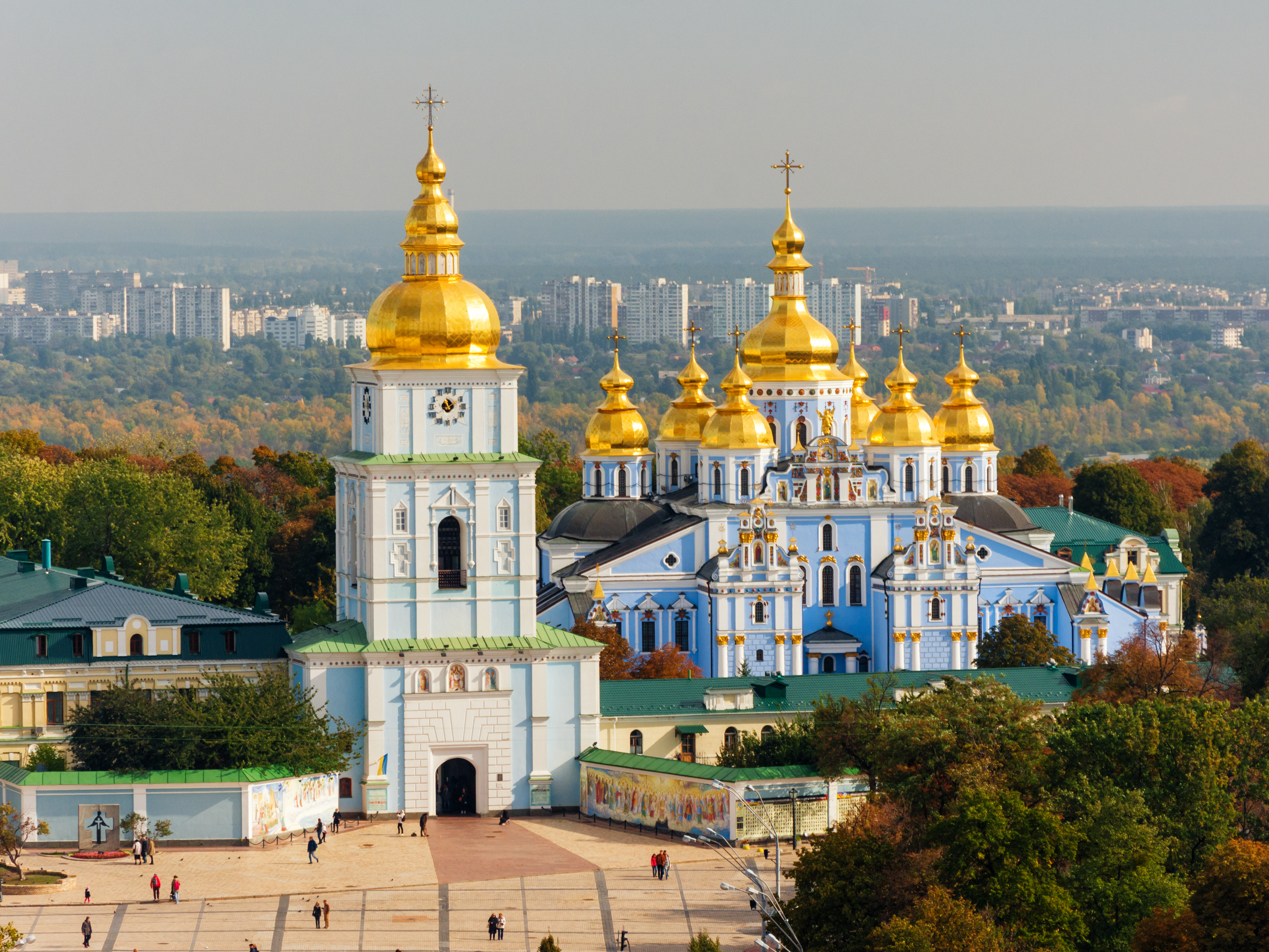
St. Michael's Golden-Domed Monastery in Kyiv, the headquarters of the Orthodox Church of Ukraine

The Orthodox Church of Ukraine (Ukrainian: Православна церква України, romanized: Pravoslavna tserkva Ukrainy; OCU), also called the Ukrainian Orthodox Church, is a partially recognized Eastern Orthodox church in Ukraine. It was granted autocephaly by the Ecumenical Patriarch of Constantinople on 6 January 2019.

Some of the Eastern Orthodox churches recognize the Orthodox Church of Ukraine as the only canonical successor of the Metropolis of Kyiv.

The church was established under the ecclesiastical jurisdiction of the Ecumenical Patriarchate of Constantinople by a unification council that convened in Kyiv on 15 December 2018, following which Ecumenical Patriarch Bartholomew I granted it a tomos of autocephaly. The unification council united the Ukrainian Orthodox Church – Kyiv Patriarchate and the Ukrainian Autocephalous Orthodox Church into the OCU. Two bishops formerly of the Ukrainian Orthodox Church (Moscow Patriarchate) (UOC-MP) also joined. The unification council elected the Metropolitan of Pereiaslav-Khmelnytskyi and Bila Tserkva, Epiphanius Dumenko, as its primate and as Metropolitan of Kyiv and All Ukraine.

It was also agreed by the council that those "Orthodox Christians of Ukrainian provenance in the Orthodox diaspora" should be subject to the jurisdiction of the diocesan bishops of the Ecumenical Patriarchate (per Article 4 of the Statute). This provision is also enshrined in the OCU's tomos of autocephaly. In March 2019, Metropolitan Epiphanius said that the transfer of parishes of the dissolved Kyiv Patriarchate to the jurisdiction of the Ecumenical Patriarchate had already begun.

The establishment of the OCU and its recognition by other autocephalous Eastern Orthodox churches has been opposed by the Russian Orthodox Church as well as by the Government of Russia. Other Orthodox churches have also not yet recognized this newly founded church as a legitimate Orthodox Church.

According to some sources, the OCU is the largest church in Ukraine, while other sources leave that attribute to the UOC-MP, both of which have claimed full independence and autonomy. Since the August 2024 adoption of a law against religious organisations collaborating with an aggressor state (Russia), the UOC-MP has been at risk of being banned by the Ukrainian government.

== Name ==
The official name of the church is the "Orthodox Church of Ukraine" (the use of the name "Ukrainian Orthodox Church" is also allowed). The style of its primate is "His Beatitude (name), Metropolitan of Kyiv and All Ukraine". The Tomos of autocephaly of the OCU refers to the OCU as the "Most Holy Church of Ukraine".

On 30 January 2019, the OCU was legally registered under the name "Kyїvan Metropolitanate of the Ukrainian Orthodox Church (Orthodox Church of Ukraine)" (Ukrainian: Київська Митрополія Української Православної Церкви (Православної Церкви України)). The head of the Ukrainian Department of Religious Affairs of the Ministry of Culture, Andriy Yurash, clarified: "These two terms [the UOC and the OCU] will be used as synonymous and this is expressly agreed with the Phanar. Therefore, the use of the terms, the Ukrainian Orthodox Church and the Orthodox Church of Ukraine, is affixed precisely to the administrative unit that is called the Kyivan Metropolitanate".

In his annual report at the hierarchal assembly on 15 December 2020, Metropolitan Epiphanius clarified that names of the following churches – "Ukrainian Autocephalous Orthodox Church", "Ukrainian Orthodox Church – Kyiv Patriarchate" and "Kyiv Patriarchate" – are all additional historical names for the same Orthodox Church of Ukraine.

== History ==
=== Metropolis of Kyiv ===
In 988, as a result of the Christianization of Kievan Rus' by Vladimir the Great, the first Christian church on the territories of Ukraine, Belarus and Russia was formed under the name of the Metropolitanate of Kyiv of the Ecumenical Patriarchate of Constantinople, with its center in the city of Kyiv. In 1299, Metropolitan of Kyiv and all Rus' Maximus moved to Vladimir in 1299; it is unclear why, although his decision has traditionally been connected to the Mongol invasion of Kievan Rus' in 1237–1241. His successor and later Metropolitan Peter moved the residence to Moscow in 1325. In 1437, Patriarch Joseph II appointed Isidore of Kiev as Metropolitan of Kiev and all Rus', but prince Vasily II of Moscow was suspicious of the new metropolitan due to his Catholic views. In 1448, the Council of Moscow's Bishops, following Isidore participation in the Council of Florence where he defended Catholicism, replaced him with Jonah as Metropolitan of Kiev and all Rus'. This event did not have the consent of the Patriarch of Constantinople and is considered the beginning of the secession of the unrecognised, Moscow-based Russian Orthodox Church. Meanwhile, Gregory the Bulgarian was appointed over what would become the Metropolis of Kiev, Galicia and all Rus' (1441–1596), initially based in Navahrudak, later moved to Vilnius.

During the 14th to 16th century, the Polish-Lithuanian Commonwealth expanded into Western territories of former Kievan Rus', taking control of Kyiv and promoting Catholic influence, that ultimately led to the Union of Brest in 1596. Under the Union of Brest, Kyiv, Galicia and partially territories East of the Dnipro controlled by Metropolitan bishop Michael Rohoza of Kyiv, Galicia and all Rus' joined the Roman Catholic Church, becoming the Ruthenian Uniate Church. Several Eastern Orthodox bishops objected against the union, primarily in the Ruthenian Voivodeship (Palatinatus russiae, what today is Western Ukraine) however due to the weak state of Orthodox Christianity in the 16th century caused by Ottoman and Mongol invasions, they were not able to stop the Uniate influence.

=== Annexation of the Metropolitanate of Kyiv by the Moscow Patriarchate ===
In 1685, the Moscow Patriarchate began the annexation of the Metropolitanate of Kyiv of the Ecumenical Patriarchate, ordaining Metropolitan Gedeon of Kyiv in Muscovy. In 1686, through simony, Ecumenical Patriarch Dionysius IV (who was later anathema) issued a Synodal letter granting the right to ordain the Metropolitan of Kyiv to the Moscow Patriarch in the manner of austerity elected by the council of clergy and the faithful of his diocese. It was obligatory that the Metropolitan of Kyiv should mention the Ecumenical Patriarch of Constantinople as his First Hierarch in any service, proclaiming and confirming his canonical dependence on the Mother Church of Constantinople, but none of these conditions were met. The Metropolitanate of Kyiv actually became one of the ordinary dioceses of the Moscow Patriarchate, when Peter the Great in 1722 appointed Barlaam (Voniatovych) to the rank of archbishop, not metropolitan. The Holy Synod of the Ecumenical Patriarchate in the process of granting autocephaly to the Church of Ukraine during its meeting on 11 October 2018 canceled the Synodal Letter of 1686 due to simony and its gross violation of the rights of an independent metropolitanate.

=== Attempts to restore the Orthodox Church of Ukraine in the jurisdiction of Constantinople ===
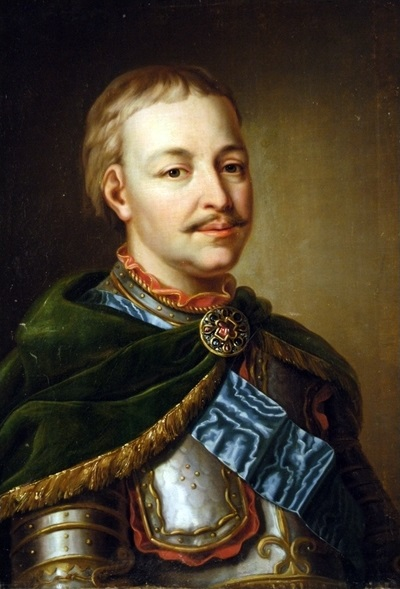
Ivan Mazepa, the Hetman of Ukraine

The Ukrainian Hetman Ivan Mazepa, seeking for the independence of the Cossack Hetmanate, was among the first to return to the omophorion of the Ecumenical Patriarchate. A multitude of churches were built all over Ukraine during his reign in the Ukrainian Baroque style. Despite the anathema, laid on Mazepa by the Russian Church in 1708, it was not recognized by the Ecumenical Patriarchate, which considers it uncanonical and imposed with political motives as a means of political and ideological repression, with no religious, theological or canonical reasons.

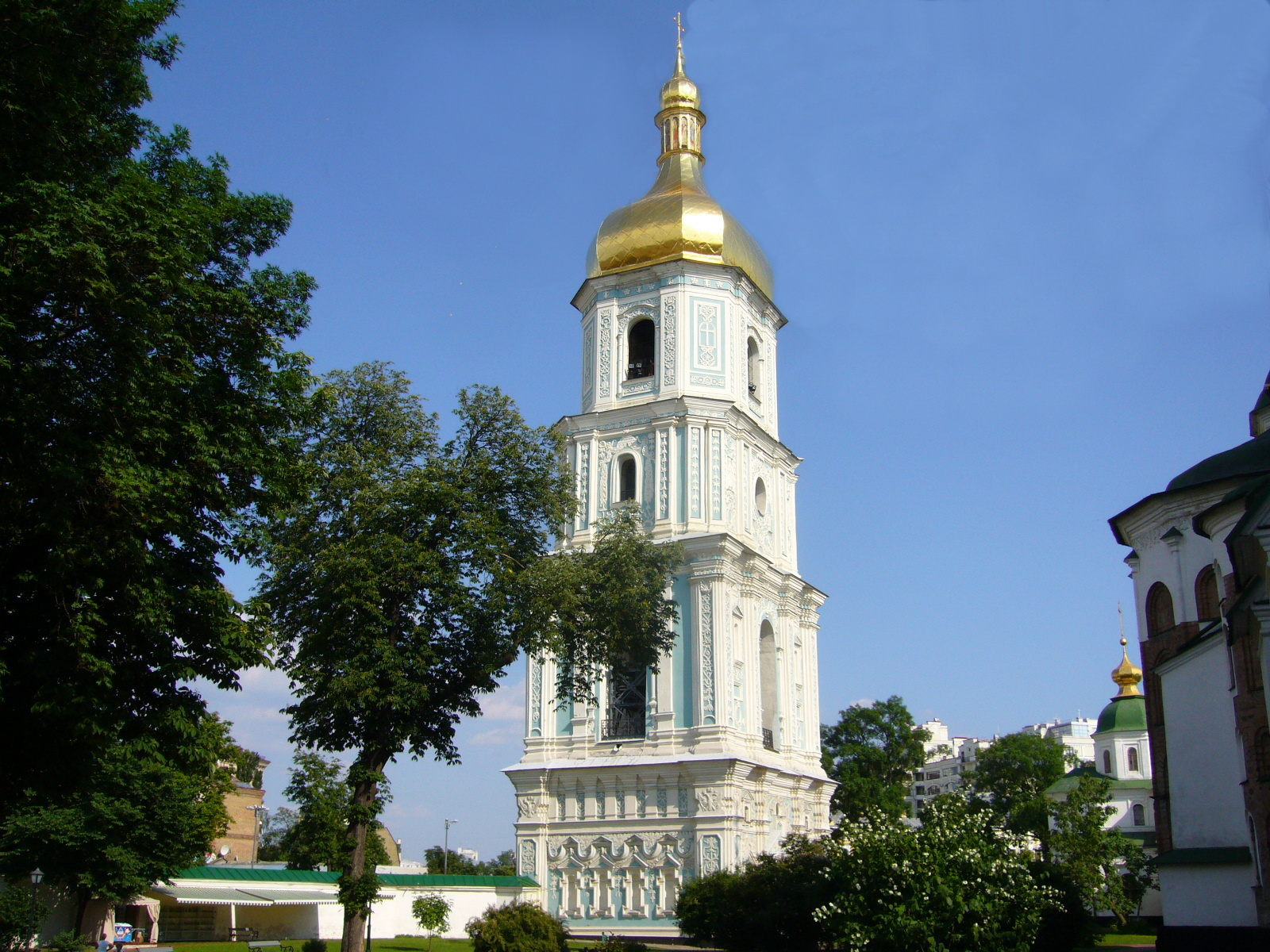
The belltower of Kyiv's Saint Sophia Cathedral, one of many church buildings in Ukraine built during the reign of Hetman Mazepa

The Constitution of Pylyp Orlyk, written in 1710, which is also considered to be one of the first examples of constitutional documents in the world, proclaimed the Eastern Orthodox faith to be the faith of Ukraine, with the Metropolitanate of Kyiv acquiring the direct subordination to the Apostolic Church of Constantinople. Due to the Battle of Poltava, when Charles XII of Sweden's and Hetman Mazepa's armies were defeated by Peter I of Russia, the constitution never came into power.

=== Proclaiming of the Ukrainian Autocephalous Orthodox Church ===
In the wake of the breakup of the Russian Empire, the Ukrainian Orthodox Christians again sought autonomy or autocephaly from Moscow. The independent, autocephalous Ukrainian Orthodox Church was proclaimed by the Directorate of Ukraine led by Symon Petliura in 1919.

The Law on the Supreme Government of the Ukrainian Autocephalous Orthodox Church stipulated that the Supreme Church Authority in Ukraine would lose all dependence on the Russian Patriarch and move to the All-Ukrainian Church Council.

In 1921 an All-Ukrainian Synod was called in Kyiv, and the Ukrainian Autocephalous Orthodox Church was declared independent from the Moscow Patriarchate. The Sobor delegates chose Metropolitan Vasyl Lypkivsky as head of the church. In this form, the Ukrainian Autocephalous Orthodox Church existed until 1936 when, due to Soviet pressure, it was liquidated, with some of its members emigrating to the United States.

For a short period of time, the UAOC was restored during occupation of Ukraine by Nazi Germany in 1942. This period lasted till the return of the Red Army in 1944, after that the UAOC was again liquidated for a second time and remained structured only in the Ukrainian diaspora.

In 1990, the Ukrainian Autocephalous Orthodox Church was reinstated in Ukraine, and the former Ukrainian Orthodox Church of Canada metropolitan Mstyslav (Skrypnyk) was enthroned as a patriarch. Since 2000, the church primate has been the Metropolitan of Kyiv and All Ukraine.

=== Unification council ===
Following months of negotiations and preparations, on 15 December 2018, all the bishops of the UOC-KP and the UAOC as well as two metropolitans of the UOC-MP convened in Kyiv's Saint Sophia Cathedral, presided over by the metropolitan of the ecumenical throne, Emmanuel Adamakis, to merge into the Orthodox Church of Ukraine, elect their primate and adopt the statute of the newly independent Church of Ukraine.

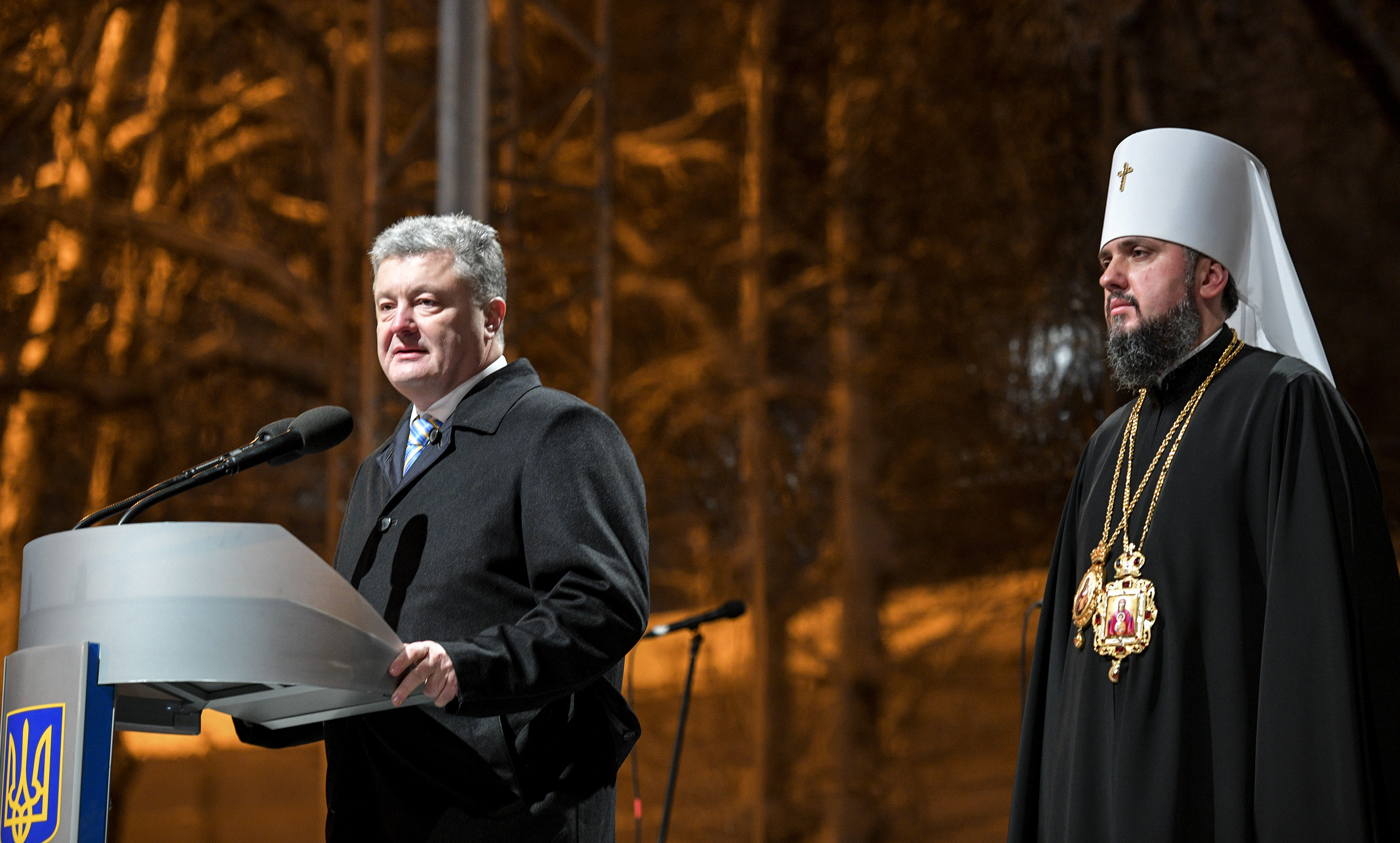
Metropolitan Epiphanius and Ukrainian President Poroshenko, right after the unification council

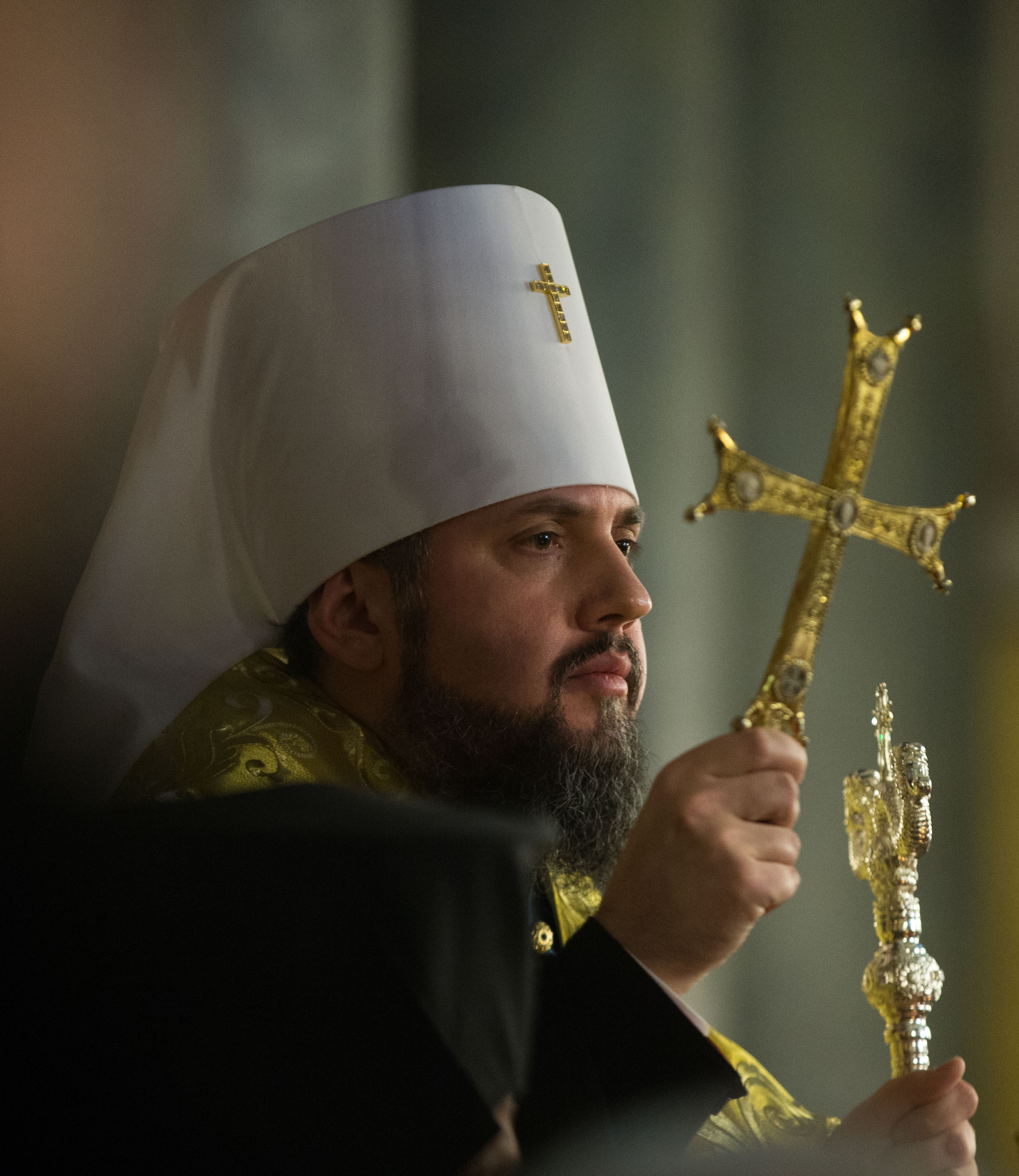
Epiphanius, first Metropolitan of Kyiv and all Ukraine of the OCU

Metropolitan Epiphanius of the UOC-KP, who had been chosen on 13 December by the UOC-KP as its only candidate, and was believed to have been Filaret Denysenko's right arm and protégé, was elected Metropolitan of Kyiv and all Ukraine by the unification council by the second round of voting.

Epiphanius later made clear that no important decision would be taken by his church until he had received the church's formal ecclesiastical decree (or "tomos").

The Ecumenical Patriarch congratulated and blessed the newly elected metropolitan on the day of his election and said the newly elected primate was invited to come to Istanbul to concelebrate the Divine Liturgy with the Ecumenical Patriarch and receive the Orthodox Church of Ukraine's tomos on 6 January 2019.

Shortly after the Council, Metropolitan Epiphanius said that the OCU had about 7 thousand parishes.

Advertisements to promote a united Ukrainian Orthodox Church had been made months prior to the Unification Council. Petro Poroshenko declared "not a dime" from the Ukrainian State had been paid for them, that he paid those advertisements with his own money. Poroshenko refused to state how much had been spent.

Following the Council, Filaret Denysenko, who had been the primate and Patriarch of the Ukrainian Orthodox Church – Kyiv Patriarchate (1995–2018), became the "honorary patriarch" of the Orthodox Church of Ukraine, serving in the St Volodymyr's Cathedral.

=== Granting of the tomos of autocephaly ===
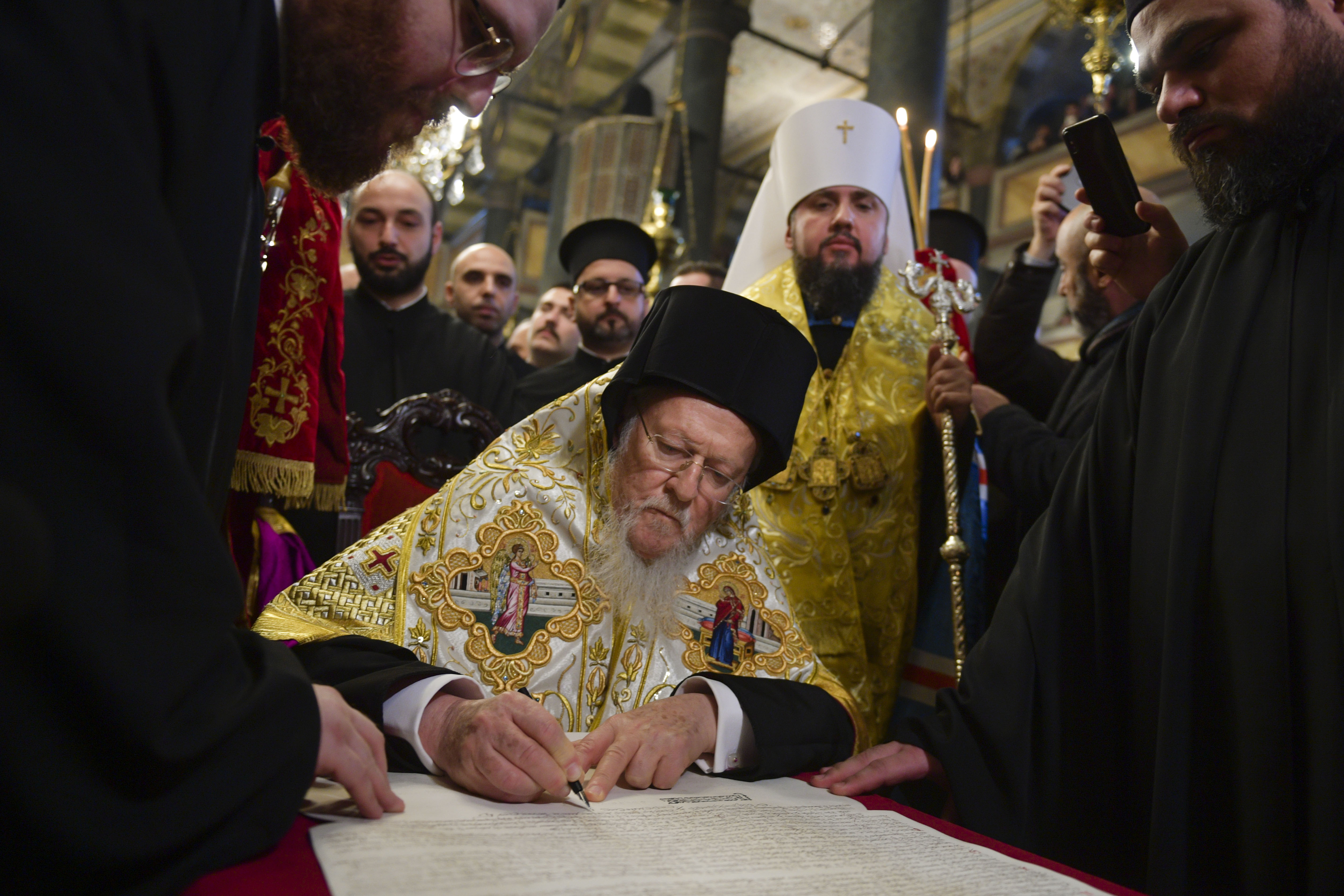
Patriarch Bartholomew signing the tomos, Epiphanius of Kyiv wearing a white klobuk stands behind him

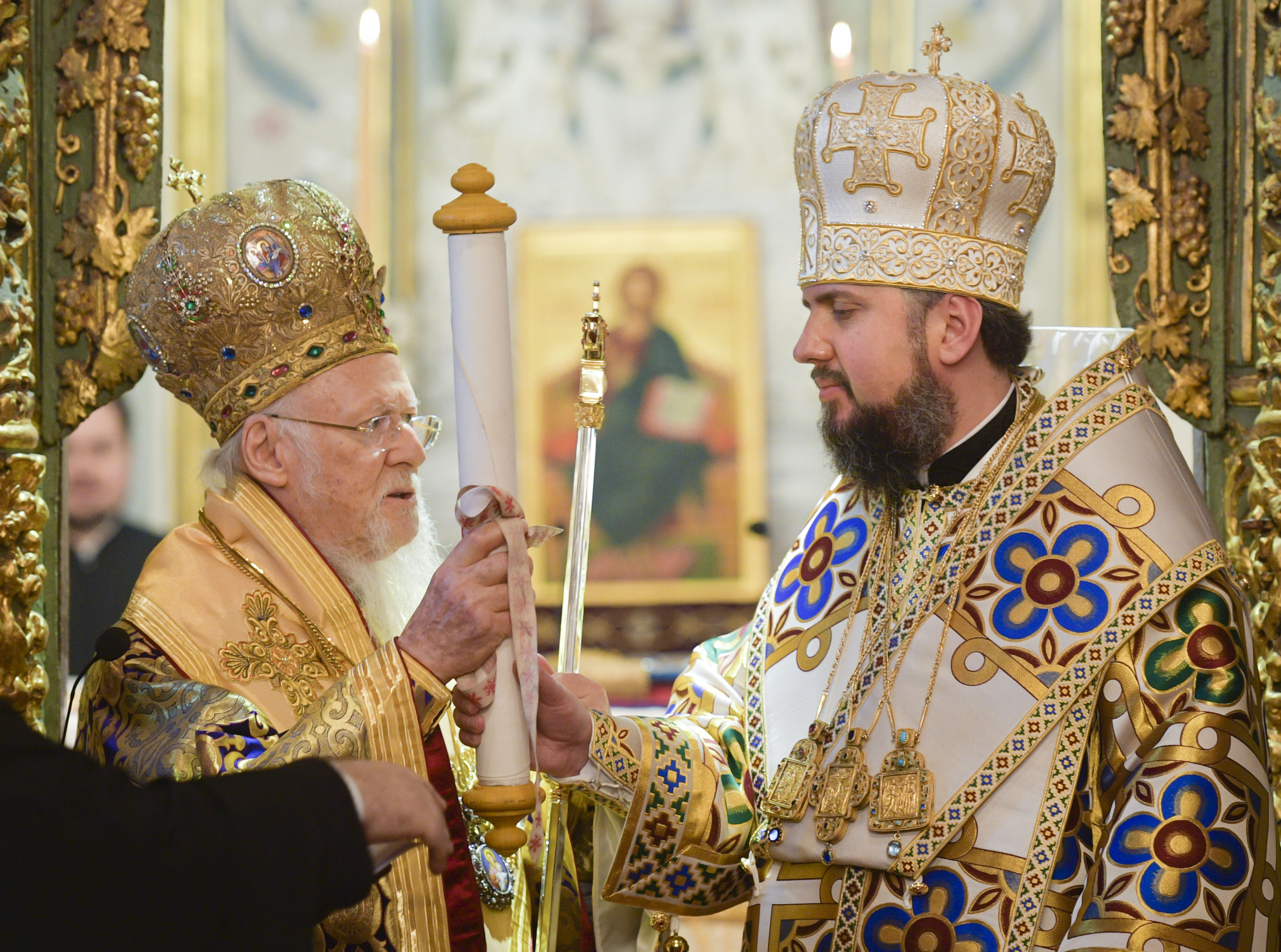
Patriarch Bartholomew (left) handing the tomos to Metropolitan Epiphanius (right)

On 5 January 2019, Bartholomew I of Constantinople and Metropolitan Epiphanius celebrated a Divine Liturgy in St. George's Cathedral in Constantinople. The Tomos was signed thereafter, also in St. George's Cathedral. The Tomos "had come into force from the moment of its signing." The signing of the tomos officially established the autocephalous Orthodox Church of Ukraine.

After the Tomos was signed, Patriarch Batholomew delivered a speech addressing Metropolitan Epiphanius. President Poroshenko and Metropolitan Epiphanius also delivered speeches, Epiphanius addressing Poroshenko by saying this: "Your name, Mr President, will remain forever in the history of the Ukrainian people and the church next to the names of our princes Volodymyr the Great, Yaroslav the Wise, Kostiantyn Ostrozky and Hetman Ivan Mazepa".

On 6 January 2019, after a Divine Liturgy concelebrated by Metropolitan Epiphanius and Patriarch Bartholomew, the latter read out the Tomos of the OCU and then handed it to Metropolitan Epiphanius. President Poroshenko was present during the signing and handing over of the Tomos.

On 7 January 2019, Metropolitan Epiphanius celebrated the Divine Liturgy in Saint Sophia's Cathedral, where the Tomos of autocephaly was exposed during the liturgy. The Tomos was then put on display in the refectory church of Saint Sophia's Cathedral in perpetuity, and exposed for the public and tourists to view daily.

On 8 January 2019, the Tomos was brought back to Istanbul so that all the members of the Holy Synod of the Ecumenical Patriarchate could sign the Tomos. The representative of the press service of the OCU, priest Ivan Sydor, said the Tomos was valid after the signature of the Ecumenical Patriarch, "but according to the procedure, there must also be the signatures of those bishops who take part in the synod of the Constantinople Patriarchate." Former press secretary of the UOC-KP, Eustratius (Zoria) (uk), declared the Ecumenical Patriarch recognised the OCU by signing the tomos of autocephaly and by concelebrating the liturgy with Epiphanius while considering Epiphanius as primate of the OCU. The Tomos was signed by all members of the synod of the Ecumenical Patriarchate on 9 January 2019. The tomos, signed by all members of the synod of the Ecumenical Patriarchate, was brought back to Ukraine on the morning of 10 January 2019.

The Tomos was manufactured on a parchment by the renowned painter and calligrapher of Mount Athos, hieromonk Lucas from the Xenophontos monastery.

President Poroshenko, accompanied by Metropolitan Epiphanius, visited several regions of Ukraine to present the Tomos.

The Ukrainian Minister of education said that in 2019 the tomos of autocephaly would be included in the history manuals of the 11th grade students.

=== Enthronement of the primate and first meeting of the synod ===
It was planned that Epiphanius would be enthroned on 3 February 2019, which is also the date of his 40th birthday. Thereafter, the first synod of the OCU was to take place. The monasteries of Mount Athos refused to send a delegation for the enthronement ceremony "not because the Fathers do not recognise its legitimacy or canonicity, but because they have chosen to stick with what has become official practice and accept invitations only to the enthronement of their ecclesiastical head, the Ecumenical Patriarch." Two abbots of Mount Athos were planned to come at the enthronement but were to be part of the delegation of the Ecumenical Patriarchate. On 1 February, once in Kyiv, Archimandrite Ephrem, one of the two Athonite abbots, was hospitalised in consequence of a heart attack. On 2 February, Archimandrite Ephrem was visited by Metropolitan Epiphanius.

As planned, Epiphanius was enthroned in St. Sophia's Cathedral on 3 February 2019. Absent were delegations from "almost all" other national Orthodox churches. Filaret was not present due to health conditions, so he sent his written congratulations to the primate Epiphanius, Filaret's congratulations were written by him and read at the end of the liturgy. Archimandrite Ephrem, who had been hospitalised on 1 February 2019, was not present at the ceremony of enthronement, but a hieromonk of Ephrem's monastery was present during the ceremony of enthronement. A monk from a skete of the Koutloumousiou Monastery was also present during the ceremony of enthronement.

The first meeting of the Holy Synod of the OCU was held on 5 February 2019.

=== Initial public statements by the primate ===
In an interview published on 13 February 2019, Epiphanius said what were the main task the OCU had to fulfill:

First, to preserve the unity that was proclaimed in the unifying Council. Secondly, pay special attention to formation, which is our future. The third commitment is with the young, which we must know how to attract them [sic] to the Church. Without spiritual formation, in general without development of formation we will not be able to do anything.

On 16 February 2019, the primate of the OCU, Epiphanius, said the OCU would implement reforms "normally and gradually". He gave the example of switching to the Orthodox new calendar. Before that, on 16 December 2018, he had also talked about switching to the Orthodox new calendar.

In an interview published on 1 March 2019, Epiphanius told the BBC:

We must move away from those Russian imperial traditions that have been imposed on us for a long time. When we visit the churches of the Greek tradition, we see that all those traditions existed in the Ukrainian Church even during the time of Peter Mogila ... But everything will be done gradually, so as not to cause resistance from the conservative part of the faithful who do not perceive reforms as such. We are not talking about changing the foundations of faith, dogmatics. We are talking about good reforms. We must engage in enlightenment, explain to people that we must become better, so that love would prevail among us.

In the same interview, when asked if he would allow LGBT people to take communion, Epiphanius declared:

We have a clear position ... this is a sin that we have to ... speak openly about .... This is a way of life that is incompatible with Christian views. Therefore, this is the position of the Orthodox Church, the position of the All-Ukrainian Council of Churches, and in this matter we are unshakable. Because we are based on the foundations of the Scriptures, which clearly states that this is a sin. ... people must repent of their sins, correct their mistakes. And if a person repents, if the person recognises it, then of course the person can participate in the sacraments.

=== Conflict with Filaret ===
A conflict erupted between Filaret Denysenko and Epiphanius in the spring of 2019 over the model of governance, the management of the diaspora, the name, and the statute of the OCU. Around 20 million Ukrainians live in a foreign country and most of them are Orthodox. The U.S.A. and Canada host the most numerous communities. According to Filaret's statement in May 2019, the agreement reached at the Unification Council was as follows: "The primate is responsible for the external representation of the Ukrainian Orthodox Church (UOC), and the patriarch is responsible for the internal church life in Ukraine, but in cooperation with the primate. The primate shall do nothing in the church without the consent of the patriarch. The patriarch chairs the meetings of the Holy Synod and the UOC meetings for the sake of preserving unity, its growth, and affirmation." Filaret said that that agreement had not been fulfilled.

On 20 June 2019, a group of clergy which, apart from Filaret himself, comprised only two bishops, both being from Russia, convened in St. Volodomyr Cathedral in Kyiv and adopted a document that purported to cancel the decisions of the 15 December 2018 unification council; the document stated that the UOC-KP continued to exist and had a state registration, while Filaret remained its head.

On 14 December 2019, Metropolitan Epiphanius informed the Council of Bishops, which was held in Kyiv on the occasion of the anniversary of the creation of the OCU and was not attended by Filaret, that the legal procedure of liquidation (terminarion) of the UAOC as well as the UOC-KP as legal entities had been completed the day before. Among other things, the Council of Bishops made a decision to "urge the Honorable Patriarch Filaret and his followers to seek reconciliation and end self-isolation". Over 15 per cent of Ukrainians would like to have Patriarch Filaret as the Primate of the national and diaspora churches, despite his age and their historical names.

== Church administration ==
=== Local Council (Assembly) ===
According to the OCU's Statute, the highest governing body of the Orthodox Church of Ukraine is its Local Council, which is an assembly of clergy and laity (Article 2, paragraph 1). The Local Council consists of all hierarch, ruling and others, clergy, monks, and laity from each eparchy (diocese), that were elected by eparchial assemblies. The Local Council is convened regularly by its chairman, that is Metropolitan of Kyiv, and the permanent Holy Synod at least once in five years. Also the Local Council may be convened in extraordinary way, always when its chairman wishes. The Local Council elects the Metropolitan of Kyiv out of three candidates proposed by the Hierarchal Assembly (Council of Bishops). The Local Council may approve the Statute and introduce amendments to it. It also approves amendments to the Statute submitted by the Hierarchal Assembly.

=== Council of Bishops and Holy Synod ===
The Holy Hierarchal Assembly (Council of Bishops) consists of the Metropolitan of Kyiv and all eparchial hierarchs (Article 3, paragraph 1).

The permanent Holy Synod of the OCU is to be composed of twelve rotating members and chaired by the Metropolitan of Kyiv. For the duration of the transitional period, three permanent members of the Synod have been appointed: the former Primates of the UOC-KP (Filaret) and the UAOC (Makariy), and the former UOC-MP Metropolitan Symeon (Shostatsky).

=== Primates ===
==== Preceding (within Rzeczpospolita) ====
List of metropolitans of the "Exarchate of Ukraine":

- Job (1620–1631)
- Isaiah (1631–1633) (Note: The hierarchy which was consecrated in 1620 was legalized by the government in a 1632 agreement that permitted both the disuniate Greek Orthodox and uniate Greek Catholic jurisdictions within the Polish–Lithuanian Commonwealth.)
- Peter III (1633–1646) who was the first metropolitan to be recognized by the Crown of Poland
- Sylvester (1647–1657)
- Dionisius II (1657–1663) who transferred the episcopal seat from Kyiv to Chyhyryn due to Muscovite military incursions
- Joseph V, 1663–1675
  - Anton Vinnicky, (anti-Metropolitan) 1663–1679
- vacant 1679–1685

Appointed by Romanov civil authorities (residence in Kyiv):

- Locum Tenens Lazar Baranovych, 1659–1661
- Locum Tenens Methodius Filimonovich, 1661–1668
- Locum Tenens Lazar Baranovych, 1670–1685

Annexation of the Metropolitanate of Kyiv by the Moscow Patriarchate

==== Current (Ukraine) ====
- Epiphanius of Kyiv, 2019–

== Dioceses ==
As of late March 2019, the following statute of diocesan administrations had been registered within the OCU's jurisdiction:

1. Vinnytsia-Tulchyn diocese of the UOC (OCU), previously UOC-KP, Vinnytsia
2. Vinnytsia-Bar diocese of the UOC (OCU), previously UOC-MP, Vinnytsia
3. Vinnytsia-Bratslav diocese of the UOC (OCU), previously UAOC, Vinnytsia
4. Volynskyi diocese of the UOC (OCU), previously UOC-KP, Lutsk
5. Volodymyr-Volynskyi diocese of the UOC (OCU), previously UOC-KP, Volodymyr-Volynskyi
6. Dnipropetrovsk diocese of the UOC (OCU), previously UOC-KP, Dnipro
7. Donetsk diocese of the UOC (OCU), previously UOC-KP, Mariupol
8. Donetsk-Sloviansk diocese of the UOC (OCU), previously UAOC, Sloviansk
9. Zhytomyr-Ovruch diocese of the UOC (OCU), previously UOC-KP, Zhytomyr
10. Zhytomyr-Polissia diocese of the UOC (OCU), previously UAOC, Zhytomyr
11. Zakarpattia diocese of the UOC (OCU), previously UOC-KP, Mukachevo
12. Mukachevo-Carpathian diocese of the UOC (OCU), previously UAOC, Uzhhorod
13. Uzhhorod-Khust diocese of the UOC (OCU), previously UAOC, Uzhhorod
14. Zaporizhzhia diocese of the UOC (OCU), previously UOC-KP, Zaporizhzhia
15. Ivano-Frankivsk diocese of the UOC (OUC), previously UAOC, Ivano-Frankivsk
16. Ivano-Frankivsk-Halych diocese of the UOC (OUC), previously UOC-KP, Ivano-Frankivsk
17. Kolomyia diocese of the UOC (OCU), previously UOC-KP, Kolomyia
18. Kyiv diocese of the UOC (OCU), previously UOC-KP, Kyiv (central diocese)
19. Pereiaslav-Vyshneve diocese of the UOC (OCU), Kyiv
20. Crimean diocese of the UOC (OCU), previously UOC-KP, Simferopol (temporarily persecuted by Russian administration)
21. Kropyvnytskyi diocese of the UOC (OCU), previously UOC-KP, Kropyvnytskyi
22. Luhansk diocese of the UOC (OCU), previously UOC-KP, Severdonetsk
23. Lviv diocese of the UOC (OCU), previously UAOC, Lviv
24. Lviv-Sokal diocese of the UOC (OCU), previously UOC-KP, Lviv
25. Drohobych-Sambir diocese of the UOC (OCU), previously UOC-KP, Drohobych
26. Mykolaiv diocese of the UOC (OCU), previously UOC-KP, Mykolaiv
27. Odesa diocese of the UOC (OCU), previously UOC-KP, Odesa
28. Poltava diocese of the UOC (OCU), previously UOC-KP, Poltava
29. Rivne diocese of the UOC (OCU), previously UOC-KP, Rivne
30. Rivne-Volyn diocese of the UOC (OCU), previously UAOC, Rivne
31. Sumy diocese of the UOC (OCU), previously UOC-KP, Sumy
32. Taurida diocese of the UOC (OCU), previously UAOC, Kherson
33. Kherson diocese of the UOC (OCU), previously UOC-KP, Kherson
34. Ternopil diocese of the UOC (OCU), previously UOC-KP, Ternopil
35. Ternopil-Buchach diocese of the UOC (OCU), previously UAOC, Ternopil
36. Ternopil-Terebovlia diocese of the UOC (OCU), previously UOC-KP, Kobylovoloky
37. Kharkiv diocese of the UOC (OCU), previously UOC-KP, Kharkiv
38. Kharkiv-Poltava diocese of the UOC (OCU), previously UAOC, Poltava
39. Khmelnytskyi diocese of the UOC (OCU), previously UOC-KP, Khmelnytskyi
40. Cherkasy diocese of the UOC (OCU), previously UOC-KP, Cherkasy
41. Chernihiv diocese of the UOC (OCU), previously UOC-KP, Chernihiv
42. Chernivtsi diocese of the UOC (OCU), previously UOC-KP, Chernivtsi
43. Chernivtsi-Kitsman diocese of the UOC (OCU), previously UOC-KP, Chernivtsi
44. Chernivtsi-Khotyn diocese of the UOC (OCU), previously UAOC, Chernivtsi
- Pereiaslav-Bila Tserkva diocese of the UOC (OCU), previously UOC-KP, Kyiv (merged with Kyiv diocese)
- Theotokos diocese (UOC-KP), not fully regulated
- Dnipropetrovsk-Zaporizhzhia diocese (UAOC), not registered
- Khmelnytskyi diocese (UAOC), not registered
- Cherkasy-Kirovohrad diocese (UAOC), not registered
- Kyiv diocese (UAOC), not registered
- Lviv-Sambir diocese (UAOC), not registered
- West European exarchate (UAOC), undetermined
- East Moldovan diocese (UOC-KP), turned to the Romanian Orthodox Church
- European exarchate (UOC-KP), abandoned
  - Paris diocese (UOC-KP), abandoned
- Russian exarchate (UOC-KP), abandoned
  - Belgorod diocese (UOC-KP), abandoned
- Odesa-Black Sea diocese (UAOC), not registered before unification

According to the information presented by Metropolitan Epiphanius of Kyiv and All Ukraine in December 2019, the total number of the dioceses in the OCU stood at 44.

== External relations ==
=== Relations with domestic and international state officials ===
==== Government of Ukraine ====
During various official speeches, Poroshenko stressed the importance of Ukraine receiving its tomos of autocephaly which Ukraine "deserved", is the equivalent of "a charter of [Ukraine's] spiritual independence", was comparable to a referendum on Ukraine's independence and would be "another pillar of Ukrainian independence". On the 27th anniversary of the referendum on independence of Ukraine, Poroshenko declared the tomos of autocephaly was the equivalent of Ukraine saying "'Away from Moscow!' – 'Europe now!'"

On 15 December 2018, Poroshenko made a speech after Epiphanius' election, in which he said the autocephalous church would be "without Putin, without Kirill", but "with God and with Ukraine". He added autocephaly was "part of our state pro-European and pro-Ukrainian strategy".

On 6 January, after the OCU had received its tomos, President Poroshenko declared: "His All-Holiness Ecumenical Patriarch Bartholomew already has a special place in the history of Ukraine. With all that he did, due to his wisdom and leadership, his devotion to Ukraine and Orthodoxy, I would say that His All-Holiness will be considered a co-founder of a new Ukraine. This is a very special and historic mission".

On 7 January 2019, Ukrainian President Petro Poroshenko said that Ukraine, with the creation of the autocephalous Orthodox Church of Ukraine, has finally severed ties with Russia. He added: "The creation of the autocephalous Orthodox Church of Ukraine is the pledge of our independence. This is the foundation of our spiritual freedom. We've severed the last ties that connected us with Moscow and its fantasies about Ukraine as the canonical territory of the Russian Orthodox Church. This is not and won't be anymore." He made this declaration at the Christmas liturgy in St. Sophia Cathedral in Kyiv where the tomos of autocephaly of the Orthodox Church of Ukraine was shown to the public.

==== Government of Russia ====
On 12 October 2018, the press service of the president of Russia made it known that the issue of the Russian Orthodox Church (ROC) in Ukraine was the subject of deliberations at the situational meeting Russia's president had with the permanent members of the Security Council of Russia The president's spokesman Dmitry Peskov commented that the Kremlin supported the ROC's position and was ready to defend "the Orthodox faithful in Ukraine".

On 17 December 2018, it was reported that the Federal Security Service of Russia, along with members of the Moscow Patriarchate, allegedly had created mobile groups to prevent communities in Ukraine from switching from the UOC-MP to the OCU. Those groups are present in each diocese of the UOC-MP and are composed of a lawyer and several men.

On 20 December, Russia's president Vladimir Putin condemned the creation of the OCU. In an interview for Serbia's two major dailies published on 16 January 2019 on the official website of the president of Russia, Putin said the creation of the OCU and its official establishment via the Tomos was an attempt "to legalize the schismatic communities that exist[ed] in Ukraine under the jurisdiction of Istanbul, which is a gross violation of Orthodox canons".

On 6 November 2019, following the talks with his Greek counterpart Nikos Dendias, shortly after the Moscow Patriarchate severed communion with the Church of Greece in retaliation to the latter's recognition of the OCU, Russia's foreign minister Sergei Lavrov told a press conference that he believed that the OCU's recognition was predicated on the efforts of the U.S. Government and personally secretary of state Mike Pompeo.

==== Government of Canada ====
On 8 January 2019, Canada's Foreign Minister Chrystia Freeland congratulated the OCU for receiving its tomos of autocephaly.

==== Government of the United States ====
On 15 December, the U.S. embassy in Kyiv congratulated, via Twitter, Ukraine for having elected the primate of the Orthodox Church of Ukraine. On 17 December, the U.S. Department of State officially congratulated Metropolitan Epiphanius on his election.

On 10 January 2019, the U.S. State Department headed by Secretary of State Mike Pompeo released a statement:

The January 6th announcement of autocephaly for an independent Orthodox Church of Ukraine marks a historic achievement as Ukraine seeks to chart its own future. On this momentous occasion, the United States reiterates its unwavering support for a sovereign, independent Ukraine. The United States maintains its strong support for religious freedom, including the freedom for members of religious groups to govern their religion according to their beliefs, without external interference. We welcome remarks by Metropolitan Epiphaniy that the Orthodox Church of Ukraine is open to all Orthodox believers and encourage government and Church officials to promote tolerance and respect for the freedom of members of all religious affiliations to worship as they choose.

==== Government of Syria ====
Syrian President Bashar al-Assad was quoted by Dmitry Sablin, member of a delegation of the Russian parliament, as saying: "Attempts to divide believers are one of the most serious challenges not only for you, but also for us. Today we see attempts to divide the church on our soil as well, that is, an attempt to divide the Church of Antioch in Syria and Lebanon." Assad noted in particular that granting independence to the Lebanese Metropolitanate was being discussed and said that "the continuation of that process could follow."

=== Recognition by the other Eastern Orthodox churches ===
Current status of the 2018 schism by Orthodox Church jurisdiction. Recognises OCU autocephaly Concelebrated with or commemorated OCU primate in Divine Liturgy diptych No definitive statements yet on OCU Does not recognise OCU autocephaly Territorial disputes between Moscow Patriarchate (MP) and Ecumenical Patriarchate of Constantinople or Romanian Orthodox Church.

Church	Official recognition of the OCU	First concelebration with OCU hierarchs or commemoration of its Primate in the diptych
Ecumenical Patriarchate of Constantinople	6 January 2019	5 January 2019
Greek Orthodox Patriarchate of Alexandria	8 November 2019	11 September 2019
Antiochian Orthodox Church	-	-
Greek Orthodox Patriarchate of Jerusalem	-	3 September 2023
Russian Orthodox Church	-	-
Serbian Orthodox Church	(rejected: 13 March 2019)	-
Romanian Orthodox Church	-	25 October 2021, 24 September 2023
Bulgarian Orthodox Church	-	27 November 2019, 26 December 2021, 19 May 2024
Georgian Orthodox Church	-	-
Church of Cyprus	24 October 2020 (Note: 25 November 2020 confirmed by synod)	30 November 2019
Church of Greece	12 October 2019	26 July 2019
Polish Orthodox Church	(conditions not satisfied: 2 April 2019, 26 October 2021)	-
Albanian Orthodox Church	-	-
Orthodox Church of the Czech Lands and Slovakia	-	20 November 2019
Macedonian Orthodox Church - Archdiocese of Ohrid	-	(postponed: 28 March 2023)

==== Recognition ====
===== Ecumenical Patriarchate =====
On 24 December 2018, the Ecumenical Patriarchate sent a letter to the primates of the autocephalous Eastern Orthodox churches to ask them to recognise the OCU.

On Sunday 16 December 2018, the next day after the election of Epiphanius as primate of the OCU, the Ecumenical Patriarch commemorated him during a Divine Liturgy, along with the other primates of the other Orthodox churches. On 8 January 2019, the Ecumenical Patriarch sent a letter to all the hierarchs of the Ecumenical Patriarchate to ask them to commemorate Epiphanius in the diptych. On 23 January 2019, the OCU appeared on one of the official websites of the Ecumenical Patriarchate, under the category "autocephalous churches".

===== Patriarchate of Alexandria =====
In June 2019, Patriarch Theodore II of Alexandria told Greece's newspaper Ethnos that the Ecumenical Patriarch had the right to grant autocephaly but talks between the two patriarchates involved were for reconciliation of the faithful in Ukraine.

On 12 September 2019, in the village of Ossa near Thessaloniki, a liturgy was concelebrated by the hierarchs of the Patriarchate of Constantinople, the Church of Greece (the Metropolis of Langadas) as well as Bishop Volodymyr Shlapak of the Church of Ukraine and the hierarch of the Bishop of Mozambique Chrysostom Karangunis of the Patriarchate of Alexandria. The concelebration was interpreted by the OCU as de facto recognition of the OCU on the part of the Church of Alexandria.

On 8 November 2019, the Patriarchate of Alexandria, ranked second in the diptych of the Eastern Orthodox Churches of the world, officially announced it had recognized the Orthodox Church of Ukraine, and Patriarch Theodore II commemorated the Metropolitan of Kyiv Epiphanius during the liturgy in the Archangels Cathedral in Cairo. Thereafter, the Patriarch of Alexandria sent a reply letter to Epiphanius; this move confirmed the full communion between the two churches.

===== Church of Greece =====
On 8 January 2019, the Permanent Synod of the Church of Greece decided that the issue of recognition of the OCU would be dealt with by the Synod of the Hierarchy of the Church of Greece.

In early March 2019, the Permanent Synod discussed the Ukrainian issue and assigned it to two synodical committees for examination and appropriate recommendations. The Archbishop of Athens and All Greece Ieronymos II told the media that the Synod of the Hierarchy would discuss Ukraine at its session to be held on 19–20 March 2019. However, the issue of the OCU was not discussed.

On 10 June, Archbishop Ieronymos II of Athens attended Great Vespers with Metropolitan Epiphanius. On 14 July, Metropolitan Ignatius of Demetrias and Volos visited the Ecumenical Patriarch. He declared that Patriarch Bartholomew had the right to grant Autocephaly to Ukraine, and that the Volos Theological Academy accepts students from OCU academies.

On 28 July, at the 1,031st-anniversary celebration of the Baptism of Rus-Ukraine, Metropolitan Ioannis of Langada represented the Church of Greece and concelebrated with Metropolitan Epiphany. Earlier, Archbishop Germanos of Chernivtsi concelebrated with Greek and Constantinopolitan hierarchs in Thessaloniki.

On 28 August, Greek media sources reported that the Church of Greece supported the autocephaly of the OCU. On 28 August 2019, the Standing Holy Synod of the Church of Greece stated that the Ecumenical Patriarch had the right to grant autocephaly, and that the primate of the Church of Greece had the "privilege ... to further deal with the question of recognition of the Church of Ukraine". While the Holy Synod had not formally recognized the OCU's autocephaly, Epiphanius argued that the OCU had an honorary recognition.

On 7 October 2019, "a day before the start of the proceedings of the Synod of the Hierarchy of the Church of Greece, [the Archbishop of Athens] informed in a letter the Body of Hierarchs that he would add another extraordinary meeting this coming Saturday regarding exclusively the Ukrainian issue." This meeting was scheduled for 12 October 2019.

On 12 October 2019, the Synod of Hierarchs of the Church of Greece, with 7 bishops stating their objections, acknowledged that "the Ecumenical Patriarchate of Constantinople has the right to grant autocephalies" and empowered Archbishop Ieronymos II to act on the issue of the OCU's autocephaly accordingly. During the debate preceding the recognition, more than 35 Metropolitans of the Church of Greece said they had been pressured by the ROC but did not yield to it. Epiphanius thanked the Church of Greece as well as its primate for this decision.

According to news media reports, it had been tentatively expected that the formal act of recognition of the OCU would take place on 19 October "in Thessaloniki where Archbishop Ieronymos and Metropolitan Epiphanius w[ould] possibly concelebrate the Divine Liturgy." On 19 October, the Ecumenical Patriarch Bartholomew and Archbishop Ieronymos II of Athens jointly celebrated a liturgy in the Church of the Acheiropoietos in Thessaloniki, Greece, at which Metropolitan Epiphanius' name was commemorated by the Patriarch. The fact was interpreted by the Greek news outlets as a definitive acknowledgement (recognition) of Epiphanius by the Church of Greece. At the end of his speech after the liturgy, Patriarch Bartholomew thanked Archbishop Ieronymos for having identified with the canonical decisions of the Ecumenical Patriarchate and having inscribed the name of Metropolitan Epiphanius of Kyiv and All Ukraine in the Diptychs. A spokesman of the Moscow Patriarchate contested the interpretation of the concelebration as recognition of the OCU by the Church of Greece pointing up the fact that Epiphanius' name was not said directly by the Archbishop.

On 21 October 2019, Archbishop Ieronymos II, the Primate of the Church of Greece, sent a peaceful letter to Metropolitan Epiphanius, the Primate of the OCU. The Archbishop's letter meant that the Church of Greece had officially communicated to the OCU that the Church of Greece had recognized it. On Sunday 10 November 2019, Archbishop Ieronymos II commemorated Epiphanius during a liturgy, thus confirming the recognition of the OCU.

On 10 December 2019, the former Minister of Defence in the Alexis Tsipras government, Panos Kammenos, admitted that he had put pressure to bear on Archbishop Ieronymos II by telling him, when in office, that Russia would withdraw what he called "guarantees" to Greece to preclude occupation by Turkey of Greek islands such as Kastellorizo, Lemnos and others in the Eastern Aegean in the event that the Church of Greece recognised the Church of Ukraine before the Patriarchates of Jerusalem and Alexandria did so. The following day, apparently in response to Kammenos' allegations that the recognition of the UOC by the Church of Greece had resulted from pressure on the part of "some American circles", the Standing Holy Synod of the Church of Greece stated in an official communiqué that the decision to recognise the autocephaly of the Church of Ukraine proclaimed by the Ecumenical Patriarchate had been made freely and without coercion and was "entirely within the canonical and ecclesiastical tradition and ha[d] nothing to do with nationalism and other ‘from above’ interventions as ha[d] been propagated by some".

===== Church of Cyprus =====
In his public statements made in early January 2019, the primate of the Church of Cyprus, Archbishop Chrysostomos II, stressed the importance of avoiding division in the Orthodox Church; he acknowledged that any national state was entitled to have an autocephalous church and that it was up to the Ukrainian people; he also said he would not commemorate the name of the primate of the Orthodox Church of Ukraine in the diptych. Later in January 2019, Archbishop Chrysostomos was reported to have said that he regarded the Ecumenical Patriarchate of Constantinople as the Mother church and that he enjoyed good relations with the Phanar, which he was determined to preserve any difficulties notwithstanding; he also welcomed the desire of Metropolitan Epiphanius to have concelebration and said he would one day concelebrate with Metropolitan Epiphanius in Cyprus.

On 7 February 2019, the Holy Synod of the Church of Cyprus decided that it would hold an extraordinary session on 18 February 2019 to make the definitive decision concerning the Ukrainian question. On 18 February, the Church of Cyprus announced she did not doubt the goals of granting autocephaly in Ukraine was to heal the schism in Ukraine; the Church of Cyprus also stated that if the schism in Ukraine was not overcome within a certain timeframe, the Church of Cyprus "expect[ed] that the Ecumenical Patriarch, making use of his regulatory role given to him by his position as First in Orthodoxy, w[ould] convene either a Pan-Orthodox Council or a Synaxis of the Primates to act upon the matter." In the same communiqué, the Church of Cyprus said she was offering herself as a mediator on the issue. The Church of Cyprus did not state it had recognised the OCU.

In an interview published by the Cypriot newspaper Politis in mid‐December 2019, Archbishop Chrysostomos II criticised the three bishops of his Church, namely Athanasios Nikolaou of Limassol, Nikiphoros Kykkotis of Kykkos, and Isaias Kykkotis of Tamassos, for having derogated from the decision he said had been made by the Synod of the Church of Cyprus that committed her to neutrality on the issue of Ukraine, by making public statements in support of Moscow. The Archbishop also condemned the moves undertaken by Patriarch Kirill of Moscow such as not commemorating the Ecumenical Patriarch, the Archbishop of Athens, and the Patriarch of Alexandria as well as Kirill's aspiration motivated by egoism to illegitimately achieve primacy in Orthodoxy as leading to schism.

On 7 January 2020, the Divine Liturgy in St George Patriarchal Cathedral in Istanbul presided over by the Ecumenical Patriarchate Bartholomew was concelebrated, among others, by Metropolitan Makariy Maletych (the OCU) and Metropolitan Chrysostomos Constantinos Kykkotis of Kyrenia (the Church of Cyprus).

On 24 October 2020, the primate of the Church of Cyprus, Archbishop Chrysostomos II, commemorated Epiphanius of Ukraine during the Divine Liturgy, thus recognising the OCU. Archbishop Chrysostomos, while acknowledging the fact that some members of his Church's Holy Synod had disagreed with him and had not been told about his decision to commemorate the OCU's primate, explained that he had to take a position and that his move was meant to serve above all Orthodox Christianity and the Church rather than the Church of Cyprus, or individuals. On 25 November 2020, the Holy Synod of the Church of Cyprus decided "not to oppose" the decision of the Archbishop of Cyprus to recognise the OCU.

==== Unrecognition ====
===== Church of Antioch =====
The primate of the Greek Orthodox Church of Antioch answered to the 24 December 2018 letter of the Ecumenical Patriarch by asking the Ecumenical Patriarch to postpone the grant of autocephaly to the Orthodox Church of Ukraine.

===== Russian Orthodox Church (Moscow Patriarchate) =====
On 15 December, after the election of Epiphanius at the unification council, archpriest Nikolay Balashov, deputy head of the Moscow Patriarchate Department for External Church Relations, told Interfax that this election "means nothing" for the Russian Orthodox Church. Following the Unification Council, the Patriarch of Moscow sent letters to the Primates of all the autocephalous Orthodox Churches (but not to the Ecumenical Patriarchate nor to the OCU), urging them not to recognise the OCU insisting that those who had joined the OCU remained "schismatics". On 30 December 2018, the synod of the ROC declared the unification council of the OCU "uncanonical" and appealed to the primates and synods of the other local Orthodox churches not to recognise the OCU.

Having unilaterally severed Eucharistic communion with the See of Constantinople on 15 October 2018, weeks before the formal granting of autocephaly to the OCU, the Moscow Patriarchate following the subsequent recognitions of the OCU on the part of the Church of Greece (October 2019) and the Patriarchate of Alexandria (November 2019) severed eucharistic communion with the primate of the Church of Greece and announced it would stop commemorating the Patriarche of Alexandria. Severance of communion with Patriarch Theodore II of Alexandria and the like-minded bishops of his Patriarchate was confirmed by the decision of the Holy Synod of the ROC of 26 December 2019, which also decreed that the representation of the Patriarch of Moscow in Cairo be turned into a parish and the "Russian" parishes in Africa be transferred under direct jurisdiction of the Patriarch of Moscow as stauropegia. On 27 December 2019, the Divine Liturgy was celebrated by the ROC representative in the church of Demetrius of Thessaloniki in the Zeitoun district of Cairo, Egypt, for the last time, as the church was being handed back to the Patriarchate of Alexandria.

===== Georgian Orthodox Church =====
In February 2019, the Patriarchate of the Georgian Orthodox Church issued a statement that rejected what they saw as pressure and threats on the part of the ROC on the Ukrainian issue. Later in 2019, a number of bishops of the Church of Greece as well as of other autocephalous churches stated that they had been subjected to a campaign of intimidation and blackmail on the part of the Moscow Patriarchate with a view to preventing them from recognizing the Ukrainian autocephaly. This followed a Moscow-orchestrated defamation campaign personally against the Ecumenical Patriarch Bartholomew.

On the other hand, the Georgian Orthodox Church did recognise the autocephaly of the Macedonian Orthodox Church in February 2023. Georgian scholars explained the attitude of the Georgian Orthodox Church as one that did not dare disagreeing with the Moscow Patriarchate on Ukraine-related matters out of fear of angering the Russian Orthodox Church.

===== Serbian Orthodox Church =====
On 13 March 2019, a document titled "The Position of the Serbian Orthodox Church on the church crisis in Ukraine" was posted on behalf of the office of the Holy Synod of the Serbian Orthodox Church reiterating the previously voiced intention not to recognise the legitimacy of the OCU's hierarchy that had been communicated in November 2018 by Bishop Irinej Bulović of Bačka, the spokesman of the SOC, in the name of the Council ("Assembly") of Bishops of the Serbian Orthodox Church. Among other things, the 13 March 2019 document, which pointedly referred to Kyiv as "the mother of all Russian cities", recommended that the Serbian clergy refrain from any communion with those who were in communion with "Mr Epiphanius Dumenko and his followers". The identical document in Russian had been published by the Moscow Patriarchate's official web site around two weeks prior.

In May 2019, the Council of Bishops re-affirmed the Church's stance on Ukraine stating in the publication posted by Irinej Bulović: "[T]he Assembly's present position remains: our Church does not recognize the newly established false-church structure in Ukraine, led by the citizens of Denysenko and Dumenko, and is only and exclusively in liturgical and canonical communion with the canonical Ukrainian Orthodox Church, led by His Beatitude Metropolitan Onufry, and with all the other canonical Orthodox Churches".

===== Romanian Orthodox Church =====
On 21 February 2019, the Holy Synod of the Romanian Orthodox Church discussed the Ukrainian question and declared in a communiqué:

Regarding this tense ecclesiastical situation in Ukraine, the Holy Synod of the Romanian Orthodox Church reiterates its stance expressed during its previous working sessions of 24 May and 25 October 2018. It was then recommended that, through dialogue, the Ecumenical Patriarchate and the Moscow Patriarchate identify a solution to this ecclesiastical dispute by preserving the unity of faith, by respecting the administrative and pastoral freedom of the clergy and faithful in this country (including the right to autocephaly), and by restoring Eucharistic communion. In the event of an unsuccessful bilateral dialogue, it is necessary to convene a Synaxis of all Primates of Orthodox Churches to solve the existing problem.

The Romanian Orthodox Church also stated in the same communiqué: that once the schism in Ukraine has been healed, once the Ecumenical Patriarchate and the Moscow Patriarchate have settled their dispute over Ukraine, once the Romanian Orthodox Church has "written assurances from Ukrainian ecclesiastical and state authorities that the ethnic and linguistic identity of [the 127 Romanian Orthodox parishes in Ukraine currently administered by the UOC-MP] will be respected, and that these Romanian Orthodox will have the possibility to organise themselves within a Romanian Orthodox Vicariate and to be able to cultivate spiritual relations with the Romanian Patriarchate", and once the Ecumenical Patriarchate has clarified "the problem of the non-canonical hierarchs and priests in the West, who belonged to the former "Kyiv Patriarchate", then "the Holy Synod will express its official position on the situation of Orthodoxy in Ukraine."

In March 2019, Epiphanius declared that he was in favor of creating a Romanian vicariate and that they "will discuss everything".

The vicariate failed to attract the Romanian-language parishes from Ukraine, due to fears of Ukrainianization. As of 2026, the vicariate had no appointed vicar, no affiliated parishes and no parishioners. As such, due to the Russian invasion of Ukraine, many ethnic Romanian priests from Ukraine submitted a request to join the Romanian Patriarchy. The Holy Synod of the Romanian Orthodox Church responded by creating, on February 29, 2024, the Romanian Orthodox Church in Ukraine. The Ukrainian authorities, however, refused to register it and also banned Eugen Patraș, the Ukrainian-born Romanian lawyer who attempted to register the Romanian Church in Ukraine, from entering Ukraine for 3 years. Metropolitan Epiphanius criticized the intention of the Romanian Patriarchate to expand in Ukraine:

Just as internationally our state consistently supports the principle "nothing about Ukraine without Ukraine", the principle "nothing about Orthodoxy in Ukraine without the Orthodox Church of Ukraine" must also be respected. Our path toward the affirmation of autocephaly was long, difficult, full of suffering and martyrdom. No one, neither from the outside nor from the inside, has the right to ignore or despise all of this [...] We emphasize once again the principles already expressed in our previous decisions: the Orthodox Church of Ukraine is ready and willing to offer believers of Romanian ethnicity in Ukraine, within its own jurisdiction, the same rights of church self-governance that Ukrainians have within the Romanian Orthodox Church [...] A parallel structure imposed without respecting the Tomos of autocephaly will not bring good to the Romanians in Ukraine, but only a deepening of problems and divisions [...] If even on the territory of Moldova, where there are no linguistic or ethnic divisions, despite all the efforts made by the Romanian Patriarchate over the past three decades, a deep church division continues to exist, this challenge is all the more current for Ukraine.

— Metropolitan Epiphanius on the Romanian Orthodox Church in Ukraine

Bishop Feohnost Bodoreak of Chernivtsi also criticized the idea: "I doubt that the Romanian Orthodox Church would want to violate church canons and create its own church in another country. They are not Russians."

Subsequently, several priests stated to Radio Free Europe, under the condition of anonymity, that they had been threatened with forced conscription into the Ukrainian Armed Forces if they continued their efforts to affiliate with the Romanian Patriarchate.

===== Polish Orthodox Church =====
On 2 April 2019, the assembly of bishops of the Polish Orthodox Church released a communiqué. In it, it reiterated its stance taken 9 May and 15 November 2018. The communiqué says "that the Polish Autocephalous Orthodox Church was and is in favour of granting full independence – autocephaly – to the Orthodox Church in Ukraine", and that autocephaly should be given "according to the dogmatic and canonical norms of the whole Church, and not of a group of schismatics. Those who left the Church and have been deprived of their priestly ordination, cannot represent a healthy ecclesial body. It is an uncanonical act, violating the Eucharistic and inter-Orthodox unity." The decision of the Assembly on the OCU was reaffirmed on 26 October 2021. On 9–11 December 2024, the Primate Epiphanius and representatives of the OCU participated in the European Consultation on a just peace in Ukraine in Warsaw; on 2 February 2025, the OCU Synod expressed "deep regret" over the fact that the leaders of the Polish Orthodox Church did not attend this peace conference.

===== Orthodox Church in America (OCA) =====
On 28 January 2019, the Holy Synod of Bishops of the Orthodox Church in America (OCA) released a statement rejecting "recognition of the Orthodox Church of Ukraine", instructing those within the OCA that "no changes be made to the diptychs". However, the OCA maintains communion with both the Church of Moscow and the Church of Constantinople, the latter including the Greek Orthodox Archdiocese of America.

=== Relations with religious bodies outside of Eastern Orthodoxy ===
==== Catholic Church ====
The head of the Conference of Roman Catholic Bishops of Ukraine congratulated Epiphanius on his election in the name of the Roman Catholic bishops of Ukraine.

Major Archbishop Shevchuk of the Ukrainian Greek Catholic Church (UGCC) congratulated the Orthodox Ukrainians on the formation of the OCU and said it was a "historic moment for Christians in Ukraine". On 18 December 2018, Shevchuck sent a letter of congratulation, in the name of both the UGCC and in his own name, to Metropolitan Epiphanius and said the election of Epiphanius was "God's gift on the way to the complete unity of the churches of Volodymyr's Baptism".

However, in an interview published at the end of December 2019 on Radio Liberty, Major Archbishop Shevchuk said there was "no process of unification of the UGCC with the OCU".

==== Protestantism ====
Concerning the formation of the OCU, the Seventh-day Adventist Church "takes a positive stance towards all the movements and activities that have served the unification of people, the search for ways of peaceful coexistence and understanding".

==== Judaism ====
Rabbi Oleksandr, head of the Religious Association of Progressive Judaism Communities of Ukraine, congratulated Orthodox Ukrainians for the receiving of the tomos of autocephaly.

==== Islam ====
Said Ismagilov, Mufti of the Religious Administration of Muslims of Ukraine sent a congratulatory message to Epiphanius after the latter's election. On 6 January 2019, Said congratulated the Eastern Orthodox Christians for the receiving of the tomos by Ukraine.

== Reforms ==
The Orthodox Church of Ukraine plans to introduce a number of new rules in churches. In particular, innovations currently being discussed by bishops include permission for women to enter the church with their heads uncovered, the installation of benches for seating in churches, and permission for the burial of Catholics.

Certain innovations are also introduced in church music. For example, during the celebration of Easter 2019 in St. Michael's Golden-Domed Cathedral, a bell rang, written and performed by students of the Kyiv Orthodox Theological Academy.

On 20 May 2019, Metropolitan of Cherkasy and Chyhyryn OCU Ioan (Yaremenko) announced that membership in the Orthodox Church of Ukraine is being introduced "on an applicant basis". Each parish will have an open register of its members who are actively involved in the religious, educational, financial, economic and charitable activities of the community.

=== Calendar ===
The Gregorian calendar has been adopted as the civil calendar on 15 October 1582 in Western Ukraine and on 14 February 1918 in Eastern Ukraine, causing a gap between the Orthodox Church calendar and the civil one.

Commenting on possible changes in the church calendar, Metropolitan Epiphanius during 2019–2020 repeatedly stressed that they should take place gradually, as a result of educational work and corresponding changes in society's views. Reacting to the decision of Metropolitan Mykhailo of Lutsk and Volyn (some other bishops took the same initiative) to celebrate Christmas twice, on 25 December and 7 January, the Holy Synod of the OCU decided on 4 February 2020, that:

When some Orthodox in Ukraine are under the influence of the Moscow Patriarchate, and taking into account the experience of 'old calendar schisms' in other Local Churches ... ill-considered and hasty implementation of the current calendar reform in the Orthodox Church of Ukraine may lead to the consolidation of existing divisions and the emergence of new ones.

However, the Synod of the OCU allowed to perform on 25 December with the blessing of the ruling bishop prayers with the akathist at Christmas and carols.

In December 2021, the primate of the Orthodox Church of Ukraine, Metropolitan Epiphanius, expressed hope in an interview with Radio Svoboda that for the next 10 years, most Ukrainians could switch to celebrating Christmas on 25 December:

We are called to carry out, first of all, educational work. Although we celebrate the 25th, just on different calendars. Yes, this error will need to be corrected. But tradition is a tradition – it is so ingrained that if we move on, in most cases, I am convinced, the churches of the 25th will be empty and the 7th full.

And that is why it is necessary for the people to mature to this, to come consciously, and when we are all together. But this process is gradually, as we see, continuing, increasing the number of supporters of change. I think that over the next 10 years we will see that these figures change.

This is mostly due to the traditions inside. We have already spoken and analyzed. Although this year I see that there is no such active wave of discussions about celebrating Christmas. In the last two years, or it was artificially created, I remember that the year before last my quotes were launched saying that I was not against it, and I was not really against the transition. But for it to happen correctly. We must act wisely.

— Epiphanius of Kyiv

On 18 October 2022, the Orthodox Church of Ukraine allowed dioceses to hold Christmas services according to the Revised Julian calendar, i.e., 25 December. Where there are pastoral circumstances for this and the desire of the faithful is evidenced, as an exception, by decision of the abbot and the congregation, on 25 December 2022, it may be allowed to hold a divine service with subsequent submission through the diocesan administration to the Kyiv Metropolitanate of written information about the number of participants in divine services. In the case of a divine service, its participants are released from the restrictions of fasting on this day.

On 24 December 2022, during an audience, Major archbishop Sviatoslav handed over to Metropolitan Epiphanius for review a letter outlining the considerations of the UGCC hierarchs regarding the calendar reform. The primates decided to create a joint working group on specific proposals for calendar reform. The joint group is initiated on the occasion of the celebration of the 1700th anniversary of the First Ecumenical Council, held in Nicaea in 325. In this Council, in particular, the calendar principles of church life were determined. On 25 December 2022, Metropolitan Epiphanius announced that at the next meeting of the Synod of the OCU, he would study the experience gained in celebrating Christmas Liturgies on 25 December 2022 in the new style, both positive and negative. And in the future, further steps in the calendar reform of the OCU will be determined exclusively by the council.

On 6 January 2023, Metropolitan Epiphanius announced that the parishes of the Orthodox Church of Ukraine, which want to completely switch to the Revised Julian calendar, will soon be able to do so after the decision of the nearest meeting of the Synod, noting that the OCU has already started on the path of reforming the church calendar and will do everything in order to implement it during 2023.

On 2 February 2023, the Holy Synod of the OCU allowed and approved the procedure for blessing parishes and monasteries for the full use of the Revised Julian calendar, and on 24 May 2023, to hold a meeting of the Council of Bishops, where the issue of calendar reform will be raised.

On 24 May 2023 the Council of Bishops decides to completely switch to the Revised Julian calendar. It was also decided to convene the Local Council of the OCU on 27 July 2023. On 27 July the aforesaid council approved the transition to the Revised Julian calendar. The transition to the New Calendar was applied according to plan on 1 September 2023.

=== Liturgical practices ===
The clergy of the Ukrainian Orthodox Church are involved in the work of the Ukrainian Liturgical Society, which is working to improve Ukrainian-language translations of liturgical texts, and to develop prayer, liturgical, and theological terminology. According to V. Khromets, one of the currently unresolved problems is the inconsistency of the current translations with the original sources (in particular, Greek). The Orthodox liturgical tradition and liturgical literature in Ukraine were also influenced by the long stay under the jurisdiction of the Moscow Patriarchate.

One of the steps towards the return of ancient liturgical traditions was the decision of the Synod of the OCU, according to which it is necessary to pronounce the litany for those announced in the parishes where they are announced – those who are preparing to receive Baptism and undergo catechesis. missing. The traditional following of the epiclesis, ie "the invocation of the grace of the Holy Spirit on the offered Gifts", was restored, according to the practice that existed in the Orthodox Church of Ukraine until the 16th century.

=== 10 theses ===
On the eve of the enthronement of Metropolitan Epiphanius, an initiative group of priests and laity of the OCU published a document with ten proposals for the agenda for the newly established autocephalous church, which would help it better carry out its vocation in today's circumstances. Among them are calls for true catholicity, renewal of parish life, greater involvement of believers in the church, quality translation of liturgical texts, "new evangelization", abandonment of the old paradigm of church-state relations, strengthening transparency and accountability, Church social service, church reform education, dialogue and openness.

== Transition of church communities from Moscow Patriarchate to OCU ==
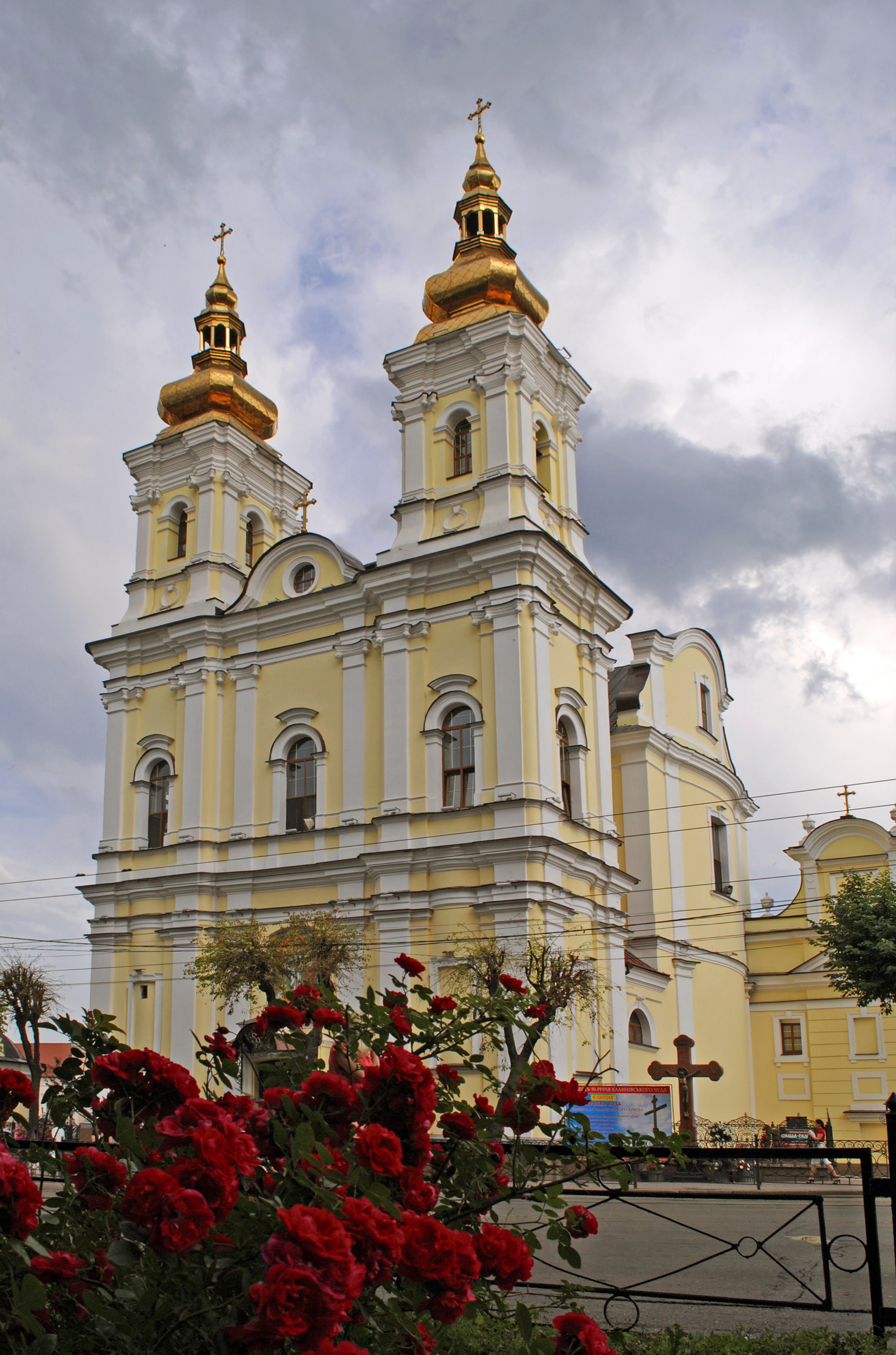
Transfiguration of Christ Cathedral in Vinnytsia, the see of Metropolitan Simeon

Following the formation of the OCU, communities (parishes) of the UOC-MP began to switch over to the jurisdiction of the OCU (list).

On 16 December 2018, the cathedral of Metropolitan Symeon joined the OCU. Simeon was one of the bishops of the UOC-MP who had taken part in the unification council.

On 17 December 2018, the statement of the Synodal Department of the military clergy of the Orthodox Church of Ukraine was quoted by mass media as saying that the Federal Security Service of Russia, along with members of the Moscow Patriarchate, had created mobile groups to prevent communities in Ukraine from switching from the UOC-MP to the OCU, such groups being present in each diocese of the UOC-MP and composed of a lawyer and several brawny men.

On 19 December 2018, the cathedral of Metropolitan Oleksandr (Drabynko), one of the two UOC-MP bishops who had taken part in the unification council, joined the OCU.

On 17 March 2019, TSN reported that more than 500 parishes had switched over to the OCU. Later in March, the primate of the UOC-MP contested the statistics and acknowledged 42 cases of legitimate defections only while attributing scores of others to illicit activity. On 30 March, the UOC-MP acknowledged the transfer of 61 parishes, while the OCU claimed 506 had been transferred.

In April 2022, after the Russian invasion of Ukraine, many UOC-MP parishes signaled their intention to switch allegiance. The attitude and stance of Patriarch Kirill of Moscow to the war is one of the oft-quoted reasons.

From 15 December 2018 to 7 November 2022, 1153 religious communities and monasteries have announced their transition from the UOC of the Moscow Patriarchate to the Orthodox Church of Ukraine. As of January 2023, the church had over 8,000 parishes in total. In August 2024, Ukrainian president Volodymyr Zelenskyy signed into law a bill to ban the UOC-MP.

== See also ==
- Autocephaly to the Orthodox Church of Ukraine
- Unification council of the Orthodox churches of Ukraine
- Conflict between Filaret and Epiphanius
- Volhynian Orthodox Theological Academy
