= Ukrainian Autocephalous Orthodox Church in Diaspora =

Ukrainian Orthodox diocese of the Ecumenical Patriarchate outside of the USA and Canada

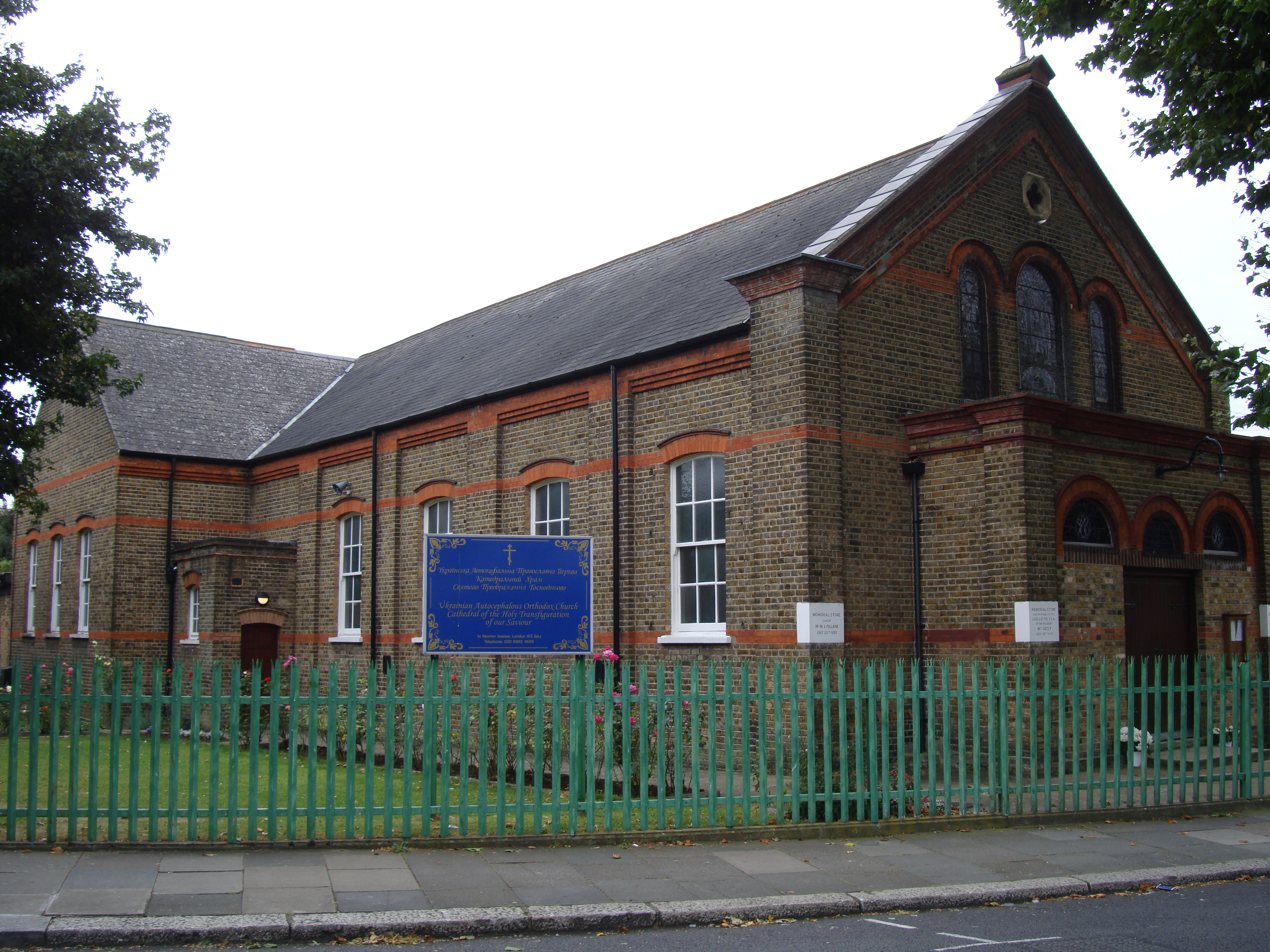
- Ukrainian Autocephalous Orthodox Cathedral in London
- Classification: Christianity
- Orientation: Eastern Orthodoxy
- Scripture: Septuagint, New Testament
- Theology: Eastern Orthodox theology
- Polity: Episcopal
- Prime Hierarch: Metropolitan Anthony (Scharba)
- Eparchies: 3
- Parishes: 24
- Associations: Ecumenical Patriarchate of Constantinople
- Language: Ukrainian, English, Spanish
- Liturgy: Byzantine Rite
- Territory: Outside of Ukraine
- Possessions: United States, South America, Western Europe, Australia
- Origin: 1945; 81 years ago
- Recognition: Autonomy granted and recognised on March 12, 1995 by the Ecumenical Patriarchate of Constantinople
- Separated from: Ukrainian Autocephalous Orthodox Church (in communion with Polish Orthodox Church)
- Separations: Ukrainian Orthodox Church of the USA

The Ukrainian Autocephalous Orthodox Church in Diaspora is an Eastern Orthodox Christian religious organization of Ukrainian diaspora under jurisdiction of the Ecumenical Patriarchate for parishes outside of North America. It consists of three eparchies (dioceses) with their own bishop. The leader of these bishops is Metropolitan Anthony Scharba, concurrently serving as primate of the Ukrainian Orthodox Church of the USA with Archbishop Daniel Zelinsky assisting.

== History ==
Germany was initially the center of the Ukrainian Autocephalous Orthodox Church Abroad due to the vibrant parish life fostered by the influx of immigration from Ukraine. As these immigrants continued on to North America and even Australia and New Zealand, however, the size of the Ukrainian Autocephalous Orthodox Church in Western Europe declined, and by the 1950s most of its hierarchy had relocated to North America, leaving two bishops, Metropolitan Polycarp (Sikorsky) of Lutsk and Archbishop Nicanor (Abramovych) of Chyhyryn, to care for the Ukrainian Orthodox Christians remaining in Western Europe.

The Ukrainian Orthodox in Western Europe were divided between the two bishops, with Archbishop Nicanor supervising the remaining parishes in Germany and Metropolitan Polycarp, who had headed the Ukrainian Autocephalous Orthodox Church in Ukraine during the war years under the oversight of Metropolitan Dionysius (Waledynski) of Warsaw, overseeing its communities in the rest of Western Europe as well as its fledgling parishes in Australia and New Zealand. Metropolitan Dionysius, during the Second World War, was known for collaborating with Nazis against the Soviet Union.

After Metropolitan Polycarp died on 22 October 1953, Metropolitan Nicanor was elected first hierarch of the Ukrainian Autocephalous Orthodox Church, with the North America-based Bishop Mstyslav (Skrypnyk) of Pereyaslav being elected deputy metropolitan in 1956.

On 27 October 1991, Archimandrite John (Derewianka) was consecrated Bishop of London and Great Britain, in 1999 being placed over all the Ukrainian Orthodox parishes in Western Europe and in 2000 being given care of the Ukrainian Orthodox in Australia and New Zealand as well.

In October 2004, the ninth council of the Ukrainian Autocephalous Orthodox Church of the Diaspora nominated Archimandrite Andriy (Peshko) for election as auxiliary bishop for the church in Western Europe. Fr. Andriy was consequently elected Bishop of Krateia by the Holy Synod of the Church of Constantinople and, after his consecration in December 2004, took up oversight of the Ukrainian Orthodox Church in the United Kingdom. Bishop Andriy served in the diocese until his election in 2008 as auxiliary of the Ukrainian Orthodox Eparchy of Central Canada.

Currently, the church and its parishes use both the name Ukrainian Autocephalous Orthodox Church in Diaspora (UAOC in Diaspora) and Ukrainian Orthodox Church in Diaspora (UOC in Diaspora) depending on and varying by parish.

== Structure ==
=== Eparchies (dioceses) ===
The Ukrainian Autocephalous Orthodox Church in Diaspora is divided into three eparchies (dioceses):

- Eparchy of Australia and New Zealand (Australia, New Zealand), headed by Metropolitan Antony (New York City-Washington D.C.)
- Eparchy of Western Europe (Belgium, Germany, France, United Kingdom), headed by Archbishop Daniel (Chicago, Illinois)
- Eparchy of South America (Brazil), headed by Archbishop Jeremiah (Curitiba, Brazil)

In total, there are about 24 parishes (2020). Also, there are 17 more parishes that became part of the Orthodox Church of Ukraine following the 2018 unification assembly. Three more parishes declared that they would stay with Metropolitan Filaret.

=== Ruling episcopes (bishops) ===
Name	Rank	Title	Consecration	
Name	Rank	Title	Date	Lead consecrator
Anthony Scharba	metropolitan	of Hierapolis	October 6, 1985	Mstyslav Skrypnyk
Daniel Zelinsky	archbishop	of Pamphylia	May 10, 2008	Constantine of Irinoupolis
Jeremiah Ferens	archbishop	of Aspendos	September 19, 1993	Constantine of Irinoupolis

=== Former episcopes (bishops) ===
- Polycarp Sikorsky, former Metropolitan of Lutsk and Volhynia (1875–1953), consecrated by Dionysius Waledyński on 10 April 1932
- Nikanor Abramovych, former Archbishop of Kyiv and Chyhyryn (1883–1969), consecrated by Alexander Inozemtsev on 9 February 1942
- Ihor Huba, Archbishop-Paroch of St.Trinity, former vicar Bishop of Bila Tserkva (1885–1966), consecrated by Alexander Inozemtsev on 10 February 1942 (joined Ukrainian Orthodox Church in America (1951–1954), along with Bishop Palladiy Vidybida-Rudenko in UAOC in exile (1954–1961))
- Michael Khoroshy, former Archbishop of Kirovohrad (1885–1977), consecrated by Nikanor Abramovych on 12 May 1942 (left in 1951 for the Ukrainian Orthodox Church of Canada)
- Mstyslav Skrypnyk, Patriarch of Ukraine, Metropolitan of New York and all the USA, former Bishop of Pereyaslav (1898–1993), consecrated by Nikanor Abramovych on 14 May 1942 (in the Ukrainian Greek Orthodox Church of Canada 1947–1949)
- Sylvester Hayevsky, Archibishop of Melbourne and Australia-New Zealand, former Bishop of Lubny (1876–1975), consecrated by Nikanor Abramovych on 16 May 1942
- Hryhoriy Ohiychuk, former Bishop of Zhytomyr (1893–1985), consecrated by Nikanor Abramovych on 17 May 1942 (left in 1947 for the UAOC Assembly-ruled)
- Hennadij Shyprykevych, Archbishop of Chicago and West America, former Archbishop of Sicheslav (1892–1972), consecrated by Polycarp Sikorsky on 24 May 1942 (left in 1962 for the UAOC Assembly-ruled)
- Volodymyr Maletz, Archbishop of Detroit, former bishop of Yelyzavetghrad (1890–1967), consecrated by Nikanor Abramovych on 23 June 1942
- Platon Artemiuk, former Bishop of Rivne (1891–1951), consecrated by Nikanor Abramovych on 2 August 1942
- Vyacheslav Lysytsky, former Bishop of Dubno (1893–1952), consecrated by Polycarp Sikorsky on 13 September 1942 (left in 1951 for the Orthodox Church of America, re-consecrated)
- Serhiy Okhotenko, Archbishop, former Bishop of Melitopol (1890–1971), consecrated by Michael Khoroshy on 1 August 1943 (blessed to join the Belarusian Autocephalous Orthodox Church in 1949)
- Iov Skakalsky, Archbishop of Latin America Eparchy (−1974), consecrated in 1968
- Volodymyr Haj, Archbishop of Latin America Eparchy (−1977), consecrated on 27 October 1974
- Volodymyr Didovycz, Archbishop of Australia and New Zealand (1922–1990), consecrated in 1983
- Paisij Iwaschuk, Bishop of Dafnousia (1913–1998), consecrated on 26 March 1989 (retired in 1992)
- Ioan Derewianka, Archbishop of Parnas (1937– ), consecrated by Mstyslav Skrypnyk on 27 October 1991 (retired in 2016)

=== Primates ===
- 1945–1953 Polikarp (Sikorsky), former Metropolitan of Lutsk and Volhynia
- 1953–1969 Nikanor (Abramovych), former Archbishop of Kyiv and Chyhyryn
- 1969–1993 Mstyslav (Skrypnyk), Metropolitan of New York and all the USA, former Bishop of Pereyaslav
- 1993–2012 Constantine of Irinoupolis, Metropolitan of Irinoupolis
- 2012–present Anthony Scharba, Metropolitan of Hierapolis

== See also ==
- Ukrainian Autocephalous Orthodox Church
- Ukrainian Orthodox Church of Canada
- Ukrainian Orthodox Church of the USA
- History of Christianity in Ukraine
