= Saint Mary the Protectress, Irondequoit =

Church building in New York, United States of America

Saint Mary the Protectress UAO Church
- St. Mary the Protectress located in Irondequoit, New York

Religion
- Affiliation: Ukrainian Orthodox Church of the USA
- District: Eastern Eparchy
- Year consecrated: 1982

Location
- Location: Irondequoit, New York
- Interactive map of Saint Mary the Protectress UAO Church
- Coordinates: 43°12′51.3″N 77°36′30.2″W

Architecture
- Architect: Volodymyr Sichinsky
- Type: Church
- Completed: 1982
- Dome: Five

St. Mary the Protectress, Ukrainian Autocephalous Orthodox Church, (Ukrainian: Церква Покрови Пресвятої Богородиці) located in Irondequoit, New York, is an Orthodox church. The church is located on 3176 St. Paul Boulevard, Irondequoit, New York, USA.

== Early history ==
The parish was founded in 1950 by Ukrainian immigrants that settled in the Rochester, New York area after the post World War II period.

The parish originally purchased a church building in 1954 and was located on Clinton Avenue in the inner Rochester, New York city limits.

== Current location ==
In 1970 the parish committee decided to buy 5-acre (20,000 m^{2}) parcel of land where the church is now located. Initially the parish built a church hall in 1975 and used the proceeds from the rental of the hall to collect funds for the construction of the church. After the then Metropolitan Mstyslav blessed the site of where the church was built in 1978, the majority of the construction was guided by the active parish priest Anatolij Sytnyk (1933–2016).

The church was consecrated October 17, 1982 by Archbishop Mark (Hundiak).

The current pastor is Ihor Krekhovetsky.

== Facilities ==
On the church grounds is a rectory where the current pastor lives. The rectory was built in 1976 and consecrated in 1977.

The church hall is a facility which has held many of the parish events including liturgies until the church was built. It was completed in 1976 but was destroyed by fire in the 1990s and was rebuilt.

By the church there are some dedicated monuments in memory of the Holodomor of 1932–33 and the Chernobyl disaster of 1986.

Behind the church hall is a soccer field used by the Ukrainian American Sports Club.

== Gallery ==
Church interior - Iconstasis

Stained glass windows

Rectory

Consecration plaque

Chernobyl memorial

Memorial area

Hall and parking area

Interior of the hall

Sports field
