= Daniel Zelinsky (bishop) =

American Ukrainian Orthodox bishop (born 1972)

His Eminence Daniel
- Archbishop of Pamphilon
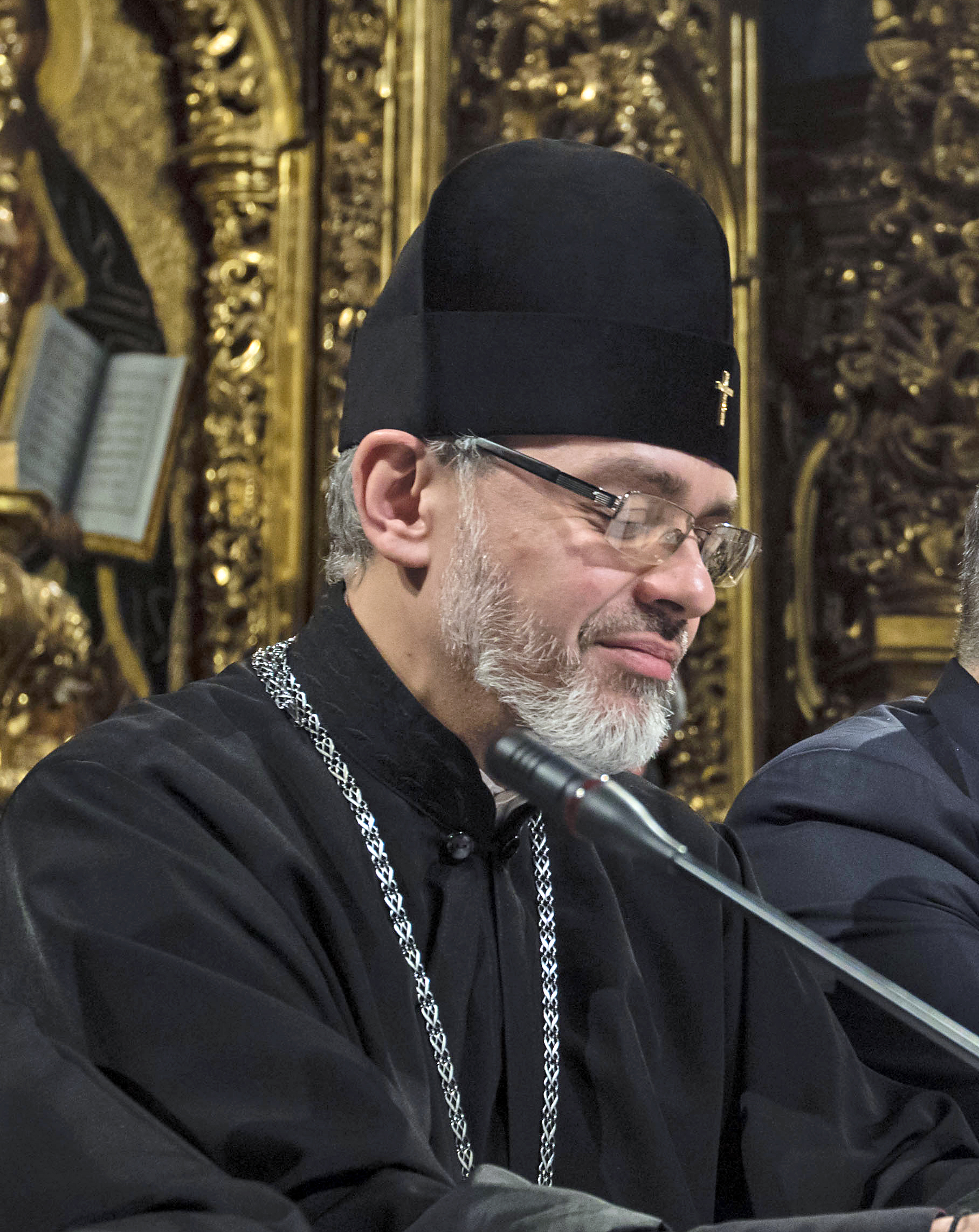
- Daniel at the Unification council of the Eastern Orthodox churches of Ukraine
- Church: Ukrainian Orthodox Church of the USA

Orders
- Ordination: 12 May 2001 by Anthony (Schraba)
- Consecration: 10 May 2008 by Constantine (Buggan)

Personal details
- Born: Volodymyr Olegovych Zelinsky; September 28, 1972 (age 53) Ivano-Frankivsk, Ukrainian SSR, Soviet Union (now Ukraine)
- Denomination: Eastern Orthodox

Archbishop Daniel (secular name Volodymyr Olegovych Zelinsky, (Note: Ukrainian: Володимир Олегович Зелінський, romanized: Volodymyr Olehovych Zelinskyi) born September 28, 1972) is an American Ukrainian Orthodox hierarch who is the Archbishop of Pamphylia and of the Western Eparchy of the Ukrainian Orthodox Church of the USA (UOC of USA) since 2008. Metropolitan Antony (Scharba) has also appointed him since 2016 as head of the Western European eparchy of the Ukrainian Autocephalous Orthodox Church in Diaspora.

== Early life and education ==
Zelinsky was born on September 28, 1972, in Ivano-Frankivsk, Ukraine to a family of teachers and grew up in Buchach. After graduating from high school, in September 1993 he entered the first year of the Ivano-Frankivsk Uniate Seminary. In 1996, he emigrated to the United States, where he attended the Catholic University of America and later the Dominican House of Studies, both located in Washington, D.C. At this point in time, he was ordained a deacon.

== Ordination ==
On May 12, 2001, Zelinsky was ordained a priest by Archbishop Anthony at the St. Andrew Memorial Church in South Bound Brook, New Jersey. There, on June 1, Zelinsky was appointed head of the Consistory Public Relations Department and registrar. On May 22, 2002, he was ordained a monk by Anthony under the name Daniel, which took place at the Ukrainian monastery of St. Elijah in Dover, Florida. On October 3, 2007, Daniel was elevated to archimandrite. Later that month, he was elected for elevation to bishop.

== Episcopacy ==
On May 9, 2008, Daniel was ordained as a bishop. The following day, he was also consecrated Bishop of Pamphilon. In October 2008, he was elected head of the Western Eparchy.

On September 7, 2018, as part of the Autocephaly of the Orthodox Church of Ukraine, Daniel was appointed Exarch of the Ecumenical Patriarch in Ukraine.
