= Nikanor Abramovych =

Nikanor (Abramowicz)
- Primate of Ukrainian Autocephalous Orthodox Church (in diaspora)
- Church: Ukrainian Autocephalous Orthodox Church
- Installed: 1953
- Term ended: 1969
- Predecessor: Polikarp (Sikorsky) (Ukrainian Autocephalous Orthodox Church)
- Successor: Mstyslav (Skrypnyk)

Orders
- Ordination: 7 February 1942
- Consecration: 9 February 1942 by Archbishop Aleksandr (Inozemtsev), Archbishop Polikarp (Sikorsky), Bishop George (Korenistow)

Personal details
- Born: Nikanor Nikandrovych Burczak-Abramowicz; August 8, 1883 near Stara Vyzhivka, Volhynian Governorate, Russian Empire
- Died: March 21, 1969 (aged 85) Karlsruhe, Germany

Metropolitan Nikanor (secular name Nikanor Nikandrovych Burczak-Abramowicz, Ukrainian: Нiканор Нiкандрович Бурчак-Абрамович; July 2, 1875 - October 22, 1953) was a bishop of the Ukrainian Autocephalous Orthodox Church.

He was born in 1883 in village near Stara Vyzhivka in Volhynian Polesie in a family of impoverished church teacher Nikandor Fedorovych Burczak-Abramowicz and his wife Olena Mykolaivna (née Pynkevych). His old noble family hailed from the Grand Duchy of Lithuania (Lytvyns) who moved to Volhynia, Kyiv and Chelm lands and were Ukrainized (Ruthenized). His ancestors belonged to clergy (so called the First Estate).

At first Nikanor studied in native village church-parochial school where his father worked as a teacher, later in Miletska Theological school near Kovel in Matsiyove (today does not exist). Upon graduation from Miletska Theological school, he enrolled to the Volhynian Theological Academy in Zhytomyr. Nikanor lost his dad when he was 15, while his mother died in 1918 soon after she received information that Bolsheviks in Bessarabia murdered her son Fedir, a student of Kharkiv Veterinary Institute. During the 1905 Revolution Nikanor was involved in local Ukrainian "Hromada" of Zhytomyr that was formed by Luka Haskevych and became a leader of it after the Russian Gendarmes killed Haskevych in 1905.

Due to family circumstances upon graduation from Volhynian Theological Academy, Nikanor had to find a job and for several years works as a teacher of church-parochial schools near Volodymyr and enrolls to the Kyiv Commercial Institute where he studied for three years. In 1910 Nikanor was married. The same year on 4 November 1910 vicar Bishop of Vladimir-Volynsky Fadei (Volhynian Eparchy, Russian Orthodox Church) by order of the ruling Archbishop Antony (Khrapovitsky) ordained Nikanor in St Volodymyr's Cathedral as a deacon and the next day 5 November 1910 – a priest.

In 1918 Nikanor finished the Kyiv Theological Academy but did not receive his title of candidate of theology due to occupation of Kyiv by Bolsheviks and his forced emigration to western parts of Ukraine which was occupied by Poles. While studying in Kyiv Theological Academy, in 1917 Nikanor also enrolled the Kyiv University Philology and History Faculty where he for two years studied history.

In 1912–1916 Nikanor worked as a priest in village of Tyshkovychi and was forced to move to Zhytomyr as frontlines of World War I moved east. In 1918 he joined the Ukrainian Fraternity of Our Saviour in Zhytomyr and Volhynian Prosvita (Enlightenment society), was appointed a gubernatorial instructor of National Education in Volhynia. In 1919 after sudden occupation of Zhytomyr by Bolsheviks Nikanor was arrested and miraculously managed escape own execution by fleeing to Polish occupied territories of Ukraine near the city of Volodymyr.

In 1924 Metropolitan Dionizy (Waledyński) awarded Nikanor with title of Protoiereus (archpriest). In 1927 Nikanor was investigated by church and government officials and temporary was stripped of Polish citizenship. In 1928 he divorced his wife. Also in 1928 for his Ukrainization efforts Nikanor was imprisoned in Derman Monastery for three years. After Nikanor was freed, he was appointed to organize Orthodox parish in Kivertsi near Lutsk and came in conflict with local voivode Henryk Józewski for building a church in Kivertsi.

In 1932 Nikanor joined the Society of Metropolitan Petro Mohyla in Lutsk. He stayed in Kivertsi until 1934 and then was appointed a priest to village Mizove parish where he remained until 1942. On 7 February 1942 Nikanor made tonsure to monasticism and was elevated to the rank of archimandrite the next day. On 9 February 1942 he was consecrated as Bishop of Chyhyryn, vicar of Provisional Administrator in the Crucifix Archiereus Church in Pinsk.

On 13 March 1942 bishops Nikanor and Ihor arrived to Kyiv and in April 1942 Bishop Ihor moved to his eparchy (diocese). On 11 May 1942 took place the Second Archiereus (Bishop) Assembly during which Nikanor became Archbishop of Kyiv and Chyhyryn. Along with Archbishop Ihor (Huba), Nikanor consecrated four episcopes (bishops) in following few days: Archimandrite Michael (Khoroshy), Archimandrite Mstyslav (Skrypnyk), Archimandrite Sylvester Hayevsky and Hryhoriy (Ohiychuk). These consecrations were officially approved by letters from metropolitans Polikarp and Aleksandr. By that time Archbishop Nikanor consecrated in total six bishops. On 24 July 1942 Reichskommissar of Ukraine Erich Koch has officially requested Metropolitan Polikarp to remove Archbishop Nikanor and Bishop Mstyslav from office.
