= Ukrainian Autocephalous Orthodox Church =

Christian denomination (1989–2018)

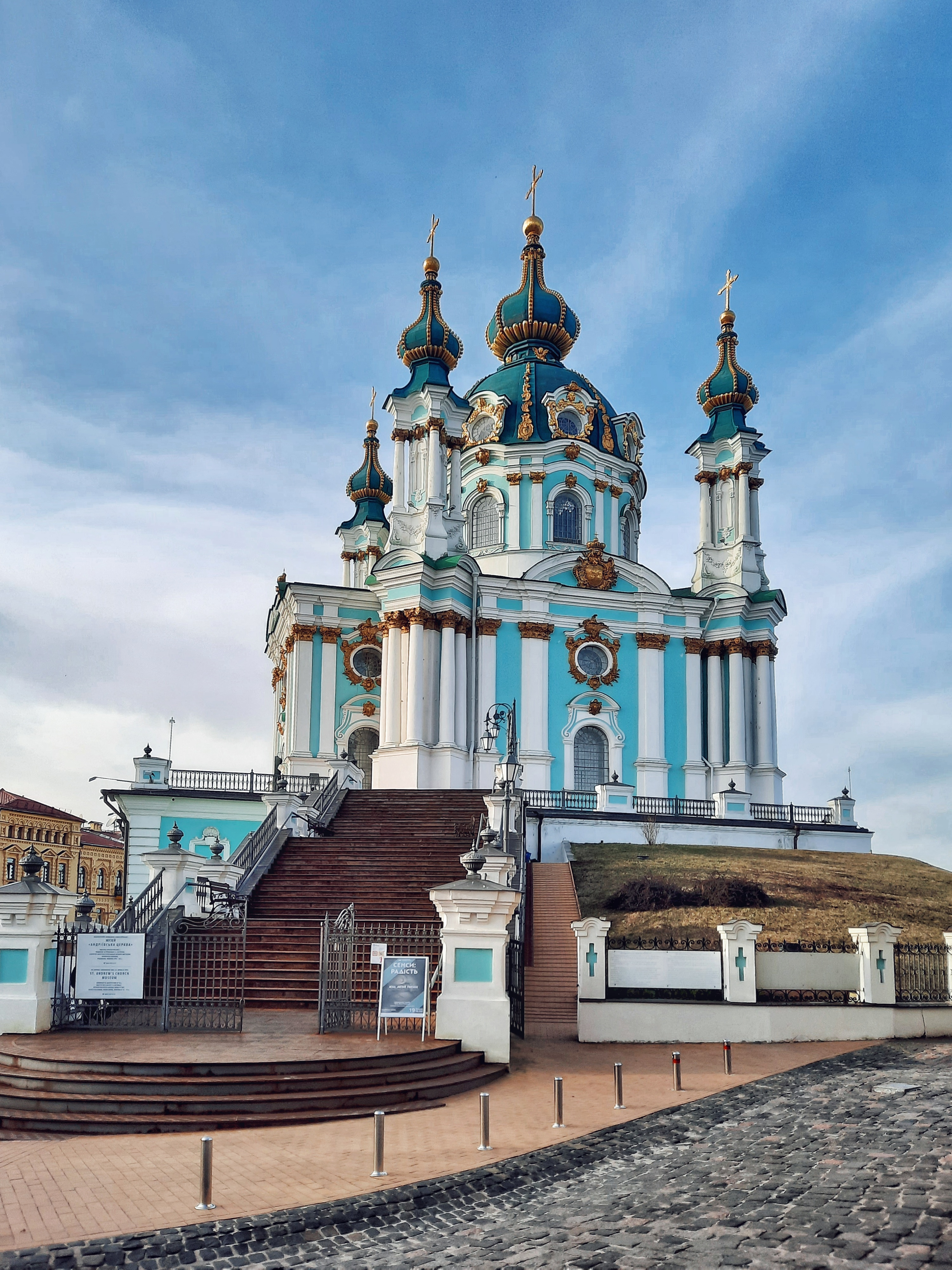
- The Church of St. Andrew in Kyiv was the main cathedral of the UAOC
- Abbreviation: UAOC
- Primate: Metropolitan Macarius (last primate)
- Language: Ukrainian; Church Slavonic
- Headquarters: Kyiv, Ukraine
- Territory: Ukraine
- Possessions: Western Europe; United States
- Founder: 1st All-Ukrainian Orthodox Church Assembly
- Origin: 1921 (first), 1942 (second), 1989 (third)
- Recognition: Full communion with the Ecumenical Patriarchate of Constantinople restored in October 2018 Polish Orthodox Church (1942–1946)
- Separations: UAOC in diaspora; UAOC in exile
- Merged into: Orthodox Church of Ukraine
- Defunct: 1936 (first), 1944 (second), 15 December 2018 (third)
- Members: 3 million

The Ukrainian Autocephalous Orthodox Church (UAOC; Ukrainian: Українська автокефальна православна церква (УАПЦ), romanized: Ukrayinska avtokefalna pravoslavna tserkva (UAPTs)) was one of the three major Eastern Orthodox churches in Ukraine in the late 20th and early 21st centuries, together with the Ukrainian Orthodox Church – Kyiv Patriarchate (UOC-KP) and the Ukrainian Orthodox Church – Moscow Patriarchate (UOC-MP). It began in 1921 during the dissolution of the Russian Empire as part of the Ukrainian independence movement and in order to restore the Ukrainian Orthodox Church that existed in the Polish–Lithuanian Commonwealth in 1620–1685 and was annexed by the Moscow Patriarchate without approval of the Ecumenical Patriarchate of Constantinople. The UAOC came to an end in December 2018 as it united with the UOC-KP into the newly formed Orthodox Church of Ukraine (OCU).

The UAOC, in its contemporary form, has its origins in the synod of 1921 in Kyiv, shortly after Ukraine's newly found independence. It was re-established for the third time on 22 October 1989, right before the fall of the Soviet Union. Unlike the UOC-KP, the UAOC enjoyed no recognition by the rest of the Orthodox Christian community until 11 October 2018, when the Ecumenical Patriarchate of Constantinople lifted the excommunication which had afflicted both the UAOC and the UOC-KP. It was clarified on 2 November 2018, however, that the Ecumenical Patriarchate recognized neither the UAOC nor the UOC-KP as legitimate and that their respective leaders were not recognized as primates of their churches. On 15 December 2018, at the unification council of the Eastern Orthodox churches of Ukraine, the UAOC and the UOC-KP, along with metropolitans from the UOC-MP, unified into the OCU.

== History ==
=== Background ===
The Kyivan Metropolis was the fruit of the baptism of the Kyivan Rus in the time of Grand Prince Vladimir the Great (988 AD). Missionaries were sent from Constantinople to instruct the people in the Byzantine-Orthodox faith. Monastic life flourished, including in the famous Kyiv Monastery of the Caves, through the efforts of St. Anthony of Kiev, known as the father of Russian monasticism.

The sacking of Kyiv itself in December 1240 during the Mongol invasion led to the ultimate collapse of the Rus' state. For many of its residents, the brutality of Mongol attacks sealed the fate of many choosing to find safe haven in the North East. In 1299, the Kyivan metropolitan chair was moved to Vladimir by Metropolitan Maximus, keeping the title of Kyiv. As Vladimir-Suzdal, and later the Grand Duchy of Moscow continued to grow unhindered, the Orthodox religious link between them and Kyiv remained strong. The fall of Constantinople in 1453, allowed the once daughter church of North East, to become autocephalous, with Kyiv remaining part of the Ecumenical Patriarchate. From that moment on, the churches of Ukraine and Russia went their own separate ways.

The latter became central in the growing Russian Tsardom, attaining patriarchate in 1589, whilst the former became subject to repression and Polonization efforts, particularly after the Union of Brest in 1596. Eventually the persecution of Orthodox Ukrainians led to a massive rebellion under Bohdan Khmelnytsky, and united the Ukrainian Hetmanate with the Russian Tsardom. In 1686, the Kyivan Metropolia came under the Moscow Patriarchate. Ukrainian clergy, due to their Greek training, held key roles in the Russian Orthodox Church until the end of the 18th century.

=== First establishment ===
In the wake of the breakup of the Russian Empire some national groups sought autonomy or autocephaly from Moscow. Proclamation of the Ukrainian National Republic in 1917 was followed by the creation of the All-Ukrainian Orthodox Church Council, which represented clergy and laity from around Ukraine. This event signified the beginning of Ukrainization in church life and contributed to the establishment of the organizational structure of the Ukrainian church. A decree on autocephaly was adopted by the government of the Ukrainian Republic, but it was never implemented due to the events of Ukrainian-Soviet War.

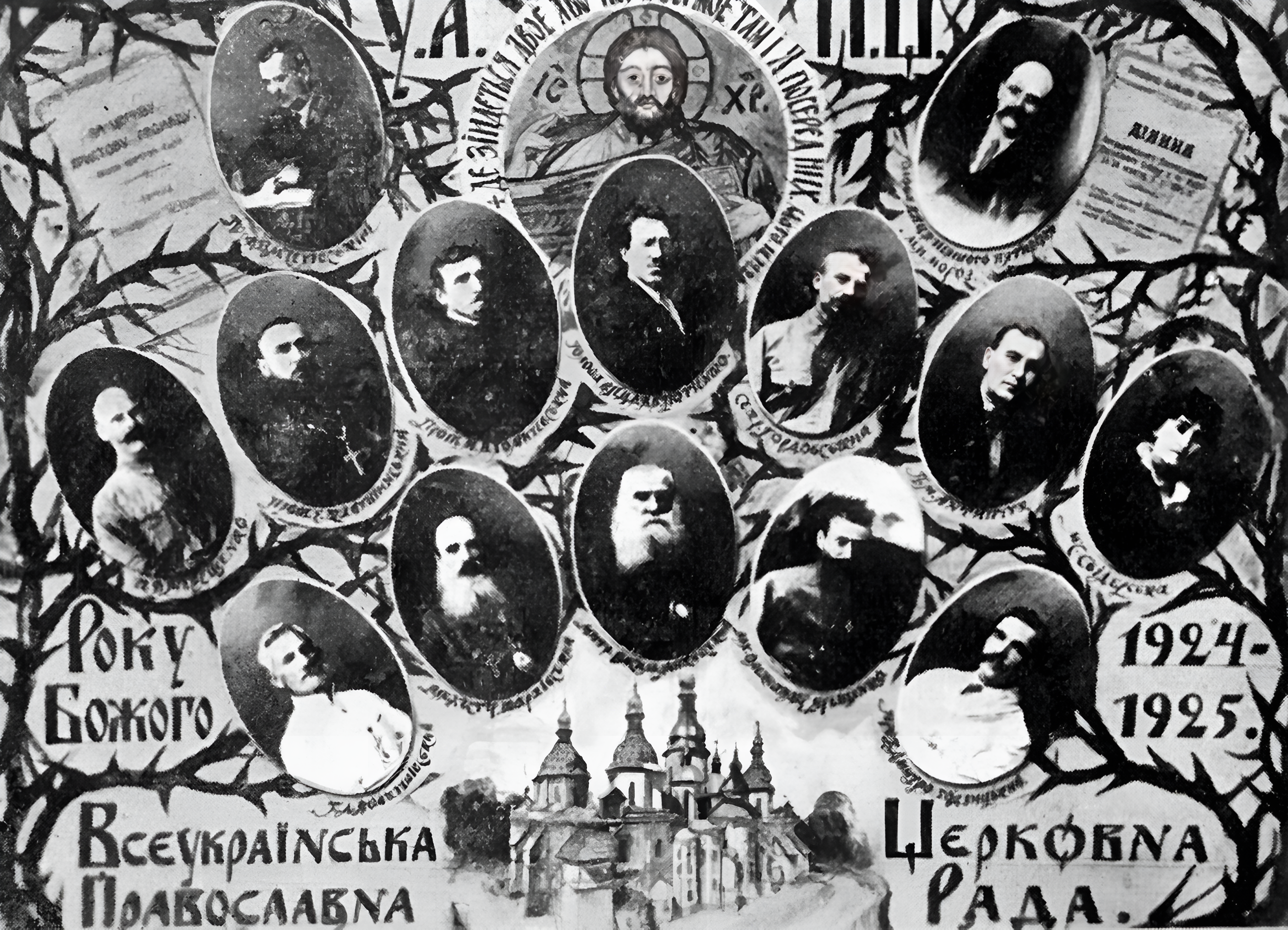
Participants of the All-Ukrainian Orthodox Church Congress in 1924-1925

In May 1920 the Ukrainian church was finally proclaimed autocephalous at a sobor in Kyiv. Its first bishops were initially ordained by non-episcopal clergy and professors, similar to the early Alexandrian Church. During the 1920s, under the leadership of metropolitan Vasyl Lypkivsky and his deputy Nestor Sharaievsky, the Ukrainian Autocephalous Orthodox Church experienced a period of rapid growth and spread its influence on Ukrainian communities abroad. Among main tenets of the church during that time were dedication to the separation of church and state, as well as conciliarism, which included democratization and decentralization of church life. The church was also known for allowing vernacular Ukrainian to be used in religious service instead of Church Slavonic.

The canonical reforms introduced by the UAOC created difficulties in relations with other Orthodox churches. The Russian Orthodox Church declared it noncanonical and its leaders self-consecrated. The Patriarchate of Moscow was especially concerned with the transfer of Kyiv's Saint Sophia Cathedral to the Ukrainian church. Soviet authorities, in their turn, also worked to weaken UAOC's influence by supporting splinter groups and favouring competing churches, most prominently the Living Church. In 1926 a major crackdown by the GPU led to the arrest and imprisonment of metropolitan Vasyl Lypkivsky, which led to his replacement by Mykola Boretsky. In 1929 UAOC's leadership was accused of supporting the Union for the Liberation of Ukraine, and many of its leaders, such as Volodymyr Chekhivskyi, were arrested. In January 1930 an exraordinary synod proclaimed the formal abolition of the church, however it was soon reconstituted by around 300 parishes headed by Ivan Pavlovsky. This remaining Ukrainian Orthodox Church was destroyed in 1936, and by the end of the decade the entire hierarchy of UAOC, as well as many of its priests and faithful, were physically liquidated.

=== 1942 reestablishment ===
On 8–10 February 1942, the Ukrainian Autocephalous Orthodox Church was re-established by metropolitans Alexander (Inozemtsev) and Polycarp (Sikorsky), with the approval of the primate of the Polish Orthodox Church, Metropolitan Dionysius (Waledyński). Considered a diocese of Polish Orthodoxy, the 1942 UAOC's leadership considered themselves successors to the autocephalous Polish Orthodox Church, which was granted autocephaly by the Ecumenical Patriarchate of Constantinople.

The re-established UAOC was opposed by another religious group, the Ukrainian Autonomous Orthodox Church headed by metropolitan Alexy Hromadsky, which rejected the acceptance of clergy consecrated during the 1920s as uncanonical and took a position of loyalty to the Patriarch of Moscow, as long as he wouldn't stand under Soviet domination. With the recapture of Ukraine by Soviet troops in 1944, all the bishops of UAOC fled to the West, and its parishes were liquidated or forcibly reattached to the Russian Orthodox Church.

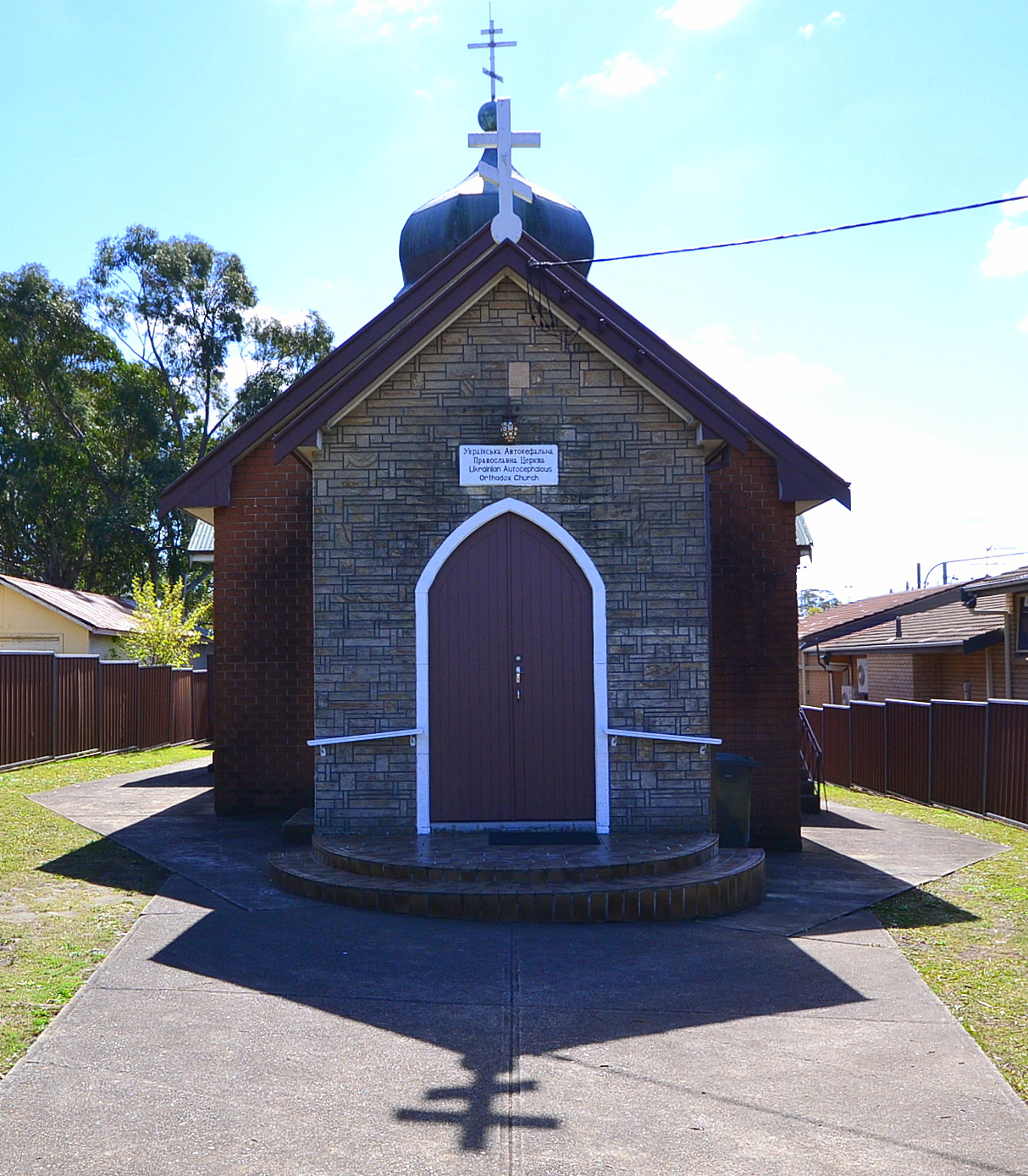
Ukrainian Autocephalous Orthodox Church in Sydney

In the following decades UAOC was active in Ukrainian emigré circles in Europe. However, its positions in the diaspora gradually weakened with the emigration of many Ukrainians to North America, where they joined the already existing Canadian and American churches. A splinter group known as the UAOC (Conciliar) emerged in 1947, which rejected the decisions of the Synod of Bishops in favour of return to practices of sobor rule. At the same time, new parishes of UAOC were established in Great Britain, Australia, New Zealand and South America.

=== Reestablishment in late 1980s ===
The revival of the Ukrainian Autocephalous Orthodox Church in Ukraine took place in late 1988. On 15 February 1989, the Initiative Committee for Revival of the UOAC was established in Kyiv on the basis of the Ukrainian Culturological Club. It consisted of priest Bohdan Mykhailechko (Yelgava), priest Myron Sas-Zhurakivskyi (Kolomyia), Larysa Lokhvytska, Antoliy Bytchenko, Mykola Budnyk, Serhii Naboka and Yevhen Sverstiuk. An appeal was approved, which called for the formation of regional committees for the revival of the UAOC and to begin commemorating the Ecumenical Patriarch Demetrios I at divine services. The Initiative Committee headed by Bohdan Mykhailechko published an appeal to the Supreme Soviet of the Soviet Union and Supreme Soviet of the Ukrainian Soviet Socialist Republic (predecessor of Verkhovna Rada) and the international Christian community. Recalling the long-term captivity and lack of rights of the Ukrainian Church under the rule of Moscow, the five founders of the committee expressed and substantiated the demand for the restoration of full autocephaly.

On Easter 1989, the Kyiv-based Ukrainian Orthodox community held a festive service in a private home. This was the first Ukrainian-language worship service in the capital of Ukraine since 1943. But in early June, the Kyiv city authorities refused to register the UAOC parish of Saint Nicholas of the Embankment in Podil, saying "there has never been and is no such Church as the UAOC, and therefore a non-existent Church cannot be registered." This is a translation of the verbatim repetition of the thesis expressed by the Exarch of Ukraine, Metropolitan Philaret (Denysenko).

On February 27, 1989, a group of Lviv priests of the Russian Orthodox Church appealed to Metropolitan Philaret (Denysenko) with a statement about the need to obtain autocephaly for the Ukrainian Exarchate. Archpriest Volodymyr Yarema, parson of the Peter and Paul Parish in Lviv, signed the statement on behalf of like-minded people. No response was received. The reaction to the letter was the consideration of the case of Volodymyr Yarema in the diocesan administration. However, strict sanctions against the authors of the letter were not applied due to the difficult situation in the diocese, where it became obvious that the Ukrainian Greek Catholic Church would soon come out of the underground.

The Russian Orthodox Church Lviv Metropolitan Nicodemus (Rusnak) (1921-2011), previously expelled from Argentina for espionage for the Soviet Union, was ready to support efforts to obtain autocephaly on the condition that local Greek Catholics, who had begun to emerge from the underground, join the newly forming Ukrainian Autocephalous Orthodox Church. He sent Archpriest Volodymyr Yarema and priest Ivan Pashula for negotiations with Volodymyr Sterniuk, head of the Ukrainian Greek Catholic Church in catacombs. However, Bishop Sterniuk refused to join the Church (UAOC), which will not recognize the jurisdiction of the Roman bishop.

On 19 August 1989, at the Holy Liturgy in the Peter and Paul Cathedral in Lviv, which was first held in Ukrainian, Archpriest Volodymyr Yarema read the appeal of the Initiative Committee for the revival of the UAOC, which proposed:

1. To create regional committees for the revival of the UAOC for their subsequent merger into the All-Ukrainian Orthodox Council.
2. In your parishes, gather parish meetings, by the decision of which declare your refusal to obey the Russian Orthodox Church.
3. Inform the regional committees about your unshakable loyalty to your native UAPC.
4. Commemorate His Holiness Ecumenical Patriarch Demetrios I at all divine services.

Priest Bohdan Mykhailechko, head of the Initiative Committee, took part in the service and addressed the faithful with a statement of support for the initiative of the church of St. apostles Peter and Paul in Lviv. He emphasized: "Moscow did not have and cannot have any jurisdiction over our Church." Telegrams were sent to Ecumenical Patriarch Demetrios I; Metropolitan of the Ukrainian Orthodox Church of the USA Mstyslav (Skrypnyk); and Metropolitan of the Ukrainian Orthodox Church of Canada Wasyly (Fedak) with a message about the change of jurisdiction. The collection of signatures for the application in the name of the Commissioner for Religious Confessions at the Lviv Regional Executive Committee, Yuliyan Reshetyl, was completed.

On October 22, 1989, the freelance bishop of the Russian Orthodox Church, Ioan Bodnarchuk, arrived in Lviv at the invitation of the clergy to lead the communities that had transferred to the UAOC. He conducted the Divine Service, after which he ordained a deacon, a graduate of the Lviv Polygraphic Institute, Yuri Boyko, who was elected to the first democratic city council of Lviv. Thus, he entered the canonical management of the UAOC communities. Priests of the Lviv Region, led by Bishop Ioan, held the first diocesan council.

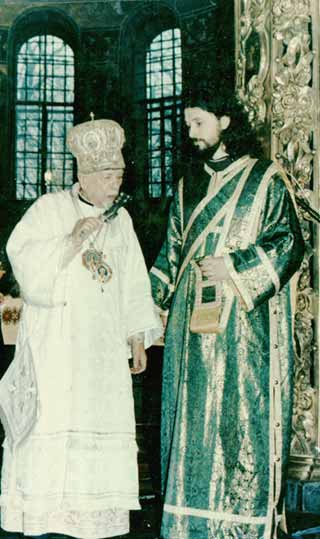
Patriarch Mstyslav performing a religious service in Kyiv's St. Andrew's Church, 1991

The church regained state recognition in 1991, which is known as the "third resurrection" of the UAOC. Initially it was governed from abroad by Patriarch Mstyslav (Skrypnyk). Subsequent to his death in 1993, he was succeeded by Patriarch Volodomyr. The patriarch would, during his time as patriarch, separate from the UAOC to found the Ukrainian Orthodox Church – Kyiv Patriarchate (UOC-KP), together with Metropolitan (now Patriarch) Filaret Denysenko. Those not willing to accept this change continued the UAOC with a new primate, Patriarch Dymytriy Yarema.

In November of 1991, the Ukrainian Autocephalous Ukrainian Church had 14 eparchies, 11 bishops (episcopes) and 1,600 parishes.

On October 16, 2000, the UAOC Church Sobor in Ukraine elected Metropolitan Methodius (Kudriakov) of Ternopil to lead the church.

The Patriarchal Cathedral of the UAOC is the historic Church of St. Andrew the First-Called in Kyiv. It was built between 1747 and 1754 and was designed by the famous architect Bartolomeo Rastrelli. Although used for regular liturgical services of the Ukrainian Autocephalous Orthodox Church, the edifice had previously been a part of the historical park "Sofia-Kyiv." The Ukrainian government returned the church to the legal possession of the UAOC on 21 May 2008.

=== 11 October 2018 decision of the Ecumenical Patriarchate ===
On 11 October 2018, after a regular synod, the Ecumenical Patriarchate of Constantinople renewed an earlier decision to move towards granting autocephaly to the Ukrainian Orthodox Church. The synod also withdrew Constantinople's 332-years-old qualified acceptance of the Russian Orthodox Church's canonical jurisdiction over the Ukrainian Church contained in a letter of 1686. The synod also lifted the excommunication of Patriarch Filaret of the Ukrainian Orthodox Church – Kyiv Patriarchate (UOC-KP) and Metropolitan Makariy of the Ukrainian Autocephalous Orthodox Church (UAOC), and both bishops were "canonically reinstated to their hierarchical or priestly rank, and their faithful [...] restored to communion with the Church."

It was later clarified that Filaret was considered by the Ecumenical Patriarchate only as "the former metropolitan of Kyiv", and Makariy as "the former Archbishop of Lviv" and, on 2 November 2018, that the Ecumenical Patriarchate did not recognize neither the UAOC nor the UOC-KP as legitimate and that their respective leaders were not recognized as primates of their churches. The Ecumenical Patriarchate, however, declared that it recognized the sacraments performed by the UOC-KP and the UAOC as valid.

==== Dissolution and merger into the Orthodox Church of Ukraine ====
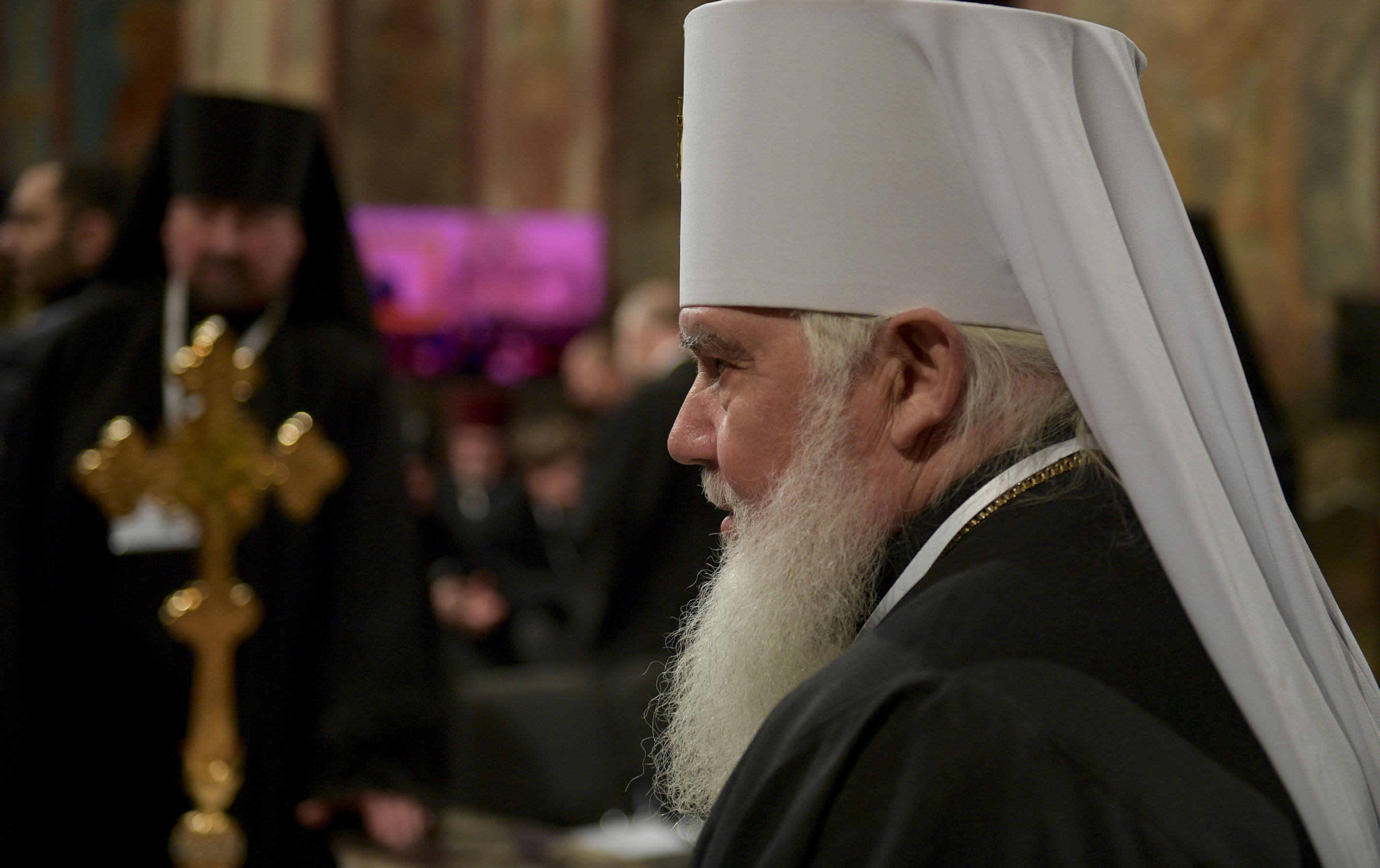
Macarius, head of UAOC, attending the Unification council of the Orthodox Churches in Ukraine in 2018

On 15 December 2018, the hierarchs of the UAOC and the UOC-KP decided to dissolve them both. This was done because on the same day, the Ukrainian Autocephalous Orthodox Church, the Ukrainian Orthodox Church – Kyiv Patriarchate, and some members of the Ukrainian Orthodox Church (Moscow Patriarchate) were going to merge to form the Orthodox Church of Ukraine after a unification council.

Bishop Macarius declared in an interview published on 23 May 2019 that neither the UAOC nor the UOC-KP had been dissolved: "Some government officials spoke incorrectly when they publicly declared that the Kyiv Patriarchate was liquidated." He explained that Philaret submitted only copies of documents, not the originals necessary in order to liquidate the UOC-KP. Macarius added: "When I was asked to hand over the documents for liquidation, I replied that until I see the originals from the other side, I will not turn in mine."

On 14 August 2019, the UAOC legally ceased to exist because it merged with the OCU.

On 14 December 2019, after the meeting of the enlarged Bishops' Council, held on December 14 in Kyiv on the occasion of the anniversary of the creation of the OCU, Epiphanius of Kyiv declared that the procedure of liquidation of the UAOC as well as the UOC-KP had been completed the day before. He added: "Such structures no longer exist. In confirmation of that, in the State Register there is marked 'activity DISCONTINUED'".

== Primates ==
=== 1921–1936 ===
In 1921, with the establishment of the Ukrainian Autocephalous Orthodox Church, the Metropolitan of Kyiv and All Ukraine was considered the primate of the church. This system continued until 1936 when, due to Soviet pressure, the Ukrainian Autocephalous Orthodox Church was forced into emigration, with some of its members emigrating to the United States. The primates from 1921 to 1936 were:

- Vasyl Lypkivsky, Metropolitan of Kyiv and All Ukraine (1921–1927)
- Mykola Boretsky, Metropolitan of Kyiv and All Ukraine (1927–1930)
- Ivan Pavlovsky, Metropolitan of Kyiv and All Ukraine (1930–1936)

=== 1942–1944 ===
In 1942, UAOC was re-established with help of the Polish Orthodox Church during occupation of Ukraine by Nazi Germany. This period lasted till the return of the Red Army in 1944, after that the UAOC was forced to emigration for a second time due to persecutions by the Soviet regime and remained structured only in the Ukrainian diaspora.

- Polikarp (Sikorsky), Archbishop of Lutsk and Volhynia, temporary administrator (1941–1944)
- Dionizy (Waledyński), Metropolitan of Warsaw and all Poland (1923–1960), proclaimed (not enthroned) Patriarch of all Ukraine (1944–1960)

=== In diaspora (Europe), 1945–1990 ===
- Polikarp (Sikorsky), former Metropolitan of Lutsk and Volhynia, Primate of UAOC in diaspora (1945–1953)
- Nikanor (Abramovych), former Archbishop of Kyiv and Chyhyryn, Primate of UAOC in diaspora (1953–1969)
- Mstyslav (Skrypnyk), Metropolitan of New York and all the USA, former Bishop of Pereyaslav, Primate of UAOC in diaspora (1969–1993)

=== 1990–2018 ===
In 1990 the Ukrainian Autocephalous Orthodox Church was reinstated in Ukraine, and the Ukrainian Orthodox Church of Canada and the Ukrainian Autocephalous Orthodox Church in diaspora Metropolitan Mstyslav was enthroned as a patriarch. Since 2000, the church primate has been the Metropolitan of Kyiv and All Ukraine.

- Metropolitan Ioan (Vasyl Bodnarchuk), Metropolitan of Lviv and Galicia, former Bishop of Zhytomyr and Ovruch, Primate of UAOC (1989–1991)
- Patriarch Mstyslav (Stepan Skrypnyk), Patriarch of Kyiv and all Rus-Ukraine (1991–1993)
- Patriarch Dymytriy (Volodymyr Yarema), Patriarch of Kyiv and all Rus-Ukraine (1993–2000)
- Metropolitan Mefodiy (Valeriy Kudriakov), Metropolitan of Kyiv and All Ukraine (2000–2015)
- Metropolitan Makariy (Mykola Maletych), Metropolitan of Kyiv and All Ukraine (2015–2018)

Metropolitan Epiphanius of Kyiv and All Ukraine was elected primate of the Orthodox Church of Ukraine on 15 December 2018.

== Local councils ==
- 5-6 June 1990 (Kyiv) – 7 bishops, over 200 priests, around 700 delegates.
  - Confirmed revival of the Ukrainian Autocephalous Orthodox Church
  - Election of Metropolitan Mstyslav a Patriarch of Kyiv and All Ukraine (in absentia, due to the Soviet authorities)
  - Adopted a statute
- 25-26 June 1992 (Kyiv) – 10 bishops
  - Unification with the Ukrainian Orthodox Church
  - Formation of the united church, Ukrainian Orthodox Church – Kyiv Patriarchate
  - Confirmed election of Patriach Mstyslav of Kyiv as the primate of the church
- 7 September 1993 (Kyiv)
  - Revival of the Ukrainian Autocephalous Orthodox Church
  - Election of new primate
- 14-15 September 2000 (Kyiv)
  - Election of new primate

== Enthronizations ==
- 18 November 1990 Patriarch Mstyslav of Kyiv in the St. Sophia Monastery
- 14 September 1993 Patriarch Demetrius of Kyiv in the Church of the Saviour at Berestove

== See also ==
- 2018 Moscow–Constantinople schism
- Unification council of the Orthodox churches of Ukraine
- Autocephaly of the Orthodox Church of Ukraine
- Consecration in Eastern Christianity
- List of bishops of the Ukrainian Autocephalous Orthodox Church
