= Ukrainian Orthodox Church of the USA =

Ukrainian Orthodox diocese of the Ecumenical Patriarchate in the USA

Coordinates: 40°32′35″N 74°31′11″W

Ukrainian Orthodox Church of the USA Українська православна церква США (Ukrainian)
- UOC of USA logo
- Classification: Christianity
- Orientation: Eastern Orthodoxy
- Scripture: Septuagint, New Testament
- Theology: Eastern Orthodox theology
- Polity: Episcopal
- Prime Hierarch: Anthony Scharba
- President of the Consistory: Daniel Zelinsky
- Associations: National Council of Churches
- Language: Ukrainian; English
- Liturgy: Byzantine Rite
- Headquarters: South Bound Brook, New Jersey
- Territory: United States
- Independence: October 14, 1950; 76 years ago
- Recognition: Autonomy granted and recognised on March 12, 1995 by the Ecumenical Patriarchate of Constantinople
- Branched from: Ukrainian Autocephalous Orthodox Church in Diaspora
- Absorbed: Ukrainian Orthodox Church of America (1936–1996)
- Congregations: 89(2020)
- Members: 14,971(2020), 50,000 (baptized members, 2015)
- Seminaries: 1
- Official website: https://www.uocofusa.org/

The Ukrainian Orthodox Church of the USA (UOC of USA) (Note: Greek: Οὐκρανική Ορθόδοξος Εκκλησία ἐν HΠΑ; Spanish: Iglesia ortodoxa ucraniana EE. UU.; Ukrainian: Українська православна церква США, romanized: Ukrainska pravoslavna tserkva SSHA.) is an Eastern Orthodox body of the Ukrainian diaspora under the jurisdiction of the Ecumenical Patriarchate in the United States. It consists of two eparchies (dioceses), ruled by two bishops, including about 85 active parishes and missions as of 2021. The church is currently governed by Metropolitan Anthony Scharba and Archbishop Daniel Zelinsky. Its head offices and consistory are based in South Bound Brook, New Jersey.

The church is a member of the Assembly of Canonical Orthodox Bishops of the United States of America, being part of the Ecumenical Patriarchate along with the Greek Orthodox Archdiocese, the Carpatho-Russian Orthodox Diocese, and the Albanian Orthodox Diocese. It also is a member of the interdenominational National Council of Churches.

In 2020, the UOC of USA had 14,971 congregants, with 6,274 regular attendees in 89 churches. In 2015, the UOC of USA claimed to have 50,000 baptized members.

== History ==
=== Background ===
In 1922, several Ukrainian Greek Catholic clergy left Rome and joined the Eastern Orthodox Church. Joseph Zuk, who converted to Eastern Orthodoxy, was consecrated by Aftimios Ofiesh of the canonically disputed American Orthodox Catholic Church in 1932. The diocese he led in this church—the Ukrainian Orthodox Church in America—would join the Ecumenical Patriarchate of Constantinople by 1936.

=== Autocephalous church ===
In 1942, when persecution of the church in Ukraine eased under the German occupation, a number of bishops were consecrated for the Ukrainian Orthodox Church there. One of these bishops, Archbishop Mstyslav (Skrypnyk), was consecrated by bishops of the Ukrainian Autocephalous Orthodox Church and emigrated to Canada in 1948 to head the jurisdiction of the Ukrainian Orthodox Church of Canada. In 1949, however, he moved to the U.S. and joined the group of Bishop Bohdan (Spylka). After Archbishop Mstyslav's departure from Canada (after a disagreement with the Canadian church's governance and dismissal), the Canadian church was headed by Metropolitan Hilarion Ohienko.

In 1950, the two rival jurisdictions held synods (in the same cathedral in New York) at which unification was approved by both, and on October 13, a combined unification synod was held, with both groups signing onto union. A number of clergy and parishes under Bishop Bohdan (Spylka) were unconvinced of the sincerity of the "UOC of USA" group, however, and convinced him to reject the union. Union was proclaimed, but it was not complete, lacking the support of Spylka and those who had convinced him to remain separate. Archbishop Mstyslav joined the new united church—the Ukrainian Orthodox Church of the USA, along with a number of Spylkas' parishes, and the union was celebrated on October 14 by those who participated. He would later become patriarch of the Ukrainian Autocephalous Orthodox Church, which he'd lead until 1993.

After the death of Patriarch Mstyslav, on October 20, 1993 Volodymr (Romaniuk), at that time was the Metropolitan of Chernigov was elected Patriarch of Kyiv and all Rus-Ukraine within the Kyiv Patriarchate; he was also succeeded in the Ukrainian Autocephalous Orthodox Church by Demetrius (Yarema).

=== Renouncing autocephaly and joining the Metropolia of the Ecumenical Patriarchate ===
Following the death of Patriarch Mstyslav in 1993, Archbishop Antony was a candidate at the “Sobor” (conclave) of the mother church in Kyiv, Ukraine, to succeed him as patriarch of the UAOC. Archbishop Antony not elected, and shortly thereafter, together with his followers within the UOC-USA—despite Patriarch Mstyslav's decree to remain independent—entered into communion with the Ecumenical Patriarchate of Constantinople.

On October 6, 2007, the 18th Regular Sobor of the UOC-USA nominated Hieromonk Daniel as bishop-elect for the UOC of the USA. On January 9, 2008, Patriarch Bartholomew and the Great and Holy Synod of Constantinople formally elected and ritually included Archimandrite Daniel in the diptychs as titular bishop of Pamphilon. Bishop Daniel was consecrated as bishop in May 2008, at St. Vladimir Ukrainian Orthodox Cathedral in Parma, Ohio.

=== Schism ===
The act of renouncing autocephaly and entering the omophorion of the Ecumenical Patriarchate, which left the UOC-USA with no direct tie to any of the Orthodox churches in Ukraine, led to several parishes leaving the UOC-USA to enter under the omophorion of the Kyiv Patriarchate in Ukraine, although some supporters of these parishes argued that it is they who remain in the same church and that it is the hierarchy of the UOC-USA which is now in a different church.

A lengthy lawsuit which in 1999 the UOC-USA began against one such parish, the Church of the Holy Ascension in Clifton, New Jersey, discouraged some other parishes from taking similar action. Although New Jersey's Appellate Division eventually sided with the parishioners of Holy Ascension against the UOC-USA and the New Jersey Supreme Court denied certification of the issue, in 2007, the Consistory of the UOC-USA filed another suit against the Church of the Holy Ascension. After this suit was dismissed with prejudice by the Superior Court of New Jersey in June 2008, the UOC-USA filed an appeal, but on August 19, 2009, the Appellate Division affirmed the dismissal, holding "that Holy Ascension, and not the UOC-USA, has title to the property". The UOC-USA again appealed to the New Jersey Supreme Court, which, on December 9, 2009, again denied certification.

Despite the court ruling, the UOC-USA website until 2014 continued to list the Church of the Holy Ascension and several other parishes which were legally part of the UOC-KP as parishes of the UOC-USA.

== Statistics ==
In 2010, the UOC of USA had a total of 22,362 congregants in 101 churches according to the U.S. religion census.

In 2020, Pennsylvania had the most adherents and the highest adherence percentage with 22 congregations and 2,784 members, followed by New Jersey with 1,694 members.

According to the U.S. religion census of 2020, the UOC of USA had 14,971 congregants in 89 parishes. It also had a regular attendee rate of 42%. Maps of parishes and adherents have been published based on 2010 data.

== Structure ==
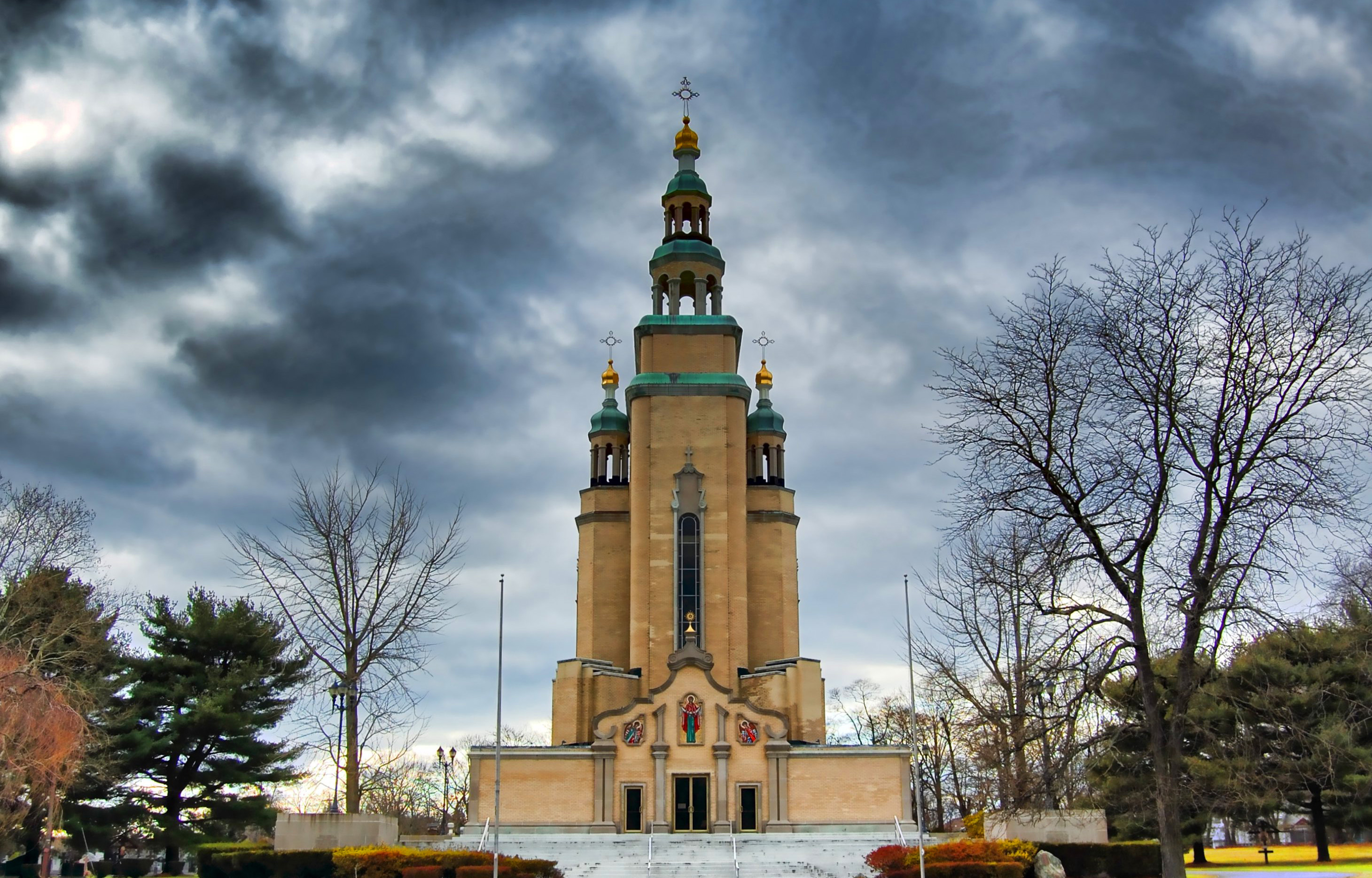
Ukrainian Orthodox Cathedral of St. Andrew in South Bound Brook

=== Eparchies ===
As of 2018 the Ukrainian Orthodox Church in the USA was divided into two eparchies (bishoprics):

- Eastern Eparchy (North Carolina, Connecticut, Delaware, Massachusetts, Maryland, New Jersey, New York City, Eastern Pennsylvania, Rhode Island, Virginia), headed by Metropolitan Antony (New York City, New York-Washington D.C.)
- Western Eparchy (Arizona, California, Illinois, Indiana, Michigan, Minnesota, Nebraska, New Mexico, Oklahoma, Oregon, Washington, Wisconsin, Florida, Georgia, Ohio, Upstate New York, Western Pennsylvania), headed by Archbishop Daniel (Chicago, Illinois)

In total, the UOC of USA has about 80 parishes and one seminary: St. Sophia Ukrainian Orthodox Theological Seminary in South Bound Brook, New Jersey. Many parishes have been closing despite moves over the past few years to conduct the liturgy in English and appoint convert priests to appeal to the masses. Besides the two hierarchs, the clergy consist of roughly 106 priests and 15 deacons. 15 of the parishes currently have either no pastor or are served by clergy in their deanery.

In 1995 to 2012 there existed a Central Eparchy with its see in Parma, Ohio which was ultimately merged with the Western Eparchy.

=== Current bishops ===
| Name | Rank | Title | Consecration | |
| Name | Rank | Title | Date | Lead consecrator |
|---|---|---|---|---|
| Anthony Scharba | Metropolitan | of Hierapolis | October 6, 1985 | Mstyslav (Skrypnyk) |
| Daniel Zelinsky | Archbishop | of Pamphylia | May 10, 2008 | Constantine (Buggan) |

=== Former bishops ===
- Germanos Shehadi, Metropolitan (1872–1934), consecrated by Meletius II of Antioch (Greek Orthodox Patriarchate of Antioch) on 12 September 1904
- Joseph Žuk, Bishop (1872–1934), consecrated by Aftimios Ofiesh (American Orthodox Catholic Church) on 24 September 1932
- Bohdan Spilka, Metropolitan of Evkarpia (1892–1965), consecrated by Athenagoras I of Constantinople on 28 February 1937
- Mstyslav Skrypnyk, Patriarch of Ukraine (1898–1993), consecrated by Nikanor Abramovych on 14 May 1942
- Hennadij Shyprykevych, Archbishop (1892–1972), consecrated by Polycarp Sikorsky on 24 May 1942 (left in 1962 for the Ukrainian Autocephalous Orthodox Church Assembly-ruled)
- Volodymyr Maletz, Archbishop (1890–1967), consecrated by Nikanor Abramovych on 23 June 1942
- John Theodorovych, Metropolitan of Ukrainian Orthodox Church of the USA (1887–1971), consecrated by Christopher Contogeorge on 27 August 1949
- Andrei Kushchak, Metropolitan of Evkarpia (1901–1986), consecrated by Iakovos of America on 28 January 1967
- Iov Skakalsky, Archbishop of Latin America Eparchy (–1974), consecrated in 1968
- Alexander Novytskyj, Bishop (–1970)
- Mark Hundiak, Archbishop (1895–1984), consecrated on 30 May 1970
- Constantine of Irinoupolis, Metropolitan of Irinoupolis (1936–2012), consecrated by Mstyslav Skrypnyk on 7 May 1972
- Volodymyr Haj, Archbishop of Latin America Eparchy (–1977), consecrated on 27 October 1974
- Nicholas Smisko, Bishop of Amissos (1936–2011), consecrated by Iakovos of America on 13 March 1983 (became a Primate of the American Carpatho-Russian Orthodox Diocese in 1984)
- Vsevolod Majdansky, Archbishop of Scopelos (1927–2007), consecrated by Iakovos of America on 27 September 1987
- Paisij Iwaschuk, Bishop of Dafnousia (1913–1998), consecrated on 26 March 1989 (retired in 1992)

=== Primates (UOC of USA) ===
- 1924–1971 John Theodorovych, Metropolitan of Ukrainian Orthodox Church of the USA, re-consecrated by Christopher Contogeorge on 27 August 1949
- 1971–1993 Mstyslav Skrypnyk, Patriarch of Kyiv and all Ukraine (1990–1993), consecrated by Nikanor Abramovych on 14 May 1942
- 1993–2012 Constantine of Irinoupolis, Metropolitan of Irinoupolis, consecrated by Mstyslav Skrypnyk on 7 May 1972
- 2012–present Anthony Scharba, Metropolitan of Hierapolis, consecrated by Mstyslav Skrypnyk on 6 October 1985

=== Primates (UOC in America) ===
- 1931–1934 Joseph Žuk, Bishop, consecrated by Aftimios Ofiesh (American Orthodox Catholic Church) on 24 September 1932
- 1937–1965 Bohdan Spilka, Metropolitan of Evkarpia, consecrated by Athenagoras I of Constantinople on 28 February 1937
- 1967–1986 Andrei Kushchak, Metropolitan of Evkarpia, consecrated by Iakovos of America on 28 January 1967
- 1987–1996 Vsevolod Majdansky, Archbishop of Scopelos, consecrated by Iakovos of America on 27 September 1987

== See also ==
- Ukrainian Autocephalous Orthodox Church
- Ukrainian Autocephalous Orthodox Church in Diaspora
- Ukrainian Orthodox Church of Canada
- History of Christianity in Ukraine
- St. Andrew Cathedral, Silver Spring
- Ukrainian History and Education Center
- Assembly of Canonical Orthodox Bishops of the United States of America

== Bibliography ==
- Text originally taken from Orthodoxwiki:Ukrainian Orthodox Church in the USA
- Hewlett, Dn. Edward. The Formation of the Ukrainian Orthodox Church of Canada
- Surrency, Archim. Serafim. The Quest for Orthodox Church Unity in America: A History of the Orthodox Church in North America in the Twentieth Century. New York: Saints Boris and Gleb Press, 1973.
- Eastern Christian Churches: The Ukrainian Orthodox Church of the US and Diaspora, by Ronald Roberson, a Roman Catholic priest and scholar
- An Outline of the History of the Metropolia Center of the Ukrainian Orthodox Church of the USA (official website)
