= Alexander Inozemtsev =

Aleksandr (Inozemtsev)
- Metropolitan of Pinsk and Polesye
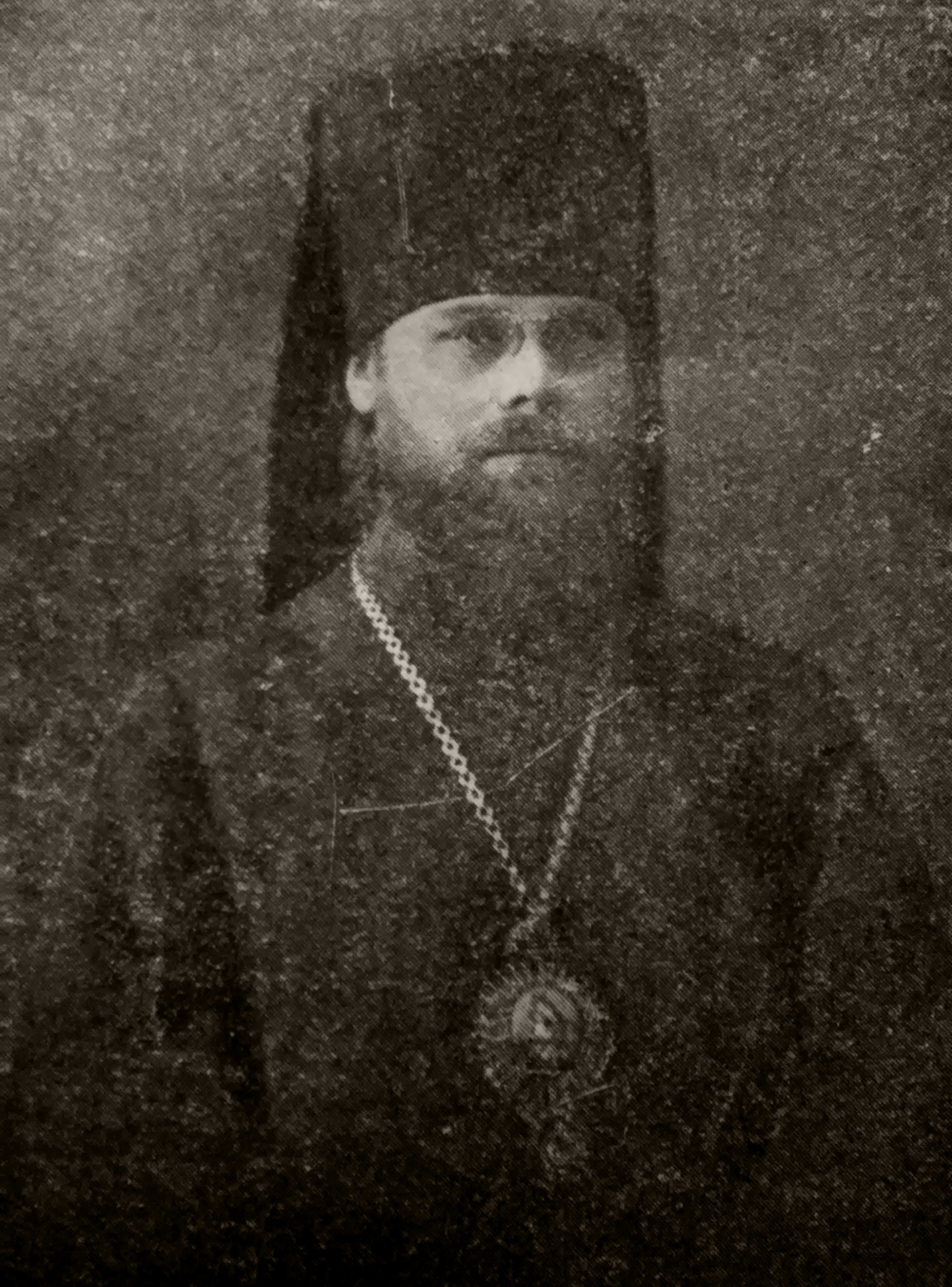
- Church: Polish Orthodox Church; Ukrainian Autocephalous Orthodox Church
- Installed: 1922
- Term ended: 1948
- Predecessor: new post
- Successor: merged to Russian Orthodox Church

Orders
- Ordination: 11 February 1912
- Consecration: 4 June 1922 by Metropolitan George Yaroshevsky, Bishop Dionysius Waledyński

Personal details
- Born: Nikolay Ivanovich Inozemtsev; August 24, 1887 Tobolsk, Tobolsk Governorate, Russian Empire
- Died: February 9, 1948 (aged 60) Munich, Bayern, West Germany

Metropolitan Aleksandr (secular name Nikolay Ivanovich Inozemtsev, Russian: Николай Иванович Иноземцев; August 24, 1887 – February 9, 1948) was a bishop of the Polish Orthodox Church and Ukrainian Autocephalous Orthodox Church.

He was born in 1887 in Tobolsk. He graduated from the Tobolsk Theological Seminary and Academy. In 1910–1913 Aleksandr studied at the Saint Petersburg Theological Academy. During his third year of study he was tonsured a monk by Bishop of Yamburg Georgius (Yaroshevsky), a rector of the Saint Petersburg Theological Academy. He graduated the academy with a Ph.D. in theology awarded for his dissertation about studies of Adventists, after which worked as an inspector assistant at the academy in Saint Petersburg. In September 1918 on orders of the Holiest Patriarch Tikhon of Moscow, he was elevated to the rank of archimandrite and dispatched as an eparchial (diocesan) missioner to Minsk.

In December 1918 with the withdrawal of Germany forces from the Eastern front following the World War I, Aleksandr came to Ukraine, but in 1919 he emigrated to Italy.

In October 1921, Aleksandr came to Poland on invitation of Archbishop Georgius (Yaroshevsky), Patriarchal Exarch of Poland and was appointed as a member of the Warsaw and Chelm Theological Consistory. On 4 June 1922 he was ordained as Bishop of Lublin, vicar of Warsaw and Chelm eparchy (diocese) and on 12 June 1922 takes over as ruling bishop of Pinsk and Navahrudak eparchy (diocese). He participated in establishing of the Polish Orthodox Church following persecutions of Patriarch Tikhon by Bolsheviks in Moscow.

On 11 December 1925 Aleksandr was appointed as a Bishop of Pinsk and Polesye and on 3 June 1927 being elevated to rank of archbishop. During the World War II following the 1939 Soviet invasion of Poland and annexation of West Ukraine and Belarus by the Soviet Union, the Russian Orthodox Church claims that he returned to church but was not able to arrive to Moscow for actual approval and by letter asked to retirement which was approved.

With invasion of the Soviet Union by Nazi Germany, Archbishop Alexandr remained at his eparchy and on 8–10 February 1942 headed the Bishop Assembly in establishing the Ukrainian Autocephalous Orthodox Church (UAOC) along with another bishop of Polish Orthodox Church Polikarp (Sikorsky) and approval of the primate of Polish Orthodox Church, Metropolitan Dionizy (Waledyński). At the Assembly he ordained three bishops for UAOC. In August 1942 he headed another assembly of UAOC where he was elevated to rank of Metropolitan.

In summber of 1944 Metropolitan Aleksandr was forced to emigration due to the Soviet advancement moving to Munich where he came in contact with the Russian Orthodox Church Abroad (ROCOR) trying to join it. On 15 May 1946 the Synod of ROCOR condemned creation of UAOC and excommunicated Aleksandr. At the end of February 1948 Aleksandr was found dead his apartment under uncertain circumstances.
