= St. Andrew's Cathedral (Silver Spring, Maryland) =

Ukrainian Orthodox cathedral

Coordinates: 39.1039°N 77.0049°W

St. Andrew Cathedral
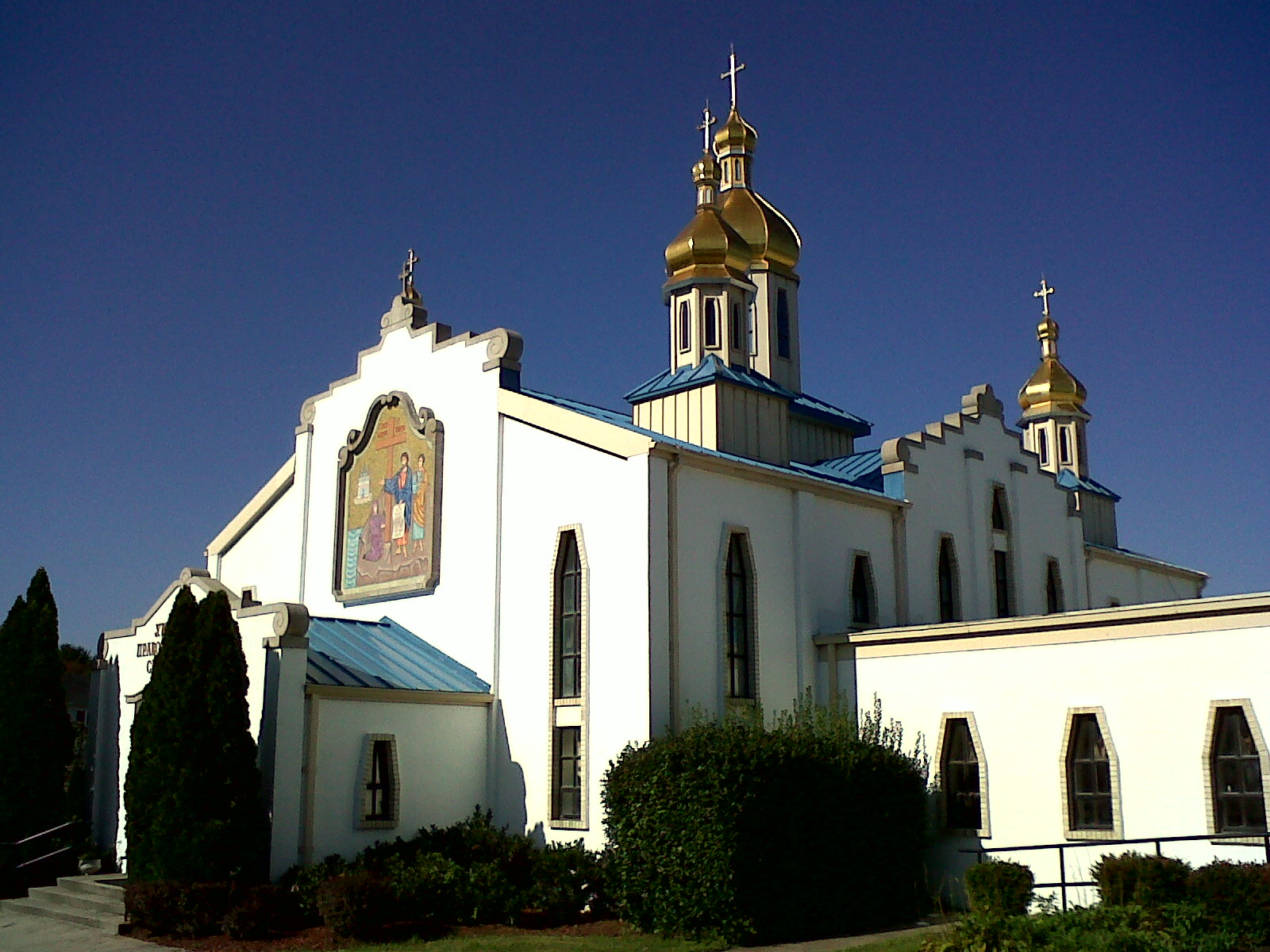

Religion
- Affiliation: Ukrainian Orthodox Church of the USA
- Rite: Byzantine Rite
- Leadership: Archbishop: Archbishop Antony; Pastor: Father Volodymyr Steliac
- Year consecrated: 1988

Location
- Location: 15100 New Hampshire Avenue; Silver Spring, Maryland; United States
- Interactive map of St. Andrew Cathedral

Architecture
- Architect: M. Nimtsev
- Type: Cathedral
- Style: Kozak Baroque
- Completed: 1987
- Dome: Five

Website
- www.standrewuoc.org

St. Andrew Cathedral is a Ukrainian Orthodox cathedral at 15100 New Hampshire Avenue in Silver Spring, Maryland, United States. It is the seat of the Archbishop of New York-Washington.

== History ==
St. Andrew’s Parish was founded with a membership of 65 families in the Washington, D.C. area in 1949. The community initially met in rented buildings until it bought and renovated a structure on 16th Street. The congregation purchased the property in Silver Spring in 1986 and commissioned a church building in the Kozak Baroque style. That same year the nuclear disaster at Chernobyl occurred and the church was dedicated in memory of the victims. The church building was finished the following year and it was consecrated on April 24, 1988. It features a mosaic of its patron, St. Andrew, above the entrance on the street façade and five cupolas with gilt Onion domes.
