= Vasyl Lypkivsky =

Metropolitan Vasyl (Lypkivsky)
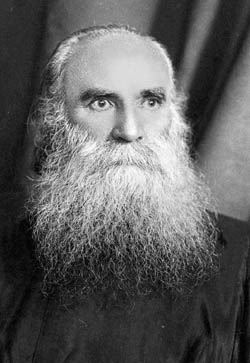
- One of the last photos of Metropolitan Vasyl (Lypkivsky)
- Born: 7 September 1864; Popudnya in Kyiv Governorate
- Died: 27 November 1937 (aged 73); Kyiv

Vasyl Kostiantynovych Lypkivsky (Ukrainian: Василь Костянтинович Липківський; 7 September 1864 – 27 November 1937) was the founder of the Ukrainian Autocephalous Orthodox Church and the first independently consecrated "Metropolitan of Kyiv and All Ukraine" (1921–1927).

== Education and early ministry ==
Vasyl Lypkivsky was born in the village of Popudnya in the Kyiv Governorate (now Cherkasy Oblast), where his father was a priest.

In 1873 he began his education at the Uman Theological Seminary and graduated from the Kyiv Theological Academy in 1889 with the title of Candidate of Theology. On 20 October 1891 he was ordained as a priest. He ministered in the Lipovets region, staying there for a period of eleven years. In 1903 he was transferred to Kyiv and was appointed as director of the School for Teachers of Religion in Kyiv. Because of his participation in the Ukrainian ecclesiastic movement, he was removed from his position in 1905 and transferred to the parish of Kyiv-Solomenka in the capacity of prior.

== Involvement in the independence movement ==
During this time the Eastern Orthodox Church in Ukraine remained part of the Russian Orthodox Church until Ukraine affirmed its independence in the chaotic situation following World War I and the Russian revolution. In 1905, Lypkivsky became President of the Congress of Clergymen. Because of his Ukrainophilia and liberal views, he fell in disgrace with his superiors. One of his campaigns was for the use of Ukrainian language instead of the Church Slavonic language being used in church services. In 1917, he was again President of the Congress of Clergymen and Laymen. At this congress, a resolution for the autocephaly of the Ukrainian Orthodox Church was made.

The government of the new Ukrainian Republic passed a law allowing for the founding of a Ukrainian Autocephalous Orthodox Church in 1919. Under his supervision, the first religious service in the Ukrainian language took place at the St. Nicholas Military Cathedral in Kyiv on 9 May (Old Style) 1919. For this reason, the Russian bishops prohibited his religious services and deprived him of his clerical title. For the time being, an unstructured association in favor of ending ties with the Russian church was gaining ground among the Ukrainian Orthodox faithful.

== Creation of the Ukrainian Autocephalous Orthodox Church ==
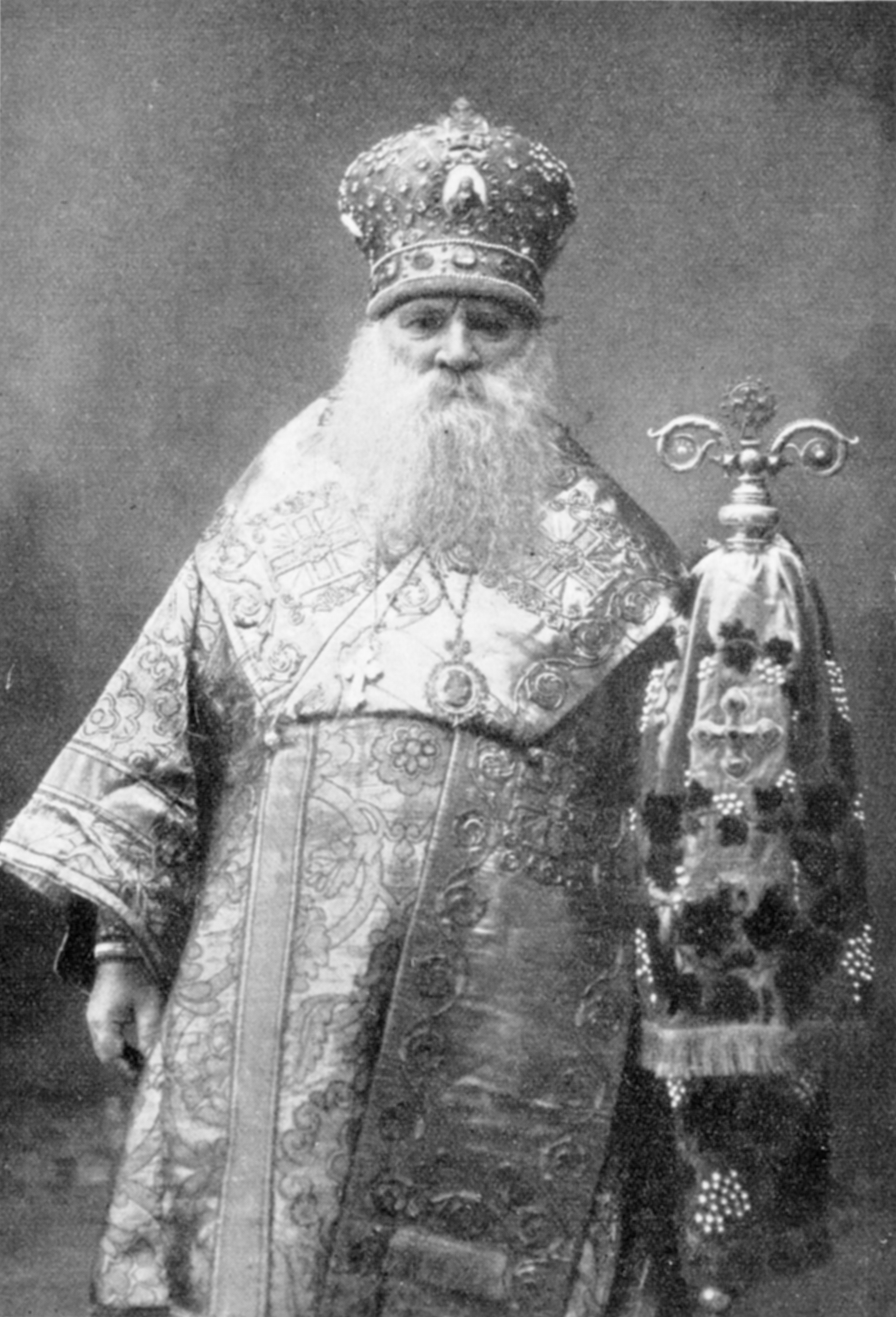
Metropolitan Vasyl (Lypkivsky) in 1921.

The move for autonomy from Russia led to the assertion of Ukrainian autocephaly at the First All-Ukrainian Orthodox Church Council on 23 October 1921. Since no Orthodox bishop would take part in this action, the council decided to ordain its leader, Archpriest Vasyl Lypkivsky, as Metropolitan of Kiev and All Ukraine for the Ukrainian Autocephalous Orthodox Church through the laying-on-of-hands by the priests and laypeople present (similar to the early ordinations in the Church of Alexandria). Because of this method, this church was never acknowledged by any other Eastern Orthodox church. However, by early 1924 the new church had 30 bishops and approximately 1,500 priests and deacons serving in nearly 1,100 parishes in the Ukrainian Soviet Socialist Republic, with possibly as many as six million faithful.

== Persecution, arrest and death ==
Lipkivsky spent the whole period of his office as Metropolitan travelling to parishes throughout Ukraine. Under Soviet rule the authorities at first viewed the Ukrainian Orthodox Church in a positive way as a counterweight to the Russian Orthodox Church, but by the late 1920s they saw it as a dangerous expression of Ukrainian nationalism. During his time as Metropolitan he was arrested by authorities of the Soviet government several times. The authorities often prohibited his departures from Kyiv and travel to parishes in Ukraine. Upon demands of the Soviet government, he was removed from his position as Metropolitan at the Second All-Ukrainian Orthodox Church Council in 1927.

In 1927, he was placed under house arrest, whereby his permission to depart from Kyiv and to conduct religious services in the churches of the city of Kyiv was withdrawn. His arrest in quarters continued from 1927 to 1937. Under threat of Soviet repression, the Ukrainian Orthodox Church dissolved itself and accepted incorporation into the Russian-dominated Moscow Patriarchate in 1930.

In February 1937, Metropolitan Vasyl (Lypkivsky) was arrested by the Russian Secret Police, the NKVD. In 1937 he was sentenced to death by the decree of an NKVD troika, and was executed on 27 November 1937.

In 1989, he was politically "rehabilitated" by the Soviet government.

| Preceded by - | Metropolitan of Kyiv and All Ukraine (UAOC); 1921–1927 | Succeeded by Mykola (Boretsky) |
