= Constantine Buggan =

American Ukrainian Orthodox metropolitan and primate (1936–2012)

His Eminence Constantine
- Metropolitan of Irinoupolis, Primate of the Ukrainian Orthodox Church of the USA
- Native name: Митрополит Константин
- Church: Ukrainian Orthodox Church of the USA
- Appointed: March 11, 1995
- Term ended: May 21, 2012
- Predecessor: Mstyslav (Skrypnyk)
- Successor: Anthony (Scharba)
- Previous posts: Bishop of Chicago (1972-1987); Archbishop of Chicago (1987-1993)

Orders
- Ordination: 23 July 1967 by John (Theodorovich)
- Consecration: 7 May 1972

Personal details
- Born: Theodore Stanislavovich Buggan; July 29, 1936 Pittsburgh, Pennsylvania, United States
- Died: May 21, 2012 (aged 75) Pittsburgh, Pennsylvania, United States
- Denomination: Eastern Orthodox

Metropolitan Constantine (Note: Ukrainian: Митрополит Константин, romanized: Mytropolyt Konstantyn) (b. July 29, 1936 – d. May 21, 2012) (Secular name: Theodore Stanislavovich Buggan) (Note: Ukrainian: Федір Станиславович Баган, romanized: Fedir Stanyslavovych Bahan) was the Metropolitan of Irinoupolis, and Primate of the Ukrainian Orthodox Church of the USA (UOC of USA) and of the Ukrainian Autocephalous Orthodox Church in Diaspora, which are jurisdictions of the Ecumenical Patriarchate in the United States and the Ukrainian diaspora. The primatial cathedral is in Parma, Ohio (St. Vladimir Cathedral), and the Church's head offices and Consistory are based in South Bound Brook, New Jersey.

== Early life ==
Metropolitan Constantine was born in Pittsburgh on July 19, 1936, to Stanley (Stanislav) and Catherine Buggan, a Ukrainian family. Upon completion of his secondary education he entered the College of St. Andrew, in Winnipeg (an affiliate college with the University of Manitoba), Canada, from which he graduated in 1959. He also studied at Saint Vladimir's Orthodox Theological Seminary in Crestwood, New York and Duquesne University, receiving a doctorate in philosophy from the latter.

== Priesthood and episcopacy ==
On April 23, 1967, he was ordained deacon in South Bound Brook, New Jersey by Metropolitan Mstyslav (Skrypnyk) (future first patriarch of the Ukrainian Orthodox Church Kyivan Patriarchate), and a priest on July 23 by Metropolitan John (Theodorovich), in Pittsburgh. His pastoral work comprised St. Vladimir Cathedral in Chicago, Illinois and at St Nicholas Church in Troy, New York.

Father Theodore was tonsured a monk on December 18, 1971, receiving the name Constantine, and on May 7, 1972, he was consecrated by Metropolitan Mstyslav (Skrypnyk) to the Chicago cathedra of the Ukrainian Orthodox Church in America (UOC in America). In 1977 he was elevated to the rank of archbishop, and to metropolitan in 1992. After the death of Patriarch Mstyslav (Skrypnyk) in 1993 he became the Primate of the UOC in America, and in 1994, of the Ukrainian Autocephalous Orthodox Church in Diaspora.

From 1995 to 1996, the UOC in America and the Ukrainian Autocephalous Orthodox Church in Diaspora entered in communion with the Ecumenical Patriarchate of Constantinople, and Metropolitan Constantine received the titular diocese of Irinoupolis.

== Death ==
Constantine of Irinoupolis died from congestive heart failure on May 21, 2012, in Pittsburgh, Pennsylvania at the age of 75.
