= Anthony Scharba =

Eastern Orthodox bishop

His Eminence Anthony
- Metropolitan of the Ukrainian Orthodox Church of the USA
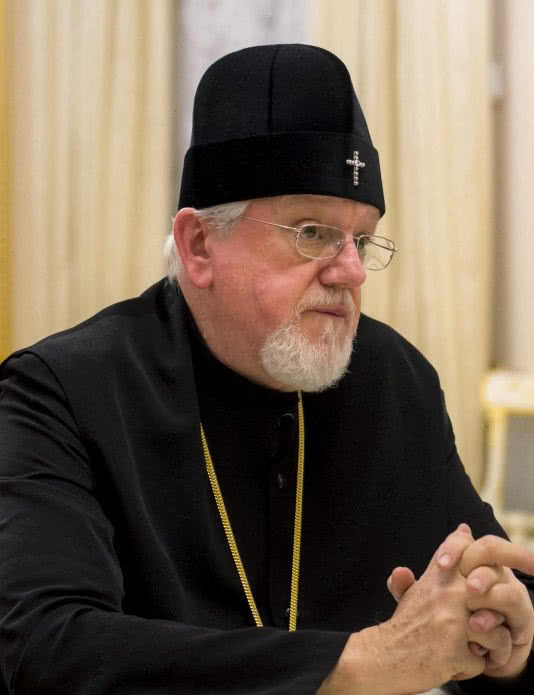
- Church: Ukrainian Orthodox Church of the USA
- Appointed: November 14, 2012
- Predecessor: Constantine (Buggan)

Orders
- Ordination: 26 November 1972 by Constantine (Buggan)
- Consecration: 6 October 1985

Personal details
- Born: John Ivanovych Scharba; January 30, 1947 (age 79) Sharon, Pennsylvania, United States
- Denomination: Eastern Orthodox

Metropolitan Anthony (Secular name: John Ivanovych Scharba (Note: Ukrainian: Іван Іванович Щерба, romanized: Ivan Ivanovych Shcherba)) (b. January 30, 1947) is an American Orthodox hierarch who is the Metropolitan of Ierapolis, and Primate of the Ukrainian Orthodox Church of the USA (UOC of the USA) since 2012. He is also the primate of the Ukrainian Autocephalous Orthodox Church in Diaspora since 2015.

== Early life and education ==
Scharba was born John Ivanovych Scharba on January 30, 1947, in Sharon, Pennsylvania, USA, to Ivan and Dorofei Scharba. On March 23 of the same year, he was baptized in the Ukrainian Church of John the Baptist in his hometown.

Scharba received his primary and secondary education in Sharpsville. After he graduated from high school, he enrolled in the Edinboro University of Pennsylvania in order to prepare for a lay career in as an international journalist. Two years later, Scharba entered St. Andrew's College in Winnipeg, Manitoba, Canada. At the same time, he also entered the University of Manitoba, where the St. Andrew's Seminary campus is located. He graduated from the UM in 1970 with a bachelor's degree in sociology and then graduated from St. Andrews Seminary in 1971 with a degree in theology. He remained in Winnipeg, accepting an offer to serve as the resident dean of St. Andrew's College.

== Ordination ==
On October 1, 1972, Scharba was ordained a deacon by Bishop Constantine at the St. Vladimir Ukrainian Orthodox Cathedral in Parma, Ohio. Then on November 26, he was ordained a priest at the Church of St. John the Baptist in Sharon. By December, Scharba was sent to the parish of Ambridge and was transferred to Hammond, Indiana, in 1976. While he was at Hammond, Scharba studied at the theological faculty at Loyola University Chicago and Purdue University. On May 29, 1985, he took monastic vows under the name Anthony in honor of Anthony the Great and he was elevated to archimandrite. On October 6, he was consecrated as the bishop of New York and was ordained by Metropolitan Mstyslav (Skrypnyk) at St. Andrew Memorial Church in South Bound Brook, New Jersey. On March 11-12, 1995, Anthony was elevated to archbishop.

== Primate of the UOC-USA ==
Following the death of the Metropolitan Constatine, on May 21, 2012, Archbishop Anthony was elected locum tenens of the UOC of the USA. On October 6, the Council of Clergy and Laity elected him as their primate. On November 14, the election was approved by Patriarch Bartholomew I of Constantinople. In addition, Metropolitan Anthony became locum tenens of the UAOC in the Diaspora. The enthronement took place on January 26, 2013, at the Ukrainian Orthodox Cathedral of St. Andrew in Silver Spring, Maryland.

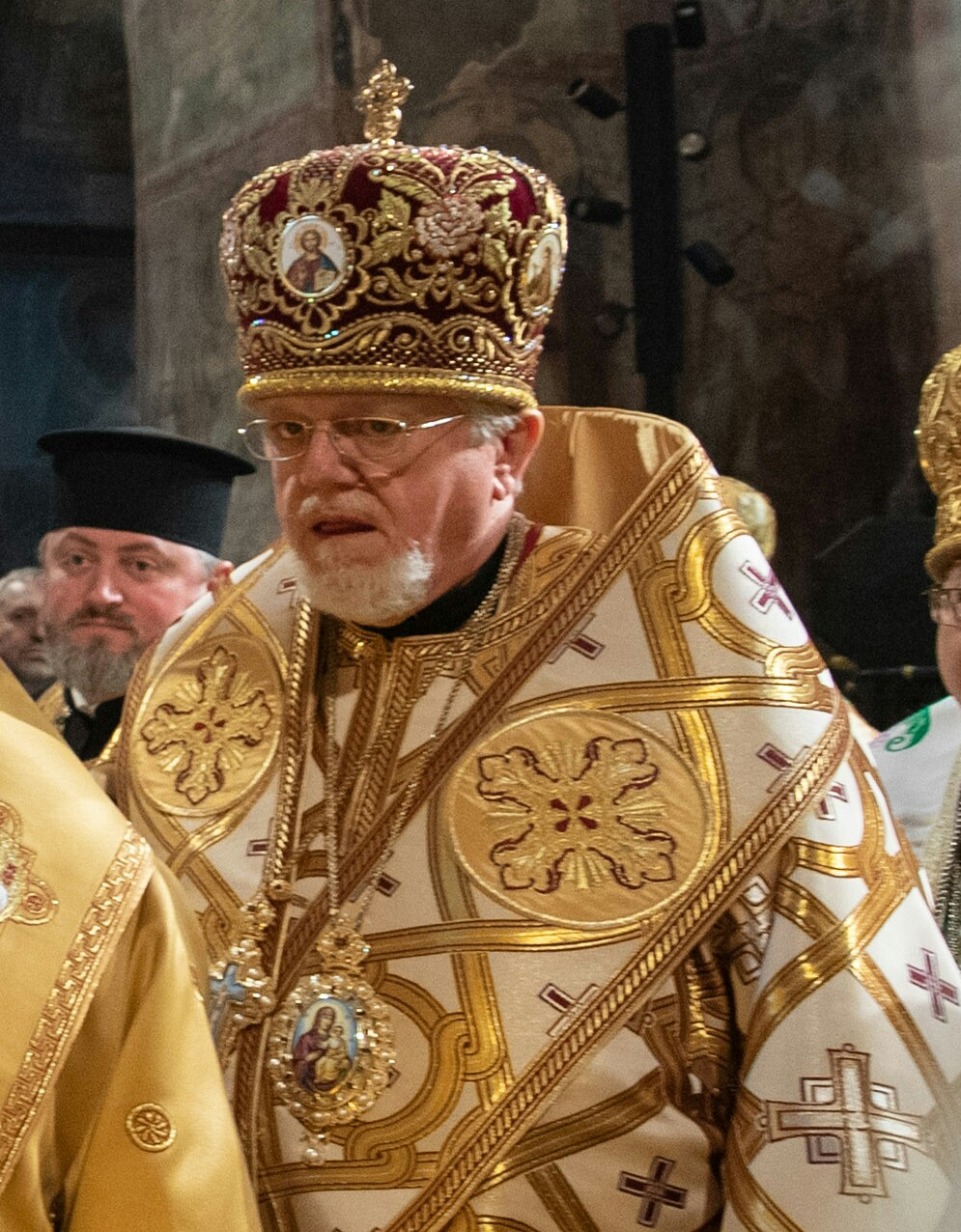
Metropolitan Anthony at the enthronement of Primate of the OCU, Metropolitan Epiphanius of Kyiv.

At the council of the UAOC in the Diaspora of October 30-November 1, 2015, Metropolitan Anthony was officially elected Metropolitan of the UAOC in the Diaspora.
