= Ukrainian History and Education Center =

American museum and archives focused on Ukrainian and Ukrainian-American history

Coordinates: 40.5428°N 74.5194°W

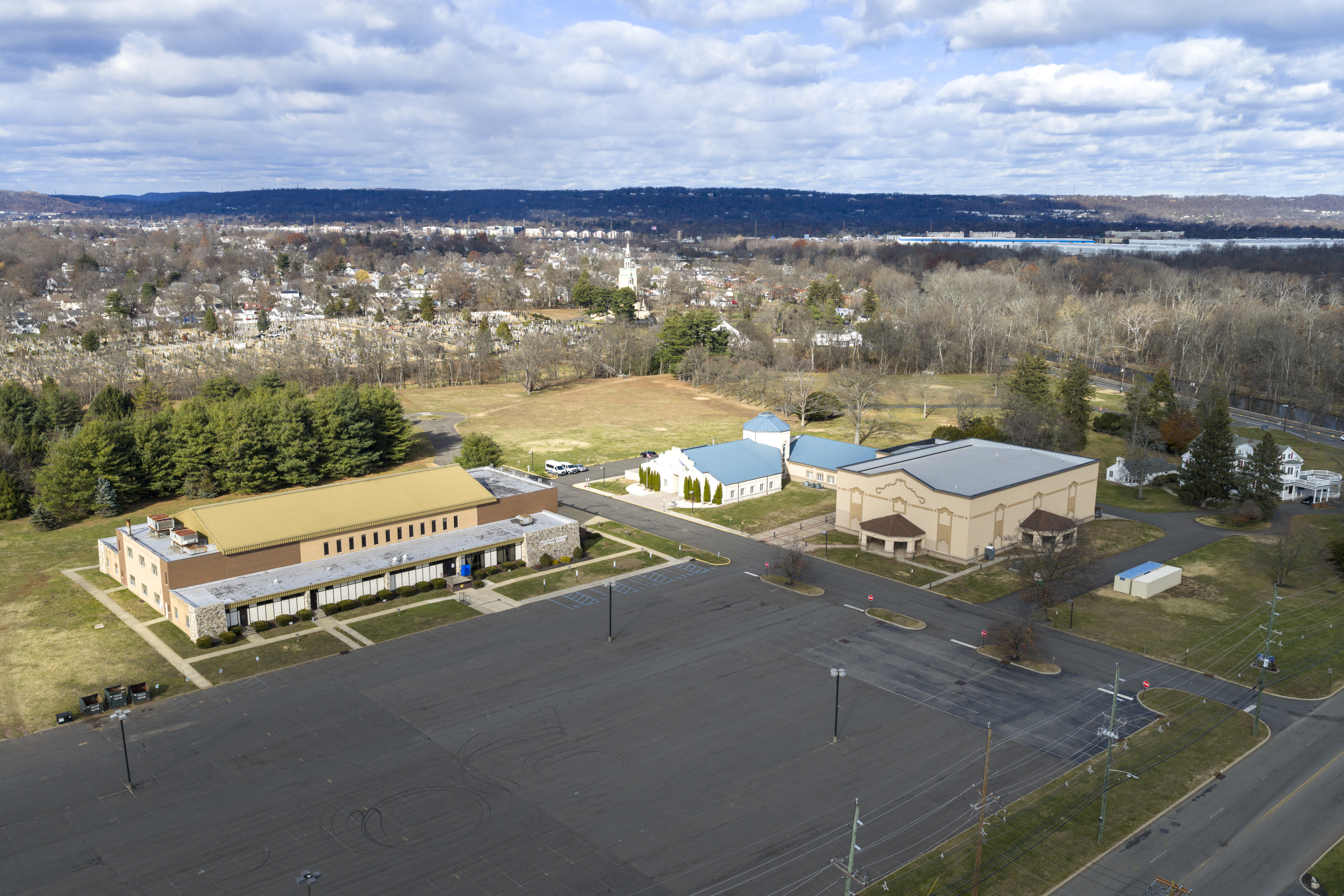
- An aerial view of the Ukrainian History and Education Center and surrounding facilities.
- Location: Somerset, New Jersey, US
- Type: History and cultural museum
- Founder: Ukrainian Orthodox Church of the USA
- Website: www.ukrhec.org

The Ukrainian History and Education Center, also known as UHEC, is a museum and archives at 135 Davidson Avenue in the Somerset section of Franklin Township, New Jersey, that focuses on the history of Ukraine and Ukrainian Americans.

== Collection and exhibitions ==
The Ukrainian History and Education Center hosts community events and new exhibits, in addition to a permanent collection of over 15,000 objects of folk art, fine art, religious ritual objects, and textiles. Furthermore, UHEC works to archive historical documents of Ukrainian and Ukrainian American cultural, religious, and political history. Largely through personal donations over the years, the UHEC Archives collection consists of hundreds of documents about the lives and work of Ukrainian and Ukrainian American individuals, families, and organizations. The organization provides access to the special collections and archives to researchers.

=== Response to the 2022 Russian invasion of Ukraine ===
In response to the 2022 Russian invasion of Ukraine, UHEC archivist Michael Andrec has given talks throughout the state of NJ, addressing the historical and cultural context of the war while also correcting and examining Russian propaganda used to justify the war.
