= Joseph Žuk =

Bishop of Ukrainian Orthodox Church in America

Joseph Žuk (d. February 24, 1934) was bishop of the Ukrainian Orthodox Church of North America. He was born in Eastern Galicia. He was educated at the Lviv Seminary and the University of Rome, where he graduated a Doctorate of Divinity. He was at one time Rector of the Lviv Seminary. He moved to the United States in 1922. He was made pastor of St. Nicholas Ukrainian Church in Passaic, New Jersey, in 1923, and was moved to a church in Allentown, Pennsylvania, in January 1924. He was consecrated bishop in 1932, within the American Orthodox Catholic Church by Aftimios Ofiesh.

== Sources ==
- "Bishop Zuk Dies at 60 in Florida". The New York Times. February 25, 1934. p. 31.
- "Rev. Joseph Zuk in Allentown". Passaic Daily Herald. January 5, 1924.
- "South Side News: Coming to McAdoo". Standard-Speaker. Hazleton, Pennsylvania. October 6, 1924. p. 11.
- "Ukrainian Bishop's Funeral Thursday". The Tribune. Scranton, Pennsylvania. February 27, 1934. p. 22.
