= Polycarp Sikorsky =

Polycarp (Sikorsky)
- Primate of Ukrainian Autocephalous Orthodox Church
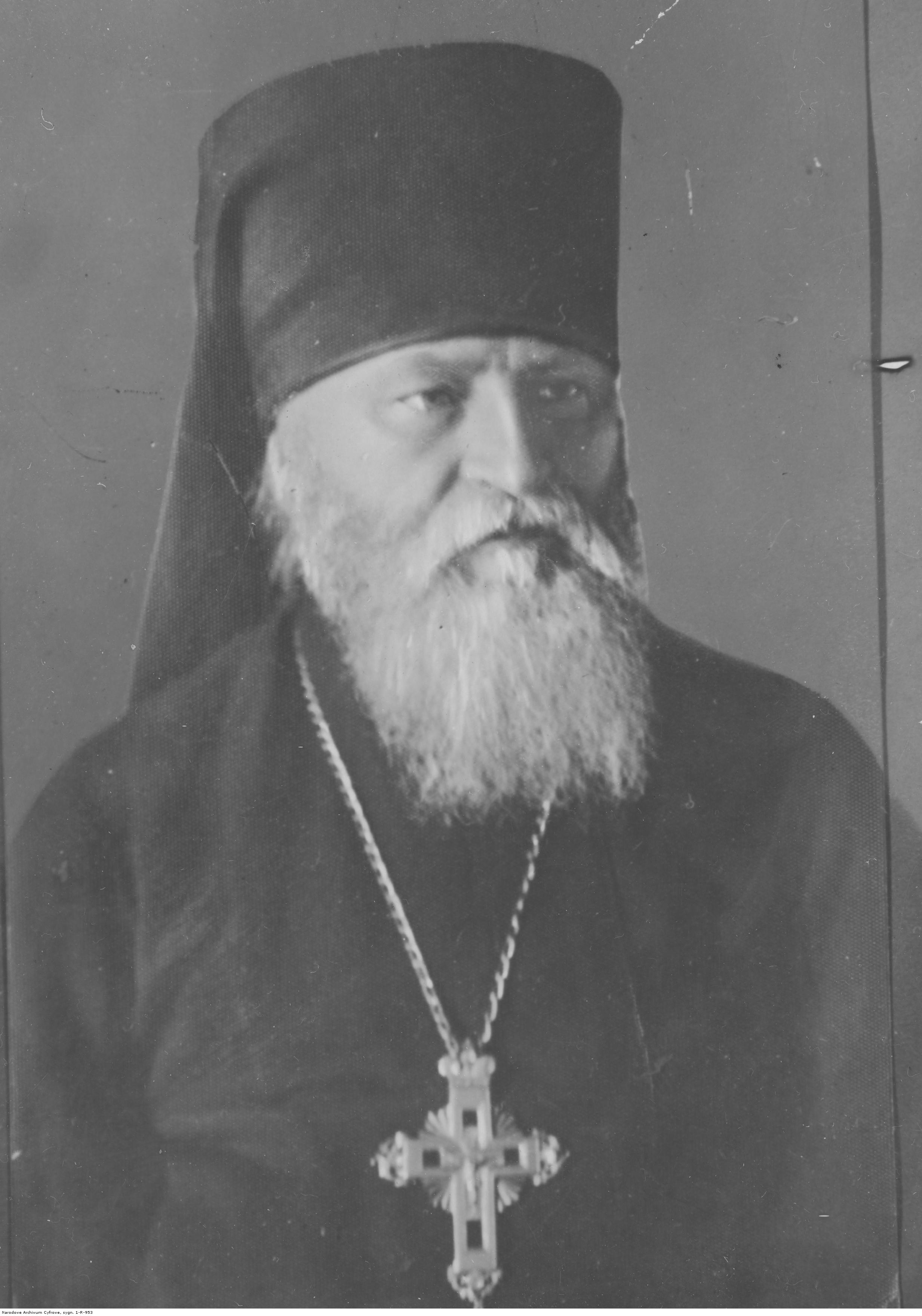
- Church: Ukrainian Autocephalous Orthodox Church and Ukrainian Autocephalous Orthodox Church in Diaspora
- Installed: 1941
- Term ended: 1953
- Predecessor: Ioann (Pavlovsky) (Ukrainian Autocephalous Orthodox Church, 1919-1937) Anthony (Vinnytsky) (Ukrainian Orthodox Church, 1620–1679)
- Successor: Nykanor (Abramovych)

Orders
- Ordination: 1922
- Consecration: 10 April 1932 by Metropolitan Dionizy (Waledyński)

Personal details
- Born: Petro Dmytrovych Sikorsky; July 2, 1875 near Myronivka, Kiev Governorate, Russian Empire
- Died: October 22, 1953 (aged 78) Aulnay-sous-Bois, Seine-Saint-Denis, France
- Buried: Père Lachaise Cemetery, Paris

Metropolitan Polycarp (Ukrainian: Митрополит Полікарп, secular name Petro Dmytrovych Sikorsky, Ukrainian: Петро́ Дми́трович Сіко́рський, or Pyotr Dmitriyevich Sikorsky, Russian: Пётр Дми́триевич Сико́рский, Polish: Piotr Sikorski; July 2, 1875 - October 22, 1953) was a bishop of the Polish Orthodox Church and Ukrainian Autocephalous Orthodox Church and later of the Ukrainian Autocephalous Orthodox Church in Diaspora.

He was born in 1875 in a village near Myronivka in a family of priest. He graduated from the Kyiv Theological Seminary in 1898. In 1906 he studied at the Kyiv University Law School (Faculty). Following the Ukrainian independence in 1918-21 Sikorsky served as an official and head of department at the Ukrainian People's Ministry of Confessions.

After the Treaty of Riga in 1920 he stayed in Volhynia. In 1922 he made tonsure to monasticism and was elevated to the rank of archimandrite serving in turns as a hegumen for Derman Holy Trinity Monastery, Velyki Zahaitsi Monastery, and Zhyrovichy Monastery. Sikorski was active in political and community life.

He was consecrated as a Bishop of Lutsk, vicar of Eparchy of Volhynia, by bishops including Dionizy (Waledyński). Following Soviet invasion of Poland and annexation of territories what is now western Ukraine and Belarus, Sikorski refused to join the Moscow Patriarchate and was removed from office of Patriarchal see "locum tenens" by Metropolitan Sergius (Stragorodsky).

In September 1941 Sikorsky was heading "Provisional administration of the Ukrainian Orthodox Church" in Volhynia as Archbishop of Lutsk and Kovel eparchy (diocese). By decree of Metropolitan Dionizy (Waledyński) of 24 December 1941 he was appointed to the position of provisional administrator of "Orthodox Autocephalous Church on liberated lands of Ukraine". Sikorsky initiated the 1942 Hierarchal Assembly in Pinsk which became important in reforming the Ukrainian Church. He was elected as a Metropolitan at the Assembly. Soon thereafter the Nazi security officials searched his house and arrested and later executed his assistants Maliuzhynsky and Mysechko.

On 6 January 1944 Sikorsky emigrated to Warsaw and later to Germany. After the German capitulation he resided in Gronau, North Rhine-Westphalia and later Bad Kissingen, Bavaria. He organized several hierarchal assemblies of the Ukrainian Autocephalous Orthodox Church in exile. In April 1950 Sikorsky moved to France, near Paris where he headed a parish of Saint-Germain.
