= Dionysius Waledyński =

His Eminence Dionysius Waledyński
- Metropolitan of Warsaw and all Poland; Metropolita warszawski i całej Polski
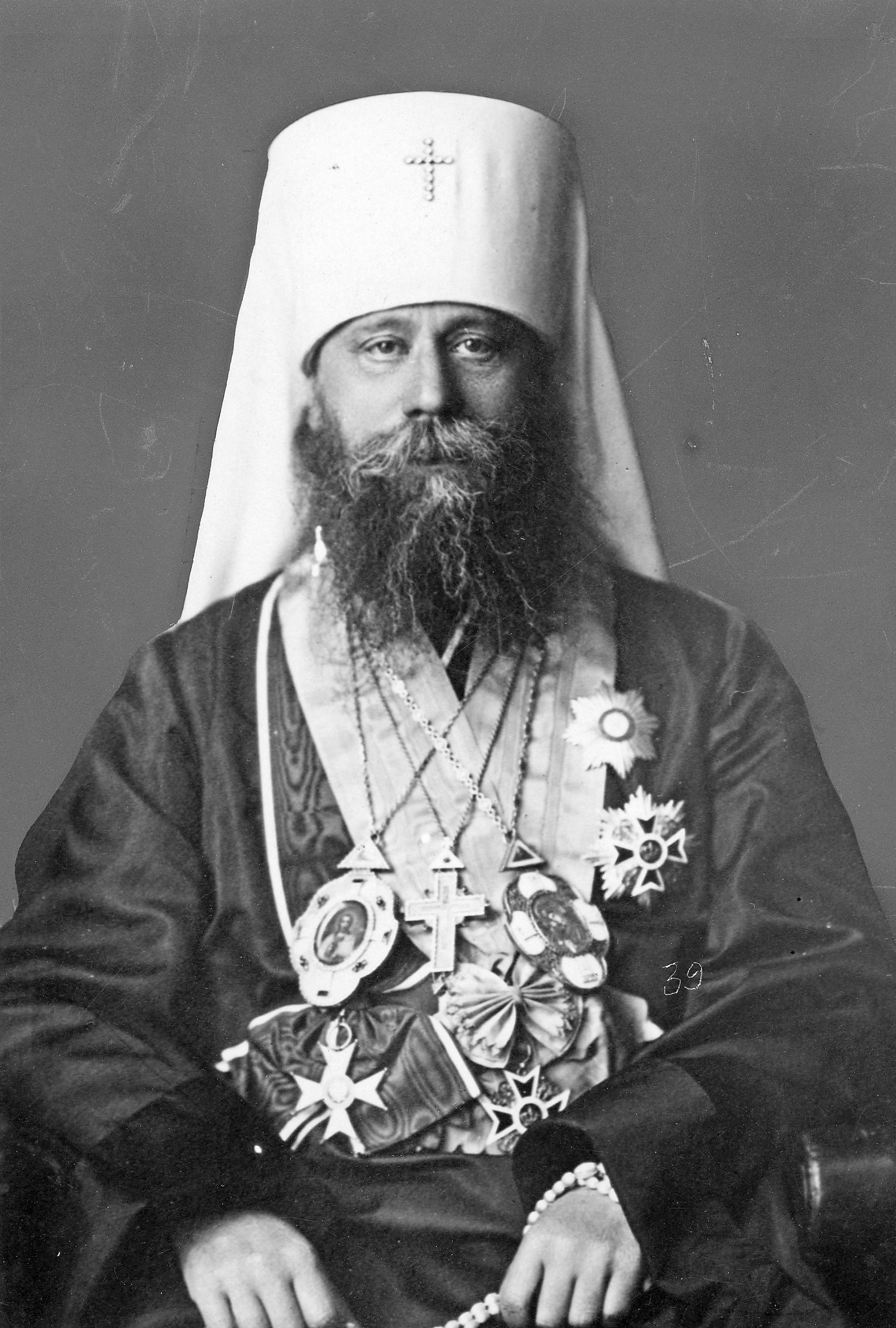
- Metropolitan Dionizy (1928)
- Church: Polish Orthodox Church
- In office: 27 February 1923
- Quashed: 17 April 1948
- Predecessor: George Yaroshevsky
- Successor: Macarius Oksiyuk

Orders
- Rank: Metropolitan

Personal details
- Born: 16 May [O.S. 4 May] 1876 Murom, Vladimir Governorate, Russian Empire
- Died: March 15, 1960 (aged 83) Warsaw, Polish People's Republic
- Buried: Orthodox Cemetery, Warsaw
- Denomination: Eastern Orthodoxy

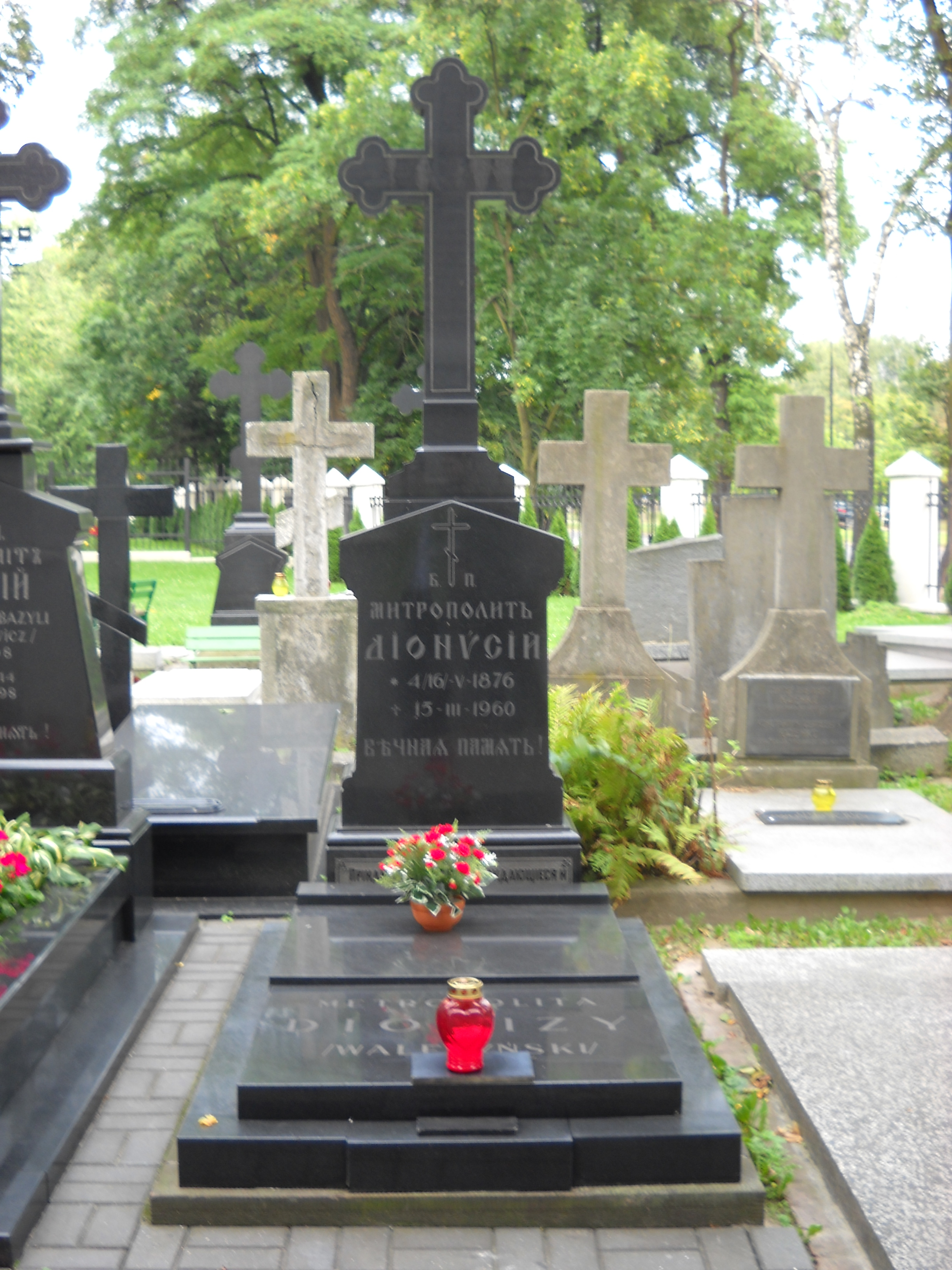
Tomb of Metropolitan Dionizy at the Orthodox Cemetery in Warsaw

Metropolitan Dionysius (born Konstantin Nikolayevich Valedinsky, Russian: Константи́н Никола́евич Валеди́нский; 4 May/16 May 1876 in Murom, Vladimir Governorate, Imperial Russia - 15 March 1960, Warsaw, Poland) was the Metropolitan of Warsaw and all Poland and the primate of the Polish Orthodox Church from 27 February 1923 to 17 April 1948.

Konstantin was born in family of hereditary priests not far from Moscow in 1876. He was a nephew of Arbishop Hieronim (Eksempliarsky) who served as Archbishop of Warsaw (1898 — 1905) and Archbishop of Wilno (1894 — 1898). Konstantin lost his father early when he was only 12. In 1897 Konstantin Valedinsky graduated a theological seminary in Ufa. Already as a student of the Kazan Theological Academy during his first year of study he was tonsured as a monk with the name of Dionysius (Dionisios) and during the same year was consecrated as a deacon. In 1899 Dionysius (Valedinsky) became hieromonk and was consecrated by Antony (Khrapovitsky) as a priest (iereus). He graduated the academy in 1900 as a magister in theology. (candidate of theology) His graduating dissertation was "Ideals of Orthodox-Russian foreign missionary work". Due to his poor health Dionysius was not able to become a missionary. In 1901-02 Dionysius was teaching a history of the Church in the Taurida Theological Seminary in Simferopol.

On 22 December 1902 Dionysius was promoted to archimandrite and in 1902 to 1911 acted as a rector at the Chelm Theological Seminary. In 1911-13 he was a priest of the Russian-Polish Church in Rome, according to other sources, an Eastern Orthodox Church at the Russian Embassy in Rome.

On 21 April 1913 Dionysius was ordained as a vicar bishop of Kremenets of the Volhynian Eparchy. The ceremony took place at the Holy Dormition Pochaiv Lavra and was attended by Patriarch Gregory VII of Antioch (Patriarch Gregory IV of Antioch??). In 1917 Dionysius participated in the All-Russian Local Council representing monks of the Volhynian Eparchy.

During the World War I, Bishop Dionysius (Valedinsky) stayed in Kyiv and in 1918 participated in the All-Ukrainian Orthodox Church Assembly, at which represented the eparchy of Polesie as diocesan bishop. In 1919 he returned to Kremenets. Following the Treaty of Riga, on 1 July 1921 bishop of Kremenets Dionysius was confirmed by the Polish authorities as a bishop of Kremenets and Volhynia and in 1922 became archbishop. In 1918-20 he also ruled over eparchies of Chelm, Lublin and others.

Following the tragic assassination of Metropolitan of Warsaw George Yaroshevsky, on 27 February 1923 he was elected as a Metropolitan of Warsaw and Chelm, First Hierarch of the Orthodox Church of Poland by the Bishop Council of the Orthodox Church in Poland. On 13 March 1923 Ecumenical Patriarch Meletius IV of Constantinople confirmed Dionysius as the Metropolitan of Warsaw, Volhynia and All Poland and the Sacred Archimandrite of the Holy Dormition Pochaiv Lavra. The Russian Orthodox Church considers it as "non-canonical". His enthronization took place in Kremenets on 23 April 1923. In response to Metropolitan Dionysius’ request to Patriarch Tikhon of Moscow to bless the independent existence of the Orthodox Church in the Polish state, the Patriarch refused to do this, expressing disagreement with this act and stating, in particular, that only the Local Council of the All-Russian Orthodox Church had the right to make such a decision.

On 13 November 1924 the Ecumenical Patriarch Gregory VII of Constantinople signed the Patriarchal and Synodal Tomos granting autocephaly to the Polish Orthodox Church, and on September 17, 1925, an official ceremony of its proclamation took place in the Warsaw Metropolitan Cathedral of the Holy and Equal-to-the-Apostles Mary Magdalene. In 1927, Metropolitan Dionysius received the title “His Beatitude” from the Ecumenical Patriarch Basil III of Constantinople.

With start of the World War II, in 1939 Metropolitan Dionysius called the Eastern Orthodox citizens of Poland to fight invaders, for which he was placed under a "house arrest" by Gestapo. Following partition of Poland by Nazi Germany and Soviet Union, the Polish Orthodox Church lost most of its territories to the Russian Orthodox Church and few remaining came under administration of the Bishop of Berlin of the Russian Orthodox Church Outside of Russia.

On 23 September 1940, Metropolitan Dionisius signed a loyalty declaration for the General Governor of Poland Hans Frank and was released from his arrest. On 30 September 1940 the Bishop Council of the Polish Orthodox Church led by Metropolitan Dionisius reformed the Church considering the new realities and constituted new dioceses which were 3: Diocese of Warschau and Radom, Diocese of Cholm and Podlachia, Diocese of Krakau and Lemkos.

== Removal ==
On June 13, 1945, Dionizy addressed a memorandum to Bolesław Bierut, in which he once again declared his loyalty to the Polish authorities and informed him of his return to performing his duties as the head of the PAKP. He also claimed that his cooperation with the authorities of the General Government was caused by the need to take care of the religious needs of the Orthodox population by preventing the liquidation of the Church. He also emphasized that many of the actions he took during the war were forced by the Nazis, while he himself did not undertake any additional initiatives for the authorities. His explanations did not contribute to changing the negative attitude of the authorities towards him. On June 22, 1945, the Religious Affairs Department of the Ministry of Public Administration asked the minister to influence the metropolitan to voluntarily resign from the office of the head of the PAKP. It was mentioned that the forcible removal of the clergyman could provoke international protests, and Dionizy's visits to Hans Frank and speeches considered anti-Polish were also recalled. The Metropolitan's case was also considered by the prosecutor's office of the Special Court, but it was suspended[86]. At that time, the authorities contacted the Metropolitan about his possible voluntary resignation. However, Dionysius firmly rejected such a solution. At that time, he also contacted the Moscow Patriarch Patriarch Alexy I, wishing to obtain his blessing for the autocephaly of the Polish Orthodox Church. In 1946, however, he received a letter from him in which Alexy I recognized the autocephaly of 1924 as invalid. He demanded that Dionysius recognize the structure he headed as non-canonical and agree to return to the administrative division of the Orthodox Church in Polish lands from 1918, with all the consequences. Metropolitan Dionysius made efforts to clarify the controversial issues during a personal meeting in Moscow, which was initially planned for October 1946. Ultimately, however, his trip did not take place, and the patriarch – most likely under the influence of Stalinist authorities – broke off correspondence.

Most likely, the final decision regarding the future of Metropolitan Dionysius was made in the autumn of 1946, when Minister of Justice Henryk Świątkowski was visiting Moscow, during which he talked with the chairman of the Council for the Russian Orthodox Church. The fruit of this conversation was the memorandum "The Case of the Orthodox Church in Poland", in which Świątkowski included, among other things, a postulate to organize elections for a new head of the PAKP. The metropolitan managed to establish the Private Study of Orthodox Theology at the Metropolitan Cathedral before he was placed under house arrest on 25 February 1948. By order of the President of Poland, Bolesław Bierut, of 17 April 1948, at the request of the Minister of Public Administration, a "withdrawal of the recognition granted to Dionizy Waledyński as Metropolitan of the Polish Autocephalous Orthodox Church" was issued. The same decision was confirmed by a resolution of the Council of Ministers. The authorities considered the choice of the place of isolation of the hierarch for a long time - they considered Otwock, Łódź, Piotrków Trybunalski and Łagów, where adaptation of the apartment for him had already begun.

Metropolitan Dionizy applied for the restoration of the office granted to him by the canon, writing to the Minister of Public Administration. He also did not receive a response. In August 1948, he also contacted Patriarch Alexy, expressing the expected remorse for "offences against the Church-Motherland". The Synod of the Russian Church then recognized Dionysius as a priest in canonical communion with the mother Church and allowed him, due to his long service, to retain the dignity of metropolitan, but without the title of His Beatitude. A protest against the treatment of the metropolitan was issued by the Patriarch of Constantinople Athenagoras and the Polish government in exile. The metropolitan was under house arrest in Sosnowiec, where he was voluntarily accompanied by Fr. Atanazy Semeniuk and his wife. He occupied a villa from which the previous tenants had been evicted. After May 15, 1958, the authorities allowed him to return to Warsaw after sending another letter indicating the disastrous effect of his stay in Sosnowiec on his health. He died on March 15, 1960 in the parish house at the church of St. John Klimak in Warsaw's Wola district. In accordance with his own wish, he was buried in the Orthodox cemetery in Warsaw's Wola district.
