= Mstyslav Skrypnyk =

Ukrainian Eastern Orthodox bishop

Patriarch Mstyslav (Skrypnyk)
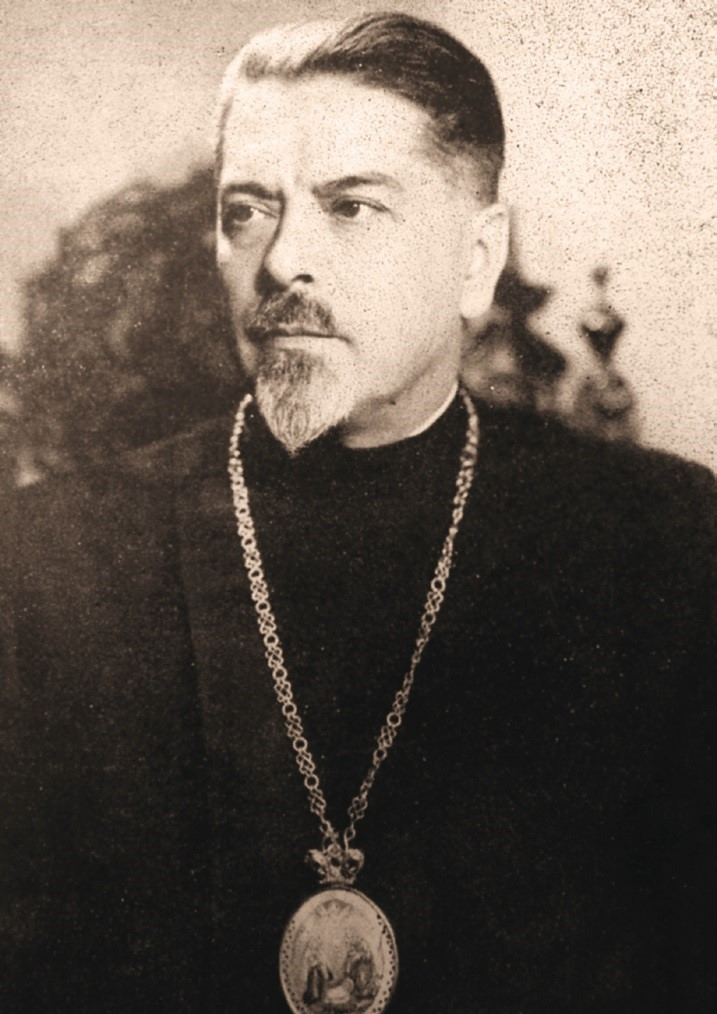

Orders
- Ordination: 14 May 1942

Personal details
- Born: Stepan Ivanovich Skyrpnyk; 10 April 1898 Poltava, Poltava Governorate, Russian Empire
- Died: 11 June 1993 (aged 95) Grimsby, Ontario, Canada
- Buried: South Bound Brook, NJ, USA
- Denomination: Eastern Orthodox

Patriarch Mstyslav, secular name Stepan Ivanovych Skrypnyk (10 April 1898 – 11 June 1993), was a Ukrainian Orthodox Church hierarch. He was a nephew of Symon Petliura.

== Biography ==
Born in Poltava (Russian Empire, now Ukraine), Skrypnyk attended the Poltava First Classical Gymnasium and dreamt of a military career through his youth. During the Great War years he studied at the Officers' school in Orenburg located in the Russian Ural Mountains.

During the Ukrainian–Soviet War Skrypnyk became a diplomatic courier for the army of the Ukrainian People's Republic. He then served a second lieutenant (ensign) for special missions for Petliura.

In the early 1920s he was interned by Poland in an internment camp in Kalisz. Later, he briefly settled in Volhynia but had to leave under the pressure of the Polish authorities. He then moved to Galicia and became an activist for the Ukrainian movement in Poland which controlled the ethnically Ukrainian territories of Galicia and Volhynia between the world wars. Following his attendance of the Warsaw School of Political Sciences, he was elected in 1930 to the Polish Sejm from the Ukrainian population of Volhynia. He also served as vice-mayor of Rivne in the 1930s. In this period Skrypnyk collaborated with the Polish voivode of Volhynia, Henryk Józewski in his Prometheist policies supporting moderate Ukrainians as a counterweight to Soviet communism. Serving in Sejm until 1939 Skrypnyk attained the reputation of the defender of the Ukrainian minority rights in Poland, especially of the Orthodox Faith in the predominantly Orthodox Volhynia against the assimilationist policies of Polish authorities.

At the beginning of the Second World War, the Ukrainian life in some Nazi-occupied territories of Poland initially experienced a significant degree of revival as the Nazi policies played with pitting the ethnic groups with a historically complicated relationship against each other, giving an upper hand to Poles or Ukrainians in different regions as the Nazis saw fit.

When the Ukrainian Committee and the Temporary Church Council was formed in Cholm (Chełm), Skrypnyk was elected a council deputy head (1940). In April 1942 Skrypnyk, by then a widower, entered the priesthood. He took monastic vows in the following month and soon after was ordained (May 14) as the Bishop Mstyslav of Pereiaslav by the Ukrainian Autocephalous Orthodox Church (UAOC). The consecration took place in the Church of St Andrew in Kyiv.

In August 1942, the German occupational authorities banned Mstyslav from Kyiv General-Governorate. As Mstyslav disobeyed the order, he was arrested in Rivne. On Gestapo accusations he spent half a year imprisoned in Chernihiv and Pryluky. He was freed in spring the following year but was ordered not to leave Kyiv and banned from conducting religious services.

In 1944 he moved to Warsaw and later to Germany, where he was the head of the Ukrainian Orthodox eparchies in Hessen and Württemberg. In 1947 he left for Canada where he was elected the first resident hierarch of the Ukrainian Greek Orthodox Church (UGOC) as an archbishop of Winnipeg. He left the UGOC due to conflict about the balance of power between the bishop and church administrators. The focal point of this conflict was between Mstyslav and Fr. Semen Sawchuk, who was the administrator of the UGOC consistory.

In 1949 he moved to the USA and joined the Ukrainian Orthodox Church in America (UOC in America), then headed by Bishop Bohdan (Shpyl'ka). At the 1950 Council (Sobor) in New York City he succeeded in bringing about unification of the UOC in America with the much larger Archdiocese eparchy of Archbishop John (Theodorovich), the Ukrainian Orthodox Church of the USA (UOC of USA). Archbishop John was elected as Metropolitan of the newly united UOC of USA. Archbishop Mstyslav became his deputy and the head of the Consistory. In the US, Bishop Mstyslav began extensive church activity with the Ukrainian Orthodox Center, a publishing house, library and seminary being built in South Bound Brook, New Jersey. After the death of Metropolitan Nikanor (Abramovych) in 1969, his authority was extended over the Ukrainian Autocephalous Orthodox Churches of Europe and Australia. During his meetings with the then Ecumenical Patriarch, Athenagoras I both separately in 1963 and 1971, he brought up the issue of the canonical recognition of the Ukrainian Diaspora churches (UAOC was banned in the USSR, and hence in Soviet Ukraine at that time).

In 1991, at the age of 93, he was elected in absentia as the first Patriarch of Kyiv and all Ukraine of the UAOC. He was enthroned as Patriarch Mstyslav I, on November 6, 1991 in St. Sophia Cathedral in Kyiv.

In June 1992, a unification Sobor was held which united the UAOC with one part of the Ukrainian Orthodox Church (Moscow Patriarchate), then led by Metropolitan Filaret (Denysenko). Patriarch Mstyslav personally signed and affixed his seal to the merger documents, which formed the Ukrainian Orthodox Church of the Kyivan Patriarchate under his leadership, but the status of the new church as well as the overall situation with the Orthodox faith in Ukraine became a subject of the wide controversy (see History of Christianity in Ukraine), which the patriarch was unable to resolve within his lifetime.

Patriarch Mstyslav returned to North America, where on June 11, 1993 he died at his daughter's home in Canada at the age of 95. He was entombed at the Ukrainian Orthodox Church of the USA center in South Bound Brook, New Jersey. The issue of repatriating Mstyslav's relics to Ukraine is occasionally raised but no firm plans for this exist.

After his death, the UOC-KP elected Volodomyr (Romaniuk) as Patriarch, while a portion of the UAOC which had broken from the UAOC after the 1992 union elected Patriarch Dymytriy (Yarema) as a head of a newly formed UAOC.

Preceded by Metropolitan John (Theodorovych) as Acting Primate	Archbishop and Primate of the Ukrainian Greek Orthodox Church of Canada (UOCC); 1947–1949	Succeeded by Metropolitan Ilarion (Ohienko) as Metropolitan of the UOCC
New creation	Patriarch of Kyiv and all Rus-Ukraine; 1991–1993	Succeeded by Patriarch Dymytriy (Yarema) as Ukrainian Autocephalous Orthodox Church
New creation	Patriarch of Kyiv and all Rus-Ukraine; 1991–1993	Succeeded by Patriarch Volodomyr (Romaniuk) as Ukrainian Orthodox Church of the Kyivan Patriarchate
