= Autocephaly of the Orthodox Church of Ukraine =

Process of granting of autocephaly to the Eastern Orthodox church in Ukraine

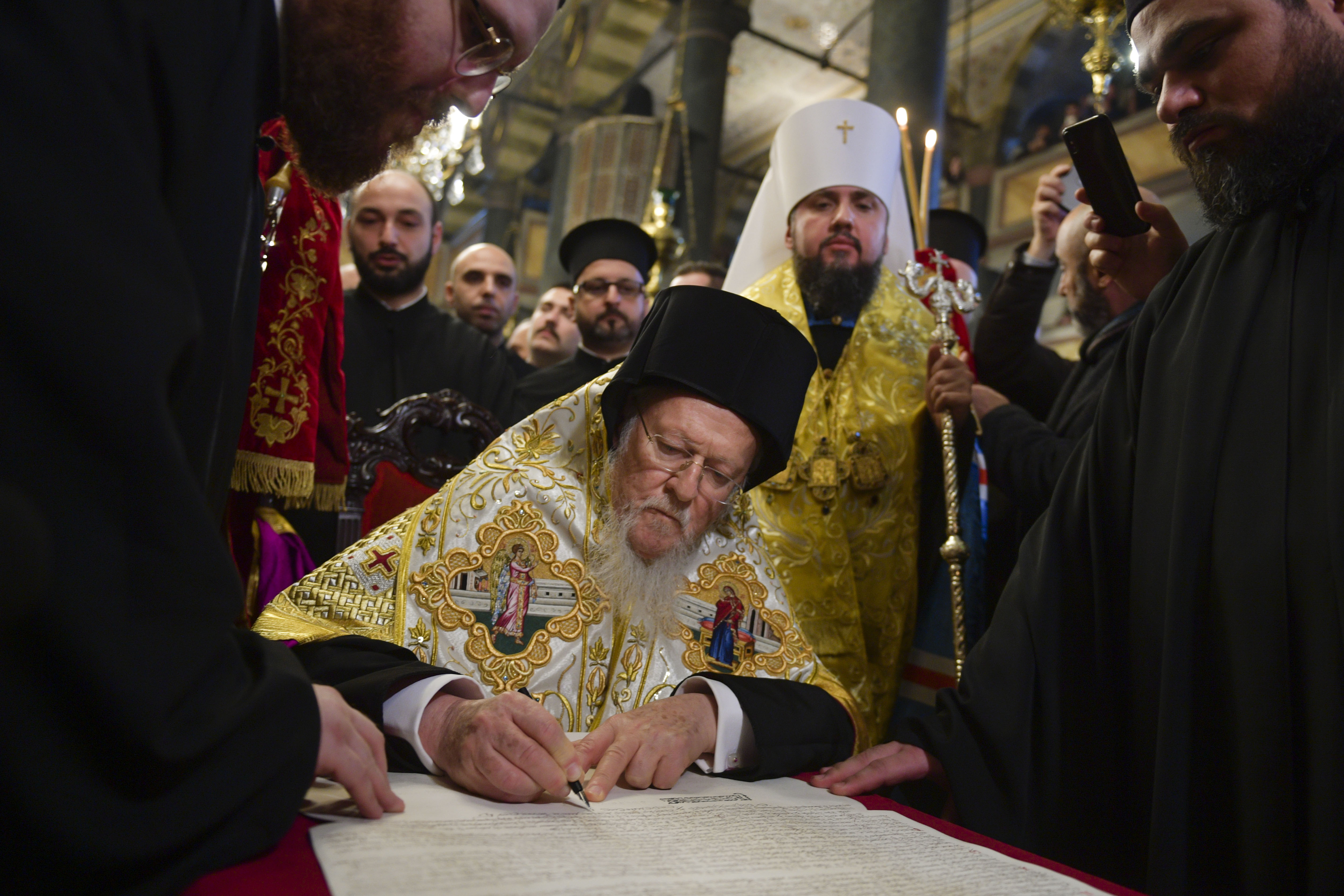
Patriarch Bartholomew signing the tomos of autocephaly of the OCU. Epiphanius of Kyiv (wearing a white klobuk) stands behind him.

On 5 January 2019, Bartholomew I, the Ecumenical Patriarch of Constantinople, signed the tomos that officially recognized and established the Orthodox Church of Ukraine and granted it autocephaly (self-governorship). The events immediately leading to the grant of autocephaly were:

- On 11 October 2018, the synod of the Ecumenical Patriarchate announced that it would "proceed to the granting of autocephaly to the Church of Ukraine", making it independent from the Russian Orthodox Church.
- This decision led the Holy Synod of the Russian Orthodox Church to break communion with the Ecumenical Patriarchate on 15 October 2018, which marked the beginning of the 2018 Moscow–Constantinople schism.
- On 15 December 2018 a unification council founded the Orthodox Church of Ukraine.
- On 5 January 2019, Patriarch Bartholomew signed the tomos of autocephaly of the Orthodox Church of Ukraine.

== Background ==
The Ecumenical Patriarch of Constantinople claims to be the foremost leader and international representative of the Eastern Orthodox Church. The Eastern Orthodox Church is geographically divided into several largely independent local churches, each with its own leader (Patriarch, Archbishop, or Metropolitan).

Shortly after Ukraine gained its independence from the USSR, some of its presidents asked the Ecumenical Patriarchate to give Ukraine a church distinct from the Moscow Patriarchate.

=== Three Eastern Orthodox churches in Ukraine ===
At the end of the 20th century, three Eastern Orthodox jurisdictions existed in Ukraine:

- The Ukrainian Orthodox Church (Moscow Patriarchate) (UOC-MP) which is part of the Russian Orthodox Church and thus under the Moscow Patriarchate. This church was, until 11 October 2018, the only Orthodox church in Ukraine recognized by other Orthodox churches.
- The Ukrainian Autocephalous Orthodox Church (UAOC), led by Metropolitan Makariy, which was independent, having been founded in 1921 following the establishment of the short-lived Ukrainian People's Republic and having survived the Soviet Union both outside and inside the country.
- The Ukrainian Orthodox Church – Kyiv Patriarchate (UOC-KP), led by Patriarch Filaret of Kyiv, an independent church which was founded in July 1992. In January 1992, after Ukraine gained its independence from the Soviet Union following the latter's dissolution, Metropolitan of Kyiv Filaret of the UOC-MP convened an assembly at the Kyiv Pechersk Lavra that adopted a request for autocephaly to the Moscow Patriarch. The Patriarchate of Moscow did not comply and asked Filaret to resign. Filaret did not resign and was suspended on 27 May 1992 by the UOC-MP. The bishops loyal to Metropolitan Filaret and a similar group from the Ukrainian Autocephalous Orthodox Church organized a unifying synod which was held on 25–26 June 1992. The delegates agreed to form a combined church named the Ukrainian Orthodox Church – Kyiv Patriarchate under a patriarch they elected, Mstyslav of the UAOC. Mstyslav never approved the union between the UAOC and the UOC-KP. Filaret was defrocked on 11 July 1992 by the Russian Orthodox Church. After the death of Patriarch Mstyslav in 1993, the UOC-KP church was headed by Patriarch Volodymyr. In July 1995, upon the death of Volodymyr, Filaret was elected head of the UOC-KP by a vote of 160–5. Filaret was anathematized by the Russian Orthodox Church in 1997.

The UAOC and the UOC-KP were not recognized by other Orthodox churches and were considered schismatic. ROC officials stated that the anathematization of Filaret was "recognized by all the Local Orthodox Churches including the Church of Constantinople". The synod of the Ecumenical Patriarchate did indeed recognize, in a July 1992 letter to Patriarch Alexy II, the defrocking of Filaret by the ROC, and the Ecumenical Patriarch recognized the anathemization of Filaret in a letter of April 1997 to Patriarch Alexy II.

On 11 October 2018, the excommunications of the UAOC and the UOC-KP were lifted by the Ecumenical Patriarchate, however the Ecumenical Patriarchate recognized neither the UAOC nor the UOC-KP as legitimate and their leaders were not recognized as primates of their respective churches. As of 15 December 2018, the UAOC and the UOC-KP do not exist anymore and have merged with two metropolitans of the UOC-MP to form the Orthodox Church of Ukraine. The UOC-MP still exists. The UOC-MP has 12,064 active parishes, the UOC-KP had 4,807, and the UAOC had 1,048.

=== Ecumenical Patriarchate and the ecclesiastical situation in Ukraine ===
In April 2014, the Ecumenical Patriarch talked about the ecclesiastical problems in Ukraine during his Palm Sunday sermon and said "[t]he Ecumenical Patriarchate recognizes the difficult challenges facing the blessed Ukrainian people today". In February 2015, the Primate of the Canadian Ukrainian Orthodox Church, Metropolitan Yuri (Kalishchuk), during a round table in the Ukrinform agency, declared that "[t]he Patriarchy [of Constantinople] is watching the situation in Ukraine and considers the ideal solution to get the unified Orthodoxy" and "will work on uniting Orthodoxy in Ukraine". He added that the "Constantinople Patriarchate is waiting for the request and guidance from the Ukrainian Orthodox jurisdictions here, but first of all it is waiting for a step from the President of Ukraine".

On 6 June 2015, the UAOC requested to the Ecumenical Patriarchate to receive "[the] Ukrainian Autocephalous Orthodox Church to the Ecumenical Patriarchate as a metropoliswith [sic] the rights of self-governance". On 24 June, the Holy Synod of the Ukrainian Orthodox Church (Moscow Patriarchate), held on 24 June in Kyiv issued a statement about the presence of "two bishops of the Constantinople Patriarchate in Ukraine [Bishop Daniel of Pamphilon and Bishop Ilarion] and their meeting with Ukrainian clergy". The bishops of the UOC-MP "expressed concern" about [Bishop Daniel of Pamphilon and Bishop Ilarion's] activities in the "canonical territory" of the UOC-MP without consent of the hierarchs of the UOC-MP. On 27 July 2015, the UOC-KP, after its Holy Synod the same day, decided to plan to ask the Ecumenical Patriarch to recognize its autocephalous status.

On 2 February 2016, the Patriarch of Moscow officially declared that "it is important that there is already a common understanding of the need for consensus among all the Churches, excluding any unilateral actions in granting autocephaly." The same day he warned that "the unilateral recognition of the schism [in Ukraine] will unavoidably have [catastrophic consequences] for the unity of the Orthodox Church"; on this occasion, the Ecumenical Patriarch declared: "We all recognize that Metropolitan Onufry is the only canonical head of Orthodoxy in Ukraine."

In June 2016, the 2016 Pan-Orthodox Council was held in Crete. However, a few days before it began, the Russian Orthodox Church refused to participate. Previously the Orthodox churches of Georgia, Bulgaria, and Antioch had also refused to participate. One of the issues cited was the method of proclaiming the autonomy of the Orthodox churches. On 16 June, Ukraine's parliament, the Verkhovna Rada, asked Ecumenical Patriarch Bartholomew I of Constantinople for autocephaly for the Orthodox Church of Ukraine and thus independence from the Russian Orthodox Church. On 11 June, before the adoption of the resolution by the Rada, the Moscow Patriarchate sharply criticized the appeal of the deputies. However, the council in Crete did not consider and did not officially comment on the Ukrainian question.

On 15 December 2017, Filaret in Kyiv met with personal representatives of the Patriarchate of Constantinople: Daniel of Pamphilon (UOC of USA) and Bishop Hilarion (UOC of Canada) and discussed with them issues "of mutual interest".

=== Situation of the UOC-MP since 2014 ===
Since the regime change initiated by the overthrow of President Yanukovych in 2014, President Poroshenko and the Ukrainian parliament have expressed serious concerns about the ‘ambiguous’ stance or silence of the leaders of the Russian Orthodox Church and the Ukrainian Orthodox Church (Moscow Patriarchate) regarding crucial national security issues.

They failed to support the Maidan Revolution of Dignity, aiming, among other things, to thwart Moscow's influence and interference in Ukraine's internal affairs. They failed to condemn Russia's annexation of Crimea and the eradication of the Ukrainian Orthodox Church/ Kyiv Patriarchate parishes in the peninsula.

They failed to condemn the Moscow-sponsored separatist war in Donbas. The result was that they were perceived as Trojan horses following the political agenda and interests of Moscow.

— Willy Fautré

== Process of granting autocephaly to the Orthodox church in Ukraine ==
=== June 2016 request of autocephaly ===
On 16 June 2016, the Ukrainian parliament passed a resolution to appeal to the Ecumenical Patriarch "to recognize invalid the act in 1686 as the one adopted in violation of the sacred canons of the Orthodox Church", "to take an active part in overcoming the church schism by convening Ukrainian unification council under the auspices of the Ecumenical Patriarchate, which would solve all controversial issues and unite the Ukrainian Orthodox Church", and to grant autocephaly to the Orthodox church in Ukraine. On the same day, the Russian Orthodox Church protested fiercely against this resolution. On 19 July, the Ecumenical Patriarchate said it would create a synodal commission to "examine" the Ukrainian parliament's request to grant autocephaly to Ukraine. On 1 August 2016, Archbishop Job of Telmissos of the Ecumenical Patriarchate declared in an interview given to the Religion Information Service of Ukraine that "Constantinople has always believed that the territory of Ukraine is the canonical territory of the Church of Constantinople."

=== April 2018 request of autocephaly ===
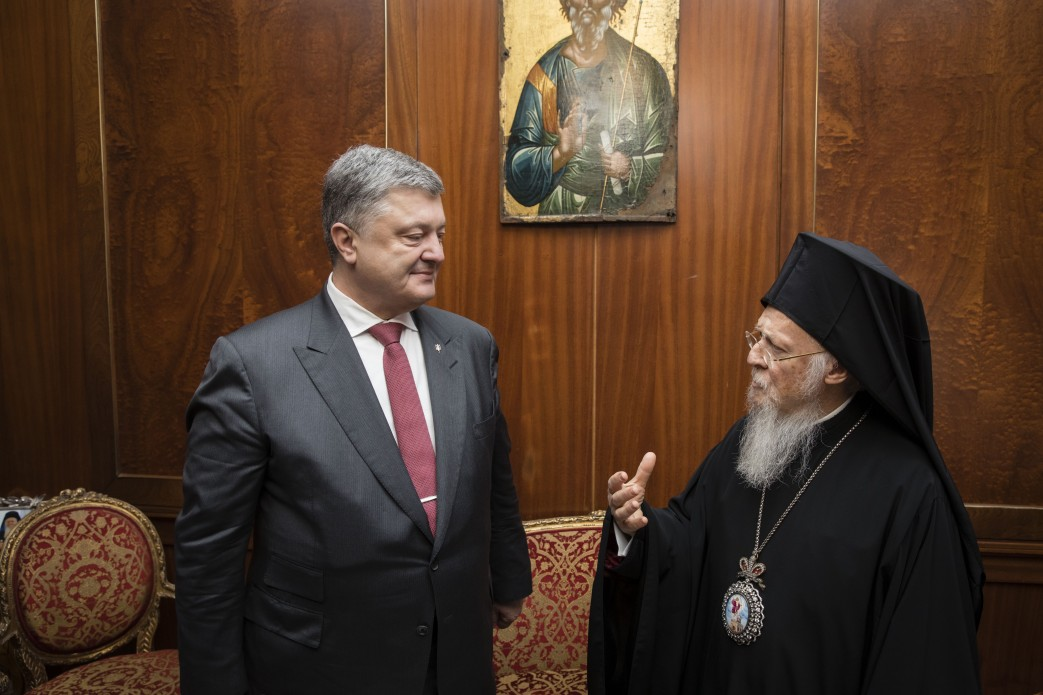
Meeting of Poroshenko with the Ecumenical Patriarch Bartholomew I, 9 April 2018

On 9 April 2018, Ukrainian President Petro Poroshenko had a meeting in Istanbul with the Ecumenical Patriarch during which Poroshenko "noted the importance of the introduction of a Single Local Orthodox Church in Ukraine aspired by the Ukrainian people". At that time, an article published on the pro-Moscow anonymous website Union of Orthodox Journalists declared that no relevant progress concerning the question of a local Orthodox church for Ukraine had been made.

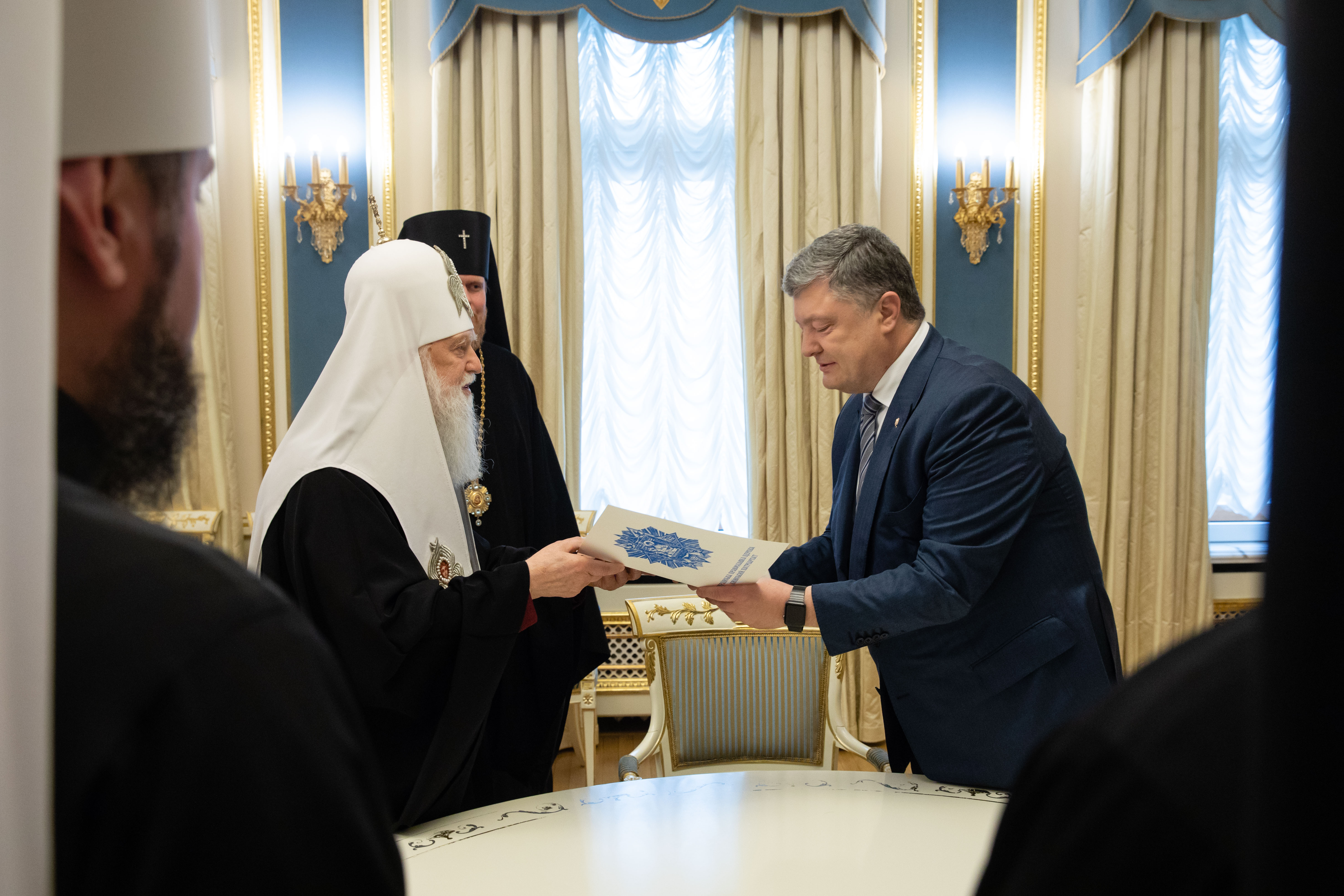
Ukrainian President Petro Poroshenko and Filaret, 16 April 2018

On 17 April, Ukrainian President Poroshenko met in Turkey with the Ecumenical Patriarch and made an appeal, supported by various Ukrainian MPs, for the granting of autocephaly to Ukraine; both parties reached an agreement after a 7-hour long negotiation. The full appeal was later published on the official website of the president of Ukraine. The UOC-KP and the UAOC also sent a similar appeal to the Ecumenical Patriarchate in what Poroshenko described as "a rare united move of the two churches [the UOC-KP and the UAOC]". On 18 April, the draft resolution on the support of Poroshenko's appeal was submitted to the Ukrainian parliament, and on 19 April it was adopted. The text of the appeal of the Ukrainian parliament was longer and contained more arguments in favor of Ukraine's autocephaly compared to Poroshenko's appeal. (Note: The appeal of the parliament can be found here.) On 20 April, the official request to issue a Tomos of Autocephaly was delivered to the Ecumenical Patriarchate. On the same day, 20 April, the Holy synod of the Ecumenical Patriarchate "voted to proceed with taking the necessary steps for granting autocephaly to the Orthodox Christians of Ukraine". On 22 April, the Ecumenical Patriarchate issued an official communiqué declaring that the synod had "examined matters pertaining to the ecclesiastical situation in Ukraine, as done in previous synodal sessions, and having received from ecclesiastical and civil authorities [...] a petition that requests the bestowal of autocephaly, decided to closely communicate and coordinate with its sister Orthodox Churches concerning this matter." The same day, President Poroshenko declared on his official Facebook page that "the Ecumenical Patriarchate had commenced the procedures necessary for granting autocephaly to the Ukrainian Orthodox Church." The agreement assigned the property of Ukrainian churches and monasteries to the autocephalous Ukrainian Orthodox Church.

On 23 June 2018, a delegation of the UOC-MP held talks with Patriarch Bartholomew and other members of the hierarchy of the Ecumenical Patriarchate. The negotiations ended up with neither signed documents nor a joint statement. The goal of these talks were, according to the UOC-MP, "for the purpose of obtaining reliable information from Patriarch Bartholomew himself regarding initiatives for the possible granting of a Tomos for Autocephaly, as well as for the purpose of communicating the position of the Ukrainian Orthodox Church on this issue. The hierarchs also informed the patriarch about the current situation of church life in Ukraine."

On 25 June, the UOC-MP declared it had "heard the message" of Metropolitan Onufry and the permanent members of the Holy Synod of the Ukrainian Orthodox Church (MP) on the meeting that took place on 23 June in Istanbul between the delegation of the UOC-MP and the Ecumenical Patriarch Bartholomew and members of the Holy Synod of the Ecumenical Patriarchate. Therefore the hierarchs of the UOC-MP adopted a joint statement in which they "expressed their vision for the further development of the mission of the Ukrainian Orthodox Church in Ukrainian society". The statement concludes that "[t]he current canonical status is quite sufficient for the Ukrainian Orthodox Church to fruitfully carry out its mission among the people of Ukraine".

On 31 August 2018, Ecumenical Patriarch Bartholomew met with Patriarch Kirill of Moscow to discuss Ukrainian autocephaly, informing him that they "are implementing already this decision" to grant autocephaly.

On 1 September, in Istanbul, a Synaxis of Hierarchs of the Ecumenical Throne began. Patriarch Bartholomew delivered the keynote address to over 100 Hierarchs of the Throne, stating, among other things: "the origin of difficulties and reactions in Ukraine are neither a recent phenomenon nor something created by the Ecumenical Patriarchate. Already from the early 14th century, when the See of the Kyivan Metropolis was moved without the canonical permission of the Mother Church to Moscow, there have been tireless efforts on the part of our Kyivan brothers for independence from ecclesiastical control by the Moscow center. [...] The Tome proclaiming Moscow as a Patriarchate does not include the region of today's Metropolis of Kyiv in the jurisdiction of Moscow. Moreover, [...] the canonical dependence of Kyiv to the Mother Church of Constantinople remained constant and uninterrupted. [...] [S]ince Russia, as the one responsible for the current painful situation in Ukraine, is unable to solve the problem, the Ecumenical Patriarchate assumed the initiative of resolving the problem in accordance with the authority afforded to it by the Sacred Canons and the jurisdictional responsibility over the eparchy of Kyiv, receiving a request to this end by the honorable Ukrainian Government, as well as recurring requests by "Patriarch" Philaret of Kyiv appealing for our adjudication of his case."

On 12 December 2018, 47 Ukrainian MPs, most of them from the Opposition Bloc, had asked the Constitutional Court of Ukraine "to recognize as contradicting the Constitution the Rada's decision supporting the tomos, which they believe violates the principle of separation of state and church". However, on 12 March 2019, the Constitutional Court of Ukraine declined to initiate the case and justified itself saying the issues addressed in the Ukrainian parliament's decision "cannot be considered by the Constitutional Court as they are political, not legal in nature." On 25 April 2019, the Constitutional Court of Ukraine considered the case of religious organizations that wanted to repeal the same 19 April 2018 appeal of the parliament. The Constitutional Court rejected their claim, saying the court had "concluded that it does not have any evidence of administrative jurisdiction."

=== Ecumenical Patriarch's legates in Ukraine and reactions of the Russian Orthodox Church ===
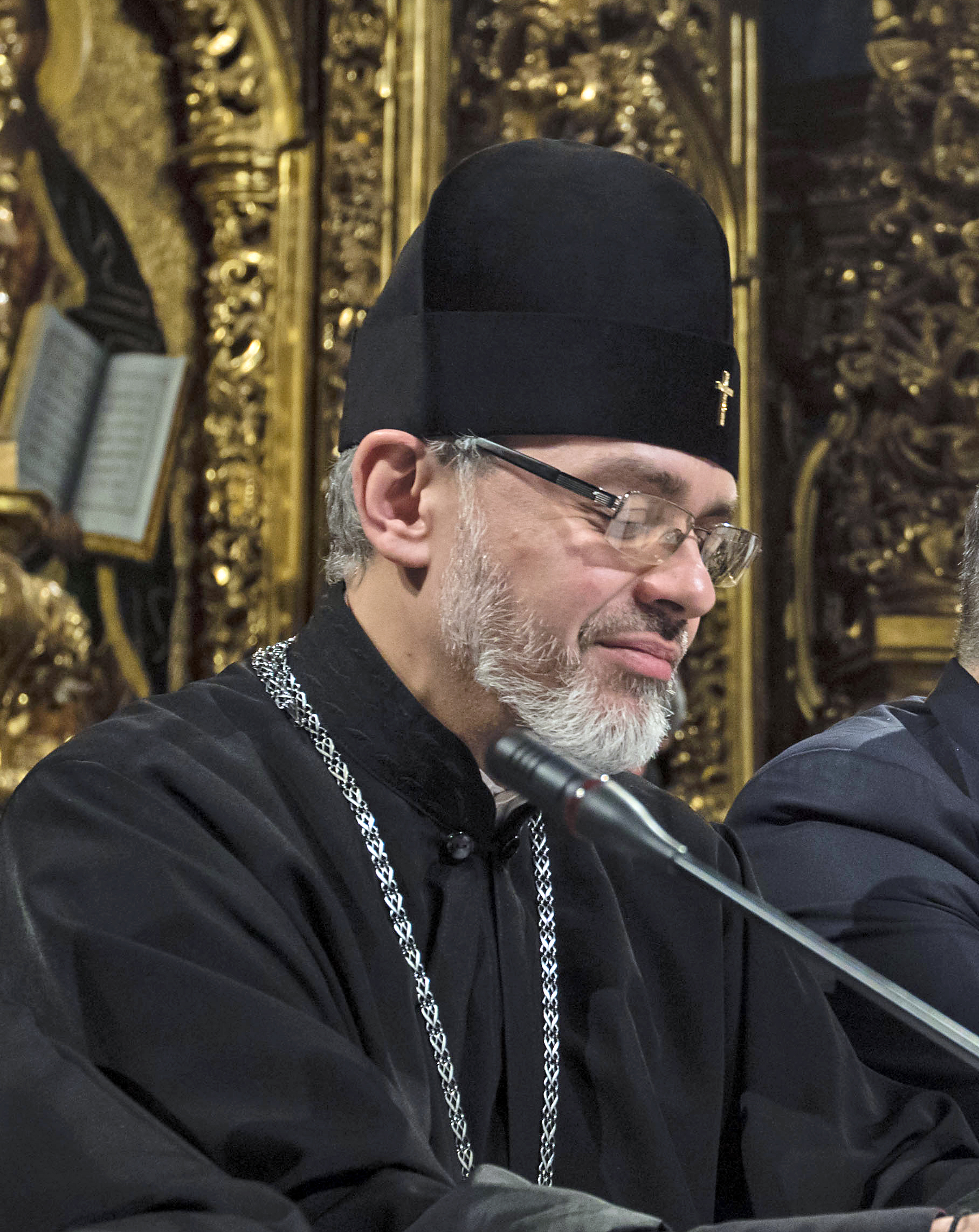
Daniel (Zelinsky) of Pamphilon

On 7 September, the Patriarch of Constantinople announced, on the official websites of the Ecumenical Patriarch Permanent Delegation to the World Council of Churches as well as on the official website of the Ecumentical Patriarchate, that he had appointed Archbishop Daniel (Zelinsky) of Pamphilon and Bishop Hilarion (Rudnyk) as his exarchs and legates in Ukraine. Those appointments were, according to the official announcement on the official website of the Ecumenical Patriarchate, "[w]ithin the framework of the preparations for the granting of autocephaly to the Orthodox Church in Ukraine". Daniel of Pamphlion and Hilarion had already been sent by the Ecumenical Patriarchate to Ukraine in 2015 which at the time led to an official protest by the UOC-MP.

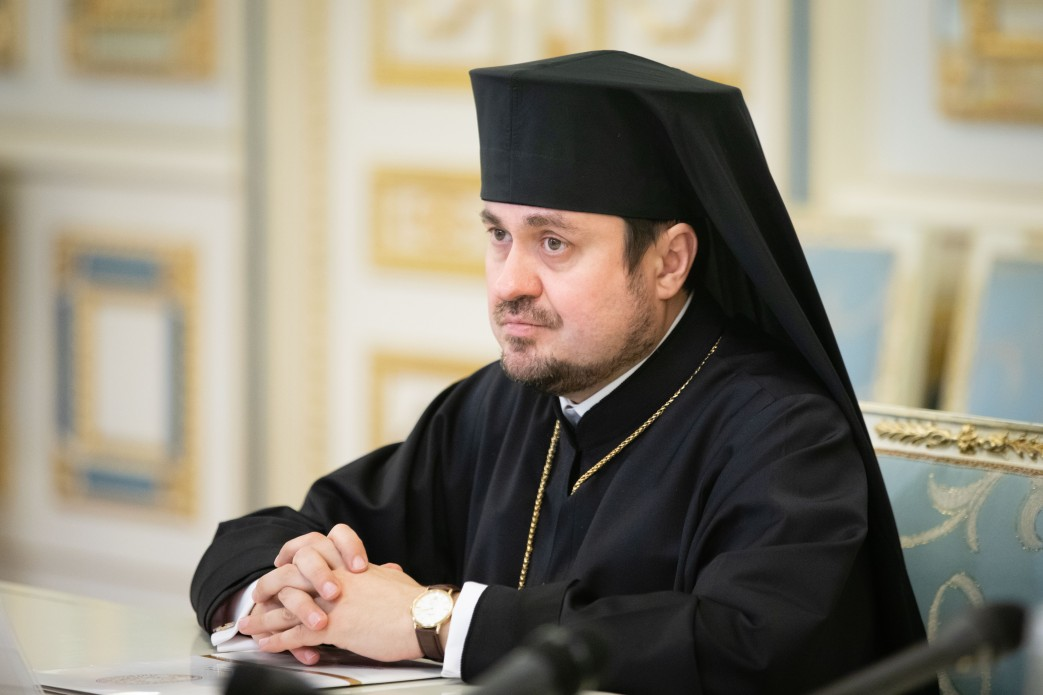
Hilarion (Rudnyk)

The same day, the chairman of the Moscow Patriarchate's Department for External Church Relations, Metropolitan Hilarion, gave an interview to Russia 24 TV channel about the appointment of the two exarchs. In this interview, Hilarion issued his warning that the Russian Orthodox Church will "have no other choice but to break the communion" with the Ecumenical Patriarch if autocephaly is granted to Ukraine. This interview was entirely published on the Moscow Patriarchate's Department for External Church Relations's official website in English the next day.

On 8 September, the synod of the Russian Orthodox Church expressed its "resolute protest against and deep indignation at" the report published a day prior on the appointment of the two hierarchs of the Ecumenical Patriarchate as exarchs of the Patriarchate for Kyiv. The same day, on a social network, Vladimir Legoyda, head of the Synodal Department for Church, Society and Media Relations of the Russian Orthodox Church, commented on the topic and stated that "[t]he appointment by the Patriarch of Constantinople of his episcopal representatives in Ukraine, without agreement with the Patriarch of Moscow [...] and His Beatitude [the] Metropolitan of Kiev [...], is [...] an unprecedentedly gross incursion into the Moscow Patriarchate's canonical territory[.] [...] These actions cannot be left unanswered". The same day, the UOC-MP published an official declaration on its website which states: "[T]he appointment of the two Exarchs is a gross violation of the canonical territory of the Ukrainian Orthodox Church. The decision made by the Constantinopolitan Patriarchate contradicts the 2nd Canon of the Second Ecumenical Council (Constantinople), namely that, without being invited, "Bishops must not leave their own diocese and go over to churches beyond its boundaries"."

=== September 2018: Russian Orthodox synod's "retaliatory measures" and the aftermath ===
Current status of the 2018 schism by Orthodox Church jurisdiction. Recognises OCU autocephaly Concelebrated with or commemorated OCU primate in Divine Liturgy diptych No definitive statements yet on OCU Does not recognise OCU autocephaly Territorial disputes between Moscow Patriarchate (MP) and Ecumenical Patriarchate of Constantinople or Romanian Orthodox Church.

On 14 September 2018, in response to the appointment of those two exarchs, the Russian Orthodox Church decided to hold "an extraordinary session" to take "retaliatory measures after the appointment by the Patriarchate of Constantinople of its "exarchs" to Kyiv following up the decision of this Church's Synod "to grant autocephalous status to the Orthodox Church in Ukraine."" The synod of the Russian Orthodox Church decided:

1. To suspend the liturgical prayerful commemoration of Patriarch Bartholomew of Constantinople.

2. To suspend concelebration with hierarchs of the Patriarchate of Constantinople.

3. To suspend the participation of the Russian Orthodox Church in all Episcopal Assemblies, theological dialogues, multilateral commissions and other structures chaired or co-chaired by representatives of the Patriarchate of Constantinople.

4. To adopt a statement of the Holy Synod concerning the uncanonical actions of the Patriarchate of Constantinople in Ukraine.

A statement was released the same day explaining the situation and the sanctions taken to protest against the Ecumenical Patriarch's behavior. On the same day, Metropolitan Hilarion clarified the situation in an interview published on the official website of the Moscow Patriarchate's Department for External Church Relations. In the interview, Hilarion stated:

"[S]uspended will be the [...] participation in all the structures chaired or co-chaired by representatives of Constantinople. [...] The suspension includes bishop's assemblies in the countries of the so-called diaspora and the theological dialogue[.] [...] The decision of the Holy Synod to suspend the liturgical mention of the Patriarch of Constantinople's name during the liturgy and the fact that we suspend con-celebration with hierarchs of the Patriarchate of Constantinople does not imply a full breaking-off of the Eucharistic communion. The lay people who come to Mount Athos or find themselves in churches of the Patriarchate of Constantinople can take communion in them. But we refuse to concelebrate with hierarchs of the Patriarchate of Constantinople since every time they mention the name of their Patriarch during the liturgy while we have suspended it. [...] We do not think, of course, that all this will finally shut the door for dialogue, but our today's decision is a signal to the Patriarchate of Constantinople that if the actions of this kind continue, we will have to break the Eucharistic communion entirely. [...] [A]fter the breaking-off of the Eucharistic communion, at least a half of this 300-million-strong population will no longer recognize him as even the first among equals."

On 23 September 2018 Patriarch Bartholomew, during a Divine Liturgy he was celebrating in the Saint Fokas Orthodox church declared that he "had sent a message that Ukraine would receive autocephaly as soon as possible, since it is entitled to it".

=== 11 October 2018 communiqué of the synod of the Ecumenical Patriarchate ===
On 11 October 2018, after a regular synod, the Patriarchate of Constantinople renewed an earlier decision to move towards granting autocephaly to the Ukrainian Orthodox Church. The synod also withdrew Constantinople's 332-years-old qualified acceptance of the Russian Orthodox Church's canonical jurisdiction over the Ukrainian Church contained in a letter of 1686. The synod also lifted the excommunication of Patriarch Filaret of the Ukrainian Orthodox Church – Kyiv Patriarchate (UOC-KP) and Metropolitan Makariy of the Ukrainian Autocephalous Orthodox Church (UAOC), and both bishops were "canonically reinstated to their hierarchical or priestly rank, and their faithful [...] restored to communion with the Church".

On the evening of 11 October, the day of the declaration of the Patriarch of Constantinople, Ukraine's president Poroshenko enthusiastically welcomed Constantinople's move, which Poroshenko, prematurely and therefore erroneously, described as the granting of a Tomos of autocephaly (a formal decree of church independence) to the Ukrainian Church. He presented Ukrainian Church independence as part of Ukraine's wider conflict with Russia that involves Russia's 2014 annexation of the Crimea, Russia's military intervention in Ukraine, and Ukraine's desire to integrate with the West by joining the European Union and NATO (which is a perception broadly shared by both sides in the dispute).

On 12 October 2018, the day after the Ecumenical Patriarch's decision, according to the Kremlin website, Russian President Vladimir Putin "held an operational meeting with the permanent members of the Security Council" (the Security Council of Russia) that "discussed issues of the domestic Russian socio-economic agenda and international issues". Ukraine's Euromaidan Press described this as Putin convening "an extraordinary meeting of the National Security and Defense Council, where the "situation of the Russian Orthodox Church in Ukraine" was "discussed", and it added that "This is a revealing slip of the tongue, since to assuage Ukrainians, the UOC-MP has been insisting it is independent of Moscow and in no way the "Russian Church in Ukraine."" Similar accounts were given by the Religious Information Service of Ukraine, quoting Interfax-Religion, Putin's press secretary Dmitry Peskov, and the Kremlin website.

On 12 October 2018, the UOC-KP declared in a communiqué that this decision from the Ecumenical Patriarchate had restored the canonical recognition of the episcopate and clergy of the Kyiv Patriarchate. However, it was later clarified that Filaret was considered by the Ecumenical Patriarchate only as "the former metropolitan of Kyiv", and Makariy as "the former Archbishop of Lviv" and, on 2 November 2018, that the Ecumenical Patriarchate did not recognize either the UAOC nor the UOC-KP as legitimate and that their respective leaders were not recognized as primates of their churches. However, the Ecumenical Patriarchate declared that it recognized the sacraments performed by the UOC-KP and the UAOC as valid. The synod was viewed as a key step towards those two organizations merging into a single church independent from Moscow. The Russian Orthodox Church is linked to 12,000 parishes in Ukraine while the Kyiv Patriarchate and UAOC control about 6,000; however, it is believed that many of the Russian-controlled Ukrainian parishes may defect to the Kyiv organizations.

=== Break of communion by the Russian Orthodox Church ===
On 15 October 2018, the Russian Orthodox Church broke communion with the Patriarchate of Constantinople because of the Ecumenical Patriarchate's 11 October 2018 decision.

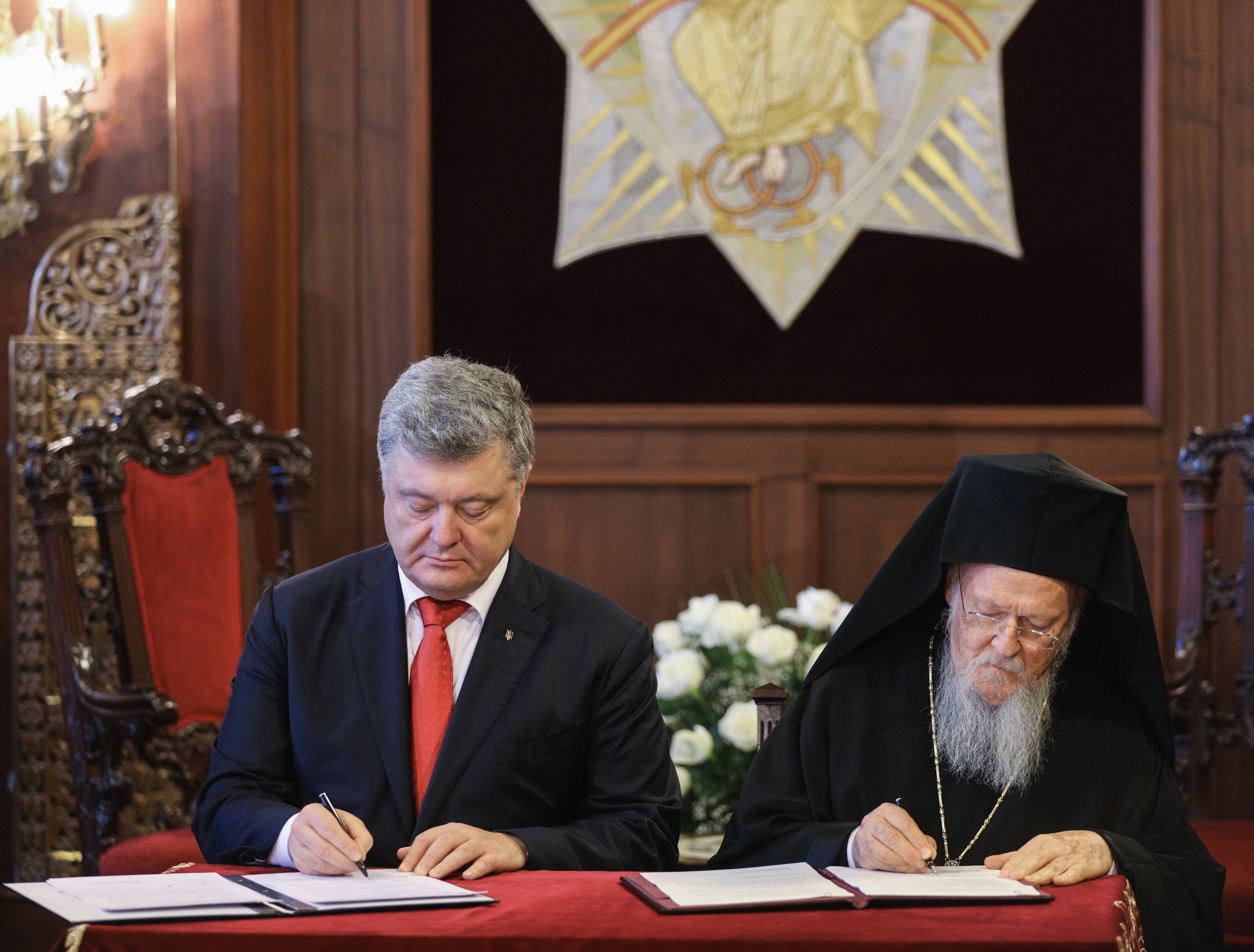
Bartholomew I of Constantinople with Ukrainian President Poroshenko, signing the cooperation agreement, 3 November 2018

In an interview given to the BBC on 2 November 2018, Archbishop Job, hierarch of the Church of Constantinople, explained that since the Ecumenical Patriarchate abolished the decision of the 1686 letter on 11 October 2018, the UOC-MP canonically ceased to exist in Ukraine on 11 October 2018. He added that canonically there could be only one church on the territory of Ukraine and that therefore an exarchate of the Russian Orthodox Church in Ukraine was "simply uncanonical" and that in Ukraine "there can be no repetition of Estonia's scenario". He also explained that the Ecumenical Patriarchate's decision was urged by the reaction of the Ukrainian Orthodox faithful, who wanted to stay Orthodox but did not want to be part of the UOC-MP, following the annexation of Crimea by the Russian Federation and the war in Donbas.

On 3 November 2018, Ukrainian President Poroshenko, during a visit to Turkey, signed a cooperation agreement with the Ecumenical Patriarch Bartholomew. According to Poroshenko, this agreement "creates all the conditions for the preparation process for a unification assembly and the process of providing a tomos to be brought into clear correspondence with the canons of the Orthodox Church". This agreement led to protests by hierarchs of the UOC-MP and the ROC. The text of the agreement was later released on 12 March 2019.

=== 29 November 2018 communiqué of the synod of the Ecumenical Patriarchate ===
The regular November session of the synod of the Ecumenical Patriarchate started on 27 November and ended on 29 November, lasting three days.

On 27 November the Ecumenical Patriarchate decided unanimously to dissolve its exarchate of the Archdiocese of Russian Orthodox churches in Western Europe (AROCWE).

The communiqué says the Ecumenical Patriarchate "decided to revoke the patriarchal tomos of 1999 by which it granted pastoral care and administration of orthodox parishes of Russian tradition in Western Europe to His Archbishop-Exarch. [...] Today's decision aims to further strengthen the link of Russian tradition parishes with the mother church of the patriarchate of Constantinople. [...] It is by pastoral concern that the ecumenical patriarchate has decided to integrate and connect parishes to the various holy Metropolises of the ecumenical patriarchate in the countries where they are located. Our Mother Church will continue to ensure and guarantee the preservation of their liturgical and spiritual tradition."

On 29 November, the synod ended. Some like the Religious Information Service of Ukraine had expected the Ecumenical Patriarchate to give the date of the unification council of the Orthodox Church of Ukraine. However, no date was given.

After the end of its synod, the Ecumenical Patriarchate later released, on its official website, an official communiqué. In said communiqué, the Ecumenical Patriarchate announced: 1) that the synod of the Ecumenical Patriarchate had decided to dissolve the AROCWE, "thereby entrusting its faithful to the Hierarchs of the Ecumenical Throne in Europe", 2) that, in anticipation of the granting of the Tomos of autocephaly to the Orthodox church of Ukraine, the synod of the Ecumenical Patriarchate had "drafted the Ukrainian Church's Constitutional Charter". On the same day, President Poroshenko said in an official speech to the Ukrainian nation that the date for the unification council for the Ukrainian church would be announced "soon" by the Ecumenical Patriarch.

=== Unification council ===
On 15 December 2018, members of the existing Ukrainian Orthodox churches (the UOC-KP, the UAOC and parts of the UOC-MP) voted through their representatives (bishops) to unite into the Orthodox Church of Ukraine on the basis of complete canonical independence. They elected their primate, Epiphanius, and adopted a charter for the Orthodox Church of Ukraine.

=== Formation of the Orthodox Church of Ukraine and election of Metropolitan Epiphany ===
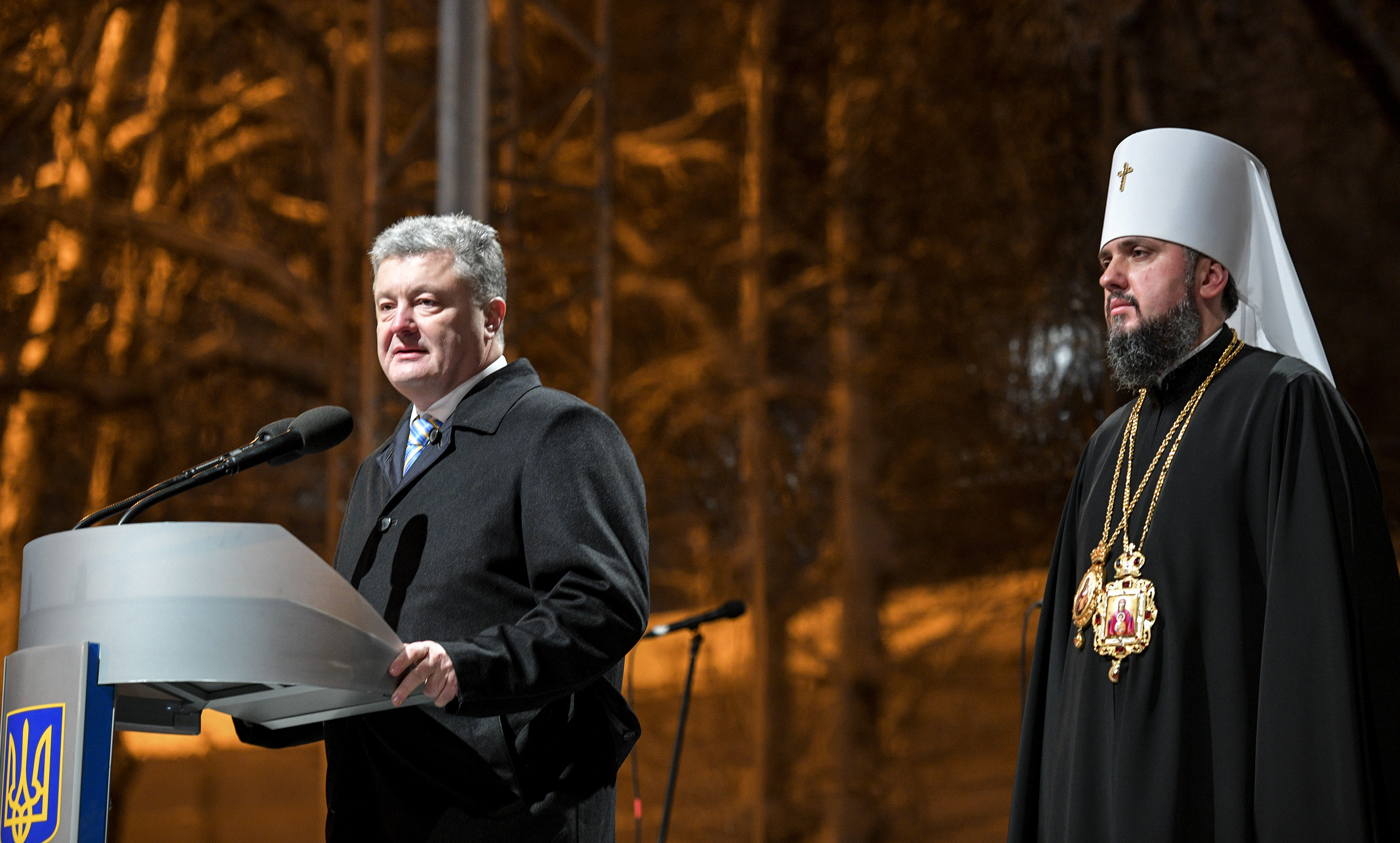
Metropolitan Epiphanius and Ukrainian President Poroshenko, right after the unification council

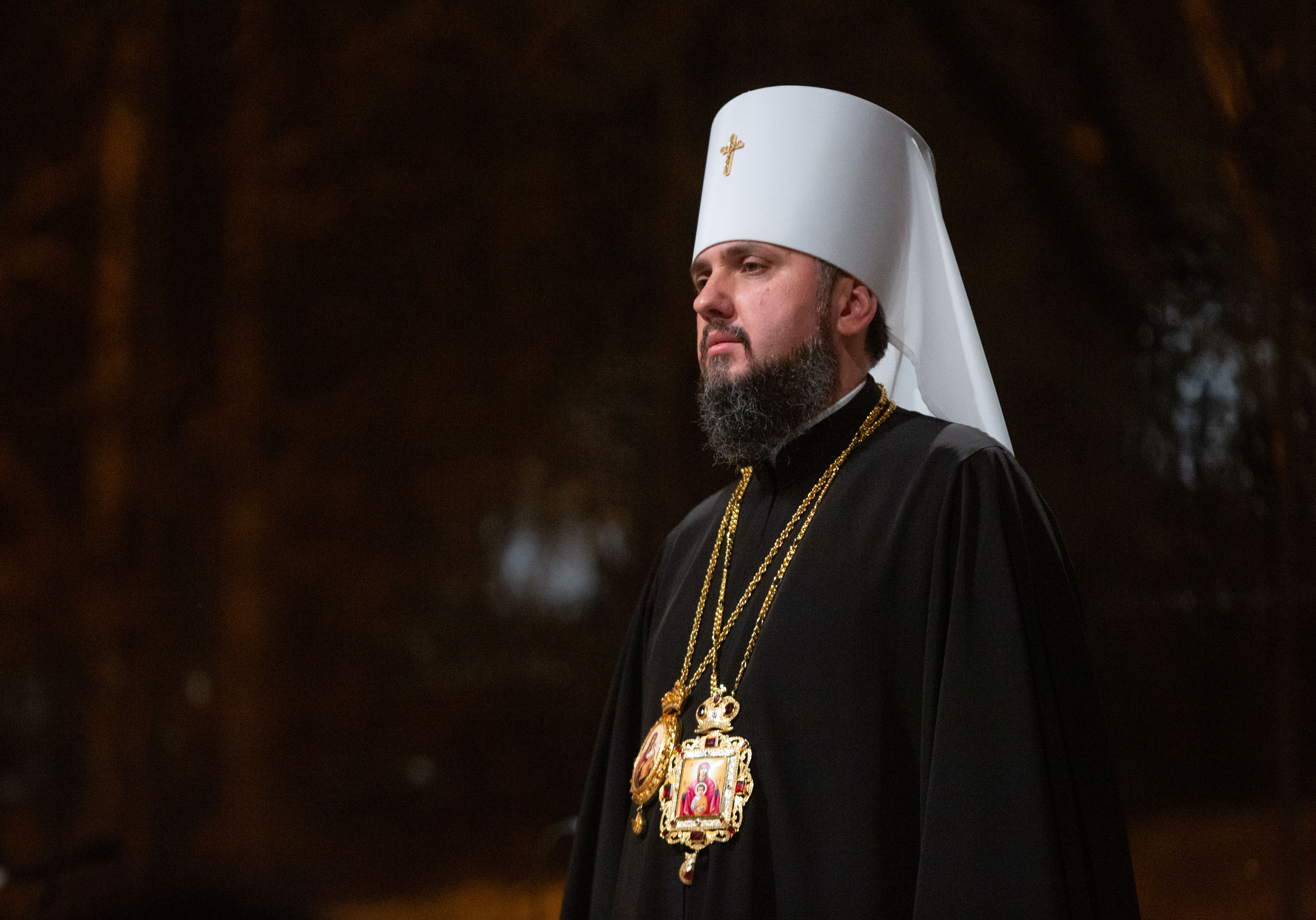
Newly elected Metropolitan Epiphany of Kyiv and all Ukraine

Metropolitan Epiphany of the UOC-KP, who had been chosen on 13 December by the UOC-KP as its only candidate for the unification council between the UOC-KP, the UAOC and the UOC-MP, and was considered as Filaret's right arm, was elected Metropolitan of Ukraine by the unification council on 15 December 2018 after the second round of voting. The unification council also adopted a charter for the newly formed church (Orthodox Church of Ukraine).

In his speech to the faithful after the election, Metropolitan Epiphany thanked President Poroshenko, the Ecumenical Patriarch, Makariy, and the Ukrainian Parliament, as well as Filaret. On Filaret, Epiphany said: "I want to express my gratitude to His Holiness, His Holiness Patriarch Filaret, who is our spiritual mentor and will continue to be honored, helping us, for a lifetime, to jointly build our Single Local Orthodox Church. Thank you, Your Holiness." Epiphany added the doors of his church were "open to everyone".

Epiphany later precised that no weighty decision would be taken by his church as long as he had not received the church's tomos. The Ecumenical Patriarch congratulated and blessed the newly elected Metropolitan on the day of his election and said the newly elected primate was invited to come to Istanbul to celebrate a Liturgy with the Ecumenical Patriarch and receive the Orthodox Church of Ukraine's tomos on 6 January 2019.

Poroshenko also made a speech after Epiphany's election, in which he said the autocephalous church would be "without Putin, without Kirill", but "with God and with Ukraine". He added autocephaly was "part of our state pro-European and pro-Ukrainian strategy". Poroshenko also confirmed his plan to go to Istanbul with the now elected primate of the autocephalous Ukrainian church, on 6 January 2019, to be present when said primate will receive the church's tomos.

On 1 January 2019, Patriarch Bartholomew confirmed his intention to grant the tomos of autocephaly to Metropolitan Epiphany on 6 January 2019, the day of Christmas Eve according to the old Julian Calendar.

== Tomos of autocephaly ==
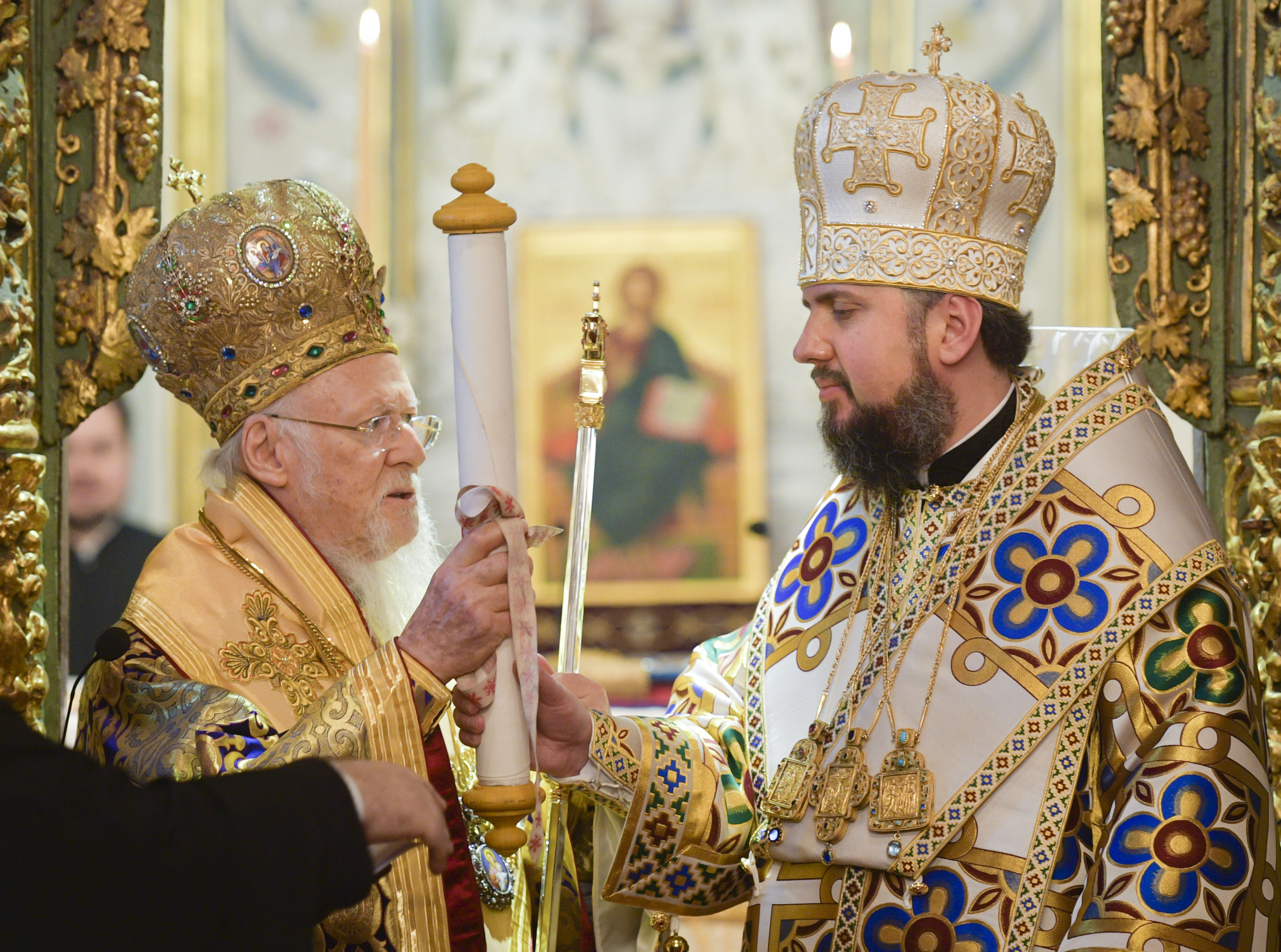
Ecumenical Patriarch Bartholomew (left) handing the tomos of autocephaly to Metropolitan Epiphanius (right)

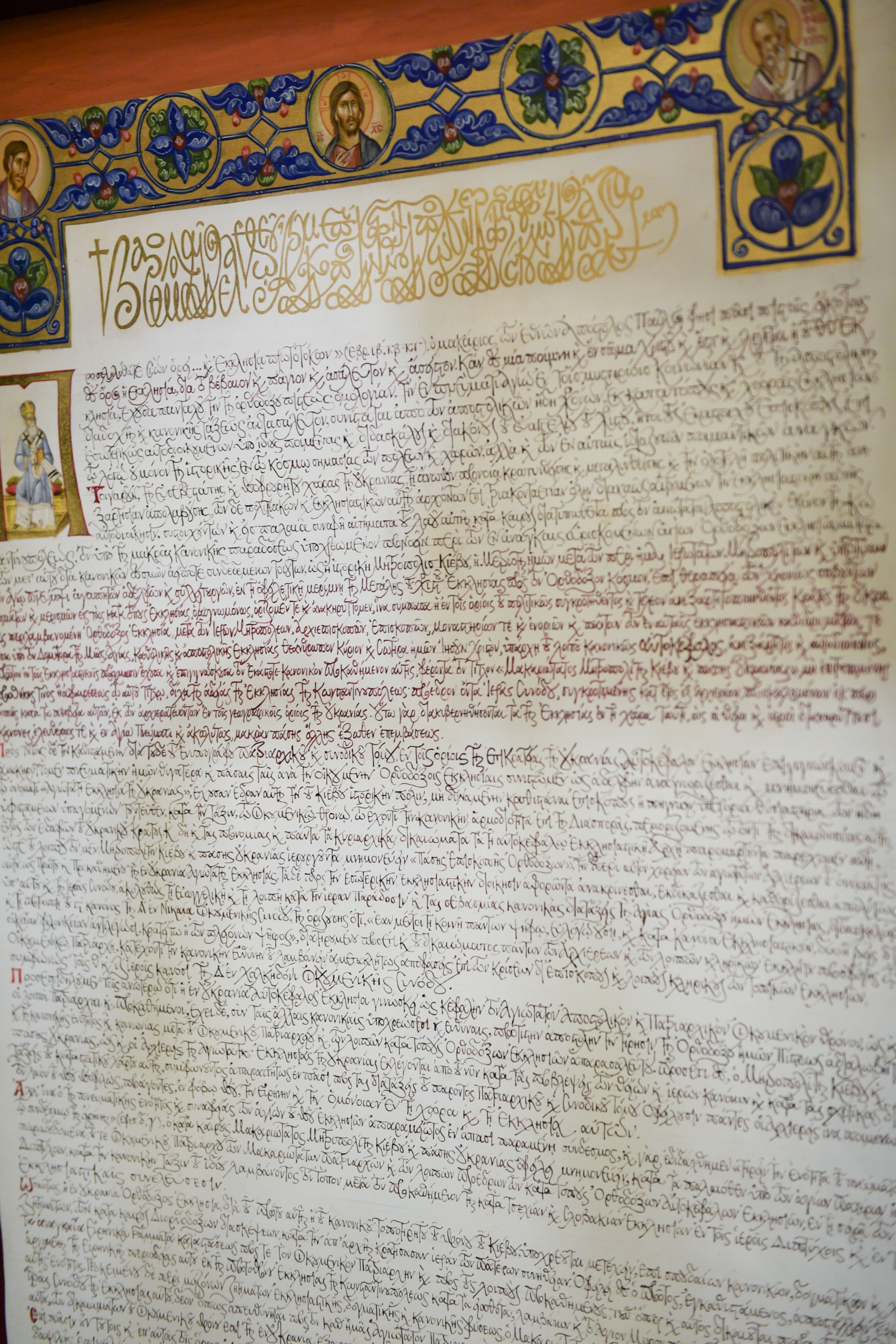
The Tomos of autocephaly

On 5 January 2019, Patriarch Bartholomew and Metropolitan Epiphanius celebrated a Divine Liturgy in St. George's Cathedral in Istanbul; the tomos was signed thereafter, also in St. George's Cathedral.

The tomos "has come into force from the moment of its signing". The signing of the tomos officially established the autocephalous Orthodox Church of Ukraine. President Poroshenko traveled to Istanbul to attend the signing ceremony.

After the tomos was signed, Patriarch Batholomew made an address to Metropolitan Epiphanius. President Poroshenko and Metropolitan Epiphanius also made speeches. On 6 January, after a Liturgy celebrated by Metropolitan Epiphanius and Patriarch Bartholomew, Patriarch Bartholomew read the tomos of the OCU and then gave it to Metropolitan Epiphanius. President Poroshenko was present during the signing and handing over of the tomos.

On 6 January 2019, Daniel (Zelinsky) of Pamphilon declared his mission in Ukraine as an exarch of the Ecumenical Patriarchate was "the complete proclamation of the tomos and at the same time the unification council. So I'm coming back to my flock in the United States in literally a day."

On 8 January 2019, the tomos was brought back to Istanbul so that all the members of the Holy Synod of the Ecumenical Patriarchate could sign the tomos.

The representative of the press service of the OCU, priest Ivan Sydor, said the tomos was valid after the signature of the Ecumenical Patriarch, "but according to the procedure, there must also be the signatures of those bishops who take part in the synod of the Constantinople Patriarchate." Former press secretary of the UOC-KP, Eustratius (Zorya), declared the Ecumenical Patriarch recognized the OCU by signing the tomos of autocephaly and by concelebrating the liturgy with Epiphanius while considering Epiphanius as primate of the OCU. The Ecumenical Patriarchate declared on 8 January 2019 that the tomos was "approved and valid" and that the signing by the whole synod was a "purely technical step", and that "the validity of the tomos as an act of granting autocephaly is not in any way affected". It added that Ukraine had asked for the tomos to be brought to Ukraine for Christmas instead of leaving it in Istanbul for a few days until the whole synod signed it. Doctor in theology Cyrill Govorun of the UOC-MP argued that the tomos would take effect only when all the members of the synod of the Ecumenical Patriarchate will have signed it.

The tomos was signed by all members of the Holy synod of the Ecumenical Patriarchate on 9 January 2019. The tomos, signed by all members of the Holy synod of the Ecumenical Patriarchate, was brought back to Ukraine on the morning of 10 January 2019.

The tomos was made on a parchment by a famous painter and calligrapher of Mount Athos, hieromonk Lucas from the monastery of Xenophontos.

On 7 February 2019, Metropolitan Anthony of the UOC of the USA declared to President Poroshenko concerning the granting of the tomos: "The entire process was carried out by the Holy Spirit. We believed, but did not expect it to happen so soon. Thank God, you have led this process since last April starting from the visit to Constantinople. [...] This is an incredible and the most important event in the history of the Ukrainian nation. It seemed that it was impossible. You spoke as the great leader of the nation and entered the history of mankind as the man who brought the Tomos to Ukraine. We have been waiting for such a leadership for many years, much more than you."

== Events in Ukraine ==
=== Transfer of St Andrew's church ===
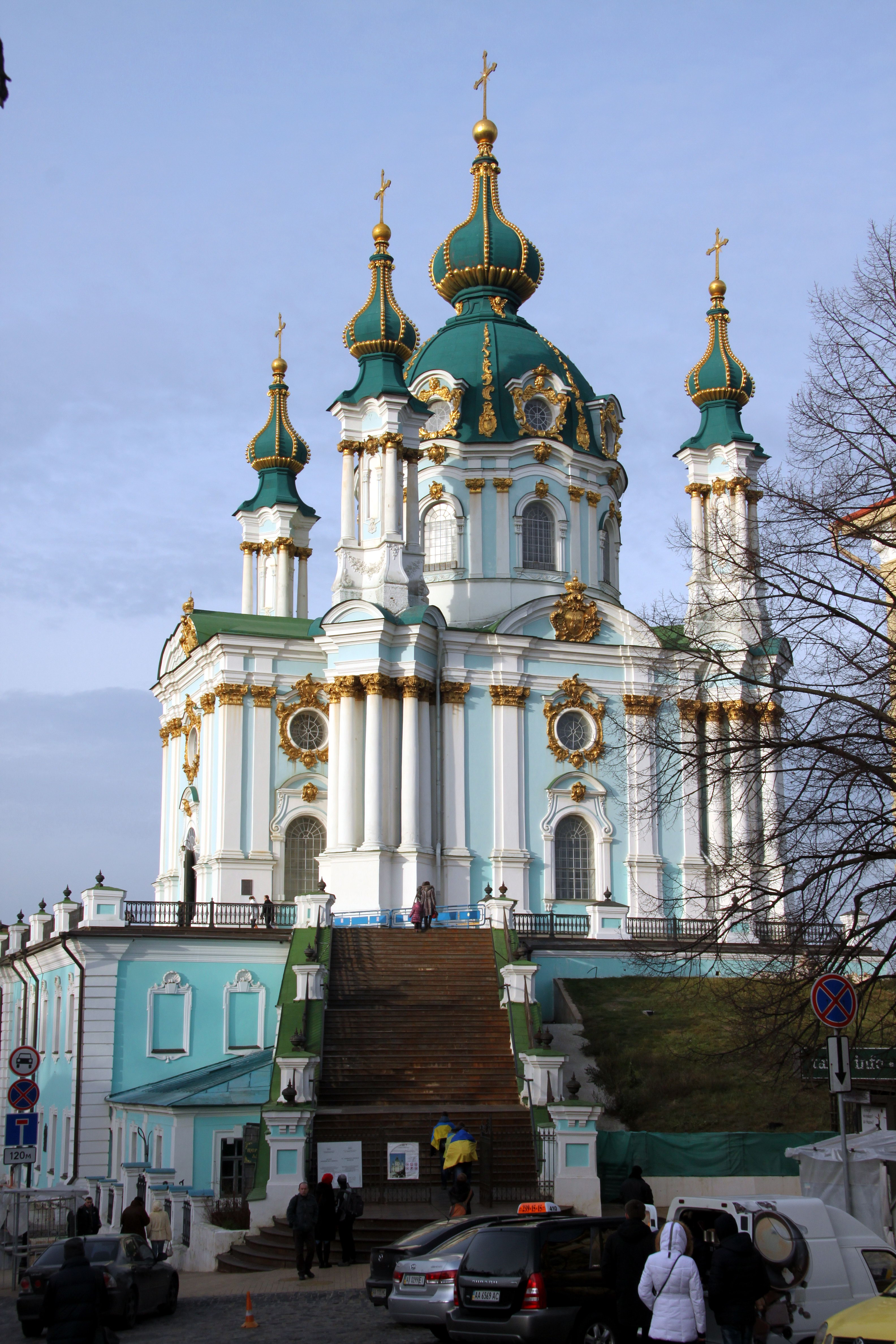
St Andrew's Church, Kyiv

On 18 October 2018, the Ukrainian parliament gave approval to give permanent use of the St Andrew's Church in Kyiv to the Patriarch of Constantinople for him to hold "worships, religious ceremonies and processions" in the said church, provided that St Andrew's church is also used as a museum and still belongs to the Ukrainian state. St Andrew's church will also serve, according to an official, as the Ecumenical Patriarchate's embassy in Ukraine. St Andrew's church previous owner was the Ukrainian Autocephalous Orthodox Church which accepted the transfer. The parliament had to vote on this decision because the church is part of a national heritage site owned by the state. The goal of this vote was, according to the KyivPost, to "speed up the receipt of a tomos (ordinance) – [the] recognition of a local Orthodox church in Ukraine by the global Orthodoxy". Iryna Lutsenko, the representative of the Ukrainian president in parliament, declared the goal of this action was to make a "sign of solidarity with this process [of Ukraine receiving a tomos]" as well as "a symbolic gesture of unity with the Mother-Church [Constantinople]". However, on the same day the Opposition Bloc introduced a motion to repeal the transfer, which meant that the Ukrainian President would not be able to sign the motion to transfer the St Andrew's church until the motion of repeal is reviewed by the Ukrainian parliament. Finally, President Poroshenko signed the law of transfer on 7 November 2018 and the law took effect on 10 November 2018. On 28 November 2018, in conformity with the law on religious organizations, the Cabinet of Ministers of Ukraine approved the transfer of the St Andrew's church to the Ecumenical Patriarchate's permanent use.

On the morning of 15 November, four unknown people threw Molotov cocktails at the St Andrew's church (but they didn't explode) and attacked the priest with a spray. On 27 November one of the suspects was arrested.

The first liturgy presided over by members of the Ecumenical Patriarchate in this church took place on 13 December 2018. This liturgy, at which hierarchs of the Ecumenical Patriarchate presided, was condemned by the UOC-MP. On 7 January 2019, bishop Hilarion (Rudnyk) of the Ecumenical Patriarchate celebrated the Christmas liturgy in St. Andrew's church.

=== Cancellation of the transfer of the Pochayiv Lavra ===
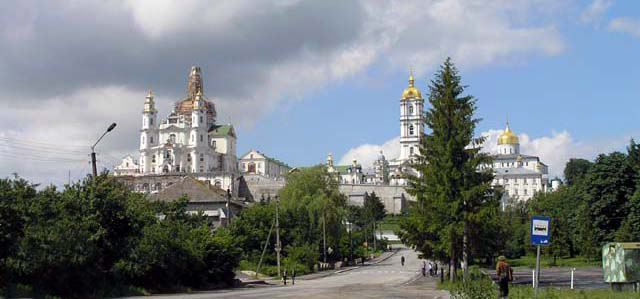
View of the Pochayiv Lavra in Ukraine.

On 16 November 2018 Ukrinform reported that the Ukrainian Culture Ministry had challenged the legality of the transfer of the Pochayiv Lavra, located in the Ternopil Oblast, to the UOC-MP. The Pochayiv Lavra is a historic site of Ukraine. Only in 2018, the local deputy of the Pochaiv city council found out that Yanukovych's 2003 order on the transfer of the Lavra until 2052 to the UOC-MP (№ 438) was carried out in an unknown way. The police of the Ternopil region opened proceedings in this case. Should the illegality of the transfer be established, the transfer would be cancelled. On 23 November 2018, the Ukrainian Ministry of Justice cancelled the transfer of the Pochayiv Lavra to the UOC-MP. On the next day, the UOC-MP monks of the Pochayiv Lavra clarified that "the commission of the Ministry of Justice of Ukraine, in response to the complaint from the Ministry of Culture of Ukraine, has cancelled the registration of the contract for the right to use the Assumption Cathedral, the Trinity Cathedral, monastic cells, the bell tower, the bishop's house and the Holy Gates." On 28 November, the Cabinet of Ministers of Ukraine approved the return of the Pochayiv Lavra to the Kremenets-Pochaev State Historical and Architectural Reserve by cancelling the 2003 transfer law which gave the use of the lavra to the UOC-MP and excluded the lavra from the Pochayiv Lavra to the Kremenets-Pochaev State Historical and Architectural Reserve.

=== Kerch Strait incident ===
On 27 November, the Chairman of the Verkhovna Rada (parliament), Andriy Parubiy, announced that the martial law that had been declared in some regions of Ukraine would not delay the receipt of the tomos of autocephaly and that, if anything, martial law was going to speed up the process of Ukraine receiving its tomos. On 28 November 2018 Ukrainian President Poroshenko declared that the Kerch Strait incident was provoked by Russia in order to force Ukraine to declare martial law and therefore to prevent Ukraine from receiving its tomos of autocephaly.

=== Laws on the churches' names and transfers ===
On 15 December, Filaret requested Chairman of the Ukrainian parliament Andriy Parubiy that the bills 5309 and 4128 be voted in parliament. In October 2018, the press secretary of the UOC-KP had already called the Ukrainian Parliament to pass the bill n. 5309. On 19 December 2018, Filaret declared himself in favor of the bill n. 5309.

==== Bill n. 5309, churches' names ====
It was expected that on 20 December 2018, the Ukrainian Parliament was going vote a law to force the UOC-MP to change its name (bill n. 5309). This law concerns the name of religious organizations (associations) that are part of a religious organization (association) whose governing center is outside the borders of Ukraine, in a state which, according to the Law of Ukraine, is recognized as carrying out military aggression against Ukraine and/or temporarily occupying part of the territory of Ukraine. On 20 December, the bill was successfully voted, while members of the UOC-MP were holding a protest outside the parliament. Soon after the law was passed, a brawl erupted in the parliament between the deputies.

On 20 December, the UOC-MP called the Ukrainian President to veto the bill. The next day, Epiphanius of Kyiv, primate of the OCU, declared his support for this bill. On 22 December, President Poroshenko signed the law 2662-VIII (formerly bill 5309) and said that those changes in the law created "better conditions" for the exercise of freedom of choice of religion "for those who decide which Orthodox jurisdiction to belong to ... Either to the newly created autocephalous Orthodox Church of Ukraine, or to the church that insists on maintaining its connection and dependence on ROC". On 25 December, the UOC-MP said it would appeal to Constitutional Court to invalidate the law of the bill 5309.

The law of the bill 5309 became effective on 27 December 2018. "From now on, the state body for religious affairs – the Department of Religions and Nationalities – must conduct a religious expert examination that determines which religious organizations are subject to this provision. The results of the examination will be published in the official publication Uriadovy Kuryer. Communities have 9 months to change their name and submit relevant documents to public authorities. Otherwise, the statute of the respective religious organization will cease to be in force in the part which defines its full official name."

===== Judiciary development =====
On 18 January, 49 members of the Ukrainian Parliament, most of them from the Opposition Bloc and including the party's leader, appealed to the Constitutional Court of Ukraine to repeal the law 2662-VIII (formerly bill 5309). The Minister of Justice of Ukraine declared such an appeal did not prevent the law from having an effect.

On 26 January 2019, the Ukrainian Ministry of Culture published through the official publication Uryadovy Kuryer the list of religious organizations which had to change their charter to be in compliance with the Ukrainian law of the bill 5309. The list included the Ukrainian Orthodox Church (Moscow Patriarchate), as well as the True Russian Orthodox Church, the Russian Orthodox Old-Rite Church, the Russian Old-Orthodox Church and the Pomorian Old-Orthodox Church. Those five churches "within three months should make amendments to their statutory documents provided under Part 7 Article 12 of the Law "On Freedom of Conscience and Religious Organizations" and submit them for registration as required." "The document gives the parishes and monasteries of the Ukrainian Orthodox Church three months to state in their charter that they belong to a religious organization with a center in a state "that has committed military aggression against Ukraine and temporarily occupied its territory.""

Metropolitan Hilarion, head of the DECR of the Moscow Patriarchate, compared this law to the yellow star the Jews were forced to wear in the Third Reich.

On 18 February 2019, the Culture Ministry of Ukraine declared the activities of a religious organization can be terminated by a court ruling if said organization refused to comply with the law.

In April 2019, Interfax reported, quoting a Facebook post from Vadim Novinsky of the Opposition Bloc, that the District Administrative Court of Kyiv had ruled that the forced renaming of the UOC-MP was unconstitutional. Chairman of the Verkhovna Rada Andriy Parubiy said this decision was not final and will be appealed. On 22 April, the District Administrative Court of Kyiv announced it had suspended the renaming of the UOC-MP "until the completion of the proceedings on the merits [of the case]." Andriy Parubiy declared this decision of the court to suspend the law was "absurd" and that "the law has not been repealed, it is in force, it was adopted by the Verkhovna Rada of Ukraine, the resolution was suspended, and the law is in force." He added the legal department of the parliament would defend the legality of the law 2662-VIII.

On 20 April 2019, the Constitutional Court of Ukraine opened the proceedings concerning the 18 January appeal of the 49 MPs who want to declare the law 2662-VIII (formerly bill 5309) unconstitutional.

On 22 July 2019, "the Sixth Administrative Court of Appeal held a court hearing on the appeal of the Ministry of Culture against the ruling of the District Administrative Court of Kyiv of April 22, 2019, which satisfied the motion of the Kyiv Metropolis UOC (MP), the website of the Legal Department of the UOC (MP) said."

In December 2019, Yurash, director of the Department of Religious and Nationalities Affairs, said the District Administrative Court of Kyiv had not blocked the law. He said: "This is a misunderstanding [...] There is a submission by 49 deputies to the Constitutional Court demanding to declare this law unconstitutional. The court has not yet ruled. The law can lose its force only after the corresponding decision. But in order to secure a lawsuit by lawyers of the same party who appealed to the Constitutional Court, in the spring an application was filed to ban registration actions" Thereafter, in the same month, the Supreme Court of Ukraine said the UOC-MP could not be forced to be renamed until the question of whether the OCU had its administrative center in Ukraine or in Russia had been set.

On 11 February 2020, the Constitutional Court of Ukraine started reviewing the constitutionality of the law.

==== Bill n. 4128, churches' transfers ====
The bill 4128, which concerns churches communities who want to be put under another jurisdiction, was momentarily postponed after the vote of the bill 5309. The bill 4128 was proposed in 2016. President of Parliament, Andriy Parubiy, declared he had asked the Parliamentary Committee on Culture and Spirituality to rewrite the bill 4128 in order for it to be "in accordance with the recommendations and decisions of the European Court of Human Rights".

The new version of the bill, revised by the Committee on Culture and Spirituality, was numbered "4128-d" and was successfully voted on by the Ukrainian parliament on 17 January 2019. On 22 January 2019, Poroshenko promised to sign the law. On 28 January 2019, President Poroshenko signed the law. "According to the law, the state authorities recognize the right of a religious community to change the subordination of religious centers by registering a new edition of the charter or introducing some amendments to the current one. The decision to modify the subordination is made at a general assembly of a religious community. This assembly can be called up by members of this community." On 30 January 2019, the law n. 2673-VIII (formerly bill 4128-d) was published in the Holos Ukrayiny, the law came into force the next day after its publication, on 31 January 2019.

In March 2019, the Constitutional Court of Ukraine declared it refused to open a case on the constitutionality of this law.

Ukrainian MP Volodymyr Yelenskiy declared the law 4128 was in accordance with the 2007 "Svyato-Mykhaylivska Parafiya v. Ukraine" decision of the European Court of Human Rights. (Note: The decision can be read here.)

=== Security Service of Ukraine (SBU) raids ===
The Security Service of Ukraine (SBU) has carried out raids across the country targeting the Ukrainian Orthodox Church (Moscow Patriarchate) churches and interrogated priests of the Moscow Patriarchy in November and December 2018, accusing them of being agents of the Russian government. According to Metropolitan Pavel, "There is a pressure on me personally, threats are being heard, all sorts of attacks not only on me, but also on other bishops and priests. For what reason I do not know."

== See also ==
- 2018 Moscow–Constantinople schism
- History of Christianity in Ukraine
