= Church of Greece =

Autocephalous church of Eastern Orthodox Christianity

Church of Greece
- Ancient Greek: Ἐκκλησία τῆς Ἑλλάδος; Modern Greek: Εκκλησία της Ελλάδος
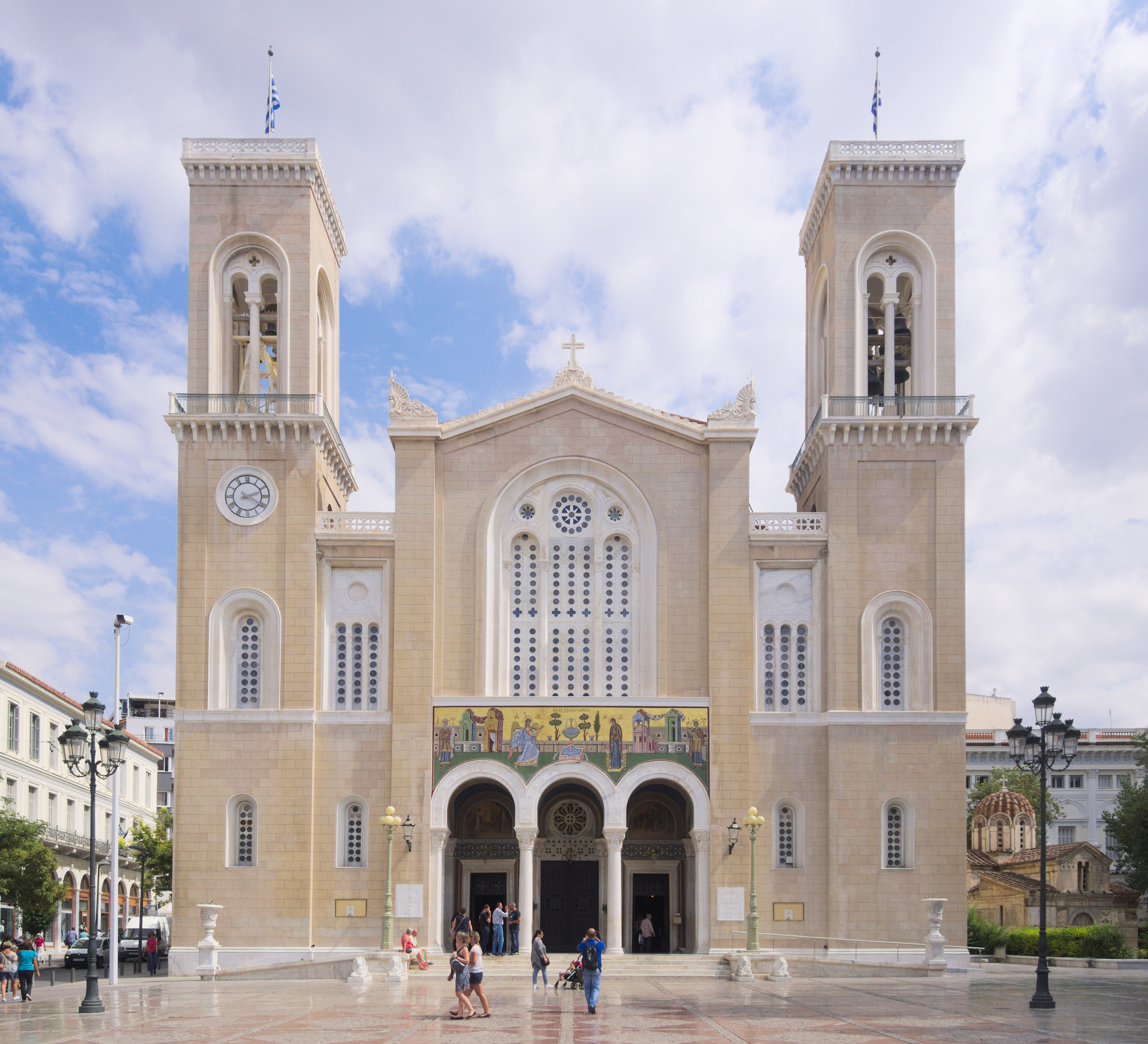
- Metropolitan Cathedral of Athens
- Type: Autocephaly
- Classification: Christian
- Orientation: Eastern Orthodox (Greek Orthodox)
- Scripture: Septuagint; New Testament
- Theology: Eastern Orthodox theology
- Polity: Episcopal
- Primate: Ieronymos II of Athens
- Bishops: 101
- Priests: 8,515
- Monastics: 3,541
- Monasteries: 541
- Language: Koine Greek
- Liturgy: Byzantine Rite
- Headquarters: Metropolitan Cathedral of Athens and Petraki Monastery, Athens, Greece
- Territory: Greece (except Crete, Dodecanese, Mount Athos, and the Greek Orthodox churches in the Diaspora)
- Founder: Dionysius the Areopagite (tradition)
- Origin: Achaea, Roman Empire
- Independence: 1833
- Recognition: Autocephaly recognized by the Ecumenical Patriarchate of Constantinople in 1850 (Tomos dated June 29, 1850)
- Separated from: Ecumenical Patriarchate of Constantinople
- Separations: Greek Old Calendarists
- Members: 8–10 million
- Official website: ecclesia.gr

The Church of Greece (Greek: Ἐκκλησία τῆς Ἑλλάδος, romanized: Ekklēsía tē̂s Helládos, Greek pronunciation: [ekliˈsi.a tis eˈlaðos]), is an autocephalous Greek Orthodox church and one of the churches within the communion of the Eastern Orthodox Church. Its canonical territory is confined to the borders of Greece prior to the Balkan Wars of 1912–1913 ("Old Greece"). The rest of Greece (the "New Lands", Crete, and the Dodecanese) is under the jurisdiction of the Ecumenical Patriarchate of Constantinople. However, most dioceses of the Metropolises of the New Lands are de facto administered as part of the Church of Greece for practical reasons, under an agreement between the churches of Athens and Constantinople. The primate of the Church of Greece is the archbishop of Athens and All Greece.

== History ==
=== Autocephaly ===
Christianity was first brought to the geographical area corresponding to modern Greece by the Apostle Paul, although the church's apostolicity also rests upon St. Andrew who preached the gospel in Greece and suffered martyrdom in Patras; Titus, Paul's companion who preached the gospel in Crete where he became bishop; Philip who, according to the tradition, visited and preached in Athens; Luke the Evangelist who was martyred in Thebes; Lazarus of Bethany, Bishop of Kition in Cyprus; and John the Theologian who was exiled on the island of Patmos where he received the Revelation recorded in the last book of the New Testament. Thus Greece became the first European area to accept the gospel of Christ. Towards the end of the 2nd century the early apostolic bishoprics had developed into metropolitan sees in the most important cities. Such were the sees of Thessaloniki, Corinth, Nicopolis, Philippi and Athens.

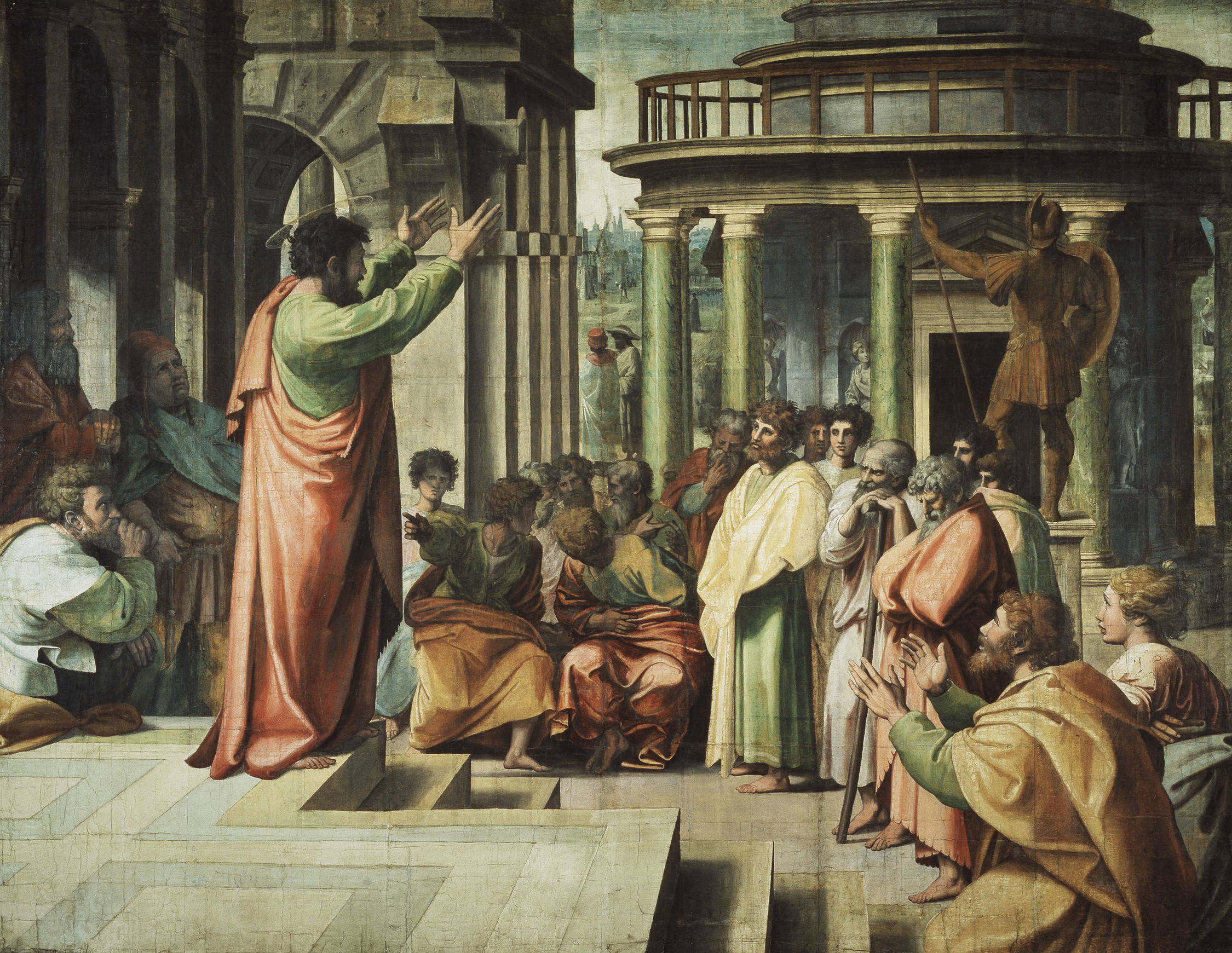
Saint Paul delivering the Areopagus Sermon in Athens, by Raphael, 1515.

Before 1833, the Church of Greece was under the jurisdiction of the Ecumenical Patriarchate. During the Greek War of Independence, the First National Assembly in 1821 and the Third at Troizina in 1827 established provisional arrangements for ecclesiastical governance in the emerging Greek state. In 1828, Governor Ioannis Kapodistrias appointed an ecclesiastical committee, and the Fourth National Assembly at Argos established the Secretariat of Ecclesiastical Affairs and Public Education. These measures reflected the increasing tendency toward the formation of a national church aligned with the institutions of the new state.

In 1833, the Regency council, led by Georg Ludwig von Maurer and including clerics such as Theoklitos Farmakidis, prepared plans for the organization of a national church. In the same year, the Church of Greece was declared autocephalous by the Bavarian Regents acting on behalf of King Otto, who was a minor at the time. This act reflected both political considerations and the broader context of state formation, as the Greek authorities sought to establish an ecclesiastical structure independent of a Patriarchate situated outside the boundaries of the new state.

On 25 July 1833, King Otto ratified the royal decree entitled "Declaration on the Independence of the Church of Greece", which established the first Permanent Synod of Hierarchs and served as the constitutional framework of the church until 1852. Relations with the Ecumenical Patriarchate were initially strained, leading to a temporary rupture of communion, until the Patriarchate issued a Tomos in 1850 formally recognizing the autocephaly of the Church of Greece.

The political union of the Ionian Islands with Greece in 1864 was followed by their ecclesiastical incorporation into the Church of Greece under terms agreed with the Patriarchate. Likewise, the Metropolises of Thessaly and parts of Epirus were incorporated following their annexation to Greece in 1882.

=== Period 1930–1974 ===
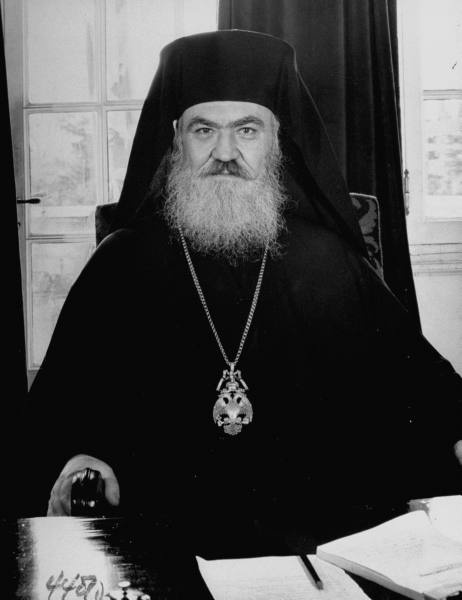
Damaskinos of Athens, persecuted by the Metaxas dictatorship for his democratic convictions. Later, as Archbishop, he carried out significant humanitarian work for Jews and Christians during the Occupation.

On 31 August 1936, the Apostolic Diaconate of the Church of Greece was established. Organizational adjustments were subsequently implemented through A.N. 2169/1940, 976/1946, Legislative Decree 126/1969 (Article 36), and Regulation 3/1969. According to the Statutory Charter of the Church of Greece (Law 590/1977, Article 40), "the Apostolic Diaconate of the Church of Greece, under the supervision and control of the Holy Synod, is responsible for planning, organizing, and executing all missionary and educational work of the Church."

During the Metaxas dictatorship, following the death of Archbishop Chrysostomos on 23 April 1938, Chrysanthus of Athens was installed as Archbishop of Athens through the intervention of the dictatorial regime, despite Damaskinos of Athens having received the majority of votes in the archiepiscopal election. Chrysanthus was Metaxas preferred candidate. Metaxas sought to exert control over the Church of Greece through the archiepiscopal election. As a result, Damaskinos was placed under restriction, guarded by the Gendarmerie, at the Monastery of Faneromeni in Salamina, where he remained throughout the Metaxas regime and the Greco-Italian War.

Damaskinos of Athens was re‑elected Archbishop in 1941. His actions during the Occupation were characterized by bold initiatives and deep pastoral concern for the suffering Greek population. Facing the threat of famine, he sought to implement two unfulfilled contracts negotiated by the Metaxas government: the purchase of 370,000 tons of wheat from Australia and a loan to Turkey of 600,000 Turkish lira for food procurement. However, these efforts were obstructed by Britain, which refused to allow supplies to occupied Greece due to wartime restrictions, while the contract with Turkey yielded only a small contribution to the national food supply.

Subsequently, Damaskinos organized the National Organization for Christian Solidarity (E.O.X.A.), establishing branches throughout Greece to facilitate food distribution. He also drafted a new Statutory Charter of the Church of Greece, which was published as Law 671/1943 on 25 September 1943 and ratified post‑Occupation by Ministerial Council Act 184/26‑3‑1946. This Charter remained in effect, with minor amendments, until 1977.

His efforts to save Greek Jews and Roma, who began to be sent to extermination camps in 1943, are among his most notable achievements. Baptism certificates were issued to Jews to present them as Christians and thereby avoid arrest or deportation. Damaskinos repeatedly protested to German senior officials against the ongoing persecution of Jews. One of his letters states:

In our national consciousness, all the children of Mother Greece are an inseparable unity: they are equal members of the national body irrespective of religion... Our holy religion does not recognize superior or inferior qualities based on race or religion, as it is stated: 'There is neither Jew nor Greek' and thus condemns any attempt to discriminate or create racial or religious differences. Our common fate both in days of glory and in periods of national misfortune forged inseparable bonds between all Greek citizens, without exemption, irrespective of race.

For his role in saving hundreds of Greek Jews, he was honored by Yad Vashem as Righteous Among the Nations.

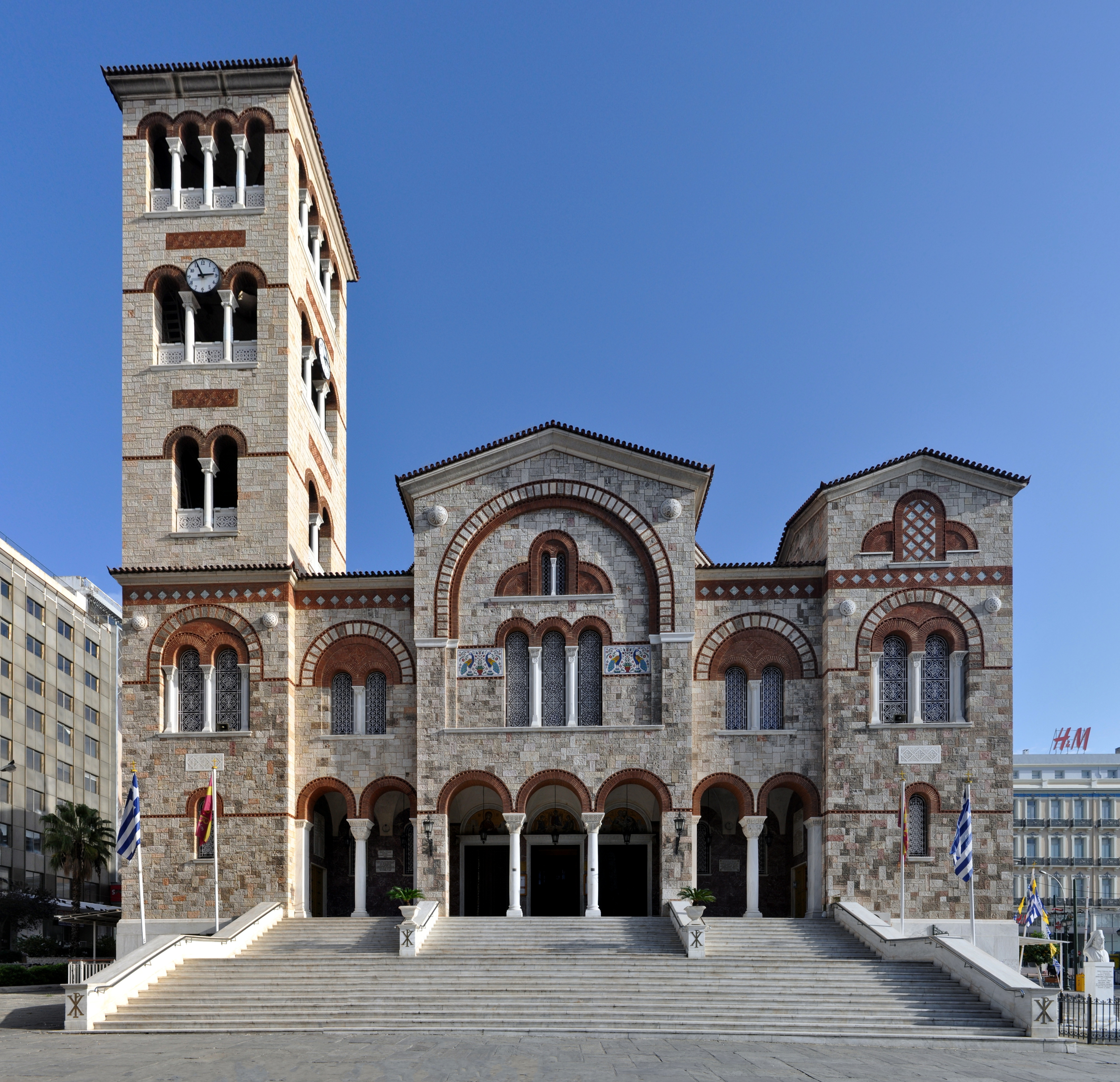
Hagia Triada Cathedral, Piraeus

During the National Resistance, Metropolitan Ioakeim of Kozani served as a national advisor to the EAM. In mainland Greece, several metropolitans collaborated with the Resistance, including Metropolitans Gregorios of Chalkida, Iakovos of Attica, Ioakeim of Dimitriada, Dimitrios of Dryinoupolis and Konitsa, and Kallinikos of Larissa and Elassona. In the Eastern Aegean islands, Ioakeim Stroubis of Chios, Eirenaios of Samos and Ikaria (later President of the Provisional Government Committee after Italy’s surrender in September 1943), and Dionysios of Mythymna also participated.

During the seven‑year dictatorship of 1967–1974, the church experienced significant disruption due to numerous interventions by the regime in its internal affairs. Most interventions were in clear violation of Canon Law and ecclesiastical order. These irregular interventions were often accepted or even facilitated by the church administration, which had emerged after orchestrated legislative changes imposed by the dictatorship. Examples include the forced resignation of the lawful Archbishop of Athens and All Greece, Chrysostomos II of Athens, and the appointment of the palace priest Hieronymos Kotsonis as Archbishop of Athens and All Greece by an eight‑member "Aristindyn" Synod. The dictatorship sought to exploit the church’s societal influence and, in cooperation with the ecclesiastical leadership, appropriated the values of "Greek‑Christian culture" to legitimize the regime — not out of concern for Hellenism or Christianity, but to achieve social and political validation.

=== Zoë movement ===
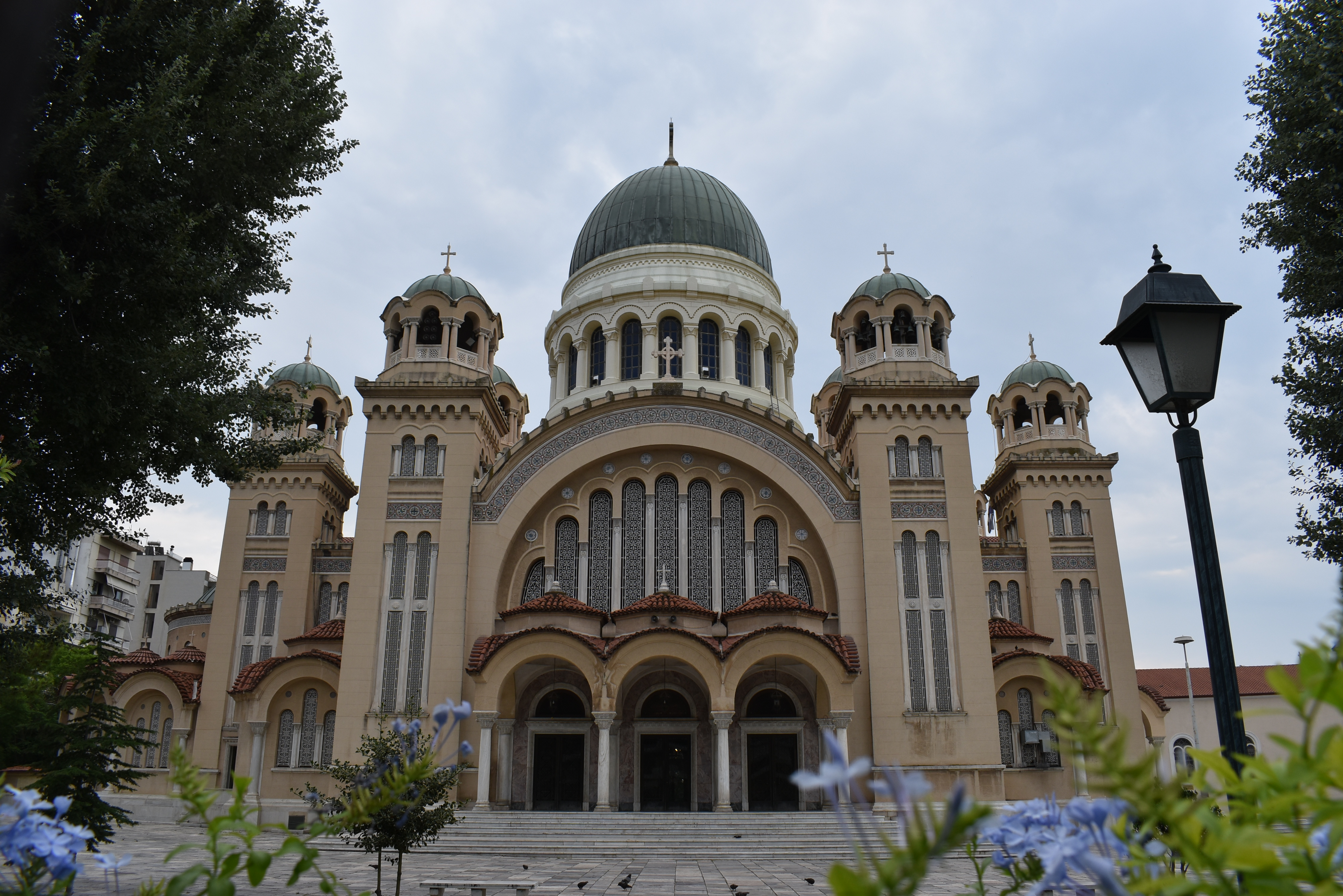
Cathedral of Saint Andrew, Patras

The 20th-century religious revival in Greece included the Zoë (Zoe) movement, a Greek Orthodox semimonastic association founded in 1907 by Eusebius Matthopoulos. Named after the Greek word for "life", the movement operated largely independently of the institutional Greek Orthodox Church and developed a strong, decentralized organizational structure centered primarily in Athens. Zoë brought together both laypeople and clergy; its core consisted of highly disciplined, unmarried members bound by vows of poverty, chastity, and obedience, approximately half of whom were ordained priests.

Zoë was actively engaged in teaching, preaching, publishing, and the administration of schools, youth organizations, and professional associations throughout Greece. It sponsored a nationwide Sunday School program operating in approximately 7,800 churches and provided religious education to an estimated 150,000 students. The movement also established affiliated organizations for youth, parents, professionals, and young women nurses, and promoted the widespread distribution of Bibles, religious literature, and pamphlets. Its publications reached hundreds of thousands of copies annually in the period following World War II. Zoë encouraged greater lay participation in liturgical and sacramental life and contributed to a broader revival of religious practice in Greece.

The movement was initially viewed with suspicion by the Orthodox episcopate, which objected to its strong independent organization. Its influence was later weakened by internal divisions, including the departure of several members who formed a rival association, Soter, as well as by its close associations with the military dictatorship established in Greece in 1967. By the late 20th century, Zoë’s prominence had significantly declined.

In a 2019 interview with Norman Russell, the Greek philosopher Christos Yannaras stated that although he had participated in the Zoë movement in his youth, he later came to regard it as crypto-Protestant in character.

=== Canonization of Asia Minor New Martyrs ===
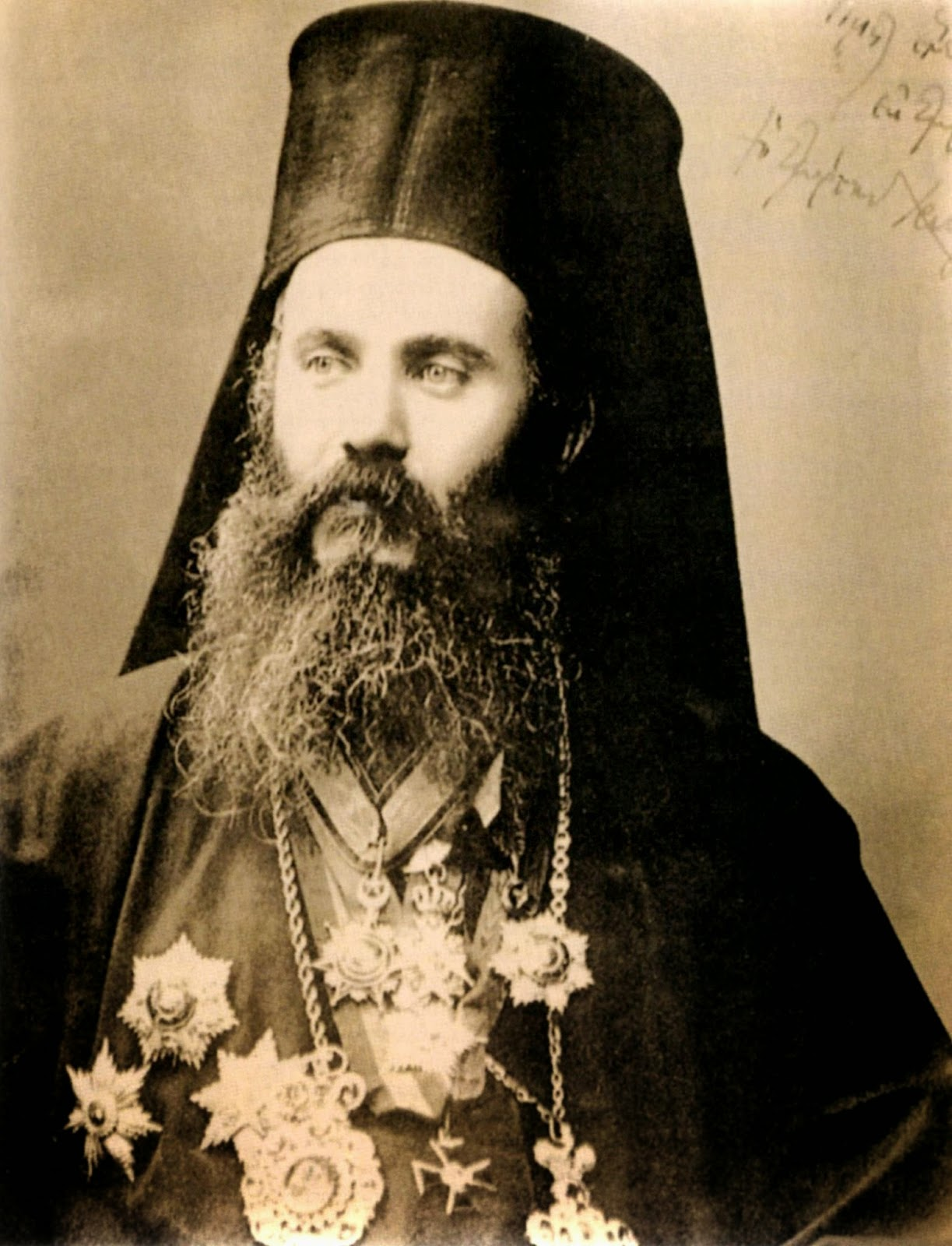
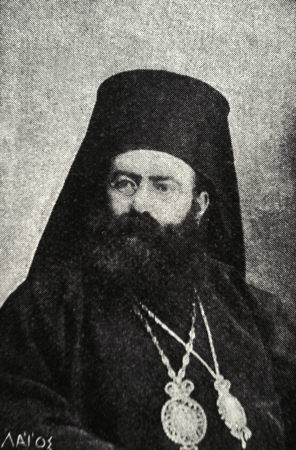
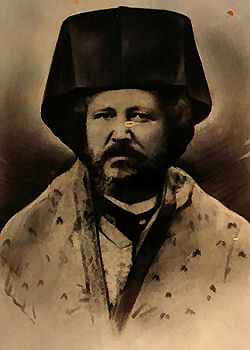
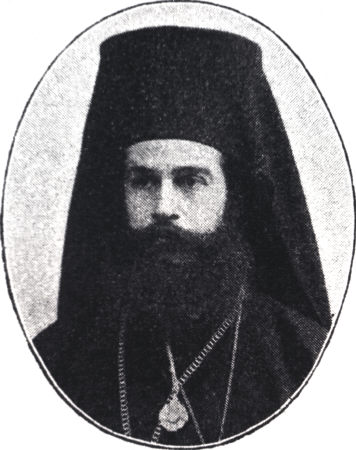
Among the victims of the atrocities committed by the Turkish nationalist Army (1922–23) were hundreds of Christian clergy in Anatolia, including metropolitan bishops (from left): Chrysostomos of Smyrna (lynched), Prokopios of Iconium (imprisoned and poisoned, not pictured), Gregory of Kydonies (executed), Euthymios of Zelon (died in prison and posthumously hanged), Ambrosios of Moschonisia (buried alive).

On 4 November 1992, the Holy Synod of the Church of Greece unanimously declared the martyr Chrysostomos of Smyrna a saint of the Orthodox Church, to be commemorated on the Sunday after the Exaltation of the Holy Cross, together with the Asia Minor hierarchs and martyrs Prokopios Lazaridis, Ambrosios of Moschonisia, Euthymios Agritellis, Gregory of Kydonies, and all Orthodox Christians who were killed during the Asia Minor Catastrophe.

The canonization recognized Chrysostomos of Smyrna's death as a martyrdom suffered during the final phase of the Greco-Turkish War (1919–1922), when the Greek population of Smyrna (modern-day İzmir) experienced widespread violence and displacement during the Asia Minor Catastrophe. Chrysostomos, who had served as the Metropolitan of Smyrna since 1910, remained in the city during the Turkish capture of Smyrna in September 1922 and was killed by a mob shortly after the withdrawal of Greek forces.

The decision of the Holy Synod placed Chrysostomos among the most prominent modern Orthodox martyrs associated with the events of 1922. His canonization was also connected with the broader ecclesiastical recognition of the clergy and laity who died during the destruction of the Greek Orthodox communities of Asia Minor. The Church of Greece emphasized that the commemoration was intended to honor the faith and witness of those who suffered during the Asia Minor Catastrophe rather than to serve as a political statement.

Their inclusion in the liturgical calendar was formally announced in Circular 2556 of 5 July 1993 by the Holy Synod of the Church of Greece. The commemoration of "Saint Chrysostomos of Smyrna and his fellow hierarchs Gregory of Kydonies, Ambrosios of Moschonisia, Prokopios Lazaridis, Euthymios Agritellis, as well as the clergy and laity who were killed during the Asia Minor Catastrophe" is observed annually on the Sunday following the feast of the Exaltation of the Holy Cross in September.

== Prevailing religion of Greece ==
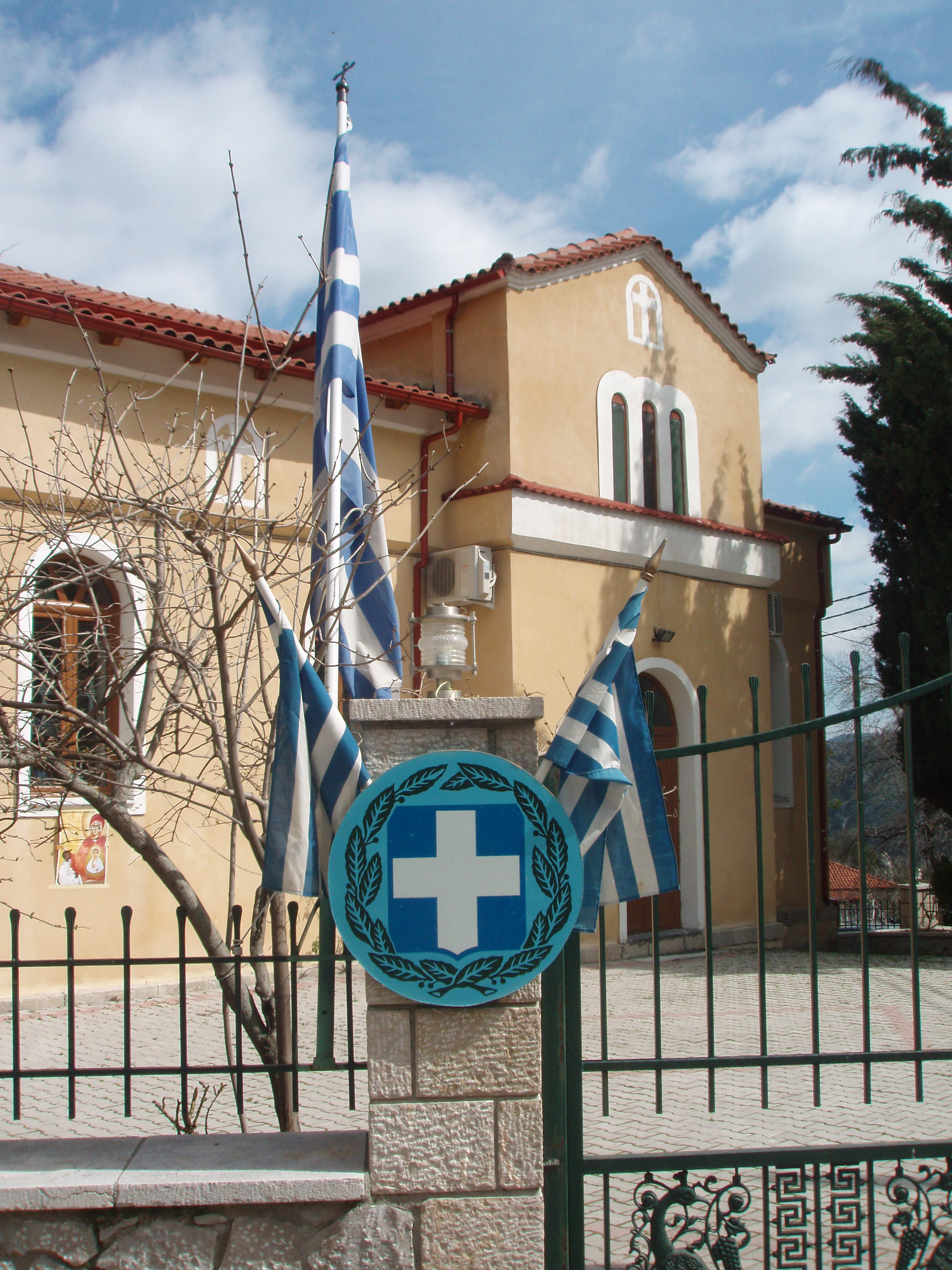
According to the Constitution, Greek Orthodoxy is the prevailing religion of Greece; this is reinforced by displays of the Greek flag and coat of arms at church properties.

Adherence to the Eastern Orthodox Church was established as a definitive hallmark of Greek ethnic identity in the first modern Greek constitution, the "Epidaurus Law" of 1822. This occurred during the Greek War of Independence. The preamble of all subsequent Greek constitutions simply states "In the name of the Holy, Consubstantial, and Indivisible Trinity," and the Orthodox Church of Christ is established as the "prevailing" religion of Greece.

Mainstream Orthodox clergy salaries and pensions are paid by the State, at rates comparable to teachers. The church had previously compensated the State by a tax of 35% on ordinary revenues of the church, but in 2004 this tax was abolished by Law 3220/2004. By virtue of its status as the prevailing religion, the canon law of the church is recognized by the Greek government in matters pertaining to church administration. Religious marriages and baptisms are legally equivalent to their civil counterparts. All Greek Orthodox primary and secondary students attend religious instruction.

Liaisons between church and state are handled by the Ministry of National Education and Religious Affairs.

== Church hierarchy ==
Flag of the Church of Greece

Supreme authority is vested in the synod of all the diocesan bishops who have metropolitan status (the Holy Synod of the Church of Greece, Greek: Ἱερὰ Σύνοδος τῆς Ἐκκλησίας τῆς Ἑλλάδος, romanized: Hierà Sýnodos tês Ekklēsías tês Helládos Greek pronunciation: [ieˈra ˈsinoðos tis ekliˈsias tis eˈlaðos]), which operates under the de jure presidency of the Archbishop of Athens and All Greece. This synod deals with general church issues. The Standing Synod is under the same presidency and consists of the Primate and 12 bishops; each member serves for one term on a rotating basis and handles administrative matters.

The church is organized into 81 dioceses, of which 36, located in northern Greece and the major islands in the north and northeast Aegean, are nominally and spiritually under the jurisdiction of the Ecumenical Patriarchate of Constantinople. The Patriarchate retains certain privileges in these dioceses—for example, their bishops must acknowledge the Patriarch as their primate during prayers. These dioceses are called the "New Lands" (Νέαι Χώραι, or Néai Chōrai), as they became part of the modern Greek state only after the Balkan Wars, and are represented by 6 of the 12 bishops of the Standing Synod. A bishop elected to one of the Sees of the New Lands must be confirmed by the Patriarch of Constantinople before assuming his duties. These dioceses are administered by the Church of Greece "in stewardship," and their bishops retain the right of appeal (the "ékklēton") to the Patriarch.

The dioceses of Crete (Church of Crete), the Dodecanese, and the Monastic state of Holy Mount Athos remain under the direct jurisdiction of the Patriarchate of Constantinople and are not part of the Church of Greece. The Archdiocese of Crete enjoys semiautonomous status: new bishops are elected by the local Synod of incumbents, and the Archbishop is appointed by the Ecumenical Patriarchate from a three-person list (the triprósōpon) drawn by the Greek Ministry of National Education and Religious Affairs from among the incumbent Metropolitans of Crete.

== Clergy and monastics ==
As in other Orthodox Christian churches, male graduates of seminaries run by the church (and financed by the Greek state) may be ordained as deacons and eventually as priests. They are allowed to marry before their ordination as deacons, but not afterwards. The vast majority of parish clergy in Greece are married. Alternatively, they may enter monasteries and/or take monastic vows. Monastics who are ordained as priests and possess a university degree in theology are eligible as candidates for the episcopate (archimandrites). Women may also take monastic vows and become nuns. In 2004, the Holy Synod of the Church of Greece voted to reinstate the female diaconate, but limited the ordination of women as deaconesses to monastic communities.

Monasteries are either affiliated with their local diocese or directly with one of the Orthodox Patriarchates; in the latter case, they are called "Stauropegiac" monasteries (Stayropēgiaká, "springs of the Cross").

== Administration and Hierarchy of the Throne ==
Head of the Church of Greece and of the Holy Synod is Archbishop Ieronymos II (Ioannis Liapis), Archbishop of Athens and All Greece (2008–).

=== Metropolises and metropolitans of the Church of Greece ===
- Metropolis of Aetolia and Acarnania: Damaskinos Kiametis (2022–)
- Metropolis of Argolis: Nektarios Anttonopoulos (2013–)
- Metropolis of Arta: Kallinikos Korombokis (2016–)
- Metropolis of Cephalonia: Dimitrios Argiros (2015–)
- Metropolis of Chalcis, Istiaia and Sporades Islands: Chrysostomos (Konstantinos) Triantafyllou (2001–)
- Metropolis of Corfu, Paxoi and the Diapontian Islands: Nektarios (Dimitrios) Dovas (2002–)
- Metropolis of Corinth: Dionysios Mantalos (2006–)
- Metropolis of Demetrias and Almyros: Ignatios (Panagiotis) Georgakopoulos (1998–)
- Metropolis of Elis and Olena: Athanasios Bachos (2022–)
- Metropolis of Glyfada and Aexoni: Antonios Avramiotis (2019–)
- Metropolis of Gortyna and Megalopolis: Nikiforos Eustathiou (2022–)
- Metropolis of Gytheion and Oitylo (Metropolis of Mani from 2010): Chrysostomos Papathanasiou (2018–)
- Metropolis of Hydra, Spetses and Aegina: Ephraem (Evangelos) Stenakis (2001–)
- Metropolis of Kalavrita and Aigialeia: Ieronymos (Nikolaos) Karmas (2019–)
- Metropolis of Karpenisi: Georgios Rempelos (2016–)
- Metropolis of Karystos and Skyros: Seraphim (Sokrates) Roris (1968–)
- Metropolis of Kessariani, Vyronas and Hymettus: Daniel (Dionysios) Pourtsouklis (2000–)
- Metropolis of Kifissia, Amaroussion and Oropos: Kyrillos (Konstantinos) Misiakoulis^{1} (2010–)
- Metropolis of Kythira: Seraphim (lambros) Stergioulis (2005–)
- Metropolis of Ilion, Acharnes and Petroupolis: Athenagoras (Georgios) Dikaiakos^{1} (2010–)
- Metropolis of Larissa and Tyrnavos: Hieronimos Nikolopoulos (2018–)
- Metropolis of Leucada and Ithaca: Theofilos (Konstantinos) Manolatos (2008–)
- Metropolis of Mantineia and Kynouria: Alexandros Papadopoulos (1995–)
- Metropolis of Megara and Salamis: Konstantinos Giakoumakis (2014–)
- Metropolis of Mesogeia and Lavreotiki: Nikolaos Hatzinikolaou (2004–)
- Metropolis of Messinia: Chrysostomos (Georgios) Savvatos (2007–)
- Metropolis of Monemvasia and Sparta: Eustathios (Konstantinos) Speliotis (1980–)
- Metropolis of Nafpaktos and Agios Vlasios: Hierotheos Vlachos (1995–)
- Metropolis of Nea Ionia and Philadelphia: Gabriel Papanicolaou (2014–)
- Metropolis of New Smyrna: Symeon (Periklis) Koutsas (2002–)
- Metropolis of Nicaea: Alexios Vryonis (1995–)
- Metropolis of Paronaxia (Paros, Naxos and Antiparos): Kallinikos (Nikolaos) Demenopoulos (2008–)
- Metropolis of Patras: Chrysostomos (Christos) Sklifas (2005–)
- Metropolis of Peristeri: Gregorios Papathomas (2021–)
- Metropolis of Phocis: Theoktistos (Theodore) Kloukinas (2014–)
- Metropolis of Phthiotis: Symeon Voliotis (2019–)
- Metropolis of Piraeus: Seraphim Mentzenopoulos (2006–)
- Metropolis of Stagi and Meteora: Theoklitos Lamprinakos (2017–)
- Metropolis of Syros, Tinos, Andros, Kea and Milos: Dorotheos Polykandriotis (2001–)
- Metropolis of Thessaliotida, Fanari and Pharsalos: Timotheos (Nikolaos) Anthis (2014–)
- Metropolis of Thebes and Livadeia: Georgios Matzouranis (2008–)
- Metropolis of Thera, Amorgos and the Islands: Amfilochios Rousakis (2021–)
- Metropolis of Trifyllia and Olympia: Chrysostomos (Alexandros) Stavropoulos (2007–)
- Metropolis of Trikke and Stagi^{2}: Chrysostomos Nasis (2015–), the metropolis was renamed "Trikis, Gardikiou and Pylis" in 2021
- Metropolis of Zakynthos and Strophades: Dionysios (Dimitrios) Sifnaios (2011–)

Notes
^{1} In 2010 the Metropolis of Attica was split into 2 new Metropolises, the Metropolis of Kifissia, Amaroussion and Oropos (temporary Vicar: the Metropolitan of Mesogeia) and the Metropolis of Ilion, Acharnes and Petroupolis (temporary Vicar: the Metropolitan of Megara)
^{2} The Metropolis of Trikke was separated from the Metropolis of Stagi (and Meteora) in 1981 but still bears the titular name "Trikke and Stagi"

=== Titular metropolises and metropolitans ===
- Metropolis of Acheloos (Agrinio): Vacant
- Metropolis of Achaia: Athanasios Hatzopoulos (2007–)

=== Titular dioceses and bishops ===
- Diocese of Euripos: Chrysostomos (Marios) Panagopoulos (2019–)
- Diocese of Stavropigi: Alexios (Stamatios) Psoinos (2023–)
- Diocese of Christopolis: Vacant
- Diocese of Velestino: Damaskinos (Ioannis) Kasanakis (2003–)
- Diocese of Koronia: Panteleimon Kathreptidis (2003–)
- Diocese of Neochori: Pavlos Athanatos (1995–)
- Diocese of Marathon: Vacant
- Diocese of Thermopylae: Ioannis Sakellariou (2000–)
- Diocese of Fanari: Agathangelos (Vasileios) Haramantidis (2003–)
- Diocese of Photice : Nektarios (Ioannis) Milionis (2023–)
- Diocese of Tanagra: Apostolos Kavaliotis (2023–)
- Diocese of Christianoupolis: Prokopios Petridis (2010–)
- Diocese of Eleusis: Dorotheos Mourtsoukos (2009–)
- Diocese of Rentina: Vacant
- Diocese of Androusa: Constantios Panagiotakopoulos (2018–)
- Diocese of Epidaurus: Vacant
- Diocese of Oleni: Vacant

=== Metropolises and metropolitans of the New Lands ===
(under the jurisdiction of Constantinople until 1928, then under Athens; except the Dodecanese)

- Metropolis of Alexandroupolis: Anthimos (Christos) Koukouridis (2004–)
- Metropolis of Chios, Psara and Inousses and Exarchate of All Ionia: Markos Vasilakis (1965–)
- Metropolis of Didymoteichon and Orestias and Exarchate of Haemimontos: Damaskinos (Minas) Karpathakis (2009–)
- Metropolis of Drama: Dorotheos Paparis (2022–)
- Metropolis of Dryinoupolis, Pogoniani and Konitsa and Exarchate of Northern Epirus: Andreas Trebelas (1995–)
- Metropolis of Edessa, Pella and Almopia: Ioel (Panagiotis) Fragkakis (2002–)
- Metropolis of Elassona and Exarchate of Mount Olympus: Hariton Toumpas (2014–)
- Metropolis of Eleftheroupolis and Exarchate of Pangaeon: Chrysostomos (Ioannis) Avajianos (2004–)
- Metropolis of Florina, Prespes and Eordaia: Ireneus (Marios) Laftsis (2023–)
- Metropolis of Goumenissa, Axioupoli and Polykastro: Dimitrios Bekiaris-Mavrogonatos (1991–)
- Metropolis of Grevena: David Tzioumakas (2014–)
- Metropolis of Ierissos, Mount Athos and Ardameri: Theoklitos Athanasopoulos (2012–)
- Metropolis of Ioannina and Exarchate of Epirus: Maximos Papagiannis (2014–)
- Metropolis of Kassandria and Exarchate of All the Thermaic Gulf: Nikodemos (Konstantinos) Korakis (2001–)
- Metropolis of Kastoria and Exarchate of Upper Macedonia: Kallinikos Georgatos (2021–)
- Metropolis of Kitros, Katerini and Platamonas and Exarchate of Pieria: Georgios Chrysostomou (2014–)
- Metropolis of Langadas: Platon Krikris (2021–)
- Metropolis of Lemnos and Agios Efstratios and Exarchate of the North Aegean: Ierotheos Calogeropoulos (2019–)
- Metropolis of Maronia and Komotini and Exarchate of Rhodope: Panteleimon Moutafis (2013–)
- Metropolis of Mithymna: Chrysostomos (Kyriakos) Kalamatianos (1984–)
- Metropolis of Mytilini, Eresos and Plomari: Iakovos Frantzis (1988–)
- Metropolis of Neapolis and Stavroupolis: Varnavas (Markos) Tyris (2004–)
- Metropolis of Nea Krini and Kalamaria: Ioustinos Bardakas (2015–)
- Metropolis of Zichni and Nevrokopion: Ierotheos (Dimitrios) Tsoliakos (2003–)
- Metropolis of Nicopolis and Preveza and Exarchate of Old Epirus: Chrysostomos Tsirigkas (2012–)
- Metropolis of Paramythia, Filiates, Giromeri and Parga and Exarchate of Thesprotia: Serapion (Ioannis) Michalakis (2023–)
- Metropolis of Philippi, Neapolis and Thasos: Stefanos Tolios (2017–)
- Metropolis of Polyani and Kilkision: Bartholomew Antoniou-Triantafyllides (2021–)
- Metropolis of Samos and Ikaria: Eusebios (Evangelos) Pistolis (1995–)
- Metropolis of Serres and Nigrita: Theologos (Ioannis) Apostolidis (2003–)
- Metropolis of Servia and Kozani: Pavlos Papalexiou (2004–)
- Metropolis of Siderokastron: Makarios (Sotirios) Philotheou (2001–)
- Metropolis of Sisanion and Siatista: Athanasios Giannousas (2019–)
- Metropolis of Thessaloniki: Filotheos (Theocharis) Theocharis (2023–)
- Metropolis of Veria and Naousa: Panteleimon (Ioannis) Kalpakidis (1994–)
- Metropolis of Xanthi and Peritheorion and Exarchate of Western Thrace: Panteleimon (Michael) Kalaphatis (1995–)

== See also ==
- History of the Eastern Orthodox Church
- Interorthodox Centre of the Church of Greece
- List of archbishops of Athens
- National church
- Religion in Greece

== Bibliography ==
- Tomkinson, John L. (2004). Between Heaven and Earth: The Greek Church. Athens: Anagnosis. ISBN 9608718651.
- "Online Greek Orthodox Typikon". Archived from the original on 30 January 2018.
