= Tomos (disambiguation) =

Tomos may refer to:

- Tomos (Eastern Orthodox Church)
- Tomos, a former moped manufacturer from Slovenia
