= Tomos dated 29 June 1850 =

1850 decree by the Ecumenical Patriarchate

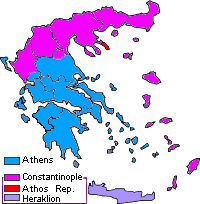
The religious jurisdictions of the Church of Greece (in blue) in Greece today.

The tomos dated 29 June 1850 is the official decree of the Ecumenical Patriarchate which gave de jure autocephaly to the then-de facto autocephalous Church of Greece.

== History ==
=== Declaration of autocephaly by Greece ===
The decision to create an independent Kingdom of Greece from the Three Great Powers (the British Empire, the Russian Empire and the Kingdom of France), finalized by the Treaty of Constantinople (1832), posed a dilemma for Greek patriarchal and religious society: whether there is an independent Church of Greece or in the independent state extends the ecclesiastical jurisdiction of the Ecumenical Patriarchate of Constantinople.

The government declared the Church of Greece to be autocephalous in 1833 in a political decision of the Bavarian regents acting for King Otto, who was a minor. The decision roiled Greek politics for decades as royal authorities took increasing control.

=== Signing of the tomos ===
In the end, the Ecumenical Patriarchate of Constantinople decided on a compromise: the Ecumenical Patriarchate agreed to give autocephaly to the Church of Greece through a tomos which was dated 29 June 1850.

=== Aftermath ===
The decision of the Ecumenical Patriarchate to give autocephaly to the Church of Greece catalyzed the Bulgarian National Revival and ultimately led to the Bulgarian schism after which ethnophyletism was condemned.

Mount Athos, Crete, Macedonia, Thrace, and the eastern Aegean Islands remained under the Ecumenical Patriarchate.

== See also ==
- National church
- Religion in Greece
