= Interorthodox Centre of the Church of Greece =

Greek Orthodox educational organisation

Coordinates: 38.052285°N 23.8676096°E

- Founded: 1969 (57 years ago)
- Founder: Archbishop of Athens Hieronymos I
- Purpose: Educational projects, international meetings
- Location: Penteli, Attica
- Region served: Greece
- Key people: Archbishop of Athens Hieronymos II, chairman

The Interorthodox Centre of the Church of Greece (Greek: Διορθόδοξο Κέντρο της Εκκλησίας της Ελλάδος, ΔΚΕΕ; DKEE) is the educational organisation and the convention centre of the Orthodox Church of Greece. It is located in the Holy Monastery of the Dormition of Virgin Mary in Penteli and it is about 15 km away from the centre of Athens.

== History ==
In 1969, the Holy Synod of the Church of Greece selected the Holy Monastery of the Dormition of Virgin Mary, in Penteli, as the most appropriate place to host the Interorthodox Centre. The centre's inauguration was celebrated in 1971 with festive events. During the years 2003-2004 the centre was fully renovated and further expanded.

It belongs to the Holy Synod of the Church of Greece and is chaired by the Archbishop of Athens and All Greece, Hieronymos II. The Director of the Interorthodox Centre is Metropolitan Ioannes of Thermopylae.

The centre has a lecture room, a library and accommodation facilities (rooms, apartments, kitchen and dining room).

== Activities ==
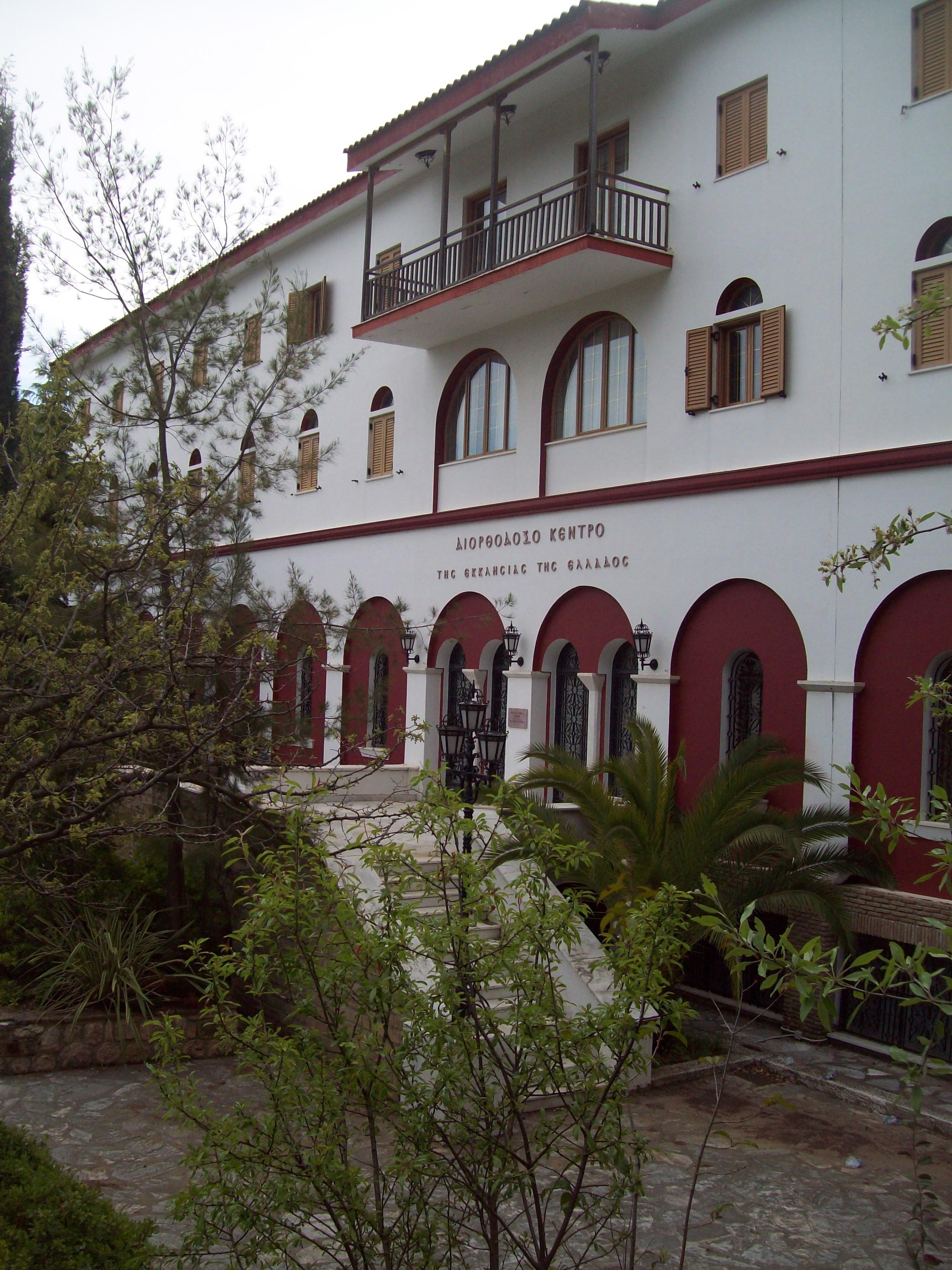
The Interorthodox Centre

The objectives of the Interorthodox Centre is to tighten in various ways the relations among Orthodox Churches throughout the world by organising and hosting dialogue meetings (conventions, symposiums, seminars, workshops, visits.) The Centre cultivates the mentality to deal with arousing issues concerning the contemporary multicultural social environment, through cooperation and dialogue with other orthodox and non-orthodox churches, other confessions and religious traditions.

In addition, since 2009 the Interorthodox Centre launched new activities under the auspices of the Greek Ministry of Education in the form of educational seminars and projects for teachers of primary and secondary schools.
