= Chrysostomos Savvatos =

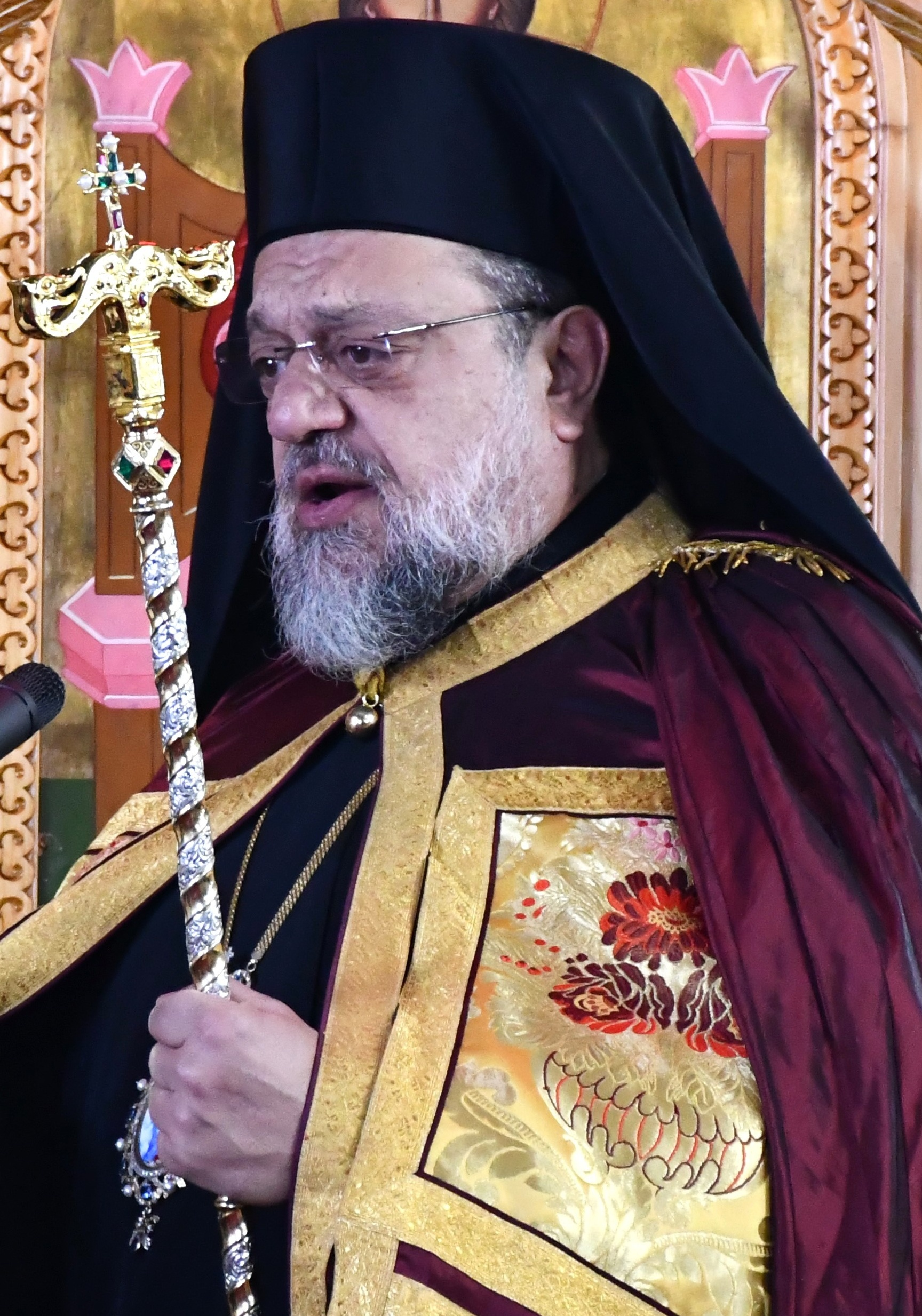
Chrysostomos Savvatos in October 2025

Chrysostomos Savvatos (Greek: Χρυσόστομος Σαββάτος), (born 1961) is a theologian in the Greek Orthodox Church and a professor in the Theology Faculty of the University of Athens. He has earned degrees from Rome and Strasbourg. In mid-2007 he was ordained as the metropolitan bishop of Messenia but continues also to fulfil the obligations of his university chair.

In 2008 he took part in the Ravenna conversation of the Orthodox-Roman Catholic Dialogue Commission, of which he is a member. In 2010, Metropolitan Chrysostomos criticised Metropolitan Seraphim of Peiraieus' hostility to Pope Benedict's visit to the Archbishop of Cyprus. On 8 October 2014, Metropolitan Chrysostomos, who is known for openness to dialogue, presented a document in Synod expressing the Church of Greece's reticence with regard to the forthcoming Panorthodox Council, in which allusion was made to the non-reception of World Council of Churches documents by the Church of Greece, avoidance of engaging in prayer within the WCC context, and by name five instances of deterioration or suspension of dialogue with major Christian groups of churches (notably raising the issue of Uniatism).
