= Uryadovy Kuryer =

Ukrainian state-owned newspaper

- Type: Daily newspaper
- Editor: Sergii Braga
- Founded: 1990; 36 years ago
- Language: Ukrainian
- Headquarters: Kyiv
- Website: Official website

Uryadovy Courier (Ukrainian: Урядовий кур'єр, lit. 'Governmental Courier') is the national daily newspaper published by the executive branch of Ukraine.

== History and profile ==
Founded in 1990, Uryadovy Courier is published in Ukrainian, and is consistently among the top three newspapers. The first editor-in-chief was Mykhailo M. Soroka. The current editor-in-chief of Uryadovy Courier is Sergii Braga. It caters to political and business readers, and is used as a source by Reuters and Bloomberg news agencies.

The Courier covers political, economic, cultural and sporting developments in Ukraine and around the world. However, the newspaper's principal focus is the work of the President and the Cabinet of Ministers of Ukraine. As an official publication, the Courier has exclusive first-hand information from government sources. Presidential and Ministerial decrees are published through the paper, as well as the most important laws passed by the Parliament of Ukraine.

In 1994, Courier had a circulation of 190,770 copies. It was 202,750 copies in 1995 and 175,296 copies in 1996. It became 153,624 copies in 1997 and 146,793 copies in 1998. The 1999 circulation of the paper was 128,256 copies.

== See also ==
- List of newspapers in Ukraine
- Visti, Soviet Ukrainian government gazette 1918–1941
