= Tomos (Eastern Orthodox Church) =

Decree by the head of an Eastern Orthodox church

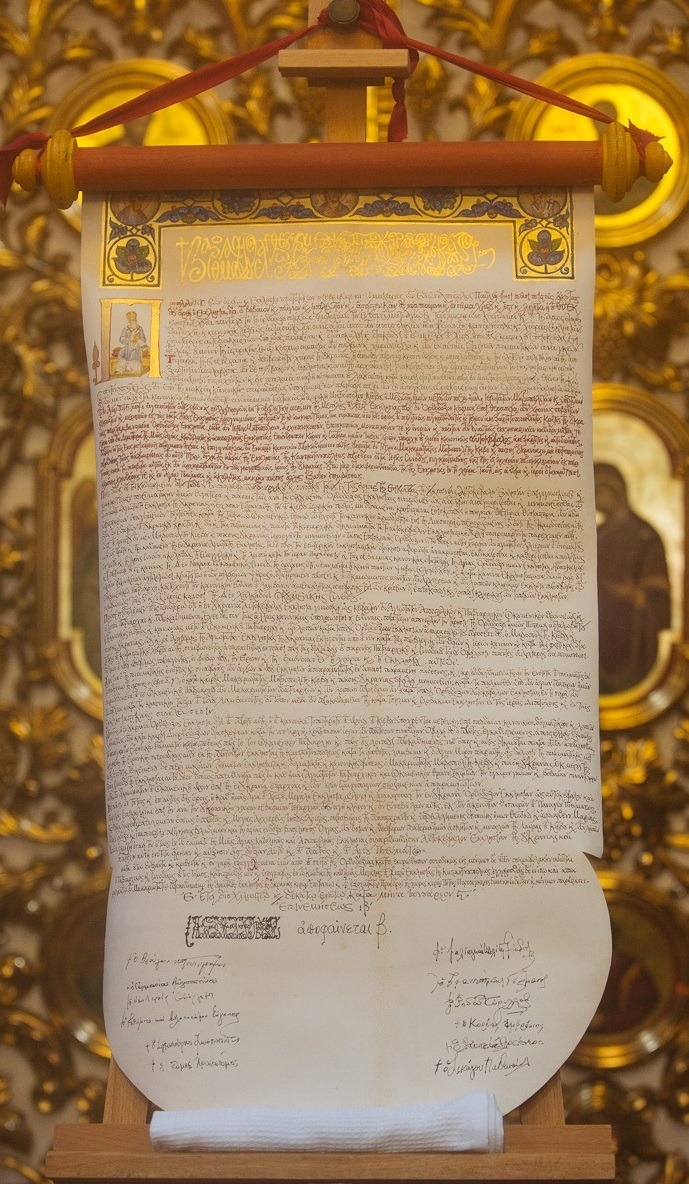
Tomos of autocephaly of the Orthodox Church of Ukraine, signed by the Ecumenical Patriarch Bartholomew I on 5 January 2019.

A tomos (Greek: τόμος, romanized: tomos, lit. 'section', 'part of', 'part which is cut') in the Eastern Orthodox Church is a decree of the head of a particular Eastern Orthodox church on certain matters (such as the level of dependence of an autonomous church from its mother church).

Tomos is a Greek word; it can be literally translated as 'a section'. "In the narrower meaning in Orthodox church terminology, a tomos is [...] a scroll or a small book, but one with a very specific purpose — it codifies a decision by a Holy Synod, or council of Orthodox bishops." The translation of the word tomos in English is document.

== See also ==
- Tomos of autocephaly of the Orthodox Church of Ukraine
- Tomos dated 29 June 1850
- Canon law of the Eastern Orthodox Church
