= List of bishops of the Orthodox Church of Ukraine =

This is the list of the bishops of the Ukrainian Church including current Orthodox Church of Ukraine and its direct predecessors the Ukrainian Autocephalous Orthodox Church and the Ukrainian Orthodox Church – Kyiv Patriarchate, as well as depicting the organization of the church.

For church and clergy associated with the Latin Church and descendant of the Ruthenian Uniate Church, see Ukrainian Greek Catholic Church.

== Current bishops ==
=== Ruling bishops ===
Each ruling bishop is put in charge of a subdivision of OCU called an eparchy. Ruling bishops can be awarded higher ranks of archbishop and metropolitan for their services to the Church. Every ruling bishop can be chosen to fill a seat in the Holy Synod of the OCU. Ruling bishops can partake in consecration of new bishops at their own will.

The Head of OCU is also among the ruling bishops, as the de jure head of the eparchy of Kyiv.

| Name | Rank | Title | Consecration | |
| Name | Rank | Title | Date | Lead consecrator |
|---|---|---|---|---|
| Epiphanius (Dumenko) | metropolitan | of Kyiv and all Ukraine | November 15, 2009 | Philaret (Denysenko) |
| Andrew (Abramchuk) | metropolitan | of Halychyna | April 7, 1990 | John (Bodnarchuk) |
| Romanus (Balashchuk) | metropolitan | of Vinnytsia and Bratslav | May 22, 1990 (Note: Reconsecrated on 16 September 1992 by Philaret (Denysenko).) | John (Bodnarchuk) |
| Volodymyr (Ladyka) | metropolitan | of Mykolaiv and Bohoiavlensk | March 13, 1993 | Philaret (Denysenko) |
| Hadrian (Starina) | metropolitan | of Bohorodsk (Note: Bohorodsk is the original name of the Russian city of Noginsk. As a bishopric outside of Ukraine, it should be transferred under the jurisdiction of Constantinople.) | February 6, 1994 | Volodymyr (Romaniuk) |
| Simon (Shostatsky) | metropolitan | of Vinnytsia and Bar | May 4, 1996 | Volodymyr (Sabodan) |
| Macarius (Maletych) | metropolitan | of Lviv | November 3, 1996 | Demetrios (Yarema) |
| Joasaph (Vasylykiv) | metropolitan | of Ivano-Frankivsk and Halych | April 6, 1997 | Philaret (Denysenko) |
| Demetrios (Rudiuk) | metropolitan | of Lviv and Sokal | July 16, 2000 | Philaret (Denysenko) |
| Clemence (Kushch) | metropolitan | of Simferopol and Crimea | July 23, 2000 | Philaret (Denysenko) |
| Michael (Zinkevych) | metropolitan | of Lutsk and Volhynia | October 22, 2000 | Philaret (Denysenko) |
| Sergius (Horobtsov) | metropolitan | of Donetsk and Mariupol | December 14, 2002 | Philaret (Denysenko) |
| John (Yaremenko) | metropolitan | of Cherkasy and Chyhyryn | March 30, 2003 | Philaret (Denysenko) |
| Nestor (Pysyk) | metropolitan | of Ternopil and Kremenets | March 5, 2006 | Philaret (Denysenko) |
| Theodore (Bubnyuk) | metropolitan | of Poltava and Kremenchuk | October 20, 2006 | Philaret (Denysenko) |
| Alexander (Drabynko) | metropolitan | of Pereyaslav and Vyshneve | December 19, 2007 | Volodymyr (Sabodan) |
| Hilarion (Protsyk) | metropolitan | of Rivne and Ostroh | May 14, 2008 | Philaret (Denysenko) |
| Eustratius (Zorya) | metropolitan | of Bila Tserkva | May 25, 2008 | Philaret (Denysenko) |
| Jacob (Makarchuk) | archbishop | of Drohobych and Sambir | November 8, 1998 | Demetrios (Yarema) |
| Methodius (Sribniak) | archbishop | of Sumy and Okhtyrka | June 6, 2004 | Philaret (Denysenko) |
| Lawrence (Myhovych) | archbishop | of Luhansk and Starobilsk | December 13, 2004 | Methodius (Kudriakov) |
| Onuphrius (Khavruk) | archbishop | of Chernivtsi and Kitsman | October 30, 2005 | Philaret (Denysenko) |
| Michael (Bondarchuk) | archbishop | of Vinnytsia and Tulchyn | January 1, 2006 | Philaret (Denysenko) |
| Matthew (Shevchuk) | archbishop | of Volodymyr and Novovolynsk | December 17, 2006 | Philaret (Denysenko) |
| Mark (Levkiv) | archbishop | of Kropyvnytskyi and Holovanivsk | February 1, 2009 | Philaret (Denysenko) |
| Volodymyr (Shlapak) | archbishop | of Zhytomyr and Polisia | June 21, 2009 | Methodius (Kudriakov) |
| Athanasius (Shkurupii) | archbishop | of Kharkiv and Izium | November 15, 2009 | Methodius (Kudriakov) |
| Herman (Semanchuk) | archbishop | of Chernivtsi and Khotyn | November 16, 2009 | Methodius (Kudriakov) |
| Simon (Zinkevych) | archbishop | of Dnipro and lands of The Sich | November 21, 2009 | Philaret (Denysenko) |
| Tycho (Petraniuk) | archbishop | of Ternopil and Buchach | November 22, 2009 | Philaret (Denysenko) |
| Athanasius (Yavorskyi) | archbishop | of Odesa and Balta | August 21, 2011 | Philaret (Denysenko) |
| Metrophanes (Butynskyi) | archbishop | of Kharkiv and Sloboda lands | August 25, 2013 | Philaret (Denysenko) |
| Cyril (Mykhailiuk) | bishop | of Uzhhorod and Khust | August 3, 2003 | Philaret (Denysenko) |
| Paul (Kravchuk) | bishop | of Ternopil and Terebovlia | March 29, 2009 | Philaret (Denysenko) |
| Julian (Hatala) | bishop | of Kolomyia and Kosiv | February 19, 2012 | Philaret (Denysenko) |
| Photius (Davydenko) | bishop | of Zaporizhia and Melitopol | December 17, 2014 | Philaret (Denysenko) |
| Barsanuphius (Rudnik) | bishop | of Uzhhorod and Transcarpathia | January 25, 2015 | Philaret (Denysenko) |
| Viktor (Bed) | bishop | of Mukachevo and Carpathians | August 14, 2015 | Macarius (Maletych) |
| Boris (Kharko) | bishop | of Kherson and Kakhovka | August 23, 2015 | Macarius (Maletych) |
| Paisius (Kukharchuk) | bishop | of Zhytomyr and Ovruch | January 29, 2017 | Philaret (Denysenko) |
| Sabbas (Fryziuk) | bishop | of Donetsk and Sloviansk | May 14, 2017 | Macarius (Maletych) |
| Paul (Yurystyi) | bishop | of Khmelnytskyi and Kamianets-Podilsky | January 28, 2018 | Philaret (Denysenko) |
| Gabriel (Kryzyna) | bishop | of Rivne and Sarny | September 2, 2018 | Macarius (Maletych) |
| Nicodemus (Kulyhin) | bishop | of Kherson and Taurida | December 4, 2019 | Epiphanius (Dumenko) |
| Anthony (Firley) | bishop | of Chernihiv and Nizhyn | June 2, 2022 | Epiphanius (Dumenko) |

=== Vicar bishops ===
Vicar bishops serve as helpers to the ruling bishop of their eparchy. Vicar bishops cannot be awarded a higher rank, except if they were made an archbishop before becoming a vicar in the OCU, usually by being a ruling bishop of the OCU or another Orthodox Church (metropolitans cannot become vicars). Vicar bishops cannot be chosen to fill a seat in the Holy Synod of the OCU (with one exception). All vicar bishops can partake in the consecration of new bishops at will.

The archbishop of Vyshhorod is a special case among the vicar bishops. As the de facto ruling bishop of the eparchy of Kyiv, he is officially equated in rights but not in name to a ruling bishop, and can be chosen to be a part of the Holy Synod. He is also awarded the title of archbishop immediately upon taking office.

| Name | Rank | Title | Eparchy | Consecration | |
| Name | Rank | Title | Eparchy | Date | Lead consecrator |
|---|---|---|---|---|---|
| Alexander (Reshetniak) | archbishop | of Yahotyn | Kyiv | January 16, 1994 | Volodymyr (Romaniuk) |
| Iziaslav (Karha) | archbishop | of Makariv | Kyiv | September 11, 1994 | Volodymyr (Romaniuk) |
| Agapetus (Humeniuk) (Note: equated to ruling) | archbishop | of Vyshhorod | Kyiv | August 8, 2010 | Philaret (Denysenko) |
| Pancras (Matviyevskyi) | bishop | of Sloviansk | Donetsk | March 28, 2003 | Philaret (Denysenko) |
| John (Shvets) | bishop | of Bilhorod | Kyiv | October 29, 2010 | Methodius (Kudriakov) |
| Volodymyr (Cherpak) | bishop | of Fastiv | Kyiv | November 16, 2010 | Methodius (Kudriakov) |
| Paul (Mysak) | bishop | of Kolomyia | Ivano-Frankivsk | February 15, 2018 | Macarius (Maletych) |
| Epiphanius (Dimitriou) | bishop | of Olbia | Kyiv | May 26, 2019 | Epiphanius (Dumenko) |
| Theognostus (Bodoryak) | bishop | of Bohorodchany | Ivano-Frankivsk and Halych | February 13, 2022 | Epiphanius (Dumenko) |
| Ephrem (Khomiak) | bishop | of Vasylkiv | Kyiv | February 26, 2023 | Epiphanius (Dumenko) |

=== Titular bishops ===
Titular bishops have the duties normally assigned to a priest in the eparchy, but unlike priests, they answer directly to the Head of the Church and the Holy Synod, bypassing the ruling bishop. Titular bishops cannot be chosen to fill a seat in the Holy Synod, but can partake in the consecration of new bishops at their own will. Before the 2018 unification, such bishops were known as bishop-priests within the Ukrainian Orthodox Church - Kyivan Patriarchate.

| Name | Rank | Title | Consecration | |
| Name | Rank | Title | Date | Lead consecrator |
|---|---|---|---|---|
| Mark (Hrynchevskyi) | bishop | of Dunayivtsi | December 17, 2009 | Philaret (Denysenko) |
| Gerontius (Olianskyi) | bishop | of Boyarka | September 14, 2014 | Methodius (Kudriakov) |

=== Retired bishops ===
Retired bishops are freed of their episcopal duties by the Holy Synod. They can partake in consecration of a new bishop, but only with a permission from the Head of the Church.

| Name | Rank | Title | Consecration | |
| Name | Rank | Title | Date | Lead consecrator |
|---|---|---|---|---|
| Daniel (Kovalchuk) | metropolitan | formerly of Chernivtsi and Bukovyna | April 28, 1990 (Note: Reconsecrated on 16 December 1992 by Anthony (Masendych) and Sophronius (Vlasov).) | John (Bodnarchuk) |
| Damian (Zamarayev) | archbishop | formerly of Kherson and Taurida | October 19, 1997 | Philaret (Denysenko) |
| Hadrian (Kulyk) | bishop | formerly titular of Shepetivka | February 16, 2011 | Methodius (Kudriakov) |

== Former bishops ==
=== Died ===
- Philaret (Denysenko), formerely patriarch of Kyiv and the all Rus'-Ukraine (consecrated on 4 Febaruary 1962 by Poemen (Izvekov), died on 20 March 2026)
- Job (Pavlyshyn), formerly the archbishop of Ternopil and Kremenets (consecrated on 11 May 1995, retired in 2015, died 8 February 2019)
- John (Boichuk), formerly the bishop of Kolomyia and Kosiv (consecrated on 7 July 1996, retired on 8 March 2013, died 2 November 2020)
- Anthony (Makhota), metropolitan of Khmelnytskyi and Kamianets-Podilsky (consecrated on 21 July 1996, died in office on 23 March 2021)
- Michael (Laroche), metropolitan of Korsun (consecrated on 12 May 1996, died in office on 14 April 2022)

=== Defrocked ===
- Joasaph (Shibaev), metropolitan of Belgorod and Oboyansk (consecrated on February 19, 1995, excommunicated on June 24, 2019)
- Peter (Moskalyov), bishop of Valuiki (consecrated on December 13, 2008, excommunicated on June 24, 2019)
- Philaret (Pancu), bishop of Bilhorod-Dnistrovskyi (consecrated on July 31, 2005, excommunicated on July 20, 2020)

== Bishops of the Ukrainian Autocephalous Orthodox Church ==
The church revival in Ukraine has started on efforts of bishop of the Ukrainian Exarchate Ioan (Bodnarchuk) in 1989-90. In April 1992 Ioan (Bodnarchuk) was banned from the church. In June 1992 most of bishops joined the Ukrainian Orthodox Church – Kyiv Patriarchate (UOC-KP) as part of the first unification attempt, while only Bishop of Chernivtsi Danyil did not rush with his decision. Patriarch Mstyslav excommunicated Metropolitan Antoniy and Archbishop Romaniuk who joined the unification with Metropolitan Filaret. In December 1992 Bishop Danyil finally joined UOC-KP, while at the same time Archbishop of Lviv Petro decided to stay as part of the original Ukrainian Autocephalous Orthodox Church (UAOC).

- Andriy (Abramchuk) (returned from UOC-KP (1995) as Metropolitan of Ivano-Frankivsk and Galicia (1995–2018), joined Orthodox Church of Ukraine)
- Roman (Balashchuk) (returned from UOC-KP (1995) as Archbishop/Metropolitan of Vinnytsia and Bratslav (1995–2018), joined Orthodox Church of Ukraine)
- Macarius (Maletych) (1996 by Dymytriy (Yarema) as Bishop/Archbishop/Metropolitan of Lviv (1996–2018), Metropolitan of Kyiv and all Ukraine (2015–2018), joined Orthodox Church of Ukraine)
- Volodymyr (Shlapak) (2009 by Methodius (Kudriakov) as Bishop/Archbishop of Zhytomyr and Polesie (2009–2015/2015–2018), joined Orthodox Church of Ukraine)
- Afanasiy (Shkurupiy) (2009 by Methodius (Kudriakov) as Bishop/Archbishop of Kharkiv and Poltava (2009–2018), joined Orthodox Church of Ukraine)
- Herman (Semanchuk) (2009 by Methodius (Kudriakov) as Bishop/Archbishop of Chernivtsi and Khotyn (2009–2018), joined Orthodox Church of Ukraine)
- Volodymyr (Cherpak) (2010 by Methodius (Kudriakov) as vicar Bishop of Vyshhorod and Podil (2010–2018), joined Orthodox Church of Ukraine)
- Iov (Pavlyshyn) (came from UOC-KP (2012) as Archbishop of Ternopil and Kremenets (2012–2015), retired (2015–2018), joined Orthodox Church of Ukraine)
- Herontiy (Orlyansky) (2014 by Methodius (Kudriakov) as vicar Bishop of Drohobych (2014–2018), vicar Bishop of Boryspil (2018), joined Orthodox Church of Ukraine)
- Kyrylo (Mykhailyuk) (came from UOC-KP (2014) as Bishop of Uzhhorod and Trans-Carpathian (2014–2018), joined Orthodox Church of Ukraine)
- Viktor (Begy) (2015 by Macarius (Maletych) as Bishop of Mukachevo and Carpathian (2015–2018), joined Orthodox Church of Ukraine)
- Borys (Kharko) (2015 by Macarius (Maletych) as Bishop of Kherson and Mykolaiv (2015–2018), joined Orthodox Church of Ukraine)
- Tykhon (Petranyuk) (came from UOC-KP (2017) as Bishop of Odesa and Black Sea (2017), Archbishop of Ternopil (2017–2018), joined Orthodox Church of Ukraine)
- Savva (Fryziuk) (2017 by Macarius (Maletych) as Bishop of Donetsk and Sloviansk (2017–2018), joined Orthodox Church of Ukraine)
- Pavlo (Mysak) (2018 by Macarius (Maletych) as vicar Bishop of Kolomyia (2018), joined Orthodox Church of Ukraine)
- Havryil (Kryzyna) (2018 by Macarius (Maletych) as Bishop of Rivne and Volhynia (2018), joined Orthodox Church of Ukraine)

== Former Bishops of the Ukrainian Autocephalous Orthodox Church ==
=== Left the Church for UOC – KP before 2018 ===
- Vasyl (Bodnarchuk) (1990 by Ioan (Bodnarchuk) as Bishop/Archbishop of Ternopil and Buchach (1990–1992), joined UOC-KP)
- Andriy (Abramchuk) (1990 by Ioan (Bodnarchuk) as Bishop/Archbishop of Ivano-Frankivsk and Kolomyia (1990–1992), Metropolitan of Ivano-Frankivsk and Galicia (1992), joined UOC-KP)
- Danyil (Kovalchuk) (1990 by Ioan (Bodnarchuk) as Bishop of Chernivtsi and Bukovyna (1990–1992), joined UOC-KP)
- Polikarp (Pakholiuk) (1991 by Mstyslav (Skrypnyk) as Vicar Bishop of Ovruch (1991–1992), joined UOC-KP)
- Petro (Petrus) (1992 by Antoniy (Masendych) as Bishop/Archbishop of Lviv and Sokal (1992), joined UOC-KP)
- Roman (Popenko) (1992 by Antoniy (Masendych) as Bishop of Mykolaiv and Poltava (1992), joined UOC-KP)
- Mykhail (Dutkevych) (1992 by Antoniy (Masendych) as Bishop of Bila Tserkva and Uman (1992), joined UOC-KP)
- Petro (Petrus) (returned from UOC-KP (1992) as Archbishop/Metropolitan of Lviv and Sokal (1992–1996), retired (1996–1997), joined UOC-KP)
- Ioan (Modzalevsky) (1996 by Roman (Balashchuk) as Bishop/Archbishop of Moscow and Kolomna (1996–1999), vicar Archbishop of Kremenets (1999–2001), Archbishop of Kherson and Crimea (2001–2007), vicar Archbishop of Uman (2007–2013), joined UOC-KP)
- Ioan (Boychuk) (1996 by Andriy (Abramchuk) as Bishop of Rivne and Ostroh (1996), Bishop of Zhytomyr and Ovruch (1996–1997), joined UOC-KP)
- Yakiv (Makarchuk) (1998 by Dymytriy (Yarema) as Bishop of Cherkasy and Kirovohrad (1998–2004), joined UOC-KP)
- Lavrentiy (Myhovych) (2004 by Methodius (Kudriakov) as Bishop of Poltava and Myrhorod (2004–2005), joined UOC-KP)
- Mykhail (Bondarchuk) (came from UOC-KP (2006) as vicar Bishop of Fastiv (2006–2011), joined UOC-KP)
- Ioan (Shvets) (2010 by Methodius (Kudriakov) as vicar Bishop of Svyatoshyno (2010–2011), Bishop of Lviv and Sambir (2011–2013), joined UOC-KP)
- Adrian (Kulyk) (2011 by Methodius (Kudriakov) as Bishop of Khmelnytskyi and Kamianets-Podilskyi (2011–2013), joined UOC-KP)

=== Left the Church for the Moscow Patriarchate and others ===
- Mykola (Hrokh) (1990 by Ioan (Bodnarchuk) as Bishop of Lutsk and Volhynia (1990–1992), joined UOC-MP)
- Antoniy (Fialko) (1991 by Mstyslav (Skrypnyk) as Bishop of Khmelnytskyi and Kamianets-Podilskyi (1991–1992), joined UOC-MP)
- Panteleimon (Romanovsky) (1991 by Antoniy (Masendych) as Bishop of Mykolaiv and Kherson (1991–1992), Bishop of Vinnytsia and Kirovohrad (1992), joined UOC-MP)

=== Died ===
- Mstyslav (Skrypnyk) (1942 by Nikanor (Abramovych) as Bishop of Pereyaslav (Ukrainian Autocephalous Orthodox Church, 1942), Bishop in Germany (1944–1946), Metropolitan of the Ukrainian Orthodox Church of Canada (1947–1950), Head of Consistory of the Ukrainian Orthodox Church of the USA (1950–1971), Metropolitan of the Ukrainian Orthodox Church of the USA (1971–1993), Metropolitan of the Ukrainian Autocephalous Orthodox Church in diaspora (1969–1993), Patriarch of Kyiv and all Ukraine (1990–1993), died)
- Dymytriy (Yarema) (1993 by Petro (Petrus) as Bishop of Pereyaslav and Sicheslav (1993), Patriarch of Kyiv and all Ukraine (1993–2000), died)
- Petro (Brook de Traal) (1996 by Methodius (Kudriakov) as Bishop/Archbishop of Kaffa and Gothia (1996–2011), died)
- Feodosiy (Petsyna) (came from UOC-KP (2007) as Archbishop of Drohobych and Sambir (2007–2010), died)
- Methodius (Kudriakov) (1995 by Volodymyr (Romaniuk) as Bishop of Khmelnytskyi and Kamianets-Podilskyi (UOC-KP, 1995), Archbishop/Metropolitan of Ternopil and Podolia (UAOC, 1997–2015), Primate of UAOC (2000–2015), Metropolitan of Kyiv and all Ukraine (2002–2015), died)
- Ilarion (Savchuk) (2005 by Methodius (Kudriakov) as Bishop of Cherkasy and Kirovohrad (2005–2015), died)

=== Excommunicated ===
- Ioan (Bodnarchuk) (1977 by Filaret (Denysenko) as Bishop of Zhytomyr and Ovruch (Ukrainian Exarchate, 1977–1989), Archbishop/Metropolitan of Lviv and Galicia (1989–1992), Metropolitan of Zhytomyr and Ovruch (1992), excommunicated)
- Volodymyr (Romaniuk) (1990 by Ioan (Bodnarchuk) as Bishop of Uzhhorod and Vynohradiv (1990), Vicar Archbishop of Bila Tserkva (1990–1991), Vicar Archbishop of Vyshhorod (1991–1992), excommunicated)
- Roman (Balashchuk) (1990 by Ioan (Bodnarchuk) as Bishop/Archbishop of Chernihiv and Sumy (1990–1992), joined UOC-KP (?excommunicated))
- Antoniy (Masendych) (1990 by Ioan (Bodnarchuk) as Bishop/Archbishop of Rivne and Zhytomyr (1990–1992), Metropolitan of Pereyaslav and Sicheslav (1992), excommunicated)
- Sofroniy (Vlasov) (1992 by Antoniy (Masendych) as Bishop of Vinnytsia and Kirovohrad (1992), Bishop of Zhytomyr and Ovruch (1992), joined UOC-KP (?excommunicated))
- Mykhail (Dutkevych) (returned (1993) as Bishop of Bila Tserkva and Uman (1993–2001), created Ukrainian Apostolate Orthodox Church)
- Feoktist (Peresada) (1993 by Petro (Petrus) as Bishop/Archbishop of Lutsk and Volhynia (1993–1997), retired (1997–2001), joined Ukrainian Apostolate Orthodox Church)
- Ihor (Isichenko) (1993 by Petro (Petrus) as Bishop/Archbishop of Kharkiv and Poltava (1993–2003), created separate organization within own eparchy)
- Mstyslav (Huk) (2010 by Methodius (Kudriakov) as vicar Bishop of Ternopil and Chervonohrad (2010–2015), Archbishop of Ternopil (2015–2016), Archbishop of Khmelnytskyi and Kamianets-Podilskyi (2016–2017), banned)

== Bishops of the Ukrainian Orthodox Church ==
- Filaret (Denysenko) (joined (1992) as Metropolitan/Patriarch of Kyiv (1992–2018), joined Orthodox Church of Ukraine)
- Danyil (Kovalchuk) (joined (1992) as Bishop/Archbishop/Metropolitan of Chernivtsi and Bukovyna (1992–2018), joined Orthodox Church of Ukraine)
- Volodymyr (Ladyka) (1993 by Filaret (Denysenko) as Bishop of Vinnytsia and Bratslav (1993), Bishop/Archbishop/Metropolitan of Mykolaiv and Bohoyavlensky (1993–2018), joined Orthodox Church of Ukraine)
- Oleksandr (Reshetniak) (1994 by Volodymyr (Romaniuk) as vicar Bishop/Archbishop of Bila Tserkva (1994–2013), vicar Archbishop of Bohuslav (2013–2018), joined Orthodox Church of Ukraine)
- Adrian (Staryna) (1994 by Filaret (Denysenko) as Bishop/Archbishop/Metropolitan of Dnipropetrovsk and Kryvyi Rih (1994–2009), Bishop/Archbishop/Metropolitan of Bohorodsk (1994–2018), Metropolitan of Kryvyi Rih and Nikopol (2009–2011), joined Orthodox Church of Ukraine)
- Izyaslav (Karha) (1994 by Filaret (Denysenko) as vicar Bishop of Nikopol (1994–1995), Bishop of Donetsk and Luhansk (1995–1996), Bishop/Archbishop of Zhytomyr and Ovruch (1996–2017), vicar Archbishop of Makariv (2017–2018), joined Orthodox Church of Ukraine)
- Ioasaf (Shybayev) (1995 by Filaret (Denysenko) as Bishop/Archbishop/Metropolitan of Bilhorod and Oboyan (1995–2018), Exarch of Russia (2017–2018), joined Orthodox Church of Ukraine)
- Michel (Larouche) (came from Holy Synod of Milan (1996) as Bishop of Lyon (1996–1998), Metropolitan of Paris (1998–2018), joined Orthodox Church of Ukraine)
- Antoniy (Makhota) (1996 by Filaret (Denysenko) as Bishop of Simferopol and Crimea (1996–1997), Bishop/Archbishop/Metropolitan of Khmelnytskyi and Kamianets-Podilskyi (1997–2018), joined Orthodox Church of Ukraine)
- Ioasaf (Vasylykiv) (1997 by Filaret (Denysenko) as Bishop of Donetsk and Luhansk (1997), Bishop/Archbishop/Metropolitan of Ivano-Frankivsk and Galicia (1997–2018), joined Orthodox Church of Ukraine)
- Damian (Zamarayev) (1997 by Filaret (Denysenko) as Bishop/Archbishop of Kherson and Tavria (1997–2018), joined Orthodox Church of Ukraine)
- Ioan (Boychuk) (came from UAOC (1997) as Bishop of Kolomyia and Kosiv (1997–2013), retired (2013–2018), admitted to Orthodox Church of Ukraine)
- Dmytro (Rudiuk) (2000 by Filaret (Denysenko) as vicar Bishop/Archbishop/Metropolitan of Pereyaslav-Khmelnytskyi (2000–2010), Metropolitan of Lviv and Sokal (2010–2018), joined Orthodox Church of Ukraine)
- Klyment (Kushch) (2000 by Filaret (Denysenko) as Bishop/Archbishop/Metropolitan of Simferopol and Crimea (2000–2018), joined Orthodox Church of Ukraine)
- Mykhail (Zinkevych) (2000 by Filaret (Denysenko) as Bishop of Sumy and Okhtyrka (2000–2002), Bishop of Chernihiv and Nizhyn (2002–2004), Bishop/Archbishop/Metropolitan of Lutsk and Volhynia (2004–2018), joined Orthodox Church of Ukraine)
- Sergi (Horobtsov) (2002 by Filaret (Denysenko) as vicar Bishop of Sloviansk (2002–2008), Bishop/Archbishop/Metropolitan of Donetsk and Mariupol (2008–2018), joined Orthodox Church of Ukraine)
- Vsevolod (Matvievsky) (2003 by Filaret (Denysenko) as Bishop of Luhansk and Starobilsk (2003–2009), vicar Bishop of Sloviansk (2009–2018), joined Orthodox Church of Ukraine)
- Ioan (Yaremenko) (2003 by Filaret (Denysenko) as Bishop/Archbishop/Metropolitan of Cherkasy and Chyhyryn (2003–2018), joined Orthodox Church of Ukraine)
- Mefodiy (Sribnyak) (2004 by Filaret (Denysenko) as Bishop/Archbishop of Sumy and Okhtyrka (2004–2018), joined Orthodox Church of Ukraine)
- Filaret (Pancu) (2005 by Filaret (Denysenko) as Bishop/Archbishop of Fălești and East Moldova (2005–2018), joined Orthodox Church of Ukraine)
- Onufriy (Khavruk) (2005 by Filaret (Denysenko) as vicar Bishop of Derman (2005–2006), Bishop/Archbishop of Vinnytsia and Bratslav (2006–2013), Archbishop of Chernivtsi and Kitsman (2013–2018), joined Orthodox Church of Ukraine)
- Nestor (Pysyk) (2006 by Filaret (Denysenko) as Bishop/Archbishop of Ternopil and Kremenets (2006–2018), joined Orthodox Church of Ukraine)
- Fedir (Bubniuk) (2006 by Filaret (Denysenko) as Bishop/Archbishop of Poltava and Kremenchuk (2006–2018), joined Orthodox Church of Ukraine)
- Matfei (Shevchuk) (2006 by Filaret (Denysenko) as Bishop of Drohobych and Sambir (2006–2012), vicar Bishop of Volodymyr-Volynskyi (2012–2017), Bishop of Volodymyr and Turiysk (2017–2018), joined Orthodox Church of Ukraine)
- Ilarion (Protsyk) (2008 by Filaret (Denysenko) as Bishop of Chernihiv and Nizhyn (2008–2012), Archbishop of Rivne and Ostroh (2012–2018), joined Orthodox Church of Ukraine)
- Evstratiy (Zoria) (2008 by Filaret (Denysenko) as vicar Bishop of Vasylkiv (2008–2011), vicar Bishop of Bohuslav (2011–2012), Archbishop of Chernihiv and Nizhyn (2012–2018), joined Orthodox Church of Ukraine)
- Petro (Moskalyov) (2008 by Filaret (Denysenko) as vicar Bishop of Valuiky (2008–2018), joined Orthodox Church of Ukraine)
- Mark (Levkiv) (2009 by Filaret (Denysenko) as Bishop of Kropyvnytskyi and Holovanivsk (2009–2018), joined Orthodox Church of Ukraine)
- Pavlo (Kravchuk) (2009 by Filaret (Denysenko) as Bishop of Ternopil and Terebovlia (2009–2018), joined Orthodox Church of Ukraine)
- Epifaniy (Dumenko) (2009 by Filaret (Denysenko) as vicar Bishop of Vyshhorod (2009–2010), Bishop/Archbishop/Metropolitan of Pereyaslav and Bila Tserkva (2010–2018), vicar Patriarch (2013–2018), joined Orthodox Church of Ukraine)
- Symeon (Zinkevych) (2009 by Filaret (Denysenko) as Bishop/Archbishop of Dnipro and Kryvyi Rih (2009–2018), joined Orthodox Church of Ukraine)
- Mark (Hrynchevsky) (2009 by Filaret (Denysenko) as Bishop of Chernivtsi and Kitsman (2009–2013), Bishop of Odesa and Balta (2013–2018), Bishop-Paroch of Church of the Nativity of Christ (2018), joined Orthodox Church of Ukraine)
- Ahapit (Humeniuk) (2010 by Filaret (Denysenko) as vicar Bishop/Archbishop of Vyshhorod (2010–2018), joined Orthodox Church of Ukraine)
- Afanasiy (Yavorsky) (2011 by Filaret (Denysenko) as vicar Bishop of Konotop (2011–2013), Bishop of Luhansk and Starobilsk (2013–2018), joined Orthodox Church of Ukraine)
- Mykhail (Bondarchuk) (returned from UAOC (2011) as vicar Bishop of Dubno (2011–2012), Bishop of Drohobych and Sambir (2012–2013), Bishop/Archbishop of Vinnytsia and Bratslav (2013–2018), joined Orthodox Church of Ukraine)
- Yulian (Hatala) (2012 by Filaret (Denysenko) as vicar Bishop of Horodok (2012–2013), Bishop of Kolomyia and Kosiv (2013–2018), joined Orthodox Church of Ukraine)
- Mytrofan (Butynsky) (2013 by Filaret (Denysenko) as Bishop of Kharkiv and Bohodukhiv (2013–2018), joined Orthodox Church of Ukraine)
- Ioan (Shvets) (came from UAOC (2013) as Bishop-Paroch of Nativity of the Blessed Virgin Mary (2013–2018), joined Orthodox Church of Ukraine)
- Adrian (Kulyk) (came from UAOC (2013) as Bishop-Paroch of St. Great Martyr George the Victorious (2013–2018), joined Orthodox Church of Ukraine)
- Fotiy (Davydenko) (2014 by Filaret (Denysenko) as Bishop of Zaporizhia and Melitopol (2014–2018), joined Orthodox Church of Ukraine)
- Vorsonofiy (Rudnik) (2015 by Filaret (Denysenko) as Bishop of Uzhhorod and Trans-Carpathian (2015–2018), joined Orthodox Church of Ukraine)
- Paisiy (Kukharchuk) (2017 by Filaret (Denysenko) as Bishop of Zhytomyr and Ovruch (2017–2018), joined Orthodox Church of Ukraine)
- Pavlo (Yurysty) (2018 by Filaret (Denysenko) as Bishop of Odesa and Balta (2018), joined Orthodox Church of Ukraine)

== Former Bishops of the Ukrainian Orthodox Church – KP ==
=== Left the Church for UAOC before 2018 ===
- Andriy (Abramchuk) (joined (1992) as Metropolitan of Ivano-Frankivsk and Galicia (1992–1995), joined UAOC)
- Petro (Petrus) (joined (1992) as Archbishop of Lviv and Sokal (1992), joined UAOC)
- Mykhail (Dutkevych) (joined (1992) as Bishop of Bila Tserkva and Uman (1992–1993), joined UAOC)
- Roman (Balashchuk) (1992 by Filaret (Denysenko) as Bishop of Rivne and Ostroh (1992–1995), joined UAOC)
- Feodosiy (Petsyna) (1994 by Volodymyr (Romaniuk) as Bishop/Archbishop of Drohobych and Sambir (1994–2006), retired/disciplinary (2006–2007), joined UAOC)
- Kyrylo (Mykhailiuk) (2003 by Filaret (Denysenko) as Bishop of Uzhhorod and Trans-Carpathian (2003–2014), joined UAOC)
- Mykhail (Bondarchuk) (2006 by Filaret (Denysenko) as Bishop of Poltava and Kremenchuk (2006), joined UAOC)
- Tykhon (Petraniuk) (2009 by Filaret (Denysenko) as Bishop of Luhansk and Starobilsk (2009–2010), retired/disciplinary, joined UAOC)

=== Left the Church for Moscow Patriarchate or others ===
- Roman (Popenko) (joined (1992) as Bishop of Mykolaiv and Poltava (1992–1994), joined UOC-MP)
- Spyrydon (Babskyi) (1992 by Filaret (Denysenko) as vicar Bishop of Pereyaslav-Khmelnytskyi (1992), Bishop of Lutsk and Volhynia (1992), Bishop of Dnipropetrovsk and Zaporizhia (1992–1993), Bishop of Vinnytsia and Bratslav (1993), joined UOC-MP)
- Varsonofiy (Mazurak) (1992 by Filaret (Denysenko) as Bishop of Ivano-Frankivsk and Kolomyia (1992), Bishop of Mykolaiv (1992–1993), joined UOC-MP)
- Antoniy (Masendych) (1992 by Filaret (Denysenko) as Bishop/Metropolitan of Pereyaslav and Sicheslav (1992–1994), joined UOC-MP)
- Sofroniy (Vlasov) (1992 by Filaret (Denysenko) as Bishop of Vinnytsia and Bratslav (1992–1994), joined UOC-MP)
- Ioann (Siopko) (1993 as vicar Bishop of Yahotyn (1993–1994), joined UOC-MP)
- Ioann (Zynovyev) (1996 by Filaret (Denysenko) as Bishop of Donetsk and Luhansk (1996–1997), Bishop of Poltava and Kremenchuk (1997), vicar Bishop of Bohuslav (1998), Bishop/Archbishop of Odesa and Balta (1998–2001), retired (2001–2003), joined Russian Orthodox Church Outside of Russia)

=== Died ===
- Avhustyn (Kravchenko) (joined (1992) as vicar Bishop of Yahotyn (1992–1993), retired (1993), died)
- Polikarp (Huts) (1993 by Filaret (Denysenko) as Bishop of Donetsk and Luhansk (1993), died)
- Oleksiy (Tsaruk) (1993 by Filaret (Denysenko) as Bishop of Kherson and Mykolaiv (1993), retired (1993–1994), died)
- Ioan (Bodnarchuk) (admitted (1993) as Metropolitan of Lutsk and Volhynia (1993–1994), died)
- Volodymyr (Romaniuk) (1992 by Filaret (Denysenko) as vicar Bishop of Bila Tserkva (1993), Archbishop of Lviv and Sokal (1993), Archbishop of Cherkasy and Sumy (1993), Patriarch of Kyiv and all Ukraine (1993–1995), died)
- Nykon (Kalember) (1997 by Filaret (Denysenko) as Bishop of Kitsman and Zastavne (1997–1999), Bishop of Chernihiv and Nizhyn (1999–2002), died)
- Yakiv (Panchuk) (joined (1992) as vicar Bishop of Pochaiv (1992), Archbishop of Ternopil and Kremenets (1992–1995), Archbishop of Lutsk and Volhynia (1995–2004), died)
- Tymofiy (Kutalyanos) (2000 by Filaret (Denysenko) as Metropolitan of Korsun (2000–2004), Exarch in Greece (1996–2004), died)
- Danyil (Chokaliuk) (1994 by Volodymyr (Romaniuk) as vicar Bishop of Vyshhorod (1994–2000), Bishop/Archbishop/Metropolitan of Rivne and Ostroh (2000–2005), died)
- Vasyl (Bodnarchuk) (joined (1992) as Archbishop/Metropolitan of Ternopil and Buchach (1992–2006), died)
- Stefan (Bilyak) (2002 by Filaret (Denysenko) as vicar Bishop of Boryspil (2002–2006), died)
- Pankratiy (Tarnavsky) (1997 by Filaret (Denysenko) as Bishop of Vinnytsia and Bratslav (1997–2000), retired (2000–2003), vicar Bishop of Vasylkiv (2003–2006), retired (2006–2009), died)
- Andriy (Horak) (joined (1992) as Bishop/Archbishop/Metropolitan of Lviv and Sokal (1992–2010), died)
- Flavian (Pasichnyk) (2000 by Filaret (Denysenko) as Bishop of Kharkiv and Bohodukhiv (2000–2004), retired (2004–2010), died)
- Serafym (Verzun) (1992 by Filaret (Denysenko) as Bishop of Zhytomyr and Ovruch (1992–1995), Bishop/Archbishop of Rivne and Ostroh (1995–2000), retired (2000), Archbishop of Odesa and Balta (2000–2002), Archbishop of Kirovohrad and Holovanivka (2002–2008), retired/reduction (2008–2012), died)
- Eusebius (Politylo) (2002 by Filaret (Denysenko) as Bishop/Archbishop/Metropolitan of Poltava and Kremenchuk (2002–2005), Metropolitan of Rivne and Ostroh (2005–2012), retired, died)
- Feodosiy (Paikush) (2004 by Filaret (Denysenko) as Bishop of Chernihiv and Nizhyn (2004–2011), vicar Bishop of Vasylkiv (2011–2012), died)
- Hryhoriy (Kachan) (1995 by Filaret (Denysenko) as vicar Bishop of Melitopol (1995–1996), Bishop of Melitopol and Zaporizhia (1996–2014), retired (2014–2016), died)
- Khryzostom (Bakomitros) (2005 by Filaret (Denysenko) as Bishop of Chersoneses (2005–2016), Exarch of Greece (2005–2016), died)

=== Excommunicated ===
- Polikarp (Pakholiuk) (joined (1992) as Bishop of Rivne and Volhynia (1992), unknown (?excommunicated))
- Christopher (Sitsas) (1997 by Filaret (Denysenko) as Bishop of Surozh (1997), retired, unknown (?excommunicated))
- Petro (Petrus) (returned (1997) as Metropolitan of Lviv and Sokal (1997), retired (1997), excommunicated)
- Varlaam (Pylypyshyn) (1994 by Filaret (Denysenko) as Bishop/Archbishop of Chernihiv and Sumy (1994–1999), Archbishop of Kitsman and Zastavne (1999), unknown (?excommunicated))
- Volodymyr (Polishchuk) (1997 by Filaret (Denysenko) as Bishop of Ivano-Frankivsk and Galicia (1997), Bishop of Donetsk and Luhansk (1997–1998), Bishop of Kharkiv (1999–2000), joined some religious organization)
- Nestor (Kulish) (1992 by Filaret (Denysenko) as Bishop/Archbishop of Cherkasy and Chyhyryn (1992–1995), Archbishop of Pereyaslav-Khmelnytskyi (1994–1997), Archbishop of Odesa and Balta (1997–1998), retired (1998–2001), joined Ukrainian Apostolate Orthodox Church)
- Herontiy (Khovansky) (1996 by Filaret (Denysenko) as Bishop of Sumy and Okhtyrka (1996–2000), Bishop/Archbishop of Vinnytsia and Bratslav (2000–2006), retired (2006–2008), joined some religious organization)
- Yuriy (Yurchyk) (1999 by Filaret (Denysenko) as Bishop/Archbishop of Donetsk and Luhansk (1999–2008), excommunicated (2008–2009), as a priest joined Ukrainian Greek Catholic Church)
- Paisiy (Dmokhovsky) (2001 by Filaret (Denysenko) as Bishop of Odesa and Balta (2001–2004), vicar Bishop of Fastiv (2005–2006), vicar Bishop of Boryspil (2006–2008), retired, (?excommunicated))
- Varukh (Tyschenkov) (1995 by Filaret (Denysenko) as Bishop/Archbishop of Tobolsk and Yeniseisk (1995–2011), excommunicated)
- Iov (Pavlyshyn) (1995 by Filaret (Denysenko) as Bishop/Archbishop of Ternopil and Kremenets (1995–2012), retired (2012), excommunicated)
- Sevastian (Vozniak) (2006 by Filaret (Denysenko) as Bishop of Chernihiv and Nizhyn (2006–2008), retired (2008–2018), excommunicated)

== See also ==
- List of bishops of the Ukrainian Autocephalous Orthodox Church
