= List of bishops of the Ukrainian Autocephalous Orthodox Church =

This is the list of the bishops of the Ukrainian Autocephalous Orthodox Church.

The Ukrainian Autocephalous Orthodox Church made its first deliberate attempt since 1686 to regain its independency from Moscow Patriarchate in 1919. However, no bishops were willing to lead the church. Therefore, the church decided to establish own bishops as they did in Early Christianity (see Consecration in Eastern Christianity). This did not solve an issue of legitimate bishops and those consecrated were labeled as self-consecrated or of the Lypkivsky's consecration. Nonetheless, most of the bishops were eventually persecuted by the Soviet regime as nationalistic and the church was liquidated by 1937.

The second attempt was taken by clergy of Polish Orthodox Church in 1942 after withdrawal of the Soviet forces as result of the German-Soviet War. The bishops of the Polish Orthodox Church managed to consecrate bishops for the new church but were forced to emigrate after return of the Soviet regime. The emigrated bishops established the Ukrainian church in diaspora and North America which eventually in 1990s joined the Ecumenical Patriarchate of Constantinople.

Just before dissolution of Soviet Union, in 1989 persecution of Ukrainian religious organizations has eased and Ukrainians started to revive own church. The revival was led by very few local bishops of Russian Orthodox Church and later supported by the Church from diaspora. The new effort was led by a bishop-emeritus of the Russian Orthodox Church Ioann (Bodnarchuk).

In 2018 the church became an integral part of the Orthodox Church of Ukraine.

== Bishops of UAOC and UAOC in diaspora ==
The church appeared originally as part of the Polish Orthodox Church. In 1948 UAOC lost its canonical communications with POC following emigration of its bishops from Ukraine after the World War II and with POC coming in closer ties with Russian Orthodox Church.

Upon its establishment the Ukrainian Autocephalous Orthodox Church recognized bishops of Ukrainian Autocephalous Orthodox Church that was led by Metropolitan Vasyl (Lypkivsky). The creation of the church was approved by Dionizy (Waledyński), the primate of Polish Orthodox Church. On 9 April 1944 in Warsaw Dionizy (Waledyński) was proclaimed as Patriarch of all Ukraine, but not enthroned due to the Red Army military offensive onto Warsaw.

Earlier in 1919 along with Archbishop of Yekaterinoslav Agapit (Vyshnevsky), Dionizy (Waledyński) were supposed to lead newly established Ukrainian Autocephalous Orthodox Church, but advancement of Russian armies of Anton Denikin prevented it.

#	Name	Rank	Title	Date of consecration	Lead consecrator	Years in UAOC		Notes
#	Name	Rank	Title	Date of consecration	Lead consecrator	From	To	Notes
1	Aleksandr (Inozemtsev)	· bishop (to 1927) · archbishop (to 1942) · metropolitan	· Lublin (to 1922) · Pinsk and Polesie	June 4, 1922	George (Yaroshevsky) (ROC)	December 24, 1941	December 31, 1944	joined ROCOR
2	Polikarp (Sikorsky)	· bishop (to 02.08 1941) · archbishop (to 1945) · metropolitan	· Lutsk, vicar of Volhynian eparchy (to 02.08 1941) · Lutsk and Kovel (до 1945) · Lutsk and Volhynia	April 10, 1932	Dionysius (Waledyński) (POC)	December 24, 1941	October 22, 1953	reorganized as UAOC in diaspora
3	Jerzy (Korenistow)	· bishop	· Brest, vicar of Pinsk and Polesie eparchy	February 8, 1942	Aleksandr (Inozemtsev) (UAOC)	February 8, 1942	December 31, 1943	joined POC
4	Nykanor (Abramovych)	· bishop (to 17.05 1942) · archbishop (to 22.10 1953) · metropolitan	· Kyiv and Chyhyryn (to 22.10 1953) · Kyiv	February 9, 1942	Aleksandr (Inozemtsev) (UAOC)	February 9, 1942	March 21, 1969	reorganized as UAOC in diaspora
5	Ihor (Huba)	· bishop (to May 1942) · archbishop	· Uman (to July 1942) · Bila Tserkva, vicar of Kyiv and Chyhyryn eparchy (to 1954) · parish of Saint Trinity in New York	February 10, 1942	Aleksandr (Inozemtsev) (UAOC)	February 10, 1942	November 24, 1966	reorganized as UAOC in diaspora
6	Photios (Tymoshchuk)	· bishop	· Chernihiv (to 1942) · Vinnytsia	May 10, 1942	Nykanor (Abramovych) (UAOC)	May 10, 1942	January 31, 1943	left UAOC
7	Manuil (Tarnavsky)	· bishop	· Bila Tserkva, vicar Kyiv and Chyhyryn eparchy	May 11, 1942	Nykanor (Abramovych) (UAOC)	May 11, 1942	June 22, 1942	joined UAutonomousOC, repeated consecration
8	Michael (Khoroshy)	· bishop (to 1945) · archbishop	· Kirovohrad	May 12, 1942	Nykanor (Abramovych) (UAOC)	May 12, 1942	August 8, 1951	joined UOC (Canada)
9	Mstyslav (Skrypnyk)	· bishop (to 1947) · archbishop (to 1950) · metropolitan (to 18.11.1990) · patriarch	· Pereyaslav (to 1947) · Winnipeg and all Canada (to 1950) · New York (to 18.11.1990) · Kyiv and All Ukraine	May 14, 1942	Nykanor (Abramovych) (UAOC)	May 14, 1942	June 11, 1993	reorganized as UAOC in diaspora, in 1947—1950 UOC (Canada)
10	Sylvester (Hayevsky)	· bishop (to 1953) · archbishop	· Lubny (to 1953) · Melbourne and Australia-New Zealand	May 16, 1942	Nykanor (Abramovych) (UAOC)	May 16, 1942	September 9, 1975	reorganized as UAOC in diaspora
11	Hryhoriy (Ohiychuk)	· bishop	· Zhytomyr (to 1947)	May 17, 1942	Nykanor (Abramovych) (UAOC)	May 17, 1942	October 3, 1947	created UAOC – Assembly-Ruled
12	Hennadiy (Shyprykevych)	· bishop (to 1944) · archbishop	· Sicheslav (to 15.10.1950) · Chicago and West American	May 24, 1942	Polikarp (Sikorsky) (UAOC)	May 24, 1942	September 1, 1962	joined UAOC – Assembly-Ruled
13	Volodymyr (Malets)	· bishop (to 1956) · archbishop	· Cherkasy (to 1943) · Yelyzavetghrad (to 1944) · North Bavarian (to 1949) · Detroit	June 23, 1942	Nykanor (Abramovych) (UAOC)	June 23, 1942	July 23, 1967	reorganized as UAOC in diaspora
14	Feofil (Buldovsky)	· metropolitan	· Kharkiv	January 14, 1923	Hryhoriy (Lisovsky) (ROC)	July 27, 1942	January 13, 1944	died in prison
15	Platon (Artemiuk)	· bishop	· Zaslav (to 1942) · Rivne	August 2, 1942	Nykanor (Abramovych) (UAOC)	August 2, 1942	August 5, 1951	reorganized as UAOC in diaspora
16	Vyacheslav (Lysytsky)	· bishop	· Dubno	September 13, 1942	Polikarp (Sikorsky) (UAOC)	September 13, 1942	February 26, 1951	joined North American Metropolitanate, repeated consecration
17	Serhiy (Okhotenko)	· bishop (to 1949) · archbishop	· Melitopol (to 1949)	August 1, 1943	Michael (Khoroshy) (UAOC)	August 1, 1943	February 4, 1949	blessed to join Belarusian AOC

=== Ruling bishops ===
- Polikarp (Sikorsky) (joined from POC (1942) as Metropolitan of Lutsk and Volhynia (1941–1953)
  - temporary administrator of Autocephalous Church (1941–1945)
  - Primate of Ukrainian Autocephalous Orthodox Church in Diaspora (1945–1953)
- Nykanor (Abramovych) (1942 by Aleksandr (Inozemtsev) as Metropolitan of Kyiv and Chyhyryn (1942–1969)
  - Primate of Ukrainian Autocephalous Orthodox Church in Diaspora (1953–1969)
- Mstyslav (Skrypnyk) (1942 by Nykanor (Abramovych) as Metropolitan of New York (1950–1990), Metropolitan of Kyiv (1969–1993)
  - Primate of Ukrainian Autocephalous Orthodox Church in Diaspora (1969–1993)
  - Primate of Ukrainian Autocephalous Orthodox Church (1990–1993)

== Former Bishops of the Ukrainian Autocephalous Orthodox Church (World War II) ==
=== Joined Ukrainian Orthodox Church of Canada ===
- Mstyslav (Skrypnyk) (1942 by Nykanor (Abramovych) as Bishop of Pereyaslav (1942–1947), joined Ukrainian Orthodox Church of Canada)
- Platon (Artemiuk) (1942 by Polikarp (Sikorsky) as Bishop of Rivne (1942–1950), joined Ukrainian Orthodox Church of Canada)
- Michael (Khoroshy) (1942 by Nykanor (Abramovych) as Bishop of Kirovohrad (1942–1951), joined Ukrainian Orthodox Church of Canada)
- Sylvester (Hayevsky) (1942 by Nykanor (Abramovych) as Bishop of Lubny (1942–1953), Bishop of Melbourne and all Australia and Nova Zealandia (1953–1975), retired (1962–1975), joined Ukrainian Orthodox Church of Canada (1965–1975))

=== Joined Ukrainian Orthodox Church in America ===
- Ihor (Huba) (1942 by Aleksandr (Inozemtsev) as vicar Bishop of Uman (1942), Bishop of Bila Tserkva (1942–1951), joined Ukrainian Orthodox Church in America (1951–1954), along with Bishop Palladiy (Vidybida-Rudenko) in UAOC in exile (1954–1961), returned to UAOC in diaspora as Archbishop-Paroch of St.Trinity (1961–1966), died)

=== Joined churches of Moscow Patriarchate ===
- Aleksandr (Inozemtsev) (joined from POC (1942) as Metropolitan of Polesye (1941–1944), joined Russian Orthodox Church Outside of Russia)
- Fotiy (Tymoshchuk) (1942 by Nykanor (Abramovych) as Bishop of Chernihiv (1942), Bishop of Vinnytsia (1942–1943), left the church)
- Manuil (Tarnavsky) (1942 by Nykanor (Abramovych) as vicar Bishop of Bila Tserkva (1942), left the church)
- Vyacheslav (Lysytsky) (1942 by Polikarp (Sikorsky) as Bishop of Dubno (1942–1951), joined Orthodox Church in America)

=== Joined other churches ===
- Georgiy (Korenistov) (1942 by Aleksandr (Inozemtsev) as vicar Bishop of Berestia (1942–1944), joined Polish Orthodox Church)
- Serhiy (Okhotenko) (1942 by Michael (Khoroshy) as Bishop of Melitopol (1943–1949), joined Belarusian Autocephalous Orthodox Church as its primate (archbishop) and approval of Ukrainian Autocephalous Orthodox Church)
- Ihor (Huba) (1942 by Aleksandr (Inozemtsev) as vicar Bishop of Uman (1942), Bishop of Bila Tserkva (1942–1951), joined Ukrainian Orthodox Church in America (1951–1954), along with Bishop Palladiy (Vidybida-Rudenko) in UAOC in exile (1954–1961), returned to UAOC in diaspora as Archbishop-Paroch of St.Trinity (1961–1966), died)

=== Joined Ukrainian Autocephalous Orthodox Church – Assembly-Ruled ===
- Hryhoriy (Ohiychuk) (1942 by Nykanor (Abramovych) as Bishop of Zhytomyr (1942), jailed by Nazi Germany (1942–1943), Bishop of Zhytomyr and Vinnytsia (1943–1947), joined Ukrainian Autocephalous Orthodox Church – Assembly-Ruled and excommunicated)
- Hennadiy (Shyprykevych) (1942 by Polikarp (Sikorsky) as Bishop of Sicheslav (1942–1950), joined Ukrainian Orthodox Church of the USA and later Ukrainian Autocephalous Orthodox Church – Assembly-Ruled)

== Bishops of the Ukrainian Autocephalous Orthodox Church ==
The church revival in Ukraine has started on efforts of bishop of the Ukrainian Exarchate Ioan (Bodnarchuk) in 1989-90. In April of 1992 Ioan (Bodnarchuk) was banned from the church. In June of 1992 most of bishops joined the Ukrainian Orthodox Church – Kyiv Patriarchate (UOC-KP) as part of the first unification attempt, while only Bishop of Chernivtsi Danyil did not rush with his decision. Patriarch Mstyslav excommunicated Metropolitan Antoniy and Archbishop Romaniuk who joined the unification with Metropolitan Filaret. In December of 1992 Bishop Danyil finally joined UOC-KP, while at the same time Archbishop of Lviv Petro decided to stay as part of the original Ukrainian Autocephalous Orthodox Church (UAOC).

- Andriy (Abramchuk) (returned from UOC-KP (1995) as Metropolitan of Ivano-Frankivsk and Galicia (1995–2018), joined Orthodox Church of Ukraine)
- Roman (Balashchuk) (returned from UOC-KP (1995) as Archbishop/Metropolitan of Vinnytsia and Bratslav (1995–2018), joined Orthodox Church of Ukraine)
- Macarius (Maletych) (1996 by Dymytriy (Yarema) as Bishop/Archbishop/Metropolitan of Lviv (1996–2018), Metropolitan of Kyiv and all Ukraine (2015–2018), joined Orthodox Church of Ukraine)
- Volodymyr (Shlapak) (2009 by Methodius (Kudriakov) as Bishop/Archbishop of Zhytomyr and Polesie (2009–2015/2015–2018), joined Orthodox Church of Ukraine)
- Afanasiy (Shkurupiy) (2009 by Methodius (Kudriakov) as Bishop/Archbishop of Kharkiv and Poltava (2009–2018), joined Orthodox Church of Ukraine)
- Herman (Semanchuk) (2009 by Methodius (Kudriakov) as Bishop/Archbishop of Chernivtsi and Khotyn (2009–2018), joined Orthodox Church of Ukraine)
- Volodymyr (Cherpak) (2010 by Methodius (Kudriakov) as vicar Bishop of Vyshhorod and Podil (2010–2018), joined Orthodox Church of Ukraine)
- Iov (Pavlyshyn) (came from UOC-KP (2012) as Archbishop of Ternopil and Kremenets (2012–2015), retired (2015–2018), joined Orthodox Church of Ukraine)
- Herontiy (Orlyansky) (2014 by Methodius (Kudriakov) as vicar Bishop of Drohobych (2014–2018), vicar Bishop of Boryspil (2018), joined Orthodox Church of Ukraine)
- Kyrylo (Mykhailyuk) (came from UOC-KP (2014) as Bishop of Uzhhorod and Trans-Carpathian (2014–2018), joined Orthodox Church of Ukraine)
- Viktor (Begy) (2015 by Macarius (Maletych) as Bishop of Mukachevo and Carpathian (2015–2018), joined Orthodox Church of Ukraine)
- Borys (Kharko) (2015 by Macarius (Maletych) as Bishop of Kherson and Mykolaiv (2015–2018), joined Orthodox Church of Ukraine)
- Tykhon (Petranyuk) (came from UOC-KP (2017) as Bishop of Odesa and Black Sea (2017), Archbishop of Ternopil (2017–2018), joined Orthodox Church of Ukraine)
- Savva (Fryziuk) (2017 by Macarius (Maletych) as Bishop of Donetsk and Sloviansk (2017–2018), joined Orthodox Church of Ukraine)
- Pavlo (Mysak) (2018 by Macarius (Maletych) as vicar Bishop of Kolomyia (2018), joined Orthodox Church of Ukraine)
- Havryil (Kryzyna) (2018 by Macarius (Maletych) as Bishop of Rivne and Volhynia (2018), joined Orthodox Church of Ukraine)

== Former Bishops of the Ukrainian Autocephalous Orthodox Church ==
=== Left the Church for UOC – KP before 2018 ===
- Vasyl (Bodnarchuk) (1990 by Ioan (Bodnarchuk) as Bishop/Archbishop of Ternopil and Buchach (1990–1992), joined UOC-KP)
- Andriy (Abramchuk) (1990 by Ioan (Bodnarchuk) as Bishop/Archbishop of Ivano-Frankivsk and Kolomyia (1990–1992), Metropolitan of Ivano-Frankivsk and Galicia (1992), joined UOC-KP)
- Danyil (Kovalchuk) (1990 by Ioan (Bodnarchuk) as Bishop of Chernivtsi and Bukovyna (1990–1992), joined UOC-KP)
- Polikarp (Pakholiuk) (1991 by Mstyslav (Skrypnyk) as Vicar Bishop of Ovruch (1991–1992), joined UOC-KP)
- Petro (Petrus) (1992 by Antoniy (Masendych) as Bishop/Archbishop of Lviv and Sokal (1992), joined UOC-KP)
- Roman (Popenko) (1992 by Antoniy (Masendych) as Bishop of Mykolaiv and Poltava (1992), joined UOC-KP)
- Mykhail (Dutkevych) (1992 by Antoniy (Masendych) as Bishop of Bila Tserkva and Uman (1992), joined UOC-KP)
- Petro (Petrus) (returned from UOC-KP (1992) as Archbishop/Metropolitan of Lviv and Sokal (1992–1996), retired (1996–1997), joined UOC-KP)
- Ioan (Modzalevsky) (1996 by Roman (Balashchuk) as Bishop/Archbishop of Moscow and Kolomna (1996–1999), vicar Archbishop of Kremenets (1999–2001), Archbishop of Kherson and Crimea (2001–2007), vicar Archbishop of Uman (2007–2013), joined UOC-KP)
- Ioan (Boychuk) (1996 by Andriy (Abramchuk) as Bishop of Rivne and Ostroh (1996), Bishop of Zhytomyr and Ovruch (1996–1997), joined UOC-KP)
- Yakiv (Makarchuk) (1998 by Dymytriy (Yarema) as Bishop of Cherkasy and Kirovohrad (1998–2004), joined UOC-KP)
- Lavrentiy (Myhovych) (2004 by Methodius (Kudriakov) as Bishop of Poltava and Myrhorod (2004–2005), joined UOC-KP)
- Mykhail (Bondarchuk) (came from UOC-KP (2006) as vicar Bishop of Fastiv (2006–2011), joined UOC-KP)
- Ioan (Shvets) (2010 by Methodius (Kudriakov) as vicar Bishop of Svyatoshyno (2010–2011), Bishop of Lviv and Sambir (2011–2013), joined UOC-KP)
- Adrian (Kulyk) (2011 by Methodius (Kudriakov) as Bishop of Khmelnytskyi and Kamianets-Podilskyi (2011–2013), joined UOC-KP)

=== Left the Church for the Moscow Patriarchate and others ===
- Mykola (Hrokh) (1990 by Ioan (Bodnarchuk) as Bishop of Lutsk and Volhynia (1990–1992), joined UOC-MP)
- Antoniy (Fialko) (1991 by Mstyslav (Skrypnyk) as Bishop of Khmelnytskyi and Kamianets-Podilskyi (1991–1992), joined UOC-MP)
- Panteleimon (Romanovsky) (1991 by Antoniy (Masendych) as Bishop of Mykolaiv and Kherson (1991–1992), Bishop of Vinnytsia and Kirovohrad (1992), joined UOC-MP)

=== Died ===
- Mstyslav (Skrypnyk) (1942 by Nikanor (Abramovych) as Bishop of Pereyaslav (Ukrainian Autocephalous Orthodox Church, 1942), Bishop in Germany (1944–1946), Metropolitan of the Ukrainian Orthodox Church of Canada (1947–1950), Head of Consistory of the Ukrainian Orthodox Church of the USA (1950–1971), Metropolitan of the Ukrainian Orthodox Church of the USA (1971–1993), Metropolitan of the Ukrainian Autocephalous Orthodox Church in diaspora (1969–1993), Patriarch of Kyiv and all Ukraine (1990–1993), died)
- Dymytriy (Yarema) (1993 by Petro (Petrus) as Bishop of Pereyaslav and Sicheslav (1993), Patriarch of Kyiv and all Ukraine (1993–2000), died)
- Petro (Brook de Traal) (1996 by Methodius (Kudriakov) as Bishop/Archbishop of Kaffa and Gothia (1996–2011), died)
- Feodosiy (Petsyna) (came from UOC-KP (2007) as Archbishop of Drohobych and Sambir (2007–2010), died)
- Methodius (Kudriakov) (1995 by Volodymyr (Romaniuk) as Bishop of Khmelnytskyi and Kamianets-Podilskyi (UOC-KP, 1995), Archbishop/Metropolitan of Ternopil and Podolia (UAOC, 1997–2015), Primate of UAOC (2000–2015), Metropolitan of Kyiv and all Ukraine (2002–2015), died)
- Ilarion (Savchuk) (2005 by Methodius (Kudriakov) as Bishop of Cherkasy and Kirovohrad (2005–2015), died)

=== Excommunicated ===
- Ioan (Bodnarchuk) (1977 by Filaret (Denysenko) as Bishop of Zhytomyr and Ovruch (Ukrainian Exarchate, 1977–1989), Archbishop/Metropolitan of Lviv and Galicia (1989–1992), Metropolitan of Zhytomyr and Ovruch (1992), excommunicated)
- Volodymyr (Romaniuk) (1990 by Ioan (Bodnarchuk) as Bishop of Uzhhorod and Vynohradiv (1990), Vicar Archbishop of Bila Tserkva (1990–1991), Vicar Archbishop of Vyshhorod (1991–1992), excommunicated)
- Roman (Balashchuk) (1990 by Ioan (Bodnarchuk) as Bishop/Archbishop of Chernihiv and Sumy (1990–1992), joined UOC-KP (?excommunicated))
- Antoniy (Masendych) (1990 by Ioan (Bodnarchuk) as Bishop/Archbishop of Rivne and Zhytomyr (1990–1992), Metropolitan of Pereyaslav and Sicheslav (1992), excommunicated)
- Sofroniy (Vlasov) (1992 by Antoniy (Masendych) as Bishop of Vinnytsia and Kirovohrad (1992), Bishop of Zhytomyr and Ovruch (1992), joined UOC-KP (?excommunicated))
- Mykhail (Dutkevych) (returned (1993) as Bishop of Bila Tserkva and Uman (1993–2001), created Ukrainian Apostolate Orthodox Church)
- Feoktist (Peresada) (1993 by Petro (Petrus) as Bishop/Archbishop of Lutsk and Volhynia (1993–1997), retired (1997–2001), joined Ukrainian Apostolate Orthodox Church)
- Ihor (Isichenko) (1993 by Petro (Petrus) as Bishop/Archbishop of Kharkiv and Poltava (1993–2003), created separate organization within own eparchy)
- Mstyslav (Huk) (2010 by Methodius (Kudriakov) as vicar Bishop of Ternopil and Chervonohrad (2010–2015), Archbishop of Ternopil (2015–2016), Archbishop of Khmelnytskyi and Kamianets-Podilskyi (2016–2017), banned)
