= Mefodiy =

Mefodiy may refer to:

- Mefodiy (Kudriakov) (1949–2015), primate of the Ukrainian Autocephalous Orthodox Church, Metropolitan of Kyiv and all Ukraine
- Mefodiy (Sribnyak) (born 1957), archbishop of Sumy and Ohtyrska UOC KP
