= Abramchuk =

Abramchuk is an East Slavic patronymic surname derived from the given name Abram. Notable people with the surname include:

- Alena Abramchuk (born 1988), Belarusian track athlete
- Andrew Abramchuk, metropolitan bishop of Halychyna of the Orthodox Church of Ukraine
