= Eusebius Politylo =

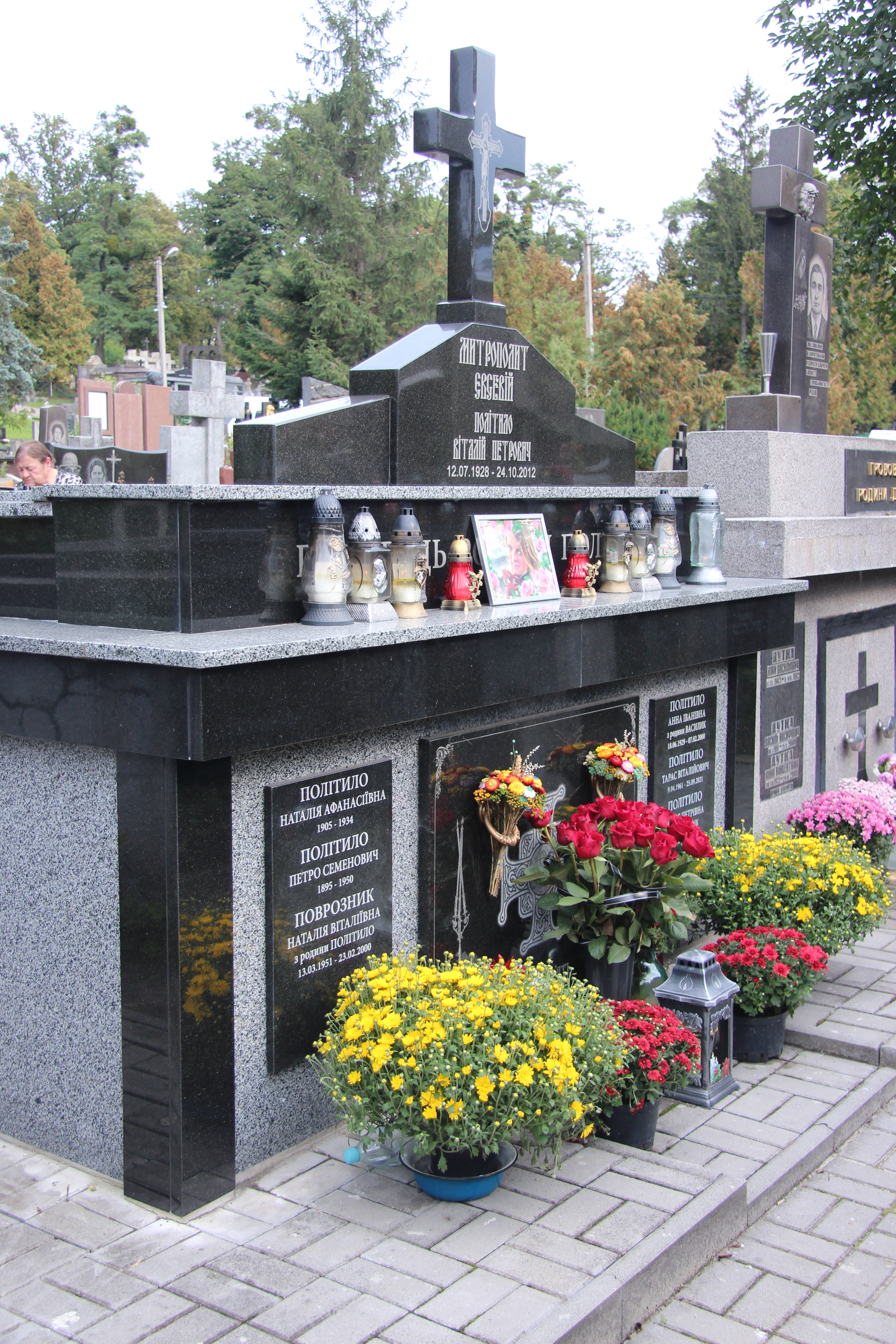
Tomb of the Politylo family. Yaniv cemetery.

Yevseviy Politylo (Ukrainian: Євсевій (Політило); July 12, 1928 – October 24, 2012), romanized to Eusebius Politylo, was the Ukrainian Orthodox metropolitan of Rivne and Ostroh. He was born in Dnipropetrovsk Oblast, and died in Lviv.
