= Ioann Bodnarchuk =

Ukrainian Orthodox hierarch (1927–1994)

Metropolitan John (Bodnarchuk)
- Church: Ukrainian Orthodox Church – Kyiv Patriarchate
- Diocese: Drohobych-Sambir / Volyn-Lutsk
- Installed: 1993 – 1994
- Other posts: Lviv and Halych (1990–1992); Zhytomyr and Ovruch (1977–1989)

Orders
- Ordination: 23 October 1977 (bishop) by Filaret Denysenko
- Consecration: 21 May 1961 (priest) by Pimen Izvekov
- Rank: Metropolitan bishop

Personal details
- Born: Vasyl Mykolayovych Bodnarchuk; 12 April 1929 Ivane-Puste, Borszczów County, Tarnopol Voivodeship, Poland
- Died: 9 November 1994 (aged 65) Yablunivka, Volyn Oblast, Ukraine
- Denomination: Eastern Orthodox
- Education: Leningrad Theological Academy

Metropolitan John (Ukrainian: Митрополит Іоан or Іоанн, Ioann; secular name Vasyl Mykolayovych Bodnarchuk, Ukrainian: Василь Миколайович Боднарчук, Russian: Василий Николаевич Боднарчук; 12 April 1927 – 9 November 1994) was an Orthodox hierarch born in the Ternopil area of Western Ukraine, which at that time was a territory of Poland. Defrocked from the Russian Orthodox Church, metropolitan Ioann played a notable role in revival of the Ukrainian Autocephalous Orthodox Church.

During his life he served as a bishop successively in the Russian Orthodox Church (1977–1989), in the Ukrainian Autocephalous Orthodox Church (1989–1992) and in the Ukrainian Orthodox Church of the Kyivan Patriarchate (1992–1994).

== Biography ==
Though he was born into a family of Ukrainian Catholics, he converted to Orthodoxy early in his childhood. His name at birth was Vasyl Bodnarchuk (Wasyl Bodnarczuk).

=== Arrest ===
Following World War II since 1945, Vasyl Bodnarchuk served as a cantor (dyak) leading a church choir in home village Ivane-Puste.

In 1946, the Soviet authorities liquidated the Ukrainian Greek Catholic Church which was widespread in Western Ukraine, while many members of the church were persecuted in various ways. In 1949, Ioan (Bodnarchuk) was arrested for his relations with Organization of Ukrainian Nationalists and sentenced to 20 years of hard labor spending time in Tyumen labor camp and later in the Kengir copper mines near Karaganda (Steplag). His family also was deported to Kazakhstan, where they lived until 1954 and in 1953 or in 1955 he was released on amnesty.

== Career in the Russian Orthodox Church ==
In 1957, he was accepted into the Leningrad Theological Seminary and on 25 January 1958, he received holy orders to become a deacon. After graduating from the seminary, he was accepted into the Leningrad Theological Academy and on 21 May 1961, he received holy orders became a priest with the ceremony being led by Metropolitan of Leningrad and Ladoga Pimen. Note, both seminary and academy are located in one place, Alexander Nevsky Lavra.

In 1964, he graduated the Academy with a PhD in Divinity and he was sent to the Lviv and Ternopil diocese of the Moscow Patriarchate. He served as a priest in the village of Striivka in Zbarazh Raion which is in the Ternopil Oblast and in 1968, he served as a priest in a parish in the Lviv Oblast (Truskavets).

=== Clergy experience ===
On 11 October 1977, he took his monastic vows in Pochaiv Lavra and on 14 October 1977 was awarded the title of Archimandrite. On 23 October 1977, he was consecrated as a bishop of Zhytomyr and Ovruch (Russian Orthodox Church), the cheirotonia service was led by Metropolitan of Kyiv and Galicia Filaret (Denysenko), Metropolitan of Lviv and Ternopil Mykola (Yuryk), Archbishop of Simferopol and Crimea Leontiy (Hudymov), Bishop of Mukachevo and Uzhhorod Savva (Babinets), Bishop of Kirovohrad and Mykolaiv Sebastian (Pylypchuk).

== Establishment of the Ukrainian Autocephalous Orthodox Church ==
In the beginning of 1989 there was created the Initiative Committee on revival of the Ukrainian Autocephalous Orthodox Church (UAOC) led by a priest Bohdan Mykhailechko, provost of Assumption of the Blessed Virgin Mary Church in Jelgava, Latvian SSR. The committee petitioned to presidiums of supreme councils of the Soviet Union and the Ukrainian SSR to legalise and register Ukrainian Autocephalous Orthodox Church. The committee members also were asking Ecumenical Patriarch Demetrios I of Constantinople, Ukrainian Autocephalous Orthodox Church in diaspora and other autocephalous churches to show support for Ukrainians to have own church. In June 1989 the UAOC Kyiv community petitioned to the Kyiv city authorities to have the Nicholas Embarkment Church at Kyiv Harbour transferred to them, but it was absolutely declined. On 19 August 1989 a group of clergy and laity led by protoiereus Dymytriy Yarema who was a provost of Peter and Paul Church in Lviv declared of leaving the Russian Orthodox Church. Less than a month later on 8 September 1989 Metropolitan Mstyslav of UAOC in the US and diaspora, a locum tenens of Kyiv Metropolia, announced that protoiereus Bohdan Mykhailechko is his deputy and spiritual administrator with obligations to organize, coordinate, and carry out actions to revive the Holy Ukrainian Autocephalous Orthodox Church in Ukraine, while Dymytriy Yarema was appointed his assistant.

On 13 September 1989 Ioan (Bodnarchuk) was released from management of the diocese on the basis of health problems and granted a leave of absence on his personal request earlier in June 1989. Five days after his dismissal, bishop Ioan asked the Holy Synod to reinstate him in the Church as he recovered. On 3 October 1989 the Holy Synod requested from him supporting documentation to confirm his health conditions and on 9 October 1989 he submitted requested documents.

Earlier on 1 October 1989 Ioan (Bodnarchuk) sent a telegram to the Holy Synod announcing that he is leaving Moscow Patriarchate and accepts a canonical rule of Metropolitan Mstyslav of UAOC in the USA and diaspora. On 2 October 1989 in Lviv took place the Ukrainian Autocephalous Orthodox Church eparchial assembly that appealed to Ioan (Bodnarchuk) to take charge in leading the Ukrainian Autocephalous Orthodox Church. On 16 October 1989 Ioan (Bodnarchuk) accepted the petition. On 20 October 1989 Ioan Bodnarchuk was elected by an "Assembly" in the Church of Sts. Peter and Paul in Lviv as the First Hierarch of the revived UAOC. On 22 October 1989 Ioan (Bodnarchuk) consecrated a deacon of Ukrainian Autocephalous Orthodox Church.

On 1 November 1989 Ioan Bodnarchuk sent a telegram to the Moscow Patriarch administration stating that he is officially leaving the Russian Orthodox Church and becoming a member of the Ukrainian Autocephalous Orthodox Church led by Metropolitan Mstyslav of Philadelphia who was proclaimed a primate of the church on 30 October 1989. Soon thereafter, Ioann Bodnarchuk had conversation with the Archbishop of Lviv and Drohobych Ireneus Seredniy who was a ruling bishop of the diocese and a member of Holy Synod at that time and who warned him not to cause a schism. The efforts of the Archbishop had no results.

On 13 November 1989 Ioan (Bodnarchuk) was invited in from of the Holy Synod to review his case, but he informed the Synod that he will not be present as he is not a member of the Russian Orthodox Church. On 14 November 1989 he defrocked by the Holy Synod of the Russian Orthodox Church based on the Rule 15 of the 861 Council of Constantinople and taking away his bishopric and monastic orders. On proposal of metropolitan bishop Filaret (Denysenko), on January 30-31, 1990 the Council of Bishops (Archiereus) of the ROC confirmed that decision.

To stop the schismatic tendencies in the region, the Exarch of Ukraine Filaret Denysenko toured the Ternopil Oblast in May of 1990 and spoke with local clergy.

By 1990 the Ukrainian Autocephalous Orthodox Church was accounted for around 200 parishes predominantly in Western Ukraine. The Church in Ukraine was faced with a problem in reinstating its bishop hierarchy lacking a second bishop while bishops from diaspora were not allowed to enter the Soviet Union by the Soviet government. Ioan (Bodnarchuk) petition to Patriarch of Georgian Orthodox Church, vicar bishop Jonathan (Yeletskikh) of Pereyaslav, metropolitan Vladimir (Cantarean) of Chișinău and all Moldova, and others.

=== Consecrated bishops ===
- Basil Bodnarchuk – 31 March 1990 (along with bishop of Simferopol and Crimea Varlaam (Ilyushchenko), bishop of Yasnaya Poliana Vikenty)
- Andrew Abramchuk – 7 April 1990 (along with bishop Basil of Ternopil-Buchach, bishop Vikenty of Yasna Poliana)
- Daniel (Kovalchuk) – 27 April 1990 (along with bishop Basil of Ternopil-Buchach, bishop Andrew of Ivano-Frankivsk and Kolomyia)
- Volodymyr (Romaniuk) – 29 April 1990 (along with bishop Basil of Ternopil-Buchach, bishop Andrew of Ivano-Frankivsk and Kolomyia, bishop Daniel of Chernivtsi and Bukovina)
- Nicholas (Hrokh) – 19 May 1990
- Roman (Balashchuk) – 22 May 1990 (along with bishop Basil of Ternopil-Buchach, bishop Andrew of Ivano-Frankivsk and Kolomyia)
- Anthony (Masendych) – 16 September 1990 (along with bishop Volodymyr, bishop Daniel of Chernivtsi and Bukovina)

=== After visit of Patriarch Mstyslav ===
Soon after enthronization of Patriarch Mstyslav, Ioann Bodnarchuk lost his title of the First Hierarch on decision of Patriarch Mstyslav and corresponding corrections were made to the UAOC statute. Patriarch Mstyslav pointed out that since the church has its ruling Patriarch, there is no need for the post of First Hierarch nor locum tenens. Instead, Patriarch Mstyslav created post of the UAOC affairs administrator which was assigned to the newly ordained bishop Anthony (Masendych).

In 1991 all consecrations were repeated with help of bishop Anthony (Scharba) of Washington when credentials of bishop Vikentiy of Yasna Poliana were questioned. In May of 1991 Ioann Bodnarchuk traveled to the United States to seek medical help. In his absence, the UAOC Demetrius Yarema wrote an article in the Lviv city newspaper accusing Ioann Bodnarchuk in “hypocrisy, thirst for power and money, insidiousness and vindictiveness”. Upon return from the United States Ioann Bodnarchuk informed that along with treatment he also managed to meet with representatives of the Ecumenical Patriarch to gain recognition of the UAOC. That announcement was reproached to Bodnarchuk as an excess of his powers. It also became known that Bodnarchuk was given $30,000 abroad to support the UAOC. He did not bring any money to Lviv, justifying himself by saying that he had been robbed at the airport in Germany. On 4 October 1991 Patriarch Mstyslav sent a letter to the UAOC Bishop Council with the following: "Based on the clearly destructive and harmful actions of Metropolitan John for our Church and his incorrect attitude towards his fellow bishops, I deprive him of the right to represent our Church externally, and all his orders in the internal life of our Church are ineffective". He also advised that the Bishop Council should consider to review situation with Ioann Bodnarchuk.

On 11 December 1991 Bodnarchuk issued own ukase prohibiting Yarema in his services.

On 3 January 1992 Patriarch Mstyslav came back to Ukraine and called on the Bishop Council for 23 January 1992. The council removed the Yarema's prohibition in his services and moved Metropolitan Ioann to a different diocese (Zhytomyr). On 2 February 1992 Ioann Bodnarchuk supposedly called Patriarch Mstyslav the "enemy of Ukrainian people".

== Career in the Ukrainian Orthodox Church – Kyiv Patriarchate ==
Then on 9 April 1992, he was defrocked from the clergy of the Ukrainian Autocephalous Orthodox Church, where he repented and submitted an application on returning to the Moscow Patriarchate. At the same time the Ukrainian Orthodox Church (Moscow Patriarchate) led by Metropolitan Filaret Denysenko was in crisis as it was appealing for a full autocephaly from the Moscow. In May of 1992 the Bishop Council of the Ukrainian Orthodox Church (Moscow Patriarchate) held a meeting in Kharkiv without their leader Metropolitan Filaret and dethroned him. On 11 June 1992 the Bishop Council which was reviewing situation with Filaret Denysenko also review the application of Ioann Bodnarchuk. Ioann Bodnarchuk wrote the following: "I suffered a lot from both strangers and my own. And today I bow my head low before you, Your Holiness, and you, God-wise arch-pastors and fathers, and I ask you to forgive me my unauthorized excommunication and accept me into the bosom of our holy Orthodox Church of Christ.” But, before the decision was made on his behalf, Metropolitan Ioann changed his mind and recalled his petition.

Instead, he joined the Ukrainian Orthodox Church – Kyiv Patriarchate and was appointed as Metropolitan of Drohobych and Sambir. Later he would be appointed Metropolitan of Lutsk and Volyn.

== Death ==
He died in a car accident in 1994.

Eastern Orthodox Church titles
New title	Metropolitan of Lutsk and Volhynia (Ukrainian Orthodox Church – Kyivan Patriarchate); 1993–1994	Succeeded by Jacob Panchuk
New title	Metropolitan of Drohobych and Sambir (Ukrainian Orthodox Church – Kyivan Patriarchate); 1993–1994	Succeeded by Theodosius Petsyna
Preceded by Joseph Shumlianskyj	Metropolitan of Lviv and Galicia-Volhynia (Ukrainian Autocephalous Orthodox Church); 1990–1992	Succeeded by Peter Petrus
Preceded by Palladij Kaminskij	Bishop of Zhitomir and Ovruch (Ukrainian Exarchate); 1977–1989	Succeeded by Job Tyvoniuk
