= Anthony Masendych =

Antoniy
- Bishop of Barnaul and Altai
- Church: Russian Orthodox Church; Ukrainian Autocephalous Orthodox Church
- Installed: 19 March 1994
- Term ended: 8 July 2001
- Predecessor: (revived) Grigorios (Kozyrev)
- Successor: Maximus (Dmitriyev)
- Other posts: Bishop of Rivne and Zhytomyr (UAOC)

Orders
- Ordination: 25 February 1984 by Serapion (Fadeyev)
- Consecration: 16 September 1990 (UAOC); 19 March 1994 (ROC) by Ioann (Bodnarchuk) (UAOC)

Personal details
- Born: Ivan Ivanovych Masendych; 20 April 1961 Plavie, Lviv Oblast
- Died: 8 July 2001 (aged 40) Barnaul, Russian Federation

Bishop Anthony (secular name Ivan Ivanovich Masendich, Russian: Иван Иванович Масендич or Ivan Ivanovych Masendych, Ukrainian: Іван Іванович Масендич; 20 April 1961 – 8 July 2001) was a bishop of the Russian Orthodox Church, the bishop of Barnaul and Altai. Before 1994 he also participated in revival of the Ukrainian Autocephalous Orthodox Church (UAOC).

== Biography ==
He was born in Carpathian village of Plavie which is in Lviv Oblast, Ukraine. His primary and secondary education he received in a regular school and a medical vocation school in Ivano-Frankivsk. In 1980 Masendych was drafted to military service which he carried out at the construction of the Baikal–Amur Mainline. After demobilization Masendych worked in Vladimir eparchy administration. In 1982 he accepted his monastic tonsure from Archimandrite Alexius (Kutepov) receiving his monastic name Antoniy and soon elevated to a rank of hierodeacon. In 1983 to 1985 Masendych studied at the Moscow Theological Seminary which existed within Moscow Theological Academy.

On 25 February 1984 Masendych was consecrated by BishopSerapion (Fadeyev) of Vladimir and Suzdal, as a hieromonk. In 1985 hieromonk Anthony was invited by Archbishop Gedeon (Dokukin) of Novosibirsk and Barnaul, to become a parson of church of Demetrius of Thessaloniki in a town of Aleysk. In 1986 hieromonk Antoniy became hegumen. In 1989 he the Achinsk temple and enrolled to the Moscow Theological Academy.

In 1990 along with Metropolitan Gedeon (Dokukin), Antoniy moved to the Diocese of Stavropol and Baku where he became a dean over the Christian Orthodox parishes of Azerbaijan and a parson of the Baku Nativity of Mary church in rank of archimandrite. Soon the same year Archimandrite Anthony was dismissed from the staff.

=== Ukrainian church ===
In 1990 he was invited by former bishop-emeritus John (Bodnarchuk) who recently was defrocked from the Russian Orthodox Church by leading the revival movement of the Ukrainian Autocephalous Orthodox Church to serve in parishes of the reviving church. On 16 September 1990 Archimandrite Anthony was ordained as Bishop of Rivne and Zhytomyr (Ukrainian Autocephalous Orthodox Church) by Metropolitan John (Bodnarchuk) and bishops Volodymyr (Romaniuk) and Daniel (Kovalchuk).

On 1 December 1990 Bishop Anthony was appointed by Patriarch Mstyslav (Skrypnyk) as a head of Patriarchal office. In July 1991 he was appointed as a chairman of the Church department of foreign relations receiving a title of Archbishop of Kyiv. On 25 January 1992 Archbishop Antoniy was appointed Metropolitan of Pereyaslav and Sicheslav.

Following consultations with government officials, in June 1992 Metropolitan Anthony finally agreed to unification with the Ukrainian Orthodox Church which was in crisis due to unsanctioned assembly of bishops and election of new primate from outside of the church.

== Bishops he onsecrated ==
- Peter (Petrus)
- Sophronius (Vlasov)
- Roman (Popenko)
- Michael (Dutkevych)
