= Macarius Maletych =

Ukrainian Eastern Orthodox bishop

His Eminence Macarius
- Metropolitan of Lviv
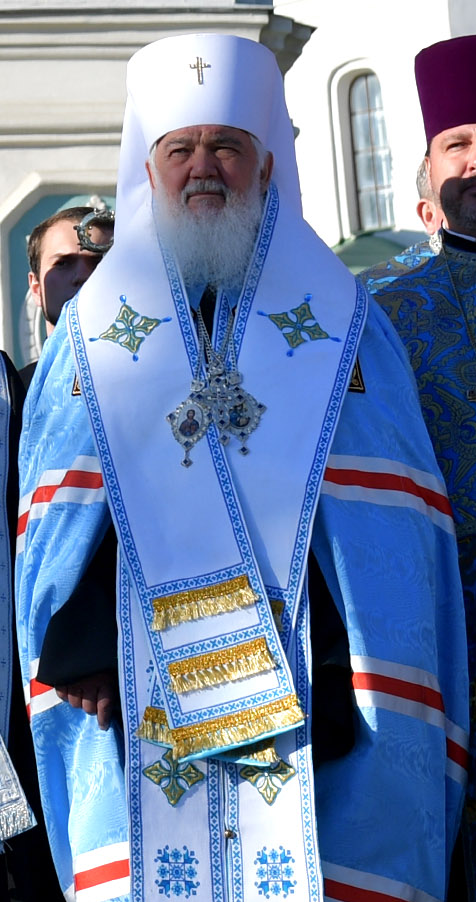
- Metropolitan Macarius (13 October 2018)
- Native name: Макарій
- Church: Orthodox Church of Ukraine
- See: Lviv
- Installed: 15 December 2018
- Previous posts: Bishop (later Archbishop) of Lviv (UAOC) (1996-2015); Metropolitan of Kyiv and All Ukraine (UAOC) (2015-2018)

Orders
- Ordination: 10 August 1975
- Consecration: 3 November 1996 by Dymytriy (Yarema)

Personal details
- Born: Mykola Ivanovych Maletych; Микола Іванович Малетич; October 1, 1944 (age 82) Krasne, Turka Raion, Drohobych Oblast, Ukrainian SSR
- Education: Moscow Theological Academy

Metropolitan Macarius (Ukrainian: Митрополит Макарій, romanized: Mytropolyt Makarii, secular name: Mykola Ivanovych Maletych, Ukrainian: Микола Іванович Малетич) (b. 1 October 1944) is a bishop of the Orthodox Church of Ukraine (OCU) and a permanent member of the Standing Holy Synod of the OCU. His full title is His Eminence Macarius, Metropolitan of Lviv.

Prior to the Unification Council in December 2018, he was the Primate of the Ukrainian Autocephalous Orthodox Church (UAOC), a jurisdiction that did not have recognition on the part of other Eastern Orthodox churches; he was restored to full ecclesiastical communion with the Patriarchate of Constantinople by the decision of the Holy Synod of the Ecumenical Patriarchate of Constantinople in October 2018. However, this has been accepted only by the churches of Alexandria, Greece, and in part Cyprus.

== Biography ==
In 1973 and then again in 1974, he tried and failed to enroll at the Odesa Theological Seminary of the Russian Orthodox Church (ROC). On 10 August 1975, he was ordained a priest within the jurisdiction of the ROC. He served mainly in Ukraine and the Rostov region.

In 1982, he finished the Moscow Theological Academy (ROC).

In 1989, he resigned from the canonical Ukrainian Orthodox Church (Moscow Patriarchate) and became associated with the schismatic Ukrainian Autocephalous Orthodox Church (UAOC).

From November 1996, he was a governing bishop of the Lviv diocese of the UAOC and then he also took over jurisdiction over the Volyn dioceses. In 2011, Makary was raised to the dignity of the Metropolitan of Lviv.

Following the death of the Primate of the UAOC, Metropolitan Methodius (Kudriakov), in February 2015, Makary was elected Locum Tenens of the Metropolitan Throne of the Ukrainian Autocephalous Orthodox Church. On 4 June 2015, he was elected as Metropolitan and the new Primate of the Ukrainian Autocephalous Orthodox Church.

At the Unification Council in Kyiv on 15 December 2018, Metropolitan Macarius, along with the bishops, priests, and laity of the UAOC, joined the OCU, a new, canonical ecclesiastical body that was in January 2019 granted autocephaly by the Ecumenical Patriarchate of Constantinople. He went on to become a permanent member of the Standing Holy Synod of the OCU.

On 5 January 2020, he headed the delegation of the OCU to the residence of the Ecumenical Patriarch of Constantinople in Istanbul and concelebrate the Divine Liturgy with Patriarch Bartholomew I marking the first anniversary of the OCU's autocephaly. He formally invited Patriarch Bartholomew on behalf of the Primate of the OCU, Epiphanius of Kyiv, to visit Ukraine.
