= Mefodiy Sribnyak =

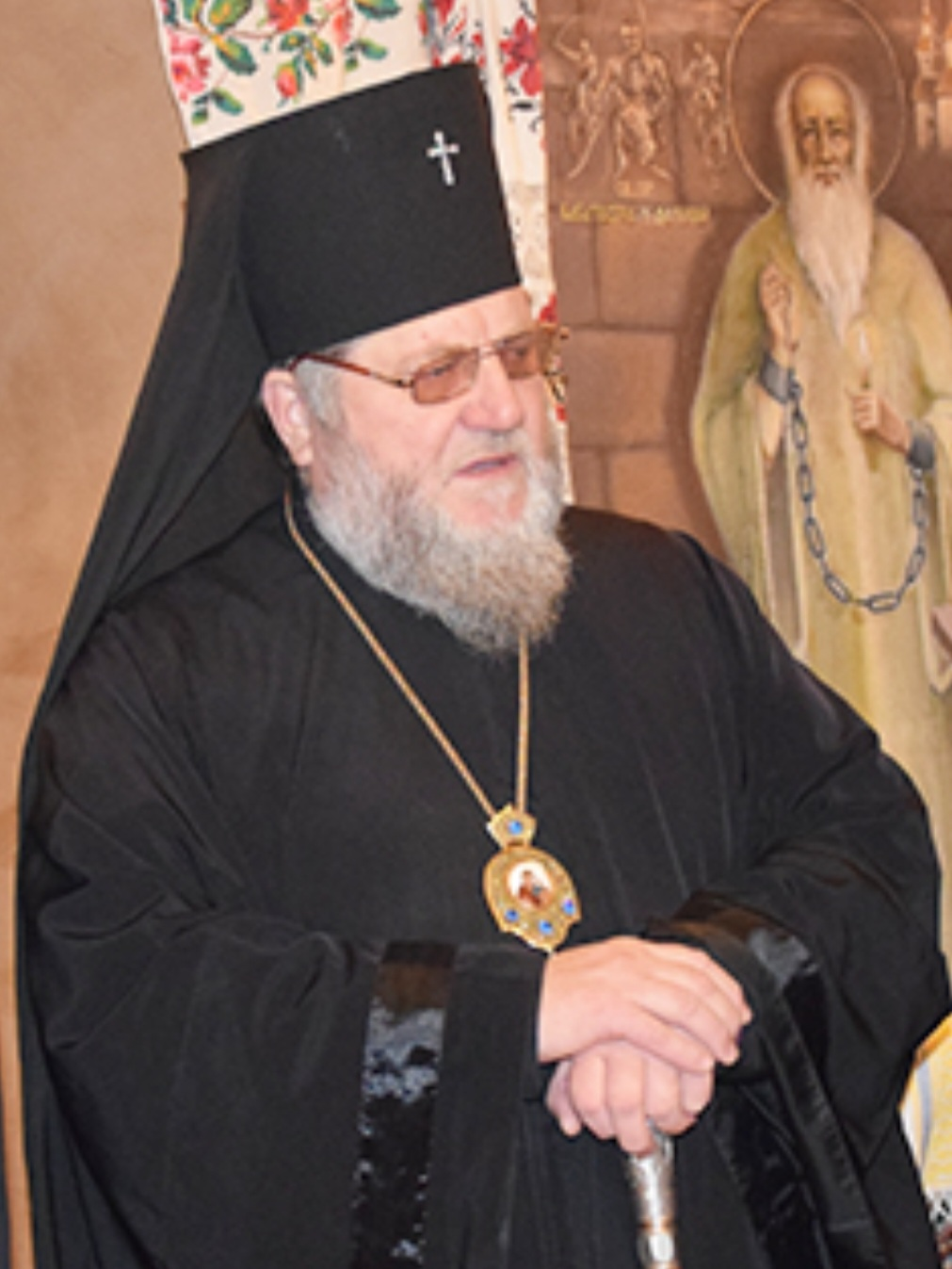
Image of Mefodiy

Archbishop Mefodiy (Mykola Mykolaiovych Sribnyak born 8 June 1957, Hrabivka) is the archbishop of Sumy and Okhtyrka UOC KP. He was an activist of Ukrainian diaspora of eastern Siberia (1992–1995).

== Biography ==
Mefodiy was born in the village of Hrabivka, Kalush Raion, Ivano–Frankivsk Oblast. When he was young he moved to Siberia. From 1978 to 1986, he has worked as a forester and older one in Krasnoyarsk (Russian Federation). In 1985, he graduated from Siberia Institute of Technology.

From 1986 until 1992, he worked as a deputy of director at the Irkutsk medical center. Mykola studied at the medical college, then in Irkutsk medical institute, which he didn't finish because he went to Ukraine in 1994.

From 1992 to 1994, he was the head of Irkutsk Ukrainian people's association coming from the same area. In 1995, Sribnyak became a deacon in the Bohoyavlensky cathedral in Noginsk at first, then he was a priest.

From 1996 until May 2004, he was a secretary of Dnipropetrovsk – Kryvyi Rih eparchy. At the same time he was the dean of the Holy Spirit's temple in Dnipropetrovsk. This person studied in the Noginsk theological seminary, some time later – in Volyn theological seminary, which graduated in 1999.

In 2004, he graduated from Lviv theological academy.

On 14 May 2004 he was elected the Sumy and Okhtyrka bishop by Sacred Synod of Ukrainian Orthodox Church of the Kyivan Patriarchate.

On 6 June 2004 he was consecrated as a bishop in Kyiv St Volodymyr's Cathedral.

On 2 February 2006 he was temporarily appointed to lead Chernihiv eparchy pluralistically and led until 13 May 2008.

== Rewards ==
He is conferred of higher church rewards: the Order of Yuriy Peremozhets (14 December 2006). On 23 January 2012 he was acknowledged in the holy order of archbishop by Holy Patriarch Filaret's decree.
