= Methodius Kudriakov =

Autocephalous Orthodox Metropolitan of Kyiv and all Ukraine (1949–2015)

Metropolitan Mefodiy (Kudryakov)
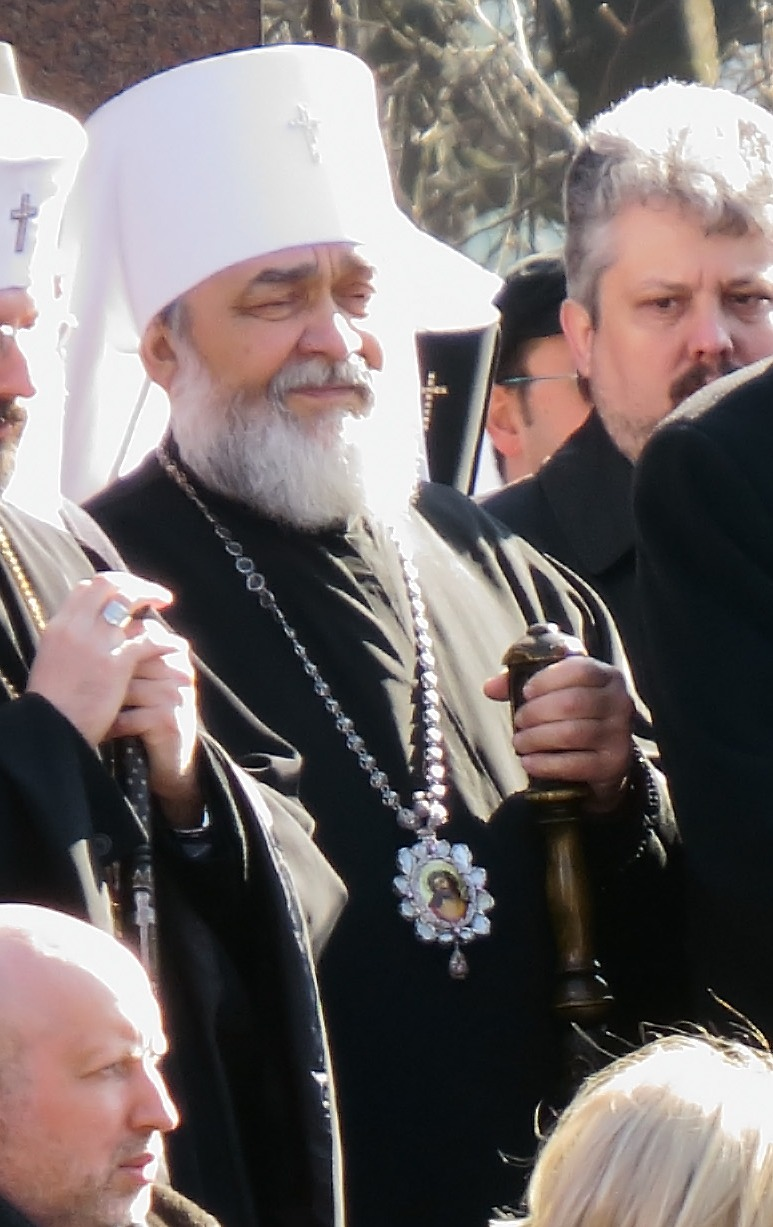
- Metropolitan Mefodiy (Kudriakov)
- Born: 11 March 1949; Kopychyntsi, Ternopil Oblast, Ukrainian SSR, Soviet Union
- Died: February 24, 2015 (aged 65); Kyiv, Ukraine
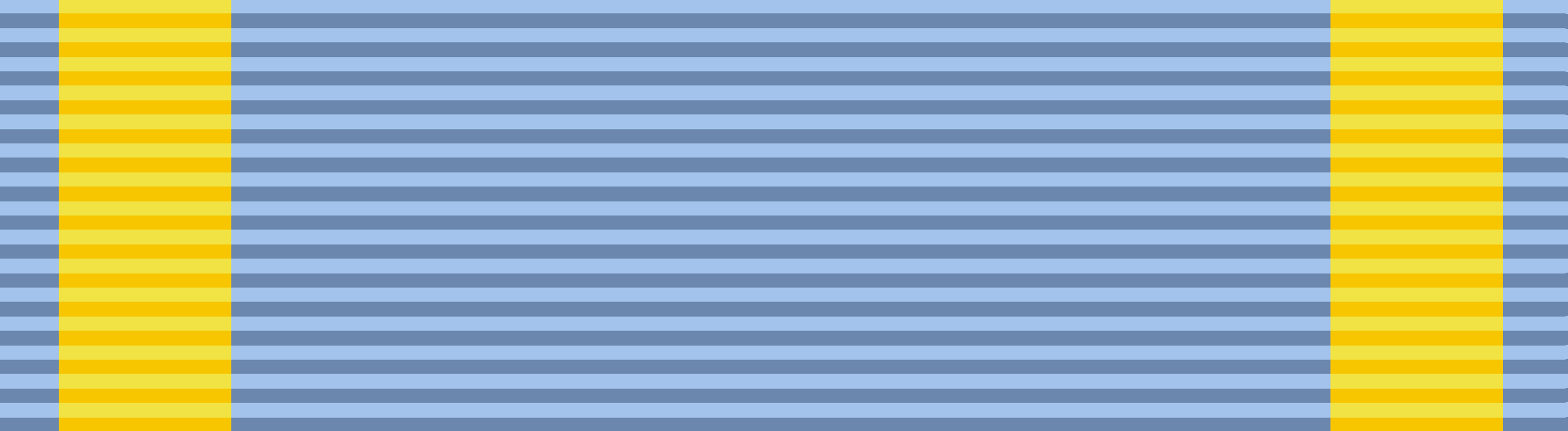
- Awards

Metropolitan Mefodiy (born Valeriy Andriyovich Kudryakov, Ukrainian: Валерій Андрійович Кудряков; 11 March 1949 – 24 February 2015, Kyiv, Ukraine) was the Primate of the Ukrainian Autocephalous Orthodox Church, Metropolitan of Kyiv and all Ukraine.

== Biography ==
Valeriy Kudryakov was born in Kopychyntsi, Husiatyn Raion, Ternopil Oblast, Ukrainian SSR.

In 1969–71 he was in the Soviet Army. Later, in 1977–81 he studied at the Moscow Theological Seminary.

On June 27, 1981 Metropolitan of Lviv and Ternopil Nicholas (Yurik) ordained Kudryakov to be a celibate deacon, and on the next day he was ordained as a priest.

In 1985 Valeriy Kudriakov appointed him to the position of Dean in the Ternopil region. In 1986 he entered the extramural department of the Moscow Theological Academy in Zagorsk.

In 1987 by the decree of his eparchial bishop, Metropolitan Nykodym (Rusnak), Valeriy Kudriakov as a supporter of autocephalous status of the Ukrainian Church was banned from undertaking any church activity and performing any priestly function in public.

In 1989 the eparchial bishop lifted the ban and Valeriy Kudriakov again was listed among the clergy of the Lviv and Ternopil diocese.

In 1990 he joined the Ukrainian Autocephalous Orthodox Church. In 1993 he was tonsured with the name Methodius (after the Apostle Methodius, Slavonic teacher (869)). In 1995 he was appointed a chancellor of the Office of His Holiness Patriarch of Kyiv and All Rus-Ukraine Volodymyr (1993–95).

On June 17, 1995 Patriarch of Kyiv and All Rus-Ukraine Volodymyr and Bishop of Donetsk and Lugansk Iziaslav (Cargo) ordained Mefodiy bishop of Khmelnitsky and Kamenetz-Podolsk.

On October 19, 1995, after the death of Patriarch of Kyiv and All Rus-Ukraine Volodymyr, bishop Mefodiy confessed the jurisdiction of the Ukrainian Autocephalous Orthodox Church. In 1997 he was ordained archbishop, and in 1999, metropolitan of Ternopil and Podil. His consecration was performed by Patriarch Volodomyr (Romaniuk) and bishop Izyaslav of Donetsk and Luhansk.

In 1998 he rejoined the Ukrainian Autocephalous Orthodox Church. This church was resurrected at the end of the Soviet period by Metropolitan Ioann (Bodnarchuk) and Bishop Vikentiy (Chekalin).

On March 1, 2000 by the decision of the IV Local Council of Ukrainian Autocephalous Orthodox Church Mefodiy was elected Locum Tenens of the UAOC Patriarch throne.

On 16 October 2000, at the Church Sobor of the UAOC, Metropolitan Mefodiy was elected Primate of the Ukrainian Autocephalous Orthodox Church.

On 2002 at the urging of Ukrainian Autocephalous Orthodox Church Bishops' Council, Mefodiy assumed the title of "Metropolitan of Kyiv and All Ukraine."

As Father & Head of the UAOC worldwide, Mefodiy is Metropolitan of Kyiv & all Ukraine. Since his elevation, he has worked towards global visibility for the church, including a pastoral visits to the United States in 2006 and traveled to Western Europe. He has fostered continued positive relations with the Ukrainian government and other religious communities.

In 2005, Metropolitan Mefodiy pursued a legal suit which successfully restored the patriarchal chancery offices and the Church of Saint Demetrius of Thessaloniki to the UAOC. Located adjacent to the famous St. Michael's Golden-Domed Monastery, the premises had been in the use of a schismatic group.

Under the personal supervision of Metropolitan Mefodiy, the Ternopil Orthodox Theological Academy of the Ukrainian Autocephalous Orthodox Church was renovated and its course of studies completely updated to conform to contemporary academic standards. On October 18, 2008, the first diplomas of the newly accredited theological school were awarded to qualified graduates in a ceremony in the Cathedral of the Nativity of Christ in Ternopil.

Through the efforts of Metropolitan Meofidy, the Patriarchal Cathedral of the UAOC, the historic Church of St. Andrew the First-Called in Kyiv was returned by the Ukrainian government to the legal possession of the UAOC on May 21, 2008. Prior to the transfer of the title to the UAOC Patriarchate, the church had been part of the historic reserve park "Sofia-Kyiv" while being used for services of the Ukrainian Autocephalous Orthodox Church.

On February 24, 2015 on 66th year of life, due to illness, Mefodiy died in Kyiv. On February 27, 2015 he was buried in the territory of the Church of the Nativity in Ternopil.

Memory Foundation for His Beatitude Metropolitan Mefodiy was established by closest associates of His Beatitude: his testamentary executor mitered archpriest father Roman Budzynskyi and his First Assistant Natalia Shevchuk. Main goals of the Foundation are processing and publication of works of Metropolitan Mefodiy, creation of museum of modern UAOC history in Ternopil and popularisation of Metropolitan Mefodiy' ideas.

On May 24, on the evening in memory of His Beatitude Metropolitan Mefodiyin Ternopil, the book "One Nation, one Languane, one Church", edited by Memory Foundation for His Beatitude Metropolitan Mefodiy, has been presented. The book by His Beatitude Methodios includes articles and scientific studies, that analyze the main event of the church history in twentieth century in Ukraine: the recovery of the autocephalous Ukrainian Church and the proclamation of the Kyiv Patriarchate.

In many documents written by His Beatitude Metropolitan Mefodiy or under his direct supervision, the historical and canonical reasons of contemporary canonical Ukrainian Orthodox crisis reveals, the key mistakes of the autocephalous movement are identified and ways to overcome them and to enter the communion with the Ecumenical Patriarchate of Constantinople are proposed.

== Awards ==
- Order of Prince Yaroslav the Wise, 5th class (July 22, 2008).
- Order of Merit 1st Class of Ukraine (March 10, 2009).
- Order of Merit 2nd Class of Ukraine (May 15, 2003).
- Order of Merit 3rd Class of Ukraine (August 21, 2001).

Eastern Orthodox Church titles
| Preceded by Patriarch Dymytriy (Yarema) | Metropolitan and the Head of UAOC in Ukraine; 2000–2015 | Succeeded by Metropolitan Makariy (Maletych) |
