= Andrew Abramchuk =

Ukrainian bishop (born 1949)

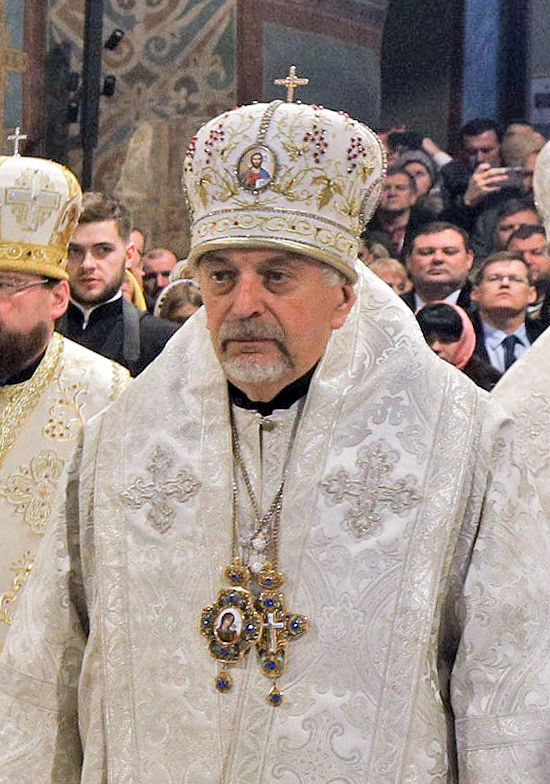
- in 2019
- Church: Orthodox Church of Ukraine
- Diocese: Halychyna (Galicia)
- See: Ivano-Frankivsk
- Predecessor: new post

Orders
- Ordination: 7 April 1990 (bishop) by Ioann Bodnarchuk (UAOC)
- Consecration: 21 January 1974 (priest) by Sergiy Petrov (Ukrainian Exarchate)
- Rank: Metropolitan

Personal details
- Born: Stepan Vasylyovych Abramchuk; January 21, 1949 Tysmenytsia, Stanislav Oblast, Ukrainian SSR, Soviet Union
- Denomination: Eastern Orthodox
- Residence: Ivano-Frankivsk
- Education: Moscow Theological Academy (1982)

Metropolitan Andrew (Ukrainian: Андрій (Абрамчук); secular name: Stepan Vasylyovych Abramchuk; born 21 January 1949) is a metropolitan bishop of Halychyna of the Orthodox Church of Ukraine. Since 1990, he has been the longest-serving diocesan bishop of the Ukrainian Orthodox Church (Orthodox Church of Ukraine).

== Brief biography ==
Metropolitan Andrew (Abramchuk) was born Stepan Vasylyovych Abramchuk in Tysmenytsia, Stanislav Oblast on 21 January 1949. He was born to a family of worker Vasyl Abramchuk and Rozalia (nee Shiliak). In 1964 he received his secondary education diploma from a school in Tysmenytsia and 1968 he graduated a vocational school in Horodenka (both cities in Ivano-Frankivsk Oblast). Until 1971, Stepan Abramchuk worked at the Tysmenytsia Agrarian Equipment facility. He graduated from the Odesa Theological Seminary (1974) and Moscow Theological Academy (1982).

He was consecrated by Metropolitan Sergij of Odesa as a protopriest (protoiereus) on 21 January 1974. In 1983-88 he provided pastoral care among patriarchal parishes of the Russian Orthodox Church in Canada. Since 1988 he was carried out services of parochial priest of the Ivano-Frankivsk cathedral temple. In 1990 decided to join the movement for reestablishment of own Ukrainian church and officially announced about leaving the ranks of the Russian Orthodox Church. On 7 April 1990 he was tonsured as Andrew and ordained by Ioann (Bodnarchuk), Basil (Bodnarchuk) and Vikentiy Chekalin (who claimed to be a member of the Russian Catacomb Church) as a bishop of Ivano-Frankivsk and Kolomyia of the Ukrainian Autocephalous Orthodox Church with which stayed for over 30 years. Since 1990 the Russian Orthodox Church implemented sanctions against him by prohibiting him to carry out any religious services.

According to the Russian Orthodox Church, soon in April of 1990, Andrew Abramchuk was given a title of Metropolitan of Halychyna and Ivano-Frankivsk. However, in reality Andrew Abramchuk was awarded title of archbishop at the 1990 UAOC All-Ukrainian Local Council in June and his title of Metropolitan he received from Patriarch Mstyslav of Kyiv in January of 1992.

On 25 June 1992 Metropolitan Andrew joined the newly established Ukrainian Orthodox Church – Kyivan Patriarchate (created few days before through unification of UAOC and UOC). In fall of 1995 he returned to the revived Ukrainian Autocephalous Orthodox Church. On 19 February 1996 the Patriarch Demetrius of Kyiv awarded Metropolitan Andrew a second Panagia (a type of vestment) "for contribution to the development of the Ukrainian Orthodox Church and 25 years of service as a priest".

During 2000, he was not allowed to serve as a bishop by the Bishop Council of the UAOC and the Patriarch Demetrius of Kyiv.

== Problems with ordination ==
Along with Basil (Bodnarchuk), Metropolitan Andrew became one of bishops of the Ukrainian church whose ordination was criticized by the Russian Orthodox as such that is not in accordance with canon law. Serhii Shumylo who specializes in history of churches stated that it is difficult to prove authenticity of certain documents proving ordination of bishops by Ioann Bodnarchuk and Basil Bodnarchuk. Legitimacy of his ordination was also placing in question legitimacy of the Ukrainian Church. Along with Basil (Bodnarchuk) and Peter (Petrus), he refused to be re-ordained by Philaret (Denysenko).

At the same time, there are also an ukase of the Metropolitan Mstyslav of Kyiv of 29 November 1990 as well as a note from the Council on Religious Affairs of the Council of Ministers of the Ukrainian SSR which all confirm the appointment of Andrew Abramchuk to be a diocesan bishop at the Ivano-Frankivsk Eparchy (later Eparchy of Halychyna). There is also a recommendation letter with signatures from the clergy of the eparchy dated 19 March 1990 to appoint Stepan Abramchuk a bishop.

== Honours and awards ==
- Order of Prince Yaroslav the Wise, 5th class (2008) — for a significant personal contribution to the development of spirituality in Ukraine, many years of fruitful church activity and on the occasion of the 1020th anniversary of the baptism of Kyivan Rus
- Order of Merit, 2nd class (2019) — for a significant contribution to the strengthening of spirituality, mercy and interfaith harmony, significant personal merits in the development of an independent Orthodox Church of Ukraine, many years of conscientious service to the Ukrainian people
- Order of Merit, 3rd class (2003) — for a significant personal contribution to the revival of spirituality, the establishment of ideas of mercy and harmony in society, active peacemaking and charitable activities
