= Ihor Isichenko =

Ukrainian bishop

His Excellency, The Most Reverend Ihor Isichenko
- Archbishop Emeritus
- Archbishop Ihor in 2025
- Church: Ukrainian Greek Catholic Church
- Archdiocese: Ukrainian Catholic Archiepiscopal Exarchate of Kharkiv
- Previous posts: Archbishop of Kharkiv and Poltava (UAOC)

Orders
- Ordination: Janurary 4, 1993
- Consecration: July 12, 1993 by Metropolitan Peter of Lviv (UAOC)

Personal details
- Born: Yuriy Anriyovych Isichenko; January 28, 1956 (age 70) Muraptal, Bashkir ASSR, Russian SFSR

Ihor Isichenko (Ukrainian: Ігор Ісіченко; from his birth name Yuriy Anriyovych Isichenko, Юрій Андрійович Ісіченко; born 28 January 1956 in Bashkir ASSR), is a Ukrainian religious and public figure and a former Eastern Orthodox archbishop, who converted to Catholicism in 2020. Isichenko played a key role in the revival and development of the Ukrainian Autocephalous Orthodox Church during its critical period in the mid-1990s. Since 2018, he has been a member of PEN Ukraine.

== Biography ==
Ihor Isichenko was born in 1956 to a family of a construction laborer in the Bashkir ASSR, Russian SFSR. The same year, his family moved back to Ukraine, the city of Balakliya, near Kharkiv. In 1979, Isichenko graduated from the Kharkiv State University of Maksim Gorkiy, specializing in Ukrainian language and literature. Since 1981, he has been a lecturer at the Kharkiv National University at the university's department of the history of Ukrainian literature. At the Shevchenko Institute of Literature (Academy of Sciences of the Ukrainian SSR) in 1987, Isichenko defended his dissertation titled as the Kyiv Caves Patericon in the literary process of the late 16th and early 18th centuries in Ukraine. In 1990, it was published by Naukova Dumka.

Ihor Isichenko was Archbishop of the Diocese of Kharkiv - Poltava (north-eastern Ukraine) between 1993 and 2020, of the Ukrainian Autocephalous Orthodox Church. He is professor emeritus at the National University of Kharkiv, specialist in medieval literature and in relations between Catholics and Orthodoxes.

In 2020, Isichenko converted to Catholicism and joined, together with 3 parishes of his former diocese, the Ukrainian Greek Catholic Church. According to him, that decision was influenced by the disbandment of the Ukrainian Autocephalous Orthodox Church, as well as increasing state intervention in church affairs.

In 2022, he retired with the title of Archbishop Emeritus, and went to work within the Ukrainian Catholic University. He was made an honorary doctor of this university on 9 July 2022.

== Awards ==
- Order "For Intellectual Courage" (2008)

== Main publications ==
- Isichenko Yu. A. Kyiv-Pechersk paterik in the literary process of the late 16th and early 18th centuries. in Ukraine. — K.: Nauk. dumka, 1990. — 180 p.
- Ihor Isichenko, archbishop. History of the Church of Christ in Ukraine: Synopsis of lectures for students of theological schools. — Kharkiv, 1999. — 265 p.
- Ihor Isichenko, archbishop. Ascetic literature of Kievan Rus. - Kharkiv: Akta, 2005. - 374 p.
- Ihor Isichenko, archbishop. Conversations on the edge of millennia. — Kharkiv-Lviv, 2008.
- Ihor Isichenko, archbishop. History of Ukrainian literature: the Baroque era of the XVII-XVIII centuries. : [learning manual for university students]; National Kyiv-Mohylyan University. Acad.". — Lviv; Kyiv; Kharkiv: Svyatogorets, 2011. — 566, [1] p. — Bibliography: pp. 551-567 and in the subsection. approx. UDC : 821.161.2.09”16/17”(091)(075.8).
- Ihor Isichenko, archbishop. Encounters on Life's Path: A Popular Catechism for Young People. – Lviv; Kharkiv: Svyatogorets, 2013. – 144 p.
- Ihor Isichenko, archbishop. Watch over the lamp: The message. Reports. Articles. – Kharkiv; Lviv: Svyatogorets, 2013. – 416 p.
- Ihor Isichenko, archbishop. General church history: Textbook for higher theological schools. — Kharkiv: Akta, 2014. — 601 p .
- Ihor Isichenko, archbishop. Ancient Egyptian monasticism. — Kharkiv: Akta, 2014. — 214 p.
- Ihor Isichenko, archbishop. History of the Church of Christ in Ukraine. — Kharkiv: Akta, 2014. — 760 p .
- Ihor Isichenko, archbishop. Ascetic literature of Kievan Rus. — Kharkiv: Akta, 2014. — 386 p. BBK : Sh43(4UKR)(=411.1){4}”X - XVIII century.”*401+ Sh43(4UKR)(=411.1){4}”X - XVIII century.”*414.2+ E37-438-341
- Ihor Isichenko, archbishop. Kyiv-Pechersk paterik in the literary process of the late 16th - early 18th centuries. in Ukraine. - 2nd edition. - Kharkiv: Akta, 2015. - 248 p.
- Ihor Isichenko, archbishop. Spiritual dimensions of the baroque text: Literary studies. - Kharkiv: Akta, 2016. - 580 p.
- Ihor Isichenko, archbishop. War of baroque metaphors. Petr Mohyla's "Stone" against Kasiyan Sakovich's "Spyglass". - Kharkiv: Akta, 2017. - 348 p.
- Ihor Isichenko, archbishop. On the rock of the Word: Sermons on Sundays and transitional holidays (2011–2015). – Lviv: Svichado, 2017. – 440 p.
- Ihor Isichenko, archbishop. We were just walking: Memories. - Kharkiv: Akta, 2018. - 598; [14] with ISBN 978-966-8917-27-1.
