= Feodosiy Petsyna =

Feodosiy Petsyna (Ukrainian: Феодосiй Пецина; 6 April 1950 – 23 July 2010) was an archbishop in the Ukrainian Orthodox Church.

From 1994 to 2006, Petsyna was the Archbishop of Drohobych and Sambir in the Patriarchate of Kiev. From 2007 until his death, he held the same title in the Ukrainian Autocephalous Orthodox Church.
