= Basil Bodnarchuk =

Ukrainian Orthodox metropolitan bishop

Basil
- Metropolitan of Ternopil and Buchach
- Church: Ukrainian Orthodox Church – Kyivan Patriarchate; Ukrainian Autocephalous Orthodox Church
- Installed: 31 March 1990
- Term ended: 21 January 2006
- Predecessor: new position
- Successor: Nestor (Pysyk)

Orders
- Ordination: 1960 by Eumenius (Khorolsky)
- Consecration: 31 March 1990 by Ioann (Bodnarchuk) (UAOC)

Personal details
- Born: Ivan Mykolayovych Bodnarchuk; 28 January 1925 Ivane-Puste, Tarnopol Voivodeship, Poland
- Died: 21 January 2006 (aged 80) Ukraine

Metropolitan Basil (Bodnarchuk) (28 January 1925 – 21 January 2006) was a metropolitan bishop of the Ukrainian Orthodox Church – Kyivan Patriarchate of Ternopil and Buchach. Before 1997 he also participated in revival of the Ukrainian Autocephalous Orthodox Church (UAOC).

== Biography ==
Metropolitan Basil was born Ivan Bodnarchuk in village of Ivane-Puste, Tarnopol Voivodeship, Poland. In 1942 he completed his secondary education and in 1942-1944 studied at trade vocational school in Borshchiv. Since September of 1942 he was a member of the Organization of Ukrainian Nationalists (Banderite) with pseudonym "Arkhyp".

With liberation of western parts of Ukraine and arrival of the Soviet authorities, on 9 July 1945 Bodnarchuk was arrested and on 13 November sentenced by the Military Tribunal of Chortkiv city to 10 years of imprisonment and 5 years of deprivation of all civil rights. He served his sentence first in Kharkiv Factory "Serp and Molot" until 1946 and then in the city of Norilsk, Krasnoyarsk Krai. On 27 November 1954 he was released and in 1957 enrolled in the Saratov Theological Seminary.

In 1960, he was ordained a priest by Archbishop of Zhytomyr Eumenius (Khorolsky). Until 1965, he served as a priest in the village of Krylivka, Andrushivka Raion, Zhytomyr Oblast; until 1968 — in the village of Yaseniv-Pilny, Horodenka Raion, Ivano-Frankivsk Oblast; until 1978 — in the village of Stryivka, Zbarazh Raion, Ternopil Oblast; until 1987 — in the city of Truskavets, Drohobych Raion, Lviv Oblast; until 1990 - in the village Mykhaylevichi, Drohobych Raion, Lviv Oblast.

=== Ukrainian church ===
On 30 March 1990 Bodnarchuk was tonsured as monk in Mykhaylevychi, with the name Basil (Vasyl). The next day he was consecrated as a bishop by his younger brother Metropolitan of Lviv and Galicia Ioann (Bodnarchuk), Bishop of Simferopol and Crimea Barlaam (Ilyushchenko), Bishop of Yasnaya Poliana Vikenti (Chekalin). In 1990 Bishop Basil was appointed to the diocese of Ternopil and Buchach by the Holiest Patriarch of Kyiv and all Ukraine Mstyslav (Skrypnyk). In 1991 Patriarch Mstyslav paid a visit to Ternopil diocese of Bishop Basil, particularly Ternopil, Kremenets and Pochaiv and laid the cornerstone for the construction of the Holy Trinity Cathedral in Pidvolochysk.

On 19 October 1997 Bishop Basil along with his diocese switched to the Ukrainian Orthodox Church – Kyivan Patriarchate where he served until his death in 2006. During his service Metropolitan Basil ordained over 300 priests and consecrated over 100 temples.
