= Volodymyr Romaniuk =

Ukrainian bishop and patriarch

Volodymyr I
- Holiest Patriarch of Kyiv and all Rus-Ukraine
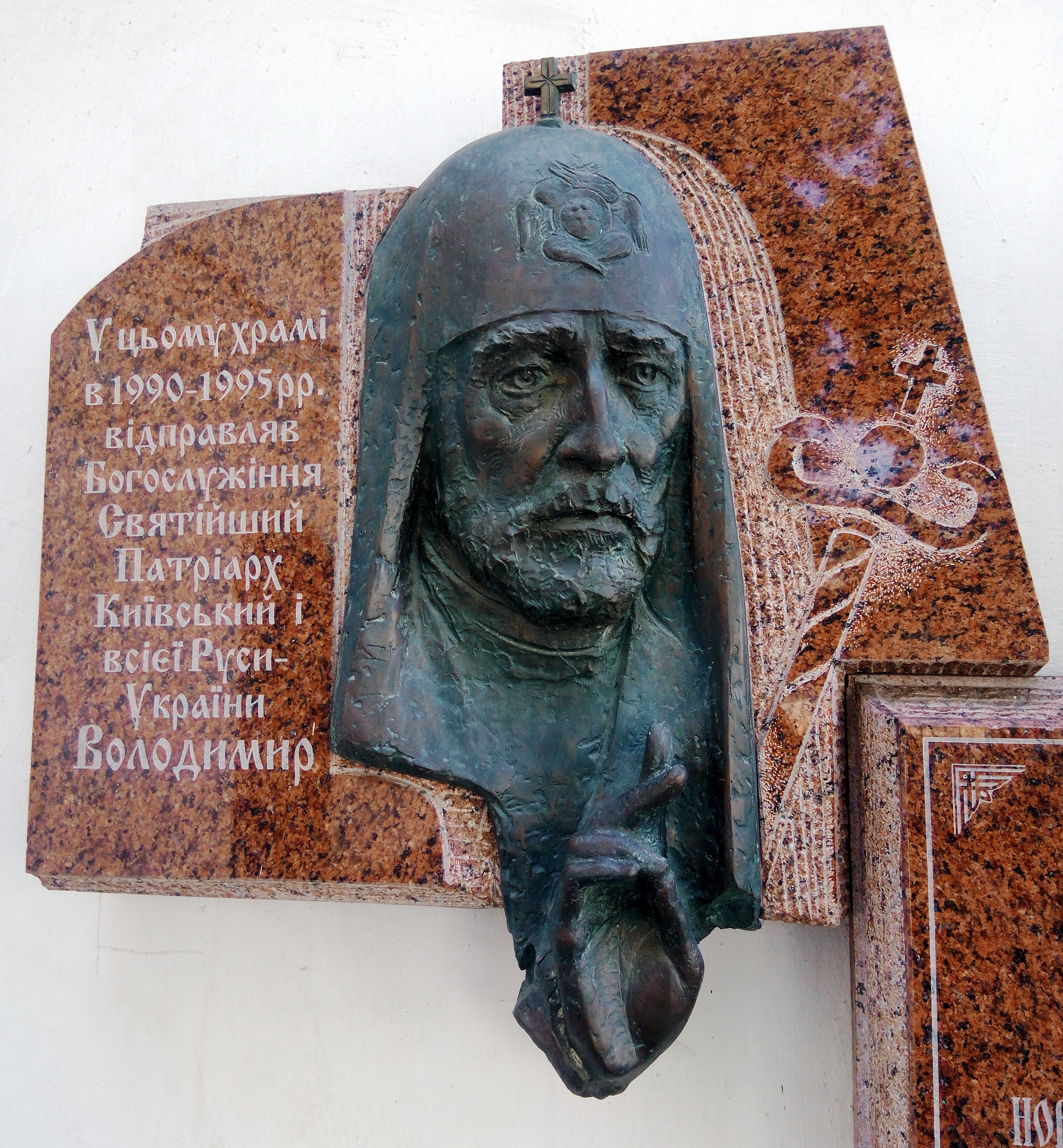
- Memorial plaque to Patriarch Volodymyr on the facade of the Holy Protection Church in Kyiv
- Native name: Володимир І
- Church: Ukrainian Orthodox Church
- See: Kyivan Patriarchate
- Elected: 22 October 1993 (by All-Ukrainian Orthodox Assembly)
- Installed: 24 October 1993 (at Saint Sophia's Cathedral)
- Term ended: 14 July 1995
- Predecessor: Mstyslav
- Successor: Filaret
- Other posts: Locum tenens of Patriarchal throne, Metropolitan (1993); Archbishop of Lviv and Sokal (Lviv diocese, 1993)

Orders
- Ordination: 28 April 1990 by Ioan (Bodnarchuk)
- Consecration: 29 April 1990 by Ioan (Bodnarchuk)

Personal details
- Born: Vasyl Omelianovych Romaniuk; 9 December 1923 Chomczyn, Poland (now Khimchyn, Ukraine)
- Died: 14 July 1995 (aged 71) Botanic Garden, Kyiv, Ukraine
- Buried: Sofia Square (Sofiyivska plochsha), Kyiv
- Denomination: Eastern Orthodox
- Spouse: Maria Antonyuk (1920–1987)
- Children: Taras Romaniuk
- Education: Moscow Theological Academy

Volodymyr (secular name Vasyl Omelianovych Romaniuk, (Note: In this name that follows East Slavic naming customs, the patronymic is Omelianovych and the family name is Romaniuk.) Ukrainian: Василь Омелянович Романюк; 9 December 1923 – 14 July 1995) was a Ukrainian Eastern Orthodox priest and human rights activist who was Patriarch of the Ukrainian Orthodox Church – Kyiv Patriarchate from its founding until his death. Prior to becoming patriarch, he had been a prisoner of conscience and one of the leaders of the Ukrainian Helsinki Group.

== Biography ==
Vasyl Omelianovych Romaniuk was born on 9 December 1923 into a Hutsul family in the village of Khimchyn, in what was then the Second Polish Republic. During World War II, he studied at Kosiv within the General Government and was a member of the Organisation of Ukrainian Nationalists operating underground in opposition to the German occupation. Following the recapture of Kosiv by the Red Army, Romaniuk was arrested for his nationalist activities on 12 July 1944. His family was deported to Siberia while he was sentenced to 20 years' imprisonment. He served out his sentence in Poltava Oblast.

Romaniuk was again imprisoned during the 1972–1973 Ukrainian purge and sentenced to ten years' imprisonment for anti-Soviet agitation. He was recognised as a prisoner of conscience by Amnesty International.

In 1979 he became a member of the Ukrainian Helsinki Group, was exiled from 1979 till 1982, and became a political emigrant at the end of the 1980s. On 1 July 1976 Volodymyr renounced his Soviet citizenship.

Between 1987 and 1990, Vasyl Romaniuk lived in Canada and was a priest of the Ukrainian Orthodox Church of Canada. He also served under the Ukrainian Orthodox Church of the USA, whose Metropolitan was Metropolitan Mstyslav (later Patriarch of Kyiv). In 1990 with the onset of Perestroyka and movement for revival of the Ukrainian Autocephalous Orthodox Church, he returned to Ukraine.

In April 1990 he was tonsured as an archimandrite selecting name of Volodymyr and next day consecrated as Bishop of Uzhhorod and Vynohradiv. His cheirotonia was carried out by Metropolitan of Lviv and Galicia Ioann (Bodnarchuk), bishop of Ternopil and Buchach Basil (Bondarchuk), bishop of Ivano-Frankivsk Andrew (Abramchuk), bishop of Chernivtsi Daniel (Kovalchuk). His speedy consecration of bishop was not something special and similar method was widely practiced in the Russian Orthodox Church.

For a short period, he was Archbishop of Lviv and Sokal.

On 22 October 1993 he was elected Patriarch of the Ukrainian Orthodox Church – Kyiv Patriarchate.

== Death and funeral ==
On 14 July 1995 Patriarch Volodymyr suddenly died under somewhat mysterious circumstances, with the official diagnosis being causes related to a heart attack.

Volodymyr's burial, on 18 July 1995, turned into a riot. The Ukrainian Orthodox Church (Moscow Patriarchate), which controlled Saint Sophia Cathedral in Kyiv (with support from the Kuchma Ukrainian Government), refused a request from the Kyiv Patriarchate Orthodox Church to bury him on the cathedral's grounds. Kyiv Patriarchate officials, flanked and supported by uniformed paramilitary guards of the UNA-UNSO nationalist movement, broke through the sidewalk asphalt outside the cathedral gates and buried him there. The Berkut riot police came out from the gates of the Cathedral and attacked the assembly and fighting with Volodymyr's supporters left about 70 people injured. Although an official inquiry was later made, no prosecutions were made. Many religious faithful later called the event Black Tuesday.

Patriarch Volodymyr (Romaniuk) was succeeded by Metropolitan Filaret (Denysenko) who was enthroned as Patriarch of Kyiv and All Rus’ - Ukraine on October 22, 1995.

== Awards ==
- Order for Courage 1st class (8 November 2006).

== Notes ==
Preceded by Mstyslav (Skrypnyk)	Patriarch of Kyiv and all Rus-Ukraine (Ukrainian Orthodox Church of the Kyivan Patriarchate); 1993–1995	Succeeded by Filaret (Denysenko)
Preceded by Polikarp (Pakholyuk)	Metropolitan of Chernihiv and Sumy (Ukrainian Orthodox Church of the Kyivan Patriarchate); 1993	Succeeded by Varlaam (Pylypyshyn)
Preceded by	Archbishop of Lviv and Sokal (Ukrainian Orthodox Church of the Kyivan Patriarchate); 1993	Succeeded by
Preceded by	Archbishop of Bila Tserkva (vicar of Kyiv Eparchy) (Ukrainian Autocephalous Orthodox Church); 1991–1993	Succeeded by
Preceded by	Bishop of Uzhhorod and Vynohradiv (Ukrainian Autocephalous Orthodox Church); 1990–1991	Succeeded by
