= Demetrius Yarema =

Dymytriy
- Patriarch
- Church: Ukrainian Autocephalous Orthodox Church
- See: Kyiv
- Installed: 14 October 1993
- Term ended: 25 February 2000
- Predecessor: Mstyslav
- Successor: Mefodiy

Orders
- Ordination: 10 August 1947 by Macarius (Oksiyuk)
- Consecration: 5 September 1993 by Petro (Petrus)

Personal details
- Born: Volodymyr Vasylyovych Yarema; 9 December 1915 Hłudno, Austro-Hungarian Empire
- Died: 25 February 2000 (aged 84) Kyiv, Ukraine

Patriarch Dymytriy (Yarema) (9 December 1915 – 25 February 2000) was the second patriarch of Kyiv and all Ukraine, and of the Ukrainian Autocephalous Orthodox Church (UAOC). Patriarch Dymytriy (Yarema) was successor to Patriarch Mstyslav (Skrypnyk) from 1993 to 2000 and was succeeded by Metropolitan Mefodiy (Kudryakov).

== Biography ==
He was a renaissance man who had studied art and music in his younger years, a leader with a developed political consciousness who was a member of the Organization of Ukrainian Nationalists in the 1930s.

During World War II he was a prisoner of war in Germany. He was ordained to the diaconate on August 3, 1947, and to the priesthood on August 10 of that same year. In 1947–89 he was a member of the clergy of the Moscow Patriarchate. In 1989 he and the other members of the clergy left the Moscow Patriarchate and declared to be put under the omophor of the Ukrainian Autocephalous Orthodox Church under Metropolitan Mstyslav (Skrypnyk) who was at that time the head of the Ukrainian Autocephalous Orthodox Church in USA and Canada.

By 1990, with the Soviet Union falling apart, The Right Rev Fr. Dymitry Yarema initiated and was a participant in the first All-Ukrainian Sobor of the UAOC, held in Kyiv in 1990, which elected Metropolitan Mstyslav as the first patriarch of Ukraine.

In 1993 he took his monastic vows and then was ordained bishop of Pereyaslav and Sicheslav by Archbishop of Lviv Petro (Petrus). At the 2nd Council of the Church in 1993 he was voted Patriarch of Kyiv and all Rus’-Ukraine.

In late 1998 the aging Patriarch Dymytriy, his health weakening, determined that the future of the Church would be strengthen if it would turn once again to the Ukrainian diaspora, which had maintained the UAOC during nearly 70 years of Communist rule in Ukraine.

The choice Patriarch Dymytriy made in his last will and testament to request that the UAOC hierarchy agree to allow Metropolitan Constantine of the Ukrainian Orthodox Church of the USA to guide it – which, if carried out, would effectively unite the two Churches – was a calculated move to save the UAOC from further incursions from the larger Ukrainian Orthodox Church - Kyiv Patriarchate, and the Ukrainian Orthodox Church (Moscow Patriarchate).

| Preceded by Patriarch Mstyslav (Skrypnyk) | Patriarch of Kyiv and all Ukraine (UAOC); 1993–2000 | Succeeded by Metropolitan Mefodiy (Kudryakov) |
