= Ukrainian Orthodox Church – Kyiv Patriarchate =

Unrecognized Eastern Orthodox church

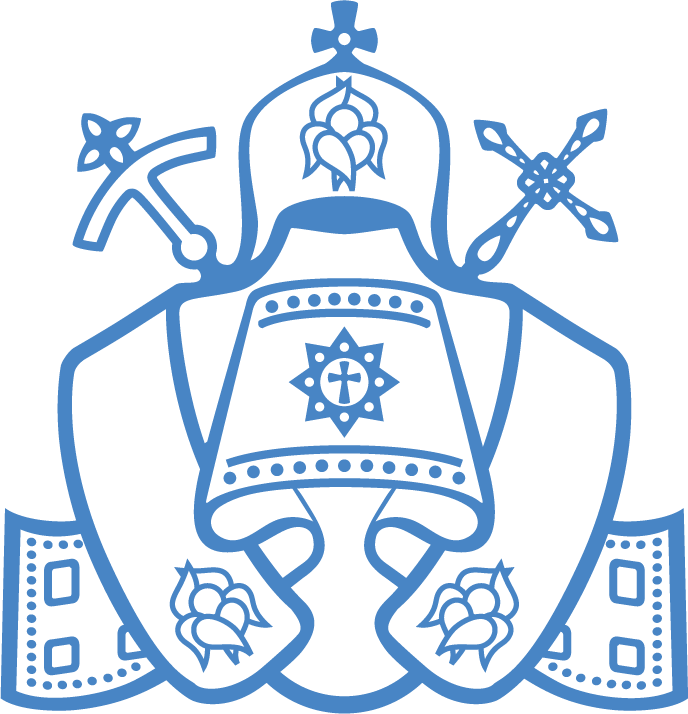
- Abbreviation: UOC-KP
- Type: Eastern Orthodox
- Classification: Independent Eastern Orthodox (2019–Present)
- Primate: Patriarch Nykodym
- Language: Ukrainian, Church Slavonic
- Headquarters: Sumy, Ukraine
- Territory: Ukraine
- Founder: Metropolitan Filaret (Denysenko)
- Independence: 2019
- Separated from: Orthodox Church of Ukraine (2019 & 2026)
- Merged into: Orthodox Church of Ukraine (2018)
- Defunct: 15 December 2018 (Reneged and re-established since 2019)
- Members: less than 100,000 (2019);~ below 1500 (2026)
- Official website: Ukrainian Orthodox Church

The Ukrainian Orthodox Church – Kyiv Patriarchate (UOC-KP; Ukrainian: Украї́нська Правосла́вна Це́рква – Ки́ївський Патріарха́т (УПЦ-КП), romanized: Ukrainska Pravoslavna Tserkva — Kyivskyi Patriarkhat (UPTs-KP)) is an Eastern Orthodox church.

After its unilateral declaration of autocephaly in 1992, the UOC-KP was not recognised by the other Eastern Orthodox churches, and was considered a "schismatic group" by the Moscow Patriarchate. Patriarch Filaret (Denysenko) was enthroned in 1995 and excommunicated by the Russian Orthodox Church in 1997, an action not recognized by the UOC-KP synod. In 2018, the Ecumenical Patriarchate of Constantinople reinstated Filaret as a bishop and facilitated the convening of a unification council. In December 2018, the unification council of the Eastern Orthodox churches of Ukraine decided to unite the UOC-KP with the Ukrainian Autocephalous Orthodox Church (UAOC), creating the Orthodox Church of Ukraine (OCU) which was subsequently granted autocephaly by the Ecumenical Patriarch of Constantinople in January 2019.

A conflict between Filaret and Epiphanius, the Metropolitan of the OCU following the December 2018 unification council, erupted and resulted in Filaret claiming continuation of the UOC-KP on 20 June 2019. That church, however, is not currently recognized by, or in communion with any of the mainstream Eastern Orthodox churches that are members of Eastern Orthodoxy.

== History ==
The Kyiv Patriarchate considers itself an independent church, a successor of the Metropolis of Kyiv and all Rus which existed under the Ecumenical Patriarchate until 1686 (when it was incorporated into the Moscow Patriarchate of the Russian Orthodox Church). In January 1992, after Ukraine became an independent state during the dissolution of the Soviet Union, Metropolitan of Kyiv Filaret convened an assembly at the Kyiv Pechersk Lavra which submitted a request for Ukrainian autocephaly to the Moscow Patriarch. The Moscow Patriarch did not comply.

== Primates ==
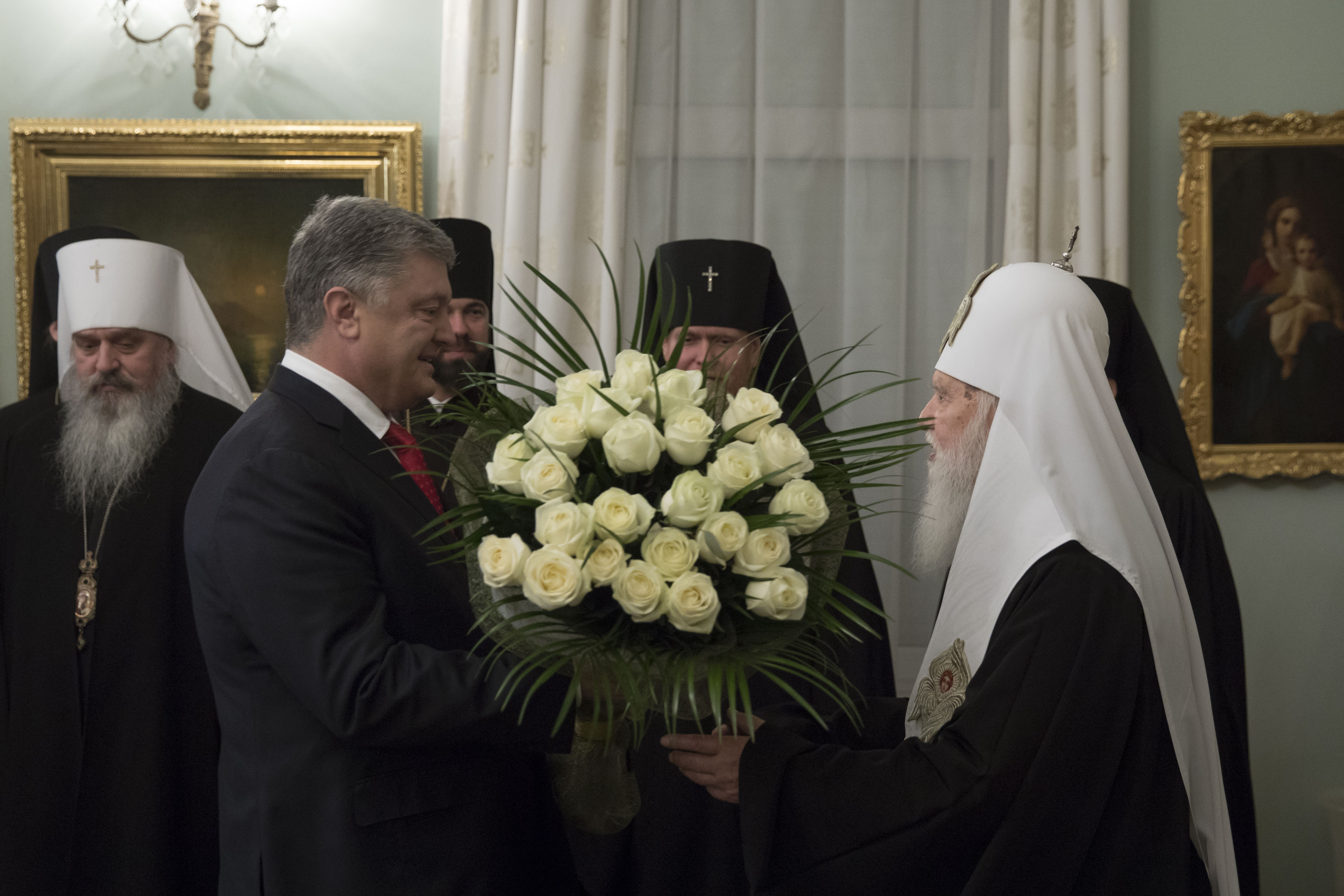
Patriarch Filaret with Ukrainian President Petro Poroshenko, 21 October 2018

In November 1991 the all-Ukrainian sobor of the Ukrainian Orthodox Church, called by Metropolitan Filaret Denysenko, issued a request to the patriarch of Moscow for the autocephaly of the Ukrainian church. The sobor of the ROC held in April 1992 refused that request and decided to replace Metropolitan Filaret with Volodymyr Sabodan. In response to this, at the all-Ukrainian sobor in June 1992 one part of the Ukrainian Orthodox church, led by Metropolitan Filaret, decided to separate from the ROC and unite with the Ukrainian Autocephalous Orthodox Church (UAOC) to form the Ukrainian Orthodox Church-Kyiv Patriarchate under Patriarch Mstyslav. Mstyslav never approved of the union of the UAOC and the UOC-KP.

Patriarch Mstyslav (Stepan Ivanovych Skrypnyk) was Patriarch of Kyiv and all Rus’-Ukraine and primate of the Ukrainian Autocephalous Orthodox Church (UAOC) and Ukrainian Orthodox Church – Kyiv Patriarchate (UOC–KP) from 1991 to 1993. After Mstyslav's death in 1993, the temporary union ended and the Ukrainian Orthodox Church – Kyiv Patriarchate and the Ukrainian Autocephalous Orthodox Church separated. The primates of the Ukrainian Orthodox Church–Kyiv Patriarchate continued to hold the title of patriarch:

- Patriarch Filaret (Filaret Denysenko), (2019–2025) (Returned to a canonical Church in 2025 December)
- Patriarch Nikodimos ( Nikodimos Kobzar), (2026–present)

On 20 October 2018, the UOC-KP changed the title of its primate to "His Holiness and Beatitude (name), Archbishop and Metropolitan of Kyiv – Mother of the Rus Cities and of Galicia, Patriarch of All Rus-Ukraine, Holy Archimandrite of the Holy Assumption Kyiv-Pechersk and Pochayiv Lavra". The abridged form is "His Holiness (name), Patriarch of Kyiv and All Russia-Ukraine", and the form for inter-church relations is "Archbishop, Metropolitan of Kyiv and All Rus'-Ukraine". Metropolitan Hilarion called the bestowal of title a "farce".

=== Dioceses ===
- Belgorod
- Kherson
- Odesa
- Sumy
- Eastern Moldavia

=== Exarchates and vicariates ===
- Exarchate in Greece
- Mexican and Pan-American Eparchy
- Vicariate in Australia
- Cyprus Vicariate
- Czech Vicariate
- Vicariate of Italy & Portugal

=== Direct Patriarchal Subordinations ===
- Uganda: The Parish of Saint Joseph
- Romania: The Monastery of All Saints in the village of Sagasa.

== See also ==
- Bulgarian Alternative Synod
- Eastern Orthodox Church organization
- Montenegrin Orthodox Church
- Orthodox Church in America
- Orthodox Church in Italy
