= Eparchies of the Orthodox Church of Ukraine =

As of 2022, the Orthodox Church of Ukraine is subdivided into forty-five eparchies:

Many eparchies were established in the beginning and mid 1990s as part of the Ukrainian autocephalous religious movement initiated in 1989 during the fall of the Soviet Union and with the help of the Ukrainian diaspora.

== Existing eparchies ==
#	Eparchy	Previous jurisdiction (Note: before the 2018 union)	Established	Bishops	Cathedral/Center
1	Eparchy of Bila Tserkva	own	2023	Archbishop Yevstratiy (Zoria)	Transfiguration Cathedral, Bila Tserkva
2	Eparchy of Cherkasy	UOC-KP	1992	Bishop Nestor (Kulish); Metropolitan Ioan (Yaremenko)	Holy Trinity Cathedral, Cherkasy
3	Eparchy of Chernihiv	UAOC→UOC-KP	1990 (Note: It was among the first eparchies of the Ukrainian Autocephalous Church, which in 1992 became part of the UOC-KP.)	Archbishop Roman (Balashchuk); Bishop Polikarp (Pakholyuk); Metropolitan Volodymyr (Romaniuk); Bishop Varlaam (Pylypyshyn); Bishop Nykon (Kalember); Bishop Mykhayil (Zinkevych); Bishop Feodosiy (Paikush); Bishop Sevastian (Vozniak); Bishop Ilarion (Protsyk); Archbishop Yevstratiy (Zorya); Archbishop Antoniy (Filrey)	Catherine's Church, Chernihiv
4	Eparchy of Chernivtsi	UAOC→UOC-KP	1990 (Note: It was among the first eparchies of the Ukrainian Autocephalous Church, which in 1992 became part of the UOC-KP.)	Metropolitan Danyil (Kovalchuk); Metropolitan Ioasaf (Vasylykiv)	Cathedral of Saint Paraskeva of Serbia, Chernivtsi
5	Eparchy of Crimea	UOC-KP	1996	Bishop Antoniy (Makhota); Metropolitan Klyment (Kushch)	Simferopol (Note: Due to the occupation of Crimea, the eparchial administration received the approval from the Holy Synod to change its location on 13 July 2025.)
6	Eparchy of Dnipropetrovsk	UOC-KP	1993	Archbishop Spyrydon (Babskyi); Archbishop Adrian (Staryna); Archbishop Symeon (Zinkevych)	Cathedral of the Icon of the Mother of God, Dnipro
7	Eparchy of Donetsk	UOC-KP	1993 (Note: Existed since 1992, it was vacant until 1993.)	Bishop Polikarp (Huts); Bishop Izyaslav (Karha); Bishop Ioann (Zynovyev); Bishop Ioasaf (Vasylykiv); Bishop Volodymyr (Polishchuk); Archbishop Yuriy (Yurchyk); Metropolitan Serhiy (Horobtsov)	Mariupol
8	Eparchy of Donetsk and Sloviansk	UAOC	2017 (Note: Existed since 1991, it was vacant until 2017.)	Bishop Sava (Fryziuk)	St. Andrew's Cathedral, Sloviansk
9	Eparchy of Drohobych and Sambir	UOC→UOC-KP	1990 (Note: Following the 1992 Kharkiv schism and the 1992 unification council, the original "Lviv—Drohobych" eparchy ruled by bishop Andriy was split between two bishops, Andriy and Volodymyr. Bishop Andriy, who was the previously ruling bishop of the Lviv—Drohobych eparchy, became the ruling bishop of the Drohobych—Sambir eparchy, while Archbishop Volodymyr became the ruling bishop of the Lviv—Sokal eparchy.)	Bishop Andriy (Horak); Metropolitan Ioann (Bodnarchuk); Archbishop Feodosiy (Petsyna); Bishop Matfei (Shevchuk); Bishop Mykhayil (Bondarchuk); Archbishop Yakiv (Makarchuk)	Streetensky Cathedral, Drohobych
10	Eparchy of Ivano-Frankivsk	UAOC	1990 (Note: In 1992, the eparchy also joined the UOC-KP, but in 1995, it became among the first to support the revival of the UAOC and remained so until the 2018 unification council.)	Metropolitan Andriy (Abramchuk)	Holy Intercession Cathedral, Ivano-Frankivsk
11	Eparchy of Ivano-Frankivsk and Halych	UOC-KP	1996 (Note: Following the reinstatement of the UAOC, a separate eparchy within the UOC-KP, which remained vacant until 1997.)	Bishop Volodymyr (Polishchuk); Metropolitan Ioasaf (Vasylykiv)	Holy Trinity Cathedral, Ivano-Frankivsk
12	Eparchy of Kamianets-Podilskyi	own	2024 (Note: The eparchy is considered a successor of the Eparchy of Khmelnytskyi (UAOC), which was created in 1991. For an extended time, it remained vacant and was sometimes ruled by troubled bishops. In 2024, it was created after the reduction of eparchies in Chernivtsi Oblast. Previous bishops of the Eparchy of Khmelnytskyi (UAOC): Antoniy (Fialko) and Adrian (Kulyk).)	Archbishop Herman (Semanchuk)	Temple of the Holy Apostol and Evangelist John, The Theologian, Kamianets-Podilskyi
13	Eparchy of Kharkiv	UOC-KP	1999	Bishop Flavian (Pasichnyk); Bishop Lavrentiy (Myhovych); Archbishop Mytrofan (Butynskyi)	Cathedral of the Transfiguration of the Lord, Kharkiv
14	Eparchy of Kharkiv and Poltava	UAOC	1992	Bishop Roman (Popenko); Archbishop Ihor (Isichenko); Bishop Lavrentiy (Myhovych); Archbishop Afanasiy (Shkurupiy)	Cathedral of St. Michael the Archangel, Poltava
15	Eparchy of Kherson	UOC-KP	1997 (Note: It was created in 1997, after the 1997 Kherson religious scandal, when the Kherson city parish, which was part of the Russian Church, protested against the ruling bishop and was accepted into the Ukrainian Church.)	Archbishop Damian (Zamarayev); Bishop Nykodym (Kulyhin)	Cathedral of the Ascension of the Lord, Kherson
16	Eparchy of Khmelnytskyi	UOC-KP	1992	Bishop Ioan (Siopko); Bishop Stefan (Ladchuk); Bishop Mefodiy (Kudriakov); Metropolitan Antoniy (Makhota); Archbishop Pavlo (Yurystyi); Metropolitan Symeon (Shostatsky)	St. Andrew's Cathedral, Khmelnytskyi
17	Eparchy of Kolomyia	UOC-KP	1997	Bishop Ioan (Boychuk); Bishop Yulian (Hatala)	Transfiguration Cathedral, Kolomyia
18	Eparchy of Kyiv	UOC→UOC-KP	1990 (Note: Following the 1992 Kharkiv schism, the metropolitan eparchy of Kyiv, ruled by Metropolitan Filaret (Denysenko), became the metropolitan eparchy of the United Ukrainian church, and the metropolitan see was reserved for the diasporan Hierarch Mstyslav, who led the UAOC. Patriarch Mstyslav refused the honor. During the 2018 unification council, arrangements were made for Metropolitan Filaret to stay as a ruled bishop of his eparchy, however due to arguments between Metropolitans Filaret and Epiphanius, the arrangements were canceled, and the eparchy was restructured.)	Metropolitan Filaret of Ukraine reservation for Patriarch Mstyslav of Ukraine; Patriarch Volodymyr of Ukraine; Patriarch Filaret of Ukraine; Metropolitan Epiphanius of Ukraine	St. Michael's Golden-Domed Monastery, Kyiv
19	Eparchy of Kropyvnytskyi	UOC-KP	1992	Bishop Mykhayil (Dutkevych); Archbishop Serafym (Verzun); Bishop Mark (Levkiv)	Kropyvnytskyi
20	Eparchy of Luhansk	UOC-KP	2000	Bishop Vsevolod (Matviyevskyi); Bishop Tykhon (Petranyuk); Bishop Afanasiy (Yavorskyi); Bishop Lavrentiy (Myhovych)	Holy Trinity Cathedral, Luhansk
21	Eparchy of Lviv	UAOC	1989	Metropolitan Ioann (Bodnarchuk); Metropolitan Petro (Petrus); Metropolitan Makariy (Maletych)	Dormition Church, Lviv
22	Eparchy of Lviv and Sokal	UOC-KP	1993	Archbishop Volodymyr (Romaniuk); Metropolitan Andriy (Horak); Metropolitan Dymytriy (Rudiuk)	Cathedral of the Intercession of the Holy Mother of God, Lviv
23	Eparchy of Mykolaiv	UAOC→UOC-KP	1991	Bishop Panteleimon (Romanovskyi); Bishop Varsonofiy (Mazurak); Bishop Oleksiy (Tsaruk); Metropolitan Volodymyr (Ladyka)	Cathedral of the Kasperovo Icon of the Mother of God, Mykolaiv
24	Eparchy of Mukachevo and Carpathians	UAOC	2015	Bishop Viktor (Begy)	Cathedral of the Ukrainian Apostle Andrew the First-Called, Uzhhorod
25	Eparchy of Odesa	UOC-KP	1993	Bishop Stefan (Ladchuk); Archbishop Nestor (Kulish); Archbishop Ioann (Zynovyev); Archbishop Serafym (Verzun); Bishop Payisiy (Dmokhovskyi); Archbishop Yakiv (Makarchuk); Bishop Mark (Hrynchevskyi); Bishop Pavlo (Yurystyi); Archbishop Afanasiy (Yavorskyi)	Cathedral of the Nativity of Christ, Odesa
26	Eparchy of Pereiaslav and Vyshneve	UOC-KP	2009	Metropolitan Dmytriy (Rudyuk); Metropolitan Epifaniy (Dumenko); Metropolitan Oleksandr (Drabynko)	Savior and Transfiguration Cathedral, Kyiv
27	Eparchy of Poltava	UOC-KP	2002	Metropolitan Yevseviy (Politylo); Bishop Mykhayil (Bondarchuk); Metropolitan Fedir (Bubniuk)	Cathedral of the Assumption of the Mother of God, Poltava
28	Eparchy of Rivne	UAOC→UOC-KP	1990	Bishop Antoniy (Masendych); Bishop Polikarp (Pakholyuk); Archbishop Roman (Balashchuk); Archbishop Serafym (Verzun); Metropolitan Danyil (Chokalyuk); Metropolitan Yevseviy (Politylo); Metropolitan Ilarion (Protsyk)	Holy Resurrection Cathedral, Rivne
29	Eparchy of Rivne and Volhynia	UAOC	1996 (1990) (Note: Following the 1992 unification council, the UAOC lost jurisdiction in both of its eparchies in Volhynia. In 1996, the eparchy of Rivne was reinstated, and later in 1997, the vacant eparchy of Lutsk was merged into it. Soon after the merger in 1997, the eparchy became vacant until 2018. Bishops of the Eparchy of Lutsk (UAOC): Mykolai (Hrokh) and Feoktyst (Peresada).)	Bishop Ioan (Boychuk); Bishop Havryil (Kryzyna)	Cathedral of the Ascension of Christ, Rivne
30	Eparchy of Sumy	UOC-KP	1996	Bishop Herontiy (Khovanskyi); Bishop Mykhayil (Zinkevych); Archbishop Mefodiy (Sribnyak)	Holy Resurrection Cathedral, Sumy
31	Eparchy of Taurida	UAOC	1992 (Note: Created in 1992, the eparchy remained vacant until 2015.)	Bishop Borys (Kharko)	Saint Michael's Church, Lazurne
32	Eparchy of Ternopil	UOC-KP	1992 (Note: In 1995, the eparchy was divided into the Eparchy of Ternopil and Buchach (UOC-KP) and the Eparchy of Ternopil and Kremenets. In 2012, the two eparchies were merged again. Bishops of the Eparchy of Kremenets: Yakiv (Panchuk) and Iov (Pavlyshyn).)	Metropolitan Vasyliy (Bodnarchuk); Metropolitan Nestor (Pysyk)	Cathedral of Saints Equal-to-the-Apostles Constantine and Elena, Ternopil
33	Eparchy of Ternopil and Buchach	UAOC	1990	Bishop Vasyliy (Bodnarchuk); Metropolitan Mefodiy (Kudriakov); Archbishop Mstyslav (Huk); Archbishop Tykhon (Petraniuk)	Cathedral of the Nativity of Christ, Ternopil
34	Eparchy of Ternopil and Terebovlia	UOC-KP	2009	Archbishop Pavlo (Kravchuk)	Chortkiv
35	Eparchy of Uzhhorod and Khust	UAOC	1990 (Note: Created in 1990, the Eparchy of Zakarpattia was vacant in 1991 – 2014.)	Bishop Volodymyr (Romaniuk); Bishop Kyrylo (Mykhailiuk)	Cathedral of the Twelve Apostles, Uzhhorod
36	Eparchy of Vinnytsia and Bar	UOC-MP	2018	Metropolitan Symeon (Shostatsky); Bishop Pavlo (Yurystyi)	Transfiguration Cathedral, Vinnytsia
37	Eparchy of Vinnytsia and Tulchyn	UOC-KP	1992	Bishop Sofroniy (Vlasov); Bishop Volodymyr (Ladyka); Bishop Pankratiy (Tarnavskyi); Archbishop Herontiy (Khovanskyi); Archbishop Onufriy (Khavruk); Metropolitan Mykhayil (Bondarchuk)	Cathedral of the Immaculate Conception of Our Lord Jesus Christ, Vinnytsia
38	Eparchy of Vinnytsia and Bratslav	UAOC	1995	Metropolitan Roman (Balashchuk)	Cathedral of the Icon of the Mother of God, Vinnytsia
39	Eparchy of Volhynia	UOC-KP	1992	Archbishop Spyrydon (Babskyi); Bishop Serafym (Verzun); Metropolitan Ioann (Bodnarchuk); Metropolitan Yakiv (Panchuk); Metropolitan Mykhail (Zinkevych)	Holy Trinity Orthodox Cathedral, Lutsk
40	Eparchy of Volodymyr-Volynskyi	UOC-KP	2017	Archbishop Matfei (Shevchuk)	Cathedral of the Nativity of Christ, Volodymyr
41	Eparchy of Vyshhorod	own	2024 (Note: Created in 2024, the Eparchy of Vyshhorod was proclaimed a successor of the Eparchy of Kyiv (UAOC). Bishops of Kyiv (UAOC): Mstyslav of Ukraine, Demetrius of Ukraine, Methodius of Ukraine, Macarius of Ukraine.)	Archbishop Agapitus (Humenyuk)	
42	Eparchy of Zakarpattia	UOC-KP	2003	Bishop Kyrylo (Mykhailiuk); Bishop Varsonofiy (Rudnik)	Cathedral of Venerable Amfilochius of Pochaiv, Uzhhorod
43	Eparchy of Zhytomyr and Ovruch	UAOC→UOC-KP	1992	Bishop Serafym (Verzun); Archbishop Izyaslav (Karha); Bishop Paisiy (Kukharchuk)	St. Michael's Cathedral, Zhytomyr
44	Eparchy of Zhytomyr and Polissia	UAOC	1992	Bishop Sofroniy (Vlasov); Bishop Ioan (Boychuk); Archbishop Volodymyr (Shlapak)	Cathedral of St. Equal-to-the-Apostle Mary Magdalene, Zhytomyr
45	Eparchy of Zaporizhzhia	UOC-KP	1996	Archbishop Hryhoriy (Kachan); Bishop Fotiy (Davydenko)	Cathedral of the Holy Trinity, Zaporizhzhia

== Important vicariates ==
The Orthodox Church of Ukraine has at least two vicar bishops who assist the Metropolitan of Kyiv and lead national communities in Ukraine.

- Vicar Bishop of Olbia (Greek communities)
- Vicar Bishop (Romanian communities)

== Liquidated or not registered ==
- Eparchy of Dnipropetrovsk and Zaporizhzhia (UAOC) - not registered
- Eparchy of Cherkasy and Kirovohrad (UAOC) - not registered (Bishops: Yakiv (Makarchuk), Bohdan (Kulyk), Ilarion (Savchuk))
- Eparchy of Lviv and Sambir (UAOC) - not registered
- Eparchy of Odesa and Black Sea (UAOC) - unofficial (Bishops: Bohdan (Kulyk), Tykhon (Petranyuk))
- Eparchy of Bilhorod-Dnistrovskyi - not registered (it was reserved for Bishop of East Moldova)
- Eparchy of Korsun - not registered (it was reserved for Metropolitan of Paris)
- Eparchy of Chernivtsi and Kitsman - merged with the Eparchy of Chernivtsi and Bukovyna (Bishops: Nykon (Kalember), Varlaam (Pylypyshyn), Mark (Hrynchevskyi), Onufriy (Khavruk))
- Eparchy of Chernivtsi and Khotyn (UAOC) - merged with the Eparchy of Chernivtsi and Bukovyna (Bishop: Herman (Semanchuk))

=== Transformed ===
- Eparchy of Khmelnytskyi (UAOC) → Eparchy of Kamianets-Podilskyi
- Eparchy of Kyiv (UAOC) → Eparchy of Vyshhorod

=== Abandoned extra-jurisdictional eparchies ===
- Eparchy of Bogorodsk (UOC-KP) - abandoned, based near Moscow in Noginsk
- Eparchy of Belgorod (UOC-KP) - abandoned, based Belgorod
- East Moldovan Eparchy (UOC-KP) - turned to the Romanian Orthodox Church
- Eparchy of Paris (UOC-KP), abandoned, based in Paris
- Eparchy of Korsun (UOC-KP), abandoned (Greece)

== See also ==
- List of bishops of the Orthodox Church of Ukraine
- Eparchies and Metropolitanates of the Russian Orthodox Church
- Eparchies of the Romanian Orthodox Church
- Eparchies of the Serbian Orthodox Church
- List of Catholic dioceses (structured view)
