= Patriarch of Kyiv =

Patriarch of Kyiv may refer to:

- Patriarch of the former Ukrainian Orthodox Church - Kyiv Patriarchate
- Patriarch of the former Ukrainian Autocephalous Orthodox Church - Kyiv Patriarchate
- Patriarch of the Ukrainian Autocephalous Orthodox Church - Canonical, head of a distinctive church in Ukraine
- Patriarch of the Ukrainian Orthodox Greek Catholic Church, head of a distinctive church in Ukraine
- Head of the Ukrainian Greek Catholic Church or, unofficially, Ukrainian Greek Catholic Patriarch of Kyiv

== See also ==
- Archeparchy of Kyiv (disambiguation)
- Bishop of Kyiv (disambiguation)
- Eparchy of Kyiv (disambiguation)
- List of metropolitans and patriarchs of Kyiv
- Metropolitan of Kiev and all Rus'
- Patriarchate of Kyiv (disambiguation)
