= Patriarchate of Kyiv =

Patriarchate of Kyiv may refer to:

- Ukrainian Orthodox Church – Kyiv Patriarchate, former Eastern Orthodox church body in Ukraine, until 2018
- Ukrainian Autocephalous Orthodox Church, former Eastern Orthodox church body, until 2018
- Patriarchate of the Ukrainian Autocephalous Orthodox Church - Canonical, a distinctive church body in Ukraine
- Ukrainian Greek Catholic Church, an Eastern Catholic church body whose head is recognized as Major Archbishop but self-proclaimed Patriarch

== See also ==
- Patriarch (disambiguation)
- Patriarch of Kyiv (disambiguation)
- Archeparchy of Kyiv (disambiguation)
- Bishop of Kyiv (disambiguation)
- Eparchy of Kyiv (disambiguation)
- List of metropolitans and patriarchs of Kyiv (enumerating many title variations)
