= Archeparchy of Kyiv =

Archeparchy of Kyiv may refer to:

- Ukrainian Catholic Major Archeparchy of Kyiv-Halych, Major Archeparchy of the Ukrainian Greek Catholic Church
- Ukrainian Catholic Archeparchy of Kyiv, principal archdiocese (archeparchy) of the Ukrainian Catholic Major Archeparchy of Kyiv-Halych

== See also ==
- Eparchy of Kyiv (disambiguation)
- Patriarchate of Kyiv (disambiguation)
- Roman Catholic Diocese of Kyiv-Zhytomyr
- List of metropolitans and patriarchs of Kyiv (enumerating many title variations)
- Bishop of Kyiv (disambiguation)
