= Moses of Kyiv =

Moses of Kyiv may refer to:

- Moses of Kiev, a twelfth-century Jewish Talmudist
- Moses (Kulik) (born 1962), a patriarch of the Ukrainian Autocephalous Orthodox Church Canonical
