= Serafym Verzun =

Ukrainian Orthodox Archbishop

Serafym (Verzun)
- Archbishop of Kirovohrad and Holovanivsk
- Church: Ukrainian Orthodox Church of the Kyivan Patriarchate
- Installed: 2002
- Term ended: 2008
- Successor: Ivan Yaremenko (adm.)

Orders
- Ordination: 10 December 1978
- Consecration: 25 September 1992 by Metropolitan Filaret (Denysenko)

Personal details
- Born: Serhiy Dmytrovych Verzun; October 8, 1949 Kyiv, Ukrainian SSR
- Died: April 7, 2012 (aged 62) Bohuslav Raion, Ukraine

Serafym (secular name Serhiy Dmytrovych Verzun, Ukrainian: Сергій Дмитрович Верзун; October 8, 1949 - April 7, 2012) was the Ukrainian Orthodox archbishop of the Ukrainian Orthodox Church of the Kyivan Patriarchate.

He was born in 1949, studied at the Odessa Theological Seminary of the Russian Orthodox Church.

June 25, 1992 he joined to the Kyiv Patriarchate.

He was consecrated as Bishop of Vyshhorod, auxiliary of the Eparchy of Kyiv, by Filaret (Denysenko), Antoniy (Masendych), Andriy (Horak), Volodymyr (Romaniuk).
