= Bandyshivka =

Village in Mohilyv-Podilskyi Raion, Ukraine

Bandyshivka Бандишівка
- Village
- Location within Vinnytsia Oblast Location within Ukraine
- Coordinates: 48°24′11″N 28°00′10″E
- Country: Ukraine
- Oblast: Vinnytsia Oblast
- Raion: Mohyliv-Podilskyi Raion
- Hromada: Babchynets rural hromada
- Established: 1559
- Elevation: 197 m (646 ft)

Population
  - Total: 672
- Postal codes in Ukraine: 24054
- Area code: 380 4337

Bandyshivka (Ukrainian: Бандишівка; Polish: Bandyszówka) is a village in the Babchyntsi rural hromada, Mohyliv-Podilskyi Raion, Vinnytsia Oblast, Ukraine. It has a population of 672.

== Etymology ==
The name of the village most likely comes from "бандиш" (bandish), a Turkic word meaning "birthmarked man".

== History ==
According to written sources, the first mention of the village occurs in 1559.

Following the Second Partition of Poland, the village fell under control of the Russian Empire in 1793. By 1885, 730 people lived in the village in 201 households. There was an Orthodox church, postal office, and a lodge. It was located in the Babchynets volost, Yampil uyezd, Podilsk province.

In 1892, the village had 1,082 residents in 134 households. According to the 1897 All-Russia Census, there were 1,189 residents. 1,152 of them, (96.9%) were of Orthodox faith.

On 12 June 2020, on order 707-p of the Cabinet of Ministers of Ukraine "On the order of administrative centers and approval of territories of hromadas of Vinnytsia Oblast", it became a part of the Babchynets rural hromada. 1 month and 5 days later, following the administrative reform of Ukraine, it ceased to be a part of the Chernivtsi Raion and became part of the Mohyliv-Podilskyi Raion.

The village's church in modern times is the Church of the Protection of the Blessed Virgin Mary, part of the Tulchyn-Vinnytsia Diocese.
