= Moses (Kulik) =

Patriarch of UAOC-C (2005–2023)

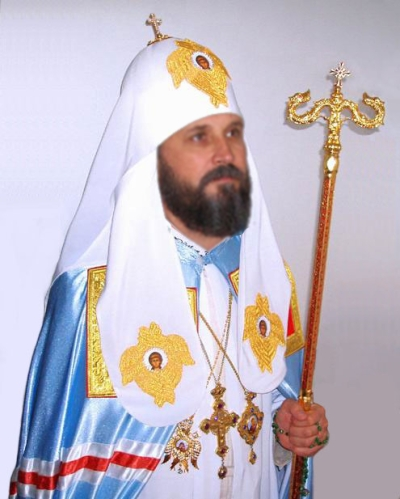
Patriarch Moses

Patriarch Moses was the Patriarch of the Ukrainian Autocephalous Orthodox Church Canonical, an autocephalous Orthodox church that declares its canonical origin from the Polish Orthodox Church and a 1920s era tomos issued by the Ecumenical Patriarch of that era.

Moses was born May 3, 1962, and given a secular birth name of Oleh Kulyk. On June 17–19, 2005 he was officially elevated to the rank of Patriarch of Kyiv and all of Rus' Ukraine by his Church.

== History ==
In 1978–82, he studied in the Khmelnytskyi Musical School and received diplomas as a teacher of music, a flautist and a conductor of brass bands and symphonic orchestras and performed as a flautist in symphonic orchestras and brass bands for four years.

In 1984–88, he studied in Khmelnytskyi Technological Institute of public services at the Engineering-Economical Faculty, from which he graduated with a degree in accounting and economic analysis.

== Ecclesiastical ministration ==
The ecclesiastical ministration started in 1989 - conducted the Episcopal professional chorus of the Nativity of Theotokos Cathedral in Khmelnytskyi.

=== Deacon ===
In May 1990, the Primate of UAOC Metropolitan Ioann (Bondarchuk) assigned Father Oleh Kulyk to metropolitan administrator to Khmelnytskyi, Vinnytsa and Zhytomyr regions.

=== Priest ===
By the blessing of the Holiest Patriarch Mstyslav, was ordained into the dignity of priest on November 25, 1990, in the Saint Michael the Archangel Cathedral.

From May 1990 till October 1992, Father Oleg visited over 200 villages and cities of Khmelnytskyi, Vinnytsa and Zhytomyr regions with the mission to revive the Ukrainian Church. He organized and obtained the registration of about 195 UAOC communities.

In August 1992, Metropolitan Ioann Bondarchuk assigned archpriest Oleh Kulyk to the missionary ministration to the United States in the Ukrainian parishes of UAOC under the omophorion of Patriarch Mstyslav.

At the same time Father Oleh studied to be a chaplain, he worked with the seriously ill patients in the hospital, looked after paralyzed people, and was refurbishing a house of prayer to an orthodox church, with the help of his parishioners.

This was mentioned by journalist Vitaly Karpenko: "On the same day [at the end of 1998], in the evening, His Holiness [Filaret (Denysenko)], the primate and Patriarch of the Ukrainian Orthodox Church – Kyiv Patriarchate, at the invitation of archpriest Oleg Kulik, visited the Church of the Holy Spirit (Detroit). This parish consists of newly arrived emigrants, and archpriest Oleg Kulik is engaged in missionary work. When meeting with His Holiness the patriarch, his parish expressed its desire to be part of the Kiev Patriarchate."

In 1999, after having left the Ukrainian parish, Father Oleh opened his own church in Warren, Michigan, giving it the name of the Russian Ukrainian Orthodox Church. This was mentioned by journalist Vitaly Karpenko: "On the same day, in the evening, His Holiness, at the invitation of archpriest Oleg Kulik, visited the Church of the Holy Spirit (Detroit). This parish consists of newly arrived emigrants, and archpriest Oleg Kulik is engaged in missionary work. When meeting with His Holiness the patriarch, his parish expressed its desire to be part of the Kiev Patriarchate."

While serving a small community of immigrants from the former Soviet Union, Father Oleh studied by correspondence at the department of Kyiv Theological Academy, of the Kiev Patriarchate, and worked full-time for Minoru Yamasaki Associates as a clerk in the archive department.

In 2002, he traveled to Ukraine and founded a community in Uzhhorod and obtained the registration of 12 more in the Transcarpathian region. He was preaching in schools, kindergartens, and different organizations, teaching people the understanding of the law of God in simple terms and with practical application to life. Registration of churches in Ukraine imparts government approval on the ministry.

=== Metropolitan ===
Upon return to the United States, following the rejection of the Ukrainian Patriarch to appoint him Bishop, Father Oleh received the proposal from his newly created church, the Holy Synod of UAOC Sobornopravna of North and South America to be ordained into Bishop and assigned to Ukraine from UAOC-Sobornopravna.

Father Oleh based this proposal of his own elevation on the promotion in 1990 the revival of UAOC in Ukraine during the post Soviet period and work in strong partnership with the deceased Patriarch Mstyslav Skrypnyk and Metropolitan Ioann Bondarchuk of the Ukrainian Autocephalous Orthodox Church and also having the experience of creation and development of the ecclesiastical structure.

In October 2002, although continuing to live and service his small religious community in Sterling Heights, Michigan, Father Oleh's Hierarchs Council of UAOC Sobornopravna of North and South America was held, where were issued to ordain the clergyman Koulik O.I. into Bishop and assign in the dignity of Metropolitan of Kyiv and All the Rus-Ukraine to Ukraine for the establishment of the Archdiocese of Kyiv and All the Rus-Ukraine.

On October 10, 2002, consecration and elevation to the rank of Metropolitan of Kyiv and All Rus-Ukraine of Bishop Moses (Kulyk) took place in the Boris and Gleb Cathedral in Cleveland.

Metropolitan Moses is assigned to Ukraine for the reestablishment of the Kyiv Metropolitanate and the revival of UAOC-Sobornopravna in Ukraine, a church not recognized by any of the established orthodox churches, with the right to the full administrative management and spiritual care».

On November 1, 2002, was held the press-conference of Metropolitan Stephan (Babiy-Petrovich), the Primate of UAOC-Sobornopravna of North and South America, dedicated to the historical Council of UAOC-Sobornopravna hierarchs and its decision as for return of Church from Diaspora to the territory of Ukraine.

In October 2002, he returned to Ukraine for the archpastoral ministration, to revive the canonical lineage of the Episcopal ordination from Saint Apostle Peter and revive the canonical branch of the Ukrainian Autocephalous Orthodox church from the Polish Orthodox Church, that still in 1924 received Tomos of autocephality, granted by the Ecumenical Patriarch Gregorios VII, on the canonical basis of the historical inhering to the Kyivan Rus Metropolitanate.

However, in 2004 in UAOC-Sobornopravna in the USA took place the events that changed cardinally the status of Metropolitan Moses in Ukraine. Stephan, Metropolitan of UAOC-Sobornopravna withdrew from the Church administration by reason of illness. The church was headed by Mykhayil. In 2004 he received the proposal as to union from Metropolitan Mefodiy (Kudriakov), the head of UAOC in Kyiv. Metropolitan Mykhayil agreed, and hurriedly excluded Metropolitan Moses from the list of the Hierarchs of UAOC-Sobornopravna.

As the result of union, UAOC-Sobornopravna in the USA passed under the omophorion of Metropolitan of UAOC in Ukraine, Mefodiy (Kudriakov).

Metropolitan Moses realizes the active work calling upon the unification of the scattered all over the world shatters of UOC because of the historical reasons.

Since that time and until the present day, Vladyka Moses has been actively engaging in the educating and missionary activity, has been preaching the lecture course "THE SECRETS OF THE HAPPY LIFE WITH GOD", which has already been listened by thousands of people. Due to the knowledge received at these lectures the true Christian - saving world-view is formed and almost each of the lecture listener witnesses the positive changes in their lives and in the life of their families.

=== Patriarch ===
On 17–18 June 2005, on Trinity Sunday by the decision of Holy Synod and by the decision of the Ecumenical Episcopal Council of UAOC canonical, Metropolitan Moses was chosen and enthroned to Patriarch of Kyiv and All Rus-Ukraine. The enthronement took place in the Orthodox sanctuary of the Ukrainian people, in the main Cathedral of Ukraine - in the Saint Sophia Cathedral in Kyiv. This is the same cathedral used by other aspirants to the title of Ukrainian Orthodox Patriarch for their ordinations, and was used by Metropolitan Epiphany for his incardination as Metropolitan of Kyiv under the omophorion of the Patriarch of Constantinople in early 2019. All clergy from the former autocephalous Ukrainian Orthodox Churches have been restored to regular, canonical status, i.e. they are all in communion with Constantinople as a matter of Church law.
