= Eastern Orthodoxy in Ecuador =

Eastern Orthodoxy in Ecuador refers to adherents, communities and organizations of Eastern Orthodox Christianity in Ecuador, canonical or not. Although the dominant religion in Ecuador is historically Roman Catholicism, in recent decades, other Christian denominations have gained adherents there, specially from Pentecostal protestant denominations.

Currently, there are two canonical Eastern Orthodox communities in Ecuador, the Serbian and Russian. Besides that, there are also two Old Calendarist, non-canonical, Orthodox communities operating in the country that belongs to Ukraine and Greece.

Although there are no exact figures for the number of Orthodox faithful in the country, according to a report by the newspaper El Universo in 2017, it is estimated that there are at least more than 400 parishioners in Guayaquil, mostly descendants of Palestinians, in addition to people converted to Orthodoxy. However, the activities of the Orthodox Church in Ecuador are few due to the growth of evangelical denominations, the entrenchment of the Roman Catholic faithful, in addition to the attempts of various jurisdictions of the Roman Catholic Church in the country to warn their parishioners of the activities of other denominations called catholic, as it has happened within the Old Catholic Church and the Episcopal Church.

== Serbian ==
Eastern Orthodox Christianity arrived in Ecuador through the immigration of people from Syria, Palestine, and Lebanon. Many of those immigrants were Maronite Catholics, faithful to Rome who later switched to the Latin Rite after assimilation and after failed attempts to establish a Maronite Rite church. During the 1960s, a group of people from Guayaquil, descendants of Palestinians, began to organize to form an Orthodox community called Fundación Cultural Católica Apostólica Ortodoxa Santa María, whose goal was to form an Orthodox church in Guayaquil.

On December 12, 1981, the first Orthodox church in Ecuador was created under the Antiochian Patriarchate. In 2012, the church became part of the Serbian Patriarchate. Currently, the parish called "Anunciación de Santa María" is located in Central Urdesa, in Guayaquil, under the command of archimandrite Rafael Chepernich. In addition, the parish has a site where an Orthodox church has begun to be built. As of August 2020, that construction has been stopped.

== Russian ==
Since 2007, there has been an Orthodox church that belongs to the Russian Patriarchate, it is under the command of archpriest Alexei Karpov. However, the church is ethnic since its divine liturgies are mostly performed in Russian. In 2009, during his meeting with the patriarch of the Russian Orthodox Church Kirill, Rafael Correa, former president of Ecuador, showed the church's intentions to build a church in Quito.

== Romanian ==
Since April 2023, Vicar Father Daniel Ene has carried out missionary activities in the city of Quito with the Romanian community in Ecuador. In the following months, members of the Jordanian, Lebanese, and Ecuadorian Orthodox communities also joined the parish.

The parish was established under the name Saint Hierarch Joseph the New of Partoș. Joseph the New of Partoș served as Metropolitan of Timișoara in 1650. He was born around 1568 in the city of Ragusa, in Dalmatia, into a family of Vlach Christians. He was canonized by the Romanian Orthodox Church on 7 October 1956, and his feast day is commemorated on 15 September.

Between 22 and 27 February 2025, Vicar Father Daniel Ene visited Quito with the blessing of His Eminence Archbishop and Metropolitan Nicolae and held meetings with representatives of the Ecuadorian government responsible for religious affairs.

During this period, the Romanian Orthodox Church in Ecuador obtained legal personality and was officially registered by Ecuadorian authorities.

In October 2025, the Orthodox faithful in Ecuador received a visit from His Eminence Nicolae, Romanian Archbishop of the Two Americas.

== See also ==
- History of the Eastern Orthodox Church
- History of Eastern Christianity
- Serbian Orthodox Church in North and South America
