= Eparchy of Lviv and Sokal =

Eparchy of the Orthodox Church of Ukraine

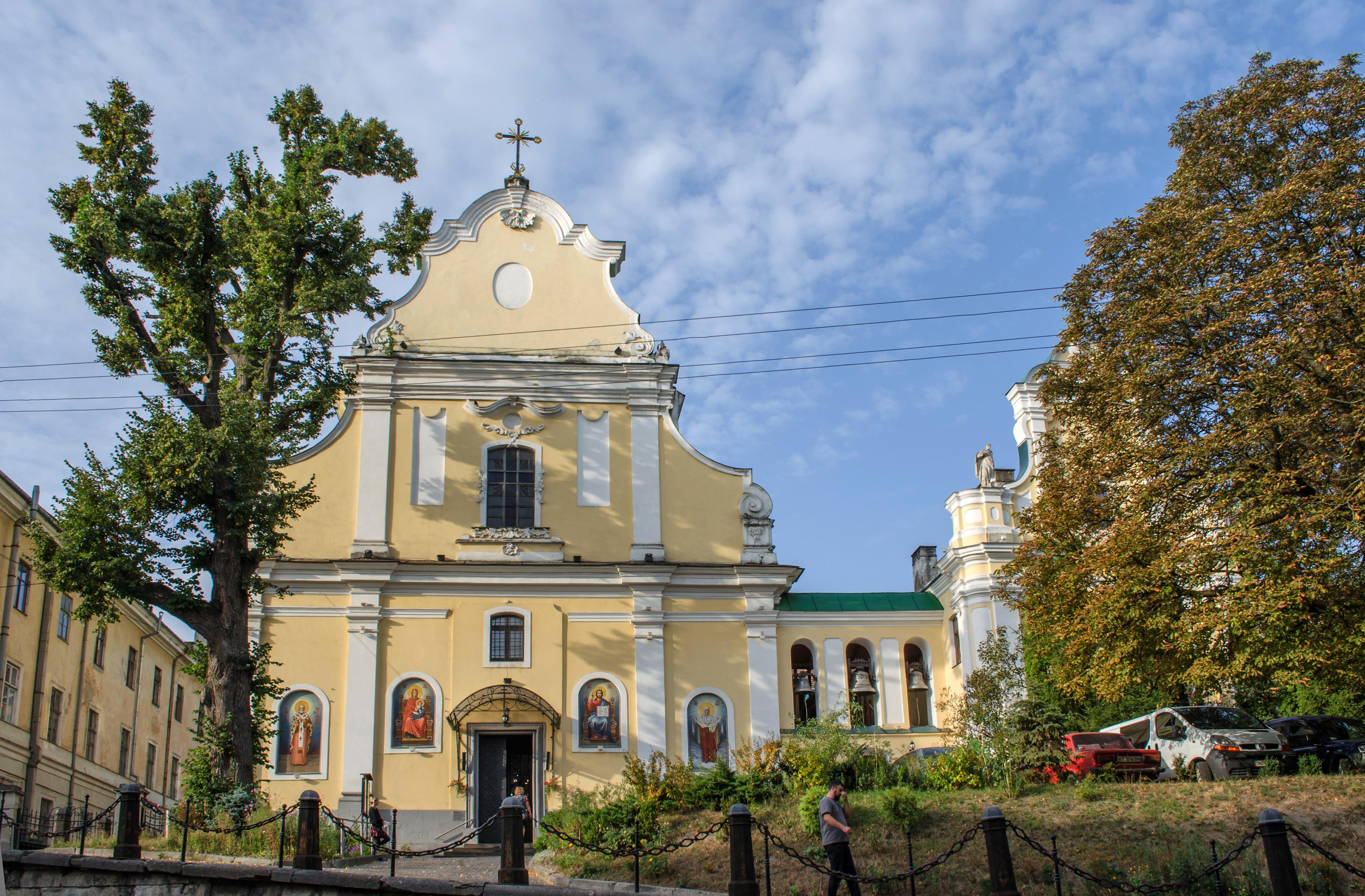
- Church of the Intercession of the Theotokos

Location
- Territory: Lviv Oblast (north)
- Headquarters: Lviv

Information
- Denomination: Eastern Orthodox
- Sui iuris church: Orthodox Church of Ukraine
- Language: Ukrainian

Current leadership
- Governance: Eparchy
- Bishop: Demetrius

Eparchy of Lviv and Sokal (Ukrainian: Львівсько-Сокальська єпархія, romanized: Lvivsko-Sokalska yeparkhiia) is an eparchy (diocese) of the Orthodox Church of Ukraine. The eparchy covers the northern portion of Lviv Oblast. It is one of three eparchies on the territory of Lviv Oblast.

The seat of the Eparchy is in the Church of the Intercession of the Theotokos in Lviv.

== History ==
The eparchy was established after World War II in 1945 in Lviv. It was established within the Moscow Patriarchate as part of its Ukrainian Exarchate as the Eparchy of Lviv and Ternopil. Originally, the eparchy covered four regions located in western Ukraine, specifically the oblasts of Lviv, Drohobych, Stanislav, and Ternopil. In 1946, a separate eparchy was established in Stanislav, later Ivano-Frankivsk. In 1954, the Lviv and Drohobych regions were merged into Lviv Oblast in its modern administrative borders. In 1988, a separate eparchy was established in Ternopil. In August of 1990, the eparchy changed its eparchial cathedral to the Church of the Intercession of the Theotokos, after handing over the St. George's Cathedral to the recently revived Ukrainian Greek Catholic Church.

In 1990, three bishops from the western Ukrainian eparchies, Andriy of Lviv, Feodosius of Ternopil, and Lazarus of Ivano-Frankivsk, petitioned Metropolitan Filaret of Kyiv to ask for an autocephalous status for the Ukrainian Church from the Moscow Patriarchate.

In the spring of 1992, several bishops of the Ukrainian Church held a meeting where they deposed their metropolitan bishop, splitting the church with most of the bishops siding with the Moscow Patriarchate, while others, who were more loyal to Metropolitan Filaret of Kyiv, in the summer of 1992 united with bishops of the Ukrainian Autocephalous Orthodox Church into the Ukrainian Orthodox Church of Kyivan Patriarchate. Andriy of Lviv was one of the Filaret loyalists.

== Diocesan bishops ==
- 1990—1993 — Andriy Horak, Bishop of Lviv and Drohobych
- 1993 — Volodymyr Romaniuk, Metropolitan of Lviv and Sokal (earlier as archbishop)
- 1993—2010 — Andriy Horak, Metropolitan of Lviv and Sokal (until 1995 as archbishop of Lviv)
- 2010—present — Demetrios Rudyuk, Metropolitan of Lviv and Sokal
