= Spyrydon Babskyi =

Archbishop of the Ukrainian Orthodox Church from 1992 to 1994

- Archbishop of Lutsk and Volyn
- Church: Ukrainian Orthodox Church of the Kyivan Patriarchate

Orders
- Ordination: 19 April 1981
- Consecration: 7 June 1992 by Metropolitan Filaret (Denysenko)

Personal details
- Born: Oleh Mykhaylovych Babskyi; May 13, 1958 Zhytomyr, Ukrainian SSR
- Died: May 1, 2011 (aged 52) Zhytomyr, Ukraine

Spyrydon (secular name Oleh Mykhaylovych Babskyi; 13 May 1958 – 1 May 2011) was the Ukrainian Orthodox archbishop of the Ukrainian Orthodox Church of the Kyivan Patriarchate (1992–1994).

Oleh Babskyi was born on May 13, 1958, in Zhytomyr city, now in Ukraine. During 1977-1981 he attended the Theological Seminary in Leningrad (now is Sankt-Petersburg), ROC and, after his marriage in March 1981, was ordained as a deacon by Archbishop of Tikhvin, Meliton Solovyov. On April 19, 1981, he was ordained a priest by Archbishop of Smolensk and Vyazma, Feodosiy Protsyuk. He served as a parish priest in ROC and graduated in absentia from the Theological Academy in Moscow (1985–1989) with a Th.D. degree.

In 1989 he was elevated to the dignity of archpriest. He was divorced from his wife, and supported Metropolitan Filaret (Denysenko) in split from the ROC and the creation of the Ukrainian Orthodox Church of the Kyivan Patriarchate. On 6 June 1992, he tonsured as a monk with name Spyrydon and next day, 7 June 1992, he was consecrated as first bishop of the UOC KP as titular Bishop of Pereyaslav-Khmelnytskyi, auxiliary of the Kyiv Eparchy. Consecration was in St Volodymyr's Cathedral in Kyiv by Metr. of Kyiv and all Ukraine Filaret Denysenko and Bishop of Pochayiv Yakiv Panchuk. On 25 July 1992, he was appointed as Bishop of Lutsk and Volyn and in December 1992 was elevated to the dignity of Archbishop and later, on 12 January 1993 appointed Archbishop of Dnipropetrovsk and Zaporizzhya. In 1993 he was appointed as Archbishop of Vinnytsia and Bratslav. On 25 December 1993 he left the UOC KP and again joined the ROC. He was accepted only as Archpriest Oleh Babskyi and in 1994 tonsured again as monk, but with name Vasyliy.

In 1997 he converted to the Catholic Church and incardinated to Kyiv-Vyshhorod Exarchate of the UGCC and was appointed parish priest in one among the parishes in Lutsk city. On 10 October 2004, he left the Church and joined to the Ukrainian Autocephalous Orthodox Church Canonical as Archbishop of Lutsk and Volyn Vasyliy. On 5 August 2005, he was joined to the Ukrainian Orthodox Church in America (not confuse this organization with Ukrainian Orthodox Church of the USA) as archbishop of Lutsk and Volyn, and changed again his name to Spyrydon (in June 2006). On 28 January 2008, he joined to the True Russian Orthodox Church (some marginal organization) as Archbishop of Lutsk and Volyn, but on 29 May 2009, he retired for health reasons. But in emeriture he had communicatio in sacris with the True Orthodox Church-Archepiscopacy of Slobodzhansk (other organization, that split from the True Russian Orthodox Church). He died in Zhytomyr on 1 May 2011.
