= Yuriy Yurchyk =

Ukrainian Anglican clergyman, former Orthodox bishop (born 1970)

Yuriy Yurchyovych Yurchyk (born on 1 May 1970 in Kamianets-Podilskyi) is a Ukrainian Anglican clergyman, who formerly was a bishop (since 1999) and archbishop (since 2005) of the UOC-KP of Donetsk and Mariupol. On November 24, 2008, he was banned from the clergy and excluded from the jurisdiction of the Kyiv Patriarchate after a conflict with Patriarch Filaret (Denysenko). He later joined the Ukrainian Greek Catholic Church together with the community of the Transfiguration Cathedral in Donetsk and five other priests and three parishes of the Donetsk Eparchy of the UOC-KP. Today, Yurchyk is associated with the Church of England's Diocese in Europe.

== Biography ==
=== Early years ===
Yurchyk was born on May 1, 1970, in the city of Kamianets-Podilskyi, Khmelnytsky region. He received his secondary education in Donetsk.

=== As Orthodox priest and bishop ===
From 1988 to 1990 he was a palamar and subdeacon in St. Nicholas Cathedral in Donetsk. Since 1990 Yurchyk has been a psalmist of the Church of the Exaltation of the Holy Cross in the town of Hirnyk, Donetsk Region.

On January 26, 1991, he was ordained a deacon by Bishop Joannicius (Kobzev) of Donetsk and Luhansk in St. Peter and Paul Cathedral in Luhansk, and on January 27 of the same year Yurchyk was ordained a priest. From 1991 to 1993 he served as a pastoral minister in the parishes of the Donetsk diocese. In 1992 Yurchyk left the Russian Orthodox Church and in 1993 graduated from the Kyiv Theological Seminary. In September 1993 he was appointed rector of the Savior-Transfiguration Parish of Donetsk and charitable of the first Donetsk district. From 1994 to 1996 he was secretary of the Donetsk-Luhansk diocesan administration.

In September 1996 he was ordained a monk named Yuri in honor of the great martyr George. On December 4, 1996, Yurchyk was elevated to the rank of Archimandrite.

On May 14, 1999, Yurchyk was ordained bishop of Donetsk and Luhansk by the Divine Liturgy in the Volodymyr Cathedral of Kyiv and appointed head of the Donetsk-Luhansk diocese. On December 20, 1999, he was appointed bishop of Donetsk and Mariupol, head of the Donetsk diocese and temporarily appointed head of the Luhansk diocese.

He was awarded the Order of the Holy Apostolic Prince Vladimir the Great III degree (January 23, 2004). On October 22, 2005, Yurchyk was elevated to the rank of archbishop.

After the conflict with Patriarch Philaret (Denisenko), on November 24, 2008, at a meeting of the Holy Synod of the Ukrainian Orthodox Church of the Kyiv Patriarchate, Archbishop Yuriy (Yurchyk) of Donetsk and Mariupol was banned from the clergy and removed from the jurisdiction of the 4th Patriarch of Kyiv.

=== Conversion to Eastern Catholicism ===
In 2009 Yuriy Yurchyk transferred to the UGCC, where he was accepted as a simple priest of the Ukrainian Catholic Archiepiscopal Exarchate of Donetsk. in the Donetsk parish of the Transfiguration. Since then, he has not served as bishop. In addition to serving as a parish priest in the Transfiguration parish, he was also the superior general of the diocesan Priestly Fraternity of St. Clement of Rome in Donetsk. In 2014, he left Donetsk engulfed in fighting and moved to Zaporizhia, where he became a resident at the co-cathedral Roman Catholic parish of God the Merciful Father.

From 2014 to 2017 he was on the Greek Catholic mission in the United Arab Emirates, when he founded a Greek Catholic parish in Dubai, Yemen and Oman. He resided in Dubai, where, as a biritualist priest, he was in charge of the Ukrainian diaspora, as well as the Polish and Slovak diaspora. After returning to Ukraine, he became the administrator of the Greek Catholic parish and the director of Caritas in Severodonetsk.

=== Conversion to Anglicanism ===
In 2025, Yuriy Yurchyk converted to Anglicanism. He became a cleric of the Diocese in Europe of the Church of England. He serves as a vicar in the Anglican Church in Poland. He carries out his ministry in Poland and Ukraine.
