= Eparchy of Lviv =

Eparchy of the Orthodox Church of Ukraine

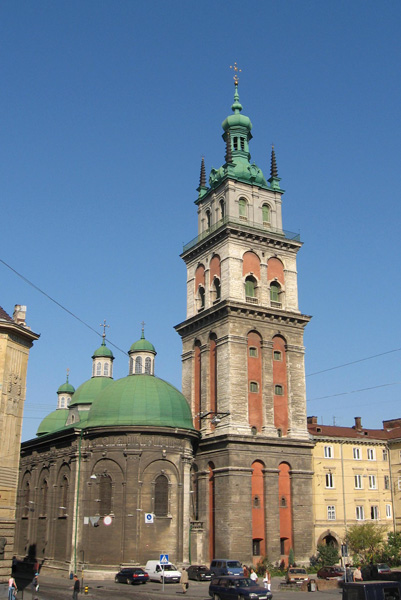
- Dormition Church and Korniakt Tower

Location
- Territory: Lviv Oblast
- Headquarters: Lviv

Information
- Denomination: Eastern Orthodox
- Sui iuris church: Orthodox Church of Ukraine
- Established: 1989
- Language: Ukrainian

Current leadership
- Governance: Eparchy
- Bishop: Macarius of Lviv

Eparchy of Lviv (Ukrainian: Львівська єпархія, romanized: Lvivska yeparkhiia) is an eparchy (diocese) of the Orthodox Church of Ukraine. The eparchy covers territory of Lviv Oblast.

The seat of Eparchy is in the Dormition Church in Lviv.

== History ==
The Eparchy of Lviv was founded in 1989 after the restoration of the Ukrainian Autocephalous Orthodox Church. Until 2018, it was the administration office of the afformentioned church.

The Dormition Church performs the functions of the cathedral. The current bishop is the Metropolitan of Lviv Macarius of Lviv.

== Diocesan bishops ==
- 1990—1992 — Ioann Bodnarchuk, Metropolitan of Lviv and Galicia-Volhynia
- 1992—1996 — Peter Petrus, Metropolitan of Lviv
- 1996— Macarius of Lviv, Metropolitan of Lviv, Metropolitan of Kyiv and all Ukraine (2015—2018)
