= Mykhayil Javchak Champion =

Metropolitan Mykhayil (Javchak-Champion)

Metropolitan Mykhayil Javchak Champion (Michael Javchak Champion) is the Metropolitan Bishop of New York City and America for the Ukrainian Autocephalous Orthodox Church.

Coat of Arms of Metropolitan Mykhayil and the UAOC in North & South America

== Early life and education ==
Champion is a native of Peekskill, New York, and spent 20 years of ministry in the Cleveland, Ohio area. He graduated from Duquesne University in Pittsburgh, Pennsylvania, and received a Master of Arts Degree in Theology from Saint Mary Seminary and Graduate School of Theology of the Cleveland Diocese in 1993.

== Clerical career ==
During his seminary years, Javchak-Champion worked as a cantor and pastoral associate in various Eastern Orthodox and Greek Catholic parishes in the Cleveland Area. From 1986-1989 he also worked in the chancery office of the Eparchy of Parma, as director of the eparchial cantor's programs, editor of The Cantor's Voice, a publication for music ministers. Additionally, he was editorial assistant and cantor to Bishop Andrew Pataki. Among other things, the future Metropolitan was key in producing the bishop's ad limina report, multiple liturgical publications among other efforts.

Ordained to the priesthood in 1997, he became a bishop of Cleveland in the Ukrainian Autocephalous Orthodox Church in 1999. He was pastor of the UAOC Cathedral Church of SS Boris and Hlib during that era.

On May 2, 2001, Metropolitan Javchak Champion offered the opening prayer at the United States House of Representatives, at the invitation of then Congressman John E. Sununu of New Hampshire.

On January 29, 2001, President George W Bush established the Office of Faith Based and Community Initiatives. Archbishop Javchak Champion was appointed a member. He met the President during his encounter with faith-based and community groups in Cleveland's Tremont neighborhood and in April, 2001 the Archbishop had a conference with the director of the Office of Faith-Based Action, John DiIulio, PhD, at the White House, in the Eisenhower Office Building.

Later that same year, in the aftermath of the terrorist attracts on the United States of September 11, 2001, Metropolitan Mykhayil Javchak-Champion volunteered his services as a first-responder chaplain to Ground 0 at the World Trade Center site in New York City for several weeks following the event. There, he performed pastoral ministry, including “last rites” and blessing of the remains of those bodies recovered, including a number of firefighters, at the makeshift morgue located onsite as well as directly on “the pile”. He also served in the administration of the sacraments of confession and communion to Orthodox Christians who were working there, engaged in pastoral counseling and simply offering friendship and a kind word to firefighters, police, EMT, construction and other workers and volunteers. Together with two other clergy of the UAOC, he is considered among the only Eastern Orthodox volunteer chaplains who performed pastoral ministry at Ground O, and represented the Orthodox faith at a time when people of all backgrounds looked to God for solace, peace and answers.

Following his return to Cleveland at the conclusion of his ministry at Ground 0, the Metropolitan visited several parishes and spoke of his experience at Ground 0. Some were covered in the local press, particularly his visit to Saint Mary of the Protection Ukrainian Orthodox Church then located in Plymouth, IN, which was converted by the South Bend Tribune. Over the years, Metropolitan Mykhayil has participated in area commemorations of September 11, and has spoken of his time of service there. He was recognized as a bonafide 9/11 volunteer responder by the United States government.

In December 2002 Javchak-Champion supported the ideology of UAOC-Sobornopravna.

Javchak-Champion took on the leadership of the Ukrainian Autocephalous Orthodox Church in the Americas (UAOC-Sobornopravna) in 2004, after the retirement of Metropolitan Stephan (Babiy-Petrovich). At the April 2004 convocation of the regular Metropolitan synod, the Council of Hierarchs of the Ukrainian Autocephalous Orthodox Church of North & South America and the Diaspora officially accepted the resignation of Archbishop Petrovich, who voluntarily asked to retire for health reasons.

In 2004-2005 within the UAOC-Sobornopravna in the USA, events took place that changed its status. The UAOC of North and South America, headed by Javchak-Champion, joined with UAOC in Ukraine, and on April 21, 2004 declared Metropolitan Mefodiy (Kudriakov) to be their Primate.

Javchak-Champion, with the blessing of Metropolitan Mefodiy, returned to Northern Westchester in 2005, where he relocated the church's administrative office and founded the Holy Spirit Ukrainian Orthodox Parish. He cared for us father in his last year of life. In 2005, he supported Metropolitan Mefodiy (Kudriakov) in a conflict with Archbishop Ihor Isichenko.

In February 2006 Metropolitan Mefodiy (Kudryakov), Metropolitan of Kyiv and All Ukraine, worldwide primate of the Ukrainian Autocephalous Orthodox Church (UAOC) made a pastoral visit to the United States, at the invitation of Metropolitan Javchak-Champion. They concelebrated the Divine Liturgy together and visited church communities. Likewise in 2005, 2007 and 2008, Metropolitan Mykhayil made official visits to the Primate of the UAOC, Metropolitan Mefodiy (Kudriakov) in Kyiv.

In 2007 Javchak-Champion said that his church supported Cardinal Lubomyr Husar, Archbishop Ihor Vozniak and members of the Ukrainian Greek Catholic Church in their dispute with Latin Traditionalist Catholics in Ukraine.

Also in 2007, while on an official visit to the Primate of the UAOC, Metropolitan Mefodiy (Kudriakov), and Metropolitan Mykhayil visited Ternopil, and had interview with Ukrainian journalists

After the death of Metropolitan Mefodiy on February 24, 2015, Metropolitan Javchak-Champion sent official condolences and promulgated an official period of mourning for the death of the church's visible head. Due to developing and uncertain political/ecclesiastical developments in Ukraine, subsequent to the death of Metropolitan Mefodiy, the UAOC in the USA currently asserts autonomy, while recognizing the successor of Metropolitan Mefodiy, since 2018, His Beatitude Metropolitan Epiphanius, Primate of the Orthodox Church of Ukraine, to be the Worldwide Head of the Ukrainian Orthodoxy.

In 2007, Archbishop Javchak-Champion was the first Orthodox Christian hierarch to write a response to the document A Common Word Between Us and You, an historic outreach by Muslim leaders to the interfaith community. He was a participant in the Yale conference "Loving God and Neighbor in Word and Deed", a workshop on the same document. The event gathered religious scholars and activists from several countries and was co-sponsored by Prince Ghazi bin Muhammad of Jordan and the Yale University Center for Faith and Culture's Reconciliation Program.

The Archbishop has long been a proponent of liberation theology and took an early interest in the development of the Latin American church. He studied the Spanish language for eight years, at the high school and university levels. Champion speaks often as an advocate for the rights of immigrants and any persons who are marginalized or experience bias. He has been a co-chair of the Cortlandt Taskforce on Diversity. The church has also conducted a weekly breakfast program as a gesture of hospitality for local immigrant workers.

In 2011, New York became the sixth U.S. state to legalize same-sex marriages. At that time Archbishop Champion, as the president of the local Interfaith clergy association PAPA, was one of a number of local clergy interviewed about the development. He said that the freedom to marry is a civil right all Americans should have:

I certainly think it’s a matter of civil rights, and the more equality we have amongst people in this country the better,” Champion said. While the state has legalized gay marriage, Champion pointed out churches in the state are not required to recognize or perform them. “I do realize there are some faith leaders that may not agree with performing same-sex unions, however they are not obliged to do so.”

The ministry has led the Archbishop to travel to parishes in Ukraine, Ecuador, Canada and Colombia among other places. Javchak-Champion works extensively in inter-religious ministry, having served for four years (2009-2013) as president of the Peekskill Area Pastors Association (PAPA), the largest interfaith organization in northern Westchester County. From 2017-2019, Javchak-Champion again served as Vice President and then President of the organization.

Metropolitan Archbishop Javchak-Champion continues to minister to communities across the United States as well as in Latin America and Ukraine. He has received recognitions from government, civic and religious leaders and organizations nationwide and beyond.

On March 17, 2020, Archbishop-Metropolitan Michael (Yavchak-champion) registered at his own home address in village Buchanan (state New York) his new structure, excluded from the jurisdiction of Metropolitan Stephan (Babiy-Petrovich), with a similar name - "Archdiocese of the UAOC of North and South America in honor of St. Boris and Gleb incorporated".
