= Eparchy of Vinnytsia and Bar =

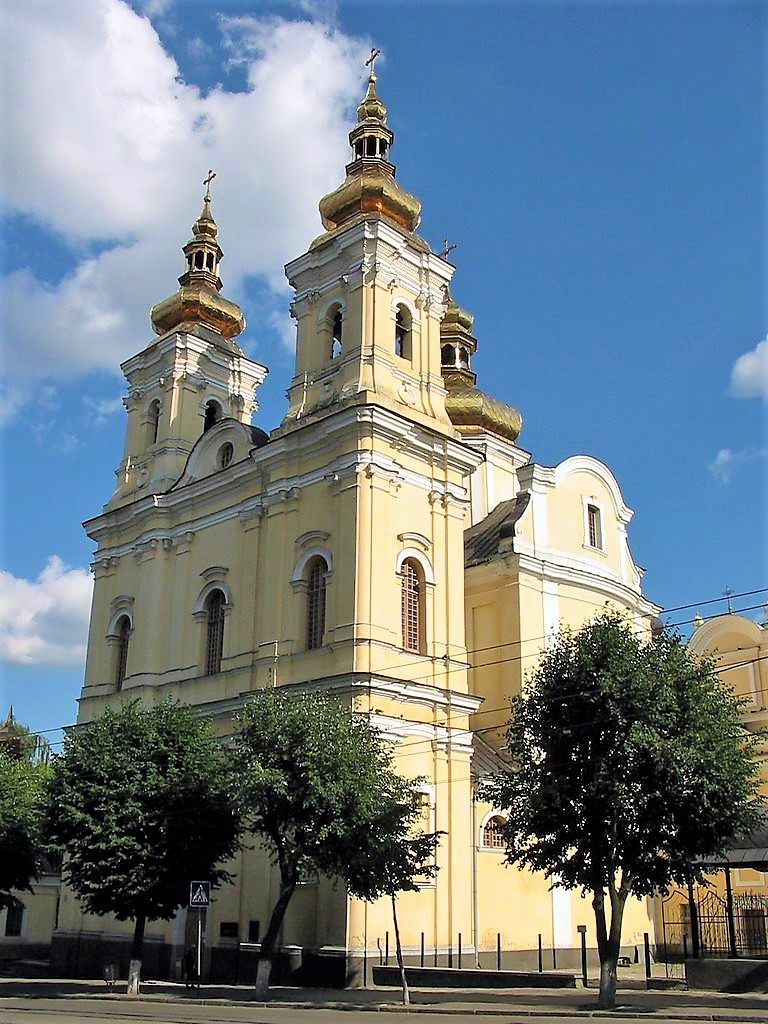
- Transfiguration Cathedral

Location
- Territory: portion of Vinnytsia Oblast
- Deaneries: 8
- Headquarters: Vinnytsia

Statistics
- Parishes: 108 (December 2022)

Information
- Denomination: Eastern Orthodox
- Sui iuris church: Orthodox Church of Ukraine
- Rite: Byzantine Rite
- Established: 25 August 1933 (as eparchy of Ukrainian Exarchate)
- Secular priests: 50 (December 2022)
- Language: Ukrainian, Church Slavonic

Current leadership
- Governance: Eparchy
- Metropolitan: Symeon (Shostatsky)

Eparchy of Vinnytsia and Bar (Ukrainian: Вінницько-Барська єпархія) is an eparchy (diocese) of the Orthodox Church of Ukraine centered in Vinnytsia and in Bar, Ukraine. It unites parishes of Vinnytsia Oblast that have moved from the UOC (MP).

The eparchy is subdivided into 8 deaneries. The seat of the Eparchy is in the Transfiguration Cathedral in Vinnytsia. Besides the main cathedral temple, there are a few other temples and monasteries with the status of a cathedral, such as the Lower church of the cathedral of the Holy Unmercenaries Cosmas and Damian, the Holy Ascension Men's Monastery, the Annunciation of the Blessed Virgin Mary Nunery, and the Skete of the Annunciation Nunery in honor of Saint Mary Magdalene, Equal to the Apostles. In addition, the eparchy has a separate parish located in Novovolynsk, Volyn Oblast.

== History ==
The Eparchy of Vinnytsia was founded on 25 August 1933 out of the Eparchy of Podolia within the Ukrainian Exarchate. In 1990 Ukrainian Exarchate of the Russian Orthodox Church was transformed into the Ukrainian Orthodox Church with local autonomous status.

In 2018 Episcope Symeon (Shostatsky) as one of few bishops of the Russian-owned Ukrainian Orthodox Church joined the united Orthodox Church of Ukraine (Unification Council). The administration of the Ukrainian Orthodox Church instead reestablished another diocese with the same name to demonstrate its protest of the decision.

The charter of the eparch administration was re-registered by the Ministry of Culture and Information Policy on 15 March 2019 as Eparchy of Vinnytsia and Bar.

According to the information provided in January 2021 by Metropolitan Simeon, out of about 320 parishes he headed before moving to the OCU of the Vinnytsia and Bar, Ukraine eparchy of the UOC (MP), 51 parishes, as well as some parishes of the neighboring eparchies of Tulchyn and Mohyliv-Podilskyi, moved to the Vinnytsia eparchy of the OCU.

As of December 2022, the eparchy has 1 monastery, 1 monastic skete, 108 parishes in all districts of Vinnytsia Oblast, and 50 priests. Most parishes and priests are joined from the UOC (MP).

== Diocesan bishops ==
- 2018—present — Symeon Shostatsky, Bishop of Vinnytsia and Bar
