= Transfiguration Cathedral, Vinnytsia =

Transfiguration Cathedral
- Спасо-Преображенський собор
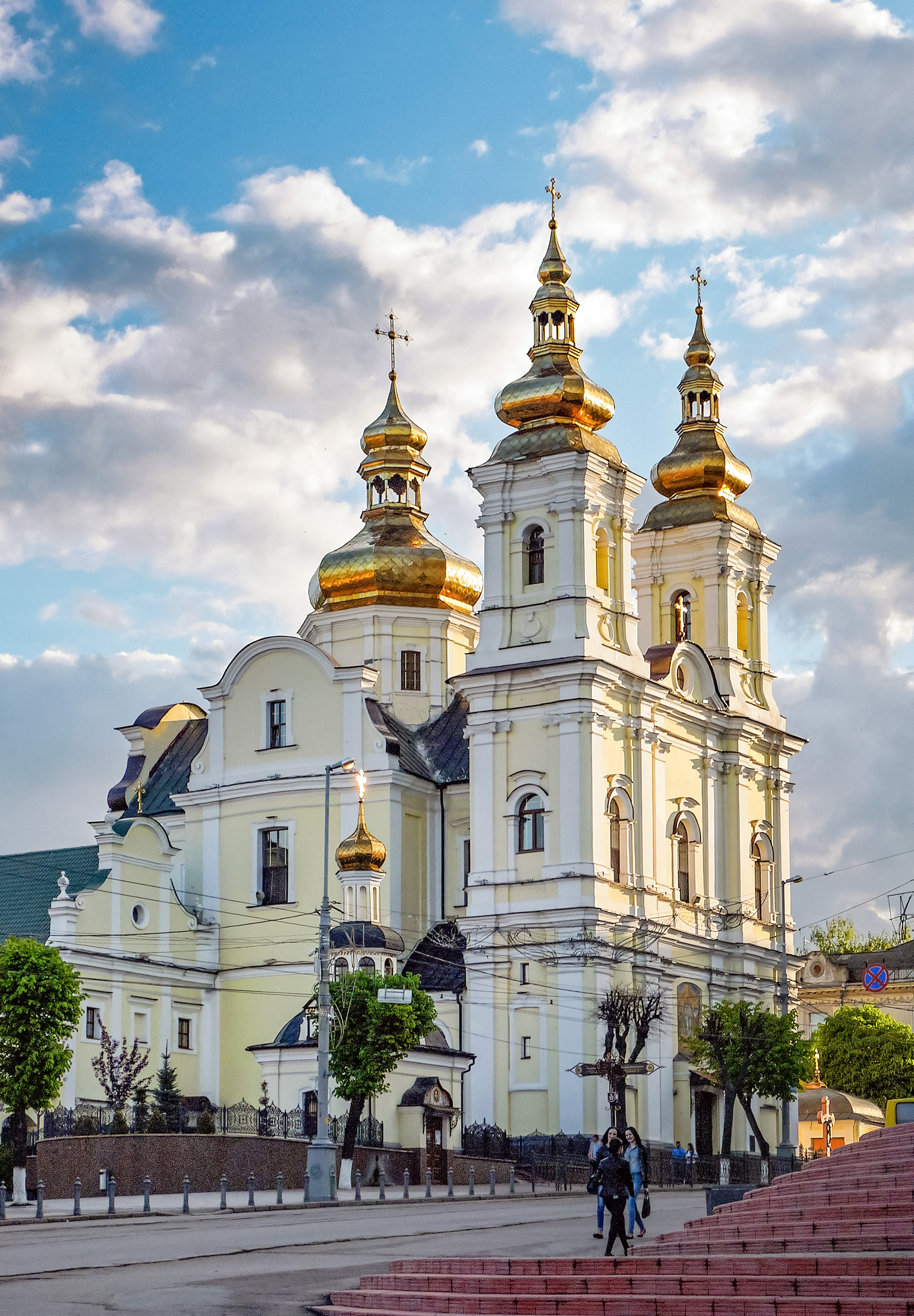
- Transfiguration Cathedral
- 49°13′59″N 28°28′31″E
- Location: Vinnytsia
- Country: Ukraine
- Denomination: Orthodox Church of Ukraine

Architecture
- Architect: Paolo Fontana
- Groundbreaking: 1758
- Completed: 1779

Immovable Monument of National Significance of Ukraine
- Official name: Костел домініканців Благовіщення Пресвятої Діви Марії
- Type: Architecture
- Reference no.: 020031/1

The Transfiguration Cathedral or Saviour-Transfiguration Cathedral (Ukrainian: Спасо-Преображенський собор) is an Eastern Orthodox church in Vinnytsia, under the jurisdiction of the Orthodox Church of Ukraine. It is located in a site of a former Dominican monastery.

== History ==
The Dominican monastery in Vinnytsia was founded in 1630, but several years later, during the Khmelnytsky Uprising, the monks left it and returned to the city only at the end of the century. In 1758, a stone church for the Dominicans was founded by Michał Grocholski. At the end of the 18th century, six monks were permanently residing in the monastery. The small size and poverty of the community became the official reason for its liquidation in 1832, during the dissolution of monasteries in the Russian partition. In the same year, the closed Dominican monastery was handed over to the Russian Orthodox Church. In 1833, the community church was re-ordained as the Transfiguration Cathedral - after the demolition of the old church of Saints Cosmas and Damian, it became the main center of Orthodox worship in the city. In 1855, in the burial crypt of the Grocholski family, which was located in the basement of the former church, the lower church of Saints Cosmas and Damian was established, moving the remains of the founders of the Dominican monastery to a separate room in the basement and bricking them up. In 1847 the Cathedral of the Transfiguration was visited by Nicholas I with his sons Alexander and Nicholas. After a year, the tsar signed the renovation project of the building, but work on its implementation was not started until 1860. The rebuilt building was consecrated on 27 November 1866 by the Orthodox Bishop of Podole, Leontius. In 1916, Tsar Nicholas II visited the cathedral.

During the Polish-Soviet War, the cathedral was visited by Symon Petliura in April 1920 and Józef Piłsudski on 16 May. In 1922, during the confiscation of church valuables, all the valuable equipment of the cathedral was confiscated by the Soviet authorities. In 1930 the building was taken from the Orthodox parish and turned into a warehouse. Then it was returned to the ROC, but in 1962 the state again took over the facility and turned it into a sports hall. In the 1980s, a concert hall was located in the former cathedral. It functioned until 1990, when the building was handed over by the municipal and regional authorities to the Ukrainian Orthodox Church. The organ used during the concerts in the building was dismantled and went to the Capuchin church of Our Lady of the Angels in Vinnytsia.

Until 16 December 2018, the eparchy of Vinnytsia of the UOC (MP) was located in the cathedral. On that day, the local parish was transferred to the jurisdiction of the newly formed Orthodox Church of Ukraine, as did Metropolitan Simeon, the bishop of the Eparchy of Vinnytsia and Bar.
