= Eparchy of Kyiv =

The term Eparchy of Kyiv may refer to:

- Eparchy of Kyiv (Orthodox Church of Ukraine), central (primatial) eparchy of the Orthodox Church of Ukraine
- Eparchy of Kyiv (Moscow Patriarchate), central (primatial) eparchy of the Ukrainian Orthodox Church (Moscow Patriarchate) under the supreme ecclesiastical jurisdiction of the Russian Orthodox Church
- Eparchy of Kyiv (Kyiv Patriarchate), central (primatial) eparchy of the former Ukrainian Orthodox Church (Kyiv Patriarchate)
- Eparchy of Kyiv (Ukrainian Autocephalous Orthodox Church), central eparchy of the former Ukrainian Autocephalous Orthodox Church
- Eparchy of Kyiv (Ukrainian Autocephalous Orthodox Church Canonical), central eparchy of the Ukrainian Autocephalous Orthodox Church Canonical
- Ukrainian Catholic Archeparchy of Kyiv, central eparchy of the Ukrainian Byzantine Catholic Church

== See also ==
- Kyiv
