= Filaret Denysenko =

Ukrainian Orthodox religious leader (1929–2026)

Hero of Ukraine His Holiness and Beatitude Filaret
- Archbishop and Metropolitan of Kyiv – Mother of the Rus Cities and of Galicia, Patriarch of All Rus-Ukraine, Holy Archimandrite of the Holy Assumption Kyiv-Pechersk and Pochaiv Lavras
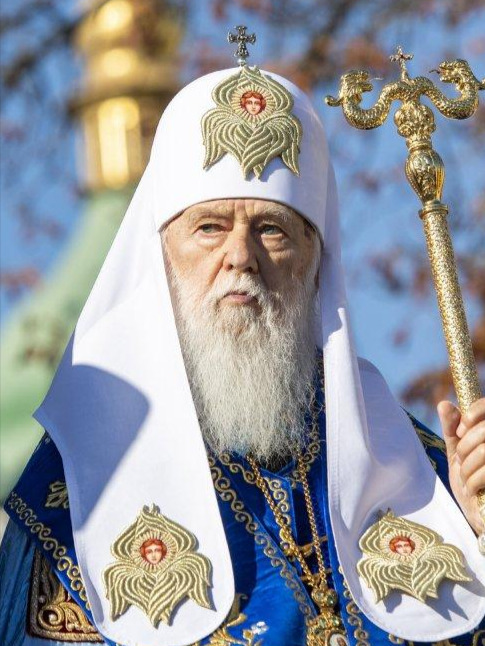
- Filaret in 2018
- Church: Kyiv Patriarchate
- See: Patriarch of Kyiv and all Ukraine
- Installed: July 1995
- Term ended: 15 December 2018
- Predecessor: Ioasaph II (ROC); Volodymyr (UOC-KP)
- Successor: Volodymyr II (UOC-MP); Epiphanius (OCU); himself as "Honorary Patriarch"
Previous posts
| Previous posts | Metropolitan of Kiev, Galicia, Exarch of Ukraine (1966–1990); Locum tenens of the Patriarchate of Moscow (1990); Metropolitan of Kyiv and all Ukraine (1990–1992) |

Orders
- Ordination: 18 June 1951
- Consecration: 4 February 1962 by Pimen I of Moscow

Personal details
- Born: Mykhailo Antonovych Denysenko; 23 January 1929 Blahodatne, Amvrosiivka Raion, Stalino Okrug, Ukrainian SSR, Soviet Union
- Died: 20 March 2026 (aged 97) Kyiv, Ukraine
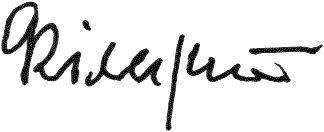
- Signature: Filaret's signature

Patriarch Filaret (secular name Mykhailo Antonovych Denysenko; (Note: In this name that follows East Slavic naming customs, the patronymic is Antonovych and the family name is Denysenko.) Ukrainian: Михайло Антонович Денисенко; 23 January 1929 – 20 March 2026) was a Ukrainian religious leader, serving as the primate and Patriarch of the Ukrainian Orthodox Church–Kyiv Patriarchate (UOC–KP). The Orthodox Church of Ukraine (OCU), which he left in 2019, viewed him as the Honorary Patriarch emeritus, while the Ecumenical Patriarchate of Constantinople recognized him as a former Metropolitan of Kyiv.

Denysenko was the Metropolitan of Kiev and the Exarch of Ukraine in the Patriarchate of Moscow (1966–1992). After joining the Kyiv Patriarchate, he was defrocked and in 1997 excommunicated by the Russian Orthodox Church (ROC). On 11 October 2018, the Patriarchate of Constantinople reinstated him in church communion. However, while restored to the episcopate, the Ecumenical Patriarchate never recognised him as Patriarch and views him as the former Metropolitan of Kyiv. On 15 December 2018, the Ukrainian Orthodox Church of the Kyiv Patriarchate united with the Ukrainian Autocephalous Orthodox Church and some members of the Ukrainian Orthodox Church–Moscow Patriarchate (UOC–MP) into the Orthodox Church of Ukraine; the Ukrainian Orthodox Church–Kyiv Patriarchate thus ceased to exist. On 20 June 2019, however, a conflict between Filaret and the new metropolitan of the OCU, Epiphanius of Kyiv, over details of the unification lead to Filaret declaring continuation of the UOC–KP with himself as the metropolitan. The continued UOC–KP is not currently recognized by any of the major Eastern Orthodox churches, nor the Government of Ukraine.

== Early years ==
Mykhailo Denysenko was born on 23 January 1929, into a worker's family in the village of Blahodatne in the Amvrosiivsky Raion (district), now in the Donetsk Oblast (province) in Eastern Ukraine. His parents were Anton and Melania Denysenko. As a teenager, Mykhailo was greatly affected by his father's death on the frontline in 1943, which contributed to his turn to religion. Starting from 1946, he obtained his theological education at the Odesa Seminary (Moscow Patriarchate) and the Moscow Theological Academy where he became a close associate of Patriarch Alexius I of Moscow. He took monastic vows in 1950 assuming the monastic name Filaret and was ordained hierodeacon in January 1950 and priest in June 1951. After his graduation he stayed at the Moscow Theological Academy as a professor (from 1952) and Senior Assistant to the Academy inspector, simultaneously serving as archpriest of Trinity Lavra of St. Sergius. In 1956, he was appointed Inspector of the Theological Seminary in Saratov and elevated to the rank of hegumen. In 1957, he was appointed Inspector of the Kyiv Theological Seminary. In July 1958, he was further elevated to the rank of Archimandrite and appointed seminary rector.

== Hierarch of the Russian Orthodox Church ==
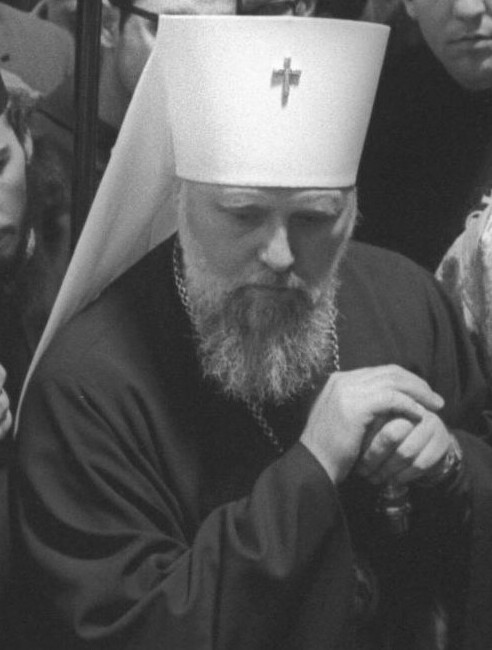
Filaret during his tenure as Metropolitan of Kyiv and Halych in 1972

In 1960, Filaret was appointed manager of the Ukrainian exarchate of the ROC and became prior of St Volodymyr's Cathedral in Kyiv. In 1961, Filaret served in the ROC mission to the Greek Orthodox Patriarchate of Alexandria. In January 1962, Filaret was elected vicar Bishop of the Leningrad Eparchy and, in February, was ordained bishop in Leningrad by Metropolitan Pimen (later Moscow Patriarch) and other bishops. Filaret was appointed to several diplomatic missions of the Russian Orthodox Church and from 1962 to 1964 served as ROC Bishop of Vienna and Austria. In 1964, he returned to Moscow as the Bishop of Dmitrov and rector of the Moscow Theological Academy and Seminary.

In 1966, he became archbishop of Kyiv and Halych. At that time he also became a permanent member of the Holy Synod, the highest collegiate body of the Russian Orthodox Church, which has the responsibility of electing the Moscow Patriarch. Two years later, Filaret became Metropolitan of Kyiv and Galicia, which was the second-highest position in the church hierarchy after the Patriarch.

As the new head of Ukrainian Exarchate, Filaret inherited a church, which had been severely damaged by Nikita Khrushchev's anti-religious campaign. In order to revive spiritual life in Ukrainian lands and restore the local church autonomy, he promoted the causes of religious education and publication of prayer books in Ukrainian language before his leadership in Moscow. As a result of Filaret's initiatives, the exarchate started publishing a magazine and religious books in Ukrainian. Ukrainian language was used by the metropolitan in his Christmas and Easter addresses, and priests also received education in Ukrainian. Filaret explained the necessity of Ukrainian-language religious publications with the need to reduce the risk of local faithful in Galicia and Transcarpathia being alienated from the Russian Orthodox Church and rejoining the Greek Catholics. As late as October 1989, Filaret was still saying, "The Uniates will never be legalized in our country."

On 3 May 1990, Patriarch Pimen of Moscow died and, the same day, Filaret became the locum tenens of the Russian Orthodox Church. Filaret lost the election to the post of Patriarch of Moscow receiving less votes than his competitors, Rostov and Novocherkassk metropolitan Volodymyr Sabodan and Leningrad and Novgorod metropolitan Alexey Ridiger, the eventual winner. Retrospectively, in 2019, Filaret declared "it was not by chance that I was not elected. The Lord prepared me for Ukraine".

In July 1990, Filaret was elected head of the newly established Ukrainian Orthodox Church (UOC) as part of ROC. On 27 October 1990, in a ceremony at St. Sophia Cathedral in Kyiv, the newly elected Patriarch Alexei II handed to Metropolitan Filaret a tomos granting "independence in self government" (the tomos did not use either of the words "autonomy" or "autocephaly"), and enthroned him, heretofore "Metropolitan of Kyiv", as "Metropolitan of Kyiv and All Ukraine". In November 1990, the first synod of UOC adopted its statute.

In 1992, the Russian Orthodox priest and Soviet dissident Fr. Gleb Yakunin accused Exarch Filaret of having been an informer for the KGB. Father Gleb stated that he had seen KGB files which listed Exarch Filaret's codename as Antonov. The fact of cooperation with KGB was mentioned by people's deputies of Ukraine on 20 January 1992 when they came out with an official statement. According to internal KGB documents, tasks the KGB assigned Filaret as an agent included promoting Soviet positions and candidates in the World Council of Churches (WCC), the Christian Peace Conference (CPC) and other international bodies, and, by the 1980s, backing the Soviet authorities' attempts to prevent the long-suppressed Ukrainian Catholic Church (disparagingly called 'Uniates') from regaining an open existence, and backing state attempts to prevent religious believers demanding their rights as glasnost and perestroika opened up the sphere of public debate. In 2018, Filaret declared in an interview with Radio Liberty that he, like all bishops under communism, had to have contacts with the KGB. In 2019, he declared every bishop of the Moscow Patriarchate had to have contact with the KGB, even when it came to appoint a bishop. He added that he had been trained by the Politburo and Patriarch Alexy by the KGB.

== Creation of the Ukrainian Orthodox Church – Kyiv Patriarchate ==
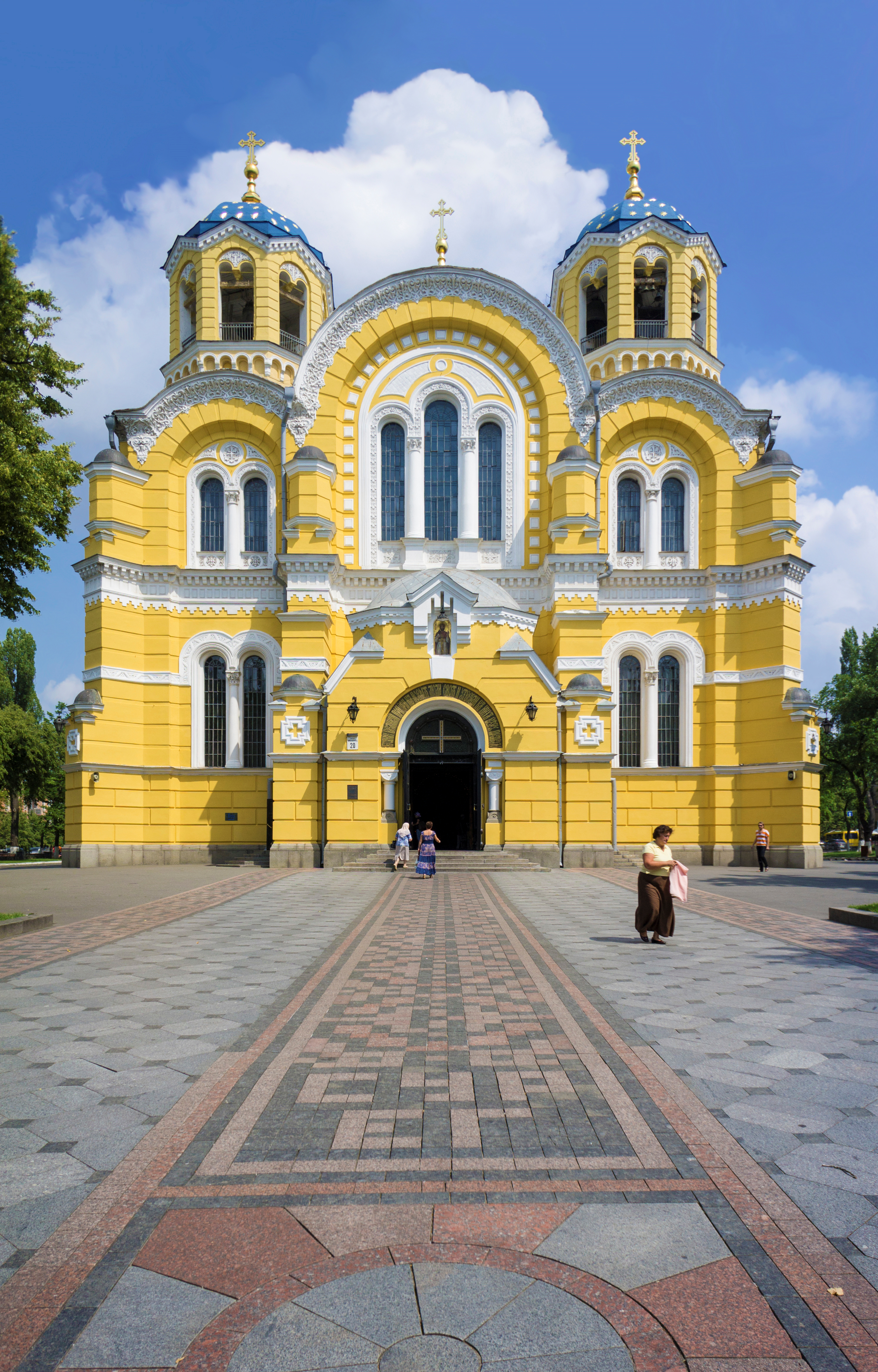
St. Volodymyr's Cathedral in Kyiv, which became the seat of UOC-KP after 1992

Following Ukraine's declaration of independence from the Soviet Union on 24 August 1991, a national sobor of the Ukrainian Orthodox Church was held from 1–3 November. At the sobor, the voting delegates, (who included all UOC bishops, clergy and lay delegates from each diocese; a delegate from each monastery and seminary, and recognized lay brotherhood) unanimously passed a resolution stating that henceforth the UOC would operate as an autocephalous church. A separate resolution expressed confidence in Filaret as the Primate of the UOC.

Filaret convened an assembly at the Kyiv Pechersk Lavra in January 1992 that adopted a request of autocephaly for Ukrainians to the Moscow Patriarch.

In March–April 1992, the Hierarchical Council of the Russian Orthodox Church met with a single agenda item: to consider the resolution passed by the UOC Sobor four months earlier. Although the issue itself was not discussed, Filaret was asked to resign. On the second day of the meeting, Metropolitan Filaret agreed to submit his resignation to the UOC Synod, and the ROC Synod passed a resolution which stated:

The Council of Bishops took into account the statement of the Most Reverend Filaret, Metropolitan of Kyiv and of All-Ukraine, that for the sake of church peace, at the next Council of Bishops of the Ukrainian Orthodox Church, he will submit a request to be relieved from the position of the Primate of the UOC. Understanding of the position of Metropolitan Filaret, the Council of Bishops expressed to him its gratitude for the long period of labour as Archbishop of the See of Kyiv and blessed him to carry out his episcopal service in another diocese of the Ukrainian Orthodox Church.

However, after returning to Kyiv, Filaret recanted his resignation. On 14 April, Metropolitan Filaret held a press conference in which he alleged that undue pressure was exerted at the ROC Synod in Moscow. Filaret stated that he was retracting his resignation on the grounds that he "would answer before God for the Ukrainian Orthodox Church."

== Suspension and anathemization ==
Shortly thereafter, the Russian Orthodox Church, unable to prevent the creation of what it, and all other orthodox churches within the global communion at the time, viewed as a "schismatic church" in independent Ukraine, helped to organize a rival synod which was held in Kharkiv in May 1992. These bishops elected a bishop of the Russian Orthodox Church, Bishop Volodymyr (Sabodan), Metropolitan of Kyiv, and received recognition from Moscow as the Ukrainian Orthodox Church (Moscow Patriarchate).

Filaret was suspended on 27 May 1992 by the Ukrainian Orthodox Church (Moscow Patriarchate). The bishops loyal to Metropolitan Filaret and a similar group from the Ukrainian Autocephalous Orthodox Church (another recently revived church in Ukraine) organized a unifying sobor which was held on 25 June 1992. The delegates agreed to form a combined church named the Ukrainian Orthodox Church - Kyiv Patriarchate (UOC-KP) under the patriarch they elected, Patriarch Mstyslav.

Filaret was defrocked by the Russian Orthodox Church on 11 July 1992. The UOC-KP was not recognized by other Orthodox churches and was considered schismatic.

Filaret was then anathemized by the Russian Orthodox Church in 1997. ROC officials stated that the anathematization of Filaret was "recognized by all the Local Orthodox Churches including the Church of Constantinople" The synod of the Ecumenical Patriarchate did indeed recognize, in a July 1992 letter to Patriarch Alexy II, the defrocking of Filaret by the ROC, and the Ecumenical Patriarch recognized the anathemization of Filaret in a letter of April 1997 to Patriarch Alexy II. Filaret was also accused by the ROC of having a wife and three children, but it was "never proved".

== Leadership of the Ukrainian Orthodox Church – Kyiv Patriarchate ==
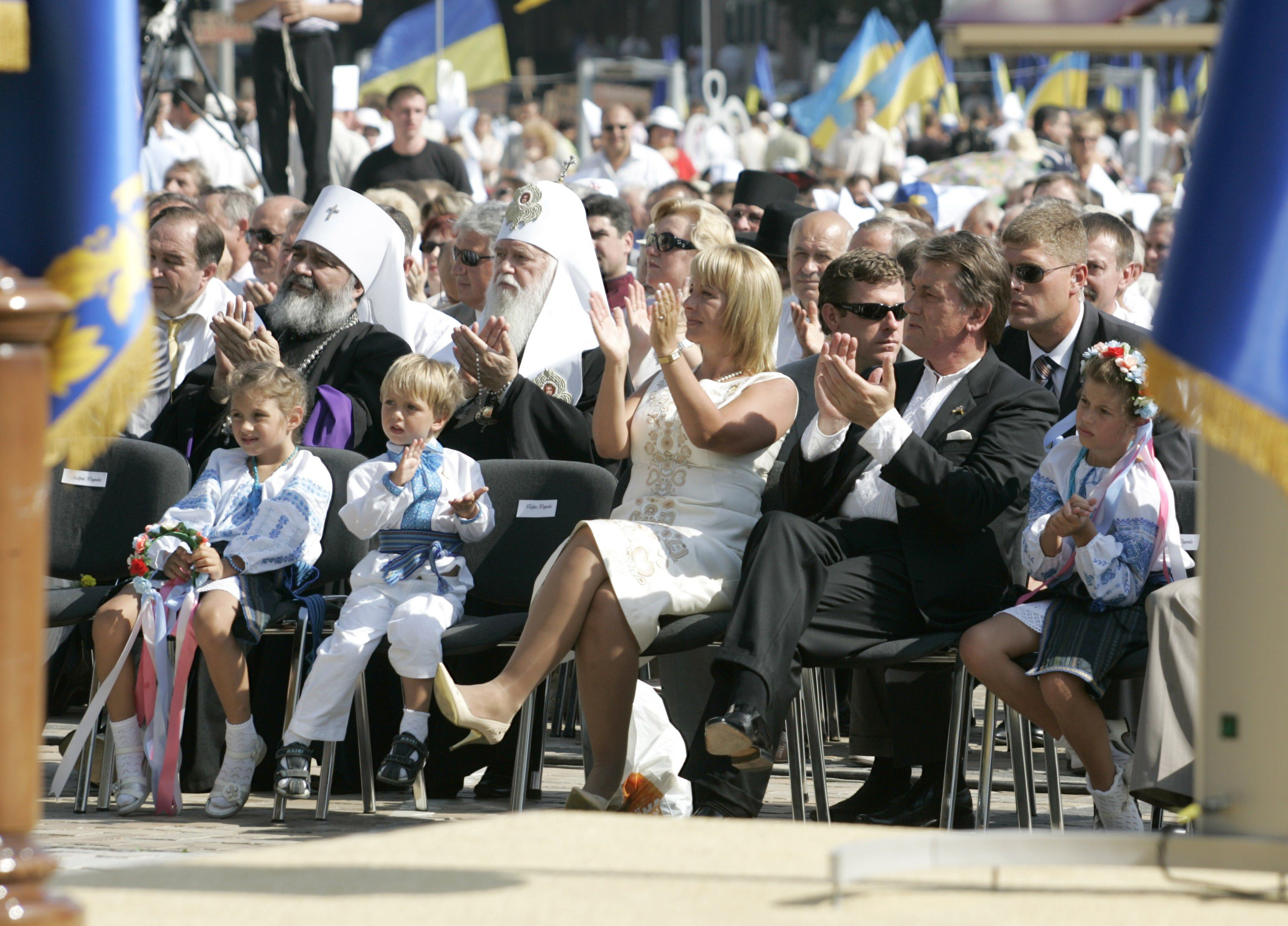
Filaret and Ukrainian president Viktor Yushchenko, Kyiv, 2007

After the death of Patriarch Mstyslav in 1993, the church was headed by Patriarch Volodymyr, and in July 1995, upon the death of Volodymyr, Filaret was elected head of the UOC-KP by a vote of 160–5.

Metropolitan Filaret consecrated at least 85 bishops.

On 11 October 2018, the Holy Synod of the Ecumenical Patriarchate of Constantinople announced that Filaret Denisenko, along with the Primate of UAOC, had been "restored to communion with the Church." The decision of the Ecumenical Patriarchate also abolished the Moscow Patriarchate's jurisdiction over the diocese of Kyiv and hence all the bishops concerned were viewed by the Ecumenical Patriarchate as being under its jurisdiction.

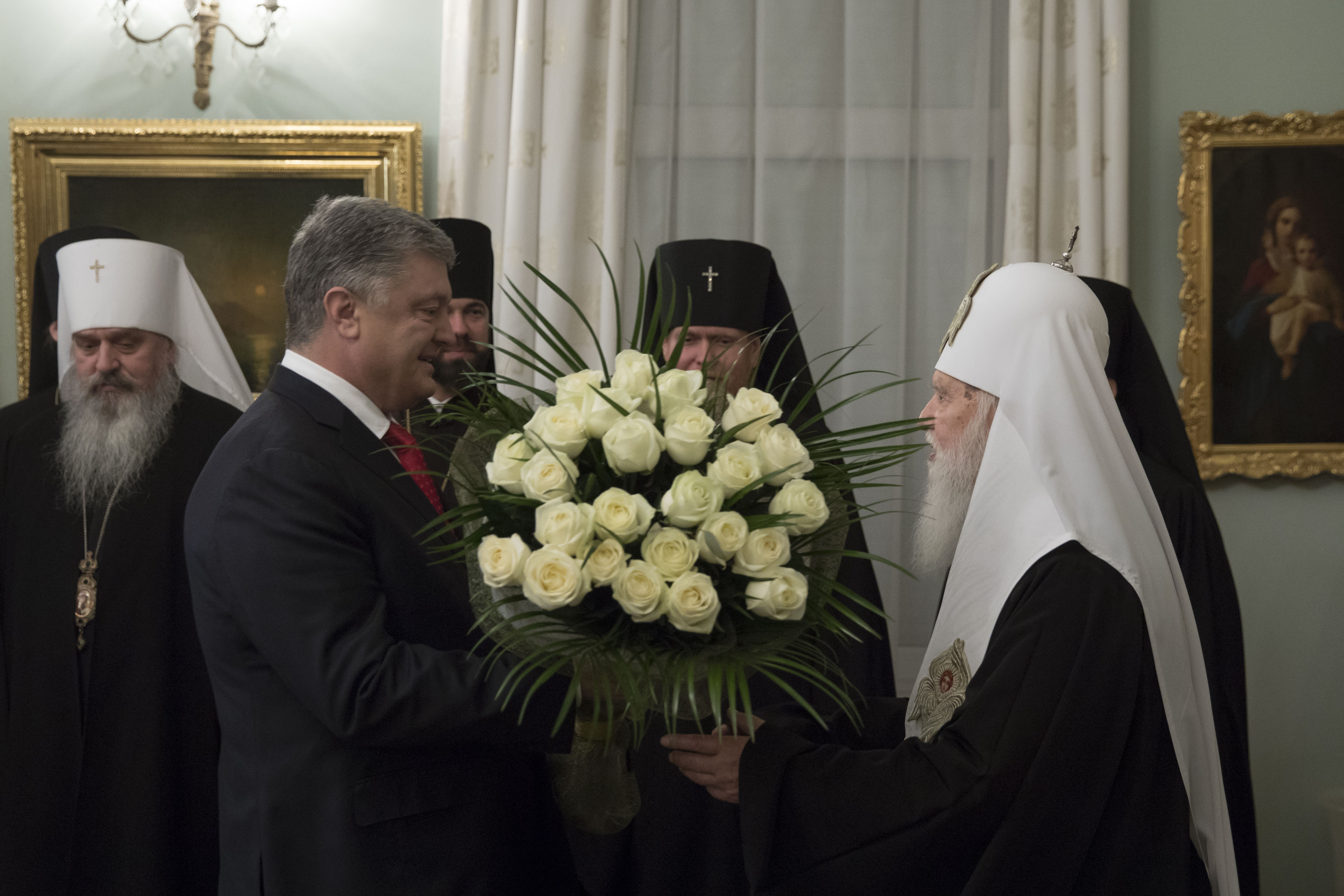
Filaret with Ukrainian president Petro Poroshenko, 21 October 2018

On 20 October 2018, the UOC-KP changed the title of its head, to "His Holiness and Beatitude (name), Archbishop and Metropolitan of Kyiv – Mother of the Rus Cities and of Galicia, Patriarch of All Rus-Ukraine, Holy Archimandrite of the Holy Assumption Kyiv-Pechersk and Pochaev Lavras". The abridged form is "His Holiness (name), Patriarch of Kyiv and All Rus'-Ukraine" and the form for interchurch relations "Archbishop, Metropolitan of Kyiv and All Rus'-Ukraine". The fact the full title and the version for interchurch relations mention the titles of "archbishop" and "metropolitan" and not the title of "patriarch", but that the abridged form mentioned only the title of "patriarch" has been confusing for some. The Russian Orthodox Church reacted by commenting that this new title was a "farce" and that for them Filaret "was and remains a schismatic".

Amid the 2022 Russian invasion of Ukraine, Filaret expressed in May 2022 his confidence that Ukraine would defeat Russia "because God is with Ukraine, not with Russia. God is with the truth, not with lies”, adding that this victory would also be a victory for Europe and all peaceful nations. He attacked the comments made by Patriarch Kirill of Moscow, calling him a liar, and questioned Pope Francis’s statements in which he suggested that Ukraine had provoked Russia.

== In the OCU ==
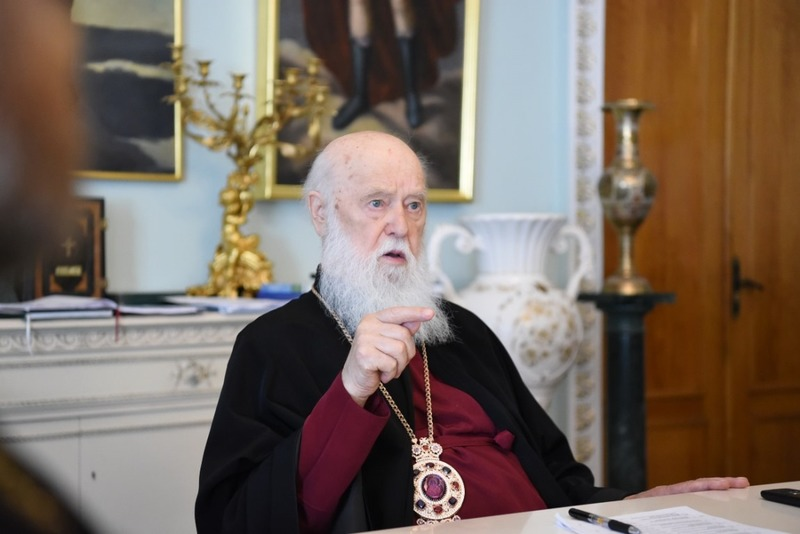
Filaret during a meeting with church priors in Kyiv, 2019

On 15 December 2018, the hierarchs of the UAOC decided to dissolve the UAOC, and the hierarchs of the UOC-KP decided to dissolve the UOC-KP. This was done because on the same day the Ukrainian Autocephalous Orthodox Church, the Ukrainian Orthodox Church – Kyiv Patriarchate, and some members of the Ukrainian Orthodox Church (Moscow Patriarchate) were going to merge to form the Orthodox Church of Ukraine (OCU) after a unification council. Filaret was given the title of the "honorary patriarch" of the Orthodox Church of Ukraine. Volodymyr Burega, Professor and Vice-Rector of the Kyiv Theological Academy, explains this title this way: "in December [2018], no one wanted to aggravate relationships with Patriarch Filaret, since holding the council and receiving the Tomos were at stake. That is why the council, which took place on 15 December, did not clarify the new status of Patriarch Filaret. After the unification council of the OCU, they stated that Filaret was henceforth "honorary patriarch", but what this phrase meant was difficult to understand. Indeed, such status is not stipulated in the Charter of the OCU, adopted on 15 December."

On 18 December 2018, Filaret's 90th birthday, 23 January 2019, was voted by the Ukrainian parliament as a day of national celebration for the year 2019.

On 16 January 2019, Filaret asked to be commemorated before Epiphanius, the primate of the OCU, during Divine Liturgies. He signed the document asking for it with "Filaret, Patriarch of Kyiv and All Rus'-Ukraine". On 20 January 2019, Filaret declared in an interview when asked about his role in the Orthodox Church of Ukraine: "I am a patriarch, I have been and I remain a patriarch. Today, the Head of the Local Church is Metropolitan Epifaniy, but I do not refuse to participate in the development of the Ukrainian Church. I am an unrecognized patriarch for world Orthodoxy, but for Ukraine I am a patriarch and I remain a patriarch".

On 5 February 2019, the Holy Synod of the OCU appointed Filaret the diocesan bishop of Kyiv, except for the St. Michael's Golden-Domed Monastery.

In an interview published by BBC Ukraine on 1 March 2019, Epiphanius of Kyiv explained the situation around Filaret as follows:

We are in a special situation because we united three branches of Ukrainian Orthodoxy. And His Holiness Patriarch Filaret built the Kyiv Patriarchate for more than a quarter of a century, and thanks to his work, we succeeded. Moscow has especially emphasized that Patriarch Filaret worked throughout his life for the sake of the koukoulion [i.e. to become Patriarch], that he did not become the Moscow Patriarch, became Patriarch of Kyiv, and would never give up power. We see the opposite, that the patriarch refused, went to the unification council. But nobody brought him to the patriarch's seat. Some want to completely eliminate him so that Patriarch Filaret did not exist at all, but that's wrong. He remains a diocesan bishop, and he will continue to work towards the building of the Ukrainian Orthodox Church. There is a leader, but he (Filaret) remains honorary Patriarch. He will continue to have his diocese – the city of Kyiv, but will not generally manage the whole church.

=== Conflict ===
A conflict erupted between Filaret and Epiphanius because of disagreements concerning the model of governance, the management of the diaspora, the name and the statute of the OCU. According to Filaret, the agreement reached at the unification council was as follows: "the primate is responsible for the external representation of the Ukrainian Orthodox Church (UOC), and the patriarch is responsible for the internal church life in Ukraine, but in cooperation with the primate. The primate shall do nothing in the church without the consent of the patriarch. The patriarch chairs the meetings of the Holy Synod and the UOC meetings for the sake of preserving unity, its growth, and affirmation." Filaret considers this agreement has not been fulfilled.

In November 2025, OCU's press service reported that a meeting between Filaret and Epiphanius had taken place in the metropolitan's residence, during which the patriarch received a letter of gratitude, and both church leaders took part in a common prayer for Ukraine's victory over Russia.

== Political views ==
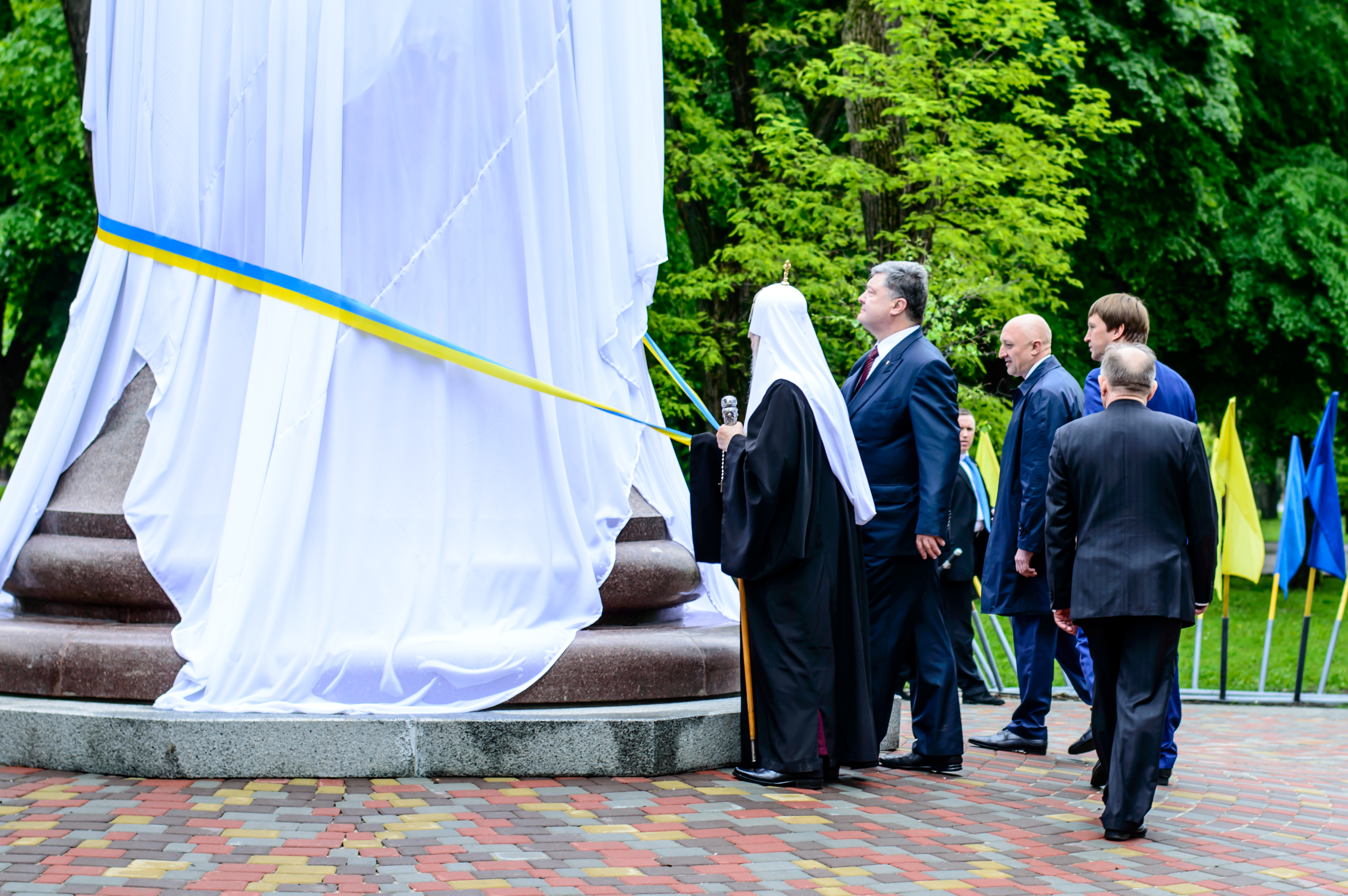
Filaret accompanying president Poroshenko during the unveiling of a monument to hetman Ivan Mazepa in Poltava, 2016

In March 2014, Filaret publicly opposed the annexation of Crimea by Russia. On 5 September 2014, amidst the 2014 Russian military intervention in Ukraine, Filaret held a service to consecrate a memorial cross to the Heavenly Hundred. Filaret declared during his service that in the Orthodox church had appeared "among the rulers of this world [...] a real new Cain" who "calls himself a brother to the Ukrainian people, but in fact according to his deeds [...] really became the new Cain, shedding the brotherly blood and entangling the whole world with lies" and that "Satan went into him, as into Judas Iscariot". The statement was published on the official website of the Ukrainian Orthodox Church – Kyiv Patriarchate in English, Russian and Ukrainian. Publications such as Church Times, Cogwriter, and Ecumenical News identified Filaret's "new Cain" with Russian president Vladimir Putin.

Filaret said that the local population in Donbas "must pay for their guilt [in rejecting Kyiv's authority] through suffering and blood".

In March 2020, during a TV interview, Filaret called the COVID-19 pandemic a "divine punishment" for same-sex marriage. He was later sued by Kyiv-based LGBT-rights group InSight for his remarks. Early September 2020, it was announced that Filaret himself had been tested positive for COVID-19 and admitted to hospital.

In an interview released in March 2020 to the Ukraine Channel 4, he declared that the Holy Eucharist could be administrated from one spoon, because it is impossible to get viruses from the gloriously resurrected Body of Jesus Christ God.

In February 2024, Filaret issued awards for Ukrainian service members, one of them being Viktor Pylypenko. When Filaret was informed that Pylypenko is gay, he cancelled his recognition, sparking condemnation from other soldiers.

== Death and burial ==
During the last months of his life, the metropolitan was hospitalized several times. On 20 March 2026, Metropolitan Epiphanius of Kyiv announced that Filaret had died earlier that day. He was 97. He was succeeded by Archbishop Nykodym of Sumy and Okhtyrka (formerly Volodymyr Kobzar) on 21 March.

On 22 March 2026, Filaret's coffin was placed in Kyiv's St. Michael's Cathedral, with hundreds of people gathering to bid farewell to the deceased. A funeral procession then followed through the streets of the city, ending in St. Volodymyr's Cathedral, where the burial ceremony took place.

== Awards ==
- Order "For intellectual courage" of the independent cultural magazine I (2018)

=== State awards ===
==== Ukraine ====
- Member of the Order of Liberty (2009)
- Order of Prince Yaroslav the Wise 1st (2008), 2nd (2006), 3rd (2004), 4th (2001) and 5th (1999) Cl.
- Cross of Ivan Mazepa (2010)
- Hero of Ukraine (2019)

==== USSR ====
- Order of Friendship of Peoples (1979)
- Order of the Red Banner of Labour (1988)

== List of bishop ordinations ==
The full list of Filaret's bishop ordinations until 2010 is as follows:

=== As a supporting archiereus ===
- Vladimir (Kotlyarov) on 30 December 1962 as Bishop of Zvenigorod
- Antonius (Vakaryk) on 12 February 1965 as Bishop of Smolensk and Dorogobuzh
- Boris (Skvortsov) on 21 February 1965 as Bishop of Ryazan and Kasimov
- Melchizedek (Lebedev) on 17 June 1965 as Bishop of Vologda and Velikiy Ustyug
- Philaret (Vakhromeyev) on 24 October 1965 as Bishop of Tikhvin
- Joanathan (Kopylovych) on 28 November 1965 as Bishop of Tegel
- John (Snychov) on 12 December 1965 as Bishop of Syzran
- Juvenal (Poyarkov) on 26 December 1965 as Bishop of Zaraisk
- Irenaeus (Susemihl) on 30 January 1966 as Bishop of Munich
- Dionysius (Lukin) on 20 March 1966 as Bishop of Rotterdam
- Volodymyr (Sabodan) on 9 July 1966 as Bishop of Zvenigorod
- Hermogenes (Orekhov) on 25 November 1966 as Bishop of Podolsk
- Theodosius (Dykun) on 4 June 1967 as Bishop of Pereyaslav-Khmelnytskyi
- Sabbas (Babynets) on 30 March 1969 as Bishop of Pereyaslav-Khmelnytskyi
- Macarius (Svystun) on 7 June 1970 as Bishop of Uman
- Maximus (Krokha) on 26 March 1972 as Bishop of Argentina and South America
- Victorinus (Belyaev) on 3 June 1973 as Bishop of Perm and Solikamsk
- Platon (Udovenko) on 16 December 1973 as Bishop of Argentina and South America
- Job (Tivonyuk) on 3 January 1975 as Bishop of Zaraisk
- Kirill (Gundyayev) on 14 March 1976 as Bishop of Vyborg
- Gleb (Smirnov) on 9 May 1976 as Bishop of Oryol and Bryansk
- Valentine (Mishchuk) on 25 July 1976 as Bishop of Ufa and Sterlitamak
- Nicanor (Yukhymyuk) on 30 November 1979 as Bishop of Podolsk

=== As a leading archiereus ===
- Nicholas (Bychkovsky) on 28 July 1971 as Bishop of Kursk and Belgorod
- Barlaam (Ilyuschenko) on 22 October 1972 as Bishop of Pereyaslav-Khmelnytskyi
- Agathangelos (Savvin) on 16 November 1975 as Bishop of Vinnytsia and Bratslav
- Sebastian (Pylypchuk) on 16 October 1978 as Bishop of Kirovohrad and Mykolaiv
- Ioann (Bodnarchuk) on 23 October 1978 as Bishop of Zhytomyr and Ovruch
- Lazar (Shvets) on 18 April 1980 as Bishop of Argentina and South America
- Antonius (Moskalenko) on 13 October 1986 as Bishop of Pereyaslav-Khmelnytskyi
- Palladius (Shyman) on 8 February 1987 as Bishop of Pereyaslav-Khmelnytskyi
- Marcus (Petrovtsy) on 28 July 1988 as Bishop of Kremenets
- Joannicius (Kobzyev) on 13 December 1988 as Bishop of Slovyansk
- Joanathan (Yeletskikh) on 22 April 1989 as Bishop of Pereyaslav-Khmelnytskyi
- Euthymius (Shutak) on 28 July 1989 as Bishop of Mukachevo and Uzhhorod
- Basilius (Vasyltsev) on 1 October 1989 as Bishop of Kirovohrad and Mykolaiv
- Bartholomeus (Vashchuk) on 24 February 1990 as Bishop of Volhynia and Rivne
- Niphont (Solodukha) on 31 March 1990 as Bishop of Khmelnytskyi and Kamianets-Podilskyi
- Andrew (Horak) on 18 April 1990 as Bishop of Lviv and Drohobych
- Gleb (Savin) on 2 August 1990 as Bishop of Dnipropetrovsk and Zaporizhia
- Basilius (Zlatolinsky) on 2 December 1990 as Bishop of Simferopol and Crimea
- Onuphrius (Berezovsky) on 9 December 1990 as Bishop of Chernivtsi and Bucovina
- Jacob (Panchuk) on 14 December 1990 as Bishop of Pochaiv
- Sergius (Hensytsky) on 17 February 1991 as Bishop of Kremenets
- Hilarion (Shukalo) on 29 September 1991 as Bishop of Ivano-Frankivsk and Kolomyia
- Alypius (Pohribnyak) on 6 October 1991 as Bishop of Donetsk and Luhansk
- Spyrydon (Babskyi) on 7 June 1992 as Bishop of Pereyaslav-Khmelnytskyi
- Barsanuphius (Mazurak) on 8 June 1992 as Bishop of Ivano-Frankivsk and Kolomyia
- Antonius (Masendych) on 9 September 1992 as Bishop of Pereyaslav and Sicheslav
- Volodymyr (Romaniuk) on 10 September 1992 as Bishop of Bila Tserkva
- Sophronius (Vlasov) on 15 September 1992 as Bishop of Vinnytsia and Bratslav
- Roman (Blashchuk) on 16 September 1992 as Bishop of Rivne and Ostroh
- Seraphim (Verzun) on 25 September 1992 as Bishop of Zhytomyr and Ovruch
- Nestor (Kulish) on 15 November 1992 as Bishop of Cherkasy and Chyhyryn
- Polycarp (Huts) on 10 April 1993 as Bishop of Donetsk and Luhansk
- Alexius (Tsaruk) on 7 July 1993 as Bishop of Mykolaiv
- Volodymyr (Ladyka) on 13 March 1993 as Bishop of Vinnytsia and Bratslav
- Alexander (Reshetnyak) on 16 January 1994 as Bishop of Bila Tserkva
- Daniel (Chokalyuk) on 23 January 1994 as Bishop of Vyshhorod
- Hadrian (Staryna) on 6 February 1994 as Bishop of Zaporizhia and Dnipropetrovsk
- Izyaslav (Karha) on 11 September 1994 as Bishop of Nikopol
- Theodosius (Petsyna) on 4 December 1994 as Bishop of Drohobych and Sambir
- Barlaam (Pylypyshyn) on 14 December 1994 as Bishop of Chernihiv and Sumy
- Joasaph (Shibayev) on 19 February 1995 as Bishop of Belgorod and Oboyan
- Baruch (Tischenkov) on 23 February 1994 as Bishop of Tobolsk and Yeniseysk
- Job (Pavlyshyn) on 11 May 1995 as Bishop of Kremenets and Zbarazh
- Gregorius (Kachan) on 10 October 1995 as Bishop of Melitopol
- Gerontius (Khovansky) on 24 March 1996 as Bishop of Sumy and Okhtyrka
- Ioann (Zinovyev) on 18 July 1996 as Bishop of Donetsk and Luhansk
- Antonius (Makhota) on 21 July 1996 as Bishop of Simferopol and Crimea
- Volodymyr (Polishchuk) on 23 February 1997 as Bishop of Ivano-Frankivsk and Kolomyia
- Joasaph (Vasylykiv) on 6 April 1997 as Bishop of Donetsk and Luhansk
- Pancratius (Tarnavsky) on 27 July 1997 as Bishop of Vinnytsia and Bratslav
- Christophorus (Sitas) on 2 October 1997 as Bishop of Surozh
- Nikon (Kalember) on 12 October 1997 as Bishop of Kitsman and Zastavna
- Damian (Zamarayev) on 19 October 1997 as Bishop of Kherson and Taurida
- Peter (Petrus) on 30 October 1997 as Bishop of Lviv and Yavoriv
- Yuriy Yurchyk on 14 May 1999 as George, Bishop of Donetsk and Luhansk
- Timotheus (Koutalianos) on 26 March 2000 as Bishop of Korsun
- Demetrius (Rudyuk) on 16 July 2000 as Bishop of Pereyaslav-Khmelnytskyi
- Clemence (Kushch) on 23 July 2000 as Bishop of Simferopol and Crimea
- Michael (Zinkevych) on 22 October 2000 as Bishop of Sumy and Okhtyrka
- Flavian (Pasichnyk) on 5 November 2000 as Bishop of Kharkiv and Bohodukhiv
- Paisius (Dmokhovsky) on 30 September 2001 as Bishop of Odesa and Balta
- Stephan (Bilyak) on 19 May 2002 as Bishop of Boryspil
- Eusebius (Politylo) on 7 July 2002 as Bishop of Poltava and Kremenchuk
- Sergius (Horobtsov) on 14 December 2002 as Bishop of Slovyansk
- Vsevolod (Matviyevsky) on 28 March 2003 as Bishop of Luhansk and Starobilsk
- Ioann (Yaremenko) on 30 March 2003 as Bishop of Cherkasy and Chyhyryn
- Cyril (Mykhailyuk) on 3 August 2003 as Bishop of Uzhhorod and Zakarpattia
- Methodius (Sribnyak) on 6 June 2004 as Bishop of Sumy and Okhtyrka
- Theodosius (Paikush) on 28 July 2004 as Bishop of Chernihiv and Nizhyn
- Chrysostom (Bakomitros) on 14 May 2005 as Bishop of Chersonesus
- Philaret (Pancu) on 31 July 2005 as Bishop of Făleşti and Eastern Moldova
- Onuphrius (Khavruk) on 30 October 2005 as Bishop of Derman
- Michael (Bondarchuk) on 1 January 2006 as Bishop of Poltava and Kremenchuk
- Nestor (Pysyk) on 5 March 2006 as Bishop of Ternopil and Buchach
- Theodore (Bubnyuk) on 12 November 2006 as Bishop of Poltava and Kremenchuk
- Sebastian (Voznyak) on 14 December 2006 as Bishop of Chernihiv and Nizhyn
- Matheus (Shevchuk) on 17 December 2006 as Bishop of Drohobych and Sambir
- Hilarion (Protsyk) on 14 May 2008 as Bishop of Chernihiv and Nizhyn
- Eustratius (Zorya) on 25 May 2008 as Bishop of Vasylkiv
- Peter (Moskalyov) on 13 December 2008 as Bishop of Valuiky
- Marcus (Levkiv) on 1 February 2009 as Bishop of Kirovohrad and Holovanivsk
- Paul (Kravchuk) on 30 March 2009 as Bishop of Ternopil and Terebovlia
- Epiphanius (Dumenko) on 15 November 2009 as Bishop of Vyshhorod
- Simeon (Zinkevych) on 21 November 2009 as Bishop of Dnipropetrovsk and Pavlohrad
- Tycho (Petranyuk) on 22 November 2009 as Bishop of Luhansk and Starobilsk

== See also ==
- History of Christianity in Ukraine
- List of metropolitans and patriarchs of Kyiv

== Notes ==
Eastern Orthodox Church titles
| Preceded by Aleksiy (Konoplev) | Bishop of Luga (Vicar of Leningrad Eparchy) (Russian Orthodox Church); 1962 | Succeeded by Nikon (Fomichev) |
| Preceded by Ioann (Vendland) | Locum tenens governor of Middle-European Exarchate (Russian Orthodox Church); 1962 | Succeeded by Sergiy (Larin) |
| Preceded by Sergiy (Korolev) | Bishop of Vienna and Austrian (Russian Orthodox Church); 1962–1964 | Succeeded by Varfolomei (Gondarovskiy) |
| Preceded by Kiprian (Zernov) | Bishop of Dmitrov (Vicar of Moscow Eparchy) (Russian Orthodox Church); 1964–1966 | Succeeded by Philaret (Vakhromeyev) |
| Preceded by Joasaph (Leliukhin); Alipiy (Khotovitskiy) (interim) | Metropolitan of Kyiv and Galicia (Patriarchal Exarch of all Ukraine) (Russian Orthodox Church); 1966–1990 | Vacant Reorganization |
| Preceded by Pimen (Izvekov) | (Locum tenens) patriarch of Moscow and all Russia (Russian Orthodox Church); 1990 | Succeeded by Aleksiy (Ridiger) |
| New title Reorganization | Metropolitan of Kyiv and all Ukraine (Russian and Ukrainian Orthodox Church); 1990–1992 | Succeeded by Volodymyr (Sabodan) |
| Preceded by Volodymyr (Romaniuk) | Patriarch of Kyiv and all Rus-Ukraine (Ukrainian Orthodox Church of the Kyivan Patriarchate); 1995–2018 | Merged into the Orthodox Church of Ukraine |
| New title | Honorary Patriarch (Orthodox Church of Ukraine); 2018–2019 | Vacant |
| New title Reestablished from the Orthodox Church of Ukraine | Patriarch of Kyiv and all Rus-Ukraine (Ukrainian Orthodox Church of the Kyivan Patriarchate); 2019–2026 | Vacant |
