= Bishop of Kyiv =

Bishop of Kyiv can refer to:

- Metropolitan of Kiev and all Rus' (988-1685)
- Bishop of Kyiv (Roman Catholic) (since early 14th century)
- The Greek Catholic Metropolitan of Kyiv (1596–1838) or Major Archbishop of Kyiv-Galicia (since 2000)
- The Ukrainian Orthodox Church (Moscow Patriarchate) Metropolitan of Kyiv (since 1685)
- The Orthodox Church of Ukraine Metropolitan of Kyiv (since 2018)
  - The Ukrainian Autocephalous Orthodox Church Metropolitan of Kyiv (1921–1936, 1942–1953, 2000–2018) or Patriarch of Kyiv and All Rus-Ukraine (1990–2000)
  - The Ukrainian Orthodox Church – Kyiv Patriarchate Patriarch of Kyiv and All Rus-Ukraine (1992–2018)
