= Andriy Horak =

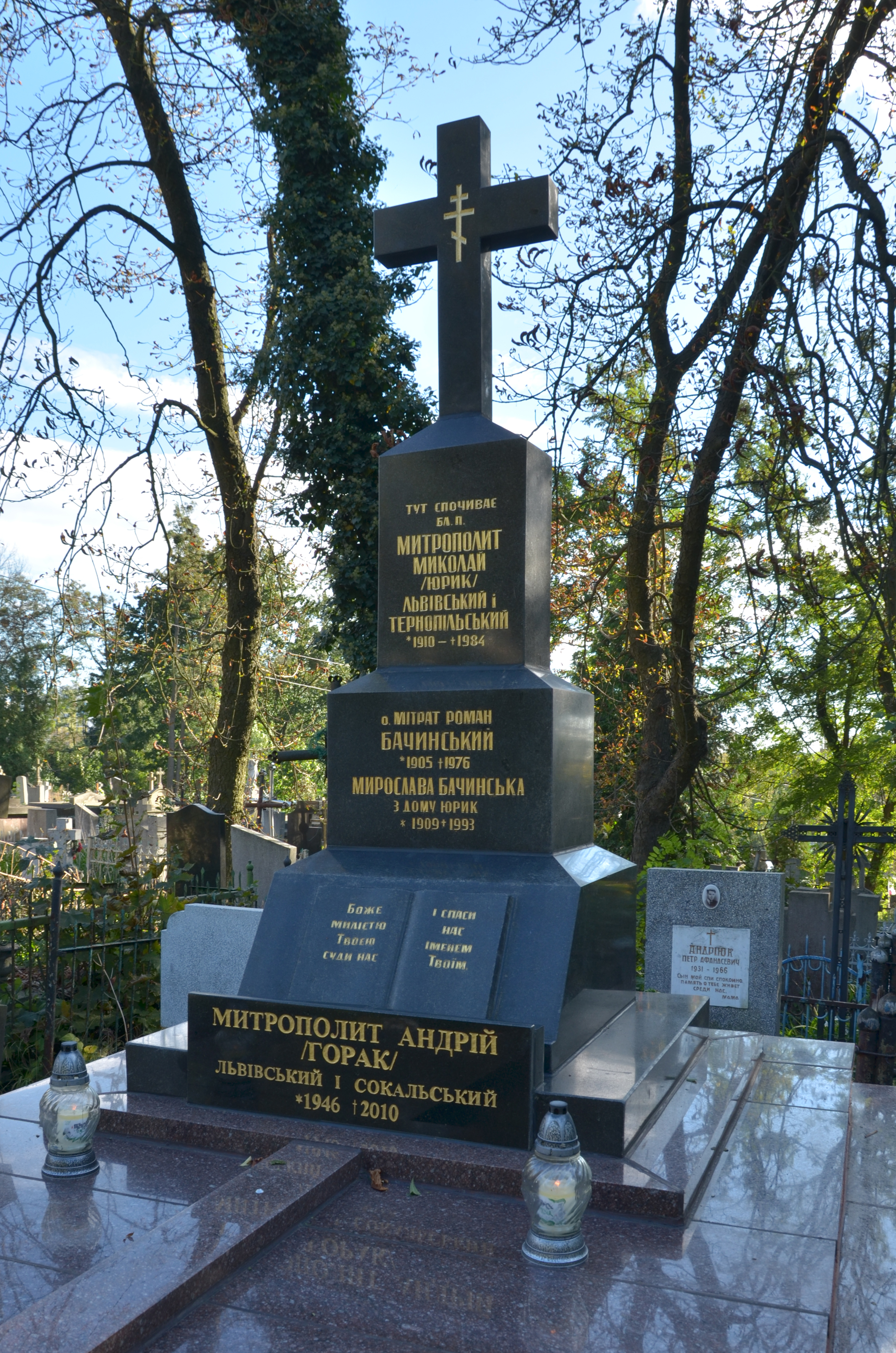
Tomb of Andrii Horak

Andriy Hrihorovych Horak (Ukrainian: Андрій Григорович Горак; March 1, 1946 – July 5, 2010) was an Eastern Orthodox bishop.

Horak was the Metropolitan bishop of Lviv and Sokol, Ukraine, in Ukrainian Orthodox Church of the Kyivan Patriarchate from 1993 until his death.
