= Ukrainian Autocephalous Orthodox Church Canonical =

Independent Orthodox Church

Ukrainian Autocephalous Orthodox Church Canonical (UAOC-C) is an independent Orthodox Church, that declares its canonical origin from the Polish Orthodox Church. As of 2024, it is unrecognized by the wider Eastern Orthodox Church.

== History ==
=== From the Ukrainian Orthodox Church ===
Metropolitan Dionysius was elevated into the episcopacy in 1913 by Gregorios IV, the Greek Orthodox Patriarch of Antioch, who is considered as having the ordination in the lineage of the Apostle Peter.

In 1932, Metropolitan Dionisius ordained Metropolitan Polycarp (Sikorsky), and in 1942, appointed him to the Nazi-occupied Ukraine for the renewing of UAOC and ordination of new bishops. Thus, all the hierarchy of UAOC in 1942 received the canonical ordinations of bishops in the lineage of Apostle Peter from a successor to the early Church of Antioch. Among the ordained bishops were the deceased Patriarch Mstyslav (Skrypnyk) and Metropolitan Hryhoriy Ohiychuk.

=== UAOC-Sobornopravna ===
In October 2002, in the USA was held the council of the hierarchs of UAOC-Sobornopravna of North and South America – the branch from Polish Orthodox Church that was headed by Metropolitan Hryhoriy (Ohiychuk) and after his death in 1985; by Metropolitan Andriy (Prazsky) (1985–90); then by Metropolitan Alexis (Nizza) (1990–99); and then by Metropolitan Stephan (Babiy-Petrovich) (1999–2004). The council of the hierarchs of UAOC-Sobornopravna, having considered the current situation of UAOC in Ukraine, decreed to:

- return the ancient patriarchal model to the church system of UAOC-Sobornopravna;
- resume the presence on the Ukrainian land by the establishment of Archdiocese of Kyiv and All Rus-Ukraine;
- elevate Archimandrite Moses (Koulik) into the dignity of bishop and assign in the rank of Metropolitan of Kyiv and All Rus-Ukraine to Ukraine for the establishment of Archdiocese of Kyiv and All Rus-Ukraine.

On 10 October 2002, the consecration and elevation to the rank of Metropolitan of Kyiv and All Rus-Ukraine of Bishop Moses (Koulik) took place in the Boris and Gleb Cathedral of city Cleveland, Ohio, USA. Metropolitan Moses is assigned to Ukraine "for the re-establishment of Kyivan Metropolitanate and the revival of UAOC-Sobornopravna in Ukraine with the right to complete administrative management and spiritual care".

On 1 November 2002, in a press-conference held, Metropolitan Stephan (Babiy-Petrovich), the primate of the UAOC-Sobornopravna of North and South America, dedicated to the historical Council of UAOC-Sobornopravna hierarchs and its decision as for return of church from the diaspora to the territory of Ukraine.

In 2004–2005, UAOC-Sobornopravna in the USA saw events that changed cardinally the status of the UAOC-Sobornopravna in Ukraine. The UAOC-Sobornopravna of North and South America became UAOC of North and South America and Diaspora and; headed by metropolitan Mykhayil (Yavchak-Champion) joined with UAOC in Ukraine, declaring Metropolitan Mefodiy (Kudriakov) to be their primate.

The UAOC-Sobornopravna in Ukraine, headed by Metropolitan Moses, kept apart from this union and acquired the status of independent jurisdiction. Metropolitan Moses realized the active educational work, converting into Christianity a great number of atheists in the post-totalitarian Ukraine and called upon the unification of the scattered Ukrainians all over the world.

=== UAOC-Canonical ===
On 17–18 June 2005, on the Feast of the Holy Trinity, in Kyiv, the hierarchical council of the UAOC-Sobornopravna under the omophorion of Moses, Metropolitan of Kyiv and All Rus-Ukraine took place, where the name of the church was asserted as UAOC-Canonical by the decision of the holy synod and by the decision of the denomination's ecumenical hierarchs council.

== Patriarch ==
On 17–18 June 2005, by the decision of the Holy Synod and by the decision of the Ecumenical Bishop's Council of UAOC-Canonical, Metropolitan Moses was elected and enthroned into the dignity of Patriarch of Kyiv and All Rus-Ukraine. Twelve hierarchs, the clergy and the hundreds of the faithful from all over the world took part in the council. The enthronement took place on the Feast of the Holy Trinity in the Saint Sophia Cathedral in Kyiv.

== Doctrine ==
Ukrainian Autocephalous Orthodox Church-Canonical acknowledges the absolute faith in the teaching of Jesus Christ, the faith in the Holy Scripture and in the Apostolic Canons. The clergy have the canonical ordinations from Jesus Christ in the lineage of the Apostle Peter.

== See also ==
- Patriarch Moses (Koulik)
- History of Christianity in Ukraine
- Ukrainian Orthodox Church of the USA
- Ukrainian Orthodox Church of Canada
- Eastern Orthodox Church
- Eastern Orthodox Church organization
