= Eastern Orthodox Church =

Second-largest Christian church

Orthodox Catholic Church
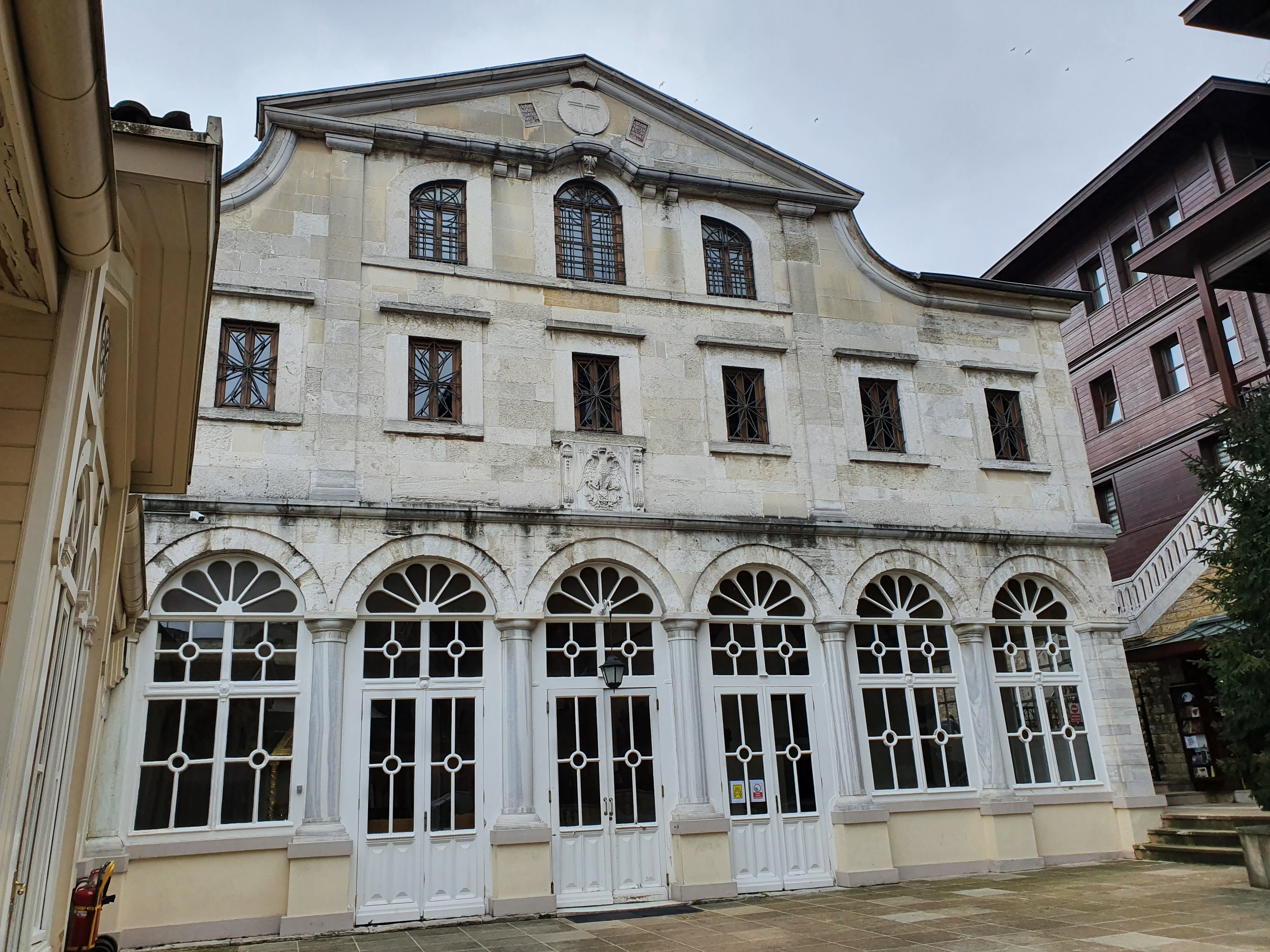
- Saint George's Cathedral in Istanbul, Turkey
- Classification: Christianity
- Orientation: Eastern Orthodoxy
- Scripture: Septuagint; New Testament
- Theology: Eastern Orthodox theology
- Polity: Episcopal
- Structure: Communion
- Primus inter pares: Bartholomew, Ecumenical Patriarch of Constantinople
- Region: Primarily Southeastern Europe, Eastern Europe, Northern Asia, Levant, Egypt, Northern America, Near East, Caucasia, Cyprus
- Language: Koine Greek, Church Slavonic, and other vernacular
- Liturgy: Byzantine Rite (predominant); Western Rite
- Founder: Jesus Christ, according to sacred tradition
- Origin: 1st century Judaea, Roman Empire
- Separations: Several Eastern Catholic Churches; Old Believers (1660s); Old Calendarists (1920s)
- Members: 220,266,000 (2020)
- Other names: Orthodox Church, Orthodox Christian Church, Eastern Orthodox Church

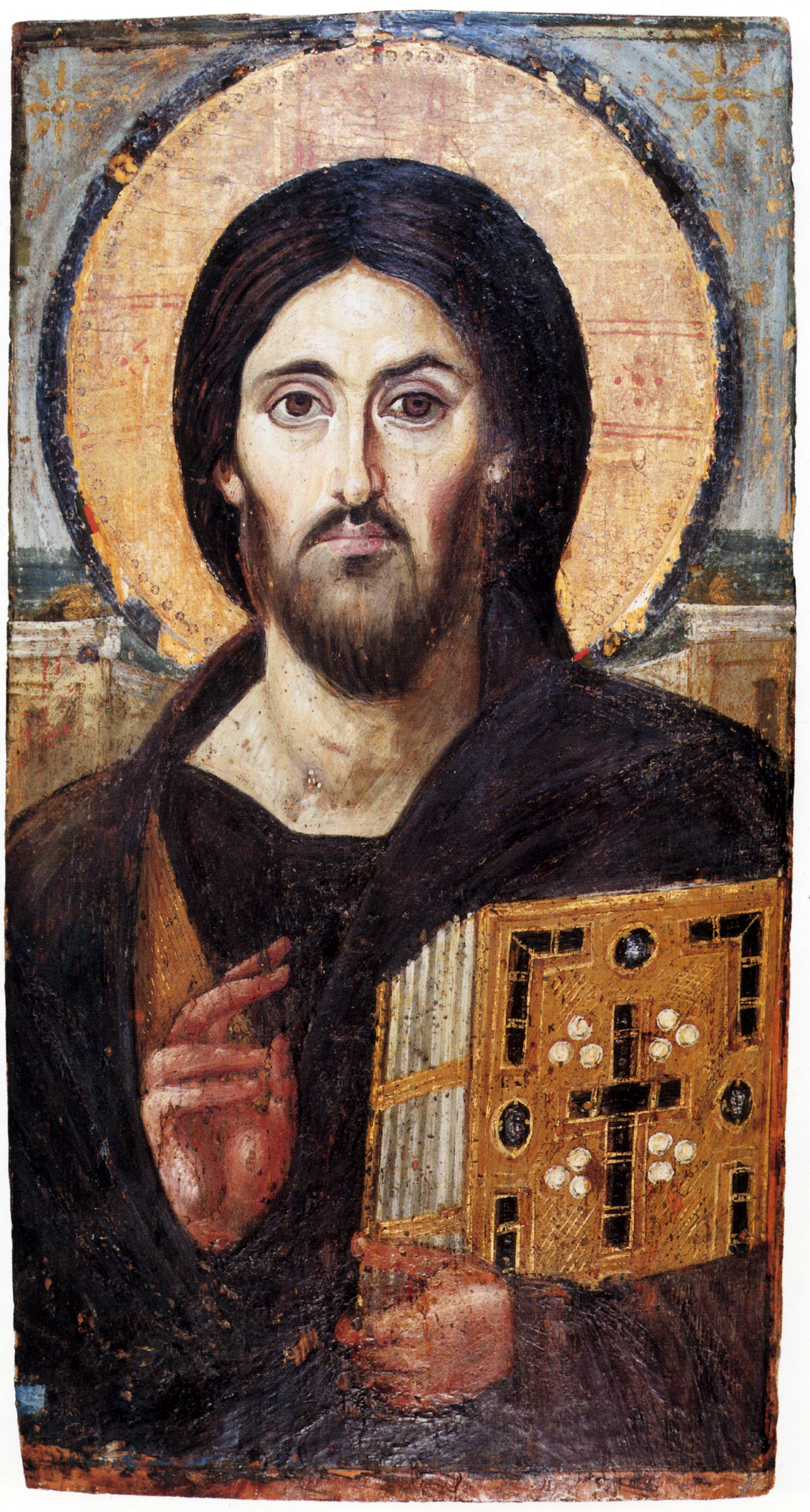
Christ Pantocrator, sixth century, Saint Catherine's Monastery, Sinai; the oldest known icon of Christ, in one of the oldest monasteries in the world

The Eastern Orthodox Church, officially the Orthodox Catholic Church, also known as the Greek Orthodox Church is the second-largest Christian body in the world after the Roman Catholic Church, and one of the six major doctrinal and jurisdictional groups of Christianity.

The Eastern Orthodox Church operates as a communion of autocephalous churches, each governed by its bishops via local synods. The church has no central doctrinal or governmental authority analogous to the pope of the Roman Catholic Church. Nevertheless, the Ecumenical Patriarch of Constantinople is recognised by them as primus inter pares ('first among equals'), a title held by the patriarch of Rome prior to the East–West Schism.

As one of the oldest surviving religious institutions in the world, the Eastern Orthodox Church has played an especially prominent role in the history and culture of Eastern and Southeastern Europe. Since 2018, there has been an ongoing schism between Constantinople and Moscow, with the two not in full communion with each other.

Eastern Orthodox theology is based on the Scriptures and holy tradition, which incorporates the dogmatic decrees of the seven ecumenical councils, and the teaching of the Church Fathers. The church teaches that it is the one, holy, catholic and apostolic church established by Jesus Christ in his Great Commission, and that its bishops are the successors of Christ's apostles. It maintains that it practises the original Christian faith, as passed down by holy tradition. Its patriarchates, descending from the pentarchy, and other autocephalous and autonomous churches, reflect a variety of hierarchical organisation. It recognises seven major sacraments (which are called holy mysteries), of which the Eucharist is the principal one, celebrated liturgically in synaxis.

The Eastern Orthodox biblical canon contains 76 to 79 bible books depending on the local tradition. The church teaches that through consecration invoked by a priest, the sacrificial bread and wine become the body and blood of Christ. The Virgin Mary is venerated in the Eastern Orthodox Church as the Theotokos, which means 'God-bearer', and she is honoured in devotions.

The churches of Constantinople, Alexandria, Jerusalem, and Antioch—except for some breaks of communion such as the Photian schism or the Acacian schism—shared communion with the Church of Rome until the East–West Schism in 1054. The 1054 schism was the culmination of mounting theological, political, and cultural disputes, particularly over the authority of the pope, between those churches. Before the Council of Ephesus in AD 431, the Church of the East also shared in this communion, as did the various Oriental Orthodox Churches before the Council of Chalcedon in AD 451, all separating primarily over differences in Christology.

The Eastern Orthodox Church is the primary religious confession in Russia, Ukraine, Romania, Greece, Belarus, Serbia, Bulgaria, Georgia, Moldova, North Macedonia, Cyprus, and Montenegro. Eastern Orthodox Christians are also one of the main religious groups in Estonia, Bosnia and Herzegovina, Kosovo and Latvia as well as a significant group in Syria, Lebanon, and other countries in the Middle East. Roughly half of Eastern Orthodox Christians live in the post Eastern Bloc countries, mostly in Russia. The communities in the former Byzantine regions of North Africa and the Eastern Mediterranean are among the oldest Orthodox communities from the Middle East, which are decreasing due to forced migration driven by increased religious persecution. Eastern Orthodox communities outside Western Asia, Asia Minor, Caucasia and Eastern Europe, including those in North America, Western Europe, and Australia, have been formed through diaspora, conversions, and missionary activity.

== Name and characteristics ==
=== Definition ===
The Eastern Orthodox Church is defined as the Eastern Christians which recognise the seven ecumenical councils and usually are in communion with the Ecumenical Patriarchate, the Patriarchate of Alexandria, the Patriarchate of Antioch, and the Patriarchate of Jerusalem. The Eastern Orthodox churches "are defined positively by their adherence to the dogmatic definitions of the seven [ecumenical] councils, by the strong sense of not being a sect or a denomination but simply continuing the Christian church, and, despite their varied origins, by adherence to the Byzantine rite". Those churches are negatively defined by their rejection of papal immediate and universal supremacy.

The seven ecumenical councils recognised by the Eastern Orthodox churches are: Nicaea I, Constantinople I, Ephesus, Chalcedon, Constantinople II, Constantinople III, and Nicaea II. These churches consider the Quinisext Council as "shar[ing] the ecumenical authority of Constantinople III." "By an agreement that appears to be in place in the [Eastern] Orthodox world, possibly the council held in 879 to vindicate the Patriarch Photius will at some future date be recognized as the eighth [ecumenical] council" by the Eastern Orthodox Church.

Western Rite Orthodoxy exists both outside and inside Eastern Orthodoxy. Within Eastern Orthodoxy, it is practised by a vicariate of the Antiochian Orthodox church. The Antiochian Orthodox Archdiocese of North America estimated there are 1,416 members of the Western Rite vicariate in 24 parishes. With roughly 3,000 members worldwide, spread across about 50 scattered parishes, Western Rite Orthodoxy remains a very small minority within the Eastern Orthodox Church.

=== Name ===
The official name of the Eastern Orthodox Church is the "Orthodox Catholic Church". It is the name by which the church refers to itself and which is issued in its liturgical or canonical texts. Eastern Orthodox theologians refer to the church as Catholic. This name and longer variants containing "Catholic" are also recognised and referenced in other books and publications by secular or non-Eastern Orthodox writers. The catechism of Philaret (Drozdov) of Moscow published in the 19th century is titled: The Longer Catechism of the Orthodox, Catholic, Eastern Church (Russian: Пространный христианский катехизис православныя, кафолическия восточныя Церкви).

In keeping with the church's teaching on universality and with the Nicene Creed, Eastern Orthodox authorities such as Raphael of Brooklyn have insisted that the full name of the church has always included the term "Catholic", as in "Holy Orthodox Catholic Apostolic Church".

From ancient times through the first millennium, Greek was the most prevalent shared language in the demographic regions where the Byzantine Empire flourished, and Greek, being the language in which the New Testament was written, was the primary liturgical language of the church. For this reason, the eastern churches were sometimes identified as "Greek" (in contrast to the "Roman" or "Latin" church, which used a Latin translation of the Bible), even before the Great Schism of 1054. After 1054, "Greek Orthodox" or "Greek Catholic" marked a church as being in communion with Constantinople, much as "Catholic" did for communion with the Catholic Church.

In Hungarian, the church is still commonly called "Eastern Greek" (Hungarian: Görögkeleti). This identification with Greek, however, became increasingly confusing with time. Missionaries brought Eastern Orthodoxy to many regions without ethnic Greeks, where the Greek language was not spoken. In addition, struggles between Rome and Constantinople to control parts of Southeastern Europe resulted in the conversion of some churches to the Catholic Church, which then also used "Greek Catholic" to indicate their continued use of the Byzantine rites. Today, only a minority of Eastern Orthodox adherents use Greek as the language of worship.

"Eastern", then, indicates the geographical element in the church's origin and development, while "Orthodox" indicates the faith, as well as communion with the Ecumenical Patriarchate of Constantinople. There are additional Christian churches in the east that are in communion with neither the Catholic Church nor the Eastern Orthodox Church, who tend to be distinguished by the category named "Oriental Orthodox". While the Eastern Orthodox Church continues officially to call itself "Catholic", for reasons of universality, the common title of "Eastern Orthodox Church" avoids casual confusion with the Catholic Church.

=== Orthodoxy ===
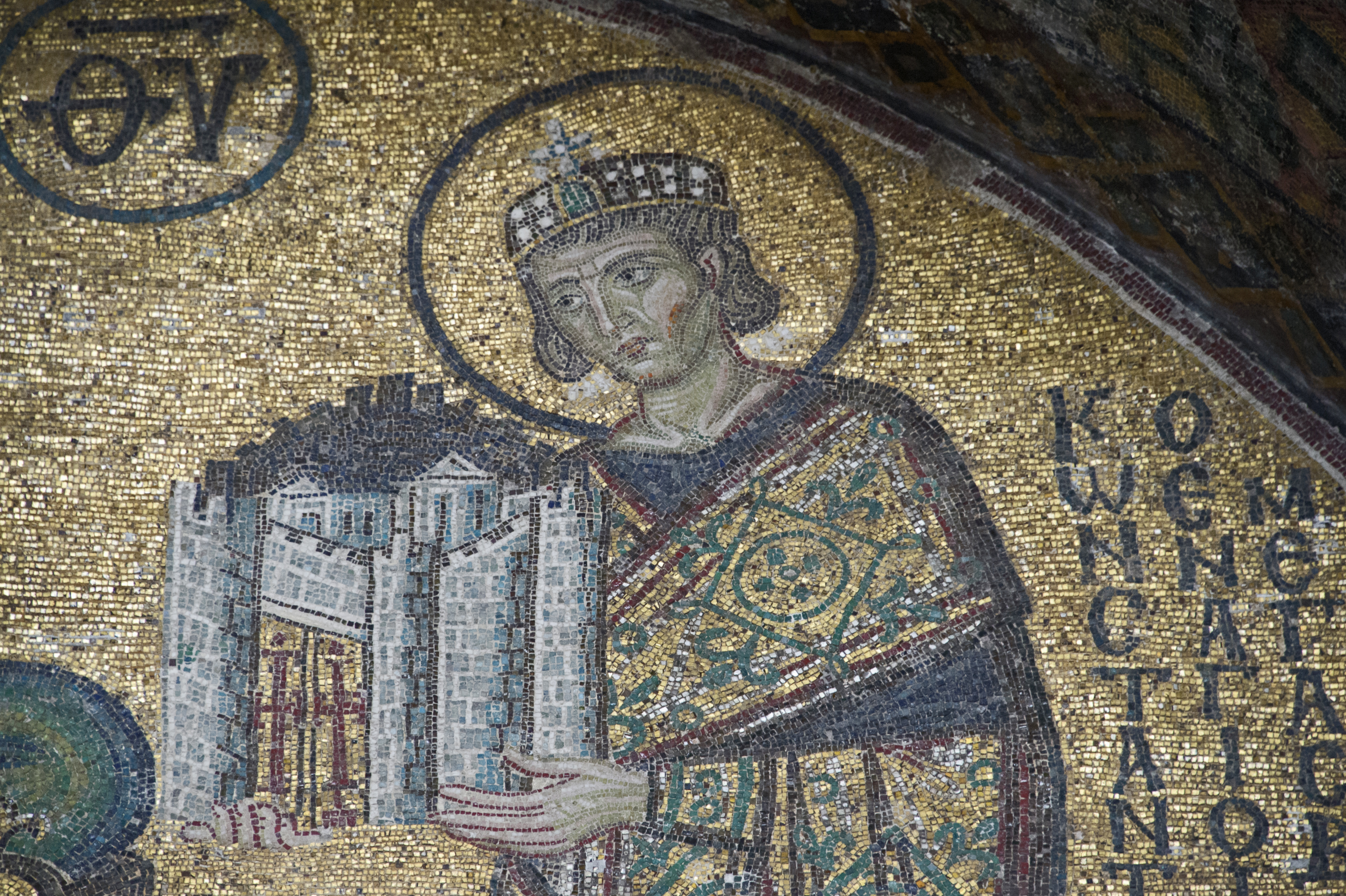
Emperor Constantine presents a representation of the city of Constantinople as tribute to an enthroned Mary and baby Jesus in this church mosaic (Hagia Sophia, c. 1000).

The first known use of the phrase "the catholic Church" (he katholike ekklesia) occurred in a letter written c. AD 110 from one Greek church to another (Ignatius of Antioch to the Smyrnaeans). The letter states: "Wheresoever the bishop shall appear, there let the people be, even as where Jesus may be, there is the universal [katholike] Church." Thus, almost from the beginning, Christians referred to the Christian Church as the "one, holy, catholic (from the Greek καθολική, 'according to the whole, universal') and apostolic Church". The Eastern Orthodox Church claims that it is today the continuation and preservation of that same early church.

A number of other Christian churches also make a similar claim: the Catholic Church, the Anglican Communion, the Church of the East, and the Oriental Orthodox. In the Eastern Orthodox view, the Church of the East and Oriental Orthodox left the Orthodox Church in the years following the Third Ecumenical Council of Ephesus (431) and the Fourth Ecumenical Council of Chalcedon (451), respectively, in their refusal to accept those councils' Christological definitions; conversely, the latter two churches hold the same view towards the Eastern Orthodox Church regarding each respective council. Similarly, the churches in Rome and Constantinople separated in an event known as the East–West Schism, traditionally dated to the year 1054, although it was more a gradual process than a sudden break.

To all these churches, the claim to catholicity (universality, oneness with the ancient Church) is important for multiple doctrinal reasons that have more bearing internally in each church than in their relation to the others, now separated in faith. The meaning of holding to a faith that is true is the primary reason why anyone's statement of which church split off from which other has any significance at all; the issues go as deep as the schisms. The depth of this meaning in the Eastern Orthodox Church is registered first in its use of the word "Orthodox" itself, a union of Greek orthos ("straight", "correct", "true", "right") and doxa ("common belief", from the ancient verb δοκέω-δοκῶ which is translated "to believe", "to think", "to consider", "to imagine", "to assume").

The dual meanings of doxa, with "glory" or "glorification" (of God by the church and of the church by God), especially in worship, yield the pair "correct belief" and "true worship". Together, these express the core of a fundamental teaching about the inseparability of belief and worship and their role in drawing the church together with Christ. All Slavic Orthodox churches use the title Pravoslavie (Cyrillic: Православие), meaning "correctness of glorification", to denote what is in English Orthodoxy, while the Georgians use the title Martlmadidebeli (Georgian: მართლმადიდებელი).

The term "Eastern Church" (the geographic east in the East–West Schism) has been used to distinguish it from western Christendom (the geographic West, which at first came to designate the Catholic communion, later also the various Protestant and Anglican branches). "Eastern" is used to indicate that the highest concentrations of the Eastern Orthodox Church presence remain in the eastern part of the Christian world, although it is growing worldwide. Orthodox Christians throughout the world use various ethnic or national jurisdictional titles, or more inclusively, the title "Eastern Orthodox", "Orthodox Catholic", or simply "Orthodox".

What unites Orthodox Christians is the catholic faith as carried through holy tradition. That faith is expressed most fundamentally in scripture and worship, and the latter most essentially through baptism and in the Divine Liturgy.

The lines of even this test can blur, however, when differences that arise are not due to doctrine, but to recognition of jurisdiction. As the Eastern Orthodox Church has spread into the West and over the world, the church as a whole has yet to sort out all the inter-jurisdictional issues that have arisen in the expansion, leaving some areas of doubt about what is proper church governance. Moreover, as in the ancient church persecutions, the aftermath of persecutions of Christians in communist nations has complicated some issues of governance that have yet to be completely resolved.

All members of the Eastern Orthodox Church profess the same faith, regardless of race or nationality, jurisdiction or local custom, or century of birth. Holy tradition encompasses the understandings and means by which that unity of faith is transmitted across boundaries of time, geography, and culture. It is a continuity that exists only inasmuch as it lives within Christians themselves. It is not static, nor an observation of rules, but rather a sharing of observations that spring both from within and also in keeping with others, even others who lived lives long past. The church proclaims the Holy Spirit maintains the unity and consistency of holy tradition to preserve the integrity of the faith within the church, as given in the scriptural promises.

Orthodoxy asserts that its shared beliefs, and its theology, exist within holy tradition and cannot be separated from it, and that their meaning is not expressed in mere words alone; that doctrine cannot be understood unless it is prayed; and that it must also be lived in order to be prayed, that without action, the prayer is idle, empty, and in vain, and therefore the theology of demons.

=== Catholicity ===
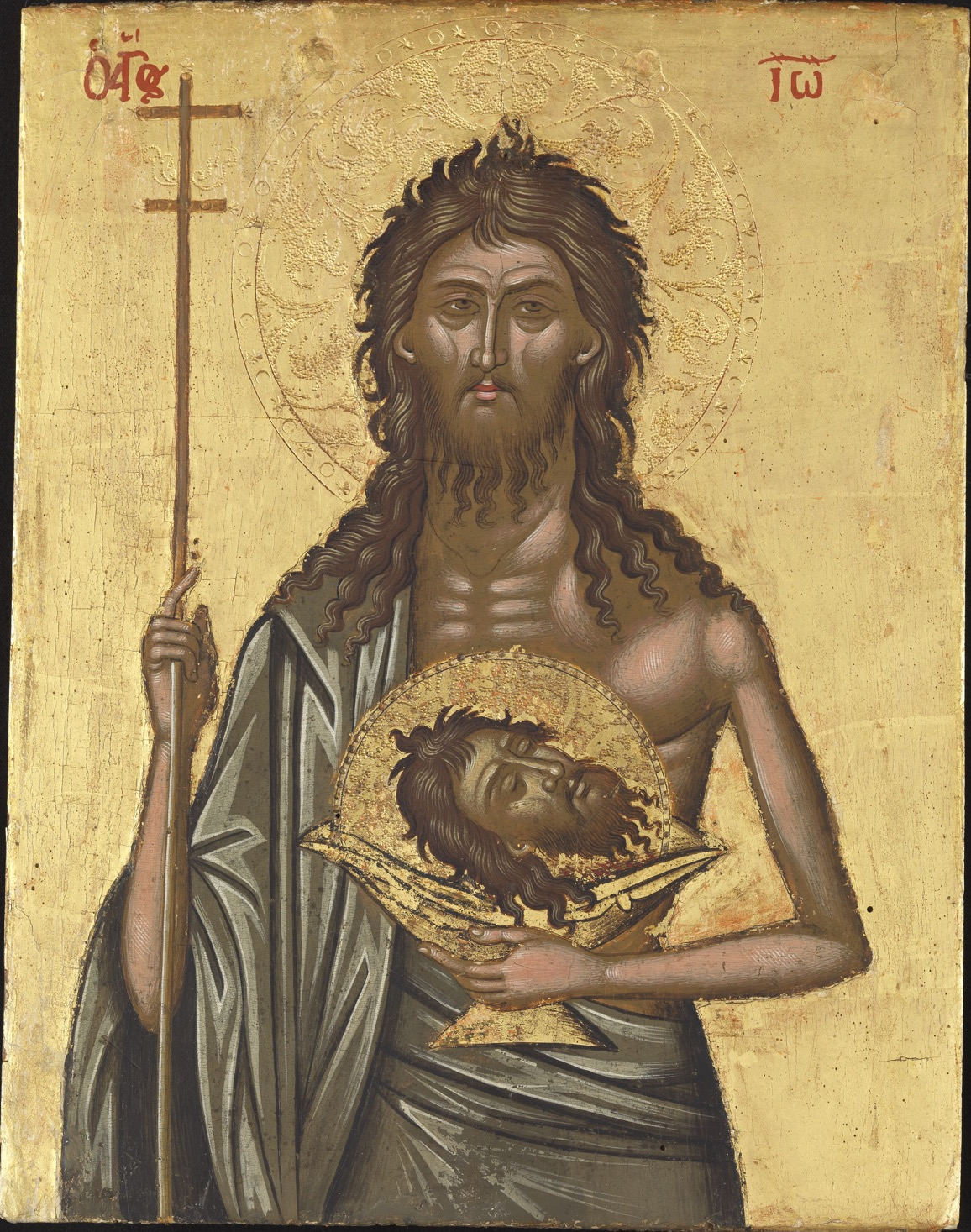
Eastern Orthodox icon of St. John the Baptist by Emmanuel Tzanes, 17th century

The Eastern Orthodox Church considers itself to be both orthodox and catholic. The doctrine of the Catholicity of the Church, as derived from the Nicene Creed, is essential to Eastern Orthodox ecclesiology. The term Catholicity of the Church (Greek: Καθολικότης τῆς Ἐκκλησίας) is used in its original sense, as a designation for the universality of the Christian Church, centred around Christ. Therefore, the Eastern Orthodox notion of catholicity is not centred around any singular see, unlike the Catholic Church which has one earthly centre.

Due to the influence of the Catholic Church in the West, where the English language itself developed, the words "catholic" and "catholicity" are sometimes used to refer to that church specifically. However, the more prominent dictionary sense given for general use is still the one shared by other languages, implying breadth and universality, reflecting comprehensive scope. In a Christian context, the Christian Church, as identified with the original church founded by Christ and his apostles, is said to be catholic (or universal) in regard to its union with Christ in faith.

Just as Christ is indivisible, so are union with him and faith in him, whereby the Christian Church is "universal", unseparated, and comprehensive, including all who share that faith. Orthodox bishop Kallistos Ware has called that "simple Christianity". That is the sense of early and patristic usage wherein the church usually refers to itself as the "Catholic Church", whose faith is the "Orthodox faith". It is also the sense within the phrase "one, holy, catholic, and apostolic Church", found in the Nicene Creed, and referred to in Orthodox worship, e.g. in the litany of the catechumens in the Divine Liturgy.

With the mutual excommunications of the East–West Schism in 1054, the churches in Rome and Constantinople each viewed the other as having departed from the true church, leaving a smaller but still-catholic church in place. Each retained the "Catholic" part of its title, the "Roman Catholic Church" (or Catholic Church) on the one hand, and the "Orthodox Catholic Church" on the other, each of which was defined in terms of inter-communion with either Rome or Constantinople. While the Eastern Orthodox Church recognises what it shares in common with other churches, including the Catholic Church, it sees catholicity in terms of complete union in communion and faith, with the Church throughout all time, and the sharing remains incomplete when not shared fully.

== History ==
=== Early Church ===
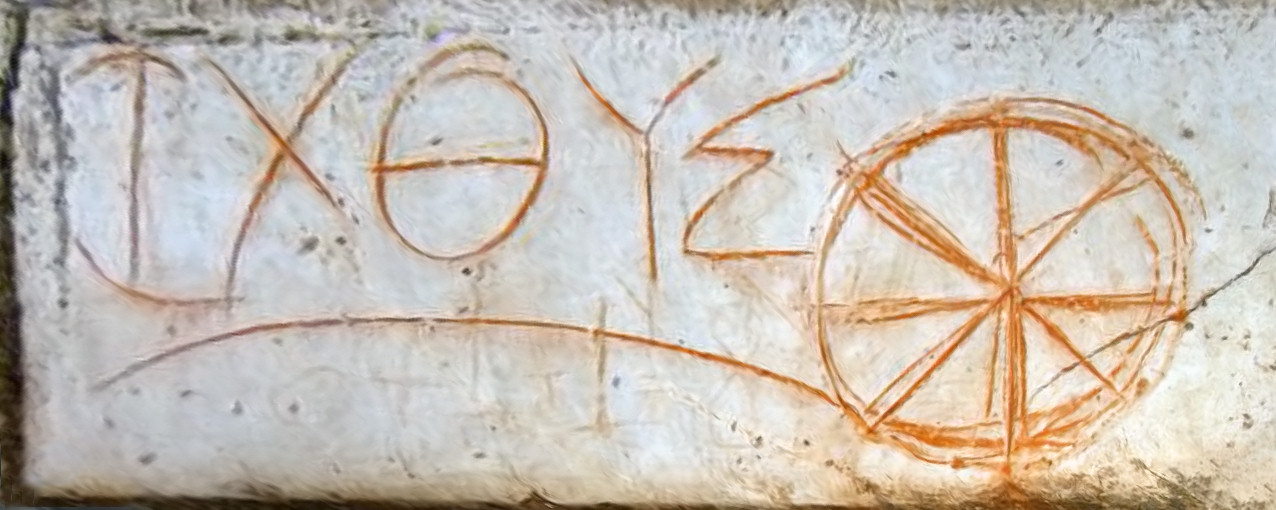
An early Christian "Ichthys" (fish) inscription from ancient Ephesus

Paul and the Apostles travelled extensively throughout the Roman Empire, including Asia Minor, establishing churches in major communities, with the first churches appearing in Jerusalem and the Holy Land, then in Antioch, Ethiopia, Egypt, Rome, Alexandria, Athens, Thessalonica, Illyricum, and Byzantium, which centuries later would become prominent as the New Rome. Christianity encountered considerable resistance in the Roman Empire, mostly because its adherents refused to comply with the demands of the Roman state—often even when their lives were threatened—by offering sacrifices to the pagan gods. Despite persecution, scepticism, and initial social stigma, the Christian Church spread, particularly following the conversion of Emperor Constantine I in AD 312.

By the fourth century, Christianity was present in numerous regions well beyond the Levant. A number of influential schools of thought had arisen, particularly the Alexandrian and Antiochian philosophical approaches. Other groups, such as the Arians, had also managed to gain influence. However, their positions caused theological conflicts within the church, thus prompting the Emperor Constantine to call for a great ecumenical synod to define the church's position against the growing, often widely diverging, philosophical and theological interpretations of Christianity. He made it possible for this council to meet not only by providing a location but also by offering to pay for the transportation of all the existing bishops of the church. Most modern Christian churches regard this synod, commonly called the First Council of Nicaea or more generally the First Ecumenical Council, as of major importance.

=== Ecumenical councils ===
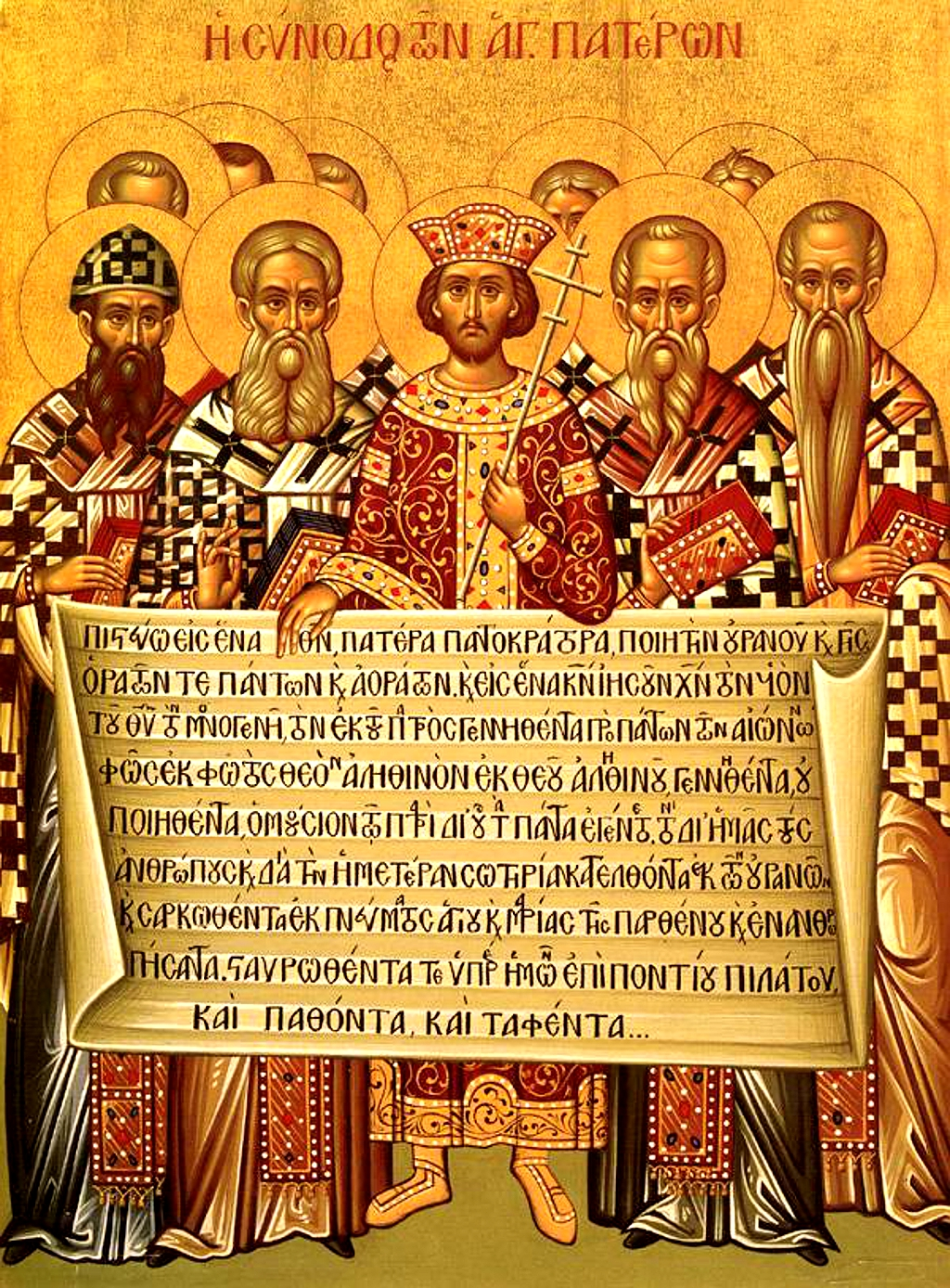
Icon depicting Constantine the Great, accompanied by the bishops of the First Council of Nicaea (325), holding the Niceno-Constantinopolitan Creed of 381. First line of main text in Greek: Πιστεύω εἰς ἕνα Θ[εό]ν, πατέρα παντοκράτορα, ποιητὴν οὐρανοῦ κ[αὶ] γῆς. Translation: "I believe in one God, Father Almighty, Creator of heaven and earth."

Several doctrinal disputes from the fourth century onwards led to the calling of ecumenical councils. In the Orthodox Church, an ecumenical council is the supreme authority that can be invoked to resolve contested issues of the faith. As such, these councils have been held to resolve the most important theological matters that came to be disputed within the Christian Church. Many lesser disagreements were resolved through local councils in the areas where they arose, before they grew significant enough to require an ecumenical council.

There are seven councils authoritatively recognised as ecumenical by the Eastern Orthodox Church:

1. The First Ecumenical Council was convoked by the Roman Emperor Constantine at Nicaea in 325 and presided over by the Patriarch Alexander of Alexandria, with over 300 bishops condemning the view of Arius that the Son is a created being inferior to the Father.
2. The Second Ecumenical Council was held at Constantinople in 381, presided over by the Patriarchs of Alexandria and Antioch, with 150 bishops, defining the nature of the Holy Spirit against those asserting His inequality with the other persons of the Trinity.
3. The Third Ecumenical Council is that of Ephesus in 431, presided over by the Patriarch of Alexandria, with 250 bishops, which affirmed that Mary is truly "Birthgiver" or "Mother" of God (Theotokos), contrary to the teachings of Nestorius.
4. The Fourth Ecumenical Council is that of Chalcedon in 451, Patriarch of Constantinople presiding, 500 bishops, affirmed that Jesus is truly God and truly man, without mixture of the two natures, contrary to Monophysite teaching.
5. The Fifth Ecumenical Council is the second of Constantinople in 553, interpreting the decrees of Chalcedon and further explaining the relationship of the two natures of Jesus; it also condemned the alleged teachings of Origen on the pre-existence of the soul, etc.
6. The Sixth Ecumenical Council is the third of Constantinople in 681; it declared that Christ has two wills of his two natures, human and divine, contrary to the teachings of the Monothelites.
7. The Seventh Ecumenical Council was called under the Empress Regent Irene of Athens in 787, known as the second of Nicaea. It supports the veneration of icons while forbidding their worship. It is often referred to as "The Triumph of Orthodoxy".

There are also two other councils which are considered ecumenical by some Eastern Orthodox:

- The Fourth Council of Constantinople was called in 879. It restored Photius to his See in Constantinople and condemned any alteration of the Nicene-Constantinopolitan Creed of 381.
- The Fifth Council of Constantinople was actually a series of councils held between 1341 and 1368. It affirmed the hesychastic theology of Gregory Palamas and condemned the philosopher Barlaam of Calabria.

=== Other major councils ===
In addition to these councils, there have been a number of other significant councils meant to further define the Eastern Orthodox position. They are the Synods of Constantinople, in 1484, 1583, 1755, 1819, and 1872, the Synod of Iași in 1642, and the Pan-Orthodox Synod of Jerusalem in 1672. Another council convened in June 2016 to discuss many modern phenomena, other Christian confessions, Eastern Orthodoxy's relation with other religions and fasting disciplines.

=== Roman and Byzantine Empire ===
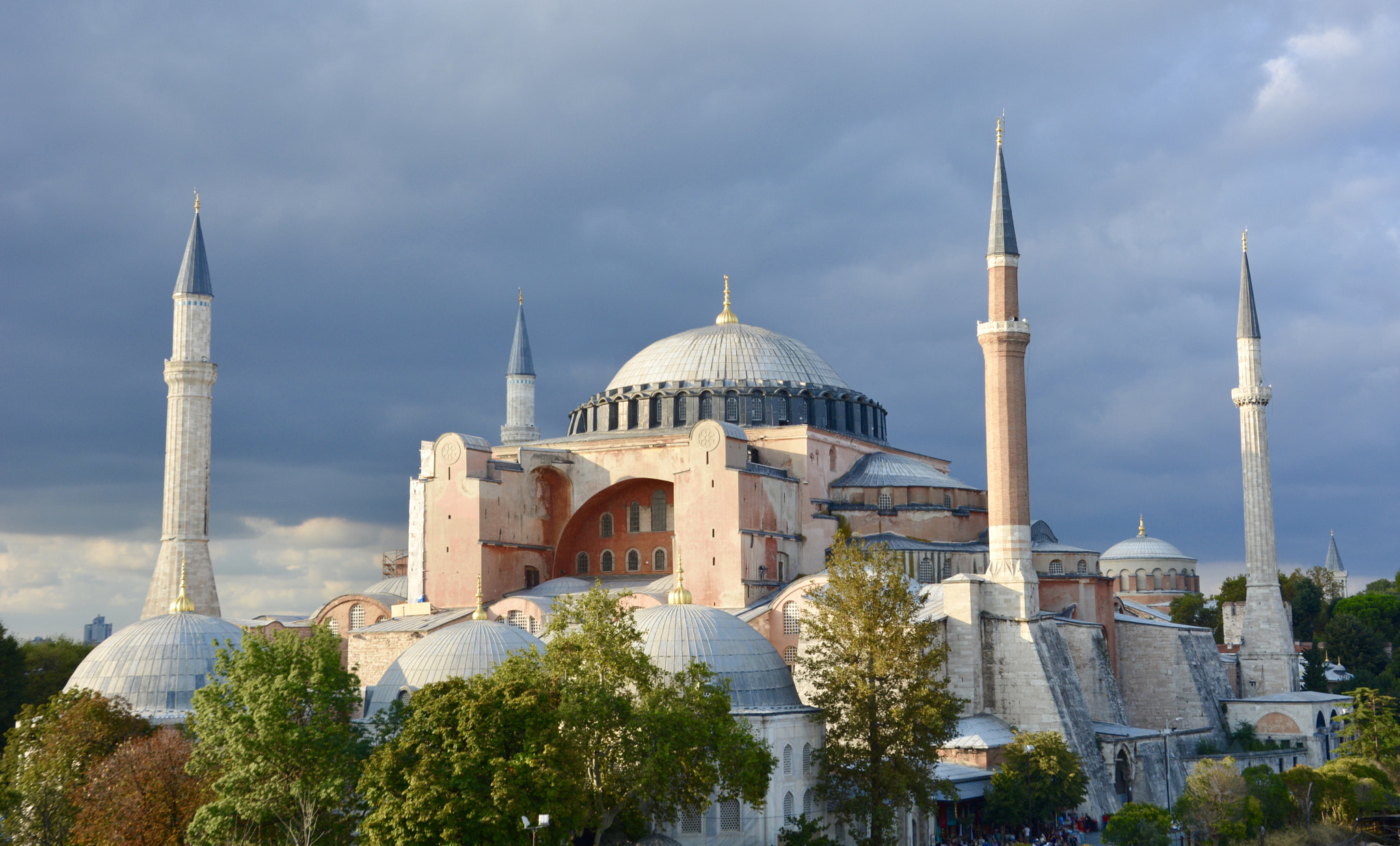
The Hagia Sophia, the largest church in the world and patriarchal basilica of Constantinople for nearly a thousand years, later converted into a mosque, then a museum, then back to a mosque

Constantinople is generally considered to be the centre and the "cradle of Orthodox Christian civilisation". From the mid-5th century to the early 13th century, Constantinople was the largest and wealthiest city in Europe. Eastern Christian culture reached its golden age during the high point of the Byzantine Empire and continued to flourish in Ukraine and Russia, after the fall of Constantinople. Numerous autocephalous churches were established in Europe: Greece, Georgia, Ukraine, as well as in Russia and Asia.

In the 530s the Church of the Holy Wisdom (Hagia Sophia) was built in Constantinople under Emperor Justinian I. Beginning with subsequent Byzantine architecture, Hagia Sophia became the paradigmatic Orthodox church form and its architectural style was emulated by Ottoman mosques a thousand years later. Being the episcopal see of the ecumenical patriarch of Constantinople, it remained the world's largest cathedral for nearly a thousand years, until Seville Cathedral was completed in 1520. Hagia Sophia has been described as "holding a unique position in the Christian world", and architectural and cultural icon of Byzantine and Eastern Orthodox civilisation, and it is considered the epitome of Byzantine architecture and is said to have "changed the history of architecture".

=== Early schisms ===
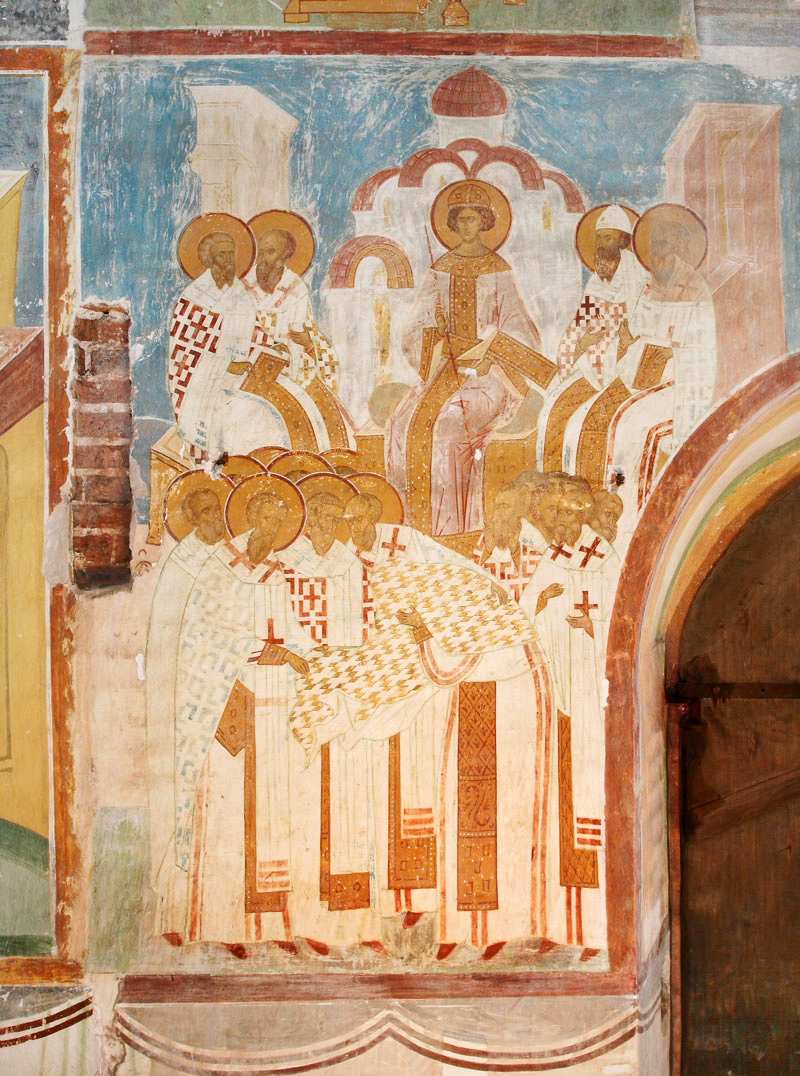
15th-century mural from Ferapontov Monastery depicting the deposition of Nestorius at the Council of Ephesus (431).

There are the "Nestorian" churches resulted from the reaction of the Council of Ephesus (431), which are the earliest surviving Eastern Christian churches that keep the faith of only the first two ecumenical councils, i.e., the First Council of Nicaea (325) and the First Council of Constantinople (381) as legitimate. "Nestorian" is an outsider's term for a tradition that predated the influence of Nestorius, the origin of which might lie in certain sections of the School of Antioch or via Nestorius' teachers Theodore of Mopsuestia or Diodore of Tarsus. The modern incarnation of the "Nestorian Church" is commonly referred to as "the Assyrian Church" or fully as the Assyrian Church of the East.

The church in Egypt (Patriarchate of Alexandria) split into two groups following the Council of Chalcedon (451), over a dispute about the relation between the divine and human natures of Jesus. Eventually this led to each group anathematising the other. Those that remained in communion with the other patriarchs (by accepting the Council of Chalcedon) are known today as the Greek Orthodox Church of Alexandria, where the adjective "Greek" refers to their ties to the Greek-speaking culture of the Byzantine Empire.

Those who disagreed with the findings of the Council of Chalcedon were the majority in Egypt. Today, they are known as the Coptic Orthodox Church, having maintained a separate patriarchate. The Coptic Orthodox Church is currently the largest Christian church in Egypt and the entire Middle East. Likewise, in the Levant and Mesopotamia, another schism occurred to the Patriarchate of Antioch, resulting in the establishment of two parallel patriarchates which endure today: the Syriac Orthodox Church of Antioch and the Greek Orthodox Church of Antioch.

Those who disagreed with the Council of Chalcedon are called Oriental Orthodox to distinguish them from the Eastern Orthodox, who accepted the Council of Chalcedon. Oriental Orthodox are also sometimes referred to as "non-Chalcedonians" or "anti-Chalcedonians". The Oriental Orthodox Churches denies that they are monophysite and prefers the term miaphysite, to denote the "united" nature of Jesus (two natures united into one composite nature) consistent with Cyril's theology: "The term union ... signifies the concurrence in one reality of those things which are understood to be united" and "the Word who is ineffably united with it in a manner beyond all description" (Cyril of Alexandria, On the Unity of Christ). This is also defined in the Coptic liturgy, where it is mentioned "He made it [his humanity] one with his divinity without mingling, without confusion and without alteration", and "His divinity parted not from his humanity for a single moment nor a twinkling of an eye." They do not accept the teachings of Eutyches, or Eutychianism. Both the Eastern Orthodox and Oriental Orthodox churches formally believe themselves to be the continuation of the true church.

=== Conversion of the South and East Slavs ===
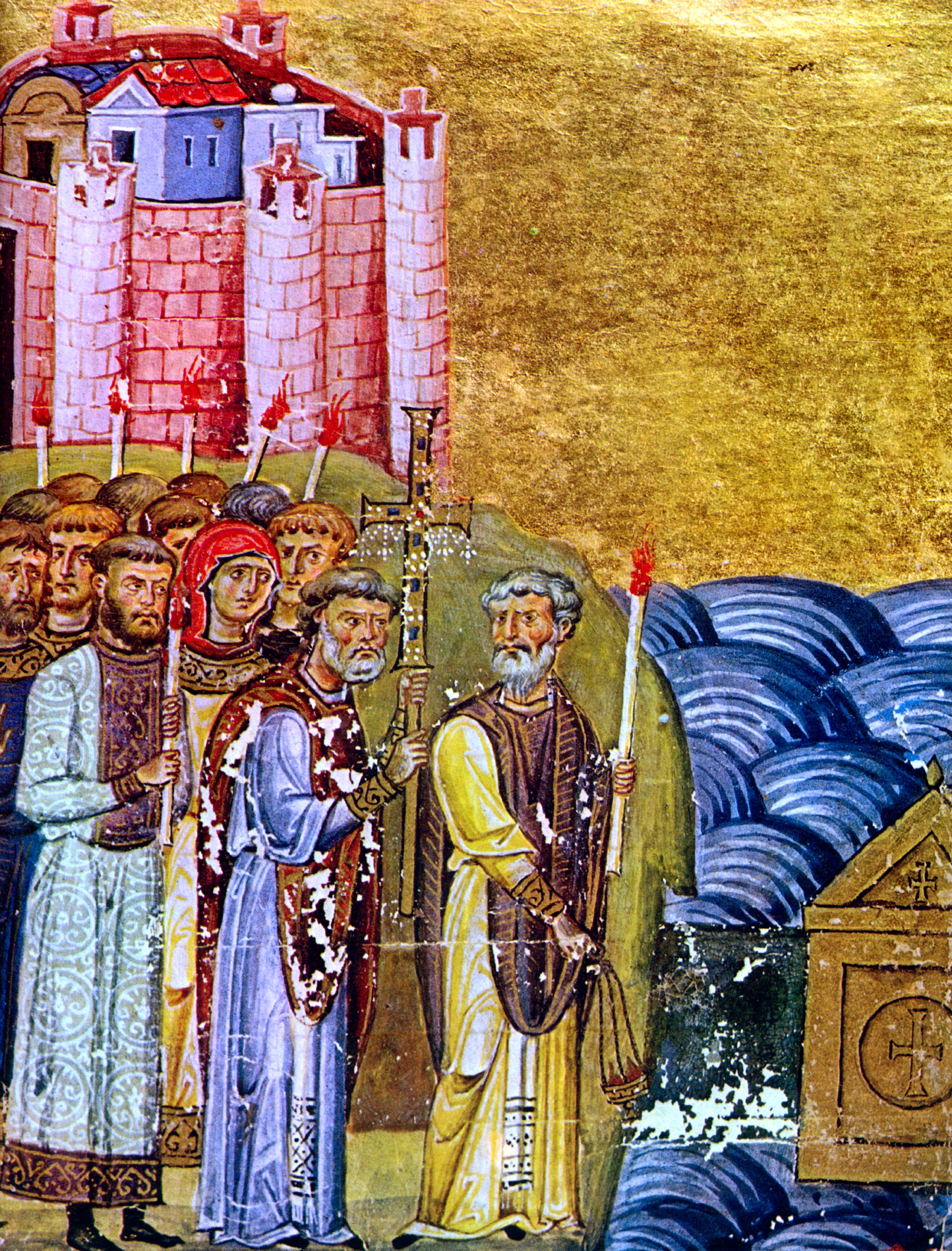
Miniature of Saints Cyril and Methodius, missionaries to the Slavs, from the Menologion of Basil II, c. 11th century

In the ninth and tenth centuries, Christianity made great inroads into pagan Europe, including Bulgaria (864) and later Kievan Rus' (988). This work was made possible by Cyril and Methodius of Thessaloniki, two brothers chosen by Byzantine emperor Michael III to fulfil the request of Rastislav of Moravia for teachers who could minister to the Moravians in their own language. Cyril and Methodius began translating the divine liturgy, other liturgical texts, and the Gospels along with some other scriptural texts into local languages; with time, as these translations were copied by speakers of other dialects, the hybrid literary language Church Slavonic was created. Originally sent to convert the Slavs of Great Moravia, Cyril and Methodius were forced to compete with Frankish missionaries from the Roman diocese; their disciples were driven out of Great Moravia in AD 886 and emigrated to Bulgaria.

After the Christianisation of Bulgaria in 864, the disciples of Cyril and Methodius in Bulgaria, the most important being Clement of Ohrid and Naum of Preslav, were of great importance to the Orthodox faith in the First Bulgarian Empire. In a short time they managed to prepare and instruct the future Bulgarian clergy into the biblical texts and in AD 870 the Fourth Council of Constantinople granted the Bulgarians the oldest organised autocephalous Slavic Orthodox Church, which shortly thereafter became Patriarchate. The success of the conversion of the Bulgarians facilitated the conversion of the East Slavs. A major event in this effort was the development of the Cyrillic script in Bulgaria, at the Preslav Literary School in the ninth century; this script, along with the liturgical Old Church Slavonic, also called Old Bulgarian, was declared official in Bulgaria in 893.

The work of Cyril and Methodius and their disciples had a major impact on the Serbs as well. They accepted Christianity collectively along familial and tribal lines, a gradual process that occurred between the seventh and ninth centuries. In commemoration of their baptisms, each Serbian family or tribe began to celebrate an exclusively Serbian custom called Slava (patron saint) in a special way to honour the saint on whose day they received the sacrament of baptism. It is the most solemn day of the year for all Serbs of the Orthodox faith and has played a role of vital importance in the history of the Serbian people. Slava remains a celebration of the conversion of the Serbian people, which the church blessed and proclaimed a church institution.

The missionaries to the East and South Slavs had great success in part because they used the people's native language rather than Greek, the predominant language of the Byzantine Empire, or Latin, as the Roman priests did. Perhaps the greatest legacy of their efforts is the Russian Orthodox Church, which is the largest of the Orthodox churches.

=== Great Schism (1054) ===
In the 11th century, what was recognised as the Great Schism took place between Rome and Constantinople, which led to separation between the Church of the West, the Catholic Church, and the Eastern Byzantine churches, now the Orthodox. There were doctrinal issues like the filioque clause and the authority of the Pope involved in the split, but these were greatly exacerbated by political factors of both Church and state, and by cultural and linguistic differences between Latins and Greeks. Regarding papal supremacy, the Eastern half grew disillusioned with the Pope's centralisation of power, as well as his blatant attempts of excluding the Eastern half in regard to papal approvals. It had previously been the case that the emperor would have a say when a new Pope was elected, but towards the high Middle Ages, the Christians in Rome were slowly consolidating power and removing Byzantine influence. However, even before this exclusionary tendency from the West, well before 1054, the Eastern and Western halves of the Church were in perpetual conflict, particularly during the periods of Eastern iconoclasm and the Photian schism.

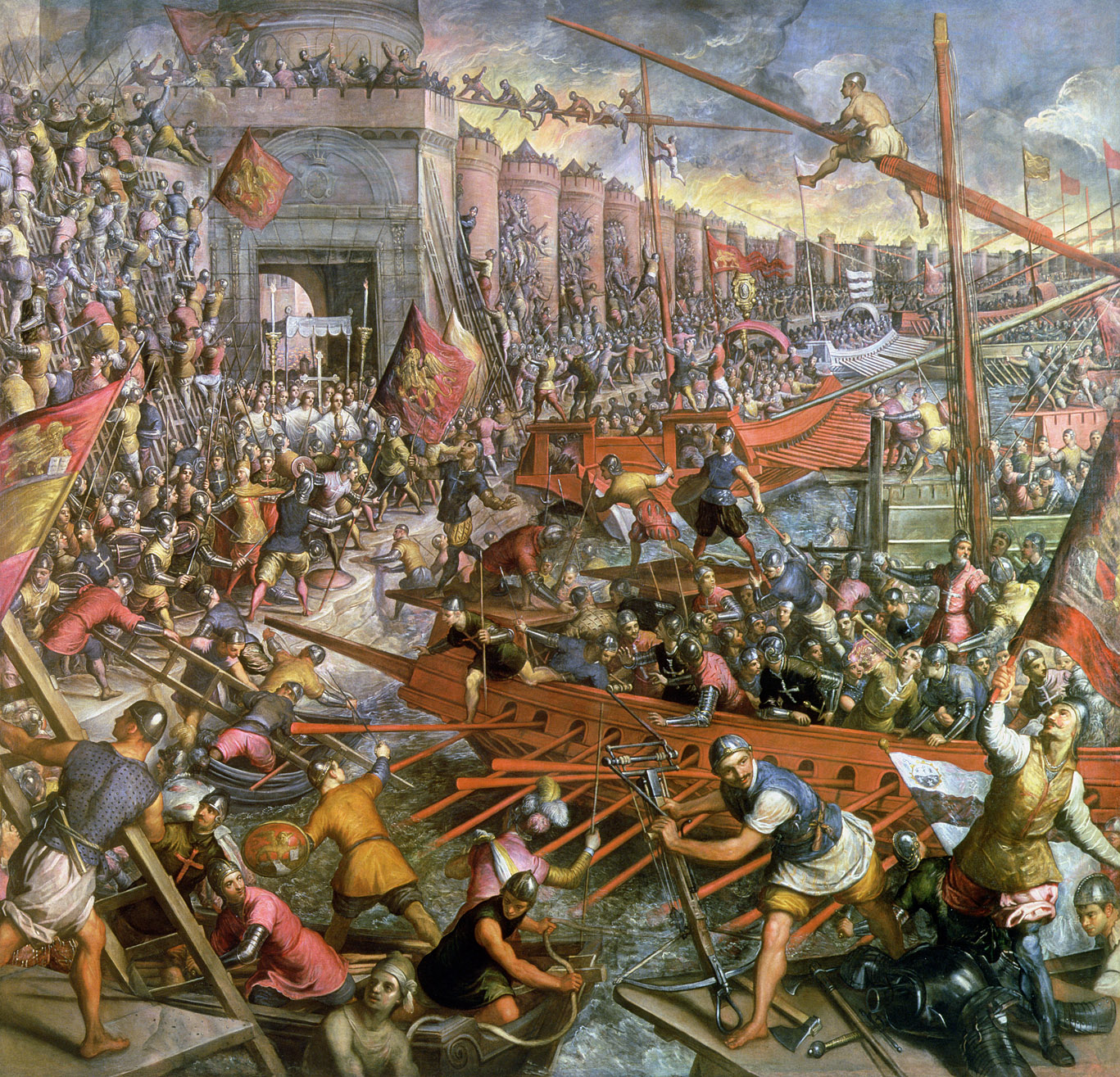
Latin Crusaders sacking the city of Constantinople, the capital of the Eastern Orthodox–controlled Byzantine Empire, in 1204

The final breach is often considered to have arisen after the capture and sacking of Constantinople by the Fourth Crusade in 1204; the final break with Rome occurred circa 1450. The sacking of Church of Holy Wisdom and establishment of the Latin Empire as a seeming attempt to supplant the Orthodox Byzantine Empire in 1204 is viewed with some rancour to the present day. In 2004, Pope John Paul II extended a formal apology for the sacking of Constantinople in 1204, which had also been strongly condemned by the Pope at the time, Innocent III; the apology was formally accepted by Patriarch Bartholomew of Constantinople. However, many items stolen during this time, such as holy relics and riches, are still held in various European cities, particularly Venice.

Reunion was attempted twice, at the 1274 Second Council of Lyon and the 1439 Council of Florence. The Council of Florence briefly reestablished communion between East and West, which lasted until after the fall of Constantinople in 1453. In each case, however, the councils were rejected by the Orthodox people as a whole, and the union of Florence also became very politically difficult after Constantinople came under Ottoman rule. However, in the time since, several local Orthodox Christian churches have renewed union with Rome, known as the Eastern Catholic Churches. Recent decades have seen a renewal of ecumenical spirit and dialogue between the Catholic and Orthodox churches.

=== Greek Church under Ottoman rule ===
The Byzantine Empire never fully recovered from the sack of Constantinople in 1204. Over the next two centuries, it entered a precipitous decline in both territory and influence. In 1453, a much-diminished Byzantine Empire fell to the Ottoman Empire, ending what was once the most powerful state in the Orthodox Christian world, if not in all Christendom. By this time Egypt, another major centre of Eastern Christianity, had been under Muslim control for some seven centuries; most Eastern Orthodox communities across southeastern Europe gradually came under Ottoman rule by the 16th century.

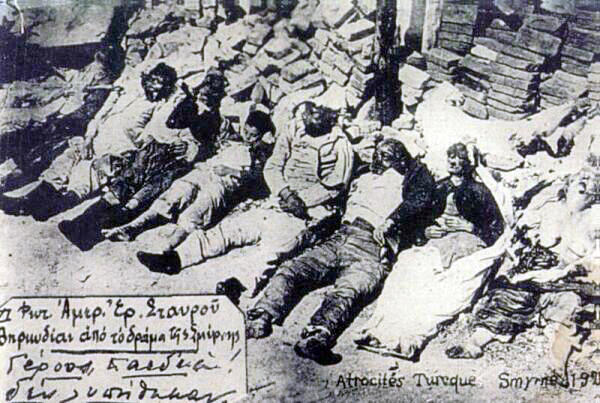
Greek Orthodox massacred during the Greek genocide in Smyrna in 1922

Under the Ottomans, the Greek Orthodox Church acquired substantial power as an autonomous millet. The ecumenical patriarch was the religious and administrative ruler of the Rûm, an Ottoman administrative unit meaning "Roman", which encompassed all Orthodox subjects of the Empire regardless of ethnicity. While legally subordinate to Muslims and subject to various restrictions, the Orthodox community was generally tolerated until the rise of nationalist movements in the late 19th and early 20th centuries, and left to govern its own internal affairs, both religiously and legally. Until the empire's dissolution in the early 20th century, Orthodox Christians would remain the largest non-Muslim minority, and at times among the wealthiest and most politically influential.

During the period 1914–1923 in Asia Minor (Anatolia) the Greek genocide took place by the Ottomans. During the Greek genocide, many Orthodox Christians were persecuted and killed. The culmination of the martyrdom was the Asia Minor Catastrophe with the killing of a large number of Orthodox. Among them, 347 clergymen of the Smyrna region and Metropolitan of Smyrna Chrysostomos were tortured and killed. The period 1923–1924 was followed by the obligatory population exchange between Greece and Turkey.

=== Russian Orthodox Church in the Russian Empire ===
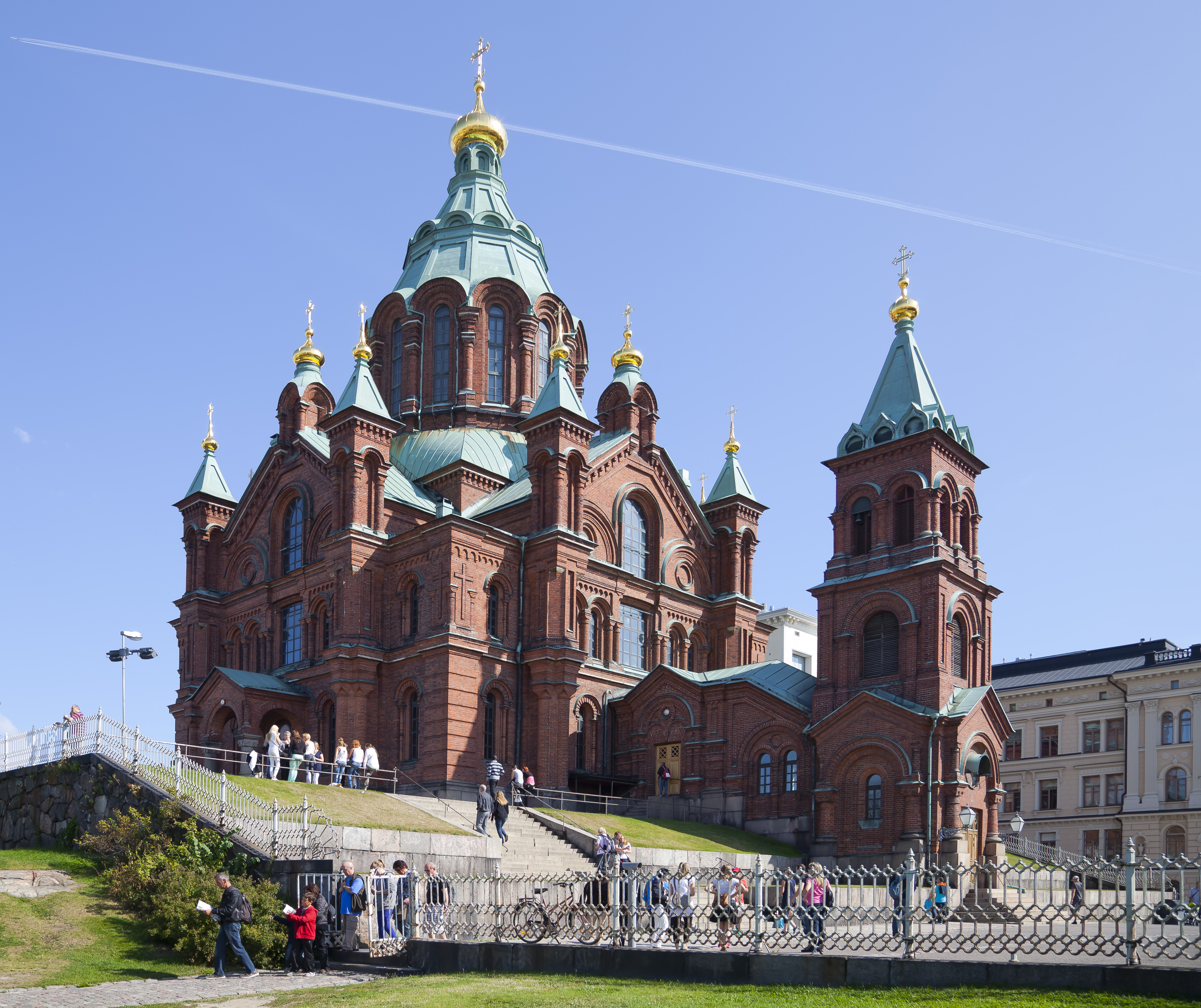
Uspenski Cathedral, a main cathedral of the Finnish Orthodox Church in Helsinki, Finland, was built under Imperial Russia.

By the time most Orthodox communities came under Muslim rule in the mid-15th century, Orthodoxy was very strong in Russia, which had maintained close cultural and political ties with the Byzantine Empire; roughly two decades after the fall of Constantinople, Ivan III of Russia married Sophia Palaiologina, a niece of the last Byzantine Emperor Constantine XI, and styled himself Tsar ("Caesar") or imperator. In 1547, his grandson Ivan IV, a devout Orthodox Christian, cemented the title as "Tsar of All Rus", establishing Russia's first centralised state with divinely appointed rulers. In 1589, the Patriarchate of Constantinople granted autocephalous status to Moscow, the capital of what was now the largest Orthodox Christian polity; the city thereafter referred to itself as the Third Rome—the cultural and religious heir of Constantinople.

Until 1666, when Patriarch Nikon was deposed by the tsar, the Russian Orthodox Church had been independent of the State. In 1721, the first Russian Emperor, Peter I, abolished completely the patriarchate and effectively made the church a department of the government, ruled by a most holy synod composed of senior bishops and lay bureaucrats appointed by the Emperor himself. Over time, Imperial Russia would style itself a protector and patron of all Orthodox Christians, especially those within the Ottoman Empire.

For nearly 200 years, until the Bolsheviks' October Revolution of 1917, the Russian Orthodox Church remained, in effect, a governmental agency and an instrument of tsarist rule. It was used to varying degrees in imperial campaigns of Russification, and was even allowed to levy taxes on peasants. The church's close ties with the state came to a head under Nicholas I (1825–1855), who explicitly made Orthodoxy a core doctrine of imperial unity and legitimacy. The Orthodox faith became further tied to Russian identity and nationalism, while the church was further subordinated to the interests of the state. Consequently, Russian Orthodox Church, along with the imperial regime to which it belonged, came to be presented as an enemy of the people by the Bolsheviks and other Russian revolutionaries.

=== Eastern Orthodox churches under Communist rule ===
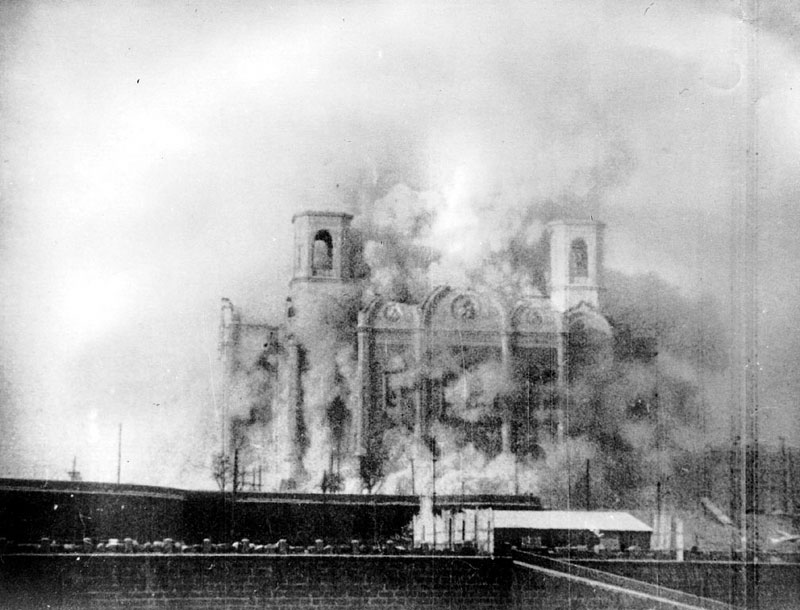
1931 demolition of the Cathedral of Christ the Saviour in Moscow

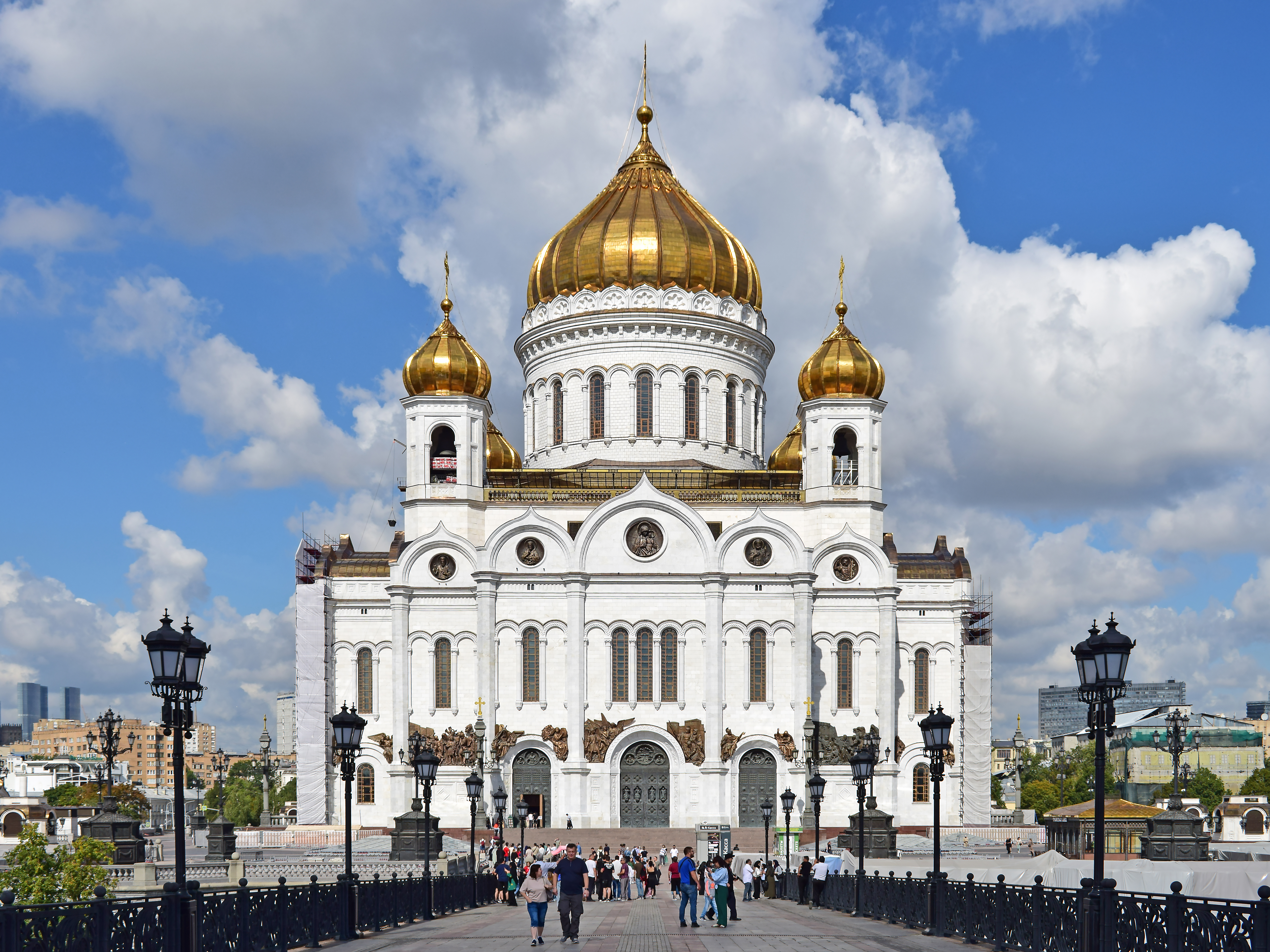
The rebuilt Cathedral of Christ the Saviour, currently the third-tallest Orthodox church

After the October Revolution of 1917, part of the clergy of the Russian Orthodox Church fled abroad to escape Bolshevik persecutions, founding an independent church in exile, which reunified with its Russian counterpart in 2007. Others formed the present-day Orthodox Church in America, and the American Orthodox Catholic Church (the latter whose bishops were considered episcopi vagantes, yet also accepted back into mainstream Orthodoxy). Some actions against Orthodox priests and believers along with execution included torture, being sent to prison camps, labour camps or mental hospitals. In the first five years after the Bolshevik revolution, 28 bishops and 1,200 priests were executed.

After Nazi Germany's attack on the Soviet Union in 1941, Joseph Stalin revived the Russian Orthodox Church to intensify patriotic support for the war effort. By 1957 about 22,000 Russian Orthodox churches had become active. However, in 1959, Nikita Khrushchev initiated his own campaign against the Russian Orthodox Church and forced the closure of about 12,000 churches. It is estimated that 50,000 clergy had been executed between the revolution and the end of the Khrushchev era. Members of the church hierarchy were jailed or forced out, their places taken by docile clergy, many of whom had ties with the KGB. By 1985 fewer than 7,000 churches remained active.

Albania was the only state to have declared itself officially fully atheist. In some other Communist states such as Romania, the Romanian Orthodox Church as an organisation enjoyed relative freedom and even prospered, albeit under strict secret police control. That, however, did not rule out demolishing churches and monasteries as part of broader systematisation (urban planning), and state persecution of individual believers. As an example of the latter, Romania stands out as a country which ran a specialised institution where many Orthodox (along with people of other faiths) were subjected to psychological punishment or torture and mind control experimentation in order to force them give up their religious convictions. However, this was only supported by one faction within the regime, and lasted only three years. The Communist authorities closed down the prison in 1952, and punished many of those responsible for abuses (twenty of them were sentenced to death).

=== Post-communism to 21st century ===
Since the dissolution of the Soviet Union, and the subsequent Fall of Communist governments across the Orthodox world, there has been marked growth in Christian Orthodoxy, particularly in Russia. According to the Pew Research Religion & Public Life Project, between 1991 and 2008, the share of Russian adults identifying as Orthodox Christian rose from 31 per cent to 72 per cent, based on analysis of three waves of data (1991, 1998 and 2008) from the International Social Survey Programme (ISSP), a collaborative effort involving social scientists in about 50 countries.

Pew research conducted in 2017 found a doubling in the global Orthodox population since the early 20th century, with the greatest resurgence in Russia. In the former Soviet Union—where the largest Orthodox communities live—self-identified Orthodox Christians generally report low levels of observance and piety: In Russia, only 6% of Orthodox Christian adults reported attending church at least weekly, 15% say religion is "very important" in their lives, and 18% say they pray daily; other former Soviet republics display similarly low levels of religious observance.

==== Moscow–Constantinople schisms ====
===== 1996 =====
Since 1923, the Orthodox Church of Estonia separated from the Russian Orthodox Church due to the imprisonment of Patriarch Tikhon of Moscow, and the church in the Republic of Estonia falling out of communication with the Russian Church. They petitioned to be placed under direct control of the Ecumenical Patriarch of Constantinople, operating as an autonomous church. In 1944 the Soviet Union annexed Estonia and outlawed the Orthodox Church of Estonia, forcefully bringing their churches back under the control of the Moscow Patriarch. However, the church's Primate, Metropolitan Aleksander, fled to Sweden with 21 clergymen and 8,000 followers and established a synod there operating there throughout the Cold War.

In 1993, the synod of the Orthodox Church of Estonia in Exile was re-registered and on 20 February 1996, Bartholomew I of Constantinople restored the church's position as subordinate to Constantinople, not Moscow. Patriarch Alexy II of Moscow, who had been born in Estonia, rejected this loss of territory, and severed ties with Patriarch Bartholomew on February 23, removing his name from the diptychs. The two sides would then negotiate in Zürich, and a settlement was reached on 16 May 1996. In it, the ethnically Estonian population of Estonia would be under the jurisdiction of the Estonian Apostolic Orthodox Church, while the ethnically Russian population of Estonia would be under the jurisdiction of the Estonian Orthodox Church of the Moscow Patriarchate. After signing the document the Russian Church restored communion with the Ecumenical Patriarchate.

===== 2018 =====
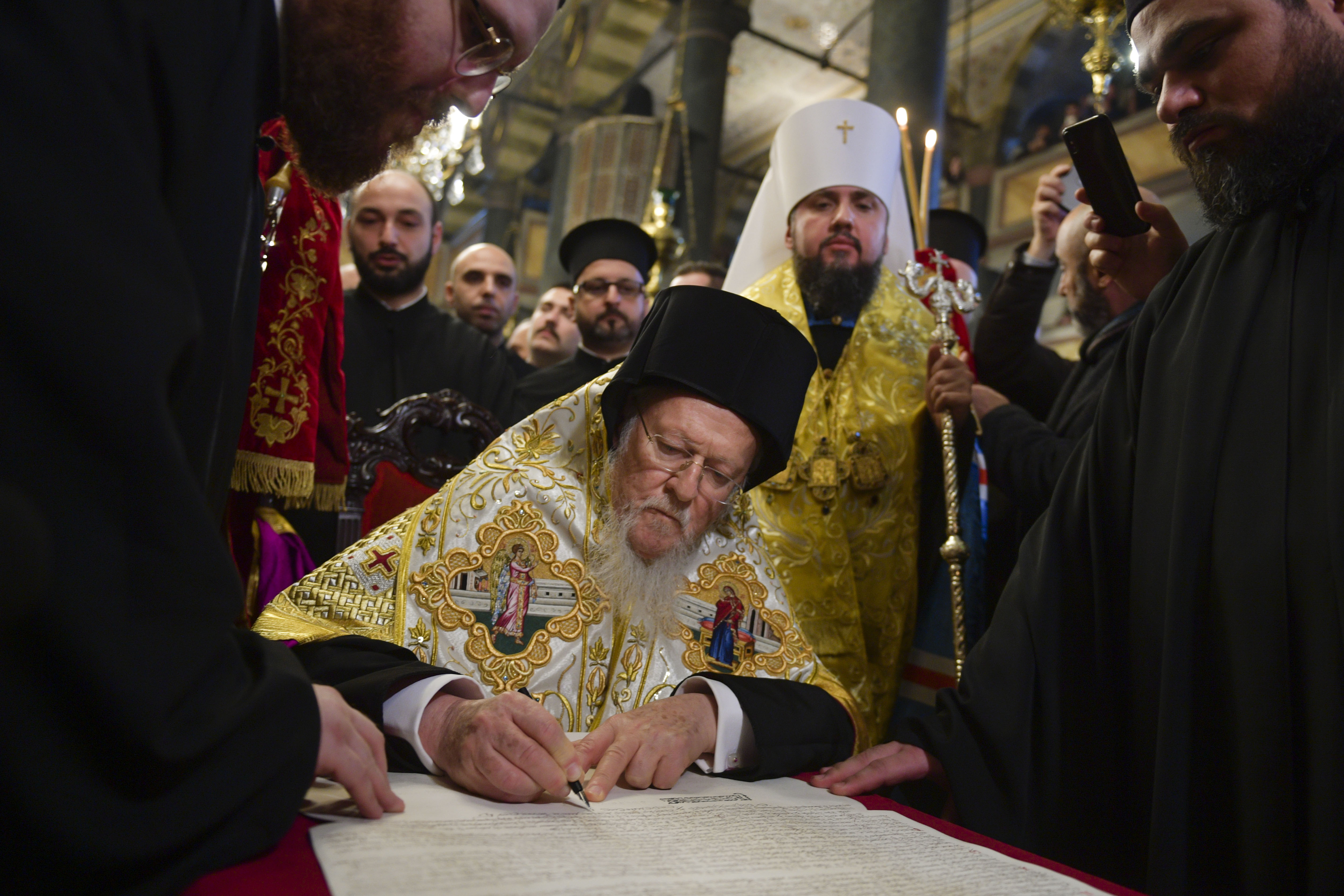
Patriarch Bartholomew signing the tomos of the autocephaly of the OCU

Since the Baptism of Rus' (Note: Rus' is a region inhabited by East Slavs who were once ruled by princes from the Rurik dynasty. This term refers to the Middle Ages, in contrast to the more recent (15th century) term "Russia". See also: Names of Rus', Russia and Ruthenia.) in 867 the Orthodox church in Ukraine was led by the Metropolitan of Kiev and all Rus' who was subordinate to the Ecumenical Patriarch of Constantinople and was largely governed by the Polish–Lithuanian Commonwealth since the territory was conquered in the Galicia–Volhynia Wars, ending in 1392. Poland-Lithuania lost the territory to Russia as part of the peace deal of the Great Northern War in 1654. In 1686 Dionysius IV of Constantinople transferred the territory to the Patriarch of Moscow and all Rus'. In 1924, Orthodox churches in Ukraine besides the Metropolitan of Kyiv were placed under the jurisdiction of the Polish Orthodox Church by the Ecumenical Patriarch as an autonomous church, however, the Russian Church never agreed to nor recognised this transfer, mostly due to Patriarch Tikhon of Moscow and most of the Russian Church's leaders being imprisoned by Soviet officials. The Soviet Union, initially, had a policy of repression against the Orthodox Church, regardless of its denomination. However, after the start of the Nazi Invasion of the Soviet Union, Joseph Stalin transformed the Russian Church into a propaganda tool to intensify patriotic support for the war effort. Following Soviet victory in the war, various autonomous and Independent Orthodox churches around eastern Europe were forcefully integrated or reintegrated into the Russian Church, including the church in Ukraine. Many of the church's leaders at this time were installed and closely monitored by the NKVD to ensure the church's support for the Soviet Union.

This situation led to the rise of rival, anti-Russian and anti-Soviet churches within Ukraine, including the Ukrainian Autocephalous Orthodox Church (UAOC), founded in 1917 which declared itself the restored autonomous church that existed prior to 1686 but had been eradicated within Soviet Ukraine by the 1930s. The church was largely supported by Ukrainian émigrés and diaspora, and was restored as a legally recognised church by the Ukrainian government in 1991. In 1992, the Ukrainian Orthodox Church – Kyiv Patriarchate (UOC-KP) came into existence, being founded by members of the Russian Church defrocked for insubordination, alongside support with the Ukrainian émigré community. The church submitted a request for Ukrainian autocephaly at its founding synod in Kyiv in 1992. These churches were competing with the Ukrainian Orthodox Church (UOC-MP), the Russian Church in Ukraine.

On 11 October 2018, the Holy Synod of the Ecumenical Patriarchate of Constantinople revoked the Russian Church's letter of issue, allowing them to ordain the Metropolitan of Kyiv, re-established a stauropegion in Kyiv, and lifted the Russian Church's excommunication of members of the UAOC and the UOC-KP. In response, on 15 October, the Holy Synod of the Russian Orthodox Church severed all ties with the Ecumenical Patriarchate of Constantinople and barred all members of the Russian Church from receiving communion or sacraments from any churches with ties to the Ecumenical Patriarchate. On 15 December 2018, the UAOC and UOC-KP voted to merge in the Unification council of the Eastern Orthodox churches of Ukraine, forming the restored Orthodox Church of Ukraine, with Epiphanius of Kyiv, of the UOC-KP, becoming the first primate of the unified church. On 5 January 2019, Bartholomew I signed the official tomos that granted autocephaly to the Orthodox Church of Ukraine.

In addition to severing ties with the Ecumenical Patriarchate, the Russian Church has also severed communion with Archbishop Ieronymos II of Athens primate of the Church of Greece, Patriarch Theodore II of Alexandria, and Archbishop Chrysostomos II of Cyprus. In response to the severing of ties with the Ecumenical Patriarchate, the Archdiocese of Russian Orthodox Churches in Western Europe (AROCWE), voted to dissolve itself, although the vote failed, it resulted in a split in AROCWE, with several churches leaving to form the "Vicariate of Russian Tradition of the Metropolis of France", while John (Renneteau), head of the AROCWE, personally joined the Russian Church. After the 2022 Russian invasion of Ukraine, the UOC-MP severed all ties with the Russian Church.

== Organisation and leadership ==
A timeline showing the main autocephalous Eastern Orthodox churches, from an Eastern Orthodox point of view, up to 2022

The canonical territories of the main autocephalous and autonomous Eastern Orthodox jurisdictions as of 2022

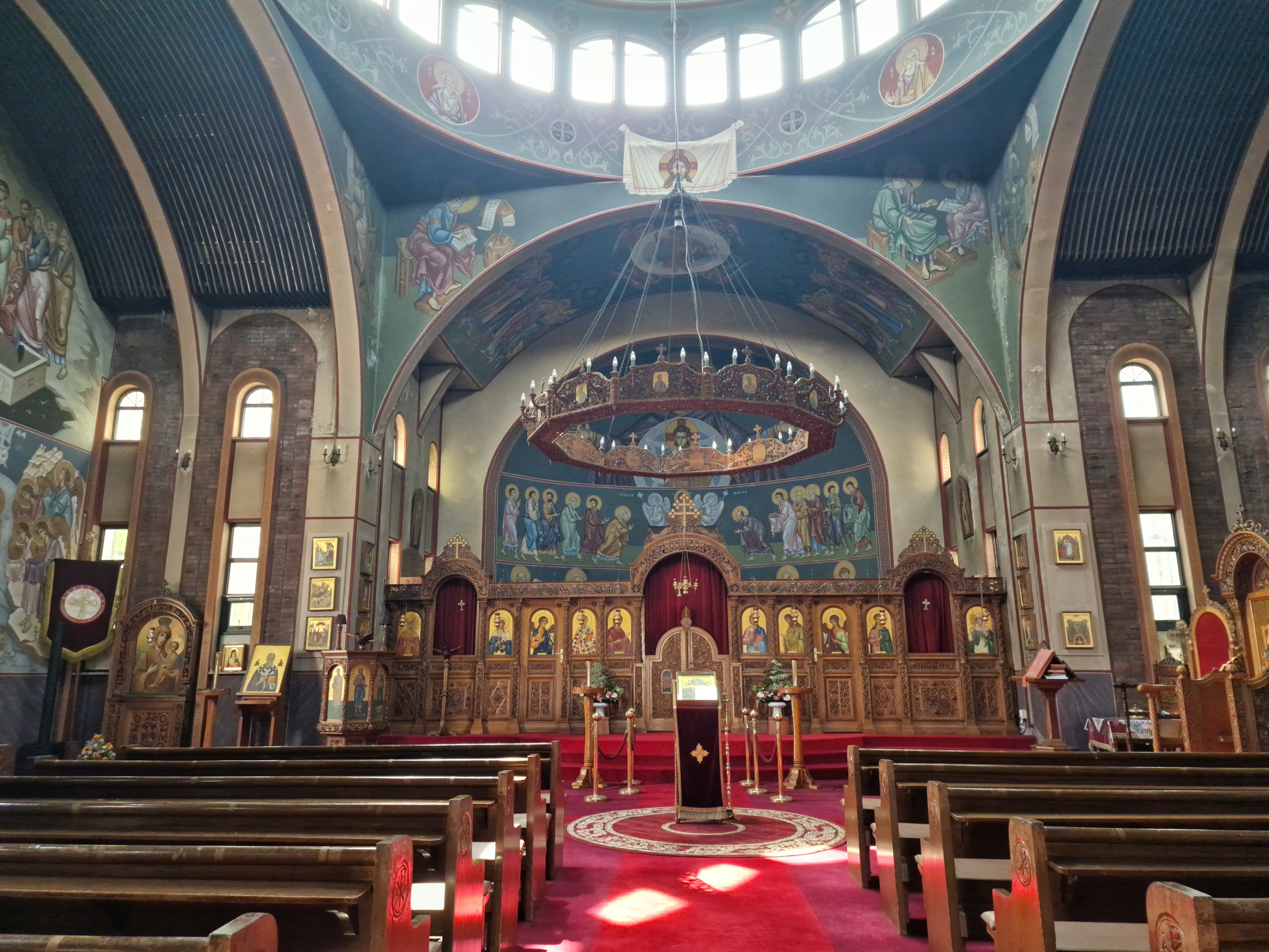
St. Nicholas Cathedral in Seoul, Korea

The Eastern Orthodox Church is a fellowship of autocephalous (Ancient Greek: αὐτοκέφαλος; "self-headed") churches, with the ecumenical patriarch of Constantinople recognised as having primus inter pares status. The patriarch of Constantinople has the honour of primacy, but his title is only first among equals and he has no real authority over churches other than the Constantinopolitan church. Rather, his role is limited to defined prerogatives interpreted by the ecumenical patriarch. At times, though, the office of the ecumenical patriarch has been accused of Constantinopolitan or Eastern papism.

The Eastern Orthodox Church considers Jesus Christ to be the head of the Church and the Church to be his body. It is believed that Church authority and the grace of God is directly passed down to Orthodox bishops and other clergy through the laying on of hands—a practice started by the New Testament apostles—and that this unbroken historical link is an essential element of the true church (Acts 8:17; 1 Timothy 4:14; Hebrews 6:2) The Eastern Orthodox Church asserts that apostolic succession requires apostolic faith, and bishops without apostolic faith, who are in heresy, forfeit their claim to apostolic succession.

The Eastern Orthodox communion is organised into several regional churches, which are either autocephalous or lower-ranking autonomous ("self-governing") church bodies unified in theology and worship. These include the fourteen autocephalous churches of the Constantinople, Alexandria, Antioch, Jerusalem, Georgia, Cyprus, Bulgaria, Serbia, Russia, Greece, Poland, Romania, Albania, and the Czech Republic and Slovakia, which were officially invited to the Pan-Orthodox Council of 2016; the Orthodox Church in America formed in 1970; the autocephalous Orthodox Church of Ukraine created in 2019; the Macedonian Orthodox Church – Ohrid Archbishopric, granted autocephaly by the Serbian Orthodox Church in 2022; and a number of autonomous churches. Each church has a ruling bishop and a holy synod to administer its jurisdiction and lead the Eastern Orthodox Church in the preservation and teaching of the apostolic and patristic traditions and church practices.

Each bishop has a territory (see) over which he governs. His main duty is to make sure the traditions and practices of the Eastern Orthodox Church are preserved. Bishops are equal in authority and cannot interfere in the jurisdiction of another bishop. Administratively, these bishops and their territories are organised into various autocephalous groups or synods of bishops who gather together at least twice each year to discuss the state of affairs within their respective sees. While bishops and their autocephalous synods have the ability to administer guidance in individual cases, their actions do not usually set precedents that affect the entire Eastern Orthodox Church. Bishops are almost always chosen from the monastic ranks and must remain unmarried.

=== Church councils ===
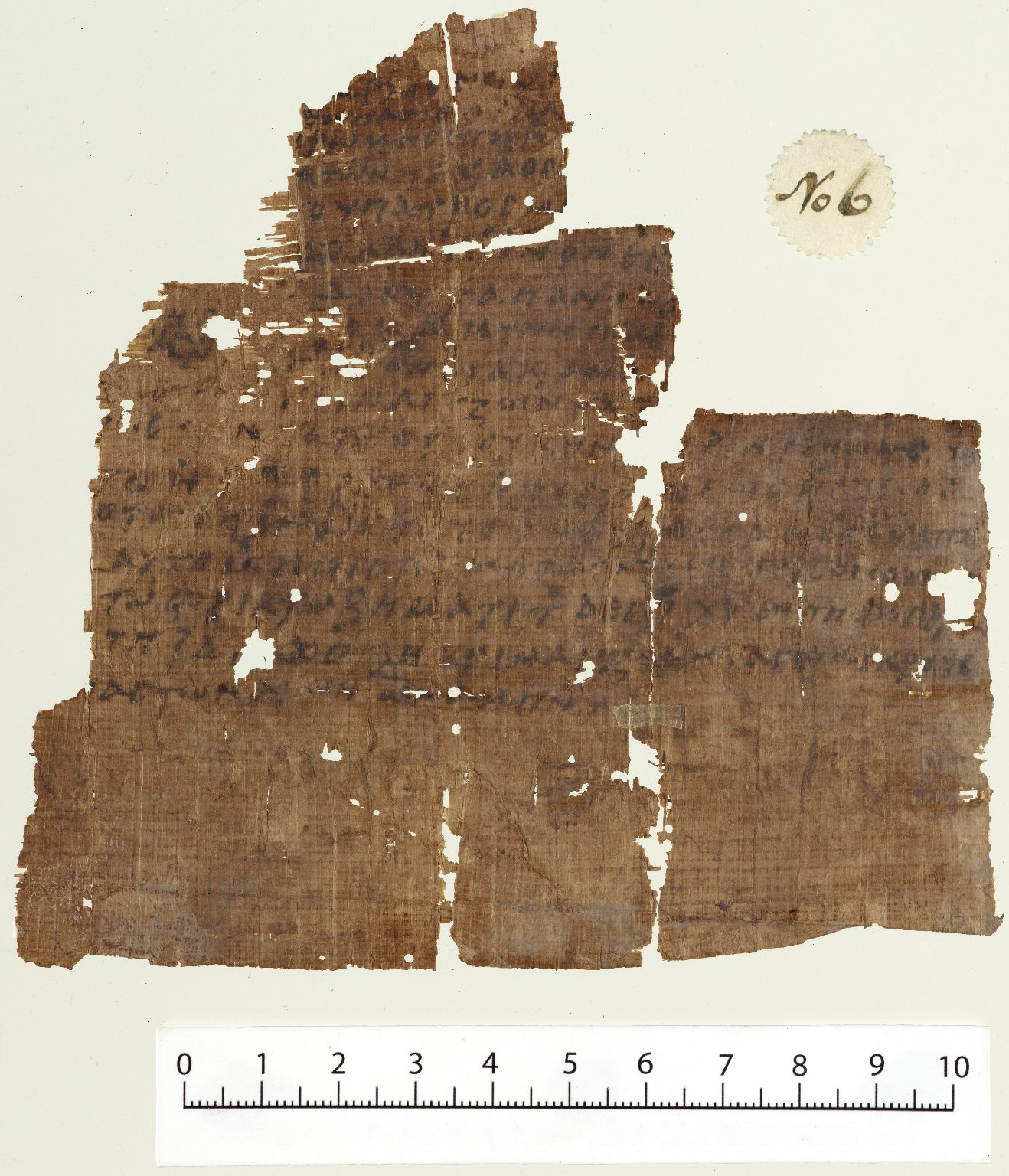
Oldest extant manuscript of the Nicene Creed, dated to the fifth century

The ecumenical councils followed a democratic form, with each bishop having one vote. Though present and allowed to speak before the council, members of the Imperial Roman/Byzantine court, abbots, priests, deacons, monks and laymen were not allowed to vote. The primary goal of these great synods was to verify and confirm the fundamental beliefs of the Great Christian Church as truth, and to remove as heresy any false teachings that would threaten the Christian Church. The pope of Rome at that time held the position of primus inter pares ("first among equals") and, while he was not present at any of the councils, he continued to hold this title until the East–West Schism of 1054.

Other councils have helped to define the Eastern Orthodox position, specifically the Quinisext Council, the Synods of Constantinople, 879–880, 1341, 1347, 1351, 1583, 1819, and 1872, the Synod of Iași, 1642, and the Pan-Orthodox Synod of Jerusalem, 1672; the Pan-Orthodox Council, held in Greece in 2016, was the only such Eastern Orthodox council in modern times.

According to Eastern Orthodox teaching the position of "first among equals" gives no additional power or authority to the bishop that holds it, but rather that this person sits as organisational head of a council of equals (like a president).

One of the decisions made by the First Council of Constantinople (the second ecumenical council, meeting in 381) and supported by later such councils was that the Patriarch of Constantinople should be given equal honour to the Pope of Rome since Constantinople was considered to be the "New Rome". According to the third canon of the second ecumenical council: "Because [Constantinople] is new Rome, the bishop of Constantinople is to enjoy the privileges of honor after the bishop of Rome".

The 28th canon of the fourth ecumenical council clarified this point by stating: "For the Fathers rightly granted privileges to the throne of Old Rome because it was the royal city. And the One Hundred and Fifty most religious Bishops (i.e. the second ecumenical council in 381) actuated by the same consideration, gave equal privileges to the most holy throne of New Rome, justly judging that the city which is honoured with the Sovereignty and the Senate, and enjoys equal privileges with the old imperial Rome, should in ecclesiastical matters also be magnified as she is."

Because of the schism, the Eastern Orthodox no longer recognise the primacy of the pope of Rome. The patriarch of Constantinople therefore, like the Pope before him, now enjoys the title of "first among equals".

=== Adherents ===
Distribution of Eastern Orthodoxy in the world by country Dominant religion Important minority religion

The most reliable estimates currently available number Eastern Orthodox adherents at around 220 million, making Eastern Orthodoxy the second largest Christian communion in the world after the Catholic Church. (Note: The numerous Protestant groups in the world, if taken all together, substantially outnumber the Eastern Orthodox, but they differ theologically and do not form a single communion.)

According to the 2015 Yearbook of International Religious Demography, as of 2010, the Eastern Orthodox population was 4% of the global population, declining from 7.1% in 1910. The study also found a decrease in proportional terms, with Eastern Orthodox Christians making up 12.2% of the world's total Christian population in 2015 compared to 20.4% a century earlier. A 2017 report by the Pew Research Center reached similar figures, noting that Eastern Orthodoxy has seen slower growth and less geographic spread than Catholicism and Protestantism, which were driven by missionary activity across the world.

Over two-thirds of all Eastern Orthodox members are concentrated in Southeast Europe, Eastern Europe and Russia, with significant minorities in Central Asia and the Levant. However, Eastern Orthodoxy has become more globalised over the last century, seeing greater growth in Western Europe, the Americas, and parts of Africa; churches are present in the major cities of most countries. Adherents constitute the largest single religious community in Russia (Note: According to Roman Lunkin in an interview about the 2012 survey published by Среда (Sreda), about 40% of the Russian Federation population is Orthodox. However, only 5% belong to a parish or regularly attend Divine Liturgy. Lunkin said that this was long known by experts but a myth persists that 80–90% of the population is Orthodox. According to The World Factbook 2006 estimate, 15–20% are practising Russian Orthodox but there is a large populations of non-practising believers.)—which is home to roughly half the world's Eastern Orthodox Christians—and are the majority in Ukraine, Romania, Belarus, Greece, (Note: Data are estimated, there are no census figures available, Greece is said to be 98% Orthodox by CIA, but additional studies found only 60–80% believe in God, if true, then no more than 80% may be Orthodox.) Serbia, Bulgaria, Moldova, Georgia, North Macedonia, Cyprus, and Montenegro; communities also dominate the disputed territories of Abkhazia, South Ossetia and Transnistria. Significant Eastern Orthodox minorities exist in Bosnia and Herzegovina, (Note: With an absolute majority in the subnational entity of Republika Srpska.) Latvia, Estonia, Kazakhstan, Kyrgyzstan, Lebanon and Syria.

Eastern Orthodox Christianity is a growing religion in certain Western countries, primarily through labour migration, from Eastern Europe, and to a much lesser degree conversion. Ireland saw a doubling of its Eastern Orthodox population between 2006 and 2011. Spain and Germany have the largest communities in Western Europe, at roughly 1.5 million each, followed by Italy with around 900,000 and France with between 500,000 and 700,000.

In the Americas, four countries have over 100,000 Eastern Orthodox Christians: Canada, Mexico, Brazil, and the United States; all but the latter had fewer than 20,000 at the turn of the 20th century. The U.S. has seen its community more than quadruple since 1910, from 460,000 to 1.8 million as of 2017; consequently, the number of Eastern Orthodox parishes has been growing, with a 16% increase between 2000 and 2010. (Note: According to Alexei Krindatch, "the total number of Orthodox parishes" increased by 16% from 2000 to 2010 in the United States, from this, he wrote that Orthodox Churches are growing. Krindatch did not provide figures about any change in the membership over that same period in his 2010 highlight.) (Note: According to Oliver Herbel, in Turning to Tradition, the 2008 US Religious Landscape Survey "suggests that if there is growth, it is statistically insignificant." The 2014 US Religious Landscape Survey also shows, within the survey's ±9.2% margin of sampling error corresponding to the sample size of the Orthodox Christian category being 186 people, a statistically insignificant decline within the category "Orthodox Christians" as the percentage of population from 2007 to 2014. But only 53% of people who were Orthodox Christian as children still self identify as Orthodox Christian in 2014. The Orthodox Christian category "is most heavily made up of immigrants and the children of immigrants.")

Turkey, which for centuries once had one of the largest Eastern Orthodox communities, saw its overall Christian population fall from roughly one-fifth in 1914 to 2.5% in 1927. This was predominantly due to the dissolution of the Ottoman Empire, which saw most Christian territories become independent nations. The remaining Christian population was reduced further by large-scale genocides against the Armenian, Greek, Assyrian communities; subsequent population exchanges between Greece and Turkey and Bulgaria and Turkey; and associated emigration of Christians to foreign countries (mostly in Europe and the Americas). Today, only 0.2% of Turkey's population represent various Christian denominations (320,000).

Denomination	Canonical Territory	Number of Members (minimum)	Number of Members (maximum)	Year
Russian Orthodox Church	Belarus, Kazakhstan, Mongolia, Kyrgyzstan, Russia, Tajikistan, Turkmenistan, Uzbekistan Disputed: China, Estonia, Finland, Japan, Latvia, Lithuania, Moldova, Ukraine	110,000,000	120,000,000 (Note: According to official figures of the Moscow Patriarchate, the Russian Orthodox Church claims approximately 160 million adherents worldwide, including more than 30 million in Ukraine. However, the canonical status of Eastern Orthodox jurisdictions in Ukraine remains disputed. Since the establishment of the Orthodox Church of Ukraine (OCU) in 2018 and its recognition by the Ecumenical Patriarchate in 2019, opinion surveys have consistently shown that a substantially larger share of Ukrainian Orthodox Christians identify with the OCU than with the Russian Orthodox Church.)	2012–2024
Romanian Orthodox Church	Romania Disputed: Moldova	16,000,000	19,000,000	2022
Church of Greece	Greece (excluding territories annexed 1912–1913)	8,500,000	10,003,402	2021–2022
Serbian Orthodox Church	Bosnia and Herzegovina, Croatia, Montenegro, Serbia, Kosovo, Slovenia	8,000,000		2021
Bulgarian Orthodox Church	Bulgaria	7,000,000	8,000,000	2013–2018
Ecumenical Patriarchate of Constantinople	Turkey (except the southeastern part of the country) and Greece (only the territories annexed by the country in the Balkan Wars between 1912 and 1913)	4,000,000	5,255,000	2016–2021
Greek Orthodox Patriarchate of Antioch	Syria, Lebanon, Turkey (SW), Iraq, Iran, Kuwait, Armenia, Azerbaijan	1,800,000	4,320,000	2012–2021
Georgian Orthodox Church	Georgia	3,500,000		2011–2018
Greek Orthodox Patriarchate of Alexandria	All Africa	500,000	1,500,000	2012–2021
Church of Cyprus	Cyprus	654,000	688,075	2021
Polish Orthodox Church	Poland	151,648	503,996	2021
Albanian Orthodox Church	Albania	400,000	500,000	2010–2021
Greek Orthodox Patriarchate of Jerusalem	Israel, Palestine, Jordan, Sinai (Egypt)	200,000	500,000	2008–2016
Orthodox Church of the Czech Lands and Slovakia	Czech Republic, Slovakia	75,000		2021
Eastern Orthodox Church (only universally recognized autocephalous churches)		160,780,648	181,845,473	2008–2024
Macedonian Orthodox Church	North Macedonia	1,350,000		2022
Orthodox Church of Ukraine	Ukraine (disputed)	21,300,000		2022
Orthodox Church in America	United States, Canada (disputed)	80,000		2021
Eastern Orthodox Church (including partially recognized autocephalous churches)		183,510,648	204,575,473	2008–2024

== Theology ==
=== Trinity ===
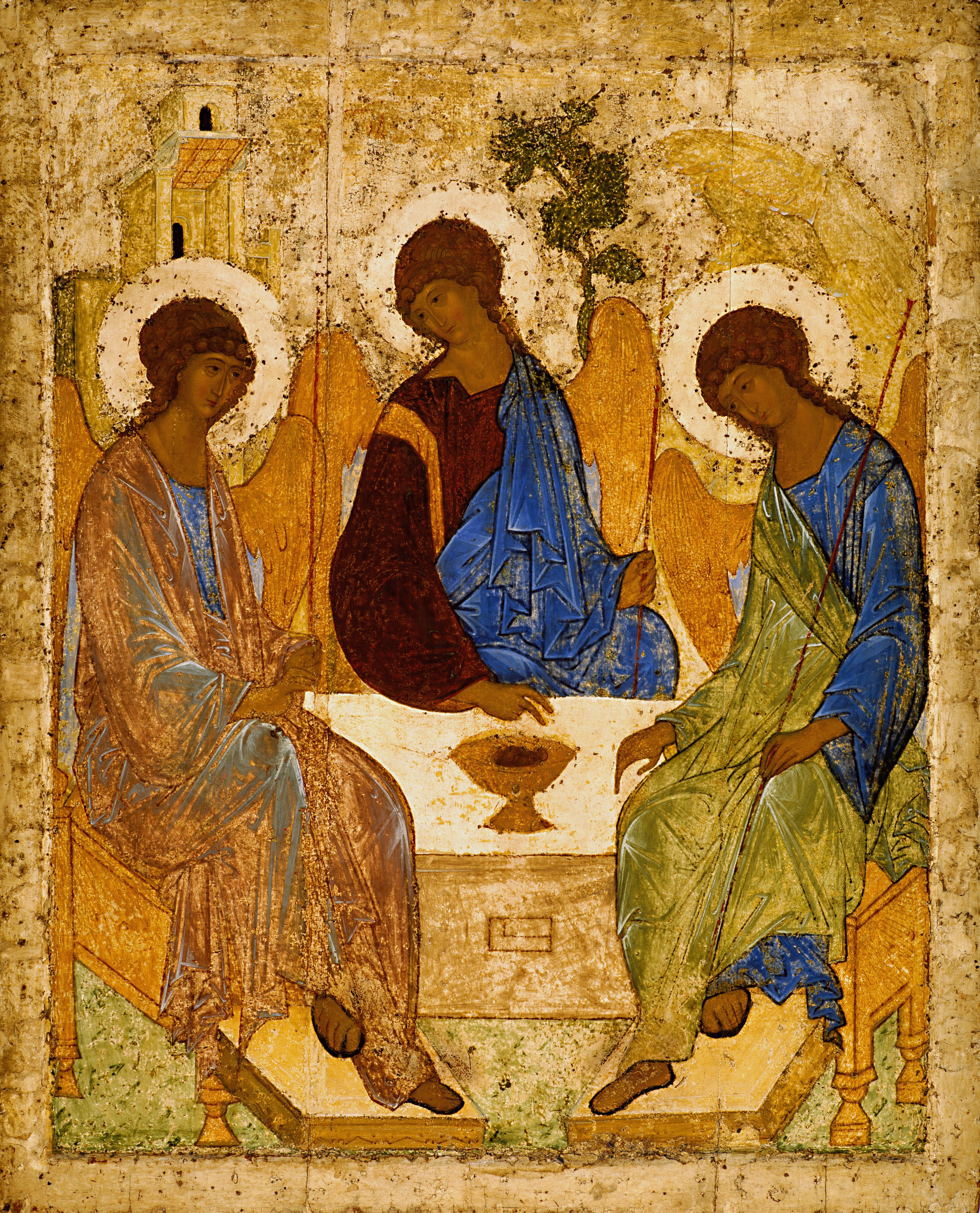
The Trinity by Russian icon painter Andrei Rublev, early 15th century

Eastern Orthodox Christians believe in the Trinity, three distinct, divine persons (hypostases), without overlap or modality among them, who each have the same divine essence (ousia, Greek: οὐσία)—uncreated, immaterial, and eternal. These three persons are typically distinguished by their relation to each other. The Father is eternal and not begotten and does not proceed from any, the Son is eternal and begotten of the Father, and the Holy Spirit is eternal and proceeds from the Father. Orthodox doctrine regarding the Trinity is summarised in the Nicene Creed.

Eastern Orthodox Christians believe in a monotheistic conception of God (God is only one), which is both transcendent (wholly independent of, and removed from, the material universe) and immanent (involved in the material universe).

In discussing God's relationship to his creation, Eastern Orthodox theology distinguishes between God's eternal essence, which is totally transcendent, and his uncreated energies, which is how he reaches humanity. The God who is transcendent and the God who touches mankind are one and the same. That is, these energies are not something that proceed from God or that God produces, but rather they are God himself: distinct, yet inseparable from God's inner being. This view is often called Palamism.

In understanding the Trinity as "one God in three persons", "three persons" is not to be emphasised more than "one God", and vice versa. While the three persons are distinct, they are united in one divine essence, and their oneness is expressed in community and action so completely that they cannot be considered separately. For example, their salvation of mankind is an activity engaged in common: "Christ became man by the good will of the Father and by the cooperation of the Holy Spirit. Christ sends the Holy Spirit who proceeds from the Father, and the Holy Spirit forms Christ in our hearts, and thus God the Father is glorified." Their "communion of essence" is "indivisible". Trinitarian terminology—essence, hypostasis, etc.—are used "philosophically", "to answer the ideas of the heretics", and "to place the terms where they separate error and truth." The words do what they can do, but the nature of the Trinity in its fullness is believed to remain beyond man's comprehension and expression, a holy mystery that can only be experienced.

=== Sin, salvation, and the incarnation ===
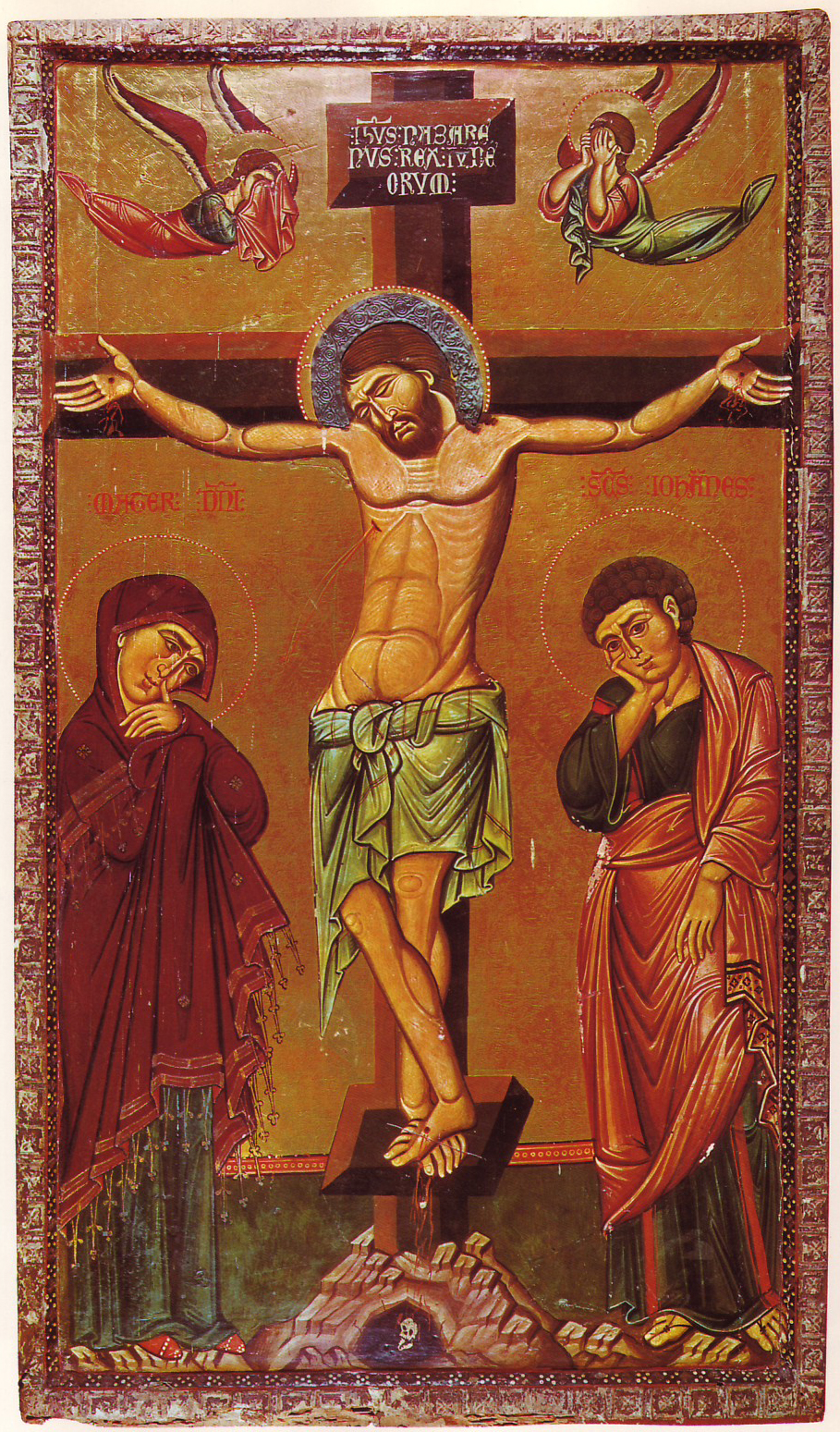
Crucifixion Icon from Saint Catherine's Monastery, 13th century

When Eastern Orthodox Christians refer to fallen nature they are not saying that human nature has become evil in itself. Human nature is still formed in the image of God; humans are still God's creation, and God has never created anything evil, but fallen nature remains open to evil intents and actions. It is sometimes said among Eastern Orthodox that humans are "inclined to sin"; that is, people find some sinful things attractive. It is the nature of temptation to make sinful things seem the more attractive, and it is the fallen nature of humans that seeks or succumbs to the attraction. Orthodox Christians reject the Augustinian position that the descendants of Adam and Eve are actually guilty of the original sin of their ancestors.

Since the fall of man, then, it has been mankind's dilemma that no human can restore his nature to union with God's grace; it was necessary for God to effect another change in human nature. Eastern Orthodox Christians believe that Christ Jesus was both God and Man absolutely and completely, having two natures indivisibly: eternally begotten of the Father in his divinity, he was born in his humanity of a woman, Mary, by her consent, through descent of the Holy Spirit. He lived on earth, in time and history, as a man. As a man he also died, and went to the place of the dead, which is Hades. But being God, neither death nor Hades could contain him, and he rose to life again, in his humanity, by the power of the Holy Spirit, thus destroying the power of Hades and of death itself.

Through Christ's destruction of Hades' power to hold humanity hostage, he made the path to salvation effective for all the righteous who had died from the beginning of time—saving many, including Adam and Eve, who are remembered in the church as saints.

=== Resurrection of Christ ===
The Eastern Orthodox Church understands the death and resurrection of Jesus to be real historical events, as described in the gospels of the New Testament.

=== Christian life ===
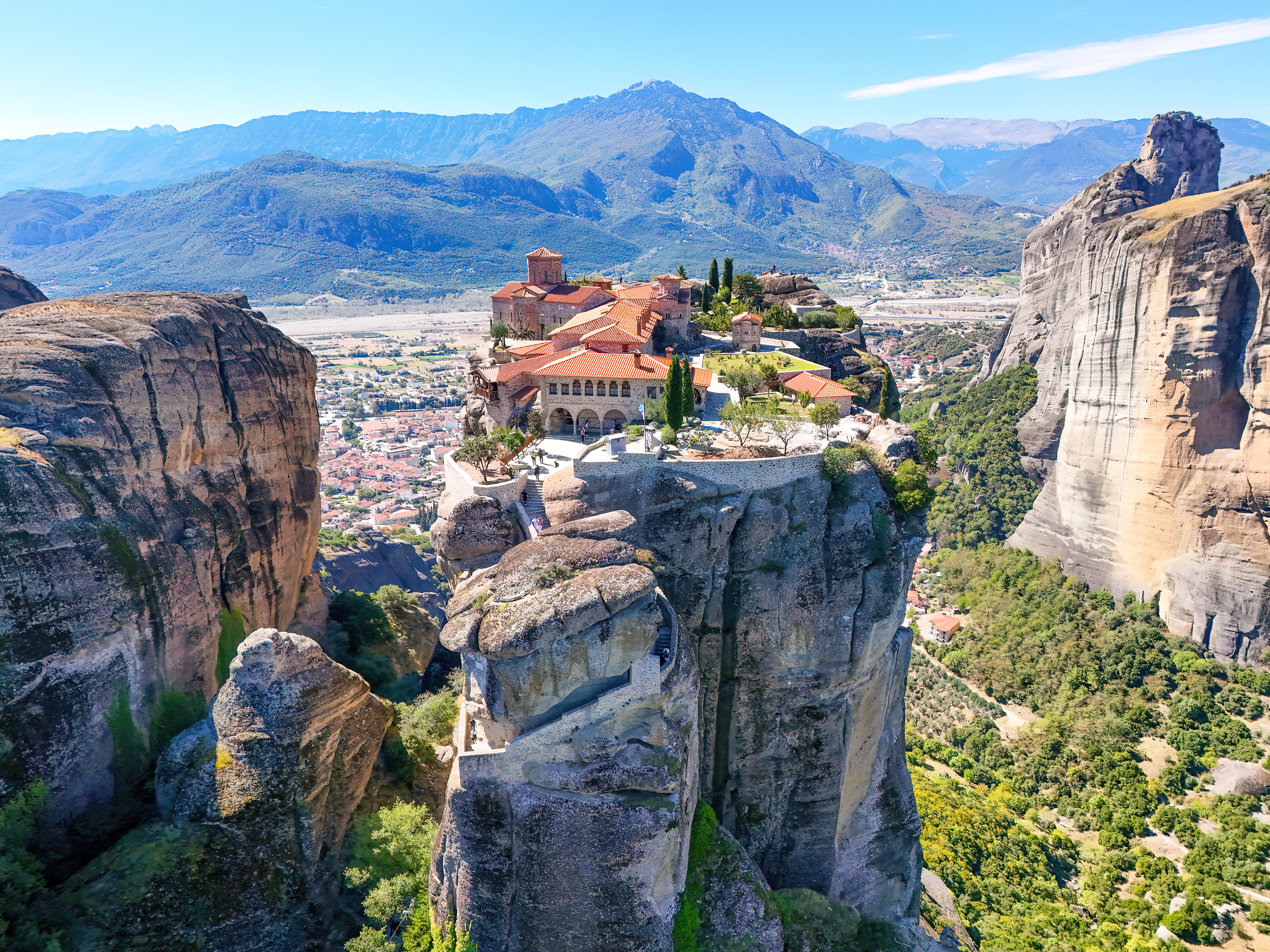
Monastery of the Holy Trinity in Greece.

Church teaching is that Eastern Orthodox Christians, through baptism, enter a new life of salvation through repentance whose purpose is to share in the life of God through the work of the Holy Spirit. The Eastern Orthodox Christian life is a spiritual pilgrimage in which each person, through the imitation of Christ and hesychasm, cultivates the practice of unceasing prayer. Each life occurs within the life of the church as a member of the body of Christ. It is then through the fire of God's love in the action of the Holy Spirit that each member becomes more holy, more wholly unified with Christ, starting in this life and continuing in the next. The church teaches that everyone, being born in God's image, is called to theosis, fulfilment of the image in likeness to God. God the creator, having divinity by nature, offers each person participation in divinity by cooperatively accepting His gift of grace.

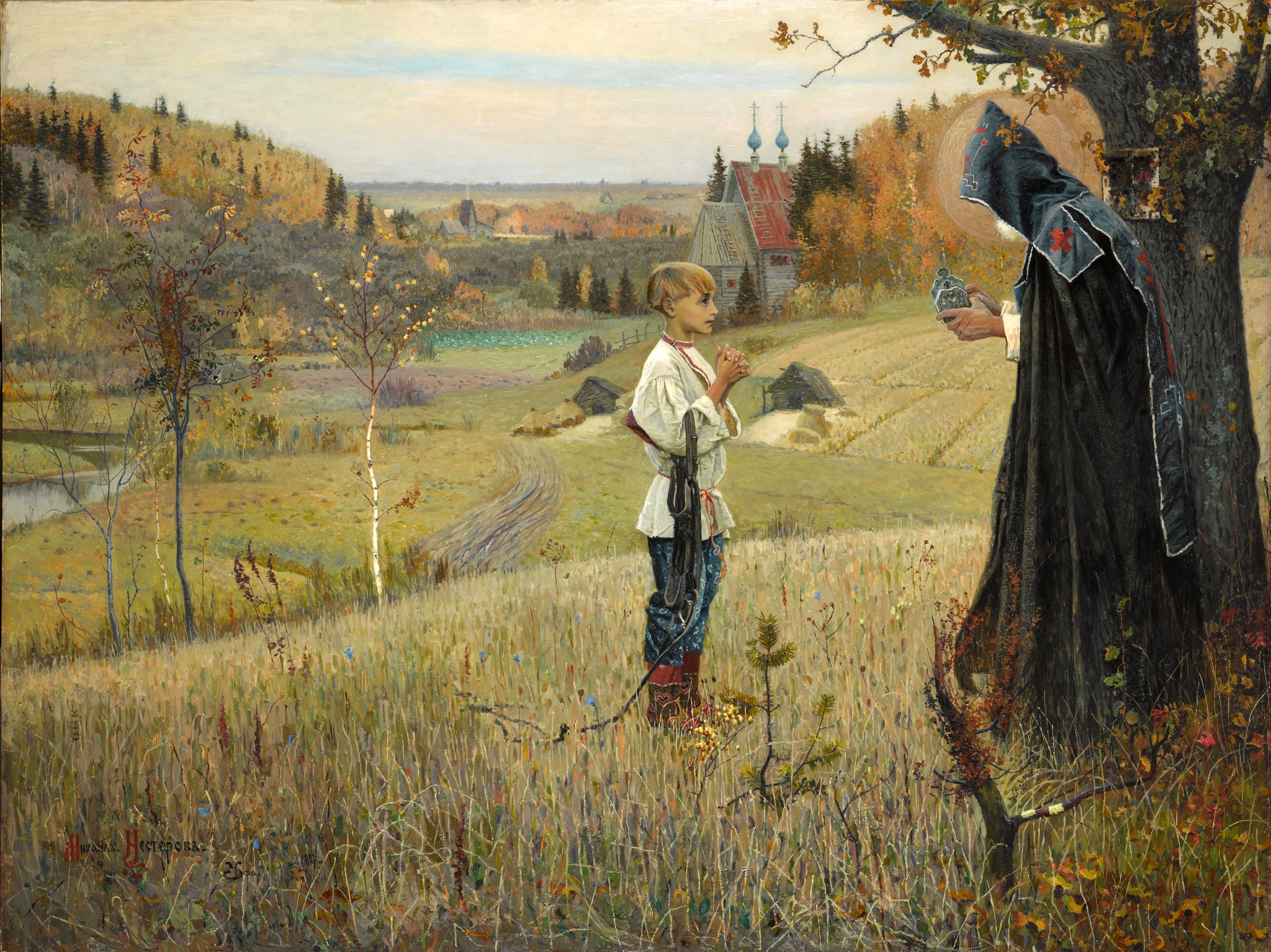
The Vision to the Youth Bartholomew by Mikhail Nesterov (1890).

The Eastern Orthodox Church, in understanding itself to be the Body of Christ, and similarly in understanding the Christian life to lead to the unification in Christ of all members of his body, views the church as embracing all Christ's members, those now living on earth, and also all those through the ages who have passed on to the heavenly life. "In general," Eastern Orthodox Christianity sees the Church "as a purely mystical body, the understanding of which cannot be attained through the development of a rational or natural theology."

The church includes the Christian saints from all times, and also judges, prophets and righteous Jews of the first covenant, Adam and Eve, even the angels and heavenly hosts. In Eastern Orthodox services, the earthly members together with the heavenly members worship God as one community in Christ, in a union that transcends time and space and joins heaven to earth. This unity of the church is sometimes called the communion of the saints.

==== Eastern Orthodox Order of Saint Benedict ====
The Order of Saint Benedict is an affiliation of monastics of the Eastern Orthodox Church who strive to live according to the Rule of St Benedict. The equivalent monastic order in the Catholic Church is known as the Order of Saint Benedict, abbreviated as OSB.

Within the United States, the Antiochian Orthodox Archdiocese of North America has at least one Benedictine monastery.

Several Benedictine monastic houses, sketes and hermitages fit within the Russian Orthodox Church outside of Russia, all of which are stavropegial directly under the Metropolitan. An oblate programme exists for Orthodox laity Saint Benedict Russian Orthodox Church in Oklahoma City, Oklahoma.

=== Virgin Mary and other saints ===
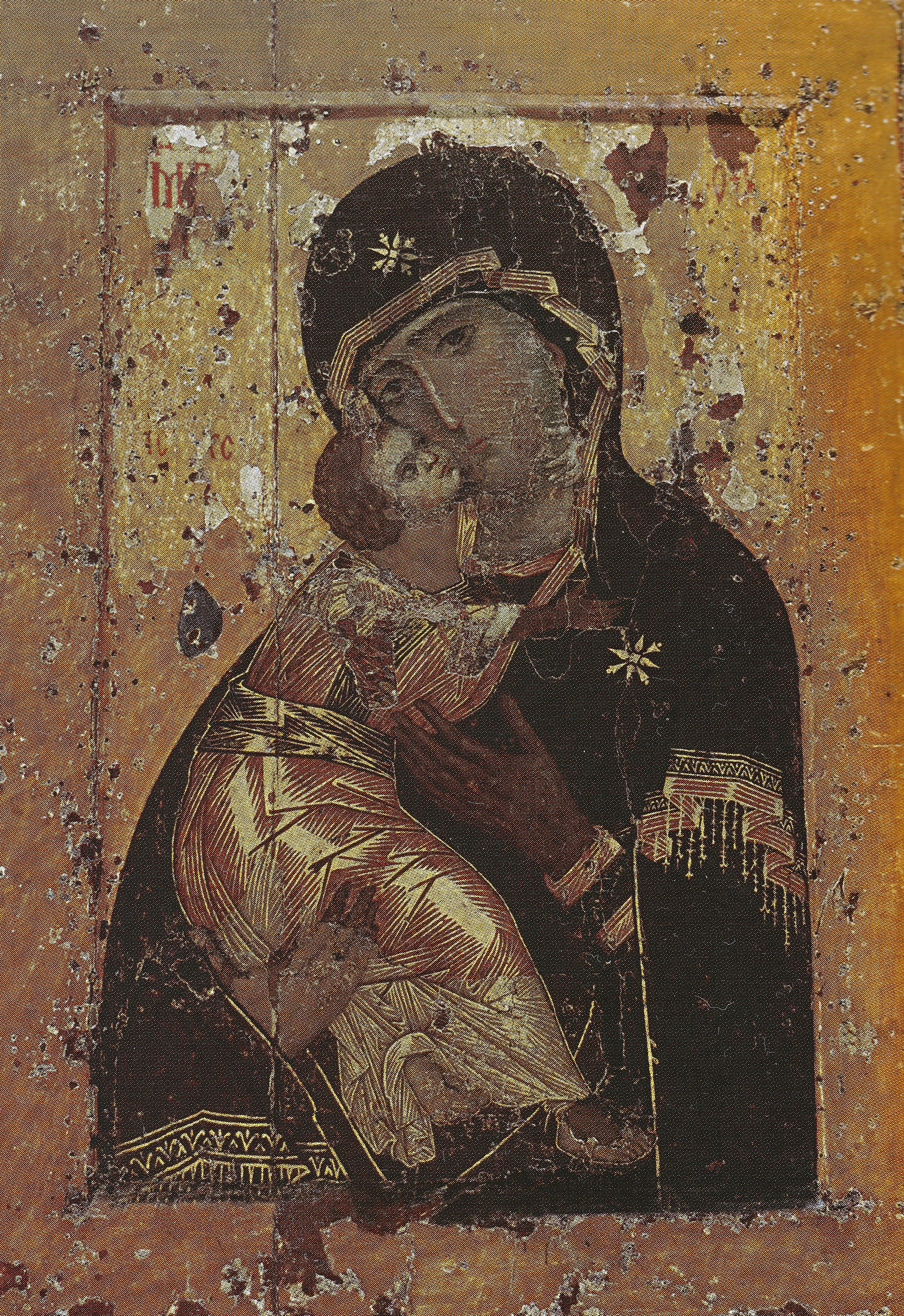
The Theotokos of Vladimir, one of the most venerated of Orthodox Christian icons of the Virgin Mary

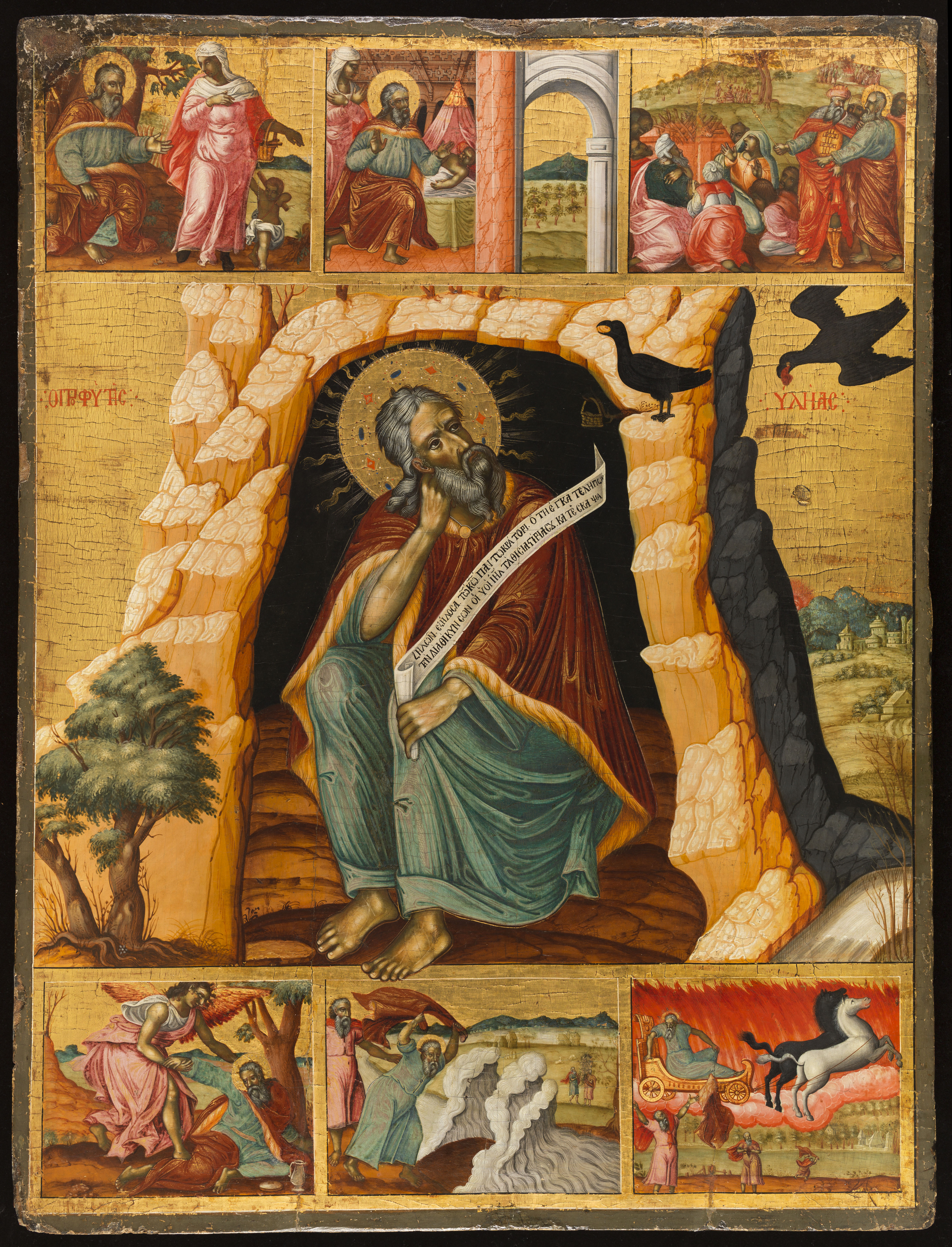
A 17th-century Bulgarian icon depicting Saint Elijah and scenes from his life

The Eastern Orthodox Church believes death and the separation of body and soul to be unnatural—a result of the Fall of Man. They also hold that the congregation of the church comprises both the living and the dead. All persons currently in heaven are considered to be saints, whether their names are known or not. There are, however, those saints of distinction whom God has revealed as particularly good examples. When a saint is revealed and ultimately recognised by a large portion of the church a service of official recognition (glorification) is celebrated.

This does not "make" the person a saint; it merely recognises the fact and announces it to the rest of the church. A day is prescribed for the saint's celebration, hymns composed and icons created. Numerous saints are celebrated on each day of the year. They are venerated (shown great respect and love) but not worshipped, for worship is due God alone (this view is also held by the Oriental Orthodox and Catholic churches). In showing the saints this love and requesting their prayers, the Eastern Orthodox manifest their belief that the saints thus assist in the process of salvation for others.

Pre-eminent among the saints is the Virgin Mary (commonly referred to as Theotokos or Bogoroditsa: "Mother of God"). In Eastern Orthodox theology, the Mother of God is the fulfilment of the Old Testament archetypes revealed in the Ark of the Covenant (because she carried the New Covenant in the person of Christ) and the burning bush that appeared before Moses (symbolising the Mother of God's carrying of God without being consumed).

The Eastern Orthodox believe that Christ, from the moment of his conception, was both fully God and fully human. Mary is thus called the Theotokos or Bogoroditsa as an affirmation of the divinity of the one to whom she gave birth. It is also believed that her virginity was not compromised in conceiving God-incarnate, that she was not harmed and that she remained forever a virgin. Scriptural references to "brothers" of Christ are interpreted as kin, given that the word "brother" was used in multiple ways, as was the term "father". Due to her unique place in salvation history, Mary is honoured above all other saints and especially venerated for the great work that God accomplished through her.

The Eastern Orthodox Church regards the bodies of all saints as holy, made such by participation in the holy mysteries, especially the communion of Christ's holy body and blood, and by the indwelling of the Holy Spirit within the church. Indeed, that persons and physical things can be made holy is a cornerstone of the doctrine of the Incarnation, made manifest also directly by God in Old Testament times through his dwelling in the Ark of the Covenant. Thus, physical items connected with saints are also regarded as holy, through their participation in the earthly works of those saints. According to church teaching and tradition, God himself bears witness to this holiness of saints' relics through the many miracles connected with them that have been reported throughout history since biblical times, often including healing from disease and injury.

=== Eschatology ===
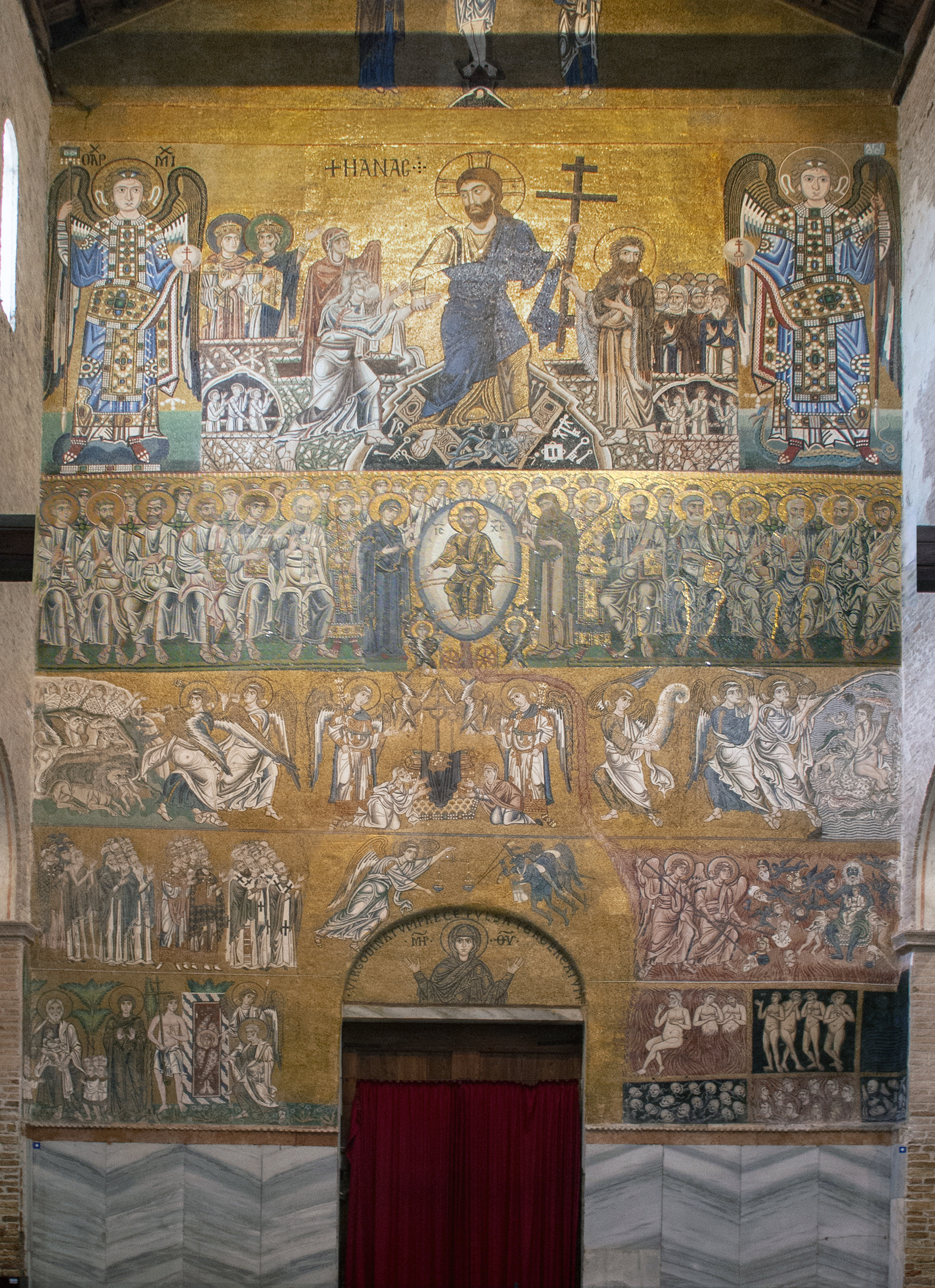
Last Judgment: 12th-century Byzantine mosaic from Torcello Cathedral

Orthodox Christians believe that when a person dies the soul is temporarily separated from the body. Though it may linger for a short period on Earth, it is ultimately escorted either to paradise (Abraham's bosom) or the darkness of Hades, following the Temporary Judgment. Orthodox do not accept the doctrine of Purgatory, which is held by Catholicism. The soul's experience of either of these states is only a "foretaste"—being experienced only by the soul—until the Final Judgment, when the soul and body will be reunited.

The Eastern Orthodox believe that the state of the soul in Hades can be affected by the love and prayers of the righteous up until the Last Judgment. For this reason the church offers a special prayer for the dead on the third day, ninth day, fortieth day, and the one-year anniversary after the death of an Orthodox Christian. There are also several days throughout the year that are set aside for general commemoration of the departed, sometimes including nonbelievers. These days usually fall on a Saturday, since it was on a Saturday that Christ lay in the Tomb.

The Eastern Orthodox believe that after the Final Judgment:

- All souls will be reunited with their resurrected bodies.
- All souls will fully experience their spiritual state.
- Having been perfected, the saints will forever progress towards a deeper and fuller love of God, which equates with eternal happiness.

=== Bible ===
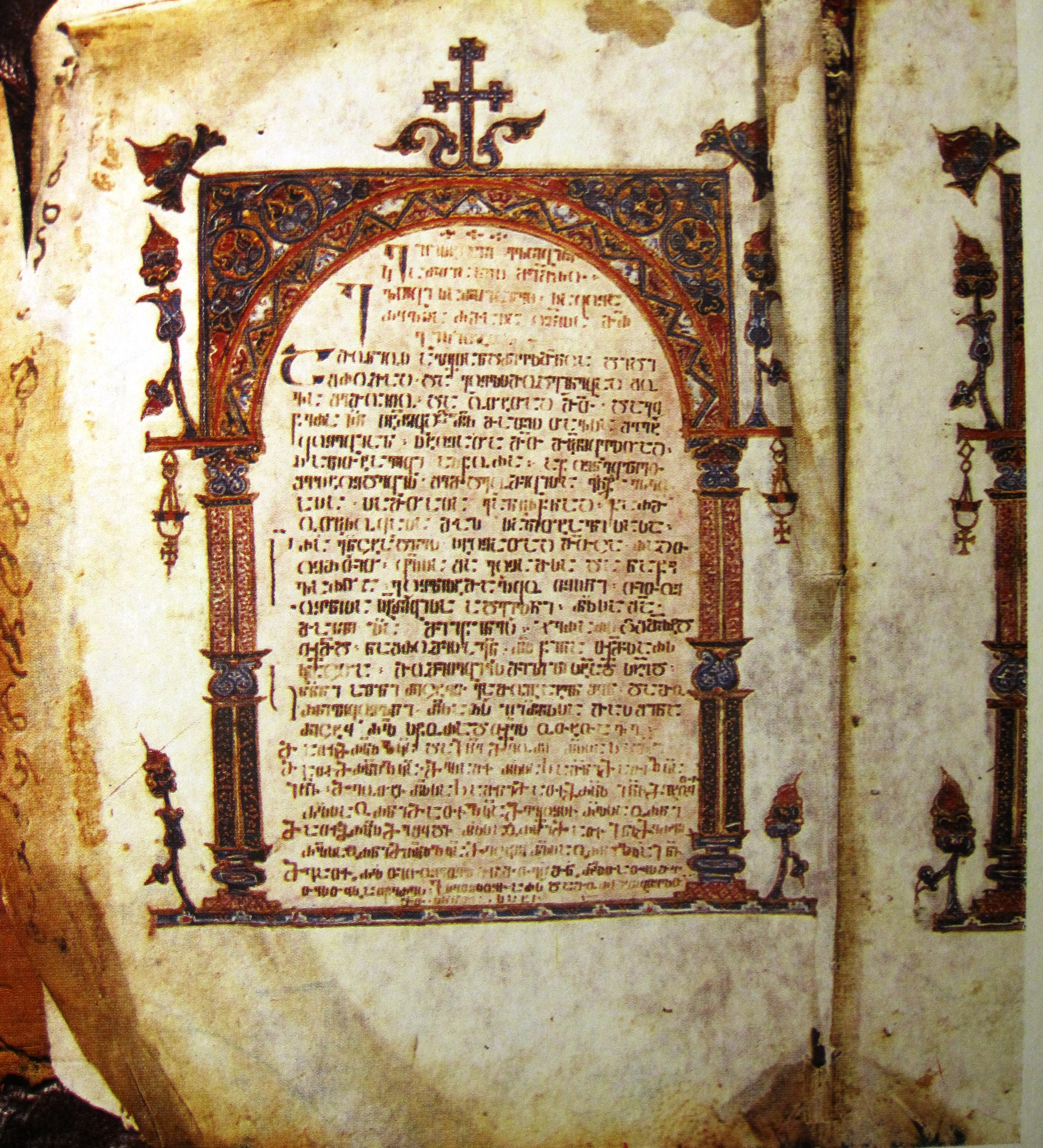
Alaverdi Gospels, an 11th-century Georgian illuminated manuscript Gospel Book

The official Bible of the Eastern Orthodox Church contains the Septuagint text of the Old Testament, with the Book of Daniel given in the translation by Theodotion. The Patriarchal Text is used for the New Testament. Orthodox Christians hold that the Bible is a verbal icon of Christ, as proclaimed by the 7th ecumenical council. They refer to the Bible as holy scripture, meaning writings containing the foundational truths of the Christian faith as revealed by Christ and the Holy Spirit to its divinely inspired human authors. Holy scripture forms the primary and authoritative written witness of holy tradition and is essential as the basis for all Orthodox teaching and belief.

Of the groups of scriptures significant enough to be named, the "Anagignoskomena" (ἀναγιγνωσκόμενα, "things that are read") comprises ten of the Old Testament books rejected in the Protestant canon, (Note: including the deuterocanonical books.) but deemed by the Eastern Orthodox worthy to be read in worship services, even though they carry a lesser esteem than the 39 books of the Hebrew canon. The lowest tier contains the remaining books not accepted by either Protestants or Catholics, among them, Psalm 151. Though it is a psalm, and is in the book of psalms, it is not classified as being within the Psalter (the first 150 psalms).

The Eastern Orthodox Church does not subscribe to the Protestant doctrine of sola scriptura. The church has defined what it considers scripture and also interprets what are its meanings.

Scriptures are understood to contain historical fact, poetry, idiom, metaphor, simile, moral fable, parable, prophecy and wisdom literature, and each bears its own consideration in its interpretation. While divinely inspired, the text still consists of words in human languages, arranged in humanly recognisable forms. The Eastern Orthodox Church does not oppose honest critical and historical study of the Bible.

== Liturgy ==
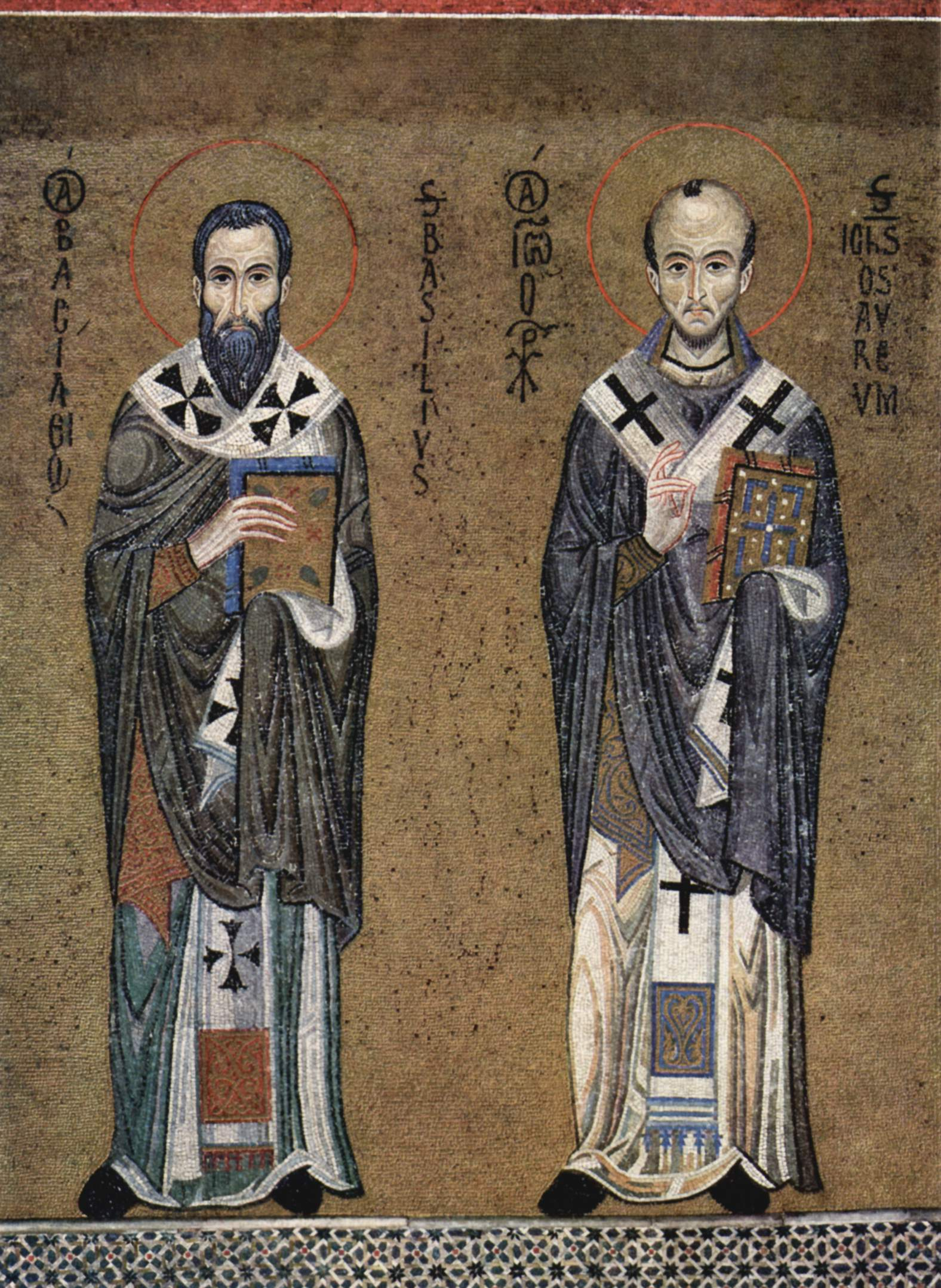
Icon of Ss. Basil the Great (left) and John Chrysostom, ascribed authors of the two most frequently used Eastern Orthodox Divine Liturgies, c. 1150 (mosaic in the Palatine Chapel, Palermo).

=== Church calendar ===
Lesser cycles also run in tandem with the annual ones. A weekly cycle of days prescribes a specific focus for each day in addition to others that may be observed.

Each day of the Weekly Cycle is dedicated to certain special memorials. Sunday is dedicated to Christ's Resurrection; Monday honours the holy bodiless powers (angels, archangels, etc.); Tuesday is dedicated to the prophets and especially the greatest of the prophets, John the Forerunner and Baptist of the Lord; Wednesday is consecrated to the Cross and recalls Judas' betrayal; Thursday honours the holy apostles and hierarchs, especially Nicholas, Bishop of Myra in Lycia; Friday is also consecrated to the Cross and recalls the day of the Crucifixion; Saturday is dedicated to All Saints, especially the Mother of God, and to the memory of all those who have departed this life in the hope of resurrection and eternal life.

=== Church services ===
The main service offered in the church is the Divine Liturgy. Most parishes offer this service on Sunday mornings and on major feast days, though it can be offered almost any day of the year. Additional services include Orthros and Vespers; prayer services in the morning and evening, respectively. The celebration of the feasts are distinguished according to their various degrees of solemnity. The great feasts are celebrated with an All Night Vigil. Lesser feasts will have a vigil according to the feast's custom.

Church service books are used in divine services, like the Gospel, the Epistle, and the Psalter. These books, often called divine service books, were composed in accordance with the scriptures and traditions of the Church Fathers and teachers of the Orthodox Church. During fasting, in the middle of the week Holy Communion is given at all church services, without removing the characteristics of Orthodox Lent.

==== Chanting ====
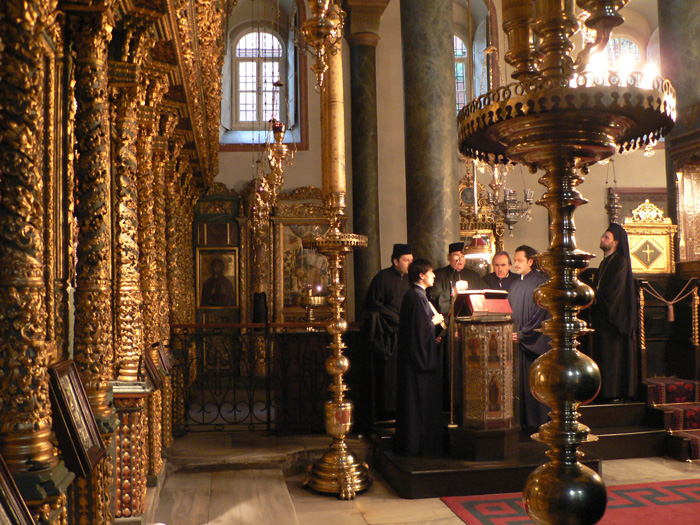
Chanters singing on the kliros at the Church of St. George, Patriarchate of Constantinople

Chanting is not considered "music" by Orthodox Christians, but rather sacred melody and prayer. An Orthodox Divine Service is chanted in its entirely by the clergy, the choir, and the congregation from the start of the service to the end. Early Christian forms of chanting began with ancient Judaic traditions of chanting the Psalms. As the Church grew, many new forms of hymns began to appear.

Liturgies contain the reading and chanting of prayers, headed by a bishop or priest. Various liturgies include different forms of chanting services (for example, the Liturgy of St. Basil the Great has chanting of longer duration and the priest privately reads his prayers at the altar). For the composition of religious chant, the Octoechos, an eight-tone (mode) system, analogous to the Gregorian modes in the West, and to other ancient Christian musical systems, is used. Byzantine music is microtonal.

Byzantine chants are associated with the Eastern Roman Empire's period (AD 330 to 1453) and developed from Jewish and Syrian traditions in the early Christian Church. This continued to evolve until the 16th century.

Northern Slav have used simpler tonal systems evolved through the local types of Znamenny chant; today Western music, often with four-part harmony, and the "tones" are simply sets of melodies. Russian liturgical chants (including those of some Ukrainian and Balkan churches) evolved from the Kievan Rus people after AD 988. Byzantine melodies adapted to the patterns of the Old Church Slavonic language. In the 14th century, Russian elements began to be used in the church. By the 16th century, Russian chants had many links to the Byzantine style.

There are numerous versions and styles that are traditional and accepted and these vary a great deal between cultures.

== Traditions ==
=== Art and architecture ===
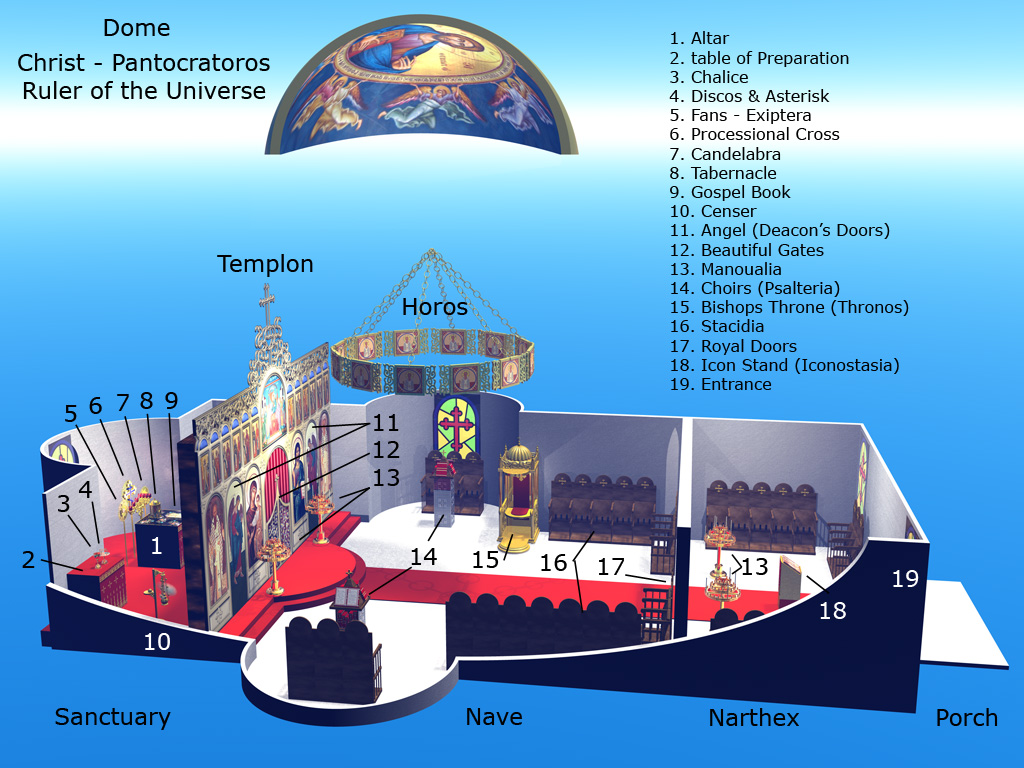
An illustration of the traditional interior of an Orthodox church

Eastern Orthodox church architecture constitutes a distinct and recognizable family of styles within church architecture. These styles share a cluster of fundamental similarities, having been influenced by the common legacy of Byzantine architecture from the Eastern Roman Empire. Some of these styles have become associated with the particular traditions of specific autocephalous Eastern Orthodox patriarchates, while others are more widely used throughout the Eastern Orthodox Church. These architectural styles have exerted substantial influence on cultures outside Eastern Orthodoxy, particularly on the architecture of Islamic mosques, as well as, to some extent, on Western churches.

=== Icons and symbols ===
==== Icons ====
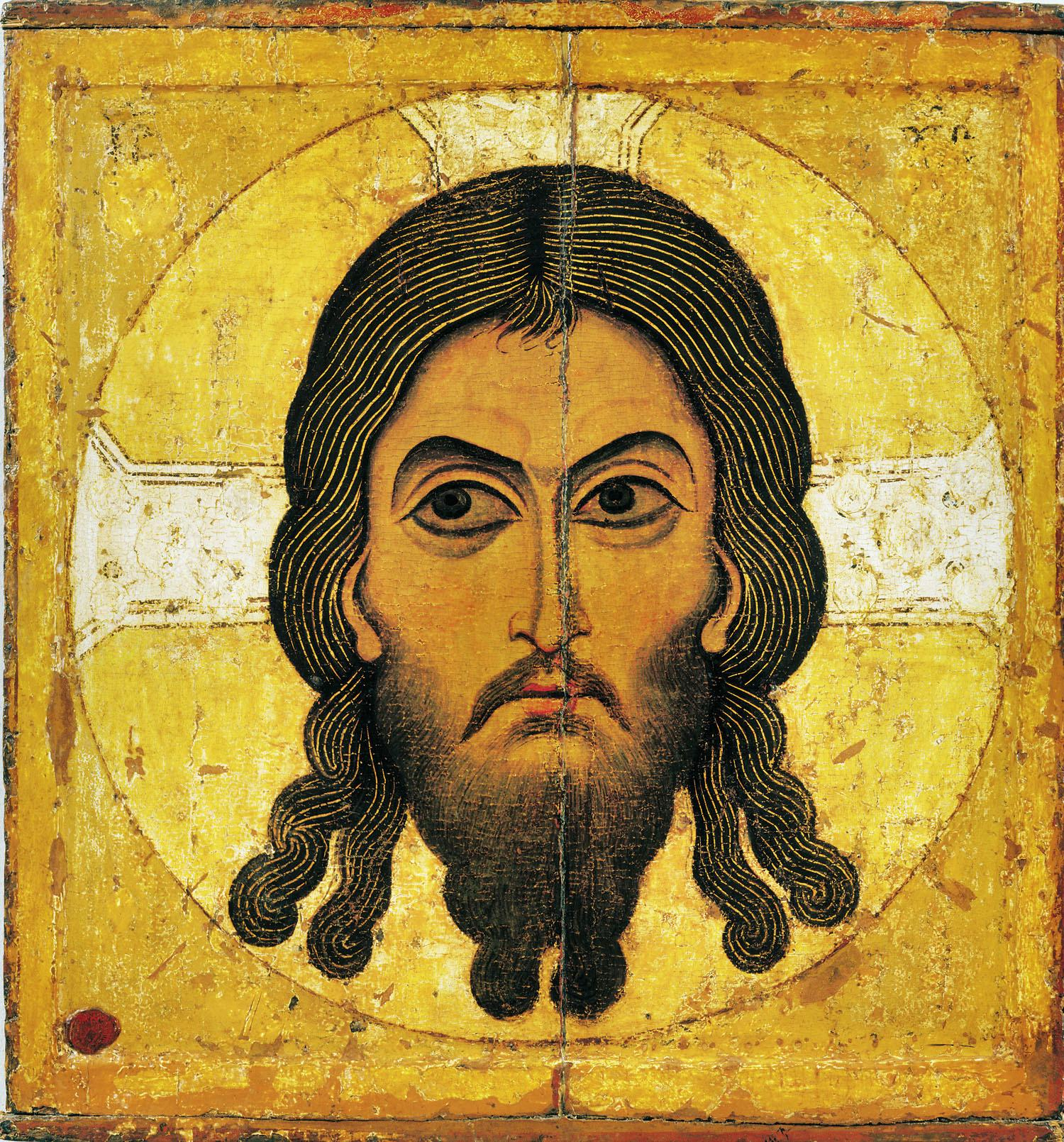
The Saviour Not Made by Hands, an icon of the Novgorod school, c. 1100

Aspects of the iconography borrow from the pre-Christian Roman and Hellenistic art. Henry Chadwick wrote, "In this instinct there was a measure of truth. The representations of Christ as the Almighty Lord on his judgment throne owed something to pictures of Zeus. Portraits of the Mother of God were not wholly independent of a pagan past of venerated mother-goddesses. In the popular mind the saints had come to fill a role that had been played by heroes and deities."

Icons can be found adorning the walls of churches and often cover the inside structure completely. Most Eastern Orthodox homes have an area set aside for family prayer, usually an eastern facing wall, where are hung many icons. Icons have been part of Orthodox Christianity since the beginning of the church.

==== Iconostasis ====
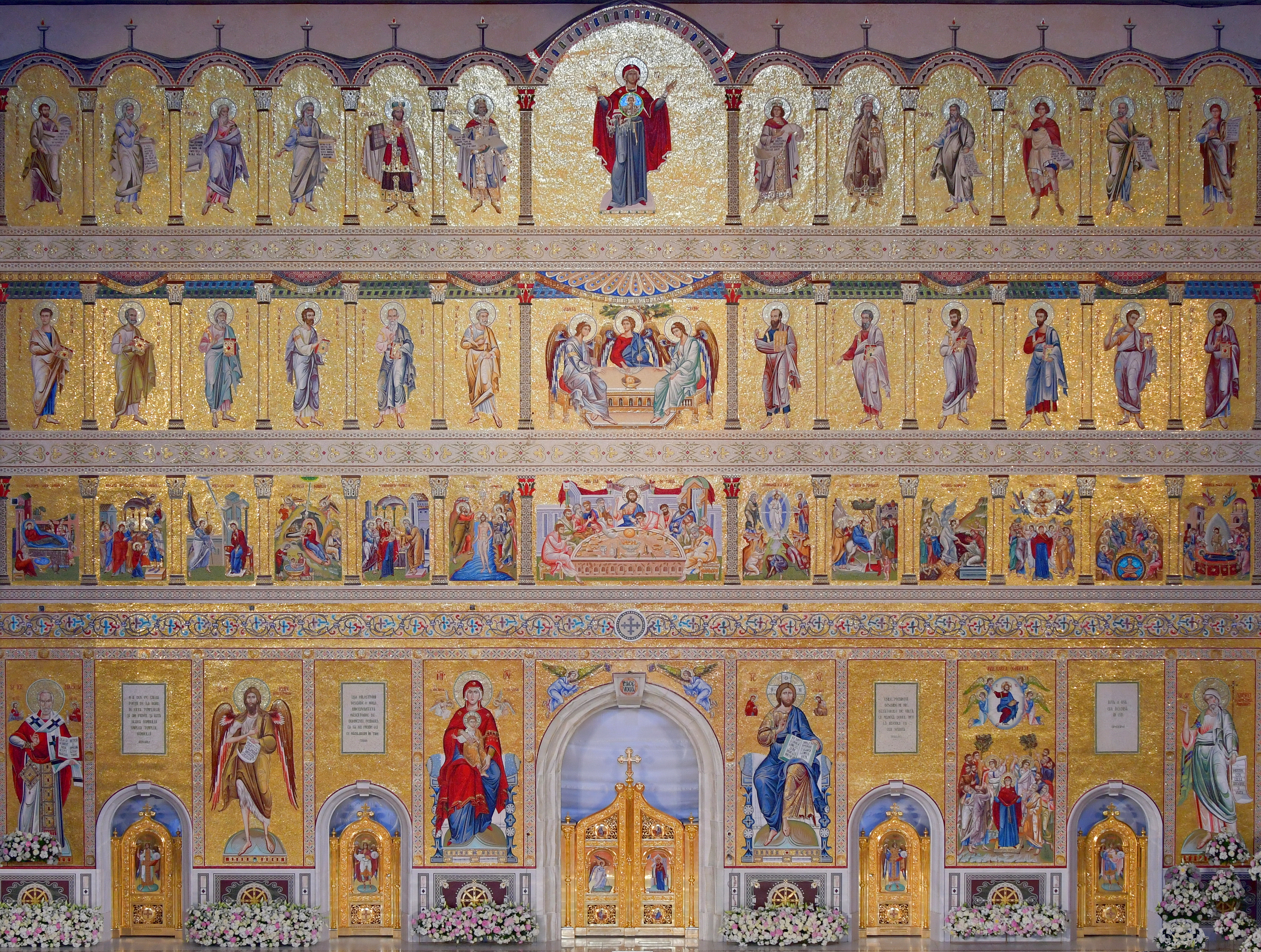
Iconostasis of the Romanian People's Salvation Cathedral

An iconostasis, also called the templon, is a wall of icons and religious paintings, separating the nave from the sanctuary in a church. Iconostasis also refers to a portable icon stand that can be placed anywhere within a church. The modern iconostasis evolved from the Byzantine templon in the 11th century. The evolution of the iconostasis probably owes a great deal to 14th-century Hesychast mysticism and the wood-carving genius of the Russian Orthodox Church.

The first ceiling-high, five-levelled Russian iconostasis was designed by Andrey Rublyov in the cathedral of the Dormition in Vladimir in 1408.

==== Cross ====
Greek cross

Orthodox cross

On the Russian Orthodox cross, the small top crossbar represents the sign that Pontius Pilate nailed above Christ's head. It often is inscribed with an acronym, "INRI", Latin: Iesus Nazarenus, Rex Iudaeorum for "Jesus of Nazareth, King of the Jews" or "INBI", Koine Greek: Ἰησοῦς ὁ Ναζωραῖος ὁ βασιλεύς τῶν Ἰουδαίων for "Jesus of Nazareth, King of the Jews".

Other crosses associated with the Eastern Orthodox Church are the more traditional single-bar crosses, budded designs, the Greek cross, the Latin cross, the Jerusalem cross (cross pattée), Celtic crosses, and others. (Note: A good explanation of the three-bar cross was written by Orthodox symbologist Alexander Roman. The Three-Bar Cross (accessed 21 December 2025)) A common symbolism of the slanted foot stool is the foot-rest points up, toward Heaven, on Christ's right hand-side, and downward, to Hades, on Christ's left. "Between two thieves Thy Cross did prove to be a balance of righteousness: wherefore one of them was dragged down to Hades by the weight of his blasphemy [the balance points downward], whereas the other was lightened of his transgressions unto the comprehension of theology [the balance points upward]. O Christ God, glory to Thee."

=== Local customs ===
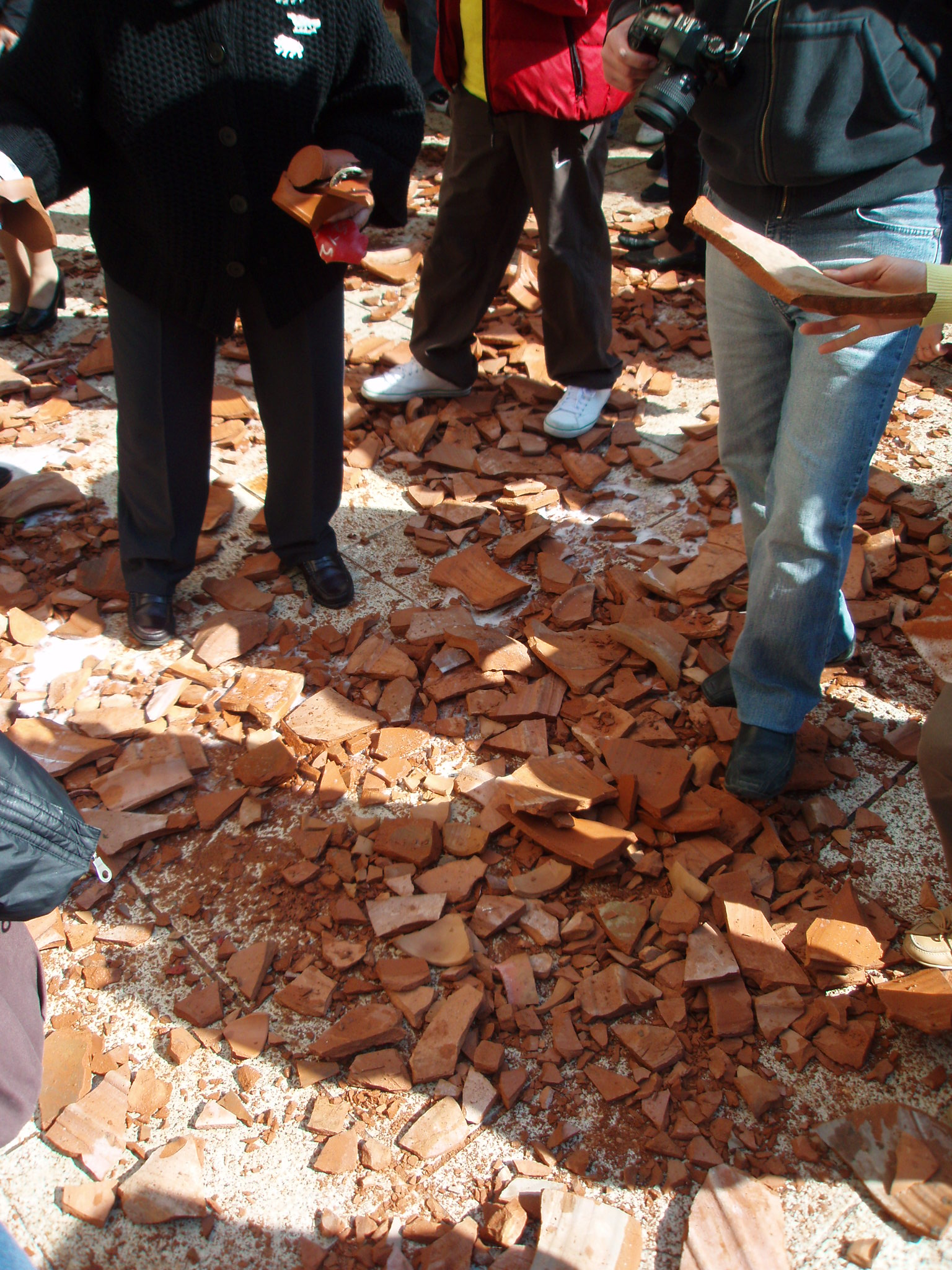
Shards of pottery vases on the street, after being thrown from the windows of nearby houses. A Holy Saturday tradition in Corfu.

Locality is also expressed in regional terms of churchly jurisdiction, which is often also drawn along national lines. Many Orthodox churches adopt a national title (e.g. Albanian Orthodox, Bulgarian Orthodox, Antiochian Orthodox, Georgian Orthodox, Greek Orthodox, Romanian Orthodox, Russian Orthodox, Serbian Orthodox, Ukrainian Orthodox, etc.) and this title can identify which language is used in services, which bishops preside, and which of the typica is followed by specific congregations. In the Middle East, Orthodox Christians are usually referred to as Rum ("Roman") Orthodox, because of their historical connection with the Eastern Roman (Byzantine) Empire.

== Holy mysteries (sacraments) ==
The Byzantine Rite is used for the administration of the "Holy mysteries" or seven sacraments in Eastern Orthodox Christianity; among these are Holy Communion (the most direct connection), baptism, Chrismation, confession, unction, matrimony, and ordination, as well as blessings, exorcisms, and other occasions.

While the Catholic Church numbers seven sacraments, and many Protestant groups list two (baptism and the Eucharist) or even none, the Eastern Orthodox do not limit the number. However, for the sake of convenience, catechisms of the Eastern Orthodox Church will often speak of the "seven great mysteries". The term "sacrament" also properly applies to other sacred actions such as monastic tonsure or the blessing of holy water, and involves fasting, almsgiving, or an act as simple as lighting a candle, burning incense, praying or asking God's blessing on food.

=== Baptism ===
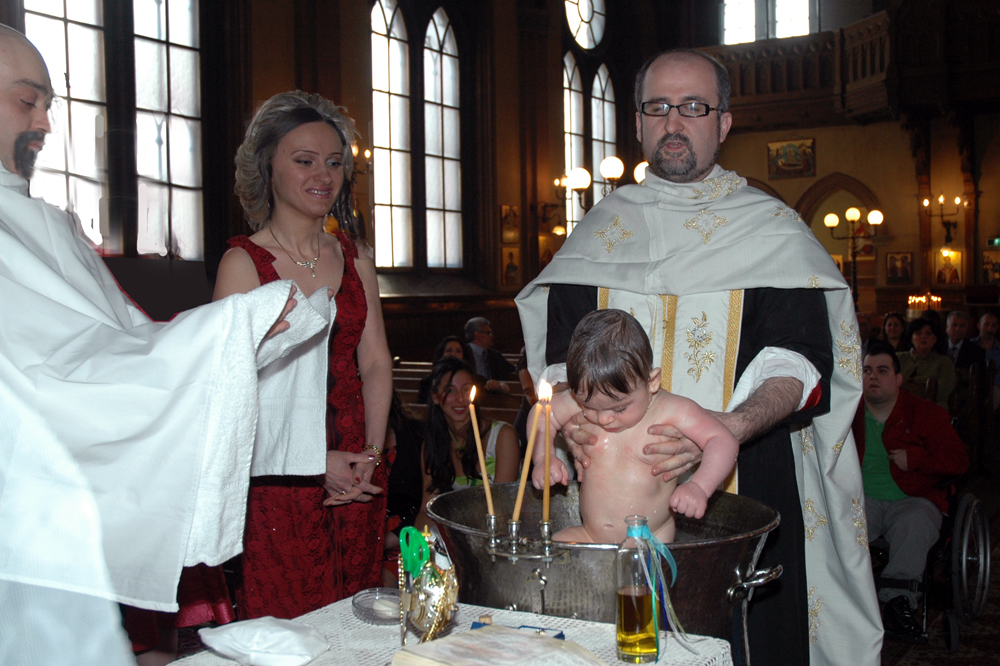
An Eastern Orthodox baptism

Baptism is the mystery which transforms the old and sinful person into a new and pure one; the old life, the sins, any mistakes made are gone and a clean slate is given. Through baptism a person is united to the Body of Christ by becoming a member of the Eastern Orthodox Church. During the service, water is blessed. The catechumen is fully immersed in the water three times in the name of the Trinity. This is considered to be a death of the "old man" by participation in the crucifixion and burial of Christ, and a rebirth into new life in Christ by participation in his resurrection.

Properly, the mystery of baptism is administered by bishops and priests; however, in emergencies any Eastern Orthodox Christian can baptise.

=== Chrismation ===
Chrismation (sometimes called confirmation) is the mystery by which a baptised person is granted the gift of the Holy Spirit through anointing with Holy Chrism. It is normally given immediately after baptism as part of the same service, but is also used to receive lapsed members of the Eastern Orthodox Church. As baptism is a person's participation in the death and resurrection of Christ, so Chrismation is a person's participation in the coming of the Holy Spirit at Pentecost.

A baptised and chrismated Eastern Orthodox Christian is a full member of the church and may receive the Eucharist regardless of age.

The creation of Chrism may be accomplished by any bishop at any time, but usually is done only once a year, often when a synod of bishops convenes for its annual meeting. Some autocephalous churches get their chrism from others. Anointing with it substitutes for the laying-on of hands described in the New Testament, even when an instrument such as a brush is used.

=== Confession ===
Confession of sins is especially seen as part of a person's preparation for communion.

=== Holy Communion (Eucharist) ===
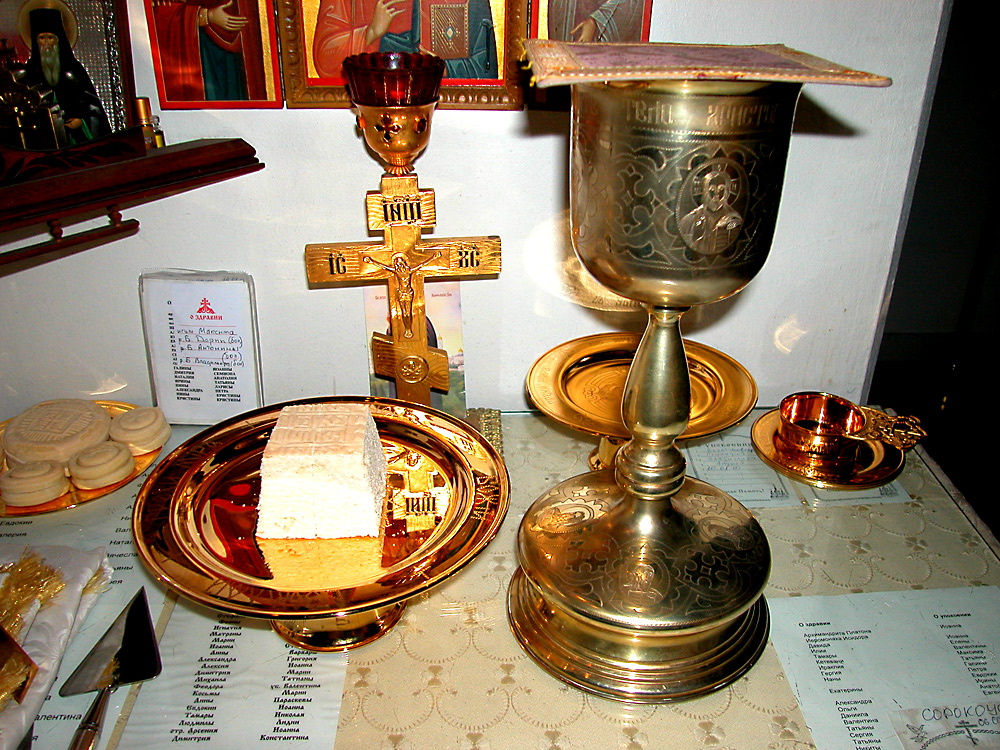
Eucharistic elements prepared for the Divine Liturgy

Holy Communion is given only to baptised and chrismated Eastern Orthodox Christians who have prepared by fasting, prayer and confession. The priest will administer the gifts with a spoon, called a "cochlear", directly into the recipient's mouth from the chalice. From baptism young infants and children are carried to the chalice to receive holy communion.

=== Marriage ===
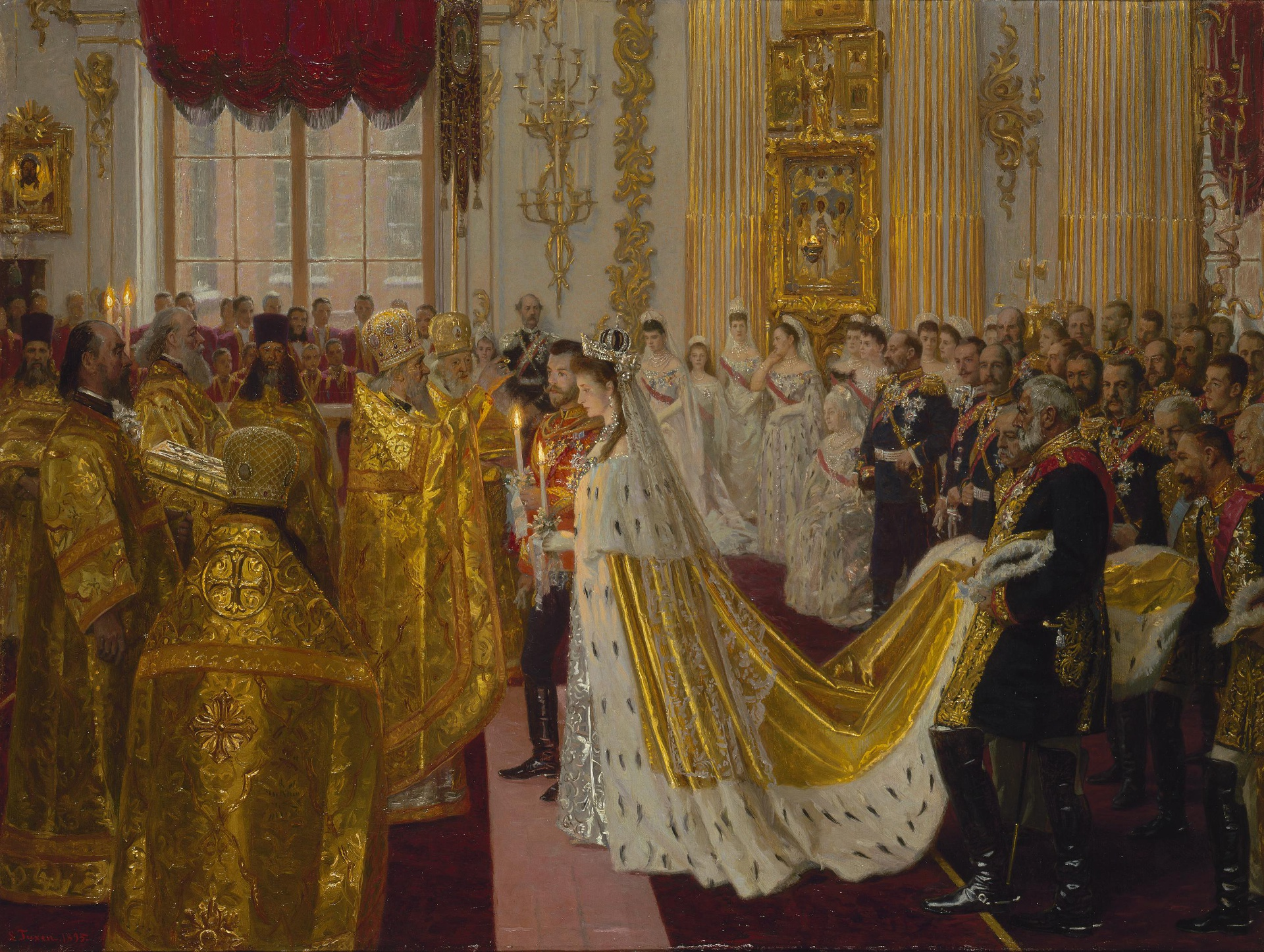
The wedding of Tsar Nicholas II of Russia by Laurits Tuxen

From the Eastern Orthodox perspective, marriage is one of the holy mysteries or sacraments. As well as in many other Christian traditions, for example in Catholicism, it serves to unite a woman and a man in eternal union and love before God, with the purpose of following Christ and his Gospel and raising up a faithful, holy family through their holy union. The church understands marriage to be the union of one man and one woman, and certain Orthodox leaders have spoken out strongly in opposition to the civil institution of same-sex marriage.

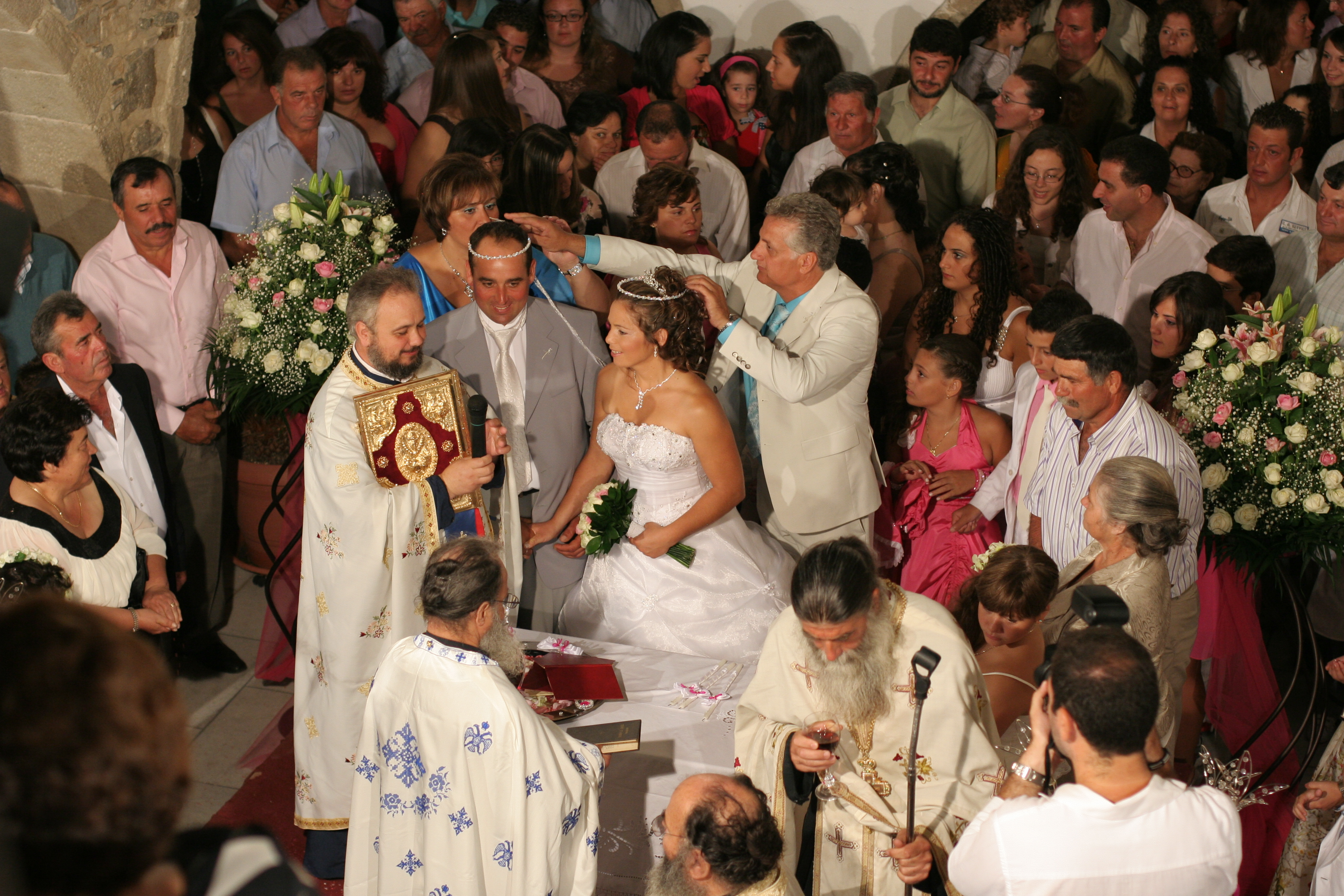
Greek Orthodox wedding

Jesus said that "when they rise from the dead, they neither marry nor are given in marriage, but are like angels in heaven" (Mk 12:25). For the Orthodox Christian this passage should not be understood to imply that Christian marriage will not remain a reality in the Kingdom, but points to the fact that relations will not be "fleshy", but "spiritual". Love between wife and husband, as an icon of relationship between Christ and church, is eternal.

The church does recognise that there are rare occasions when it is better that couples do separate, but there is no official recognition of civil divorces. For the Eastern Orthodox, to say that marriage is indissoluble means that it should not be broken, the violation of such a union, perceived as holy, being an offence resulting from either adultery or the prolonged absence of one of the partners. Thus, permitting remarriage is an act of compassion of the church towards sinful man.

=== Holy orders ===
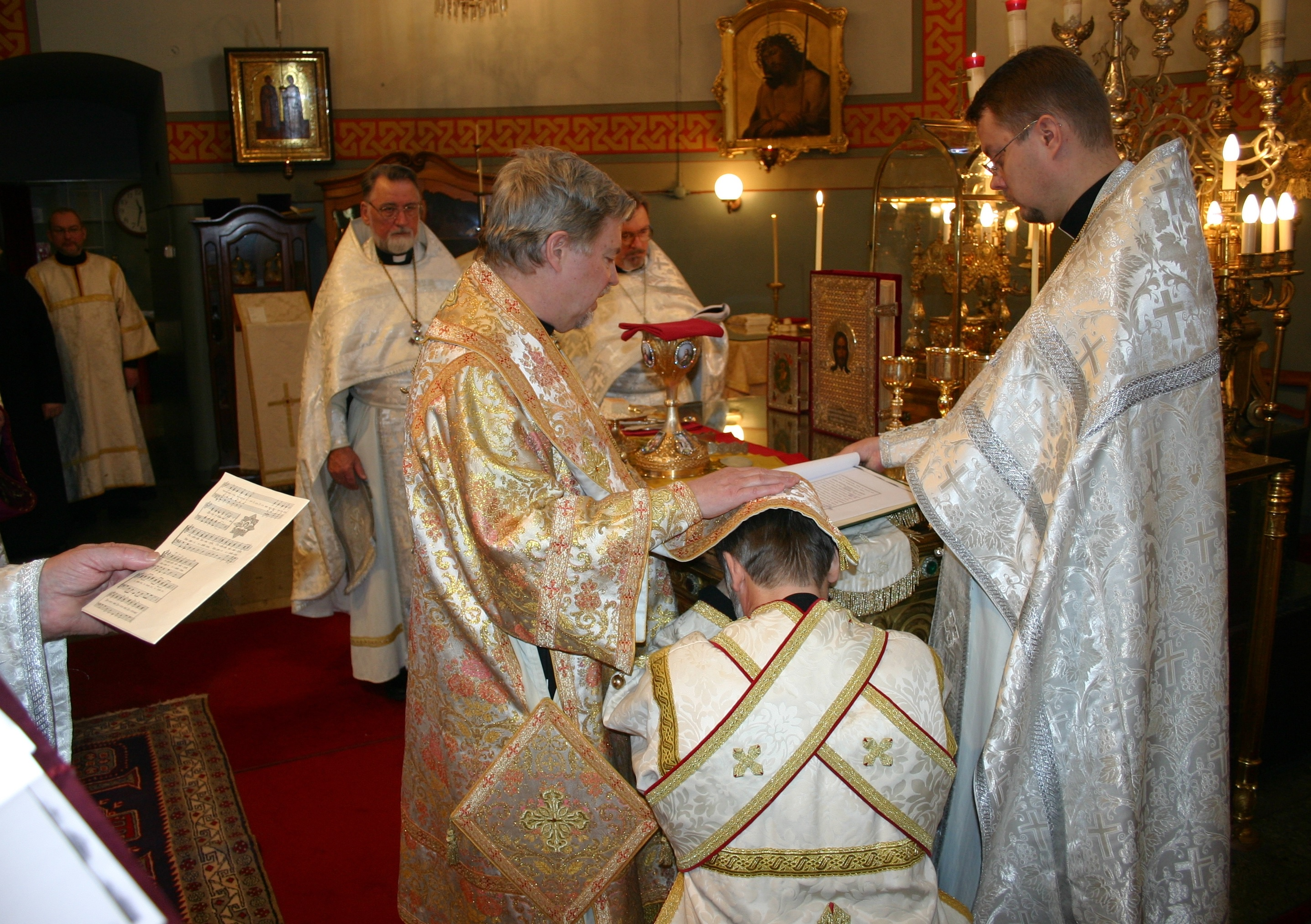
Eastern Orthodox subdeacon being ordained to the diaconate. The bishop has placed his omophorion and right hand on the head of the candidate and is reading the Prayer of Cheirotonia.

Widowed priests and deacons may not remarry and it is common for such members of the clergy to retire to a monastery (see clerical celibacy). This is also true of widowed wives of clergy, who do not remarry and become nuns when their children are grown. Only men are allowed to receive holy orders, although deaconesses had both liturgical and pastoral functions within the church. Women had been ordained as deacons or deaconesses in the Byzantine Church through the 9th century CE after which the practice fell into disuse.

In 2004, the Holy Synod of the Church of Greece voted to permit the consecration of women as 'deaconesses', without using the word 'ordination,' but only within monastic communities. In 2016, the Holy Synod of the Greek Orthodox Patriarchate of Alexandria voted to reinstate the female diaconate; in the following year, it ordained six sub-deaconesses in the Democratic Republic of Congo. In 2024 the Patriarchate ordained its first female deacon, Angelic Molen, in Zimbabwe, making her the first female deacon in the modern history of the Eastern Orthodox Church. This move was met with criticism from other autocephalous Orthodox church leaders and clergy, including the Antiochian Orthodox Christian Archdiocese of North America's Metropolitan Saba Esber and Archpriest John Whiteford of the Russian Orthodox Church Outside of Russia. Critics argued that the decision was made without sufficient pan-Orthodox consultation and raised concerns about its theological and ecclesiological implications. Whiteford also criticized some supporters of the restoration of the female diaconate for what he described as having broader ideological aims that went beyond the historical role of deaconesses in the Eastern Orthodox Church.

== Interfaith relations ==
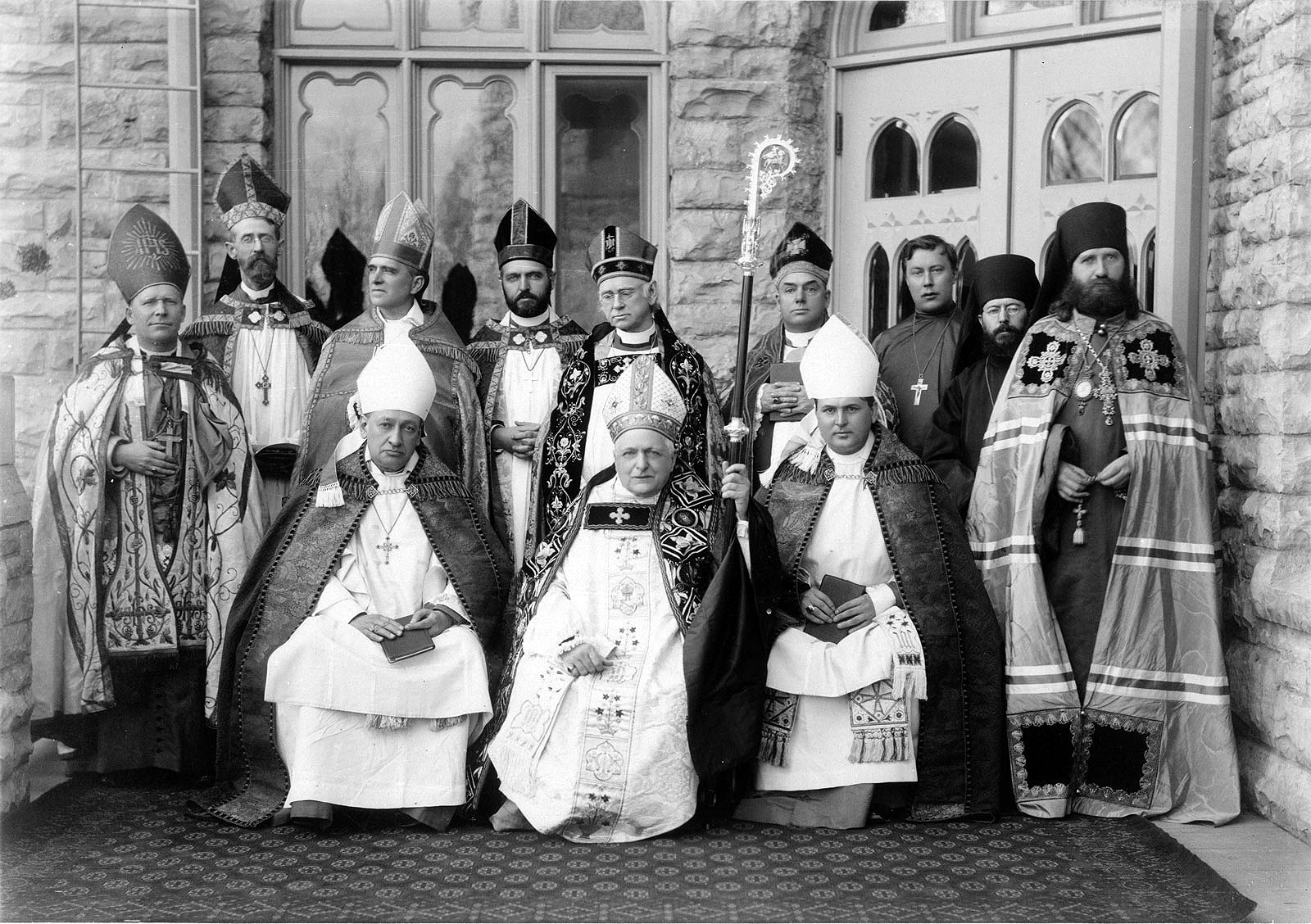
The consecration of Reginald Heber Weller as an Anglican bishop at the Cathedral of St. Paul the Apostle in the Episcopal Diocese of Fond du Lac, with Anthony Kozlowski of the Polish National Catholic Church and Tikhon, then Bishop of the Aleutians and Alaska (along with his chaplains John Kochurov and Sebastian Dabovich) of the Russian Orthodox Church present

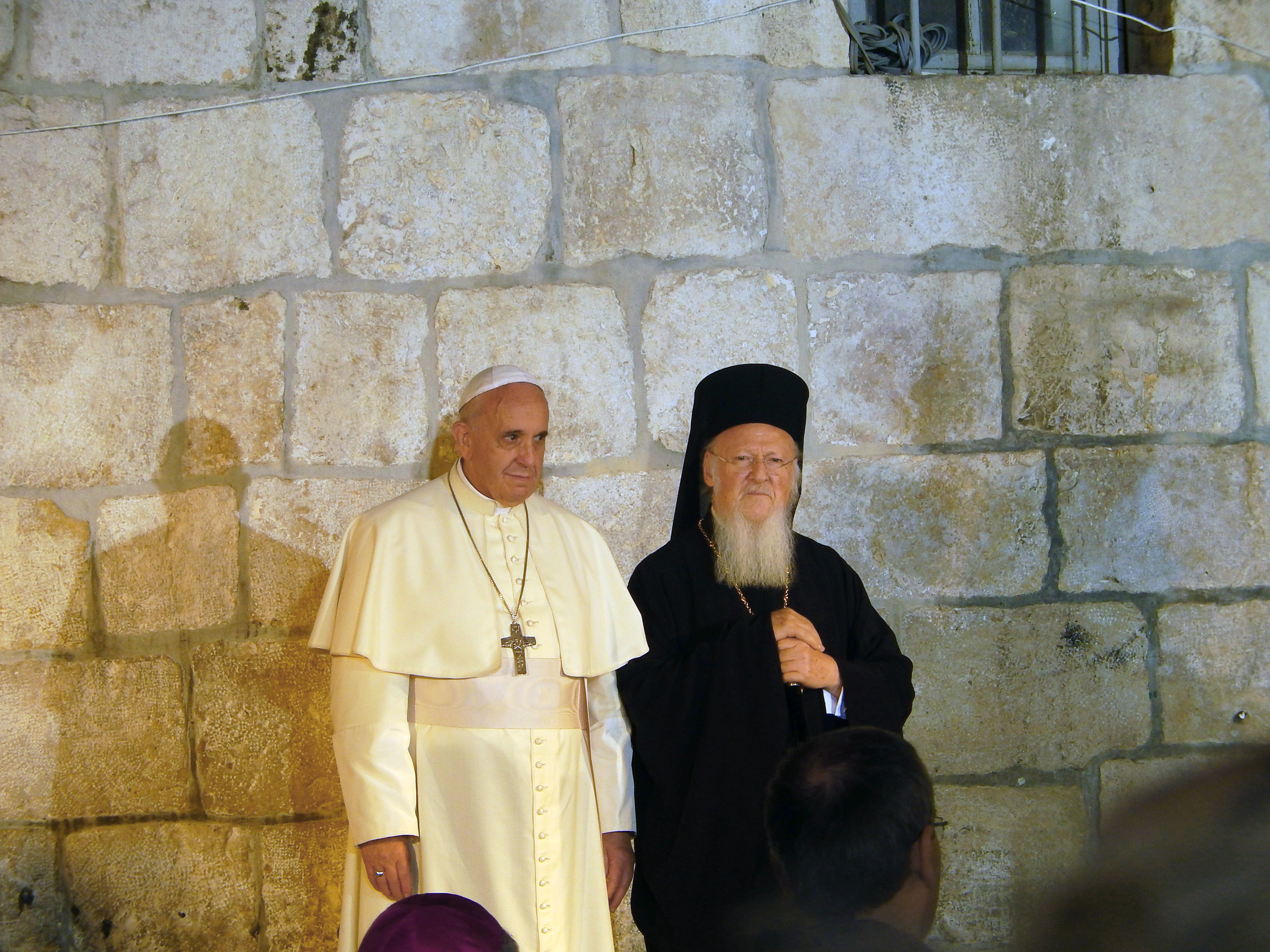
Pope Francis and Ecumenical Patriarch Bartholomew I in the Church of the Holy Sepulchre, Jerusalem, 2014

=== Relations with other Christians ===
In 1920, the Ecumenical Patriarchate of Constantinople, published an encyclical "addressed 'To all the Churches of Christ, wherever they may be', urging closer co-operation among separated Christians, and suggesting a 'League of Churches', parallel to the newly founded League of Nations". This gesture was instrumental in the foundation of the World Council of Churches (WCC); as such, almost all Eastern Orthodox churches are members of the WCC and "Orthodox ecclesiastics and theologians serve on its committees". In 1922, the Ecumenical Patriarchate declared that the Anglican, Armenian Apostolic, Old Catholic, and Roman Catholic churches possessed "the same validity" of Holy Orders and apostolic succession. Following the Ecumenical Patriarchate were the autocephalous churches of Alexandria, Jerusalem, Romania, and Cyprus as well as the autonomous church of Sinai. In 1939, the Church of Greece affirmed that Anglican Orders could be received as valid, albeit "by economy" or "as an indulgence, not a right." However, in 1948, the Russian Orthodox Church declined to recognize the validity of Anglican Orders. Kallistos Ware, a British metropolitan bishop of the Orthodox Church, has stated that ecumenism "is important for Orthodoxy: it has helped to force the various Orthodox churches out of their comparative isolation, making them meet one another and enter into a living contact with non-Orthodox Christians."

Hilarion Alfeyev, then the Metropolitan of Volokolamsk and head of external relations for the Moscow Patriarchate of the Russian Orthodox Church, stated that Orthodox and Evangelical Protestant Christians share the same positions on "such issues as abortion, the family, and marriage" and desire "vigorous grassroots engagement" between the two Christian communions on such issues.

In that regard, the differences between the Catholic and Eastern Orthodox communions have not been improved in any relevant way. Dogmatic and liturgical polarities have been significant, even and especially in recent times. A pertinent point of contention between the monarchically papal, administratively centralised Catholic Church and the decentralised confederation of Orthodox churches is the theological significance of the Virgin Mary. During his visit to Georgia in October 2016, Pope Francis was snubbed by most Orthodox Christians as he led mass before a practically empty Mikheil Meskhi Stadium in Tbilisi.

The Oriental Orthodox Churches are not in communion with the Eastern Orthodox Church, despite their similar names. Slow dialogue towards restoring communion between the two churches began in the mid-20th century, and, notably, in the 19th century, when the Greek Patriarch in Egypt had to absent himself from the country for a long period of time; he left his church under the guidance of the Coptic Pope Cyril IV of Alexandria.

In 2019, the Primate of the OCU Metropolitan of Kyiv and All Ukraine Epiphanius stated that "theoretically" the Orthodox Church of Ukraine and the Ukrainian Greek Catholic Church could in the future unite into a united church around the Kyiv throne. In 2019, the Primate of the UGCC, Major Archbishop of Kyiv-Galicia Sviatoslav, stated that every effort should be made to restore the original unity of the Kyivan Church in its Orthodox and Catholic branches, saying that the restoration of Eucharistic communion between Rome and Constantinople is not a utopia.

Notwithstanding certain overtures by both Catholic and Eastern Orthodox leaders, the majority of Orthodox Christians, as well as Catholics, are not in favour of communion between their churches, with only a median of 35 per cent and 38 per cent, respectively, claiming support.

=== Relations with Islam ===
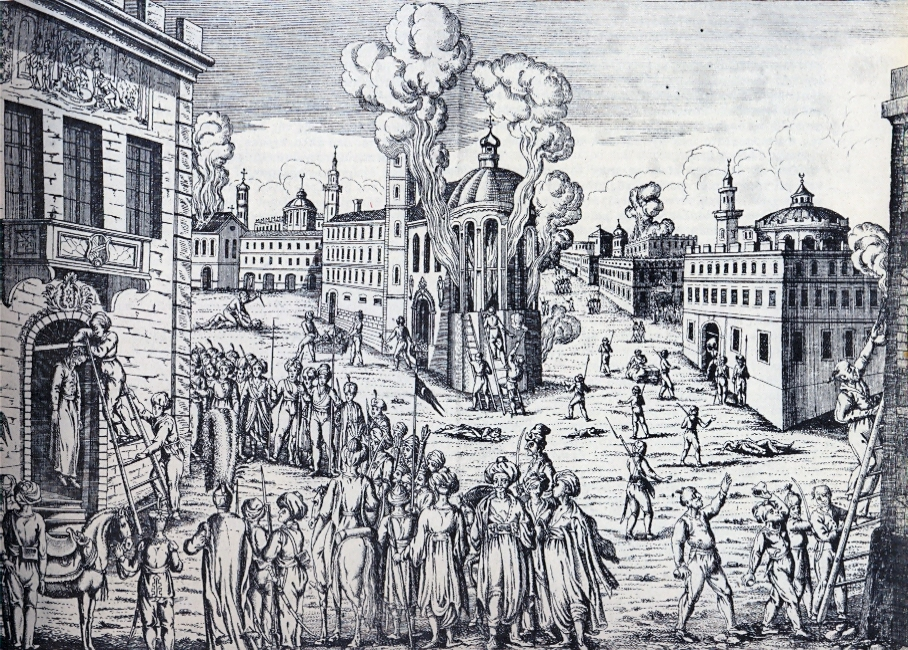
The Constantinople Massacre of April 1821: a religious persecution of the Greek population of Constantinople under the Ottomans. Patriarch Gregory V of Constantinople was executed.

In 2007, Metropolitan Alfeyev expressed the possibility of peaceful coexistence between Islam and Christianity in Russia, as the two religions have never had religious wars in Russia.

== Constituencies ==
The various autocephalous and autonomous synods of the Eastern Orthodox Church are distinct in terms of administration and local culture, but for the most part exist in full communion with one another. However, there have been varying instances in the history of the Eastern Orthodox Church where communion has been broken between member churches for short periods, particularly over autocephaly issues or disagreements over ecumenism with other Christian denominations. In addition, some schismatic churches not in any communion exist, with all three groups identifying as Eastern Orthodox.

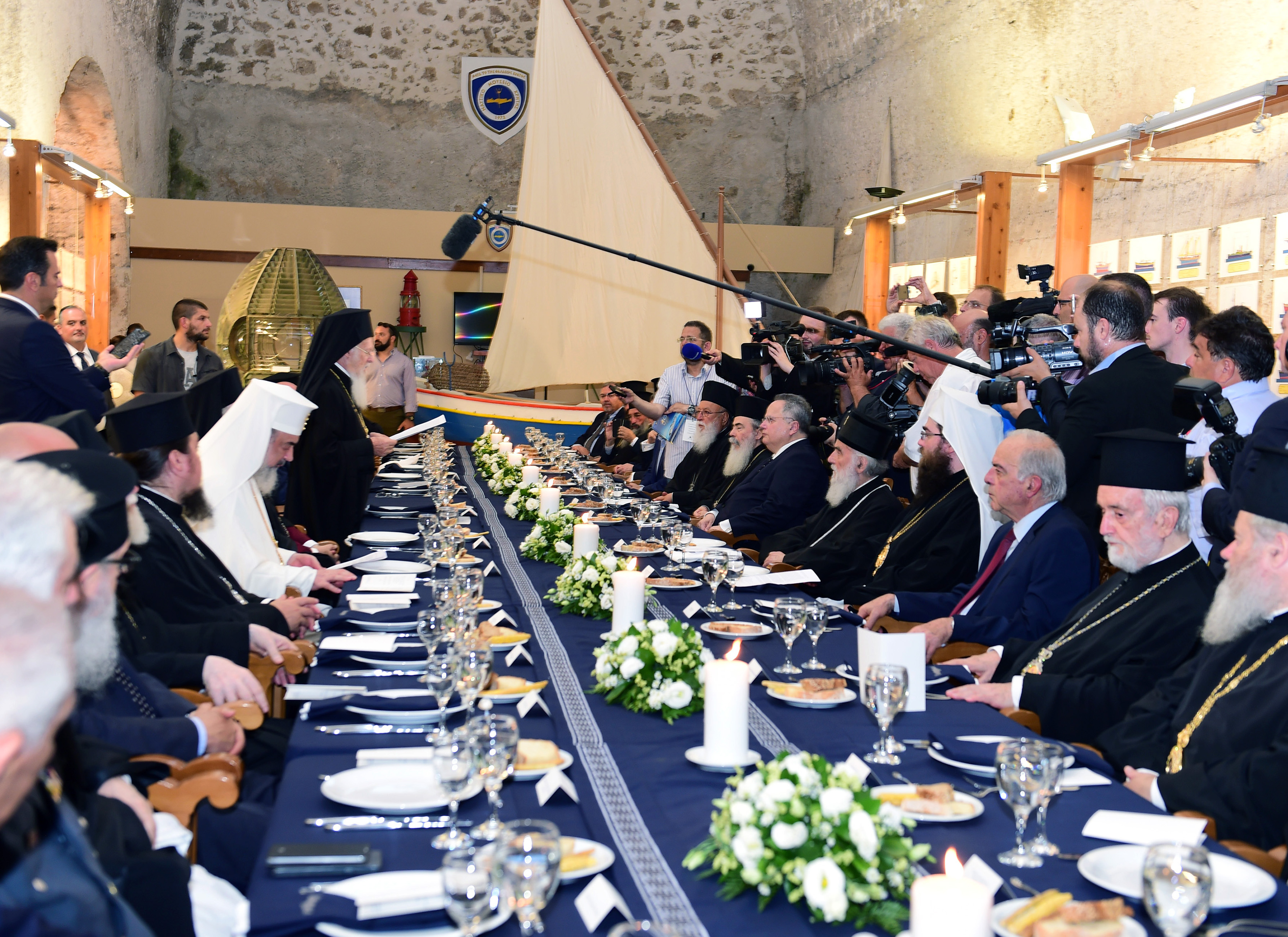
The Pan-Orthodox Council, Kolymvari, Crete, Greece, June 2016

Another group of non-mainstream Eastern Orthodox Christians are referred True Orthodoxy or Old Calendarists; they are those who, without authority from their parent churches, have continued to use the old Julian calendar, and split from their parent church.

The Russian Orthodox Church Outside Russia (ROCOR) has united in 2007 with the Moscow Patriarchate; these two churches had separated from each other in the 1920s due to the subjection of the latter to the hostile Soviet regime.

Another group, called the Old Believers, separated in 1666 from the official Russian Orthodox Church as a protest against church rite reforms introduced by Patriarch Nikon of Moscow.

=== Main communion ===
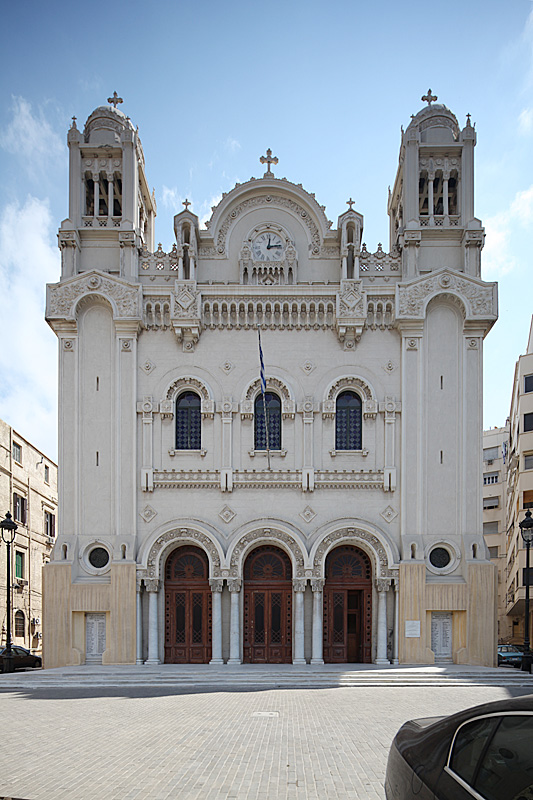
Cathedral of Evangelismos, Alexandria

The Eastern Orthodox Church is a communion of 15 autocephalous—that is, administratively completely independent—regional churches, plus the Orthodox Church in America and two Ukrainian Orthodox Churches. The Orthodox Church in America is recognised as autocephalous only by the Russian, Bulgarian, Georgian, Polish and Czech-Slovak churches. In December 2018, representatives of two unrecognised Ukrainian Orthodox churches, along with two metropolitans of the recognised, but self-declared autocephalous Ukrainian Orthodox Church of the Moscow Patriarchate, proclaimed the formation of the unified Orthodox Church of Ukraine. On 5 January 2019, the Orthodox Church of Ukraine received its tomos of autocephaly (decree which defines the conditions of a church's independence) from the Ecumenical Patriarchate and thus received a place in the diptych.

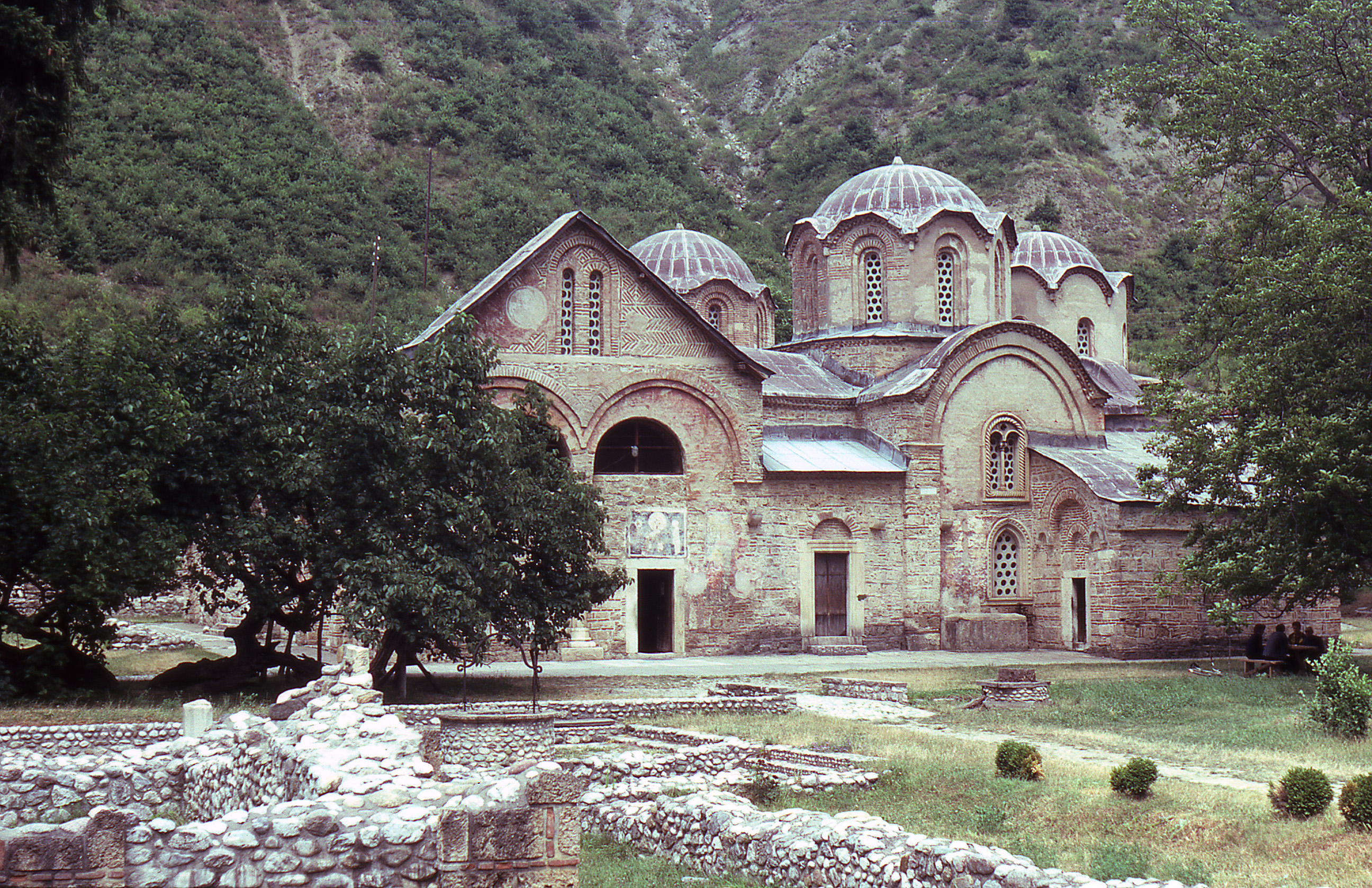
Patriarchate of Peć in Kosovo, the seat of the Serbian Orthodox Church from the 14th century, when its status was upgraded into a patriarchate

Each church has defined geographical boundaries of its jurisdiction and is ruled by its council of bishops or synod presided by a senior bishop–its primate (or first hierarch). The primate may carry the honorary title of patriarch, metropolitan (in the Slavic tradition) or archbishop (in the Greek tradition).

Each regional church consists of constituent eparchies (or dioceses) ruled by a bishop. Some churches have given an eparchy or group of eparchies varying degrees of autonomy (self-government). Such autonomous churches maintain varying levels of dependence on their mother church, usually defined in a tomos or other document of autonomy.

Below is a list of the 15 autocephalous Orthodox churches forming the main body of Orthodox Christianity, all of which are titled equal to each other, but the Ecumenical Patriarchate is titled the first among equals. Based on the definitions, the list is in the order of precedence and alphabetical order where necessary, with some of their constituent autonomous churches and exarchates listed as well. The liturgical title of the primate is in italics.

- Ecumenical Patriarchate of Constantinople (Archbishop of Constantinople-New Rome and First Among Equals Patriarch)
  - Autonomous Orthodox Church of Finland (Archbishop of Helsinki and All Finland, formerly Archbishop of Karelia and All Finland)
  - Self-governing Orthodox Church of Crete (Archbishop of Crete)
  - Self-governing monastic community of Mount Athos
  - Self-governing Orthodox Church of Korea (Metropolitan of Seoul and All Korea)
  - Exarchate of Lithuania
- Greek Orthodox Patriarchate of Alexandria (the Pope and Patriarch of the Great City of Alexandria, Libya, Pentapolis, Ethiopia, all the land of Egypt, and all Africa)
- Greek Orthodox Patriarchate of Antioch (Patriarch of Antioch and all the East)
  - Self-governing Archdiocese of North America (Metropolitan of North America and Archbishop of New York)
- Greek Orthodox Patriarchate of Jerusalem (Patriarch of the Holy City of Jerusalem and all Holy Land, Syria, Arabia, beyond the Jordan River, Cana of Galilee, and Sacred Zion)
  - Autonomous Church of Mount Sinai (Archbishop of Choreb, Sinai, and Raitha)
- Russian Orthodox Church (Patriarch of Moscow and all Russia)
  - Autonomous Orthodox Church in Japan (Archbishop of Tokyo and Metropolitan of All Japan)
  - Exarchate of Belarus (Metropolitan of Minsk and Slutsk, Patriarchal Exarch of All Belarus)
  - Self-governing Russian Orthodox Church Outside Russia (Metropolitan of Eastern America and New York, First Hierarch of the Russian church abroad)
- Serbian Orthodox Church (Archbishop of Peć, Metropolitan of Belgrade and Karlovci, and Serbian Patriarch)
- Bulgarian Orthodox Church (Metropolitan of Sofia and Patriarch of All Bulgaria)
- Romanian Orthodox Church (Archbishop of Bucharest, Metropolitan of Muntenia and Dobrudja, Locum Tenens of the Throne of Caesarea of Cappadocia, and Patriarch of Romania)
  - Autonomous Romanian Orthodox Metropolis of the Americas (Romanian Orthodox Archbishop of the United States of America and Romanian Orthodox Metropolitan of the Americas)
- Georgian Orthodox Church (Catholicos-Patriarch of All Georgia, the Archbishop of Mtskheta-Tbilisi and Metropolitan bishop of Abkhazia and Pitsunda)
- Church of Cyprus (Archbishop of New Justiniana and all Cyprus)
- Church of Greece (Archbishop of Athens and all Greece)
- Albanian Orthodox Church (Archbishop of Tirana, Durres and all Albania)
- Polish Orthodox Church (Metropolitan of Warsaw and all Poland or Archbishop of Warsaw and Metropolitan of All Poland) (Note: The primate of the Polish Orthodox Church is referred to as Archbishop of Warsaw and Metropolitan of All Poland, but the Polish Orthodox Church is officially a Metropolis)
- Orthodox Church of the Czech Lands and Slovakia (Archbishop of Prague, the Metropolitan of Czech lands and Slovakia or the Archbishop of Presov, the Metropolitan of Czech lands and Slovakia)
- Macedonian Orthodox Church – Ohrid Archbishopric (Metropolitan of Skopje and Archbishop of Ohrid and Macedonia and of Justiniana Prima)

Within the main body of Eastern Orthodoxy there are unresolved internal issues as to the autonomous or autocephalous status or legitimacy of the following Orthodox churches, particularly between those stemming from the Russian Orthodox or Constantinopolitan churches:

- Orthodox Church in America (Archbishop of Washington, Metropolitan of All America and Canada) – Autocephaly not recognised by the Ecumenical Patriarchate.
- Self-governing Estonian Apostolic Orthodox Church (Metropolitan of Tallinn and all Estonia) – Recognised only by the Ecumenical Patriarchate, opposed only by the Russian Orthodox Church.
- Self-governing Estonian Orthodox Church of the Moscow Patriarchate (Metropolitan of Tallinn and all Estonia) – Declared itself autocephalous in 2024; not recognised by the Ecumenical Patriarchate.
- Autonomous Bessarabian Orthodox Church in Moldova (Archbishop of Chișinău, Metropolitan of Bessarabia and Exarch of the Territories) of the Romanian Orthodox Church – Territory claimed by the Russian Orthodox Church.
- Autonomous Moldovan Orthodox Church (Metropolitan of Chișinău and all Moldova) of the Russian Orthodox Church – Jurisdiction disputed by the Romanian Orthodox Church.
- Orthodox Church of Ukraine (Metropolitan of Kyiv and All Ukraine) – Recognised by the Ecumenical Patriarchate, Church of Greece, Church of Cyprus, and Patriarchate of Alexandria as of October 2020, opposed by the Russian, Antiochian, Czech and Slovak, Serbian and Polish Orthodox Churches, and the Orthodox Church in America.
- Ukrainian Orthodox Church (Moscow Patriarchate), self-governing by declaration which later was approved and recognised by the Georgian Orthodox Church – jurisdiction disputed with the Orthodox Church of Ukraine, which nearly all Churches continued to recognise as part of ROC.
- Latvian Orthodox Church (Metropolitan of Riga and all Latvia) – holding autocephaly prior to 1941, forcibly integrated in 1941 as a result of the Soviet occupation and annexation of the Baltic states to become a self-governing part of the Russian Orthodox Church, with the Ecumenical Patriarchate accepting this situation in 1978; in 2022, the Latvian Parliament (the Saeima) declared the restoration of autocephaly of the LOC from the ROC, due to security reasons.

=== Traditionalist groups ===
==== True Orthodox ====
True Orthodoxy has been separated from the mainstream communion over issues of ecumenism and calendar reform since the 1920s. The movement rejects the Ecumenical Patriarchate of Constantinople, the Moscow Patriarchate, and all churches which are in communion with them, accusing them of heresy and placing themselves under bishops who do the same thing. They adhere to the use of the Julian calendar, claiming that the calendar reform in the 1920s is in contradiction with the ecumenical councils. There is no official communion of True Orthodox; and they often are local groups and are limited to a specific bishop or locality.

==== Old calendarists ====
Old Calendarists are traditionalist groups of Eastern Orthodox Christians that separated from mainstream Eastern Orthodox churches because some of the latter adopted the revised Julian calendar while Old Calendarists remained committed to the Julian calendar. Old Calendarists are not in communion with any mainstream Eastern Orthodox churches. "Old Calendarists" is another name for the True Orthodox movement in Romania, Bulgaria, Greece and Cyprus. In 1999, it was estimated that "[t]here are probably over one million Old Calendarists in Romania, somewhat fewer in Greece, and considerably fewer in Bulgaria, Cyprus, and the Eastern Orthodox diaspora."

==== Old Believers ====
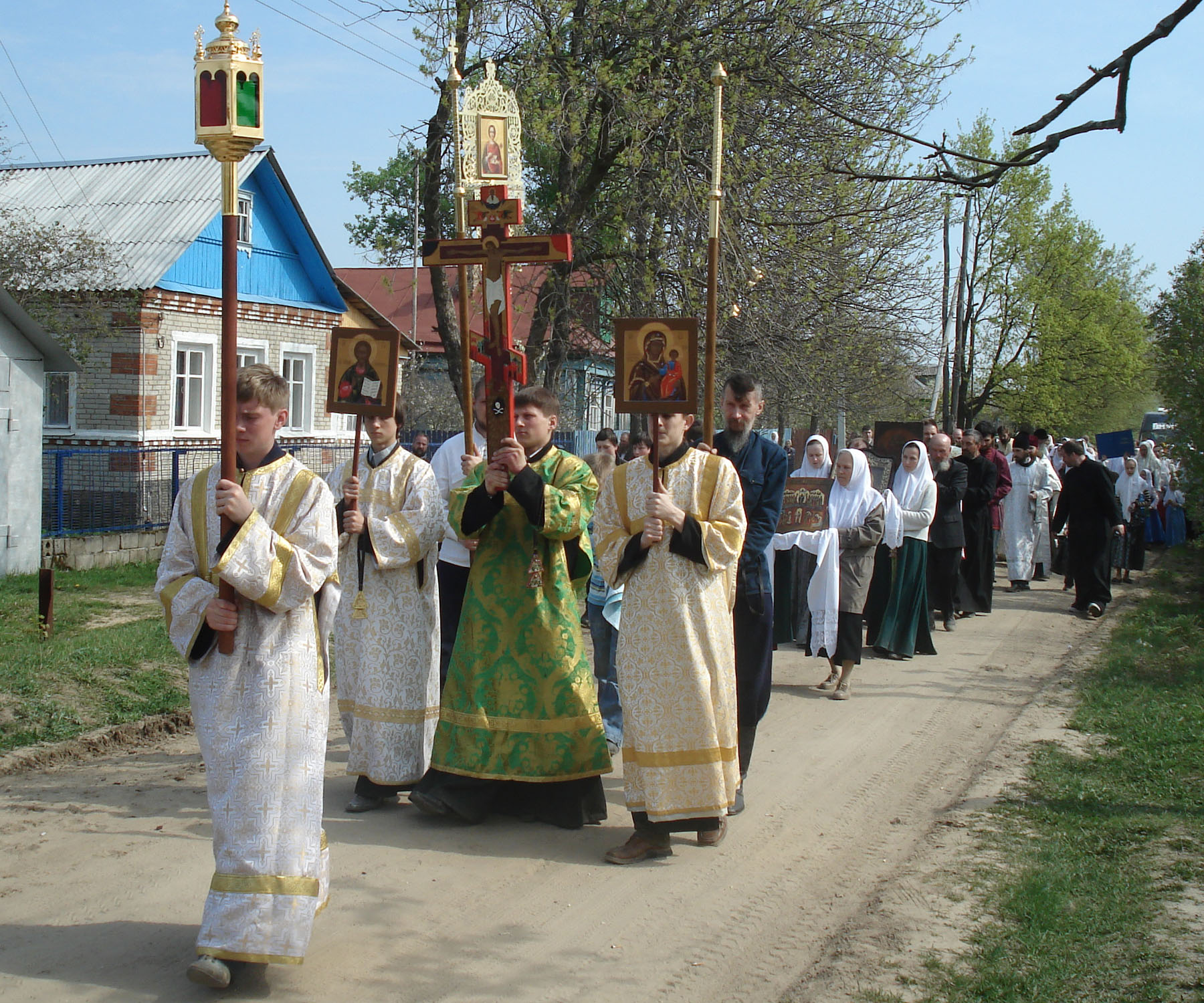
Traditional Paschal procession by Russian Orthodox Old-Rite Church

Old Believers are groups which do not accept the liturgical reforms which were carried out within the Russian Orthodox Church by Patriarch Nikon of Moscow in the 17th century. Although all of the groups of Old Believers emerged as a result of opposition to the Nikonian reforms, they do not constitute a single monolithic body. Despite their emphasis on invariable adherence to the pre-Nikonian traditions, the Old Believers feature a great diversity of groups which profess different interpretations of church tradition and they are often not in communion with each other (some groups even practise re-baptism before admitting a member of another group into their midst).

=== Churches not in communion with other churches ===
Churches existing with irregular or unresolved canonical status are entities that have carried out episcopal consecrations outside of the norms of canon law, or whose bishops have been excommunicated by one of the mainstream autocephalous churches. These include nationalist and other schismatic bodies such as the Abkhazian Orthodox Church and American Orthodox Catholic Church.

== See also ==
- Byzantine art
- Byzantine literature
- Byzantine dress
- Byzantine music
- Chalcedonian Christianity
- Ecclesiastical differences between the Catholic Church and the Eastern Orthodox Church
- Theological differences between the Catholic Church and the Eastern Orthodox Church
- Emanation (Eastern Orthodoxy)
- Greek Orthodox Christianity in Lebanon
- History of Christianity
- History of Christian theology
- History of Eastern Orthodox Christian theology
- Interparliamentary Assembly on Orthodoxy
- List of Eastern Orthodox churches in Australia
- List of Eastern Orthodox Christians
- Timeline of Orthodoxy in Greece (33–717)
- Timeline of autocephaly of Eastern Orthodox churches
