= Organization of the Eastern Orthodox Church =

The Eastern Orthodox Church, officially the Orthodox Catholic Church and commonly known simply as the Orthodox Church, is a communion composed of up to seventeen separate autocephalous (self-governing) hierarchical churches that profess Eastern Orthodoxy and recognise each other as canonical (regular) Eastern Orthodox Christian churches.

Each constituent church is self-governing; its highest-ranking bishop (known variously as a patriarch, metropolitan or archbishop) serves as the primate and reports to no higher authority. Each regional church is composed of constituent eparchies (or dioceses) ruled by bishops. Some autocephalous churches have given an eparchy or group of eparchies with varying degrees of autonomy (meaning they have limited self-government). Such autonomous churches maintain varying levels of dependence on their mother church, usually defined in a tomos or another document of autonomy. In many cases, autonomous churches are almost completely self-governing, with the mother church retaining only the right to appoint the highest-ranking bishop (often an archbishop or metropolitan) of the autonomous church.

Normal governance is enacted through a synod of bishops within each church.

== Church governance ==
The Eastern Orthodox Church is decentralised, having no central authority, earthly head or a single bishop in a leadership role. Thus, the Eastern Orthodox use a synodical system canonically, which is significantly different from the hierarchical organisation of the Roman Catholic Church that follows the doctrine of papal supremacy. References to the Ecumenical Patriarch of Constantinople as a sole authoritative leader are an erroneous interpretation of his title "first among equals". His title is of honor rather than full, supreme, immediate, and universal authority and in fact the Ecumenical Patriarch has no direct authority over churches other than his own eparchy in the city of Constantinople, while Patriarchate of Constantinople itself is governed in synodical manner. The Ecumenical Patriarch's unique role is sometimes referred to as being the "spiritual leader" of the Eastern Orthodox Church, although even this is disputed.

The autocephalous churches are normally in full communion with each other, so any priest of any of those churches may lawfully minister to any member of any of them, and no member of any is excluded from any form of worship in any of the others, including the reception of the Eucharist. However, there have been varying instances in the history of the Eastern Orthodox Church where communion has been broken between member churches for short periods, particularly over autocephaly issues or disagreements over ecumenism with other Christian denominations.

Following Justinian, the church existed only as a single denomination of five communing churches ruled by five patriarchs: the bishops of Rome, Constantinople, Alexandria, Antioch, and Jerusalem, collectively referred to as the Pentarchy. Each of the five patriarchs had jurisdiction over bishops in a specified geographic region which did not overlap with the jurisdiction of another patriarch. This continued until 927, when the Bulgarian Patriarchate became the first newly promoted patriarchate to join the original five.

Historically, the Patriarch of Rome was considered to be the "first in place of honor" among the five patriarchs. Disagreement about the limits of his authority was one of the causes of the Great Schism, conventionally dated to the year 1054, which split the previously unified Church into the Roman Catholic Church in the West, headed by the Pope, and the Orthodox Catholic Church (more commonly known today as the Eastern Orthodox Church), led by the four eastern patriarchs. After the schism, the honorary primacy of the Bishop of Rome shifted to the Patriarch of Constantinople, who had previously been accorded second-place rank at the First Council of Constantinople.

In the 5th century, Oriental Orthodoxy separated from Chalcedonian Christianity (and is therefore separate from both the Eastern Orthodox Church and Roman Catholic Church), well before the 11th century Great Schism. It should not be confused with Eastern Orthodoxy or Roman Catholicism.

== Jurisdictions ==
Canonical territories of the main autocephalous and autonomous Eastern Orthodox jurisdictions as of 2022

=== Autocephalous Eastern Orthodox churches ===
Timeline showing the history of the main autocephalous Eastern Orthodox Churches, from an Eastern Orthodox point of view, up to 2022

Ranked in order of seniority, with the year of independence (autocephaly) given in parentheses, where applicable. There are a total of 17 autocephalous Eastern Orthodox churches which are recognized to various degrees among the communion of the Eastern Orthodox Church.

Canonicity refers to the state of being in communion with the larger Eastern Orthodox Church (making the church in question undisputedly a constituent of the Eastern Orthodox Church), whereas autocephaly refers to the state of being more or less self-governing. Canonicity is binary (two churches are either in communion or not) while autocephaly exists on a spectrum. Disputes over autocephaly often lead to short-term breaks in communion for political reasons. These short-term breaks are typically not due to differences in doctrine or theology.

==== Four ancient patriarchates ====
1. Ecumenical Patriarchate of Constantinople (independence as archbishopric from Metropolis of Perinthus in AD 330; attained autocephaly in 381; elevated to Patriarchate and to second See in 451; automatically became the first See due to division from the See of Rome in the Great Schism of 1054)
2. Greek Orthodox Patriarchate of Alexandria
3. Greek Orthodox Patriarchate of Antioch
4. Greek Orthodox Patriarchate of Jerusalem (independence in AD 451, elevated to the rank of autocephalous patriarchate in 451)

The four ancient Eastern Orthodox patriarchates, along with the See of Rome, formed the historical Pentarchy, and remained in communion with each other after the East-West Schism in 1054. The concept of the Pentarchy and the title of "patriarch" itself, as opposed to archbishop or exarch, is attributed to Emperor Justinian in AD 531.

==== National patriarchates ====
1. Bulgarian Orthodox Church (870, patriarchate since 918/919, recognized by the Patriarchate of Constantinople in 927)
2. Georgian Orthodox Church (between 467-491, patriarchate since 1010)
3. Serbian Orthodox Church (1219, patriarchate since 1346)
4. Russian Orthodox Church (1448, recognized and patriarchate since 1589) (Note: Due to the 2018 Moscow–Constantinople schism, the Russian Orthodox Church has cut ties with the Ecumenical Patriarchate along with several primates of other Churches on this list. The nature of their current relationship is uncertain)
5. Romanian Orthodox Church (1872, recognized in 1885, patriarchate since 1925)

==== Autocephalous archbishoprics ====
Note: (Note: In the Orthodox Churches of Greek tradition, the ranks are, from the lowest to the highest, as follows: bishop, metropolitan, archbishop, patriarch. In contrast, in the other Eastern Orthodox Churches, the ranks are, from the lowest to the highest, as follows: bishop, archbishop, metropolitan, patriarch. Thus, an archbishop from an Eastern Orthodox Church of the Greek tradition is equivalent to a metropolitan in the other Eastern Orthodox Churches.)

1. Church of Cyprus (recognised in 431)
2. Church of Greece (1833, recognised in 1850)
3. Albanian Orthodox Church (1922, recognised in 1937)

==== Autocephalous metropoles ====
Note:

1. Polish Orthodox Church (1924) (Note: The primate of the Polish Orthodox Church is referred to as Archbishop of Warsaw and Metropolitan of All Poland, but the Polish Orthodox Church is officially a Metropolis)
2. Orthodox Church of the Czech Lands and Slovakia (1951) (Note: The primate of the Czech and Slovak Orthodox Church is referred to as Archbishop of Prešov and Slovakia, Metropolitan of the Czech Lands and Slovakia, but the Czech and Slovak Orthodox Church is officially a Metropolis)

=== Universally recognized as canonical, autocephaly disputed ===
1. Orthodox Church in America (granted by the Russian Orthodox Church in 1970 and recognized by five other churches, but not recognised by the Ecumenical Patriarchate or remaining churches; canonicity universally recognized) (Note: See Orthodox Church in America#Recognition of autocephaly)
2. Macedonian Orthodox Church (1967, granted by the Serbian Orthodox Church in 2022 and recognized by seven other churches, but not recognised by the Ecumenical Patriarchate or remaining churches; canonicity universally recognized)

=== Canonical and spiritual independence status disputed ===
1. Ukrainian Orthodox Church (Moscow Patriarchate) (1992 as Ukrainian Orthodox Church, split from Ukrainian Orthodox Church in 1992 allying with Russian Orthodox Church, declared independence from the Russian Orthodox Church on 27 May 2022, recognised as independent by the Georgian Orthodox Church on 24 March 2023. Its status as an independent church rejected by the majority of churches) (Note: As of 27 May 2022, the UOC has formally declared its full autonomy and independence from the Russian Orthodox Church, but did not declare itself autocephalous, while remaining in full communion with the Russian church, as well as with the Orthodox Churches of Antioch, Jerusalem, Serbia, Bulgaria, Romania, Albania, Poland, Czech Lands and Slovakia, and the OCA. However, in 24 March 2023, Georgia has recognised the UOC as an independent church.)
2. Latvian Orthodox Church (The LOC used to belong to the Russian Orthodox Church but Saeima declared it to be autocephalous in 2022.)
3. Estonian Christian Orthodox Church (Note: Autonomy not universally recognised.) (removed mentions of the Moscow Patriarchate on 20 August 2024, but no other church recognizes its independence)

=== Canonical and autocephalous status disputed ===
1. Orthodox Church of Ukraine (1992 as Ukrainian Orthodox Church, autocephaly from 15 December 2018, recognised by the Ecumenical Patriarchate on 5 January 2019 and three other churches. Its autocephaly and canonicity rejected by remaining churches, including its rival Ukrainian churches) (Note: See Orthodox Church of Ukraine#Reactions from Eastern Orthodox churches)

=== Canonical and autocephalous status unrecognised ===
1. A minority of the Ukrainian Orthodox Church – Kyiv Patriarchate formerly led by Filaret (Denysenko) split again in 2019, following internal disputes and concerns as to whether the autocephaly granted by the Ecumenical Patriarchate amounted to true autocephaly due to the conditions imposed. They are not recognized by any church, including rival Ukrainian churches.
2. The Old Calendarists and True Orthodox split from their local church and are not recognized as canonical, nor do they recognize any of the above churches as canonical. Some maintain communion with the Kyiv Patriarchate under Filaret.

== Internal ranking ==
The typical order that the four ancient churches appear in the diptychs is the same order given above. While every major church places the four ancient churches in their diptychs before the other autocephalous churches, this order may still differ slightly. For example, in the diptychs of the Russian Orthodox Church and some of its daughter churches (e.g., the Orthodox Church in America), the ranking of the five junior patriarchates is: Russia, Georgia, Serbia, Romania, Bulgaria. The ranking of the archbishoprics is the same, with the Church of Cyprus being the only ancient one (AD 431).

== Autonomous Eastern Orthodox churches ==
Under the Ecumenical Patriarchate of Constantinople

- Orthodox Church of Estonia (autonomy recognised by the Ecumenical Patriarchate but not by the Russian Orthodox Church)
- Orthodox Church of Finland

Under the Greek Orthodox Church of Antioch

- Antiochian Orthodox Christian Archdiocese of North America
- Antiochian Orthodox Archdiocese of São Paulo and All Brazil

Under the Greek Orthodox Church of Jerusalem

- Church of Sinai

Under the Russian Orthodox Church

- Belarusian Orthodox Church
- Metropolis of Chișinău and All Moldova
- Orthodox Church in Japan (autonomy recognised by the Russian Orthodox Church but not by the Ecumenical Patriarchate)
- Chinese Orthodox Church (autonomy recognised by the Russian Orthodox Church but not by the Ecumenical Patriarchate)

Under the Romanian Orthodox Church

- Metropolis of Bessarabia
- Romanian Orthodox Metropolis of the Americas
- Romanian Orthodox Metropolis of Western and Southern Europe

=== Semi-autonomous churches ===
Under the Ecumenical Patriarchate of Constantinople

- Church of Crete

Under the Russian Orthodox Church

- Russian Orthodox Church Outside Russia

=== Limited self-government (not autonomy) ===
Under the Ecumenical Patriarchate of Constantinople

- Monastic community of Mount Athos
- Greek Orthodox Archdiocese of Italy and Malta
- Korean Orthodox Church
- Exarchate of the Philippines
- Exarchate of Lithuania
- American Carpatho-Russian Orthodox Diocese
- Ukrainian Orthodox Church of Canada
- Ukrainian Orthodox Church of the USA

Under the Russian Orthodox Church

- Archdiocese of Russian Orthodox churches in Western Europe
- Diocese of Korea (Russian Orthodox Church)
- Korean Orthodox Committee (nl)

Under the Romanian Orthodox Church

- Ukrainian Orthodox Vicariate Sighetu Marmației

== Unrecognised churches ==
Timeline of the main unrecognised and True Orthodox churches which have come out of the Serbian Orthodox Church, until 2022

=== Churches that are not recognised despite wanting to ===
The following churches recognize all other mainstream Eastern Orthodox churches, but are not recognised by any of them due to various disputes:

- Abkhazian Orthodox Church
- Holy Metropolis of Abkhazia
- American Orthodox Catholic Church
- Belarusian Autocephalous Orthodox Church
- Autocephalous Orthodox Church of Kosovo
- Montenegrin Orthodox Church
- Turkish Orthodox Church
- Ukrainian Autocephalous Orthodox Church Canonical
- Ukrainian Orthodox Church – Kyiv Patriarchate (Note: The UOC-KP merged into the Orthodox Church of Ukraine. However, the UOC-KP was re-established after a conflict between Patriarch Filaret and the primate of the OCU Metropolitan Epiphanius)

=== True Orthodox ===
Timeline of the main unrecognised and True Orthodox churches which have come out of the Russian Orthodox Church, until 2021

True Orthodox Christians are groups of traditionalist Eastern Orthodox churches which have severed communion since the 1920s with the mainstream Eastern Orthodox churches for various reasons, such as calendar reform, the involvement of mainstream Eastern Orthodox in ecumenism, or the refusal to submit to the authority of mainstream Eastern Orthodox Church. The True Orthodox Church in the Soviet Union was also called the Catacomb Church; the True Orthodox in Romania, Bulgaria, Greece and Cyprus are also called Old Calendarists.

These groups refrain from concelebration of the Divine Liturgy with the mainstream Eastern Orthodox, while maintaining that they remain fully within the canonical boundaries of the Church: i.e., professing Eastern Orthodox belief, retaining legitimate apostolic succession, and existing in communities with historical continuity.

The churches which follow True Orthodoxy are:

- Old Calendarists (numerous groups)
- Serbian True Orthodox Church
- Russian True Orthodox Church (Lazar Zhurbenko)
- Russian Orthodox Autonomous Church
  - Latvian Orthodox Autonomous Church (Note: Claims to be part of the Ecumenical Patriarchate)
- True Orthodox Metropolis of Germany and Europe (Note: Was previously an Oriental Orthodox archdiocese by the Indian Orthodox Church and later an independent Oriental Orthodox Church; the Church is currently an autonomous True Orthodox Church under the Avlona Synod since 2016)
- Macedonian True Orthodox Church

=== Old Believers ===
Old Believers are divided into various churches which recognize neither each other nor the mainstream Eastern Orthodox Church.

=== Churches that are neither recognised nor fully Eastern Orthodox ===
The following churches use the term "Orthodox" in their name and carry belief or the traditions of the Eastern Orthodox Church, but blend beliefs and traditions from other denominations outside of Eastern Orthodoxy:

- Evangelical Orthodox Church (blends with Protestant Evangelicalism and the Charismatic movement)
- Orthodox-Catholic Church of America (blends with Roman Catholic and Oriental Orthodox elements)
- Lusitanian Catholic Orthodox Church (blends with Catholic elements)
- Celtic Orthodox Church
- Orthodox Church of the Gauls

== See also ==
- Hierarchy of the Catholic Church
  - Catholic Church by country
- List of Lutheran dioceses and archdioceses
