= Autonomous Orthodox Metropolia of North and South America and the British Isles =

True Orthodox jurisdiction

- Official logo of the Metropolia
- Type: Eastern Orthodox
- Orientation: True Orthodox (self-declared)
- Polity: Episcopal

The Autonomous Orthodox Metropolia of North and South America and the British Isles is a True Orthodox denomination.

== Doctrine ==
The metropolia states that it is True Orthodox in doctrine.

== History ==
=== Background ===
The Autonomous Metropolia claims to trace its roots back to a formation of the Patriarch of Moscow in the early 20th century.

The Autonomous Metropolia broke ties with the Moscow Patriarchate and placed itself under the omophorion first of the Ukrainian Orthodox Church, then of Archbishop Auxentios of Athens the primate of the True Orthodox Church of Greece. The group then formed an Archdiocese subject to Metropolitan Evlogios Hessler of the Holy Synod of Milan.

=== Creation and independence ===
The Metropolia was granted self-governance by the Holy Synod of Milan by a tomos in 2011, which created the Autonomous Orthodox Metropolia of North and South America and the British Isles. This was followed by an attempt the same year by the Holy Synod of Milan to unite with the Moscow Patriarchate; thus, the Holy Synod of Milan broke communion with the other synods it was then in communion with.

The Metropolia states that it severed communion with the Holy Synod of Milan, because the Holy Synod of Milan "broke communion with her sister churches, over her desire to unite with the World Orthodox Patriarchate of Moscow, which has been condemned by the former Sister Synods in America, Greece, Bulgaria, and Russia. As such, the new Metropolia no longer maintains communion with the 'Milan' Synod of Europe, and considers her sister Church to have fallen away until such time as she repents of her errors".

The Metropolia stated in 2011 that unlike the Holy Synod of Milan, the now independent Metropolia maintained communion with the Church of the Genuine Orthodox Christians of Greece of the Patristic Calendar (an Old Calendarist group), the Old Calendar Bulgarian Orthodox Church, and the Russian True Orthodox Church of Metropolitan Raphael.

== Relationships with other jurisdictions ==
The Metropolia is a member of the IUGOC (International Union of Genuine Orthodox Churches).

The Metropolia has a dedicated committee for inter-True Orthodox relations, which namely seeks to initiate dialogue between the bishops of the former Synod in Resistance, and beyond, concerning matters of ecclesiology and grace in mainstream Eastern Orthodoxy.

== Structure ==
The First-Hierarch of the Metropolia is Metropolitan John (LoBue) of North and South America.
