= Church of St Edward the Martyr, Brookwood =

Church in Brookwood, Surrey, England

Church of St. Edward the Martyr
- St. Edward the Martyr Orthodox Church
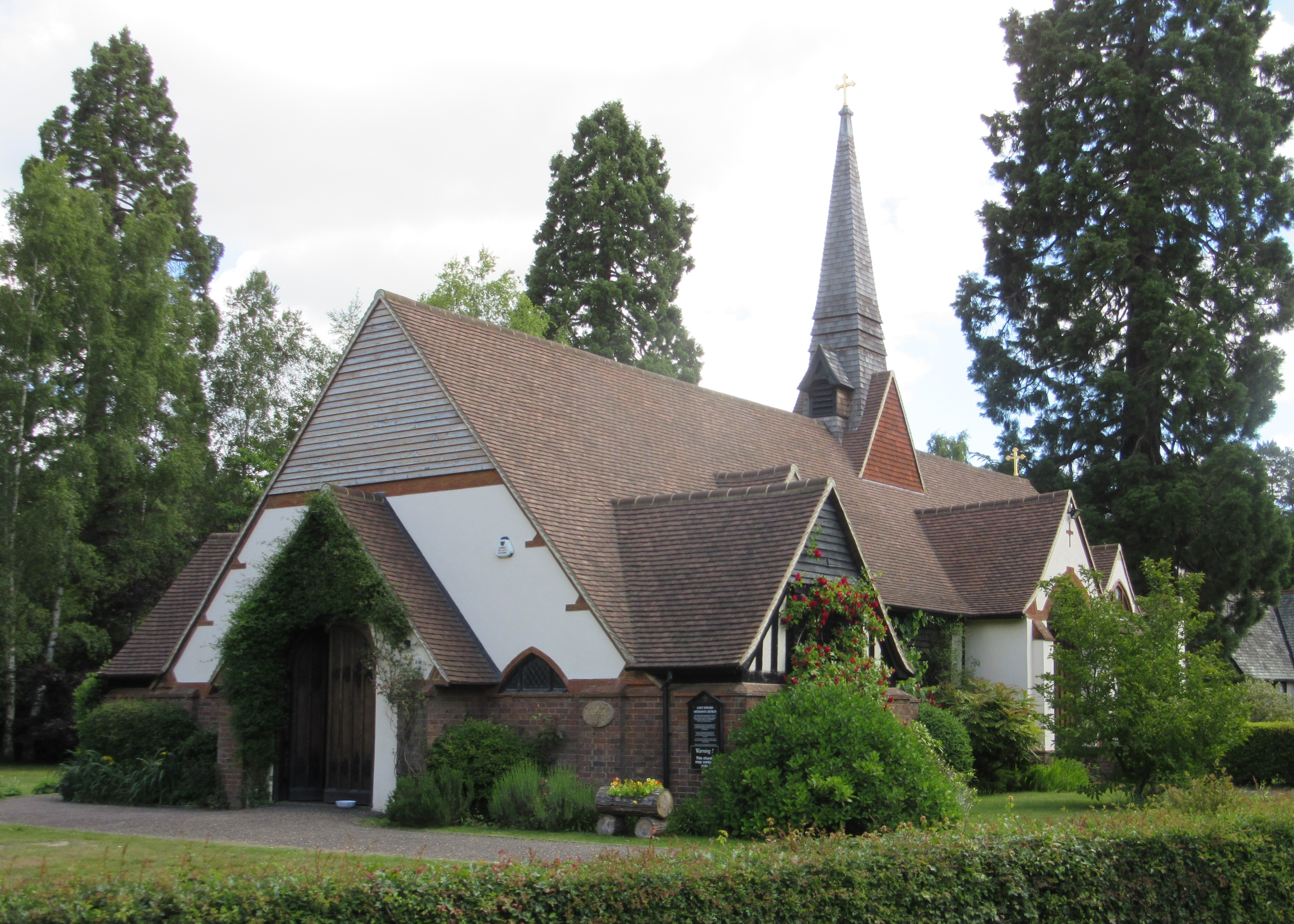
- The church from the southwest
- Church of St. Edward the Martyr
- 51.2995°N 0.6241°W
- OS grid reference: SU9591256552
- Country: England
- Language(s): English (chiefly), Greek, Church Slavonic, Romanian
- Denomination: Church of the Genuine Orthodox Christians of Greece (since 2014)
- Previous denomination: Orthodox Church of Greece (Holy Synod in Resistance) (2007-2014); Russian Orthodox Church Outside Russia (1982-2007); Church of England
- Tradition: True Orthodoxy
- Religious order: Saint Edward Brotherhood
- Website: saintedwardbrotherhood.org

Architecture
- Architect(s): Cyril Tubbs, Arthur Messer
- Completed: 1909

St. Edward the Martyr Orthodox Church is a True Orthodox Church in Brookwood, Surrey, England. It houses the relics of Saint Edward the Martyr, the murdered king of England.

== History ==
In 1982, the monastic Saint Edward Brotherhood was established at Brookwood Cemetery in order to develop and care for a new church in which the relics of Saint Edward the Martyr would be eventually enshrined. The group was founded within the Russian Orthodox Church Outside of Russia (ROCOR), which had recently acquired the relics of St. Edward.

ROCOR had gotten the relics from John Wilson-Claridge, who had exhumed the bones of the saint in 1931. Claridge had wanted the bones to be enshrined as relics by a church, but had his offer rejected by various Anglican bishops. Eventually, ROCOR was given the relics, on the condition that they revere them. Following this, ROCOR founded the Saint Edward Brotherhood.

The group purchased land and an old Anglican church in Brookwood, at a final cost of $100,000. The location is part of a grade I landscape, with the church having been designed by Cyril Tubbs and Arthur Messer and completed in about 1909. The church was renamed the St. Edward the Martyr Orthodox Church, and the Brotherhood began performing Orthodox services there in March 1982. The relics of St. Edward were enshrined at the church on September 16, 1984. This came after litigation from John Wilson-Claridge's brother, Geoffrey, who unsuccessfully tried to dispute his brother's ownership of the relics in order to prevent the church from housing them.

On 31 March 2001, a special service was conducted at the church to honor the one-thousandth anniversary of St. Edward's glorification. The service was led by Archbishop Mark, the leader of ROCOR within the British Isles.

St. Edward's left ROCOR in 2007 over its disagreement with the denomination's reunification with the Moscow Patriarchate. It then joined the Orthodox Church of Greece (Holy Synod in Resistance), a True Orthodox group. In 2014, that jurisdiction became part of the Church of the Genuine Orthodox Christians of Greece, and this is the jurisdiction which St. Edward's belongs to today.

== Organization ==
The church is composed of two communities. The first is the Saint Edward Brotherhood, a monastic community who chant the services of the church daily at the shrine. The second are the True Orthodox Christians who form a mission parish there. These Christians supplement the congregation on Sundays and feast days.

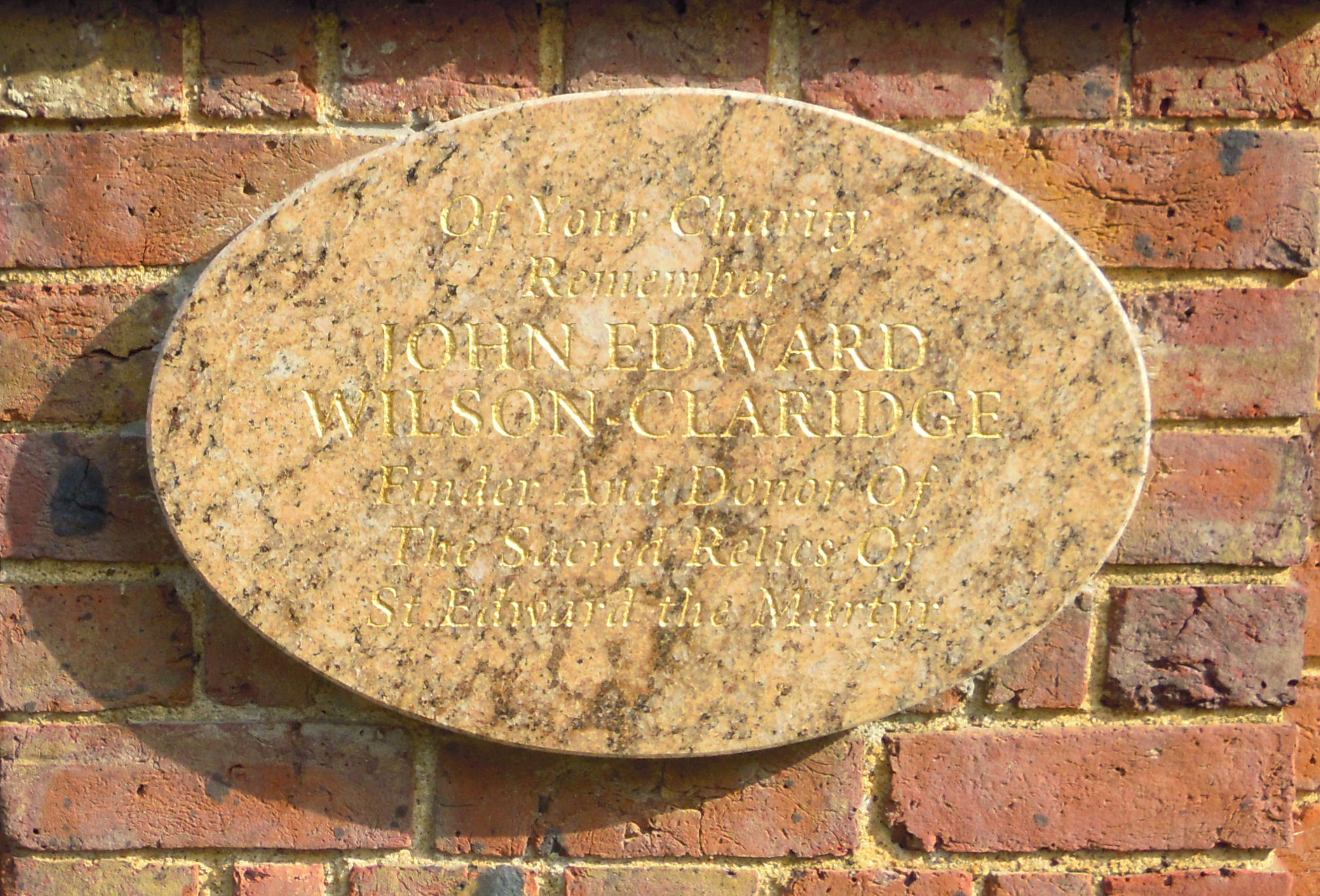
Plaque on the exterior wall to John Edward Wilson-Claridge, who recovered the remains of Edward the Martyr

== Transport links ==
Rail

The church is 600 metres (2,000 ft) south-east of Brookwood railway station via a main path.

Road

The church is 10 kilometres (6 mi) south of Junction 3 of the M3 and is close to the gates of the country's largest cemetery, on the A322 road.

== Gallery ==
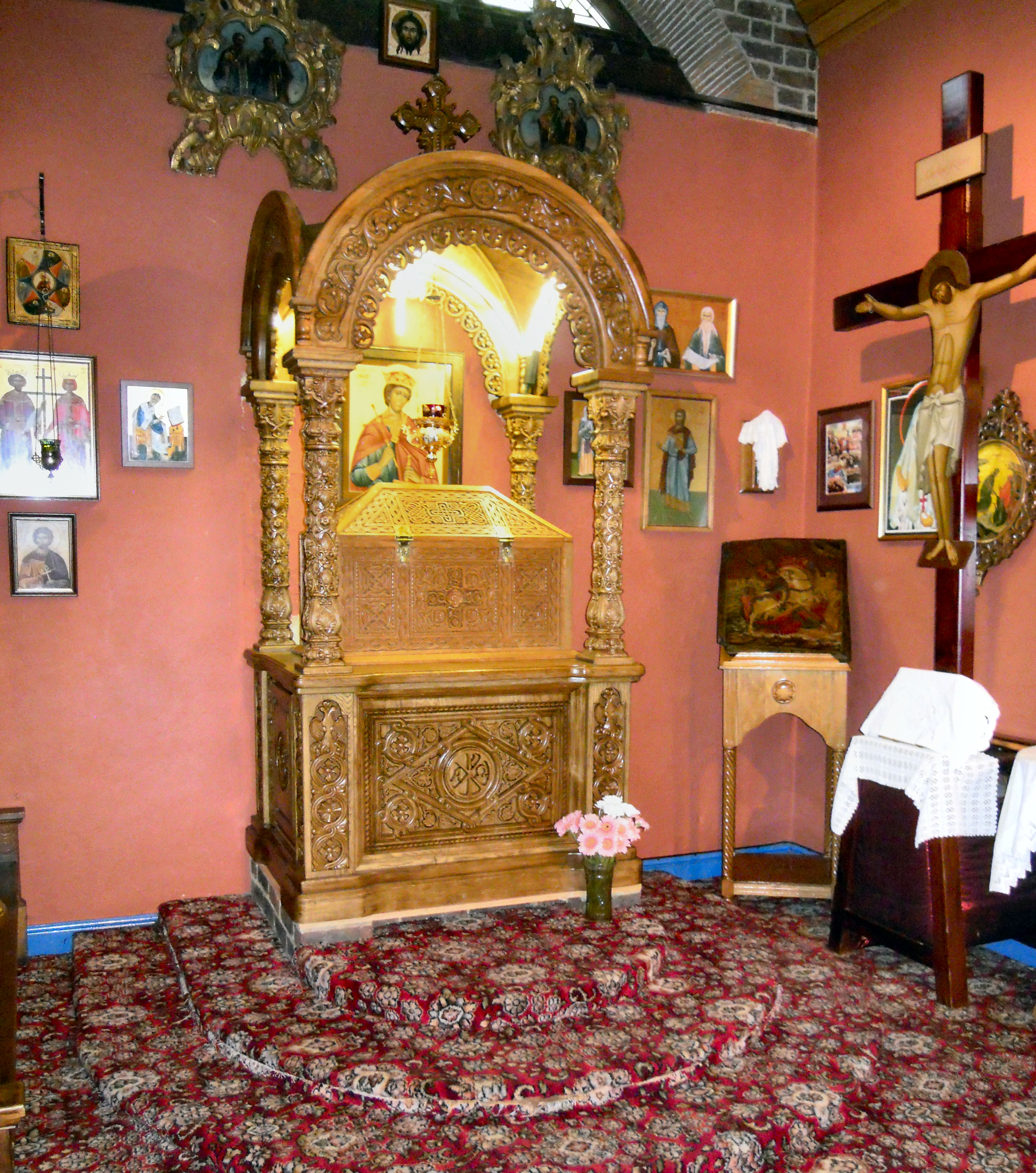
The Shrine of St Edward the Martyr

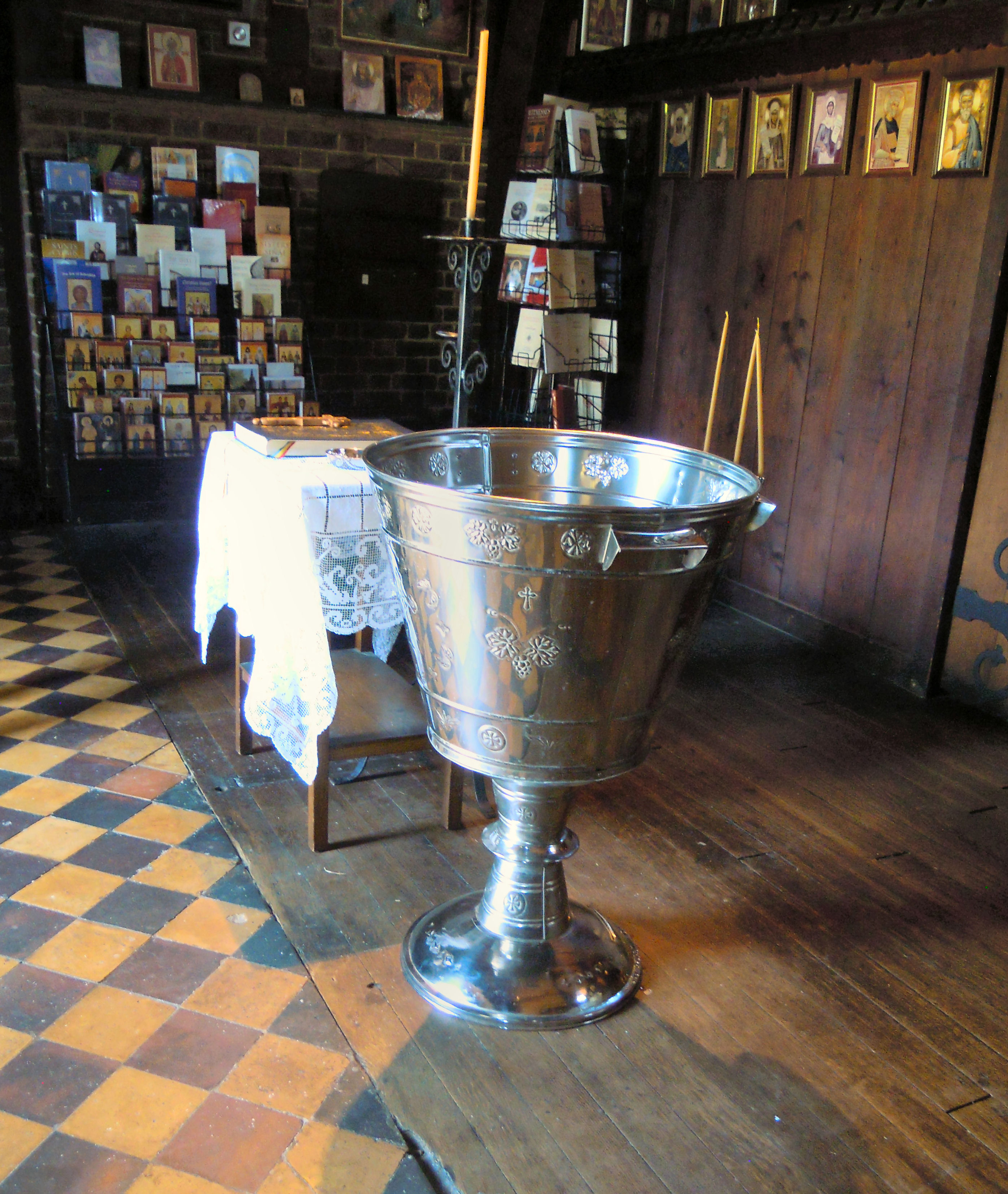
The baptismal font

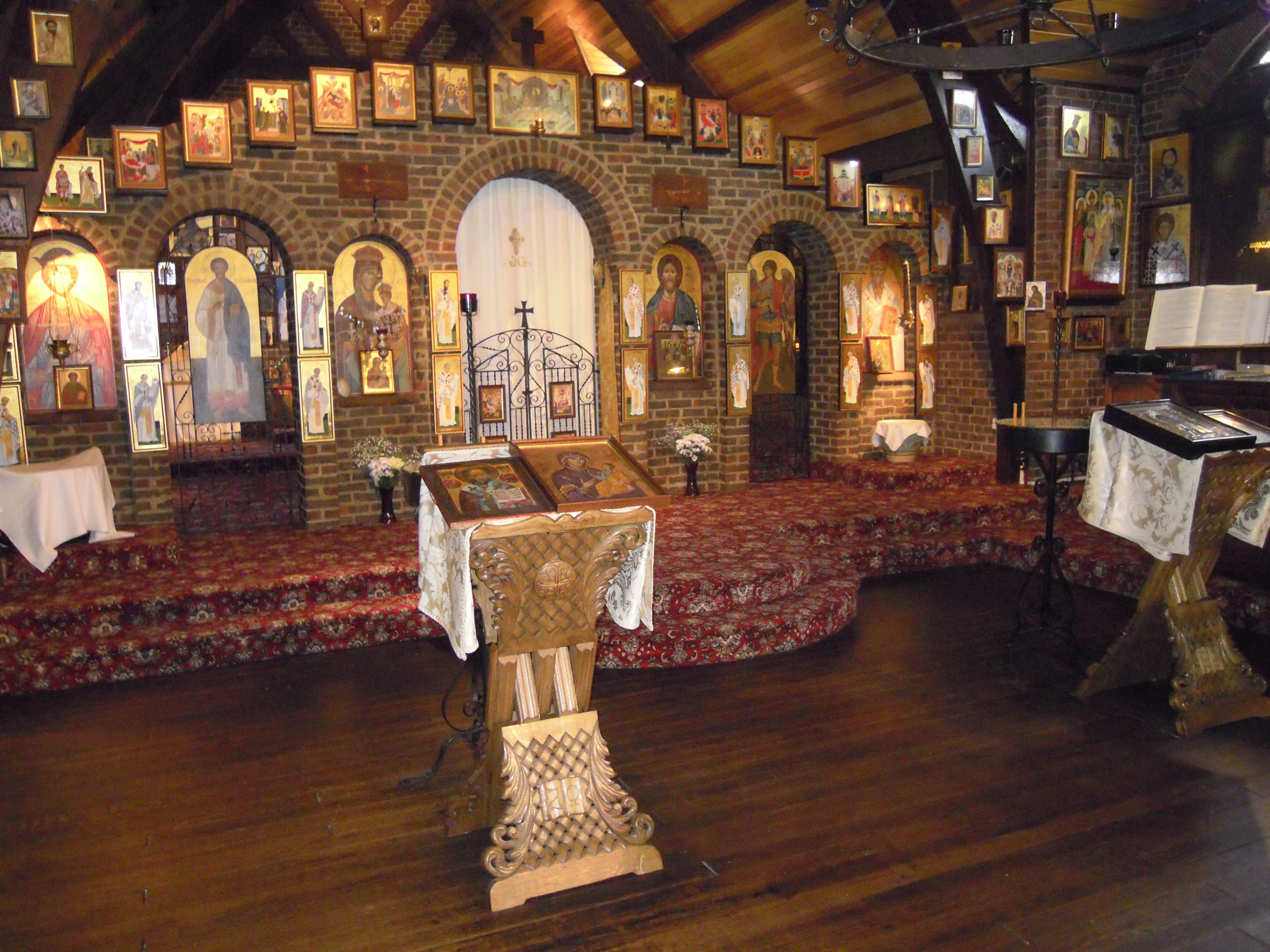
The iconostasis
