= True Orthodox church =

Movement within Eastern Orthodox Christianity

True Orthodox church, True Orthodox Christians, True Orthodoxy or Genuine Orthodoxy, often pejoratively "Zealotry", are groups of traditionalist Eastern Orthodox churches which since the 1920s have severed communion with the mainstream Eastern Orthodox churches for various reasons, such as calendar reform, the involvement of mainstream Eastern Orthodox churches in ecumenism, or the refusal to submit to the authority of mainstream Eastern Orthodox churches. The True Orthodox church in the Soviet Union was also called the Catacomb Church; the True Orthodox in Romania, Bulgaria, Greece and Cyprus are usually called Old Calendarists.

== History ==
The reformed church calendar was adopted by the mainstream Eastern Orthodox churches of Greece and Romania in 1924. At the moment of this adoption, True Orthodoxy began as Old Calendarism. True Orthodox were only laypeople and monks until 1935, when three bishops of the Church of Greece joined the movement in Greece. In 1955, one bishop of the Romanian Orthodox Church joined the movement in Romania. In the Soviet Union, the True Orthodox began in 1927-8 when some Eastern Orthodox Christians, among whom were some "senior and respected bishops", severed communion with the Moscow Patriarchate.

The True Orthodox movement remained united in Romania. However, in Greece in 1937 the Greek Old Calendarists "divided"; the reason for their division was a disagreement on whether the sacraments performed by members of churches which have adopted the reformed calendar are valid or not.

In 1971, the Russian Orthodox Church Outside of Russia (ROCOR) tried to unite the factions of Greek Old Calendarists, but failed. In 1999, the most important groups of Greek Old Calendarists were the Chrysostomites, the Matthewites, and the Cyprianites.

After the ROCOR opened its first parishes in 1990 in Russia, many Christians from the Catacomb Church joined them. Since 2000, the prospect of reconciliation of ROCOR with the Moscow Patriarchate aroused opposition from traditionalists opposed to union with a church tied to the Soviet and post-Soviet regimes ruling Russia. Several churches descending from factions which rejected the 2007 reunion were formed; sometimes with more churches separating from the original schismatic churches.

== Doctrine ==
The True Orthodox churches are "fully [Eastern] Orthodox in dogma and ritual". Ecumenism and calendar reform are frequently points of contention with the mainstream Eastern Orthodox Church.

== Denominations ==
Timeline of the main Greek Old Calendarist and True Orthodox churches, until 2021

Timeline of some of the Russian True Orthodox churches, until 2021

Timeline of the main True Orthodox churches which came out of the Serbian Orthodox Church, until 2022

There is no single denomination nor organization called the "True Orthodox Church" nor is there official recognition among the "True Orthodox" as to who is properly included among them.

Denominations that are usually included in "True Orthodoxy" are:

- Old Calendarists
  - Greek Old Calendarists
    - Church of the Genuine Orthodox Christians of Greece (Chrysostomos Synod)
      - Eparchy of Alania
    - Church of the Genuine Orthodox Christians of Greece (Matthew Synod)
    - Holy Synod of Milan
    - Autonomous Orthodox Metropolia of North and South America and the British Isles
    - Autonomous Orthodox Metropolis of Ecuador and Latin America
    - True Orthodox Metropolis of Germany and Europe
  - Old Calendar Bulgarian Orthodox Church
  - Old Calendarist Romanian Orthodox Church
- Thirteen denominations descending from the Russian Orthodox Church Outside Russia (unless otherwise stated, subpoints indicate a schism from the above church)
  - Russian Orthodox Autonomous Church
    - Latvian Orthodox Autonomous Church (autonomous church within ROAC)
  - ROCOR (V) — church under the omophorion of Metropolitan Vitaly (Ustinov)
    - Russian True Orthodox Church — church under the omophorion of Archbishop Lazar (Zhurbenko)
      - ROCOR (S) — church under the omophorion of Bishop Stephen (Sabelnik)
    - ROCOR (V-A) — church under the omophorion of Metropolitan Anthony (Orlov). It has split into several autocephalous communities.
    - ROCOR (V-V) — church under the omophorion of Archbishop Vladimir (Tselishchev)
      - ROCOR (V-F) — church under the omophorion of Metropolitan Philaret (Semovskikh)
        - ROCOR (V-M) — church under the omophorion of Archbishop Martin (Lapkovsky)
        - ROCOR (V-F(R)) — church under the omophorion of Metropolitan Philaret (Rozhnov)
    - ROCOR (M) or the True Orthodox Church of Moldova — church under the omophorion of Archbishop Anthony (Rudea)
  - ROCOR (A) — church under the omophorion of Metropolitan Agafangel (Pashkovsky)
    - ROCOR (ASAD) — church under the omophorion of a conference of four schismatic bishops
- Archdiocese of the Goths and the Northlands
- True Russian Orthodox Church
- Serbian True Orthodox Church
- Macedonian True Orthodox Church

== Inter-church relations and intercommunion ==
The Russian Orthodox Autonomous Church (ROAC) through the late Metropolitan Valentine, stated informally that they no longer actively seek to join other True Orthodox churches, but would not refuse incoming dialogue.

== Demography ==
In 1999, it was estimated that "[t]here are probably over one million Old Calendarists in Romania, somewhat fewer in Greece, and considerably fewer in Bulgaria, Cyprus, and the [Eastern Orthodox] diaspora."

Those who consider themselves a part of this movement are a small minority of those who consider themselves to be Eastern Orthodox Christians.

== See also ==
- Ancient Church of the East — an East Syriac Church, founded in 1968 after a split from the Assyrian Church of the East for similar reasons
- Christian fundamentalism
- Old Believers — A collective group of independent Russian Orthodox Christians who maintain the liturgical and ritual practices of the Eastern Orthodox Church as they existed prior to the reforms of Patriarch Nikon of Moscow between 1652 and 1666
- Old Catholicism — Catholics who rejected the First Vatican Council, who usually recognize the Bishop of Rome as a valid bishop but reject his claims of universal jurisdiction
- Traditionalist Catholicism — Catholics who object to the reforms of the Second Vatican Council, sometimes embracing sedevacantism
- Independent sacramental movement
