= Religion in South Ossetia =

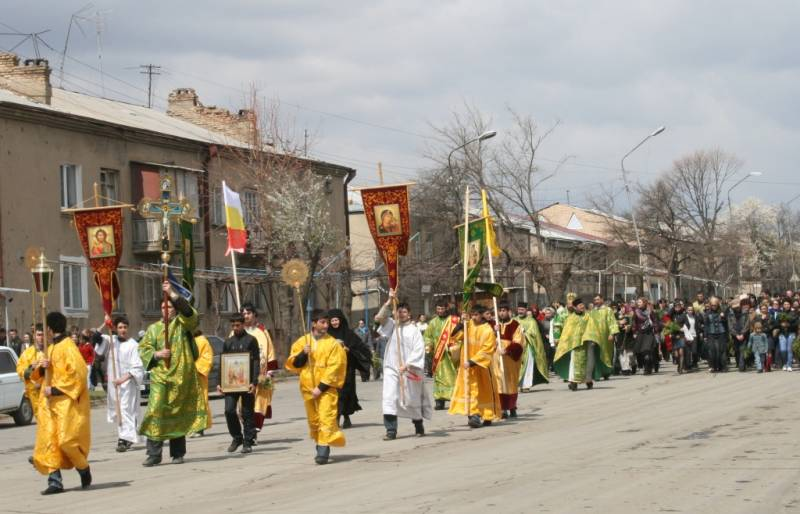
Palm Sunday procession in Tskhinvali

South Ossetia, a partially-recognized de facto state in the Caucasus and internationally considered part of Georgia, is primarily Eastern Orthodox Christian. A significant minority are adherents of the Ossetian traditional religion, Uatsdin, which is polytheistic and has origins in ancient Scythian religion. Syncretism between Christianity and traditional belief is common.

Christianity in South Ossetia was first introduced through Byzantine influence over the Alans, although the population continued to practice traditional religion, reverting fully to paganism by the late Middle Ages. Russian and Georgian missionaries evangelized in the region in the 18th and 19th centuries, but religion was repressed during the Soviet period. An Ossetian nationalist religious revival was initiated in the 1990s, and the Orthodox Church in South Ossetia declared its independence from the Georgian Orthodox Church. The South Ossetian Orthodox Church aligns with the Old Calendarist movement; it is considered schismatic from the mainstream Orthodox Church.

Uatsdin, also practiced in North Ossetia, is a prominent minority faith in South Ossetia. It reflects the Iranian origins of the Ossetians, as well as later Christian influence. As the Ossetians were never fully converted to Christianity, Ossetian traditional religion has remained visible in South Ossetian society.

The capital of South Ossetia, Tskhinvali, historically had a large Jewish population, outnumbering the Georgians and Ossetians at some points. The community declined throughout the Soviet period, and by the 1990s, the vast majority of the Jews in South Ossetia had emigrated, mainly to Russia and Israel.

== Demographics ==
Tiri Monastery, a medieval Georgian monastery near Tskhinvali

South Ossetia is mostly ethnically Ossetian, with minorities of Georgians. The majority of Ossetians are Orthodox Christians, and the Orthodox Church remains a prominent aspect of South Ossetian society. Traditional pagan elements are often syncretized with Orthodox Christianity. The number of practitioners of Ossetian traditional religion is difficult to estimate, but it is a significant portion of the population. Unlike in North Ossetia, where Muslims form a significant minority, Islam is absent from South Ossetia. Many ethnic Ossetians who identify as Christian or Uatsdin participate in traditional values and rituals, and throughout North and South Ossetia, popular practice of folk religion exceeds that in churches.

== History ==
=== Christianity ===
South Ossetia, like Abkhazia, has historically fallen between the ecclesiastical jurisdictions of the Russian Orthodox Church and the Georgian Orthodox Church. Both the Russian Church (through its Georgian exarchate) and Georgian Church have had historic presences in South Ossetia, and the people of the region were Christianized under the influence of both churches. In the 10th century, the Alans (ancestors of the Ossetians) nominally converted to Christianity through Byzantine influence, but the population largely continued practicing traditional ethnic religion. The Tsarist regime sent its first mission to the Ossetians in 1744, which was organized to be hidden from the Ottoman Empire and Persian authorities; only Georgian priests were sent to evangelize. The Orthodox missionaries found somewhat limited success in their mission to convert the Ossetians, and the process ended after the Bolshevik Revolution.

During the Soviet period, religious practice declined as the South Ossetians were Sovietized, and the Georgian Church neglected the South Ossetian Autonomous Oblast. There were no active churches in South Ossetia during the Soviet period; during perestroika, one church was founded near Nikozi (in Georgia proper) to serve ethnic Georgians from South Ossetia.

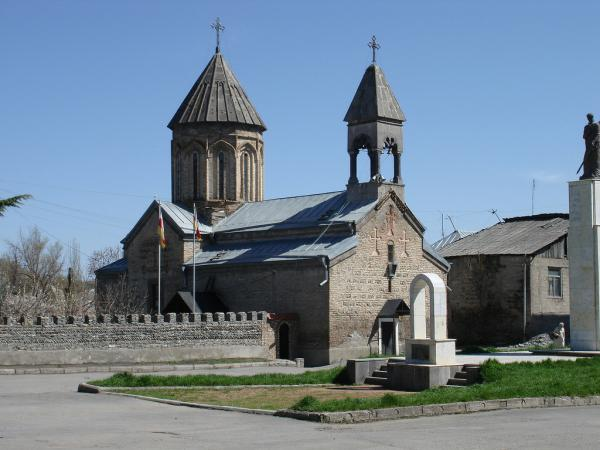
St. Mary's Church, an Armenian Apostolic church in Tskhinvali

From 1990, a religious revival with nationalist overtones took place in the region, led by Aleksandr Pukhate, which aimed to separate from the Georgian Church. In 1992 the South Ossetian and Abkhazian Orthodox Churches requested to join the Russian Orthodox Church (ROC), but the ROC denied these requests and has repeatedly affirmed the Georgian Church's canonical jurisdiction over South Ossetia and Abkhazia, prioritizing its positive relationship with the Georgian Church and canonical propriety. When the South Ossetian Church declared its separation, 15 parishes joined, while some five parishes remained with the Georgian Church. The Georgian Church continues to carry out some pastoral responsibilities in the Akhalgori area. After the ROC refused to incorporate the South Ossetians into the Moscow Patriarchate, the South Ossetian church joined the Russian Orthodox Church Abroad (ROCA) in 1993 and was granted deanery status in 1998, but the ROCA distanced itself from the South Ossetian church when it began improving relations with the ROC in 2001. Due to this, the South Ossetians began aligning with the non-canonical Old Calendarist Holy Synod in Resistance. In 2005, the Eparchy of Alania was created, and Pukhate was consecrated a bishop by the Synod. In 2008, the ROC once again denied the South Ossetians' request to join its jurisdiction. The Alania Diocese maintains that it is a continuation of the Alan Diocese, an eparchy in the region that existed from the 10th to the 16th centuries. It is regarded as schismatic from the mainstream Orthodox church.

=== Traditional religion and neo-paganism ===
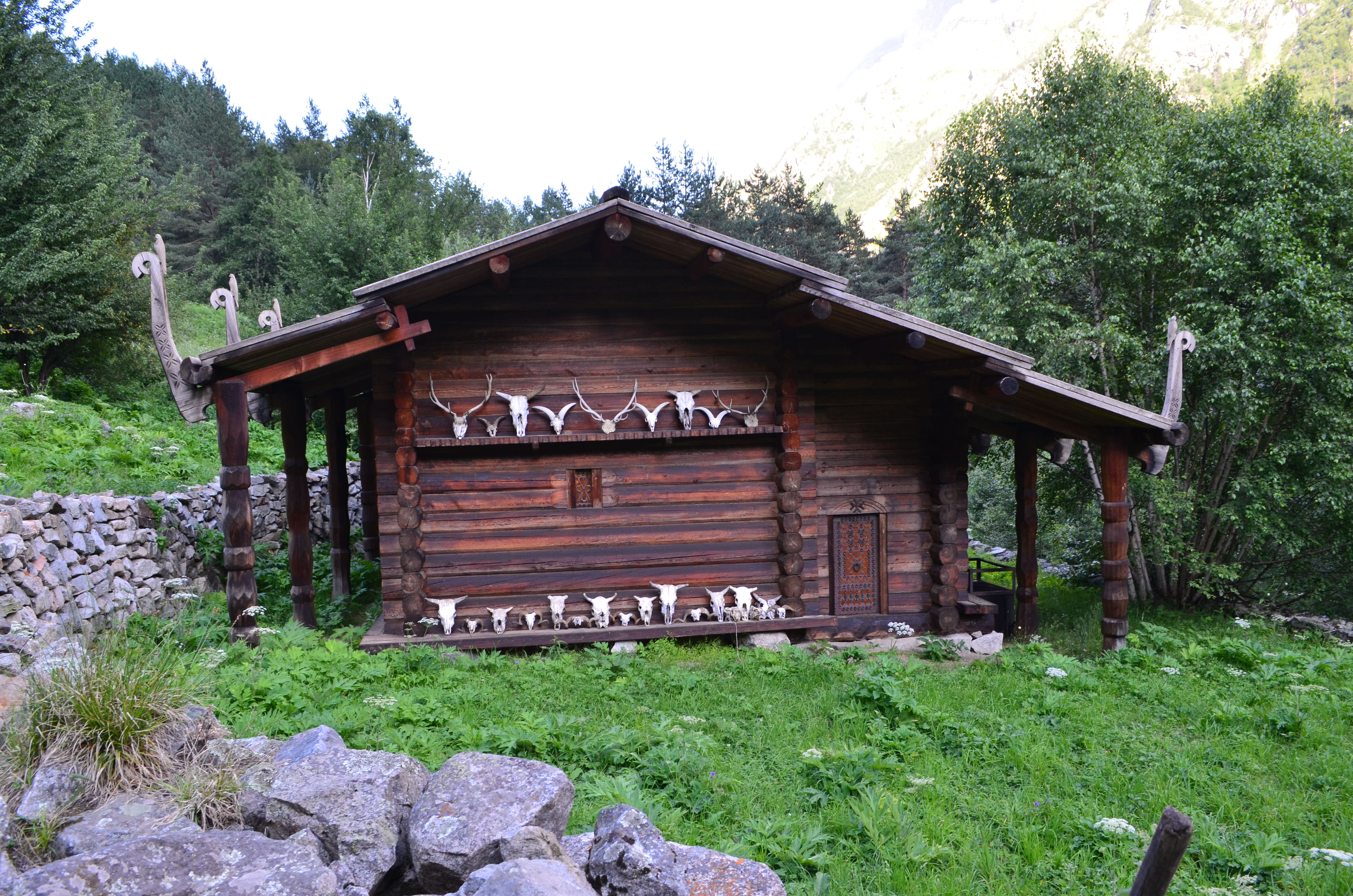
Rekom shrine in North Ossetia near the border, the most popular Uatsdin shrine in Ossetia

Ossetian ethnic religion, most commonly known as Uatsdin, is present in South Ossetia. Uatsdin is nature-oriented and polytheistic; the creator god is Xucau, head of a pantheon of deities reflecting Iranian and Christian influence. Richard Foltz connects the Ossetian religion to that of the ancient Scythians. The Ossetians, being an Iranian people, inherited and preserved many aspects of ancient Iranian religion; when the Alans came under Byzantine and Georgian influence, they accepted Christianity but the population remained largely pagan. During the Mongol period, the Alans, later the Ossetians, lost contact with the church as they retreated into the mountains. They reverted almost entirely to paganism, with only superficial aspects of Christianity remaining, such as the dedication of shrines to Christian saints. In the 1980s, leading up to the fall of the Soviet Union, many constituent peoples of the state attempted to build new identities, including the Ossetians. Many of the Ossetian nationalists aimed at reviving a more authentic, pre-Christian religion. In the early 1990s, a group of nationalist intellectuals formed the Styr Nykhas ("Great Council"), which led the revival movement, in an effort to organize Ossetian tradition along the lines of other neopagan groups. Due to the fluidity of Ossetian popular religion and the prevalence of syncretism with pre-Christian tradition, Uatsdin has drawn criticism from Christian and Muslim leaders in Ossetia, and even attempts to ban Uatsdin literature by the Russian Orthodox Church.

One major annual ritual in South Ossetia takes place at the Usanet dzuar shrine; in the spring, thousands of pilgrims travel to the mountaintop shrine to leave offerings to Æfsati, the god of the hunt. The ceremony commemorates a legend that in previous eras, a deer would sacrifice itself atop the mountain, but the deer stopped coming when the people began to disregard tradition. The ruined stone shrine may be a medieval Christian church. The Khetag grove near Alagir in North Ossetia has served as a site for pan-Ossetian rituals since the early 1990s, and is considered one of the most important Ossetian shrines.

=== Judaism ===
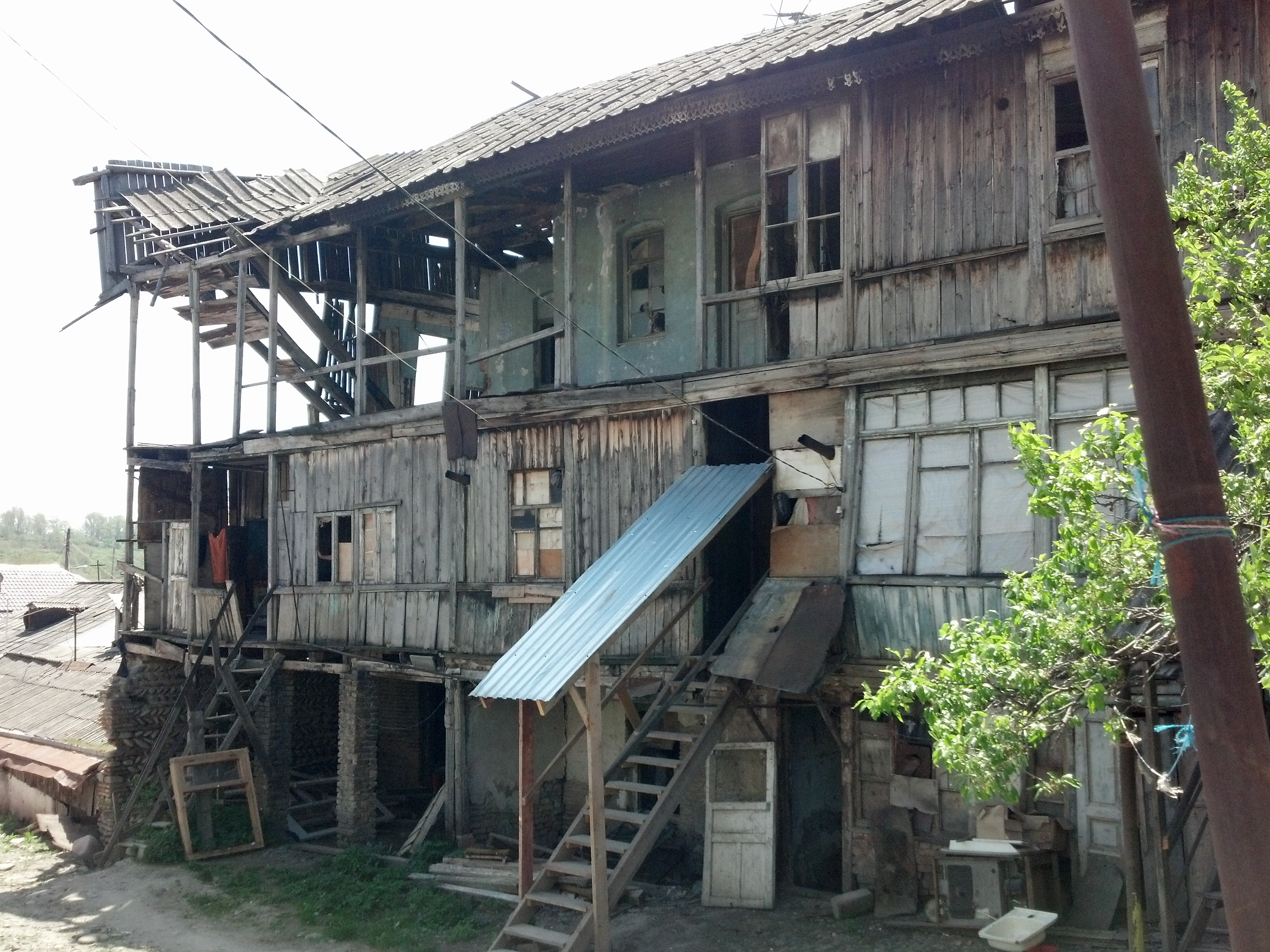
Building in the Jewish quarter of Tskhinvali

Tskhinvali, the largest city in South Ossetia, historically had a large Jewish community, which sometimes outnumbered the Georgian, Armenian, and Ossetian populations. The Jewish community of Tskhinvali dates back to at least the Middle Ages, and was involved in trade. They were mostly serfs. The Jewish population was largely Ashkenazi, variously speaking Georgian, Ossetian, Russian, and Yiddish. A small Russian-speaking Sephardi community existed as well. Relations between the Tskhinvali Jews and the other ethnic groups of the city were largely peaceful, although there was tension and some violence in the period following the Bolshevik Revolution. In the 19th century, the city's Jewish population grew significantly and became economically prosperous, and there were six synagogues by the year 1900. In 1906, rabbi Avraham Khvolis founded the first Talmud Torah in Tskhinvali, which attracted students from throughout the region. Khvolis also established education for girls, a first for Georgian Jews, and sent his best students to Lithuanian yeshivas for further study. At their peak in 1917, Jews were the largest ethnic group in Tskhinvali, forming 38.4% of the population.

The Jewish population of Tskhinvali was repressed in the 1930s, and all but one synagogue was shut down by the authorities. The community declined throughout the 20th century as Jews moved elsewhere, particularly to Russia and Israel. During the 1991–1992 war, all but 17 of the Jews in the city fled, and the Jewish quarter was heavily damaged. During the Russo-Georgian War of 2008, only one Jew, an older woman, remained in South Ossetia. The Tskhinvali synagogue, largely unused for decades, was damaged by Georgian rocket fire as people were sheltering in its basement.

== Religious freedom ==
The constitution of the Republic of South Ossetia guarantees freedom of religion within the boundaries of the law, but emphasizes the importance of Orthodox Christianity and Ossetian traditional beliefs. According to the 2022 Report on International Religious Freedom published by the US State Department, authorities in South Ossetia restricted the access of Georgian clergy and pressured the remaining Georgian Orthodox parishes to join the Russian Orthodox Church. While South Ossetia officially bans the Georgian Orthodox Church as well as Jehovah's Witnesses, the authorities reportedly have allowed the groups, along with Pentecostals, to assemble in Akhalgori.

== See also ==
- Uastyrdzhi
- Religion in Abkhazia
- Religion in Georgia (country)
- Religion in Russia
- Chechnya § Religion
