= Old Calendar Orthodox Church of Romania =

- Biserica Ortodoxă de Stil Vechi din România
- Type: Eastern Orthodoxy
- Classification: True Orthodoxу
- Orientation: Old Calendarist
- Scripture: Septuagint, New Testament
- Theology: Eastern Orthodox theology
- Polity: Episcopal
- Headquarters: Slătioara Monastery, Râșca, Suceava
- Territory: Romania
- Founder: Glycerius Tănase, David Bidașcu
- Separated from: Romanian Orthodox Church

The Old Calendar Orthodox Church of Romania (Romanian: Biserica Ortodoxă de Stil Vechi din România) is an Old Calendarist denomination.

== Relationship with other denominations ==
Since December 2022, the Old Calendar Orthodox Church of Romania is not in communion with any other groups.

== Primates ==
- Galaction Cordun (April 5, 1955 - July 8, 1959)
- Glycerius Tănase (July 18, 1959 - June 28, 1985)
- Sylvester Onofrei (July 29, 1985 - March 18, 1992)
- Blaise Mogîrzan (May 18, 1992 - February 7, 2022)
- Demosthenes Ioniță (February 7, 2022 - July 20, 2024)
- Eulogius Nica (since September 1, 2024)
