= Australian Fellowship of Faith Churches and Ministers International =

The Australian Fellowship of Faith Churches and Ministers International or AFFCMI is an evangelical, Pentecostal church movement founded by Dr Garnet Budge, Rev. Keith Hannah and Rev. Dwight Hicks in Brisbane on 10 July 1988 to provide a ministerial organisation catering to independent churches and ministers around Australia. In the early 1990s Dwight Hicks left the Board and was succeeded by Rev. Barry Follet from Gosford, New South Wales. Dr Garnet Budge retired in August 2008 after 20 years as a director.

AFFCMI operates as a fellowship of individual Christians who are in communion, rather than a traditional religious denominational structure, which attempts to provide protection, security, information, inspiration and relationships without direct controls and restrictions. As of 2007 there over 150 churches and affiliated ministers situated throughout Australia, North America, Africa, and the Pacific Islands.

AFFCMI holds an annual conference gathering ministers from its member churches worldwide normally in October featuring keynote International Speakers such as Kelly Varner.
