= Autonomous Orthodox Metropolis of Ecuador and Latin America =

The Autonomous Orthodox Metropolis of Ecuador and Latin America is an Old Calendarist jurisdiction which originally comprised the archdiocese in South America and Caribbean of the Ukrainian Autocephalous Orthodox Church in America, subsequently becoming a Metropolis, affiliated to the "Holy Metropolitan Synod of Avlona and Boeotia" (in Greece) in 2010. It is managed by Metropolitan Chrysostom (Celi). It has missions for the area in more than 22 Latin American countries. This is a religious organization recognized by the Ecuadorian government in June 2006. Due to its Old Calendarist status, this jurisdiction is not listed within the diptychs recognized by historical patriarchal sees of the Eastern Orthodox Church (as Constantinople, Moscow and Antioch), or any church groups in communion with these.

== Founding of the "Metropolis of Latin America" ==
The Authonomous Orthodox Metropolia of Ecuador and all Latin America was created in 2010 with the idea of being an independent jurisdiction, the "Holy Synod Metropolitan Avlonas And Boeotia" granted this jurisdiction a tomos of autonomy in November 2010, which allows the presence of the Church under now Metropolitan Chrysostomos. Further the Autonomy was granted, without ceasing to belong to the Greek Synod.

According to the testimony of the biography of this Metropolia, it has established several missions and parishes in Latin America, achieving presence in the city of Quito and Guayaquil, Ecuador; Bogotá, Santa Rosa, Puente Nacional, Tichá and Guachetá, Colombia; Caracas, Venezuela; São Paulo and Recife, Brazil; San José, Costa Rica; and Tijuana, Mexico, among other locations. Significantly, this process was carried out after the jurisdiction of the "Autonomous Ukrainian Orthodox Church of America", discarded the territory of Ecuador in its Metropolis. In February 2014 one mission was formed in the city of Austin, Texas in the United States. In November 2015, the North American Mission was transferred under the Omophor of Metropolitan Angelos of Avlona.

== See also ==
- Autonomous Orthodox Metropolia of North and South America and the British Isles
- True Orthodox Metropolis of Germany and Europe
- Old Calendarists
