= Old Calendarists =

Group of traditionalist Eastern Orthodox bodies

Regions with significant populations
- Greece: 250 000–2 million (1991); 500 000–800 000 (2005)
- Romania: 1 million (1991); "probably over 1 million" (1999)
- USA: at least 2,000 (2011)

Religions
- Christianity (Eastern Orthodoxy)

Old Calendarists (Greek: palaioimerologitai or palaioimerologites), also known as Old Feasters (palaioeortologitai), Genuine Orthodox Christians or True Orthodox Christians (GOC; Greek: Γνήσιοι Ορθόδοξοι Χριστιανοί, romanized: Gnisioi Orthodoxoi Christianoi), are traditionalist groups of Eastern Orthodox Christians that separated from mainstream Eastern Orthodox churches because some of the latter adopted the revised Julian calendar while Old Calendarists remained committed to the Julian calendar.

Old Calendarists are not in communion with any mainstream Eastern Orthodox churches.

"Old Calendarists" is another name for the True Orthodox movement in Romania, Bulgaria, Greece and Cyprus.

== Terminology ==
Mainstream Eastern Orthodox Christians that use the old (Julian) calendar are not what is designated by the expression "Old Calendarist", because they remain in communion with the Eastern Orthodox churches that use the new calendar (the Revised Julian calendar). Old Calendarists have severed communion with the mainstream Eastern Orthodox that follow the old calendar, because the latter maintained communion with Eastern Orthodox churches that had adopted the revised calendar. Thus, to be "Old Calendarist" is not the same thing as only following the old calendar. The Russian Orthodox Church, for instance, is not Old Calendarist, but follows the old (Julian) calendar.

== History ==
=== Background ===
Until 1924, the Eastern Orthodox Church universally used the Julian calendar, whereas the Roman Catholic Church, under Pope Gregory XIII, conducted a calendar reform resulting in the Gregorian calendar in 1582. The difference between the two calendars is 13 days between 1900 and 2100.

==== 1923 Congress ====
In May 1923, the Pan-Orthodox Council of Constantinople, called by Patriarch Meletius IV of Constantinople, adopted the Revised Julian calendar. This new calendar was different from both the Julian and Gregorian calendars, but would not diverge from the Gregorian calendar for a further 800 years. The Revised Julian calendar replaced the tabular date of Easter of the Julian calendar with an astronomical date of Easter. The astronomical Easter was unpopular and hardly used at all, and for the purpose of calculating the date of Easter the Julian calendar was restored. Not all Eastern Orthodox churches were represented at the congress or adopted its decisions, and the Russian Orthodox Church and some other Eastern Orthodox churches have continued to use the Julian calendar liturgically to this day.

=== Birth ===
==== Greece ====
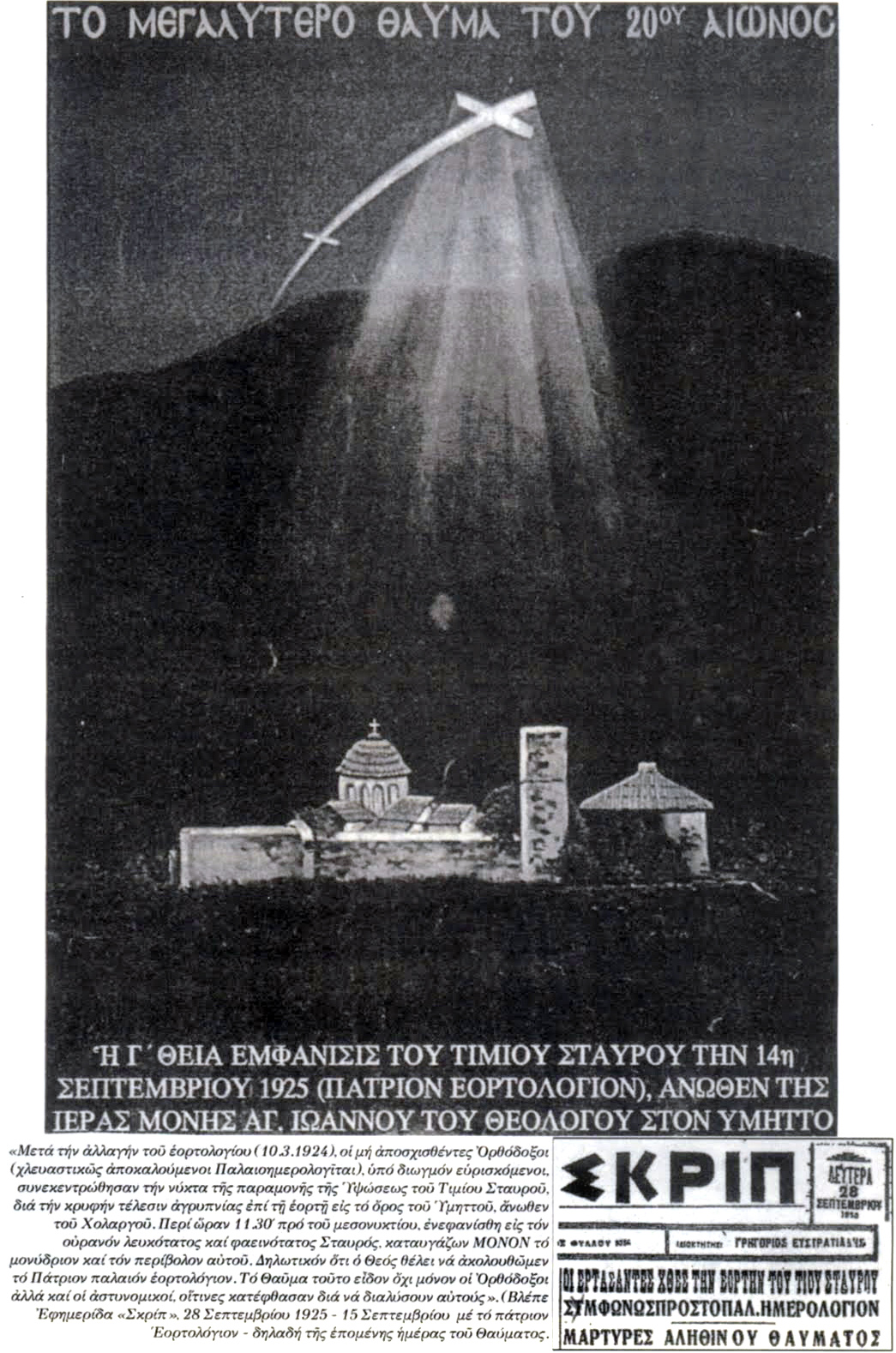
Apparition of the Holy Cross over the Greek Old Calendarist Monastery of St. John the Theologian in Hymettus, in 1925. Artist's rendition in a newspaper at the time.

In 1924, the Church of Greece adopted the Revised Julian calendar, also called 'New calendar'. "At first, resistance to the New Calendar was muted". The Old Calendarists in Greece were at first a small number of laymen, priests and monks, whose number grew over the years.

Before they were joined by bishops, the Old Calendarist movement in Greece was only composed of priests and laypeople, and also "several hundreds monks from Athos".

In 1935, three bishops of the Church of Greece joined the movement and consecrated four new bishops for the movement. Of those three bishops, Metropolitan Chrysostomos (Kavourides) of Florina became the leader of the Greek Old Calendarist movement. Of the three bishops who had joined, Chrysostom of Zakynthos soon left the movement after the consecration and went back to the Church of Greece. Of the four bishops consecrated, two joined the Church of Greece. This left the Greek Old Calendarist movement with four bishops: Chrysostomos of Florina, Germanos of Demetria, Germanos of the Cyclades, and Matthew (Karpoudakis) of Vrestheni. Those remaining four bishops created an Old Calendarist Holy Synod.

While the Greek Old Calendarists were "[o]riginally perhaps a million strong", they were severely persecuted by the State of Greece; Metropolitan Chrysostomos was imprisoned in Lesbos in 1951 as part of those persecutions.

===== Splits =====
Timeline of the main Greek Old Calendarist churches until 2021.

The Greek Old Calendarists experienced schism in 1937, due to a disagreement on the validity of the sacraments performed by members of churches which have adopted the reformed calendar. After Chrysostomos, head of the Holy Synod, refused to declare the sacraments of the New Calendarists as graceless, bishop Matthew led the group which seceded from the Holy Synod.

After this, Matthew ordained a number of bishops himself, and formed a separate Holy Synod of which he was the head as archbishop of Athens. Matthew died in 1950.

After Chrysostomos' death in 1955, his group had no bishop until 1960, when two bishops of the Russian Orthodox Church Outside of Russia (ROCOR) consecrated Akakios archbishop. Akakios consecrated other bishops with the participation of another different ROCOR bishop. Akakios was succeeded by Auxentios. Under Auxentios, "complicated patterns of division and realignment occurred both within his own jurisdiction and among the followers of Archbishop Matthew". Due to this, in 1999 there were at least five different Greek Old Calendarist churches, each headed by a different archbishop of Athens. Additionally, there was also a 'Cyprianite' Greek Old Calendarist Church, whose adjective derives from its leader, bishop Cyprian of Oropos and Phyli.

In 1971, the ROCOR tried to unite the factions of Greek Old Calendarists, but failed. In 1999, the most important groups of Greek Old Calendarists were the Chrysostomites, the Matthewites, and the Cyprianites.

==== Romania ====
Also in 1924, the Romanian Orthodox Church adopted the revised calendar; at this moment the Old Calendarist movement began in Romania. The abbot of Prokof, Glycerius Tănase, became the head of the Old Calendarist movement in Romania. Hierarchs in Greece, supporting the Old Calendarists, did not manage to consecrate Tanase a bishop due to interventions of the Greek State.

By 1936, many parishes had left the Romanian Orthodox Church to become Old Calendarist, and more than forty new churches had been built for the use of Romanian Old Calendarist communities.

From 1935 and onwards, the Romanian government enacted "drastic measures" aimed to "eradicate organized opposition" to the Romanian Orthodox Church. Due to this, Romanian Old Calendarist churches and monasteries "were razed", and Romanian Old Calendarists activists were incarcerated. "Many, like Abbot Pambo, were killed and Glicherie Tănase was repeatedly imprisoned." Those persecutions went on "until the collapse of the [Romanian] regime at the end of the Second World War."

In 1955, one bishop of the Romanian Orthodox Church, Metropolitan Galaction Cordun, joined the Old Calendarist movement in Romania. Before they were joined by a bishops, the Old Calendarist movement in Romania was only composed of priests and laypeople, of which "several hundreds monks from Athos".

Metropolitan Galaction, while under house arrest, consecrated other Old Calendarist bishops: Eulogius Oța, Methodius Marinache, and Glycerius Tănase. Later, a Holy Synod of the Romanian Old Calendarists was "formally established".

Since the Ceaușescu period, the Romania Old Calendarist Church "has flourished, establishing a vigorous parochial and monastic life." Since the fall of Ceaușescu, the Romanian Old Calendarist movement "has grown notably."

The Romanian Old Calendarist movement remained united, unlike the Greek Old Calendarist movement.

Metropolitan Galaction was the first head of the Romanian Old Calendarist, until his death in 1959. Galaction was succeeded as head by Tănase, who became the second leader of the Romania Old Calendarist Church, from 1960 until his death in 1985. Tanase was canonized by the Romania Old Calendarist Church in 1999.

==== Bulgaria ====
The Bulgarian Orthodox Church adopted the revised Julian calendar in 1968. The Protection Convent near Sofia became a center of the resistance to this adoption. In 1993, Photius Siromakhov of Triadista was consecrated bishop by the Cyprianite Old Calendarist Church to be hierarch of the Bulgarian Old Calendarists.

== Intercommunion ==
In 1977, a declaration of intercommunion between the Cyprianite Old Calendarist Church and the Romanian Old Calendarist Church was signed.

In 1994, an act establishing communion between the ROCOR and the Cyprianite Old Calendarist Church established full communion between those two churches, as well as between Romanian and Bulgarian Old Calendarist churches. Those four churches were therefore "in a single communion".

The Cyprianite Old Calendarist Church severed its communion with the ROCOR in 2005, because they considered the ROCOR was going to enter into a union with the Moscow Patriarchate, and had "jettisoned" its "anti-ecumenist outlook" as well as its cooperation with the Cyprianite Old Calendarist Church. Two weeks prior to the Cyprianite Old Calendarist Church's decision, the ROCOR had severed communion with the Cyprianite Old Calendarist Church due to its leader consecrating a bishop in Ossetia as Bishop of Alania.

The Romanian Old Calendarist Church severed communion with the other churches in 2022. Since then the Chrysostomos Synod is in communion with the Bulgarian Old Calendarist Church and ROCOR (A).

== Demography ==
In 1999, it was estimated that "[t]here are probably over one million Old Calendarists in Romania, somewhat fewer in Greece, and considerably fewer in Bulgaria, Cyprus, and the [Eastern Orthodox] diaspora."

== Categories ==
There exists two trends within Old Calendarism. The first one is "resistance Old Calendarism", the second is "integrist Old Calendarism".

The first position "expresses resistance to what it sees as unlawful innovation and walls itself off from churches using the new calendar and compromised by what is seen as the heresy of ecumenism. It refuses, however, to condemn the rites and sacraments of New Calendarists as devoid of grace, and seeks by witness and courteous dialogue to draw the [Eastern] Orthodox majority to its traditionalist outlook." This trend is to be found for example in among the True Orthodox of Cyprianite stance.

The second position "rejects all New Calendarist churches, all those in communion with New Calendarists and all who refuse to reject the sacraments of the New Calendarists as outside the [Eastern] Orthodox Church and therefore as having sacraments devoid of grace." Churches which hold this position "see themselves as the surviving [Eastern] Orthodox church, maintaining the integrity of [Eastern] Orthodox tradition in the face of massive apostasy." This trend is to be found for example in the Old Calendarist churches of the Matthewite succession.

In 1999, it was noted that "a more recent cause of division, especially among Matthewites, is the icon of the Holy Trinity portraying God the Father as "the Ancient of Days": some Old Calendarists reject the icon, others reject the rejecters as iconoclasts."

== Groups ==
Old Calendarist groups include:

- Greek Old Calendarists, composed of numerous churches of which are:
  - Holy Synod of Milan
  - Autonomous Orthodox Metropolia of North and South America and the British Isles
  - Church of the Genuine Orthodox Christians of Greece
    - Auxentius Synod
    - Chrysostomos Synod
      - Eparchy of Alania
    - Matthew Synod
    - Gregorian Synod
    - Kirykos Synod
  - Church of the Genuine Orthodox Christians of Greece of the Patristic Calendar
    - Autonomous Orthodox Metropolis of Ecuador and Latin America
    - True Orthodox Metropolis of Germany and Europe
  - Holy Orthodox Church in North America
  - Orthodox Church of Greece (Holy Synod in Resistance) (defunct)
  - Indonesian Orthodox Church
- Old Calendar Bulgarian Orthodox Church
- Old Calendar Orthodox Church of Romania

== See also ==
- Eastern Orthodox liturgical calendar
- Independent sacramental movement
- New Calendarists
- Old Believers
- Ancient Church of the East
