= Kyprianos Koutsoumpas =

Kyprianos or Cyprian (Greek: Κυπριανός, secular name Dimitrios Koutsoumbas, Greek: Δημήτριος Κουτσούμπας; 1935 – May 30, 2013) was an Old Calendarist, and metropolitan of Oropos and Fyli and President of the Holy Synod of the Orthodox Church of Greece - Holy Synod in Resistance.

== Early life ==
Koutsoumpas was born in Agrinio in 1935. Upon completion of his secondary education he entered an E. Orthodox seminary, under the supervision of his spiritual father the elder Philotheos (Zervakos), himself a spiritual son of St. Nectarios of Aegina.

== Priesthood and episcopacy ==
Koutsoumpas was tonsured with the name Kyprianos (Cyprian) in the Monastery of Saint John the Theologian on the island of Patmos. In 1961, the then hieromonk Kyprianos founded the Monastery of Sts. Cyprian and Justina in Fyli, Attica, becoming its first abbot. In 1968, on the Sunday of Orthodoxy, considering the Revised Julian Calendar was an error and its adoption an ecumenical excesses, the monastery unilaterally adopted the traditional (Patristic, or "old") Julian calendar for services, while continuing to commemorate their diocesan bishop, Metropolitan Nikodemos, in the new calendar.

In his book, How I Learned About the Patristic Calendar and How I Returned to It, Kyprianos stated he initially hesitated to join the Greek Old Calendarists due to the sectarianism and extremism of some of its members.

On January 3/16, 1969, with the blessing of his spiritual father, Elder Philotheos (Zervakos) of Paros, Kyprianos and his monastery joined the Church of the Genuine Orthodox Christians of Greece, a Greek Old Calendarists denomination. On February 7, 1979, he was consecrated bishop of Oropos and Fili. On April 5, 1985, he was elected as the President of the Synod of the Orthodox Church of Greece (Holy Synod in Resistance).

Koutsoumpas is an author of books and articles on E. Orthodox theology and spirituality, many of which have been translated to different languages. Some of his works include: A Manual for Coenobitic Monastics; The Monastic Life; The World Council of Churches and the Interfaith Movement; Eldress Myrtidiotissa; "Schism" or "Walling Off"?; and Do You Have a Ticket?. Koutsoumpas was the recipient of two theological degrees, honoris causa: a Licentiate in Theology from the Center for Traditionalist Orthodox Studies, and a Doctorate in Theology, from the Orthodox Theological Academy of St. Martin.

In 2007 he fell into a coma after a massive stroke. Koutsoumpas died on May 30, 2013, at the Monastery of Saint Cyprian and Justina in Fyli.

== Succession ==
He was succeeded as head of the Holy Synod in Resistance by Metropolitan Cyprian (Julis) (Cyprian II) of Oropos and Fili (2013–14).
