= Council of Constantinople (1923) =

Meeting of Eastern Orthodox leaders in Constantinople

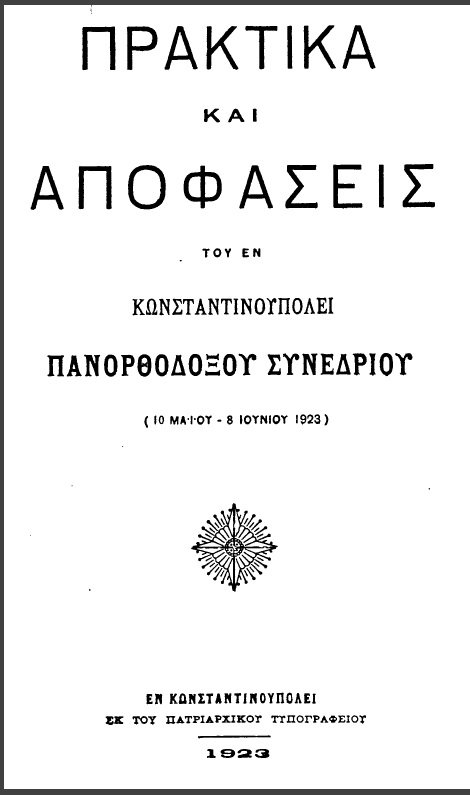
Title page of the acts and decisions of the council.

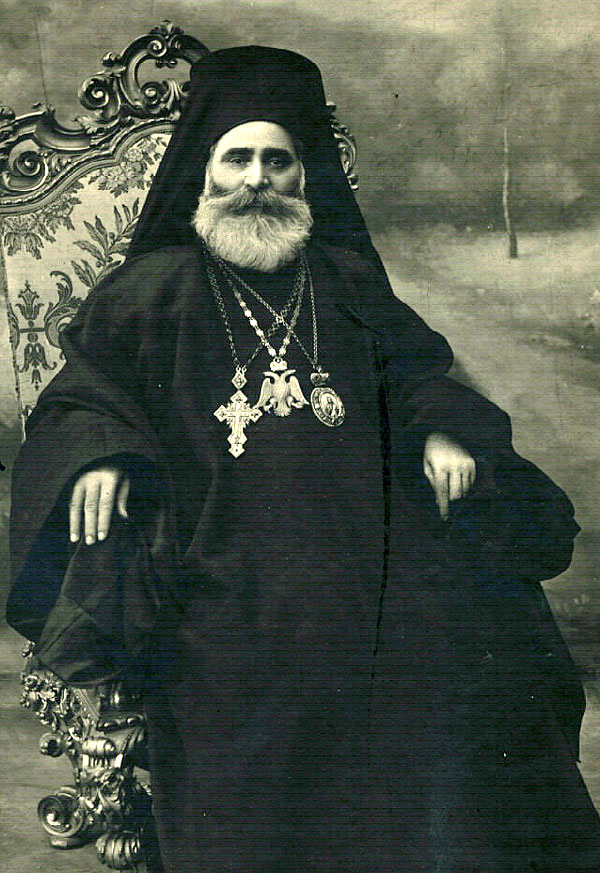
Ecumenical Patriarch Meletius IV convened the 1923 Council of Constantinople.

The Council of Constantinople of 1923 was a meeting of representatives of several local Eastern Orthodox Churches held in Constantinople from 10 May to 8 June 1923, convened at the initiative of Ecumenical Patriarch Meletius Metaxakis. In spite of being called by some as the "Pan-Orthodox Council of Constantinople of 1923", or otherwise referred to as "pan-Orthodox" or as an "ecumenical council", the council is not recognized as an ecumenical council: "Calling the 1923 Council 'ecumenical' cannot be accepted, since representatives of the Alexandrian, Antiochian, Jerusalem and most of the other Local Churches did not participate in its work."

The primary topic of the Council of 1923 was calendar reform. The Roman Catholic Church and almost all of Western Europe completed their switch from the Julian calendar to the Gregorian calendar, the current international standard, during the 16th century. Russia, and the rest of the Orthodox world, however, remained on the old calendar until this council. At this council, the Greek Orthodox Church, and many other branches of the Eastern Orthodox Church adopted the new calendar, which they called "the new Julian calendar", which corresponds with the Gregorian calendar until 2800.

This council is extremely controversial within Eastern Orthodoxy—it led to many schisms in many autocephalous churches of different Old Calendarist groups. Even academic sources note the controversy of this council.

The acts and decisions of this council were first translated into English only in 2006, by the Rev. Dr. Patrick Viscuso.

== Sources ==
- Viscuso, Patrick Demetrios (2006). A Quest for Reform of the Orthodox Church: The 1923 Pan-Orthodox Congress—an analysis and translation of its acts and decisions. Foreword by Demetrios Constantelos. Berkeley, California: Patriarch Athenagoras Orthodox Institute InterOrthodox Press. pp. 1–205. ISBN 978-1-932401-09-7. OCLC 71778926.
