= True Orthodox Metropolis of Germany and Europe =

German Eastern Orthodox church

- Type: Eastern Orthodox, previously Oriental Orthodox
- Classification: Independent Eastern Orthodox
- Orientation: True Orthodoxy (Old Calendarist)
- Theology: Eastern Orthodox theology previously Miaphysite
- Primate: Moses (Görgün)
- Language: Syriac, Malayalam, German
- Liturgy: Byzantine Rite previously West Syrian Rite
- Headquarters: Monastery of St. Gabriel, Altenbergen, Germany
- Territory: Europe
- Founder: Moses (Görgün)
- Independence: 2017 as True Eastern Orthodox Church (2009 as Oriental Orthodox Autonomous Church)
- Recognition: True Orthodoxy (True Orthodox Metropolis of Ecuador and Latin America)
- Members: 15,000
- Other names: Syrian Orthodox Church of Europe (2006–2007), Antiochian Syrian Orthodox Church (2007–2016)

The True Orthodox Metropolis of Germany and Europe, formerly known as the Syrian Orthodox Church of Europe, is an autonomous Old Calendarist Eastern Orthodox church based in Altenbergen, Germany; it is headed by metropolitan Moses Görgün. The church is part of the Avlona Synod.

Until 2016, the church belonged to the Oriental Orthodox tradition, and it was originally known as the Syrian Orthodox Church of Europe and later as the Antiochian Syrian Orthodox Church. The major part of the community, headed by metropolitan Moses Görgün, converted to the Old Calendarist (also called True Orthodox) tradition within Eastern Orthodoxy and in 2017, it was granted autonomy and jurisdiction over Germany and Europe by the Avlona Synod. It is in full communion with the True Orthodox Metropolis of Ecuador and Latin America, which is another diocese of the Avlona Synod.

== History ==
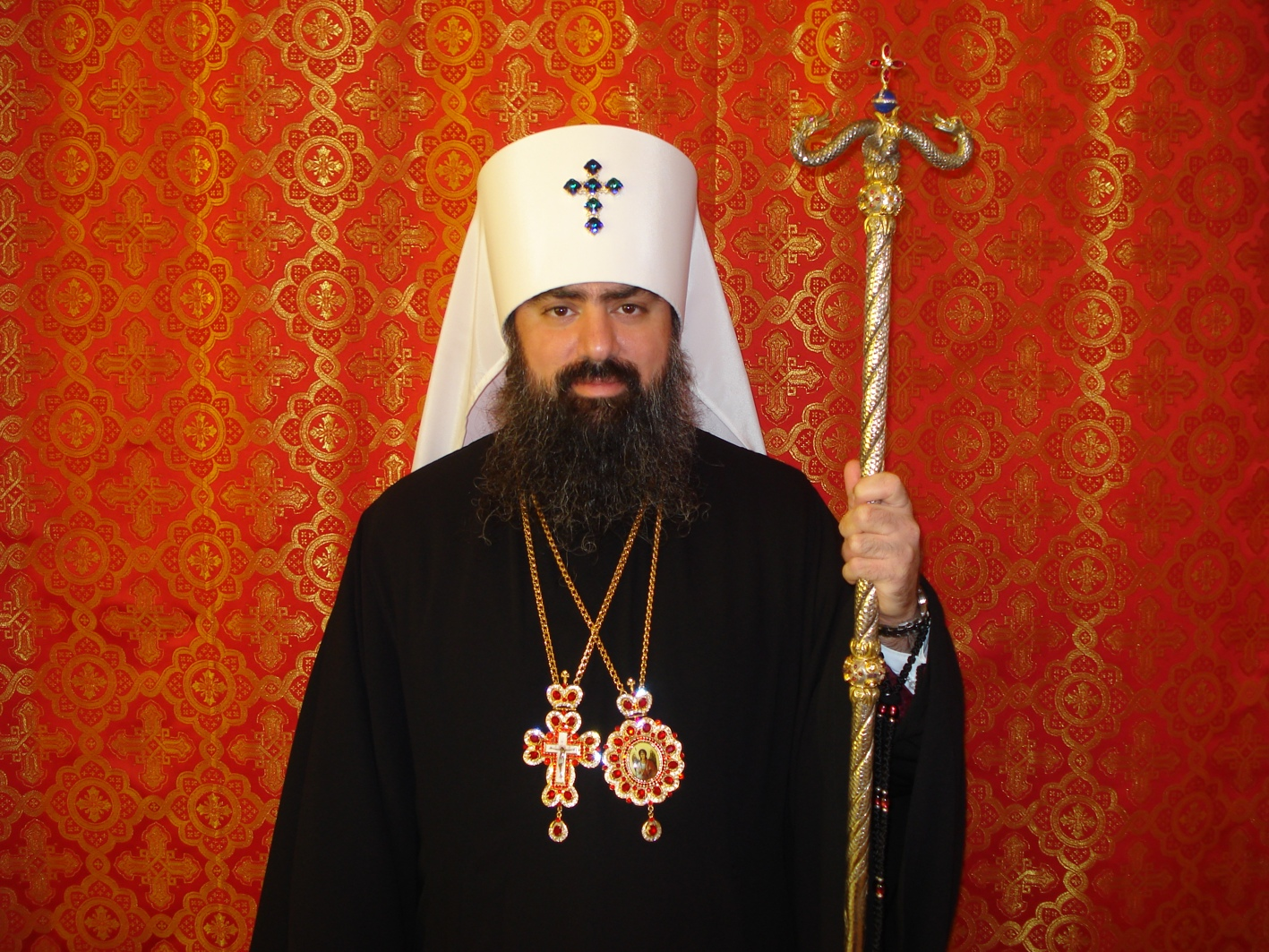
Metropolitan Moses Görgün, while he was Oriental Orthodox hierarch (2009)

On November 21 2006, Moses Görgün was consecrated metropolitan bishop of Europe in Thrissur by Bishop Yuhanon Mar Meletius of Thrissur and Bishop Thomas Mar Athanasius of Kandanad with the support of Bishop Thomas Mar Makarios of Europe, UK and Canada, upon which he assumed the name, Mor Severius Moses Görgün. On December 5, the Syriac Orthodox Church excommunicated Mor Severius Moses Görgün and his supporters. The consecration was recognised by the Malankara Orthodox Syrian Church on December 7 after an episcopal synod was convened by the Primate of the church, Baselios Thoma Didymos I, who heard and accepted Yuhanon Mar Meletius and Thomas Mar Athanasius' reasons for consecrating Mor Severius Moses Görgün without the consent of the synod.

On March 16, 2009, the synod of the Malankara Orthodox Syrian Church elevated the archdiocese to the status of autocephaly and was granted the name of the Syrian Orthodox Church of Europe; Mor Severius Moses Görgün was appointed as Primate and Metropolitan of the church. In May, the jurisdiction of the church was confirmed to be restricted to Europe by the Malankara Orthodox Syrian Church, and that the church had no jurisdiction over the church in India. Despite this, on March 21, 2010, Mor Severius Moses Görgün consecrated Mor Bartholomaos Joseph as metropolitan bishop of Angamaly, a diocese within the jurisdiction of the Malankara Orthodox Syrian Church.

As a result of this infringement, Baselios Thoma Didymos I excommunicated Mor Severius Moses Görgün and withdrew his recognition of the church. This led the church to change its name to reflect its presence outside of Europe and on April 28, 2010, the synod of the church changed the name of the church to the Antiochian Syrian Orthodox Church.

The following year, however, to soothe relations with the Malankara Orthodox Syrian Church, the synod of the Antiochian Syriac Orthodox Church choose to dissolve the dioceses of Idukki and Angamaly in September and their bishops stood down. In Spring 2012, the church began construction of the Monastery of St. Gabriel, near Altenbergen, Germany, and in August 2014, the monastery was consecrated and became the headquarters of the church.
