= Russian True Orthodox Church (Lazar Zhurbenko) =

Religious denomination formed in 2002

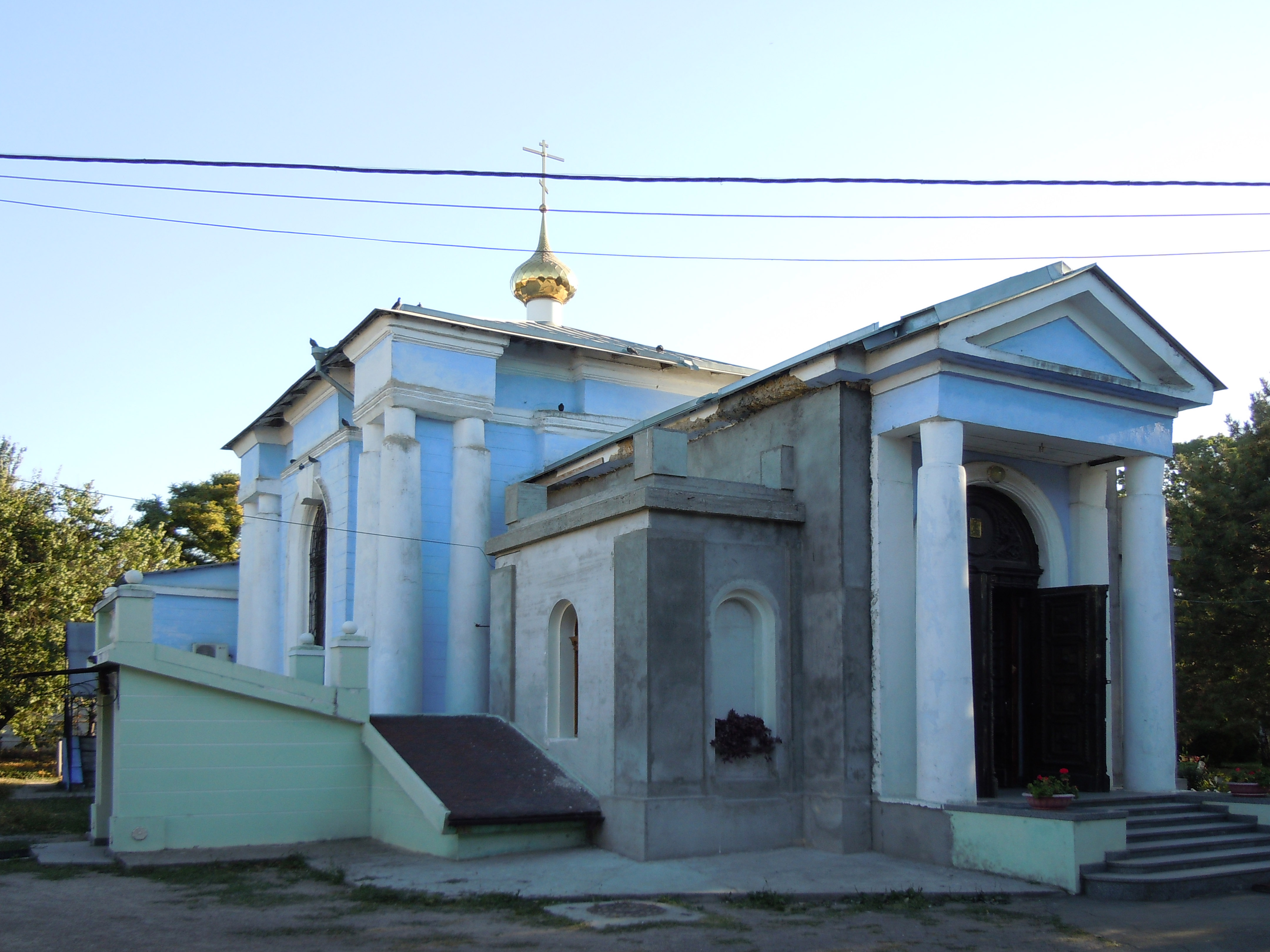
- Cathedral Church of the RTOC in Odesa dedicated to St. John of Kronstadt
- Abbreviation: RTOC
- Type: Eastern Orthodox
- Classification: Independent Eastern Orthodox
- Orientation: True Orthodox
- President of the Holy Synod: Archbishop Tikhon (Pasechnik)
- Archbishops: 2
- Bishops: 3
- Possessions: Russia, Ukraine, Belarus, Hungary, United States, United Kingdom, Greece, Argentina, Brazil, Serbia
- Origin: 2002
- Independence: 2002
- Recognition: Unrecognized by Eastern Orthodox Churches – see True Orthodoxy
- Other names: Lazarites, Tikhonites
- Official website: www.ripc.info

The Russian True Orthodox Church (RTOC, Russian: Российская истинно православная церковь, РИПЦ), also called Lazarites (after Archbishop Lazar (Zhurbenko)) or Tikhonites (after Archbishop Tikhon (Pasechnik)), (Note: Not to be confused with the Russian Orthodox Church which was also called "tikhonites" by the Renovationist movement, after Patriarch Tikhon of Moscow.) is an independent Russian Orthodox church professing True Orthodoxy. It was formed in 2002 by Archbishop Lazar (Zhurbenko) and Bishop Benjamin (Rusalenko), the two hierarchs of ROCOR inside the territory of Russia, who refused the process of unification of the ROCOR with the Moscow Patriarchate; Lazar and Benjamin therefore joined the ROCOR (V) (a rival Church of the ROCOR), then left it thereafter and thus their Church became independent.

The RTOC has two Archbishops (Tikhon and Benjamin) and three Bishops (Filaret, Savvati and Germogen); the president of the Holy Synod is Archbishop Tikhon.

== History ==
The RTOC was formed in 2002, when Archbishop Lazar (Zhurbenko) and Bishop Benjamin (Rusalenko) ordained Bishop Tikhon (Pasechnik), Hermogen of Chernigov and Gomel, Bishop Irenaeus of Verniy (today Almaty) and Semirechiye and Bishop Dionysius of Novgorod and Tver. In 2003 they transformed their Hierarchical Forum into a Hierarchical Synod, the Russian True Orthodox Church. According to the RTOC, all this was in accordance with the Decree of Saint Patriarch Tikhon number 362, with their Second All-Russian Conference of clergy and laity, and had the blessing of Metropolitan Vitaly (Ustinov).

In 2011 the hierarchs of the RTOC have ordained hieromonk Akakije (Nemanja Stanković) as the bishop of the Serbian True Orthodox Church. In 2018 the bishops of the RTOC broke communion with the Serbian True Orthodox Church as Bishop Akakije took under his omophorion a large number of clergy that had no canonical leave from the hierarchs of the RTOC. Currently in Russia, the Russian True Orthodox Church has the following dioceses: Omsk-Siberia, Odesa-Kharkiv, Black Sea-Kuban, Chernihiv-Gomel, Novgorod-Tver, and Verney-Semirechiye (Kazakhstan).

== Doctrine ==
The RTOC rejects Sergianism and holds that the sacraments of the Moscow Patriarchate (which they consider distinct from the Russian Orthodox Church that existed before the Bolshevik revolution) are anathema or invalid and ineffectual for salvation. The RTOC upholds in principle and emphasizes the ROCOR 1983 anathema against ecumenism, which is an anathema against the branch theory.
