= Holy Synod of Milan =

Autocephalous True Orthodox jurisdiction

The Holy Synod of Milan is an autocephalous True Orthodox jurisdiction.

The church is not recognized by any official Eastern Orthodox Church worldwide therefore it is not in communion with any of them.

In 2011, the Holy Synod of Milan attempted to unite with the Moscow Patriarchate; thus the Holy Synod of Milan broke communion with the other synods it was then in communion with.
