= Autonomy (Eastern Orthodoxy) =

Self-governing regional churches

In Eastern Orthodoxy, autonomy designates a type of limited self-government of a church (group) toward its mother church. An autonomous church is self-governing in some aspects, which differentiates it from a non-autonomous church. The aspects on which the autonomous church is self-governing depends on the decision of the mother church. A church that is autonomous has its highest-ranking bishop, such as an archbishop or metropolitan, approved (or ordained) by the primate of the mother church.

Kephale (κεφαλή) means "head" in Greek, whereas nomos (νόμος) means "law". Hence, autocephalous (αὐτοκέφαλος) denotes self-headed, or a "head unto itself"; and autonomous denotes "self-legislated".

== See also ==
- Eastern Orthodox Church organization#Autonomous Eastern Orthodox churches
- Autocephaly
- Eparchy
- Tomos (Eastern Orthodox Church)
- Canon law of the Eastern Orthodox Church
