= Old Calendar Bulgarian Orthodox Church =

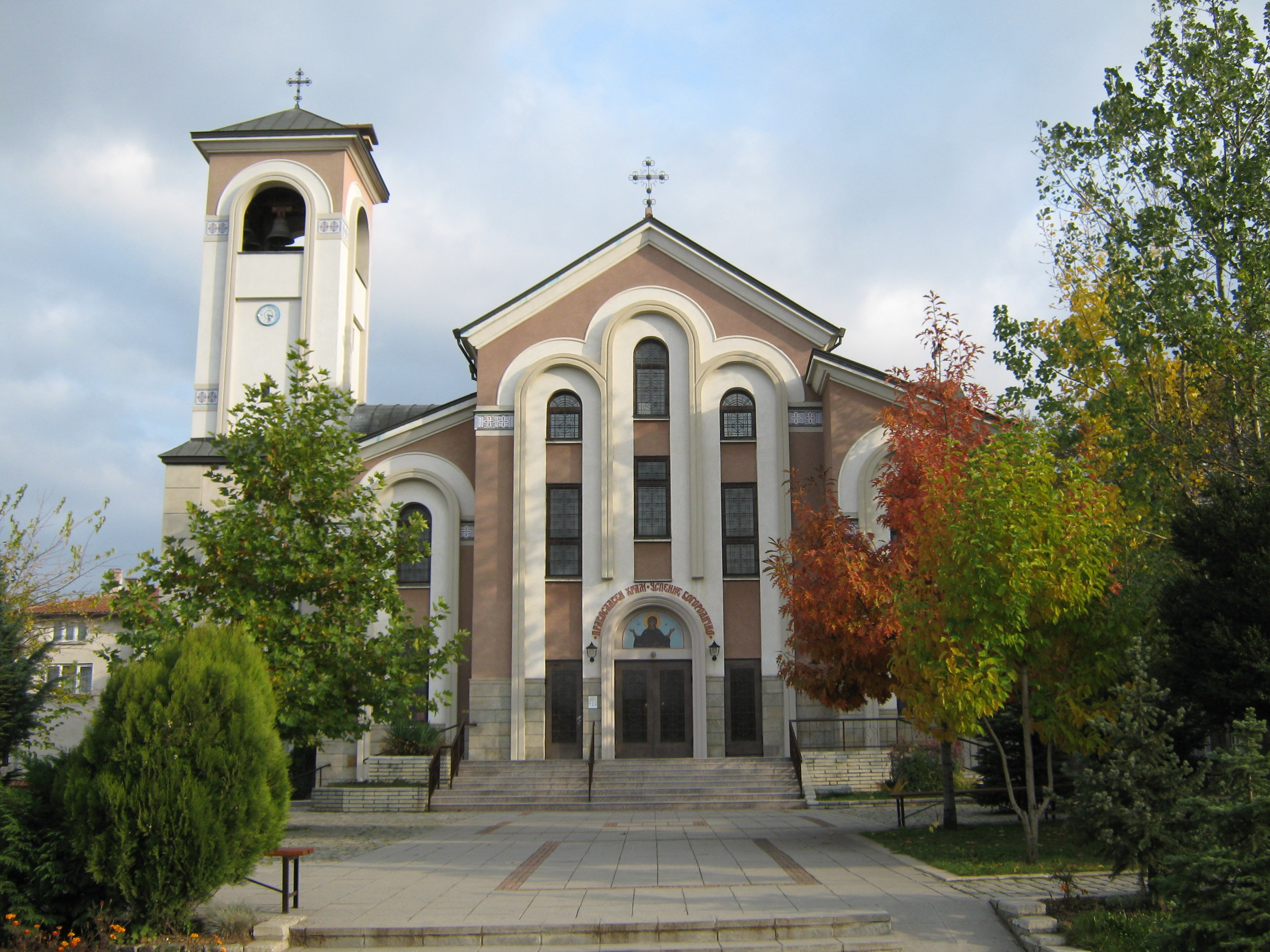
Dormition of the Theotokos church in Sofia, the main cathedral of the OCBOC

The Old Calendar Bulgarian Orthodox Church is an Old Calendarist church which follows the traditional Eastern Orthodox liturgical calendar, the Julian Calendar, and rejects ecumenism. From its creation in 1993 it was led by Metropolitan bishop Photius of Triaditsa.

In the teachings of the church, Ecumenism and Sergianism are identified as contemporary ecclesiological heresies that fundamentally corrupt the very concept of the Church. Ecumenism is described as a multi-stage, infiltrative heresy that seeks to reconstruct an "undivided Church" by uniting "divided Christians," yet it often avoids clear doctrinal expression, instead adopting a diplomatic stance that allows it to coalesce with "official Orthodoxy". Conversely, Sergianism is rooted in the delusion that deception and collaboration with enemies of the Church—originally atheist regimes—could serve to protect Her. The core ecclesiological distortion of Sergianism lies in its redefinition of "canonicity," which is stripped of its spiritual truth and transformed into a formal managerial technique used to demand absolute subordination to the episcopate, regardless of whether that leadership upholds the Truth. In its modern form, often termed neo-Sergianism, this manifests as a pathological servility to secular authorities for mercenary motives or social status, ultimately contributing to the rise of "official Orthodoxy," which is viewed as a diluted, pluralistic surrogate for authentic Orthodoxy.

Bulgarian Old Calendarists face difficulties from the Bulgarian authorities, who refuse to recognize them as an official religious entity.

== Status ==
Since its establishment, the Old Calendar Bulgarian Orthodox Church has been involved in a case for its registration as a religious denomination. The Supreme Court of Cassation ruled in favor of the Old Calendar Bulgarian Orthodox Church entering the register of religious denominations on 16 December 2024. This action was accepted by the Bulgarian Orthodox Church as the creation of a schism.

The political parties Revival, the Bulgarian Socialist Party and the Alternative for Bulgarian Revival, have declared themselves against the registration of the Old Calendar Bulgarian Orthodox Church. Revival has stated that they will amend the Law on Religions so that the phrase "Bulgarian Orthodox Church" will be used only by the Bulgarian Orthodox Church. After a meeting with Patriarch Daniil, GERB leader Boyko Borisov also declared his support for the BOC as "the sole expression of Orthodoxy in Bulgaria".

The Law on Amendments and Supplements to the Law on Religious Denominations, which entered into force on February 4, 2025, stipulates that all religious denominations in Bulgaria that may apply for entry in the register, must change their name if it contains the word "Orthodox" or derivatives and similar words, since according to Article 10, paragraph 1 of the law, the traditional religion in the Republic of Bulgaria is Eastern Orthodoxy. Referring to this law, on July 24, 2025, the Sofia City Prosecutor's Office filed an appeal against the Sofia City Court's refusal to terminate the registration of the Old Calendar Bulgarian Orthodox Church. The Court of Appeal in Sofia issued a final decision, opening proceedings for the liquidation and deletion of the "Old Calendar Bulgarian Orthodox Church".

== Structure and parishes ==
The Old Calendar Bulgarian Church has one Bishop, 19 parishes, and 21 priests.
