= Revised Julian calendar =

Calendar used by some Eastern Orthodox churches

The Revised Julian calendar, less formally the new calendar, also known as the Milanković calendar, is a calendar proposed in 1923 by the Serbian scientist Milutin Milanković as a more accurate alternative to both the Julian and Gregorian calendars. At the time, the Julian calendar was still in use by all Eastern Orthodox Church and affiliated nations, while Catholic and Protestant nations were using the Gregorian calendar, which had been proclaimed by Pope Gregory XIII's papal bull Inter gravissimas in 1582. Milanković's aim was to discontinue the divergence between the naming of dates in Eastern and Western churches and nations and intended to replace the Julian calendar in Eastern Orthodox churches and nations. The Revised Julian calendar aligns its dates with the Gregorian calendar from 1 March 1600 through 28 February 2800.

The Revised Julian calendar has been adopted for ecclesiastical use by the Ecumenical Patriarchate of Constantinople, the Albanian Orthodox Church, the Greek Orthodox Patriarchate of Alexandria, the Greek Orthodox Patriarchate of Antioch, the Bulgarian Orthodox Church, the Romanian Orthodox Church, the Cypriot Orthodox Church, the Church of Greece, the Orthodox Church of the Czech Lands and Slovakia, the Orthodox Church of Ukraine, and the Orthodox Church in America. It has not been adopted by the Russian Orthodox Church, the Serbian Orthodox Church, the Macedonian Orthodox Church, the Georgian Orthodox Church, the Polish Orthodox Church, and the Greek Orthodox Patriarchate of Jerusalem, as well as the Greek Orthodox monastic community on Mount Athos. It has not been adopted by any nation as an official calendar. Instead, all of the Eastern Orthodox (majority) nations have adopted the Gregorian calendar as the official state calendar.

The Revised Julian calendar has the same months and month lengths as the Julian and Gregorian calendars, but, in the Revised Julian version, years evenly divisible by 100 are not leap years, except those years with remainders of 200 or 600 when divided by 900, e.g. 2000 and 2400 as in the Gregorian calendar.

== Background ==
In the history of Christianity, divisions on which calendar to use were initiated after 1582, when the Catholic Church transitioned from the ancient Julian calendar to the new Gregorian calendar.

Eventually, by the 18th century, the Gregorian Calendar was officially adopted even in Protestant countries as the civil calendar, but still faced some opposition from smaller groups. In the Kingdom of Great Britain, the Gregorian calendar was officially introduced in 1752.

Around the same time, debates between those wanting to adopt the Gregorian Calendar and traditionalists wanting to keep the Julian calendar were also going on within several Eastern Catholic Churches. Those debates were focused mainly on ritual questions and ended in various compromises. The need for preservation of ritual differences, including various questions related to liturgical calendar, was consequently acknowledged by Rome.

== Implementation ==
Century year	Remain- der on divide by 900	Is a Revised Julian leap year	Is a Grego- rian leap year	Revised Julian is same as Grego- rian
1000	100	✗	✗	✓
1100	200	✓	✗	✗
1200	300	✗	✓	✗
1300	400	✗	✗	✓
1400	500	✗	✗	✓
1500	600	✓	✗	✗
1600	700	✗	✓	✗
1700	800	✗	✗	✓
1800	0	✗	✗	✓
1900	100	✗	✗	✓
2000	200	✓	✓	✓
2100	300	✗	✗	✓
2200	400	✗	✗	✓
2300	500	✗	✗	✓
2400	600	✓	✓	✓
2500	700	✗	✗	✓
2600	800	✗	✗	✓
2700	0	✗	✗	✓
2800	100	✗	✓	✗
2900	200	✓	✗	✗
3000	300	✗	✗	✓
3100	400	✗	✗	✓
3200	500	✗	✓	✗
3300	600	✓	✗	✗
3400	700	✗	✗	✓
3500	800	✗	✗	✓
3600	0	✗	✓	✗
3700	100	✗	✗	✓
3800	200	✓	✗	✗
3900	300	✗	✗	✓
4000	400	✗	✓	✗

Comparison of Revised Julian and Gregorian
calendar century years. (In the original Julian
calendar, every century year is a leap year.)

A committee composed of members of the Greek government and Greek Orthodox Church was set up to look into the question of calendar reform. It reported in January 1923. In the end, for civil purposes, the Gregorian calendar was adopted; the changeover went into effect on 16 February 1923/1 March 1923.

After the promulgation of the royal decree, the Ecumenical Patriarch, Patriarch Meletius IV of Constantinople, issued an encyclical on 3 February recommending the calendar's adoption by Orthodox churches, which is why it is sometimes also known as the Meletian Calendar. The matter came up for discussion at the Council of Constantinople (1923), which deliberated in May and June. Subsequently, it was adopted by several of the autocephalous Orthodox churches. The synod was chaired by Meletius IV and representatives were present from the churches of Cyprus, Greece, Romania and Serbia. There were no representatives of the other members of the original Orthodox Pentarchy (the Patriarchates of Jerusalem, Antioch, and Alexandria) or from the largest Orthodox church, the Russian Orthodox Church.

The Serbian delegation presented a proposal by Maksim Trpković, which had a leap year rule in which century years would become common years, except those with remainders of 0 or 400 when divided by 900, which would remain leap years. However, it was rejected because the proposal would omit a leap year in 2000, which would cause it to differ from the Gregorian after only 77 years. Milanković proposed a small modification of Trpkovic's proposal, changing the timing of the century leap years to those with remainder 200 or 600 when divided by 900 in order to maximise the amount of time before it would differ from the Gregorian.

Milanković's arguments won the day. In its decision the conference noted that "the difference between the length of the political year of the new calendar and the Gregorian is so small that only after 877 years it is observed difference of dates." The same decision provided that the coming 1 October should be called 14 October, thus dropping thirteen days. It then adopted the leap year rule of Milanković. The proposed calendar was preferred over the Gregorian because its mean year was within two seconds of the then current length of the mean tropical year. The present vernal equinox year, however, is about 12 seconds longer, in terms of mean solar days.

The synod also proposed the adoption of an astronomical rule for Easter: Easter was to be the Sunday after the midnight-to-midnight day at the meridian of the Church of the Holy Sepulchre in Jerusalem (35°13′47.2″ E or UT+2^{h}20^{m}55^{s} for the small dome) during which the first full moon after the vernal equinox occurs. Although the instant of the full moon must occur after the instant of the vernal equinox, it may occur on the same day. If the full moon occurs on a Sunday, Easter is the following Sunday. Churches that adopted this calendar did so on varying dates. However, all Eastern Orthodox churches continue to use the Julian calendar to determine the date of Easter (except for the Finnish Orthodox Church, which now uses the Gregorian Easter; the Estonian Orthodox Church used the Gregorian Easter from 1923 to 1945).

There were attempts to introduce Revised Julian as a religious calendar in the Soviet Union. On 12 June 1923, it was accepted by the short-lived schismatic Renovationist Church, which had seized church buildings with the support of the Soviet government while Patriarch Tikhon was under house arrest. After his release, on 15 July 1923, he declared that all Renovationist decrees were without grace. On 15 October 1923, Patriarch Tikhon accepted the new calendar, but it caused disagreement among clergy, and 24 days later he reverted the decision. The present Russian Orthodox Church continues to use the Julian calendar for both its fixed festivals and for Easter.

== Arithmetic ==
The following are Gregorian minus Revised Julian date differences, calculated for the beginning of January and March in each century year, which is where differences arise or disappear, until AD 10000. These are exact arithmetic calculations, not depending on any astronomy. A negative difference means that the proleptic Revised Julian calendar was behind the proleptic Gregorian calendar. The Revised Julian calendar is the same as the Gregorian calendar from 1 March 1600 to 28 February 2800, but the following day would be 1 March 2800 (RJ) or 29 February 2800 (G); this difference is denoted as '+1' in the table. 2900 is a leap year in Revised Julian, but not Gregorian: 29 February 2900 (RJ) is the same as 28 February 2900 (G) and the next day will be 1 March 2900 in both calendars - hence the '0' notation.

Revised Julian (RJ) minus Gregorian (G) date differences
Dates	RJ − G	Dates	RJ − G	Dates	RJ − G
Mar BC 1 – Feb AD 200	0	Mar AD 3600 – Feb AD 3800	+1	Mar AD 7200 – Feb AD 7400	+2
Mar AD 200 – Feb AD 400	−1	Mar AD 3800 – Feb AD 4000	0	Mar AD 7400 – Feb AD 7600	+1
Mar AD 400 – Feb AD 600	0	Mar AD 4000 – Feb AD 4200	+1	Mar AD 7600 – Feb AD 7800	+2
Mar AD 600 – Feb AD 800	−1	Mar AD 4200 – Feb AD 4400	0	Mar AD 7800 – Feb AD 8000	+1
Mar AD 800 – Feb AD 1100	0	Mar AD 4400 – Feb AD 4700	+1	Mar AD 8000 – Feb AD 8300	+2
Mar AD 1100 – Feb AD 1200	−1	Mar AD 4700 – Feb AD 4800	0	Mar AD 8300 – Feb AD 8400	+1
Mar AD 1200 – Feb AD 1500	0	Mar AD 4800 – Feb AD 5100	+1	Mar AD 8400 – Feb AD 8700	+2
Mar AD 1500 – Feb AD 1600	−1	Mar AD 5100 – Feb AD 5200	0	Mar AD 8700 – Feb AD 8800	+1
Mar AD 1600 – Feb AD 2800	0	Mar AD 5200 – Feb AD 6400	+1	Mar AD 8800 – Feb AD 10000	+2
Mar AD 2800 – Feb AD 2900	+1	Mar AD 6400 – Feb AD 6500	+2	Mar AD 10000 – Feb AD 10100	+3
Mar AD 2900 – Feb AD 3200	0	Mar AD 6500 – Feb AD 6800	+1	Mar AD 10100 – Feb AD 10400	+2
Mar AD 3200 – Feb AD 3300	+1	Mar AD 6800 – Feb AD 6900	+2	Mar AD 10400 – Feb AD 10500	+3
Mar AD 3300 – Feb AD 3600	0	Mar AD 6900 – Feb AD 7200	+1	Mar AD 10500 – Feb AD 10800	+2

In 900 Julian years there are 900/4 = 225 leap days. The Revised Julian leap rule omits seven of nine century leap years, leaving 225−7 = 218 leap days per 900-year cycle. Thus the calendar mean year is 365 + 218/900 days, but this is actually a double-cycle that reduces to 365 + 109/450 = 365.242̅ days, or exactly 365 days 5 hours 48 minutes 48 seconds, which is exactly 24 seconds shorter than the Gregorian mean year of 365.2425 days, so in the long term on average the Revised Julian calendar pulls ahead of the Gregorian calendar by one day in 3600 years.

The number of days per Revised Julian cycle = 900 × 365 + 218 = 328,718 days. Taking mod 7 leaves a remainder of 5, so like the Julian calendar, but unlike the Gregorian calendar, the Revised Julian calendar cycle does not contain a whole number of weeks. Therefore, a full repetition of the Revised Julian leap cycle with respect to the seven-day weekly cycle is seven times the cycle length = 7 × 900 = 6300 years.

== March equinox ==
The following is a scatter plot of actual astronomical northward equinox moments as numerically integrated by SOLEX 11 using DE421 mode with extended (80-bit) floating point precision, high integration order (18th order), and forced solar mass loss ("forced" means taken into account at all times). SOLEX can automatically search for northern hemisphere spring equinox moments by finding when the solar declination crosses the celestial equator northward, and then it outputs that data as the Terrestrial Time day and fraction of day relative to 1 January 2000 at noon (J2000.0 epoch). The progressive tidal slowing of the Earth rotation rate was accounted for by subtracting ΔT as calculated by the Espenak-Meeus polynomial set recommended at the NASA Eclipses web site to obtain the J2000.0-relative Universal Time moments, which were then properly converted to Revised Julian dates and Jerusalem local apparent time, taking local apparent midnight as the beginning of each calendar day. The year range of the chart was limited to dates before the year AD 4400: by then ΔT is expected to accumulate to about six hours, with an uncertainty of less than 2 1/2 hours.

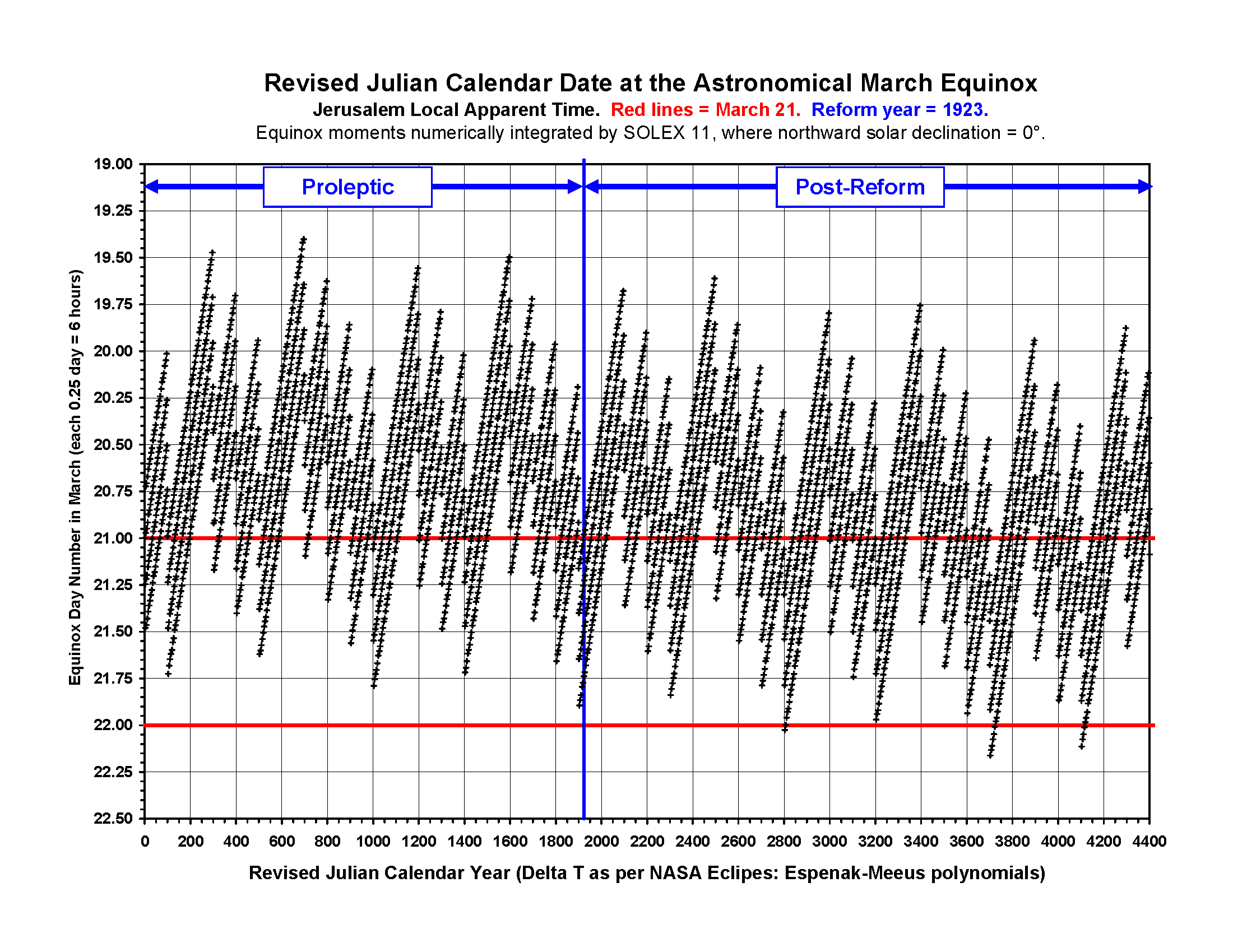
Equinox-Revised-Julian-Jerusalem-SOLEX-11

The chart shows that the long-term equinox drift of the Revised Julian calendar is quite satisfactory, at least until AD 4400. The medium-term wobble spans about two days because, like the Gregorian calendar, the leap years of the Revised Julian calendar are not smoothly spread: they occur mostly at intervals of four years but there are occasional eight-year gaps (at 7 out of 9 century years). Evidently each of the authorities responsible for the Gregorian and Revised Julian calendars, respectively, accepted a modest amount of medium-term equinox wobble for the sake of traditionally perceived leap rule mental arithmetic simplicity. Therefore, the wobble is essentially a curiosity that is of no practical or ritual concern.

== Adoption ==
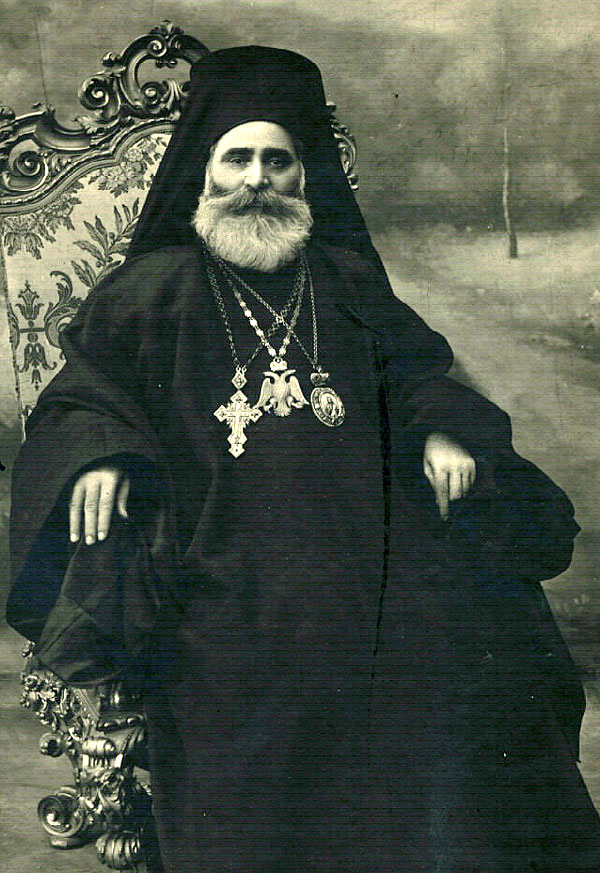
Patriarch Meletius IV of Constantinople, who convened the council that authorised the Revised Julian calendar

In 1923, the Revised Julian calendar was devised. Since then, several Eastern Orthodox Churches have introduced partial changes into their liturgical calendars. Those changes were based on the application of the Revised Julian calendar for the liturgical celebration of immovable feasts (including Christmas), thus reducing the use of the old Julian calendar to liturgical celebration of moveable feasts (feasts of the Easter cycle).

The new calendar has been adopted by Orthodox churches as follows:

- 1920: In Finland the Orthodox Church adopted the Gregorian calendar
- October 1921: Finland officially switched to the Gregorian calendar, including the Gregorian Paschalion
- 1923: Estonia (accepted the Gregorian calendar, including the Gregorian Paschalion, but in 1945 joined the Moscow Patriarchate and reverted to Julian; after re-establishing in 1996, the Estonian Apostolic Orthodox Church adopted the Revised Julian calendar in 2012)
- 10/23 March 1924: Constantinople, Cyprus and Greece
- 1/14 October 1924: The Polish Orthodox Church (Very few parishes changed - switched back on 15 June 2014, but individual parishes may use the Revised Julian calendar if they wish)
- 1/14 October 1924: Romania
- 1/14 October 1928: Alexandria and Antioch
- 12 April 1937: The Albanian Orthodox Church
- 20 December 1968: Bulgaria
- 1 September 2023: Orthodox Church of Ukraine

As of 2025, the Revised Julian Calendar has been adopted by 11 Churches, known as the New Calendarists:

1. Ecumenical Patriarchate of Constantinople (March 1924)
2. Greek Orthodox Patriarchate of Alexandria (in 1928)
3. Greek Orthodox Patriarchate of Antioch (in 1928)
4. Romanian Orthodox Church (later in 1924)
5. Church of Cyprus (March 1924)
6. Church of Greece (March 1924)
7. Albanian Orthodox Church (April 1937)
8. Bulgarian Orthodox Church (in December 1968)
9. Orthodox Church of the Czech Lands and Slovakia
10. Orthodox Church in America (excluding the Diocese of Sitka and Alaska, which remains on the Old Calendar)
11. Orthodox Church of Ukraine

The new calendar has not been adopted by the Old Calendarists, the Old Believers, and by the following Churches:

1. Greek Orthodox Patriarchate of Jerusalem
2. Georgian Orthodox Church
3. Serbian Orthodox Church
4. Russian Orthodox Church
5. Macedonian Orthodox Church
6. Polish Orthodox Church (has previously wavered between the two calendars)
7. the monasteries on Mount Athos.

In Eastern Orthodoxy, issues related to calendar reform did not produce break of communion or schisms between the mainstream churches, but they did cause disputes and internal schisms within some churches. The result of those conflicts was the emergence of the Old Calendarist movement, and consequent creation of separate churches, thus breaking the communion with those mother churches that accepted the calendar reform.

== Defense ==
The basic justification for the new calendar is the known errors of the Julian calendar, which will in the course of time lead to a situation in which those following the Julian calendar (in the Northern Hemisphere) will be reckoning the month of December (and the feast of Christ's Nativity) during the heat of summer, August and its feasts during the deep cold of winter, Easter during the autumn season, and the November feasts in the springtime. This would conflict with the Church's historic practice of celebrating Christ's birth on 25 December, a date chosen for a number of reasons. One of the reasons mentioned by Bennet is the time of the winter solstice, when the days begin to lengthen again as the physical sun makes its reappearance, along with the fact that Christ has traditionally been recognized by Christians as the metaphorical and spiritual sun who fulfills Malachi's prophetic words: "the sun of righteousness will shine with healing in its wings" (Malachi 4:2). The identification, based on this prophecy, of Jesus Christ as the "sun of righteousness" is found many times in writings of the early Church fathers and follows from many New Testament references linking Jesus with imagery of sun and light.

== Criticism ==
Critics see the change in calendar as an unwarranted innovation, influenced by Western society. They say that no sound theological reason has been given for changing the calendar, that the only reasons advanced are social. The proposal for change was introduced by Meletios Metaxakis, Ecumenical Patriarch of Constantinople, a patriarch whose canonical status has been disputed.

The argument is also made that since the use of the Julian calendar was implicit in the decision of the First Ecumenical Council at Nicaea (325), which standardized the calculation of the date of Easter, no authority less than an Ecumenical Council may change it. It is further argued that the adoption of the new calendar in some countries and not in others has broken the liturgical unity of the Eastern Orthodox churches, undoing the decision made by the council of bishops at Nicaea to decree that all local churches celebrate Easter on the same day. The emperor Constantine, writing to the bishops absent from the council to notify them of the decision, argued, "Think, then, how unseemly it is, that on the same day some should be fasting whilst others are seated at a banquet".

From a spiritual perspective, Old Calendarists also point to a number of miraculous occurrences that occur on the old calendar exclusively, such as the "descent of the cloud on the mount" on the feast of the Transfiguration. After the calendar change was instituted, the followers of the old calendar in Greece apparently witnessed the appearance of a cross in the sky, visible to thousands on the feast of the Exaltation of the Holy Cross, 1925, of which eyewitness accounts were recorded.

== See also ==
- Adoption of the Gregorian calendar
- French revolutionary calendar
- Old Calendarists
