= Eparchy of Alania =

Location
- Country: South Ossetia-Alania
- Headquarters: Tskhinvali

Information
- Denomination: Eastern Orthodox
- Sui iuris church: Orthodox Church of Greece (Holy Synod in Resistance)
- Established: 1991

Current leadership
- Bishop: George

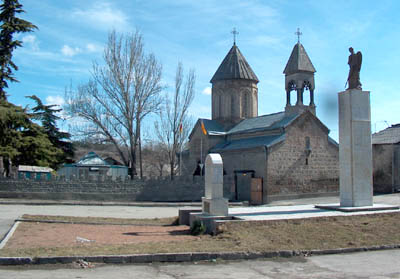
Church and monument to the victims of the Ossetian-Georgian conflict in Tskhinvali.

The Eparchy of Alania is a non-canonical orthodox eparchy created in South Ossetia after the dissolution of the Soviet Union in 1991. It has been attached to the Orthodox Church of Greece - Holy Synod in Resistance since 2003 after its break with the Russian Orthodox Church Outside of Russia.

== See also ==
- Eparchy of Bichvinta and Tskhum-Abkhazia
- Apostolic Autocephalous Orthodox Church of Georgia
