= Act of Canonical Communion with the Moscow Patriarchate =

2007 reunification of the Russian Orthodox Church

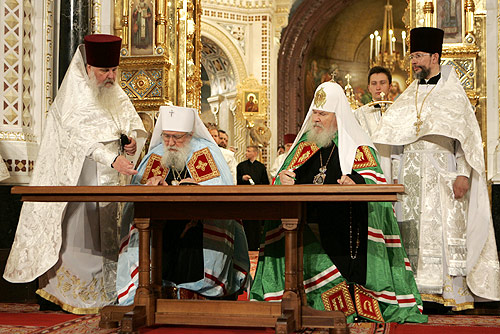
Metropolitan Laurus (left) and Patriarch Alexy II (right) sign the Act of Canonical Communion between the Moscow Patriarchate and the Russian Orthodox Church Outside Russia, 17 May 2007.

The Act of Canonical Communion of the Russian Orthodox Church Outside Russia with the Russian Orthodox Church Moscow Patriarchate (Russian: Акт о каноническом общении Русской Православной Церкви Заграницей с Русской Православной Церковью Московского Патриархата) reunited the two branches of the Russian Orthodox Church: the Russian Orthodox Church Outside Russia (ROCOR) and the Moscow Patriarchate. The accord was signed on 17 May 2007, which for the Eastern Orthodox Church in that year was the Feast of the Ascension of Jesus.

The ceremony which officially reestablished the fullness of communion between the Moscow Patriarchate, headed by Patriarch Alexy II, and ROCOR, headed by Metropolitan Laurus, took place at the Cathedral of Christ the Saviour in Moscow. The two church leaders met on the episcopal cathedra in the centre of the church. The Patriarch then read a prayer, which said in part:

As Thou liftedst Thy prayers to Thy Heavenly Father for Thy disciples, that they all be as one, gaze now with Thy merciful eyes upon Thy people, who have sinned and disobeyed Thy will, bless now our good intention and the unification of the Church to Thy Glory, create this Thyself, dampen all church temptations and divisions. Having given to us Thy law to love Thee, our God, and our neighbor, deliver us from all insult and disruption, may brotherly love reign among the children of our Church, in the Fatherland and in the diaspora. Grant that we may now enter Thy temple and bring Thy bloodless sacrifice, that we may be unified in one body through communion with Thy Life-creating Body and Thy Honorable Blood and bring praise with all our hearts to Thy ineffable love for mankind.

The two hierarchs then proceeded to the Ambo, where they signed the Act of Canonical Communion. After official statements by both hierarchs, the service continued with the joint celebration of the Divine Liturgy by clergy of both churches.

Among the dignitaries present was President of Russia Vladimir Putin, Mayor of Moscow Yuriy Luzhkov, presidential envoy Georgy Poltavchenko, and other government officials. Putin has been hailed by the primate of the Russian Orthodox Church, Patriarch of Moscow and all Rus' Alexy II, as instrumental in healing the 80-year schism between it and the Russian Orthodox Church outside Russia in May 2007.

== Reaction ==
Some opponents of the Act, who have left ROCOR, claim that the reconciliation of the Moscow Patriarchate and the Russian Orthodox Church Outside of Russia was the result of an intelligence operation of the Russian FSB.
