= Orthodox Church of Greece (Holy Synod in Resistance) =

Former Christian jurisdiction

The Holy Synod in Resistance (SiR; Demotic Greek: Ιερά Σύνοδος των Ενισταμένων, romanized: Ierá Sýnodos tōn Enistaménōn, full name Orthodox Church of the Traditional Ecclesiastical Calendar in Greece — Holy Synod in Resistance, Katharevousa: Ὀρθόδοξος Ἐκκλησία Πατρίου Ἐκκλησιαστικοῦ Ἡμερολογίου ἐν Ἑλλάδι · Ἱερὰ Σύνοδος τῶν Ἐνισταμένων, romanized: Orthódoxos Ekklēsía Patríou Ekklēsiastikoû Hēmerologíou en Hellási - Hierà Sýnodos tō̂n Enistaménōn) was an Old Calendarist denomination.

== History ==
The Holy Synod in Resistance was established in 1984.

The first Holy Synod President of the SiR is Metropolitan Cyprian of Oropos and Fili; he was elected to this position in 1985.

Metropolitan Cyprian of Oropos and Fili died in 2013. He was succeeded as president by Metropolitan Cyprian (Julis) (Cyprian II) of Oropos and Fili.

The SiR ceased to exist on March 18, 2014, when it merged into with the Church of the Genuine Orthodox Christians of Greece of the Chrysostomite synod (a Greek Old Calendarists group) under the presidency of Archbishop Kallinikos of Athens.

== Presidents ==
- Metropolitan Cyprian of Oropos and Fili (1985–2013)
- Metropolitan Cyprian (Julis) of Oropos and Fili (2013–14)
