= Koinonia =

Group cohesiveness among Christians

After the offering of the Mass at Engelbrekt Evangelical-Lutheran Church in Stockholm, the congregation engages in fellowship together with pastries and coffee served there (known as a fika in Swedish).

Koinonia (/ˌkɔɪnoʊˈniːə/), communion, or fellowship in Christianity is the bond uniting Christians as individuals and groups with each other and with Jesus Christ. It refers to group cohesiveness among Christians.

== Pre-Christian antecedents ==
Koinonia is a transliterated form of the Greek word κοινωνία, which refers to concepts such as fellowship, joint participation, partnership, the share which one has in anything, a gift jointly contributed, a collection, a contribution. In the Politics of Aristotle it is used to mean a community of any size from a single family to a polis. As a polis, it is the Greek for republic or commonwealth. In later Christianity it identifies the idealized state of fellowship and unity that should exist within the Christian church, the Body of Christ. This usage may have been borrowed from the early Epicureans—as it is used by Epicurus' Principal Doctrines 37–38.

The term communion, derived from Latin communio ('sharing in common'), is related.

== New Testament ==
The essential meaning of the koinonia embraces concepts conveyed in the English terms community, communion, joint participation, sharing and intimacy. Koinonia can therefore refer in some contexts to a jointly contributed gift. The word appears 19 times in most editions of the Greek New Testament. In the New American Standard Bible, it is translated "fellowship" twelve times, "sharing" three times, and "participation" and "contribution" twice each.

Koinonia appears once in the ancient Greek translation of the Old Testament known as the Septuagint, in Leviticus 6:2

It is found in 43 verses of the New Testament as a noun (koinōnia 17x, koinōnos 10x, sugkoinōnos 4x), in its adjectival (koinōnikos 1x), or verbal forms (koinōneō 8x, sugkoinōneō 3x). The word is applied, according to the context, to sharing or fellowship, or people in such relation, with:

- a divine nature (2 Peter 1:4), God (1 John 1:6), the Father and His Son (1 John 1:3), Jesus, Son of God (1 Corinthians 1:9), his sufferings (Philippians 3:10; 1 Peter 4:13), his future glory (1 Peter 5:1), the Holy Spirit (2 Corinthians 13:14; Philippians 2:1)
- the blood and the body of Christ (1 Corinthians 10:16), pagan sacrifices and gods (1 Corinthians 10:18–20)
- fellow Christians, their sufferings and the faith (Acts 2:42; Galatians 2:9; 1 John 1:3, 1:7; Hebrews 10:33; Revelation 1:9; Philemon 1:6, 1:17)
- a source of spiritual favours (Romans 11:17), the gospel (1 Corinthians 9:23), light and darkness (2 Corinthians 6:14)
- others' sufferings and consolation (2 Corinthians 1:7; Philippians 4:14), their evangelizing work (Philippians 1:5), their graces or privileges (Romans 15:27; Philippians 1:7), their material needs, to remedy which assistance is given (Romans 12:13, 15:26–27; 2 Corinthians 8:4, 9:13; Galatians 6:6; Philippians 4:15; 1 Timothy 6:18; Hebrews 13:16)
- the evil deeds of others (Matthew 23:30; Ephesians 5:11; 1 Timothy 5:22; 2 John 1:11; Revelation 18:4)
- the bodily human nature all have in common (Hebrews 2:14)
- a work partnership, secular or religious (Luke 5:10; 2 Corinthians 8:23)

Of these usages, Bromiley's International Standard Bible Encyclopedia selects as especially significant the following meanings:

I. Common life in general (only in Acts 2:42)
II. Communion between particular groups, the most remarkable instance of which was that between Jews and Gentiles
III. Communion in the Body and Blood of Christ
IV. Sharing in divine revelation and with God himself (1 John 1:1–7).

== Aspects ==
=== Sacramental meaning ===
The term "Holy Communion" refers to part of the Christian rite called the Eucharist, and informally the two terms are often used interchangeably. The Eucharist is the sacrament of communion with one another in the one body of Christ. This was the full meaning of eucharistic koinonia in the early Catholic Church. St. Thomas Aquinas wrote, "the Eucharist is the sacrament of the unity of the Church, which results from the fact that many are one in Christ."

=== Between churches ===
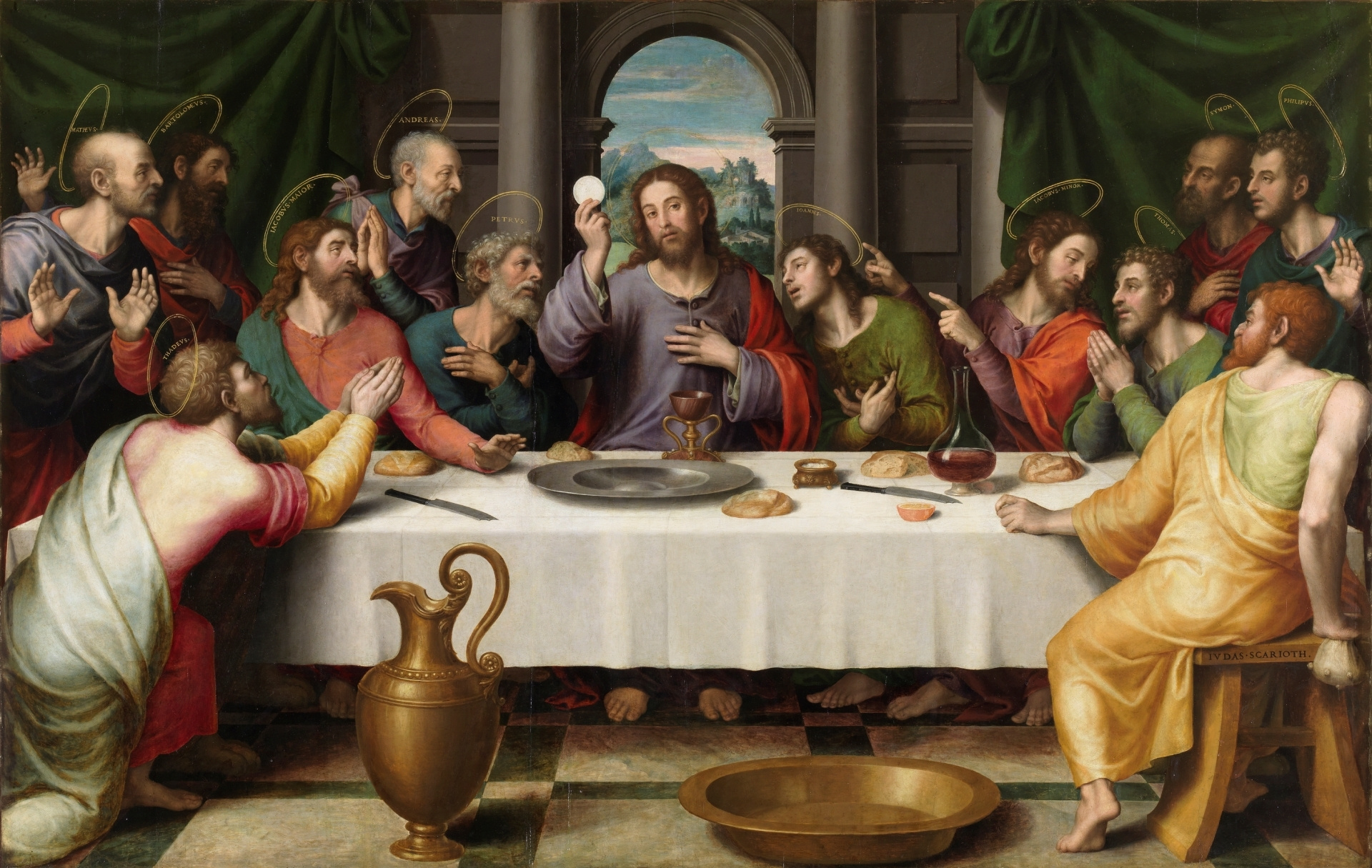
The Eucharist has been a key theme in the depictions of the Last Supper in Christian art, as in this 16th-century Juan de Juanes painting.

By metonymy, the term is used of a group of Christian churches that have this close relationship of communion with each other. An example is the Anglican Communion.

If the relationship between the churches is complete, involving fullness of "those bonds of communion – faith, sacraments and pastoral governance – that permit the Faithful to receive the life of grace within the Church", it is called full communion. However, the term "full communion" is frequently used in a broader sense, to refer instead to a relationship between Christian churches that are not united, but have only entered into an arrangement whereby members of each church have certain rights within the other.

If a church recognizes that another church, with which it lacks bonds of pastoral governance, shares with it some of the beliefs and essential practices of Christianity, it may speak of "partial communion" between it and the other church.

=== Between the living and the dead ===
The communion of saints is the relationship that, according to the belief of Christians, exists between them as people made holy by their link with Christ. That this relationship extends not only to those still in earthly life, but also to those who have gone past death to be "away from the body and at home with the Lord" (2 Corinthians 5:8) is a belief among some Christians. Their communion is believed to be "a vital fellowship between all the redeemed, on earth and in the next life, that is based on the common possession of the divine life of grace that comes to us through the risen Christ".

Since the word rendered in English as "saints" can mean not only "holy people" but also "holy things", "communion of saints" also applies to the sharing by members of the church in the holy things of faith, sacraments (especially the Eucharist), and the other spiritual graces and gifts that they have in common.

The term "communion" is applied to sharing in the Eucharist by partaking of the consecrated bread and wine, an action seen as entering into a particularly close relationship with Christ. Sometimes the term is applied not only to this partaking but to the whole of the rite or to the consecrated elements.

=== Between individual Christians ===
A Christian fellowship is a community, social club, benefit society, and/or a fraternal organization whether formal or informal of Christians that worship, pray, cooperate, volunteer, socialize, and associate with each other on the foundation of their shared Christian faith. Members of Christian fellowships may or may not be part of the same church congregations or denominations, although many are associated with a given local church congregation (in turn possibly associated with a given denomination) or an interdenominational group of several local area congregations, some are established as parachurch voluntary associations or student societies, and others form out of casual non-denominational friend groups/social groups among individual Christians in some way affiliated with universities, colleges, schools, other educational institutions, community centers, places of employment, or at any other place, entity, or among neighbors and acquaintances, made up of people who worship, congregate, and socialize together based on shared religious beliefs.

== See also ==
- Christian communism
- Religious identity, the sense of membership in a religious group and its importance to one's self-concept

== Bibliography ==
- NAS Exhaustive Concordance of the Bible with Hebrew-Aramaic and Greek Dictionaries. Lockman Foundation. 1998 [1981].
- Bromiley, Geoffrey W. (1979). The International Standard Bible Encyclopedia. Grand Rapids, Michigan: William B. Eerdmans Publishing Co.
- Lynch, Robert Porter; Prozonic, Ninon (2006). "How the Greeks created the First Golden Age of Innovation" (Microsoft Word). p. 14.
- Richards, Lawrence O. (1985). Expository Dictionary of Bible Words. Grand Rapids, Michigan: Zondervan Corporation.
- Thayer, Joseph H. (1885). Greek–English Lexicon of the New Testament. Grand Rapids, Michigan: Zondervan Publishing House.
