= Rožupe Parish =

Parish of Latvia

- parish of Latvia
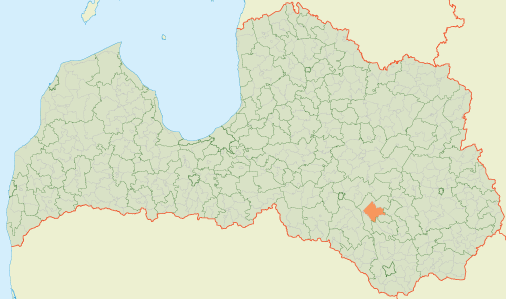
- Coordinates: 56°22′01″N 26°20′24″E
- Country: Latvia

Population (1 January 2026)
  - Total: 1,001

Rožupe Parish (Latvian: Rožupes pagasts) is one of the administrative territories of Līvāni Municipality in the Latgale region of Latvia. It is bordered by Līvāni town, along with Jersika, Sutri, Rudzāti and Turki parishes in its own municipality; Rožkalni and Upmala Parishes in Vārkava Municipality, and, in the Preiļi Municipality, Sauna Parish.
