= Aleksandrs Kudrjašovs =

Primate of the Latvian Orthodox Church

His Eminence Alexander
- Metropolitan of Riga and all Latvia
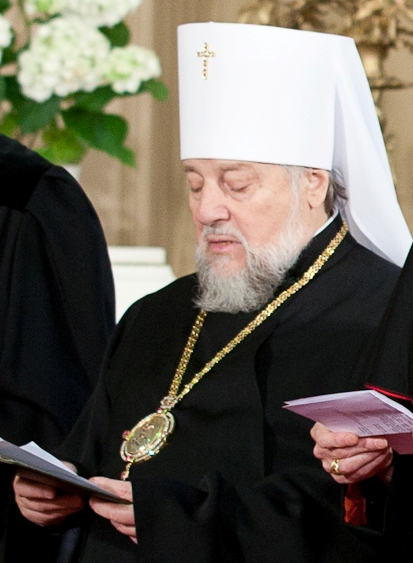
- Alexander in 2011
- Native name: Aleksandrs Kudrjašovs
- Church: Latvian Orthodox Church
- See: Riga
- Installed: 27 October 1990
- Predecessor: Leonid (Polyakov)

Orders
- Ordination: 1982
- Consecration: 23 July 1989

Personal details
- Born: 3 October 1939 (age 86) Rudzāti, Rudzāti Parish, Latvia
- Denomination: Eastern Orthodox Church
- Education: Moscow Theological Academy, University of Daugavpils

Metropolitan Aleksandrs (born 3 October 1939) is the primate of the Latvian Orthodox Church and the Metropolitan of Riga and all Latvia.

== Life ==
Aleksandrs was born on October 3, 1939, in Rudzāti, Latvia. He graduated in 1964 from the University of Daugavpils, he was a teacher in the village of Kalupe, and a Russian language teacher at the Riga English Gymnasium.

In 1982, he was ordained as a priest in the Church of Elijah, in the town of Ust'-Syny (Усть-Сыны), Perm, and in 1983, he was appointed as head priest of the Church of the Holy Transfiguration in Riga. In 1989, he graduated from Moscow Theological Academy and became a monk and a Archimandrite. Since October 1990, he has been serving as the metropolitan of the Latvian Orthodox Church.

In 2002, he received the Order of the Three Stars second class. In 2010, he received Cross of Recognition first class, and he was awarded with the Order of the Holy Martyr of Riga Archbishop John first class.
