= Russian Orthodox Autonomous Church =

Russian Orthodox church body headquartered in Suzdal, Russia

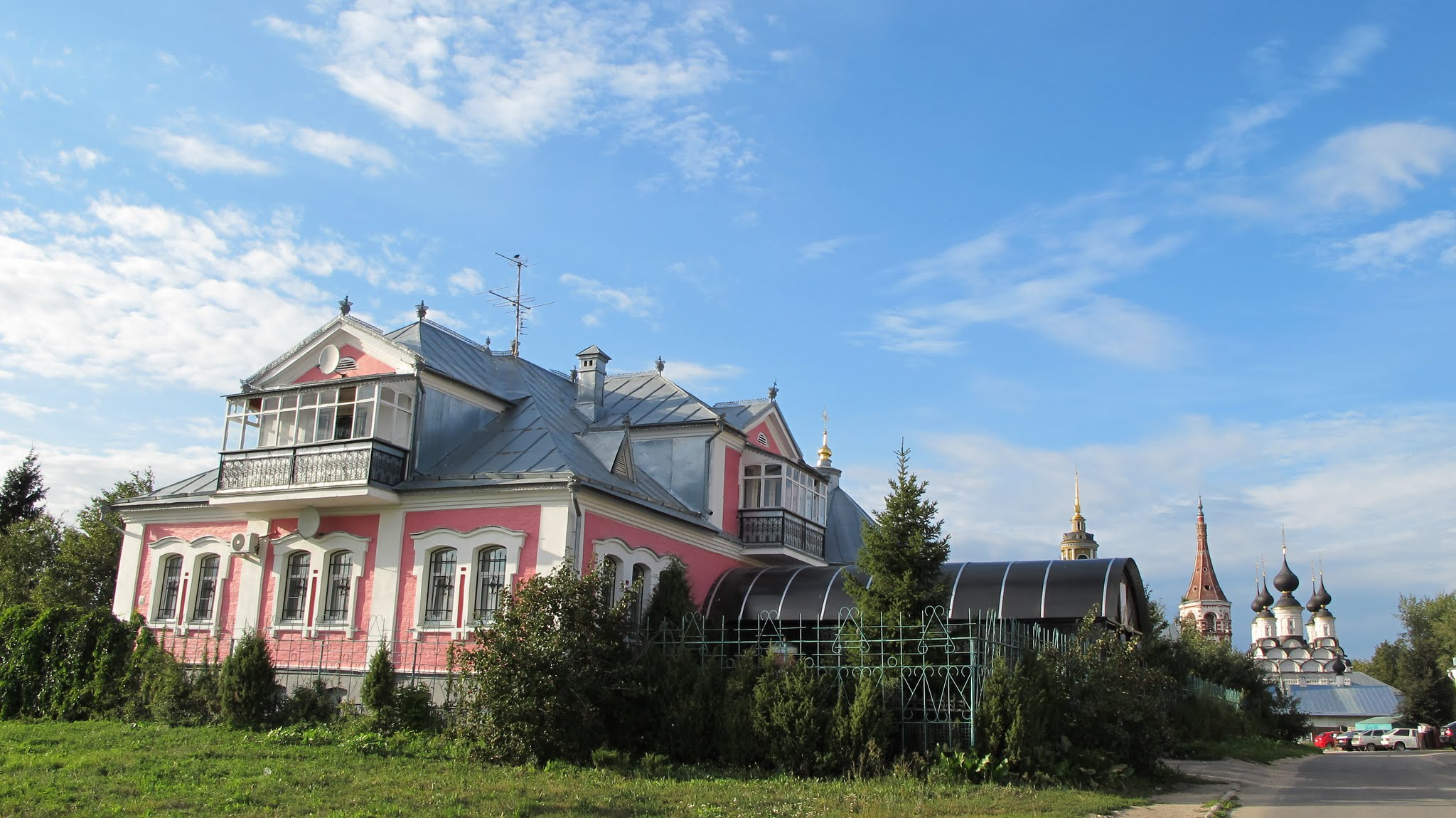
- Type: Eastern Orthodox
- Classification: Independent Eastern Orthodox
- Orientation: True Orthodoxy
- Primate: Metropolitan Theodore (Gineyevsky)
- Language: Church Slavonic
- Liturgy: Byzantine Rite
- Headquarters: Suzdal, Russia
- Founder: Valentin Rusantsov
- Independence: 1995
- Recognition: Unrecognized (see True Orthodoxy)
- Separated from: Russian Orthodox Church Outside Russia

The Russian Orthodox Autonomous Church (ROAC, Russian: Российская православная автономная церковь, РПАЦ; until 1998 it was called the Russian Orthodox Free Church, ROFC, Russian: Российская православная свободная церковь, РПСЦ) is a Russian Orthodox church body headquartered in Suzdal, Russia. ROAC identifies as part of True Orthodoxy. In the Moscow Patriarchate, the ROCOR, and the mass media, it has the designation "Suzdal Schism" (Russian: Суздальский раскол).

The beginning of this body was laid in 1990, when the cleric of the Moscow Patriarchate, Archimandrite Valentin (Rusantsov), was admitted to the Russian Orthodox Church Outside of Russia (ROCOR) and began to create new parishes in his subordination, receiving the rank of bishop of Suzdal in 1991. In 1995, Bishops Valentin (Rusantsov), Theodore (Gineyevsky), Seraphim (Zinchenko) and their clergy and parishes separated from the ROCOR. The Suzdal diocese of Valentin (Rusantsov) became the center of the new church. The 2000s were characterized by the weakening of the ROAC and a reduction in the number of parishes and laity due to various conflicts and schisms. In 2009, the process of seizure of historical churches, previously transferred to the use of the ROAC, began. This process was completed in 2019, when the ROAC had no such churches left. In March 2015 Federal Bailiffs Service officials took two relics from a ROAC cathedral and gave them to the Russian Orthodox Church.

The ROAC as of 2017 consisted of: 35 officially registered parishes; 30 parishes operating as religious groups; 20-30 illegal ("catacomb") parishes; 10 bishops, 40 priests, 20 nuns and approximately 5,000 laypeople.

The ROAC reject the "Sergianist heresy" and holds that the sacraments of the Moscow Patriarchate (considered distinct from the Russian Orthodox Church that existed before the Bolshevik revolution) are anathema or invalid and ineffectual for salvation. The ROAC upholds in principle and emphasizes the ROCOR 1983 anathema against ecumenism.

== History ==
=== Formation ===
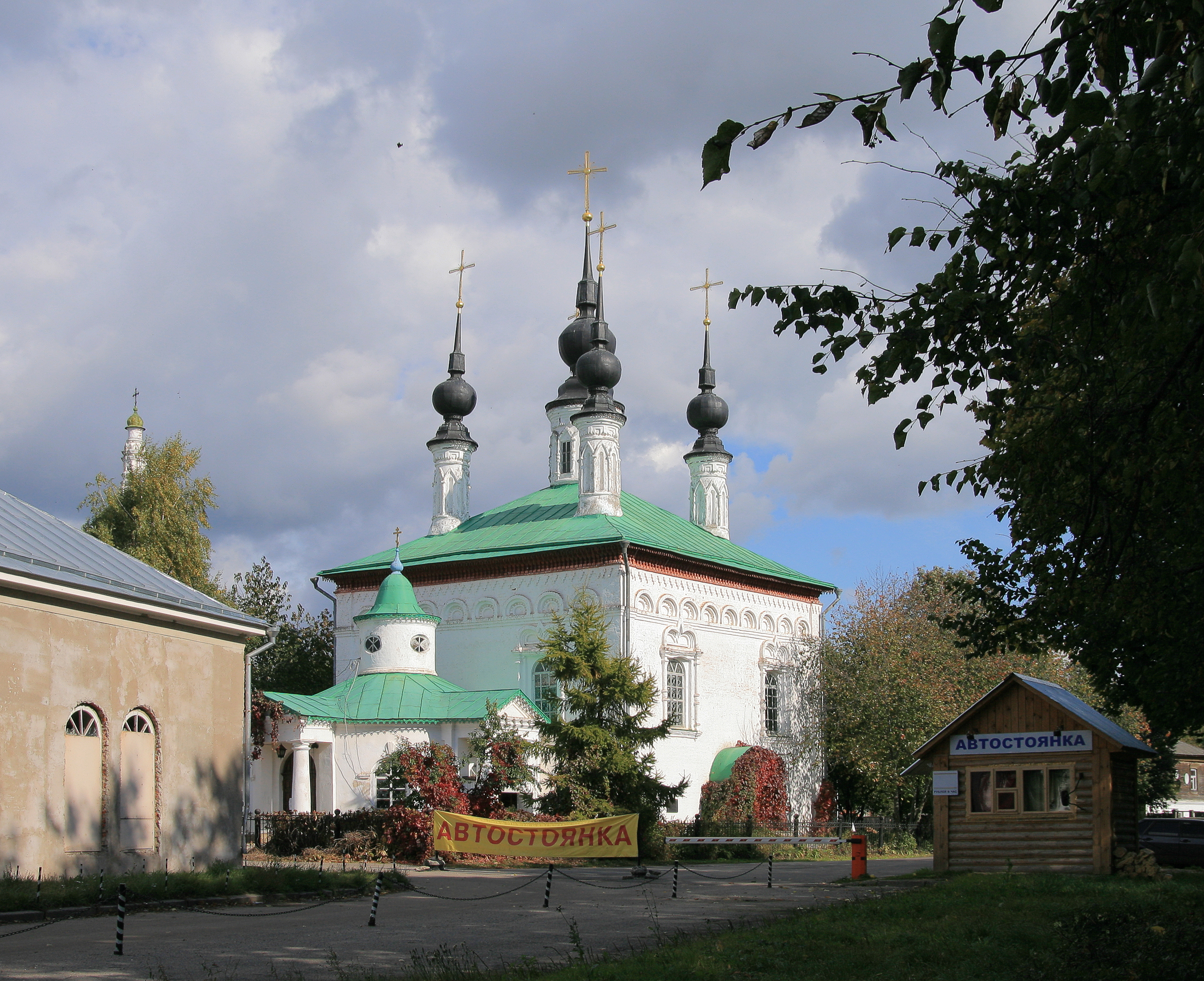
Tsar-Constantine Church in Suzdal. It was a cathedral of ROFC/ROAC during 1990-2009

At the beginning of 1990, the clergy and the parish of the Tsar-Constantine Church in Suzdal, headed by Archimandrite Valentin (Rusantsov), who was banned from serving, decided to transfer to the ROCOR. The appeal of the Suzdal community to the Synod of Bishops of the ROCOR received a wide resonance in the church and secular society. The community that "went its own way" was supported by the democratic media, some deputies of the Supreme Council of Russia. Archimandrite Valentin and the community received significant assistance in the days when they had already left the ROC, but had not yet been officially accepted into the ROCOR, from the nonconformist TV program "The Fifth Wheel", as well as the Moscow newspaper "Moskovskiye Novosti" and the magazine "Ogonyok". On March 21 of the same year, the Synod of Bishops of the ROCOR received Archimandrite Valentin, clerics and parishioners of this parish into the ROCOR. On April 6, Archimandrite Valentin led his first divine service in the Tsar-Constantine Church as a cleric of the ROCOR. On May 15, 1990, the ROCOR Bishops' Council, despite the disagreement of a number of bishops, priests and laity, adopted the "Regulation on Free Parishes", which presupposed the beginning of the legal existence of ROCOR parishes on the territory of the USSR, that is, on the territory under the jurisdiction of the Moscow Patriarchate. The new structure became known as the "Russian Orthodox Free Church". The admission of Archimandrite Valentine to the jurisdiction of the ROCOR became an example for several dozen parish communities in various regions of the USSR. The most active supporters of the creation of legal canonical structures of the ROCOR in Russia, alternative to the Moscow Patriarchate, in the late 1980s were dissidents — both ecclesiastical and secular — who formed a democratic opposition to the Soviet regime, advocating the speedy dismantling of the entire Soviet system, including the "Soviet church".

At the same time, the ROCOR already had a bishop in the USSR, Bishop Lazar (Zhurbenko), who was distrustful of the new Russian government, was not in the mood to "come out of the catacombs" and skeptically regarded the mass transition of the "patriarchal" clergy to the ROCOR, while Archimandrite Valentin sought to expose the Moscow Patriarchate as actively as possible and call for Orthodox Christians to join the ROCOR. On the basis of different approaches to the forms of ROCOR church ministry in Russia, serious disagreements arose between Bishop Lazar and Archimandrite Valentin. Bishop Lazar began to avoid trips to Suzdal. On October 4, 1990, the Synod of Bishops of the ROCOR appointed Archimandrite Valentin (Rusantsov) as Exarch of the Russian Orthodox Free Church and Managing affairs at the Suzdal Diocesan Administration with the right to independently accept clergy and communities from the Moscow Patriarchate. Bishops' Council of the Moscow Patriarchate, held on October 25–27, 1990, in this regard, issued an appeal "To the archpastors, pastors and all faithful children of the Russian Orthodox Church", in which he called for the preservation of the unity of the Church, and appealed to the foreign hierarchs with a fraternal request not to create new obstacles to the unity of the Church. This request was not heard. On February 10, 1991, in the Church of the Holy Righteous Job the Long-Suffering in Brussels, Archimandrite Valentin (Rusantsov) was consecrated bishop of Suzdal and Vladimir. In the same year, the ROCOR's Diocese of Suzdal was registered with the Ministry of Justice of the Russian Federation. All this has further exacerbated the contradictions between Valentin (Rusantsov) and Lazar (Zhurbenko). By the middle of 1991, communion in prayer between these two hierarchs ceased. Realizing the impossibility of creating normal church administrative structures in Russia and striving to facilitate the possibility of joining the ROCOR as many clerics of the Moscow Patriarchate as possible, the Synod of Bishops of the ROCOR proclaimed the USSR a "mission territory", giving each of the bishops the right to establish parishes in any region of the country. Gradually, clear principles were revealed that divided the Russian Orthodox Free Church into Valentinian and Lazarite parts. As a rule, legal parishes (usually with their own churches) from the Moscow Patriarchate passed to Bishop Valentin, while Archbishop Lazar headed communities that remained in illegal or semi-legal position.

The desire to overcome the division between the Russian bishops led to the appearance in the ROCOR Synod of the idea of creating a structure in Russia, which by its very position would be "above the fray." In January 1992, the Synod sent to Russia the vicar of the Western European Diocese of ROCOR, Bishop Barnabas (Prokofiev) of Cannes with the assignment to organize a permanent Synodal compound in Moscow, which would exercise the authority of the Synod of Bishops of ROCOR in Russia. Bishop Barnabas' rapprochement with the far-right "Pamyat" Society caused irreparable damage to the ROCOR reputation in Russia. The interference of Bishop Barnabas, or rather his secretary Archpriest Alexei Averyanov, in the affairs of other Russian ROCOR dioceses, the acceptance of clergy banned by other bishops, the actual management of parishes subordinate to other ROCOR bishops, and finally the subordination of Lazar and Valentin to Bishop Barnabas, which they did not recognize, led to an even greater discord in the ROCOR church administration in Russia. By the end of 1992, at least one hundred parishes in different regions of Russia and the "near abroad" were subordinate to Suzdal, but already in 1993 there was a decline in the activities of the ROCOR in Russia; internal ideological and personal conflicts lead Russian ROCOR structures into a state of disorganization. The Moscow Patriarchate clergy heretofore sympathizing with the ROCOR, have cooled down their desire to move to its jurisdiction. Some of those who came from the Moscow Patriarchate were disappointed about the "free church". Some, due to pressure from local authorities or the Moscow Patriarchate, some, for ideological reasons, return to the latter, some go to "independent" jurisdictions.

=== Separation from ROCOR ===
In July 1993, Archbishop Lazar announced the administrative separation from the Synod of Bishops and the independent management of the diocese under the pretext of the Patriarch Tikhon and the supreme church administration Decree No 362 on November 20, 1920. In response, the ROCOR Synod of Bishops deprived Archbishop Lazar of the right to serve independently and manage parishes, and also dismissed Bishop Valentine, who refused to come to the Bishops' Council in 1993 "for health reasons", and in fact in protest against the Synod's connivance with the violations made by Bishop Barnabas. Despite the prohibitions, both dismissed bishops continued to manage the parishes that remained in their subordination, considering the dismissal itself to be an absolutely non-canonical measure, however, a fairly large group of parishes (almost all the legal parishes of Archbishop Lazarus and several valentinian ones) recognizes the validity of the decisions of the Council and passes into the direct management of the First Hierarch of the ROCOR, which was nominal character. In March 1994, in Suzdal, Archbishop Lazar and Bishop Valentin, who had previously seemed irreconcilable antagonists, announced the formation of a joint Provisional Supreme Church Administration of the Russian Orthodox Free Church. Archbishop Lazar was elected Chairman of the Provisional Supreme Church Administration, and his deputy, who actually became the head of the new body of church authority, Bishop Valentin, elevated by Archbishop Lazar to the rank of archbishop. The first acts of the Provisional Supreme Church Administration were the ordination of new bishops from among the closest collaborators of the founders of the Provisional Supreme Church Administration: on the part of Bishop Valentin — Bishops Theodore (Gineyevsky) (March 19, 1994) and Seraphim (Zinchenko) (March 20, 1994), on the part of Archbishop Lazar — Bishop Agathangel (Pashkovsky) (March 27, 1994). April 4–5, 1994 The Synod of Bishops of the ROCOR recognized the creation of the Suzdal Provisional Supreme Church Administration as illegal, banning Archbishop Lazar and Bishop Valentin from the priesthood and not recognizing the ordination of new bishops, as well as all other decisions of the Provisional Supreme Church Administration.

Everyone was aware of the abnormality of the division that had arisen, and steps were being taken towards rapprochement on both sides. The result of these efforts was reconciliation, which took place at the Bishops' Council in the Lesninsky Monastery in December 1994. The "Reconciliation Act" was signed. The CCU was abolished and its decisions were recognized as invalid (so Valentin (Rusantsov) refused the rank of archbishop), and the ordained bishops had to take the Episcopal oath to the Synod, after which they could be recognized as legitimate bishops. The council in Lesninsky convent established a new order for the management of Russian ROCOR parishes: the status of Russia as a "mission territory" was abolished, the division into six dioceses was introduced according to the geographical principle: 1) Moscow, 2) St. Petersburg and North Russia, 3) Odessa and South Russia, 4) Suzdal, 5) Black Sea and Kuban, 6) Siberia. Instead of the abolished Provisional Supreme Church Administration, the Council established the Bishops' Conference of the Russian Eminences, subordinated to the Synod of Bishops of the ROCOR. All Russian parishes were transferred to the jurisdiction of the Bishops' Conference, and therefore the Synodal Representative in Russia was abolished. According to the new administrative division of the Russian dioceses, a significant part of the parishes subordinated to the Suzdal diocese were to go under the omophorion of other bishops. At the end of January 1995, in Suzdal, the Russian bishops of the ROCOR gathered for their First meeting. The Russian clergy and laity gathered at the Meeting expressed their categorical disagreement with the new division of dioceses, since it entailed the re-registration of many parishes, which was fraught with the loss of all registration, as well as churches. On the basis of this, it was decided at the Meeting that the final decision on the territorial division should be made by all Russian bishops after some necessary time. Disagreement was also expressed with some other points of the Act.

In February 1995, newly ordained bishops Theodore (Gineyevsky) and Agathangel (Pashkovsky) arrived at the Synod of Bishops of the ROCOR. They hoped that their approval would be a formality, but they were given strict conditions: to recognize the conviction in absentia and the prohibition by the Synod of ROCOR of Lazar and Valentin "until repentance" for not recognizing the "Act of Reconciliation", and to remain on probation in the United States. Only after this was to be the final recognition of the newly ordained bishops. Such conditions were rejected by Bishops Theodore and Agathangel, after which they returned to Russia. On March 12, 1995, an emergency meeting of the "Russian Eminences" was held in Suzdal, consisting of five bishops: Lazar (Zhurbenko), Valentin (Rusantsov), Theodore (Gineyevsky), Seraphim (Zinchenko), Agathangel (Pashkovsky), who "in view of the increased illegal claims of the Synod of Bishops and the First Hierarch of ROCOR for the appropriation of by them of the All-Russian Church Authority and violations by them of the Holy Canons of the Church, disregard of the Resolutions of the All-Russian Council of 1917-18, the Decree of St. Patriarch Tikhon and the precepts of St. The New Martyrs and Confessors of Russia", determined "The Act signed at the Bishops' Council in France in November 1994 <...> completely denounced and lost all meaning", resumed the work of the Provisional Supreme Church Administration. The definition of the Bishops' Council of the ROCOR of February 9/22 and "the claims contained therein to the leadership of the entire Russian Church by the Synod of Bishops and the First Hierarch of the ROCOR" were qualified as "abuse of power in violation of the Holy Canons and Regulations on ROCOR". The prohibition in the ministry imposed on these bishops was decided "not to recognize and not to fulfill."

=== Second half of the 1990s ===
On March 14, 1995, by the decision of the Provisional Supreme Church Administration, the following bishops were elected: Archimandrite Seraphim (Novakovsky), Archimandrite Arsenius (Kiselyov), Archimandrite Alexander (Mironov), Hegumen Victor (Kontoruzov). In April 1995, Alexander (Mironov) was ordained bishop of Kazan and Mari, and Arsenius (Kiselyov) was ordained bishop of Tula and Bryansk. At the same time, Archbishop Lazar (Zhurbenko) and Bishop Agathangel (Pashkovsky), who repented before and returned to ROCOR, are separated from the Provisional Supreme Church Administration. Agathangel (Pashkovsky) finally accepted the conditions set for him and lived for some time in the United States. On May 8, 1995, by the decision of the Provisional Supreme Church Administration, Archbishop Lazar (Zhubenko), in connection with his return to the ROCOR, was dismissed from his post by the chairman of the Provisional Supreme Church Administration. Archbishop Valentin (Rusantsov) of Suzdal and Vladimir was elected chairman instead of Lazar. Bishop Theodore (Gineyevsky) of Borisovo was elected Deputy Chairman. Archpriest Andrey Osetrov was elected Secretary.

Metropolitan Vitaly (Ustinov) and the members of the ROCOR Synod of Bishops refused to understand aspirations of elderly Bishop Gregory (Grabbe) to support the Russian bishops and clergy who created the Provisional Supreme Church Administration. Bishop Gregory from the very beginning was a supporter of the opening of ROCOR parishes in USSR, made a trip to Suzdal from May 16 to 24, 1995, where he participated in divine services, meetings of the Synod of Bishops of the ROCOR, having rendered this visit invaluable support to Bishop Valentin and the clergy of the former Suzdal-Vladimir Diocese of the ROCOR who supported him. The interview given by Bishop Gregory after the celebration of the liturgy in the St. Nicholas Church of Suzdal on May 22, 1995, was published in "Suzdal Diocesan Vedomosti", the print organ of the ROFC, and in a number of secular media. On June 21, 1995, Hegumen Victor (Kontuzorov), previously accepted into the ROFC from the Latvian Orthodox Church, was ordained Bishop of Daugavpils, after which the parishes headed by him actually became a diocese of the ROFC. In 1996, the church became known as the Latvian Free Orthodox Church.

On June 22, 1995, the Provisional Supreme Church Administration decided: "Due to the fact that for a number of years the ROCOR Synod of Bishops did not listen to the voice of the Russian Bishops, clergy and laity of the ROFC, henceforth all the resolutions of the Synod of Bishops of the ROCOR will not recognize and will not execute. All parishes of the ROFC should be informed about this decision of the Provisional Supreme Church Administration." In the same year, the Provisional Supreme Church Administration ordered to stop commemorating the first hierarch of the ROCOR Metropolitan Vitaly (Ustinov) in the temples subordinate to him. In January 1996, the Provisional Supreme Church Administration was renamed the Synod of Bishops. In September 1996, at the Bishops' Council of the ROCOR, Bishop Valentin (Rusantsov) was deprived of his holy dignity.

Soon the first schism appeared in the ROFC. In the summer of 1996, Bishop Arsenius (Kiselyov) of Bryansk and Tula appealed to the Synod of Bishops of the ROCOR with a request to accept him into the ROCOR on the same conditions on which Bishop Agathangel (Pashkovsky) was admitted in February 1995. After reviewing Bishop Arsenius case, the Synod offered him tougher conditions: three years of repentance in a remote Australian monastery and, possibly, a subsequent appointment to one of the foreign chairs. Bishop Arsenius rejected these conditions, referring to the impossibility of a long separation from his flock. After returning to Russia, he gathered the diocesan congress of his diocese, at which it was decided to switch to self-government, referring at the same time, as earlier the ROFC, to the decree of Patriarch Tikhon and the Supreme Church Administration under him for No 362. Soon another bishop of the ROFC joined him — Bishop Alexander of Kazan and Mari. Together they joined the Russian True Orthodox Church formed in the fall of 1996 by the former subdeacon of the ROCOR Alexander Mikhalchenkov. Reacting to this, the Synod of the ROFC in 1997 defrocked both bishops.

In 1997, Archimandrite Peter (Kucher) came under the jurisdiction of the Russian Orthodox Church together with the community of former residents of the Zadonsk monastery. He attempted to organize a monastery within the Suzdal Diocese. in the village of Omutskoye near Suzdal, but a month later he returned to the Moscow Patriarchate with repentance. In 1998, the parish of Archangel Michael in Guildford, Great Britain, headed by the famous publicist Vladimir Moss, was accepted into the ROFC from the ROCOR. Thus, the ROFC began to create its canonical structures on the territory of the foreign dioceses of the ROCOR. In connection with the adoption of the law "On Freedom of Conscience and on Religious Associations", the Suzdal Synod was re—registered in October 1998, adopting a new official name - the Russian Orthodox Autonomous Church (ROAC). In September 1999, the parish of the Venerable Martyr Grand Duchess Elizabeth Feodorovna in St. Petersburg, whose de facto leader was the famous theologian and patrologist Basil Lourié, moved to the ROAC from the ROCOR. Basil Lourié was soon ordained a priest in Suzdal, and then became a monk with the name Gregory. At the same time, another parish of the ROAC was formed in St. Petersburg, which was based on members of the St. Petersburg Center for Spiritual Enlightenment. These parishes united parishioners from remote places of the Leningrad region and some other cities of Russia, where new communities were gradually formed. On May 24, 1999, Anthony (Aristov) was consecrated bishop of Yaransk and Vyatka, who later cared catacomb communities of the Vyatka region and the Middle Volga region.

=== 2000s ===
In total, the ROAC in early 2000s had about 60 registered parishes and over 100 "catacomb" ones. The clergy consisted of 9 bishops and about 50 priests. As Gregory (Lourié) noted, "The ROAC as of 2000 represented one Diocese of Suzdal, which was compact within the Suzdal district of the Vladimir Oblast and extremely diffuse in the CIS and far abroad. Despite the fact that some of the bishops of that time had diocesan titles, the center of actual diocesan power remained alone — in Suzdal". Among the famous people who belonged to the ROAC at that time were: publicist and memoirist, rector of the ROAC Church at the Golovinskoye cemetery Archpriest Mikhail Ardov; patrologist, historian, publicist Hieromonk Gregory (Lourié); historian, orientalist and publicist Alexei Muravyov; publicist Yegor Kholmogorov. All of them were actively published in the press and on the Internet, advocating for the ROAC. The ROAC also enjoyed the support of political strategist Gleb Pavlovsky. In order to strengthen their own position, the ROAC began to canonize saints. On November 22–23, 2000, as part of the celebrations dedicated to the VIII Congress of the clergy, monastics and laity of the Diocese of Suzdal of the ROAC, the glorification of the "reverend wives of Diveyevo" — ascetics who labored in the Diveyevo Convent during the life of St. Seraphim of Sarov and in the XIX — early XX century took place. On April 30 — May 1, 2001, celebrations were held at the Tsar-Constantine Cathedral on the occasion of the glorification of the Metropolitan of New York and Eastern America, the third first hierarch of ROCOR Philaret (Voznesensky) by the ROAC as saint. In 2001, Theological and pastoral courses for the training of clergy were founded at the Suzdal Diocesan Administration.

The ROAC continued to replenish its own episcopate. On November 26, 2000 Hieromonk Ambrose (Yepifanov) was ordained bishop of Khabarovsk, vicar of the Suzdal diocese. On February 6, 2001, Gerontius (Ryndenko) was ordained bishop of Sukhodol. On March 15, 2001, by the decision of the Synod of Bishops of the ROAC, Archbishop Valentin (Rusantsov) was awarded the title of metropolitan with the right to wear two panagias. On April 10, 2001, Metropolitan Valentin (Rusantsov) received into the ROAC the parish of St. Basil of Ryazan in Ryazan (with the Church of the Epiphany of the XVII century), the Orthodox Brotherhood of St. James the Apostle, brother of the Lord in the flesh (Moscow) and the Orthodox Brotherhood of Tsarevich-Martyr Alexy (Moscow). Among those who transferred was the journalist and publicist Alexander Soldatov. On July 26–27, 2001, Dionysius McGowan was ordained a deacon and priest, becoming the first cleric of the ROAC in the USA. On August 25 of the same year, Archimandrite Gregory (Abu-Asaly) with a small monastic community was admitted to the ROAC from the Kallinikite Synod. On December 2, 2001, he was ordained Bishop of Denver, vicar of the Diocese of Suzdal. In December 2001, Bishop Anthony (Grabbe), who lived in the USA, was received into the ROAC, who received ordination in one of the Greek old-style jurisdictions and was accepted as a retired bishop, and Archpriest Vladimir Shishkov, who transferred from the ROCOR. On November 18, 2002, an independent Diocese of Denver and Colorado was established within the ROAC, which included all parishes of North and South America, and Bishop Gregory was appointed its ruling bishop. On July 17, 2003, Archimandrite Sebastian (Zhatkov), rector of the parishes of the ROAC in Chelyabinsk and the Chelyabinsk Oblast, was ordained Bishop of Chelyabinsk, vicar of the Suzdal diocese. November 24, 2003 Irenarchus (Nonchin) was ordained bishop of Tula and Bryansk.

In the second half of 2001 — early 2002, the Russian Orthodox Autonomous Church was shaken by a powerful crisis: 5 clerics of the ROAC, led by Archpriest Andrei Osetrov, former secretary of the ROAC Synod of Bishops, accused Valentin (Rusantsov) of child molestation. This group of clergymen referred their accusations to the prosecutor's office, and a criminal case was opened. Andrey Osetrov sent telegrams to the bishops of the ROAC before the start of the synod informing them that Metropolitan Valentin had been arrested and would be sentenced. The clerics who supported Andrei Osetrov were defrocked by the decision of the ecclesiastical court on May 31, 2001. On June 28, 2001, the regional newspaper "Prizyv" published an article "Holy Outcasts", in which Valentine was accused of child molestation. In total, this newspaper published at least a dozen articles accusing the First Hierarch of the ROAC. The ROAC officials called these articles adversarial. The defrocked clerics organized street riots several times against Metropolitan Valentin and the clergy of the ROAC. Valentin (Rusantsov) and the leadership of the ROAC categorically rejected all the accusations, which were declared the machinations of supporters of the Moscow Patriarchate. In August–September 2001, interrogations and other active investigative actions were carried out. During the investigation, representatives of the prosecutor's office stated that the building of the Sacristy Monastery, which housed the Suzdal diocesan administration, was transferred illegally and should be returned to municipal ownership. Despite the fact that in September 2001, Valentin (Rusantsov) was signed not to leave, on October 13–30 he visited the United States, where he visited several parishes that had transferred to the ROAC from the ROCOR. On May 2, 2002, Priest Andrey Osetrov, the chief accuser of Valentin (Rusantsov), transferred to the Moscow Patriarchate. On August 23, 2002, Valentin (Rusantsov) was found guilty of committing a crime "against the sexual integrity of the individual" and sentenced to 4 years and 3 months of probation. On May 2, 2002, Alexander Soldatov created and headed the website portal-credo.ru, which provided significant information support to the ROAC.

Since that time, internal disturbances have begun in the ROAC, which led to the departure of people from it. The publicists Vladimir Moss, who joined the Chrysostomite synod (the parish in Guildford also left the ROAC with him), Kirill Frolov and Egor Kholmogorov, who joined the Moscow Patriarchate, and Alexey Muravyov, who joined the Russian Orthodox Old-Rite Church, are leaving the ROAC. On February 4, 2004, the community in Serpukhov of the ROAC, headed by Priest Roman Pavlov, and part of the parishioners of the Church of the New Martyrs and Confessors of Russia at the Golovinsky Cemetery in Moscow, headed by Archpriest Mikhail Makeyev, as well as the Orthodox Brotherhood of the Holy Apostle James, left the ROAC and came under the omophorion of Metropolitan Epiphanius (Panayotou) from the Old-Calindarist True Orthodox Church of Cyprus. In July 2004, Archbishop Gregory (Abu-Asaly) of Denver, who claimed to be the head of all foreign parishes in the ROAC, was expelled from the clergy of the ROAC. Finding himself alone, Archbishop Gregory of Denver and Colorado proclaimed the formation of a new schismatic group, called the "Russian Orthodox Autonomous Church in America." Thus, most of the parishes in the far abroad (USA, Bulgaria, England) were lost. One of the problematic topics for the ROAC in the 2000s was imiaslavie, the main supporter of which in the ROAC was hieromonk Gregory (Lourié). Also supporters of the imiaslavie views were Hegumen Theofan (Areskin), Alexander Soldatov, Tatiana Senina (nun Marfa), Olga Mitrenina. At the same time, many laymen and clerics of the ROAC condemned the imiaslavie as heresy; they were supported by Valentin (Rusantsov). On July 20, 2005, hegumen Gregory (Lourié) was banned from serving, and on September 5 of the same year he was defrocked, but he did not recognize the legality of this, and continued to perform divine services.

In the same year, a conflict between Metropolitan Valentin (Rusantsov) and the vicar of the Suzdal diocese, Bishop Sebastian (Zhatkov) was became, which led to the fact that the latter in 2006 spontaneously endowed himself with the title of archbishop and the right to wear a diamond cross on his klobuk. During a conversation with the First Hierarch of the ROAC, Bishop Sebastian categorically refused to remove the cross from the klobuk and return to his former title. In addition to these actions, Sebastian refused to comply with some personnel orders made by Metropolitan of Suzdal, Metropolitan of Suzdal, Valentin (Rusantsov), which contributed to the aggravation of the conflict. In November 2006, Bishop Sebastian received Abbot Gregory (Lourié) into communion. In the same 2006, Bishop Sebastian formally separated from the ROAC, declaring the formation of the "Provisional Church Council of the Russian Orthodox Autonomous Church." He motivated his decision by the lack of the spirit of conciliarity in the ROAC and the usurpation of the highest church authority by Metropolitan Valentin (Rusantsov). Reacting to the behavior of Bishop Sebastian of Chelyabinsk, the Synod of Bishops of the ROAC in February 2007 banned him from the priesthood and excommunicated him from communion for a period of one year. In May 2007, an alternative center was formed in Bezhetsk, named the "Provisional Church Council" under Bishop Sebastian (Zhatkov) of Chelyabinsk, which united several parishes that had left the subordination of the Synod of the ROAC. The Provisional Church Council of the Russian Orthodox Autonomous Church was headed by hegumen Gregory (Lourié), rector of the Church of the Holy Martyr Elizabeth in St. Petersburg. Boris Redkin was elected his Deputy, a journalist Alexander Soldatov as Chancellor, and Olga Mitrenina (nun Xenia) as Secretary. The Synod of the ROAC did not recognize this body. On February 8–11, 2008, the first Bishops' Council in the history of this church jurisdiction was held in Suzdal, which, however, failed to reconcile the warring parties. On November 5, 2008, a final split occurred in the ROAC, as a result of which Sebastian (Zhatkov) and the retired former Bishop of Khabarovsk Ambrose (Yepifanov) announced the creation of a new body within the ROAC named the "Bishops' Conference of the Russian Orthodox Autonomous Church". The next day, Sebastian and Ambrose ordained Gregory (Lourié) as bishop of Petrograd and Gdov, after which Lourié joined the Bishops' Conference and was elected its Chairman.

=== Seizure of churches and relics ===
In the autumn of 2006, the process began in the Arbitration Court of the Vladimir Oblast: the territorial administration of the Federal Agency for State Property Management demanded that 13 Suzdal churches be withdrawn from use from the ROAC. On February 5, 2009, the Arbitration Court of the Vladimir Oblast, at the request of the Federal Agency for State Property Management, decided to withdraw 13 churches from the ROAC due to the absence of a contract for their use. In the acts of inspection of churches presented to the court by the State Property, "violations in the operation of religious buildings were noted." The ROAC disagreed with the reasoning of the department, pointing out that its head, Metropolitan Valentin, received the title of honorary citizen of Suzdal precisely for his great contribution to the restoration of religious buildings. In addition, the Church referred to contracts with the State Center for the Accounting, use and restoration of historical and cultural monuments of the Vladimir Oblast, which give them the right to dispose of all 13 religious buildings. Representatives of the ROAC stated that they do not intend to give up the churches in any event. On August 12, 2009, the Suzdal Diocesan Administration of the ROAC was visited by bailiffs of the Department of the Federal Bailiff Service in the Vladimir region and informed about the initiation of enforcement proceedings against the Suzdal Diocese of the ROAC in favor of the Vladimir Department of the Federal Property Management Agency and presented the writ of execution issued by the Vladimir Arbitration Court. On September 11, the Department of the Federal Bailiff Service in the Vladimir region completed enforcement proceedings on the decisions of the Arbitration Court of the Vladimir region on the liberation of 10 churches of the city of Suzdal from the communities of the ROAC occupying them: officially, the churches were completely freed from their former owners; after the service in the Tsar-Constantine church, cleared of movable property, the official representative of the Vladimir Territorial Administration of the Federal Property Management Agency announced the agency's entry into the management of the building. By October, 14 churches in Suzdal had been seized from the ROAC in favor of the state, and proceedings were underway for six more located in the vicinity of the city. The buildings erected in the XV—XIX centuries were returned, according to the plaintiff's representatives, in poor condition. A representative of the Federal Agency for State Property Management said that the buildings began to collapse despite the fact that large sums were transferred for restoration from abroad. The ROAC explained the poor condition of the temples by the fact that in the early 1990s the ROAC (then the Suzdal diocese of ROCOR) received them in a state of ruins. According to the representative of the Suzdal diocese of the ROAC, "violation of wall structures" during the analysis of heating are equal to the same "violations" when installing this heating; the notches on the paintings of the church of John the Baptist were applied in the Soviet period. The new murals of the Assumption Church were made in accordance with the miraculously preserved small remnants of the painting of the beginning of the XX century. All restoration work was carried out by the ROAC under the supervision of the State Center for the Protection, Accounting and Restoration of Historical and Cultural Monuments of the Vladimir region, whose specialists at the last inspection of the temples in 2006 found their condition good, with the exception of minor shortcomings in the arrangement of the blind area, etc. At the end of November 2009, the Federal Agency for State Property Management sent a letter to the Department of Internal Affairs of Suzdal with a request to initiate criminal proceedings the case against the ROAC and its primate. The document refers to the "violation of wall structures" in connection with the dismantling of the heating system in some churches, the "destruction of ancient frescoes" and the application of new ones that do not correspond to the historical painting and the application of notches on the frescoes of the church of John the Baptist. On December 4, 2009, the ROAC filed a lawsuit with the European Court of Human Rights. In December 2009, three churches in Suzdal, seized from the ROAC, Kresto-Nikolskaya, Lazarevskaya and Antipyevskaya, were transferred to the Russian Orthodox Church. On January 7, 2010, a new temporary church of Tsar Constantine was consecrated in Suzdal instead of the seized churches, under which the attic of a two-story diocesan house on Vasilevskaya Street in the center of Suzdal was converted.

On February 16, 2010, the Vladimir Arbitration Court granted three claims of the Department of Property and Land Relations of the Administration of the Vladimir Oblaast to the communities of the ROAC; according to the court decision, the ROAC should release and transfer to the Department of Property and Land Relations the Church of St. Ephraim the Syrian in the village of Omutskoye, George the Victorious in the village of Krapivye and Archangel Michael in the village of Ivanovskoye, Suzdal district of the Vladimir region. On February 24, 2010, the same court issued a decision on the seizure from the ROAC of the church of the Blessed Prince Alexander Nevsky in the village of Ves, on June 9 — the church of St. Basil the Great in the village of Borisovskoye and John the Baptist in the village of Pavlovskoye, Suzdal district. In October 2010, three (Andrey Chesnokov, Andrey Smirnov, Arkady Makovetsky) of the 11 priests that the ROAC had in Suzdal and the district transferred to the Moscow Patriarchate.

On February 4, 2011, the Bishops' Council of the ROAC was held in Suzdal, at which it was decided to ordain two bishops. Cleric of the Iveron Synodal Church of the ROAC Archimandrite Trophim (Tarasov) He was elected Bishop of Simbirsk, vicar of the Suzdal diocese, and Archimandrite Mark (Rassokha), rector of St. John the Baptist Church of Armavir, was elected bishop of Armavir and the Black Sea. On February 5, 2011, the episcopal consecration of Archimandrite Trophim (Tarasov) took place. On February 10, 2011, the episcopal consecration of Archimandrite Mark (Rassokha) took place, who, contrary to definition, became only a vicar of the North Caucasus diocese with the title of "Bishop of Armavir". In June 2011, the only parish of the ROAC in Argentina, headed by Priest Siluán Dignac, transferred to the Russian True Orthodox Church.

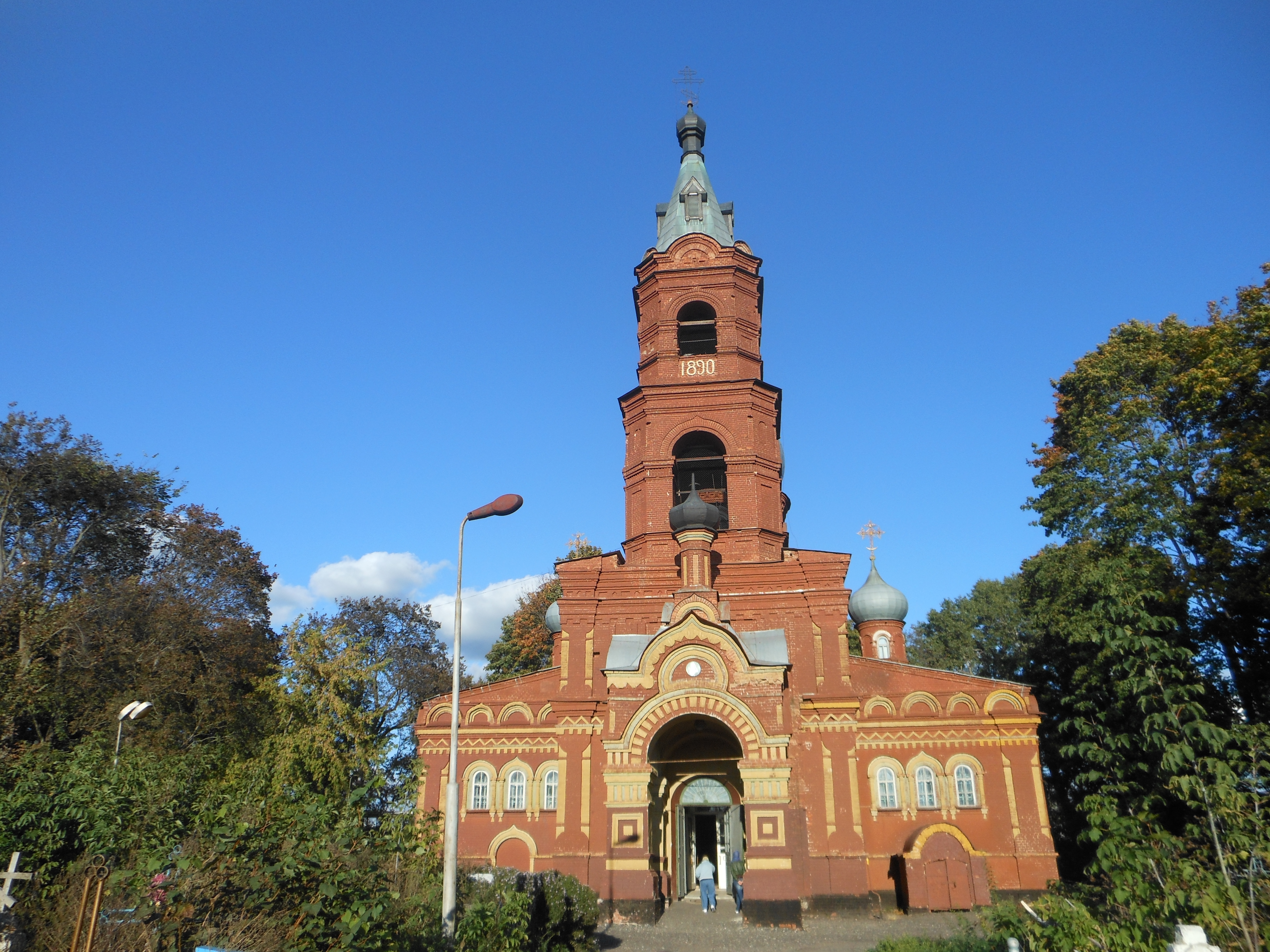
the Church of St. Elijah in Trubchevsk

On January 16, 2012, the first hierarch of the ROAC, Valentin (Rusantsov), died. The seizure of churches in Suzdal and the Suzdal district, the departure of priests and laypeople and the death of Valentin (Rusantsov) weakened the position of the ROAC. Bishop Gregory (Lourié) noted at the beginning of 2012 that only 3 churches remained in Suzdal: "a small church in the "sleeping area" of the town and two house churches in the center are all that were not state property <...> A few years ago their capacity would not have been enough for Sunday services, but now there is enough <...> In the villages of the Suzdal district, the picture was similar, with one exception, the village of Ves. <...> In other villages, parishes either collapsed (mostly elderly parishioners stopped going to church at all, and some began to go to Suzdal), or, as in the largest village parish of the village of Borisovskoye, <...> they moved to the ROC MP after their rector.".

On October 26, 2016, a trial began in Yaroslavl on the seizure from the ROAC community of the church of the Vladimir Icon of the Mother of God on Bozhedomka, transferred to the use of the ROAC in 1999. On November 21 of the same year, a decision was made to withdraw the church. In May 2017, bailiffs ordered the rector to vacate the premises.

On December 19, 2018, in Tula, the Appellate instance of the Arbitration Court on the claim of the Klintsy Diocese of the Russian Orthodox Church decided to withdraw from the ROAC community the Church of Elijah the Prophet, located in Trubchevsk, Bryansk Oblast. The modern building of the Church was built in 1845, and in 1890-1893 it was completely rebuilt. This is the last of the churches belonging to the ROAC, built before the revolution of 1917.

=== 2020s ===
On March 12, 2021, Bishop James (Antonov) of Sukhodol died. On July 8, 2021, Archbishop Hilarion (Goncharenko) of Smelyansk died. In March 2022, website Credo.Press (until 2018 — Portal-Credo.ru), which provided constant information support to the ROAC, stopped working. On May 6, 2022, Archimandrite Bessarion (Varyukhin) was consecrated bishop of Tulgan. On May 8, 2022, the consecration of Archimandrite Cassian (Angelov) to the Bishop of Velbazhd took place. On October 4, 2022, Archbishop Seraphim (Zinchenko) of Sukhumi and Abkhazia died.

== Literature ==
- 10-летие открытых приходов РПЦЗ в России [10th anniversary of the opening of ROCOR parishes in Russia]. Вертоградъ (in Russian) (7—8 (64—65)). Братством св. Апостола Иакова: 21–43. 2000.
- Лункин, Роман (2004). "Российская православная автономная церковь (РПАЦ)". In Отв. ред. М. Бурдо, С. Б. Филатов (ed.). Современная религиозная жизнь России. Опыт систематического описания (in Russian). Vol. I. М.: Университетская книга, Логос. pp. 79–92. ISBN 5-94010-237-9.
- Маковецкий, Аркадий, свящ. (2016). "Миссионерская деятельность Владимирской епархии Московского Патриархата по преодолению «Суздальского Раскола». Публикация документов: Переписка Архиепископа Евлогия (Смирнова) и монаха Валентина (Русанцова) (1991—2008 гг.)". Архивариус. Киев: Serenity-Group (in Russian) (4 (8)): 15–27.
- Маковецкий, Аркадий, свящ. (2017). "Деятельность Владимирской епархии Московского Патриархата по преодолению "Суздальского раскола"". Церковь, государство и общество в истории России и православных стран: религия, наука и образование. Материалы IX Международной научной конференции, посвященной памяти православных просветителей святых равноапостольных Кирилла и Мефодия 17-24 мая 2017 г. (in Russian). Владимир: 211–213.
- Маковецкий, Аркадий, свящ. (2020-09-27). Русская Православная Церковь заграницей: этап возникновения и организационного оформления ее приходов на канонической территории Русской Православной Церкви и их объединение с Матерью-Церковью (1990—2007 гг.) (PDF) (Doctorate thesis). Moscow: Общецерковный докторский диссертационный совет.
- Слесарев, Александр (2009). Старостильный раскол в истории Православной Церкви (1924—2008) (PDF). М.: Изд-во Крутицкого подворья. Общество любителей церковной истории.
- Соколова, А. Д. (2005). "Российская православная автономная церковь по данным сети Internet". Вестник Московского университета. Серия 7. Философия (in Russian) (5): 115–118.
