= Religion in Latvia =

Religion in Latvia (2019 estimate)
1. Lutheranism 36.51 (36.0%)
2. Catholicism 19 (18.7%)
3. Eastern Orthodoxy 13.49 (13.3%)
4. Other Christians 1.42 (1.40%)
5. No religion 31.09 (30.6%)
6. Other religions 0.03 (0.03%)

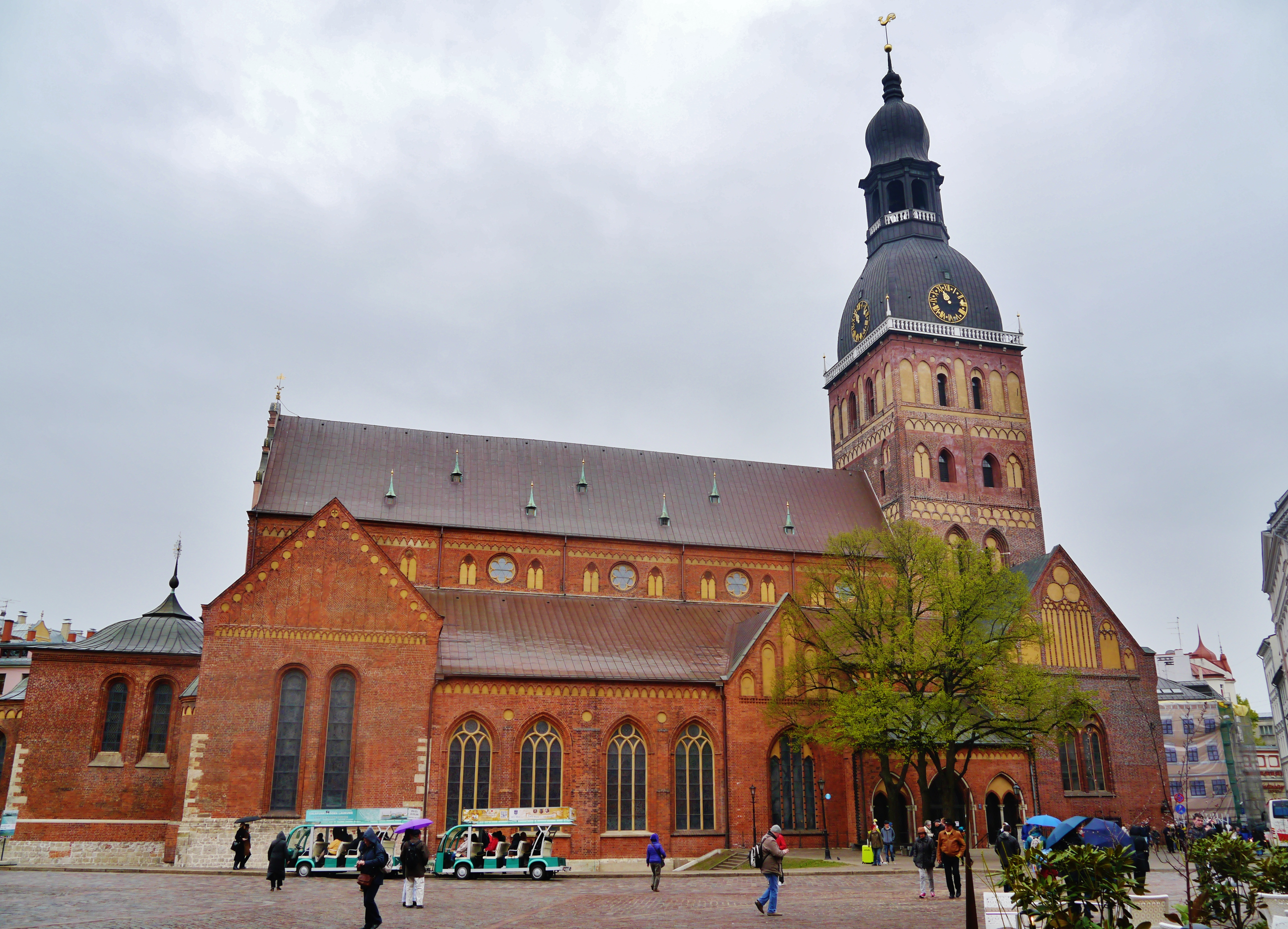
Riga Cathedral (Rīgas Doms) in the capital Riga was originally built in 1211.

The main religion traditionally practiced in Latvia is Christianity. As of 2019, it is the largest religion (68.84%), though only about 7% of the population attends religious services regularly.

Lutheranism is the main Christian denomination among ethnic Latvians due to strong historical links with the Nordic countries and Northern Germany (see Hanseatic League), while Catholicism is most prevalent in eastern Latvia (Latgale), mostly due to Polish influence. The Latvian Orthodox Church is the third largest Christian church in Latvia, with adherents primarily among the Russian-speaking minority.

== History ==
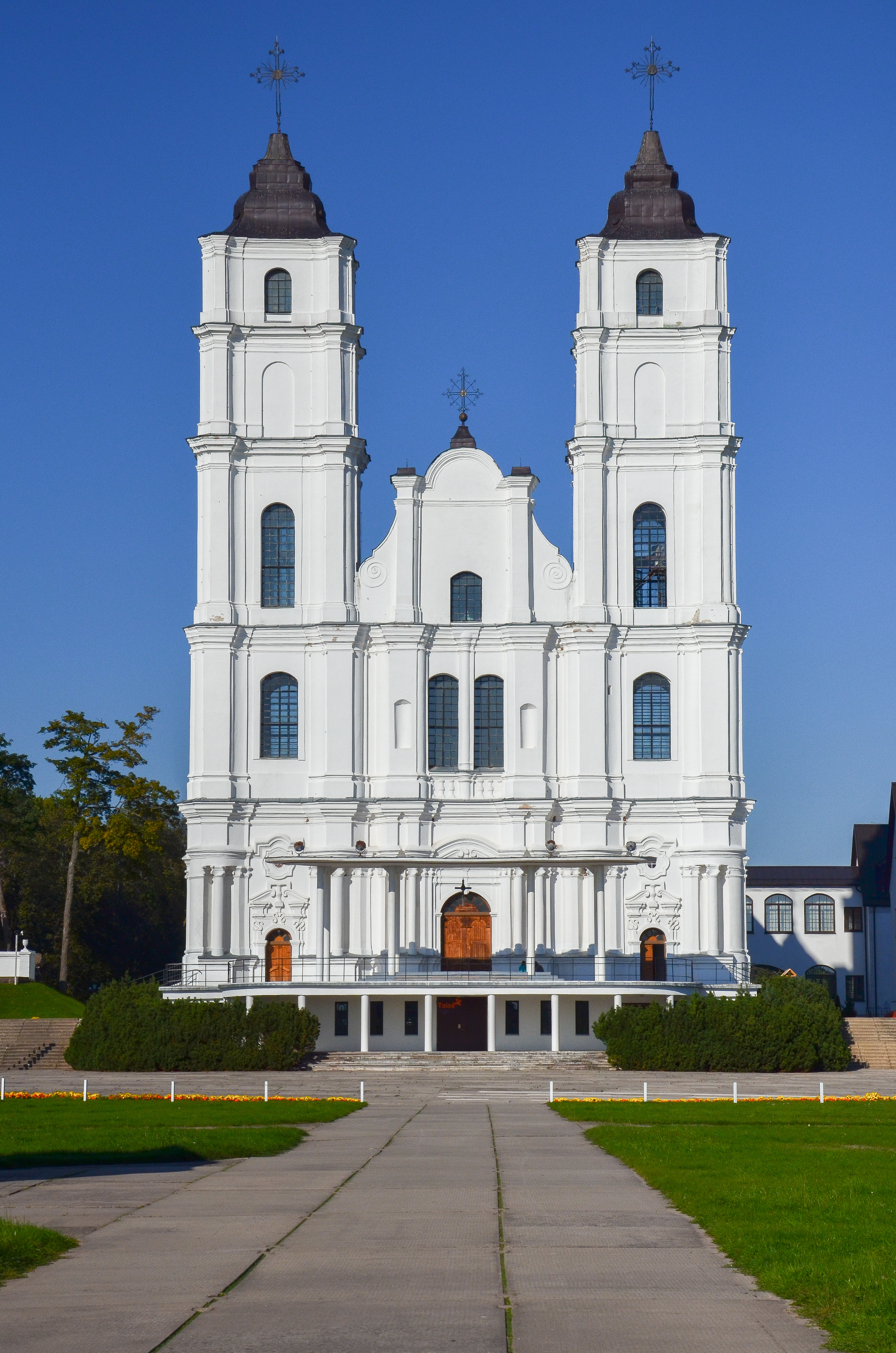
Basilica of the Assumption of Aglona

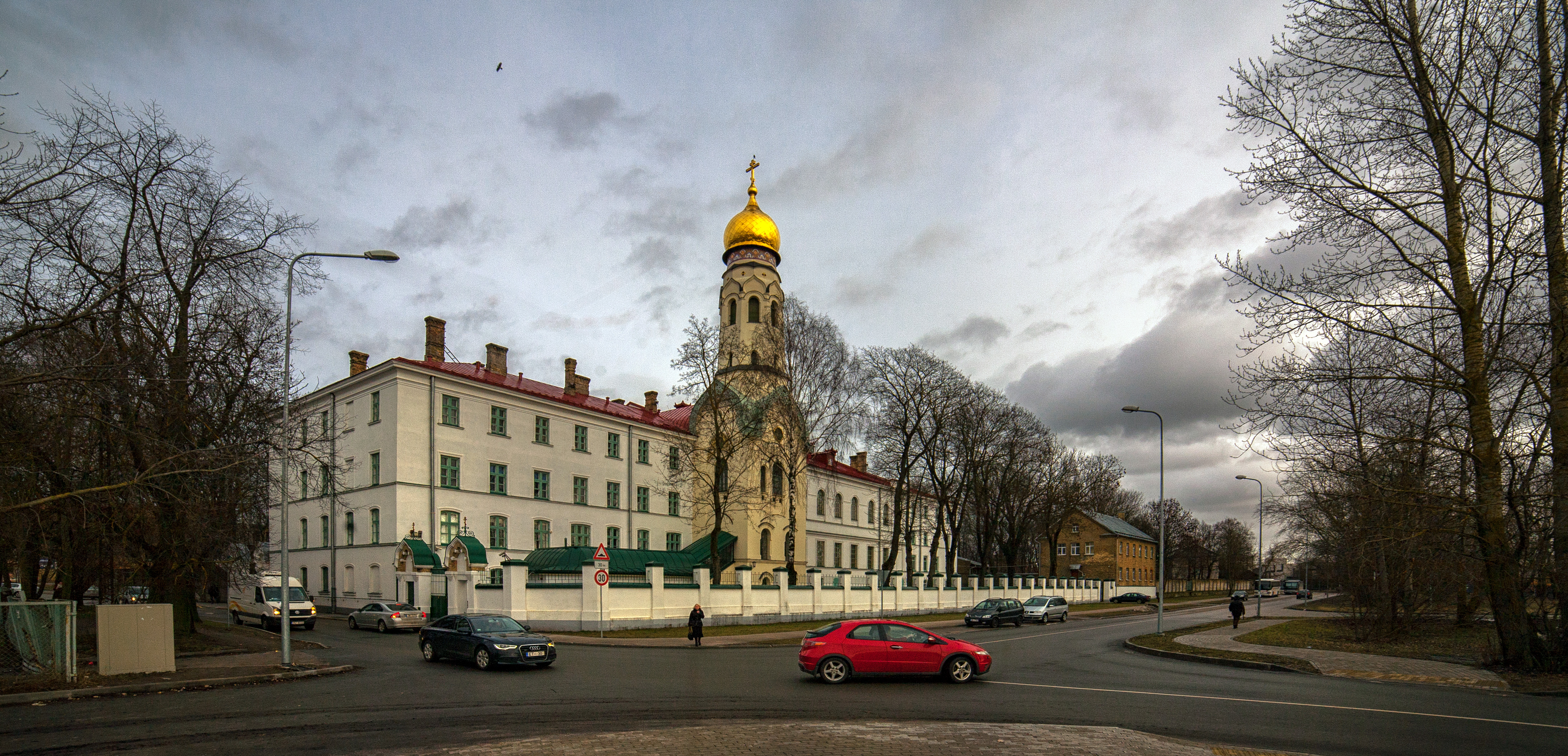
Grebenstchikov House of Prayer

Latvia was one of the last regions in Europe to be Christianized. The inhabitants of the region that is now Latvia once practiced Baltic paganism, but this practice gradually diminished through the course of the centuries. In the 12th to 13th centuries Latvia first became part of the Catholic Church, as the Christian kings of Denmark, Sweden and the North German Livonian and Teutonic military orders fought for influence in the region in what later became known as the Northern Crusades. Despite the Christianization, the local populace in the countryside maintained their pagan belief system for several centuries, with pockets of paganism surviving in Latvia up until the 17th century. Along with the rest of the traditional holidays, Christmas (Ziemassvētki) and Easter (Lieldienas) in Latvia still largely retain their pagan roots.

During the Protestant Reformation the teachings of Lutheranism from Northern Germany and Scandinavia completely changed the religious landscape in the country. Andreas Knopcken (1468–1539) come to Latvia in 1521 to spread Lutheran ideas. Latvian leaders signed the Peace of Augsburg in 1555. Eventually only eastern Latvia (Latgale) remained Catholic, due to the influence of the Polish–Lithuanian Commonwealth. Until the 20th century, the Latvian Lutheran Church was part of the church organizations of Sweden or Russia.

The Old Believers—primarily of the bespopovtsy (priestless) tradition—fled religious persecution in the Tsardom of Russia to settle in Latvian lands. In Riga, they erected the large Grebenstchikov House of Prayer in 1760 and rebuilt in 1886. During Latvia's independent interwar period (1918–1940), the community flourished politically, culturally, and educationally with state support.

The history of minor Protestant denominations in Latvia dates back to the 16th century with the arrival of Reformed communities; a Reformed church was built in Riga in 1733. In 1729, the Herrnhuters (Moravian Brethren) began their ministry in Vidzeme; this work continued for a century and significantly influenced the spiritual life of the Latvian people. An Anglican community was officially established in Riga in 1830, and the community built the St. Saviour's Church between 1853 and 1859. The history of Latvian Baptists traces back to 1860, when the first Baptist congregation appeared in Riga; the Union of Latvian Baptists was formed in 1879. As early as the 19th century, the restorationist Catholic Apostolic Church (Irvingites, later known as Old Apostolics) had a congregation in Riga. Seventh-day Adventists began preaching in Latvia in the mid-1890s. Methodists began their activities in Latvia in 1921. The Holiness movement was represented by the Church of God (Anderson, Indiana) and the Salvation Army: the Church of God established a missionary society in Riga in 1902 that specialized in preaching among Baltic and Russian Germans, and in 1923, two officers from the Swedish branch of the Salvation Army commenced their ministry there. In 1926, Jānis Grēviņš returned to Latvia from the United States, having embraced Pentecostalism while in America; the following year, he organized the Latvian-American Missionary Society.

William Fetler (Wilhelms Andreis Vettlers, 1883–1957) was a prominent Latvian-American Baptist evangelist, revivalist, and missionary pioneer who spread the evangelical faith across Latvia, Russian Empire and Poland.

Before World War II, 2/3 of Latvia was Protestant; overwhelmingly Lutheran with scarce Calvinist population and individual cases of adhering to other Protestant confessions.

One of the first new religious movements in Latvia was esoteric Roerichism. And the Latvian Roerich Society (Latvijas Reriha Biedriba) in Riga became one of the global centers of the Roerich movement; it began its activities in the mid-1920s and was officially registered on October 13, 1930. The society was particularly active in publishing books in Russian and Latvian, and it was here that certain works by the Roerichs were published for the first time. The poet and expert of the East Richard Rudzitis served as one of the society's leaders. The society ceased operations following Latvia's incorporation into the USSR and resumed activity and reregistration only in 1988.

The independent Evangelical Lutheran Church of Latvia was established in 1922 following the formation of the Latvian state. A Swedish archbishop ordained Kārlis Irbe—who had been elected by the synod—as the Church's Archbishop, while a separate bishop was ordained for the German minority. However, following the establishment of Soviet rule, the archbishop and up to 80% of the pastors were forced to emigrate or deported. It was not until 1954 that the activities of the Latvian Church within the USSR were re-legalized, albeit subject to certain restrictions. After Latvia regained its independence in 1990, the Church underwent a leadership change: figures accused of collaborating with the Soviet authorities were removed from church administration, and a new archbishop was elected.

== Demographics ==
According to the Annual Report of Religious Organizations and their Activities published by the Ministry of Justice (MOJ), based on 2022 data, the largest religious groups are Lutheran (37 percent), Roman Catholic (19 percent), and Latvian Orthodox Christian (13 percent); almost 30 percent of the country is unaffiliated to any religious group.

In a survey from 2015, the ISSP found that 62.6% of the Latvian population declared to belong to a Christian denomination, divided in 19.7% Russian Orthodox, 18.5% Roman Catholic, 17.8% Protestant, 6.1% Old Believers and 0.5% belonged to smaller Christian denominations. A further 36.7% declared to have no religion and 0.7% declared to belong to other religions.

In the same year the Eurobarometer survey by the European Commission found different results, with 76.7% of the Latvians regarding themselves as Christians, divided in 26.2% Catholics 24.0% Eastern Orthodox, 16.6% Protestants, and 9.9% other Christians. The unaffiliated people made up the 22.0% of the respondents and were divided in Atheists with 4.7% and Agnostics with 17.3%.

The Latvian polling agency SKDS has also gathered information regarding the religious affiliation of Latvia over the years. In 2018, 26% of the population was Orthodox, 20% identified as Catholic while 17% was Lutheran, and 3% were Old Believers. 14% believed in God without being affiliated to any religion, while 15% declared themselves as atheist. A further 3% belonged to other Christian sects or religions.

Religious affiliation (%)	1860	1897	1935	2000	2001	2003	2005	2006	2007	2008	2009	2010	2011	2014	2016	2018
Orthodox	8.9	8.6	8.9	22	18.9	25	24	26	24	24	23	23	25	25.6	25	26
Catholic	18.4	20.2	24.5	19	22.3	21	21	20	22	22	24	23	21	22.6	22	20
Lutheran	66.4	59.1	55.2	28	23.8	25	20	21	21	24	22	20	23	18.4	20	17
Old Believer	3.2	4.1	5.5		2.7	3	4	2	2	4	3	3	4	4	2	3
Judaism	3.2	7.4	4.8													
Other faiths / denominations	0	0.6	1.2	2	2	2	1	1	3	3	1	4	3	2	2	3
Belief in God without religion	-	-	-	10	12.8	9	11	10	10	10	10	11	9	9.7	10	14
Atheist	-	-	-	18	17.7	12	16	14	14	11	15	16	14	16.4	17	15
Undecided	-	-	-	3	2	3	3	6	4	2	2	0	1	2	2	3

View source data.

Religion in Latvia, SKDS surveys 2000-2018

Lutherans
Catholics
Eastern Orthodox
Unaffiliated believers
Irreligious

=== Church membership ===
In 2011, churches in Latvia provided the following estimates of church membership to the Justice Ministry:

Adherents	Number
Lutherans	708,773
Catholics	430,000
Orthodox	370,000
Old Believer Orthodox	34,517
Baptists	6,930
Seventh-day Adventists	4,046
Pentecostals	3,268
Evangelicals	3,171
New Generation	3,020
New Apostolics	1,268
Latter-day Saints	852
Methodists	751
Dievturi	663
Augsburg Lutheran	581
Salvation Army	462
Jews	416
Muslims	319
German Lutheran	308
Jehovah's Witnesses	290
Old Apostolics	287
Buddhists	155
Reformed	145

Other sources may contain significantly different data regarding numbers. For instance, by 2005, there were already 10,000 Pentecostals in the country.

== Religion in Latvia today ==
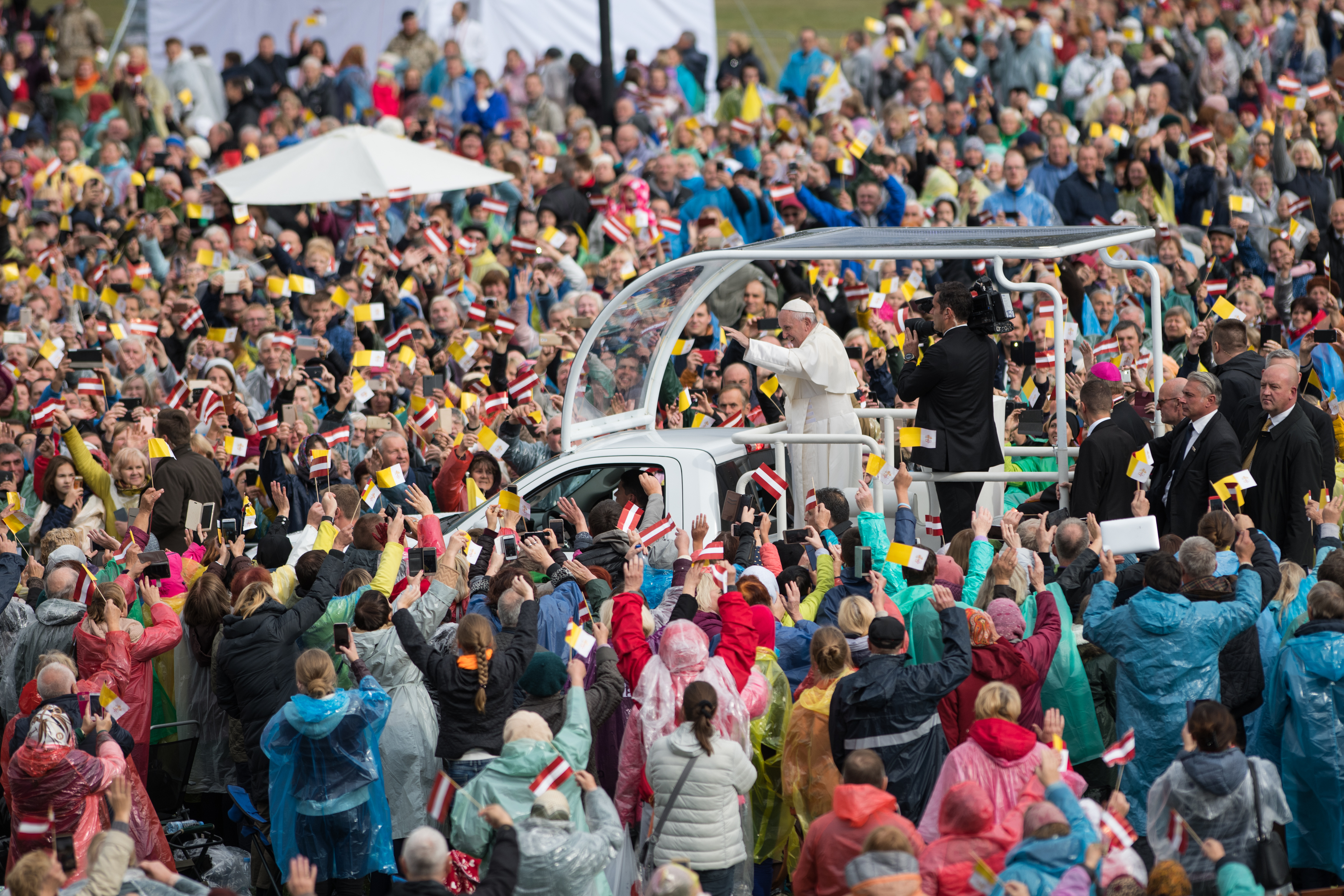
Pope Francis in Latvia, September 2018

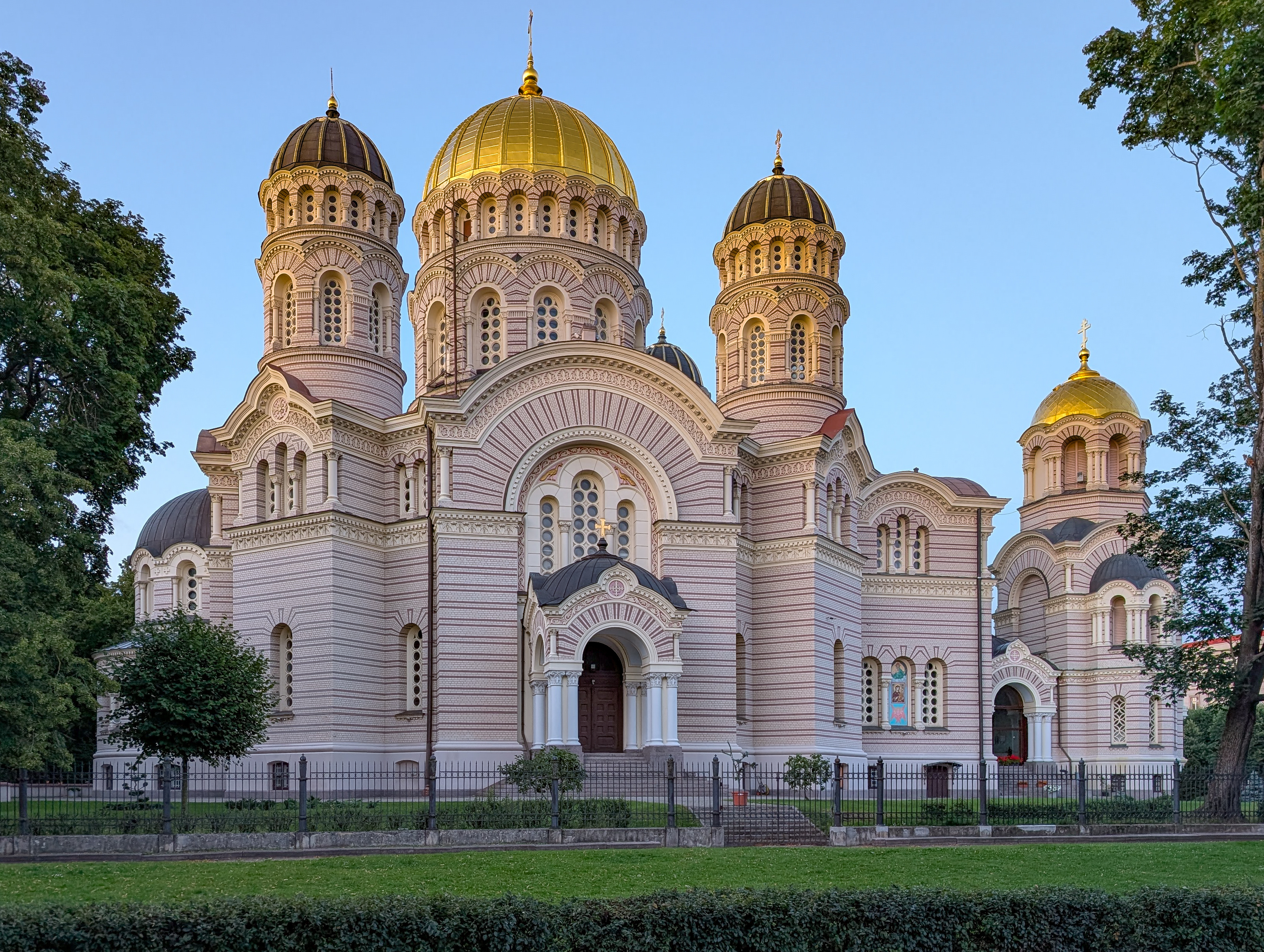
Nativity of Christ Cathedral, the largest Orthodox church in the Baltic region

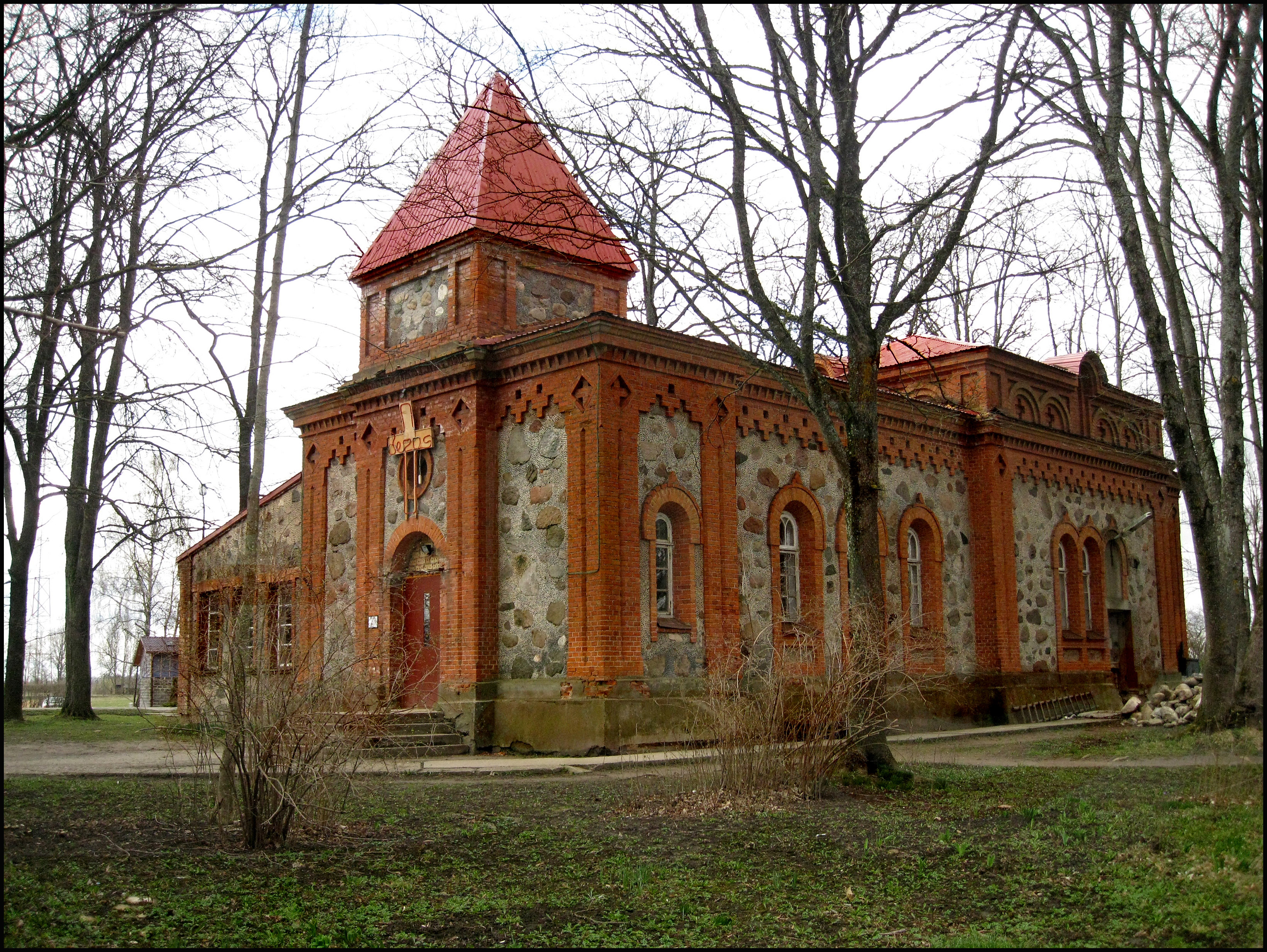
Valdemārpils Pentecostal Church

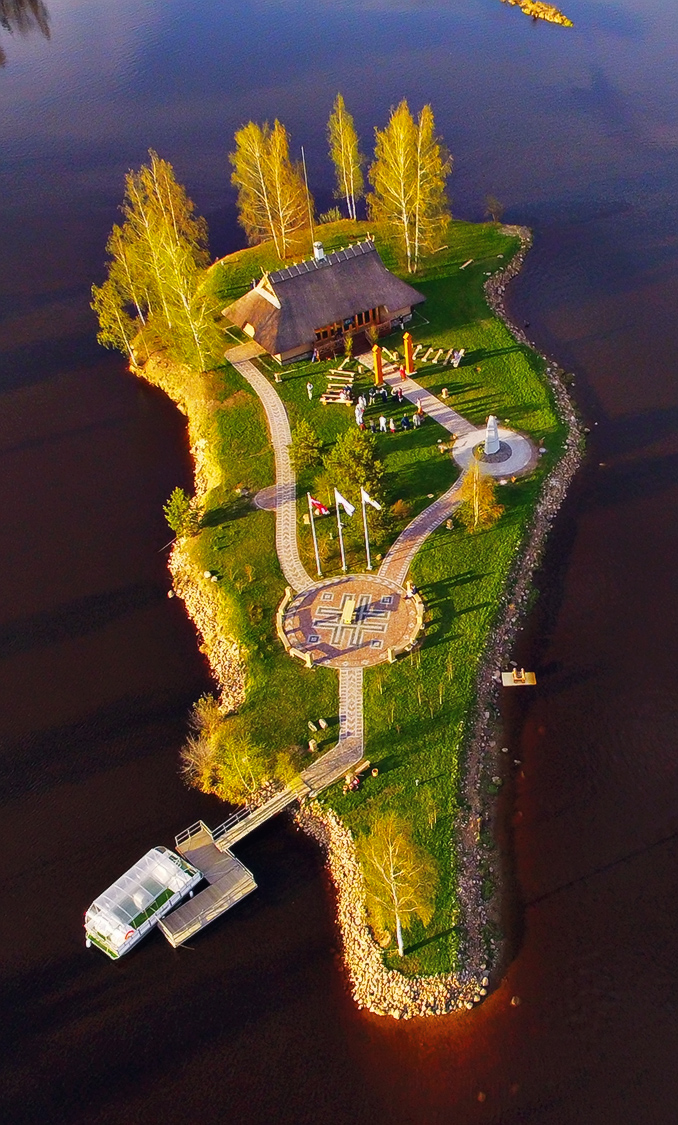
Aerial view of the Lokstene Shrine of Dievturi

The Evangelical Lutheran Church of Latvia has 708,773 members. The Catholic Church in Latvia has 430,000 members. Historically, the west and central parts of the country have been predominantly Protestant, while the east — particularly the Latgale region – has been predominantly Catholic, although Catholics are now common in Riga and other cities due to migration from Latgale. Historically, Lutherans were the majority, but Communist rule weakened Lutheranism much more than Catholicism, with the result that there are now only slightly more Lutherans than Catholics. Latvian Lutherans reinstate male-only clergy. Also active in the country are such independent minor Lutheran denominations as the Latvian Evangelical Lutheran Church Worldwide, the Confessional Lutheran Church of the Augsburg Confession and a community of German Lutherans.

The Latvian Orthodox Church is then-semi-autonomous. In 2022 Latvia passed a law removing all influence or power over the Orthodox Church from non Latvians, which would include the Patriarch of Moscow, making the Orthodox Church of Latvia completely independent. There is also the minor Latvian Orthodox Autonomous Church. Orthodoxy predominates among the Latvian Russian population. The Central Council of the Pomorian Old-Orthodox Church of Latvia is a religious body of the descendants of Russian Old Believers.

Other Christian denominations in Latvia include the Armenian Apostolic Church, Adventists, Calvinists, Episcopal Baptists, Evangelicals, Methodists, the Salvation Army, New Apostolics, Pentecostals, the neo-charismatic New Generation movement, Jehovah's Witnesses, and Latter-day Saints. The Reformed Church in Latvia is a small Reformed denomination with two congregations in Riga. After an Orthodox priest converted to the Ukrainian Greek Catholic Church, brothers from Lithuania helped organize a Greek-Catholic parish in Latvia. In 2003, the Justice Ministry also registered the Christian Scientists as a religious congregation. Such Evangelical movement combinated Christian faith with Jewish traditions as Messianics has a small community there.

Ecumenical cooperation between main churches, namely Lutheran, Catholic, Orthodox, Armenian, Adventist, Baptist, Methodist, Pentecostal, and sometimes even Old Believers, include a celebration of the Week of Prayer for Christian Unity, joint theological conferences, cooperation in theological education or preparation of the ecumenical religious education curriculum for public schools. The Latvian Evangelical Alliance (LEA) is an interdenominational Christian union of member-bodies and individuals in Latvia founded In 2002, at Riga Cathedral, affiliated to the European and World Evangelical Alliances.

As of 2022, the population of Jews in Latvia was 4,000, although some estimates are double this. The Riga's Peitav-Shul Synagogue and the other one is located in Daugavpils are the only two active synagogues in Latvia. Most active Jewish religious movement in the country is the Chabad.

There are 1,000 Muslims in Latvia.

There are also new religious movements, such as the neopagan Latvian ethnic religion Dievturība, esoteric Roerichism, and others.

As of 2011, the Justice Ministry had registered 1145 congregations. This total included: Lutheran (294), Catholic (250), Orthodox (122), Baptist (94), Old Believer Orthodox (69), Pentecostal (52), Seventh-day Adventist (51), Evangelical (39), New Generation (18), Muslim (17), Jehovah's Witnesses (15), Jewish (13), Methodist (12), New Apostolic (11), Hare Krishna (11), Dievturi (10), Buddhist (4), Church of Jesus Christ of Latter-day Saints (Mormons) (4), and 18 other congregations.

Because of the state policy of atheism during the Soviet era and the general European trend of secularization, religiosity declined drastically, and today a growing percentage of Latvians claims not to follow any religion, with low church attendance.

== Freedom of religion ==
In 2023, the country was scored 4 out of 4 for religious freedom by the Freedom House with a remark, that "Latvia’s small Muslim population has faced some social pressure since a 2015 refugee crisis."
