= ROFC =

The abbreviation ROFC may refer to one of the following English football clubs:

- Radcliffe Olympic F.C.
- Rushall Olympic F.C.
- Russian Orthodox Free Church (see Russian Orthodox Autonomous Church)
