= Latvian Orthodox Church =

Unrecognized Eastern Orthodox church

- Latvijas Pareizticīgā Baznīca
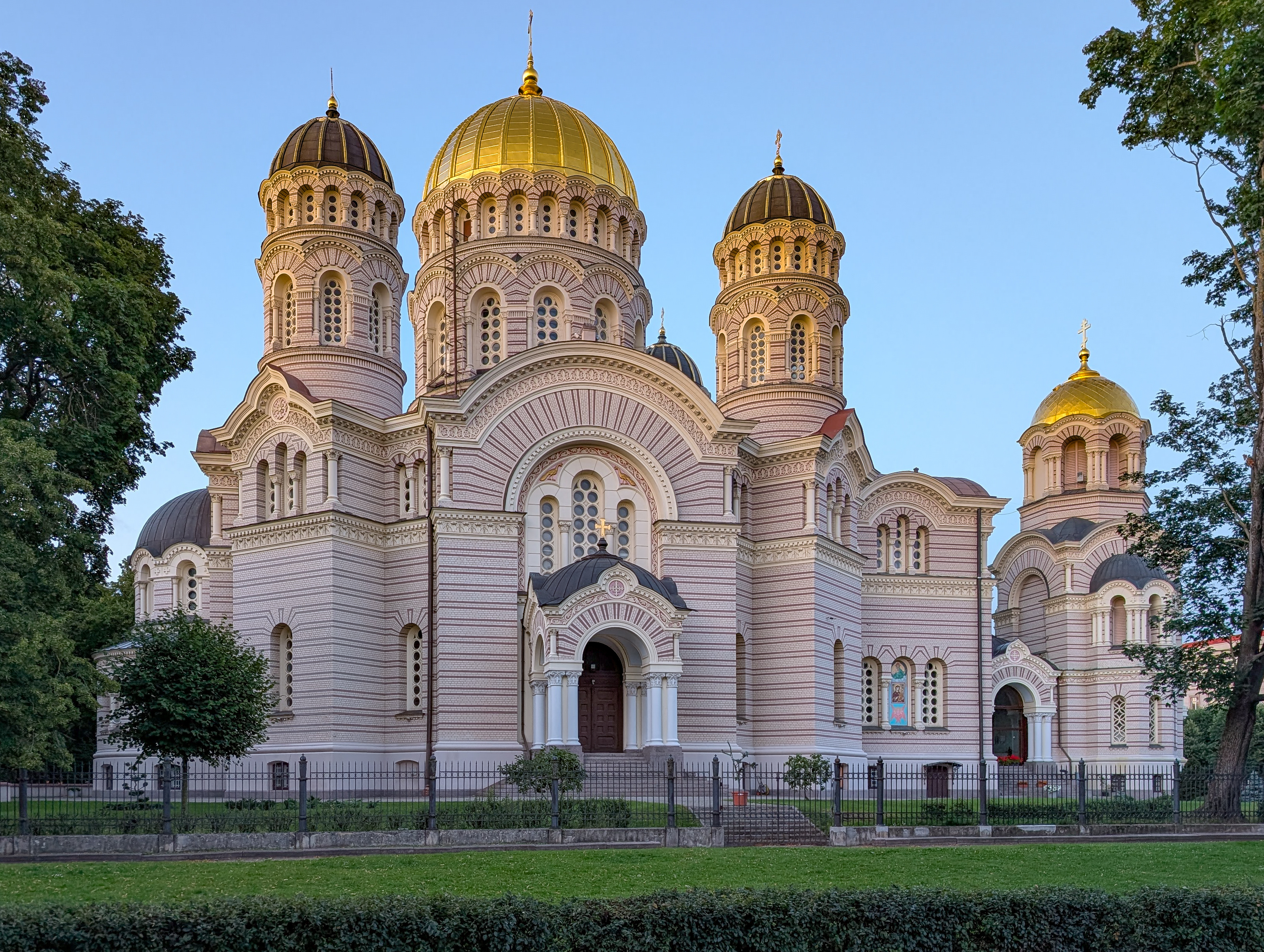
- Cathedral of the Nativity of Christ, Riga
- Abbreviation: LOC
- Type: Autocephaly (self-declared)
- Classification: Christian
- Orientation: Eastern Orthodox
- Theology: Eastern Orthodox theology
- Polity: Episcopal
- Structure: Communion
- Metropolitan: Aleksandrs (Kudrjašovs), Metropolitan of Riga and Latvia
- Autonomy: 1921
- Language: Latvian; Church Slavonic
- Liturgy: Byzantine Rite
- Headquarters: Riga, Latvia
- Territory: Latvia
- Possessions: Latvia
- Independence: 2022 (de facto)
- Separated from: Russian Orthodox Church
- Congregations: 126 (2019)
- Official website: http://www.pareizticiba.lv

The Latvian Orthodox Church (Latvian: Latvijas Pareizticīgā Baznīca) is an unrecognized Eastern Orthodox church based in Latvia. The primate of the church carries the title of Metropolitan of Riga and all Latvia (Latvian: Rīgas un visas Latvijas metropolīts). This position has been occupied since October 27, 1990, by Metropolitan Aleksandrs (Kudrjašovs).

Until 2022, the Latvian Orthodox Church was universally recognized as a self-governing part of the Russian Orthodox Church. On 8 September 2022, the Latvian parliament directed the Latvian Orthodox Church to declare a status of autocephaly, due to Patriarch Kirill's support of the Russian invasion of Ukraine. As of June 2026, no Orthodox churches have recognized the autocephaly of the Latvian Church.

== History ==
Orthodoxy developed in Latvia in the 11th century as a mission field of the diocese of Polotsk. The country remained mostly pagan until it was conquered in the 13th century by the Catholic Teutonic Order. Prior to this, however, part of prominent Latgalian noblemen (e. g., Visvaldis, Vetseke) and a large part of Latgalian people, in general, had converted to Orthodoxy voluntarily. There were Eastern Orthodox churches in Jersika from the evidence of the Livonian Chronicle; many church-related words came into pre-Latvian languages in that time. An Orthodox presence continued after the Teutonic Order conquest at least officially, in the form of churches for Russian merchants and others, but these were small communities among a majority of Catholics before 1525 and Lutherans afterwards.

After Latvia was annexed to the Russian Empire in the 18th century (most of Latvia, a result of the Great Northern War by the Treaty of Nystad, the Latgale region after the First Partition of Poland in 1772), Russian and Orthodox presence increased substantially, but the Eastern Orthodox Church remained foreign to some Latvians. The first orthodox church after the Northern War was Alexeyevsky monastery in Riga old town.

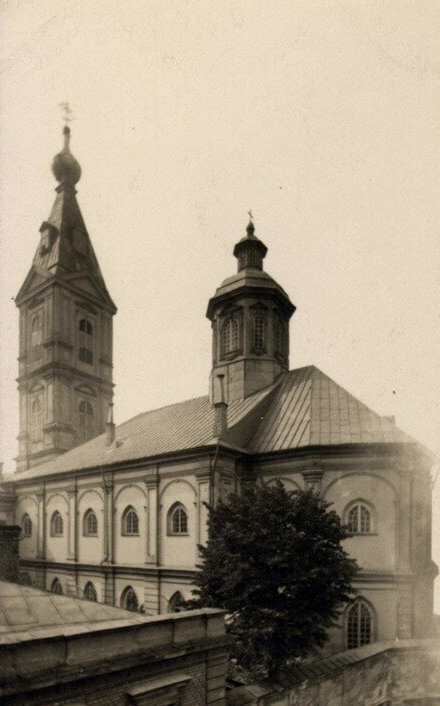
Riga Alexeyevsky Orthodox Monastery (nowadays Saint Mary Magdalene Catholic Church) in Riga

The Latvian Orthodox Church as a body including ethnic Latvians as well as Russians dates back to the 1840s, when native Latvians (who were at that time subjects of the Russian Empire) petitioned Nicholas I of Russia to be allowed to conduct services in their native tongue. The Orthodox Church enjoyed some success in its missions among the Latvians due to its use of the Latvian language and by personal appeal of local Orthodox bishops who sought to support native Latvian inhabitants whose rights were limited by Baltic Germans. In the 1880s the Orthodox Nativity Cathedral was built in Riga. However, it was always regarded suspiciously by the Lutheran Germanic nobles of the area; conversely the predominantly German character of the Lutheran Church in Latvia was a factor in the movement of some 40,000 Latvians from the Lutheran to the Orthodox Church. When religious freedom was proclaimed in 1905, about 12,000 Latvians converted from Orthodoxy to Lutheranism.

During World War I, the property of the Orthodox Church in Latvia was confiscated by occupying German forces, and in the early years of independent Latvia the government was not eager to recognize the church.

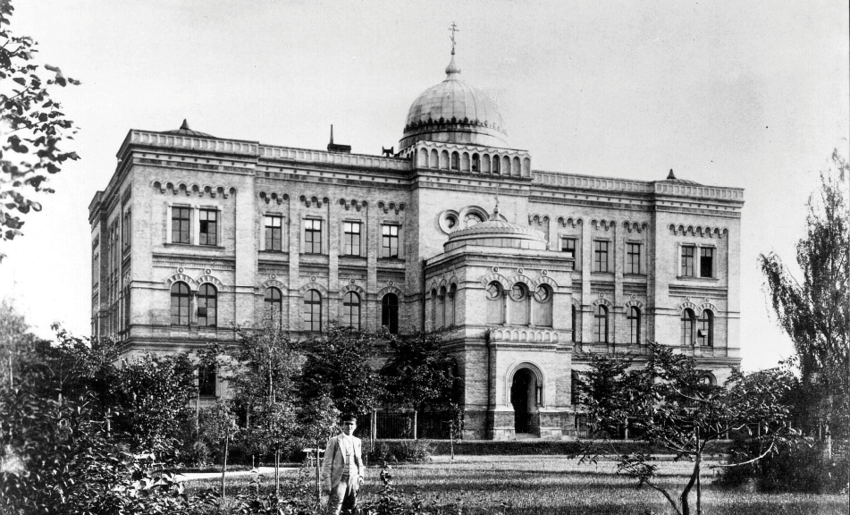
Riga Orthodox Theological Seminary building, nowadays Riga Stradiņš University

=== Autonomy ===
In this difficult situation, Jānis (John) Pommers, a native Latvian and graduate of Riga Orthodox Seminary, was appointed Archbishop of Riga in 1921.

On July 6, 1921, the Russian Orthodox Church granted autonomy (limited self-governance) to the Orthodox Church in Latvia, thus creating the Latvian Orthodox Church (named "Archidiocese of Riga and all Latvia").

Pommers succeeded in winning recognition from the government by 1926 and, against much opposition from leftists and others, in stabilizing the situation of the church. While opposing the Bolsheviks, he maintained the Latvian Orthodox Church within the Moscow Patriarchate. In 1934, he was tortured and then assassinated. His killers never been caught and there are many theories surrounding his death, one that he was killed by Soviet agents. In modern times he was proclaimed by Orthodox church as martyr and saint. Icons of him can be seen in many churches.

=== Joining the Ecumenical Patriarchate ===
After the murder of the church's primate Archbishop John (Pommers) on 21 October 1934 and because of the political situation at that time, the Latvian Orthodox Church asked to come under the jurisdiction of the Ecumenical Patriarchate. In February 1936, the Ecumenical Patriarchate accepted the request of the Latvian Orthodox Church: the Latvian Orthodox Church became an autonomous church under the Ecumenical Patriarchate, and the Ecumenical Patriarchate elevated the LOC from the rank of archdiocese to that of Metropolitanate; the LOC was then named "Metropolitanate of Riga and all Latvia".

=== Soviet occupation period ===
The autonomy of the Latvian Orthodox Church was ended abruptly by the Soviet occupation of Latvia in 1940, which was followed by the German Nazi occupation from 1941 to 1944, and a second Soviet annexation lasting from 1944 to 1991. The church suffered oppression during this period, as did organized religion throughout the Soviet Union, though this was partly mitigated from 1943 to 1948 (due to the support of the Church during World War II) and in the last years of the Soviet Union under Mikhail Gorbachev.

On 24 February 1941, after the Soviet invasion of Latvia, the Russian Orthodox Church turned the territory of the Latvian Orthodox Church into an exarchate of the ROC which comprised the territories of Estonia and Latvia. Metropolitan Augustine of Riga and all Latvia, primate of the LOC, was summoned to Moscow where he was forced, on March 28, 1941, to sign a decree recognizing the situation. On 31 March 1941, the ROC officially abolished the autonomy of the Orthodox church of Latvia.

=== German occupation period ===
During the occupation of Latvia by Germany, Metropolitan Augustine on 20 July 1941 declared the reestablishment of the LOC. However, many parishes did not join Augustine, and the Germans were supporting the Russian exarchate.

=== Second Soviet occupation, exile and deactivation ===
In 1944, after the Soviet re-occupation of Latvia, Metropolitan Augustine and numerous members of the LOC were forced to go in exile in West Germany. There, a Synod in exile was created. The Ecumenical Patriarchate continued to recognize the LOC, even after Augustine's death.

In April 1978, as result of pressures by the Russian Orthodox Church upon the Ecumenical Patriarchate, the latter declared the LOC of the Ecumenical Patriarchate inactive.

=== 1990s and after ===
The church also suffered oppression in the last years of the Soviet Union under Mikhail Gorbachev. In December 1992, the Latvian Orthodox Church was again proclaimed autonomous, preserving canonical ties with the Russian Orthodox Church.

In 2001, a council of the Latvian Orthodox Church canonised Archbishop Jānis in recognition of his martyrdom in 1934. In 2006, the "Order of the holy martyr Jānis" was instituted to reward those who have served the Eastern Orthodox Church and its aims.

In modern Latvia, there are 350,000 Orthodox church members. The services are in Church Slavonic and the members are predominantly Russian speakers. Ethnic Latvians are a minority among church members; there are parishes with services in Latvian in Riga, Ainaži, Kolka, Veclaicene and in other places.

=== Declaration of autocephaly ===
On 9 September 2022, the Latvian parliament adopted amendments to the Law on the Latvian Orthodox Church affirming the full independence of the Latvian Orthodox Church with all its dioceses, parishes, and institutions from any church authority outside Latvia (autocephalous church). By 1 October, the Chancery of the President was required to be notified of the appointment of the Head of the church, metropolitans, archbishops, and bishops, and by 31 October, the Church had to align its statutes with the amendments made to the Law on the status of the church. The decision came a few days after the president of Latvia, Egils Levits, tabled the bill saying that "this bill restores the historical status of the Orthodox Church of Latvia", stressing that the independence of the church established "by the 6(19) July 1921 Tomos issued by Patriarch of Moscow and All Russia Tikhon to Archbishop Jānis (Pommers) and the Cabinet of Ministers Regulation of 8 October 1926 on the Status of the Orthodox Church".

The Latvian Orthodox Church, after the presidential and parliamentary announcements, clarified that:

The state established the status of our Church as autocephalous. The state has determined that the Latvian Orthodox Church is legally independent from any ecclesiastical center located outside of Latvia, maintaining spiritual, prayerful and liturgical communion with all canonical Orthodox churches of the world. The change of status does not change the Orthodox faith, the doctrines, the liturgical life of the Church, the calendar, the sacred liturgical language, the rituals, the traditions and the inner church life.

== Other Orthodox Christian groups in Latvia ==
Besides the independent Orthodox church, Latvia has a number of Old Believer Orthodox Christian communities as well. The priestless congregation of the Grebenstchikov House of Prayer in Riga, affiliated with the Pomorian Old-Orthodox Church, is considered the oldest extant Old Believer congregation in the world. The Latvian Orthodox Autonomous Church, a part of the Russian Orthodox Autonomous Church (True Orthodox), is also present in Latvia.

== See also ==
- Ascension Church, Riga
- The Conversion (Seinfeld)
- Estonian Apostolic Orthodox Church
- Pokrov Cemetery
- Religion in Latvia
