= Valentine Rusantsov =

Russian Orthodox primate

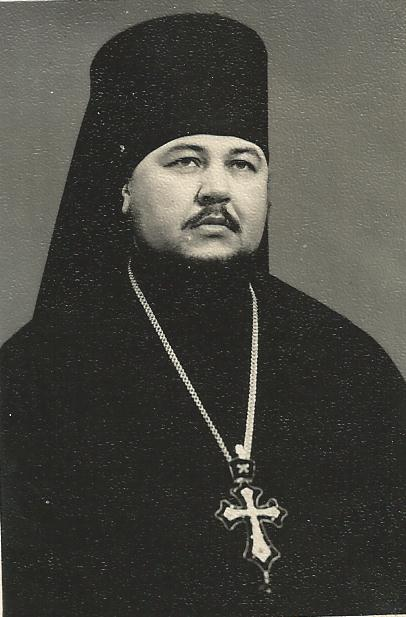
- Native name: Russian: Анатолий Петрович Русанцов
- Church: Russian Orthodox Autonomous Church

Personal details
- Born: Anatoly Petrovich Rusantsov; March 3, 1939 Belorechensk, Krasnodar Krai
- Died: January 16, 2012 (aged 72)

Valentine (secular name Anatoly Petrovich Rusantsov, Russian: Анатолий Петрович Русанцов; March 3, 1939 – January 16, 2012) was metropolitan bishop of Suzdal and Vladimir, and Primate of the Russian Orthodox Autonomous Church.

== Early life ==
Metropolitan Valentin (Rusantsov) was born on March 3, 1939, in the town of Belorechensk, Krasnodar Krai. Since his father had died from war wounds and his mother was seriously ill, the young Anatolii was sent to an orphanage. He was adopted by Yekaterina Buriak, from the city of Maykop, Krasnodar Krai, who was a member of the Russian Orthodox Church in the Catacombs.

In 1952, during a religious pilgrimage in Georgia, the young Anatolii met with monastics who showed him the beauty of Orthodox monasticism. In 1956 he traveled to Holy Dormition Monastery, in the city of Odessa, where he met Archbishop Nestor (Anisimov), a well-known missionary to Kamchatka, and who had served one of the Far Eastern eparchies of the Russian Church Abroad prior to World War II. Together with Archbishop Nestor, Anatolii traveled to the Novosibirsk diocese where he was tonsured reader in the village of Bolshoi Ului, Krasnoyarsk Krai.

== Priesthood and Episcopacy ==
In 1957, Anatolii was sent by Archbishop Nestor to the Monastery of the Holy Spirit in Vilnius. In 1958 he was tonsured by into monasticism, receiving the name Valentin, by archimandrite Seraphim (Smykov), who had been ordained to the priesthood by Metropolitan Anthony (Khrapovitsky). In 1960, he was ordained a priest by Archbishop Anthony (Romanovky) of Stavropol and Baku, who had Patriarch Tikhon of Moscow among his consecrators to the episcopacy. Hieromonk Valentine served throughout the Stavropol and Vladimir dioceses, becoming the rector of the Orthodox Cathedral in Makhachkala (a predominant Muslim area), where he revived Orthodox Christianity, saving the Cathedral from closure.

In 1970, he graduated from the historical faculty of Dagestan University. He completed his theological studies at the Moscow Theological Seminary in 1973 and in 1979 he obtained a Doctor of Theology degree from the Moscow Theological Academy.

In 1973, Archimandrite Valentine was appointed as the rector of the Church of Kazan in the city of Suzdal. In 1977 the Communist authorities forced the community to leave the church building, which was situated on the city's trading square, and move to another, less prominent location, at the Saint Constantine the Great Church, also in the city of Suzdal.

Since 1987 Archimandrite Valentin was persecuted by the Communist authorities and the leaders of the Moscow Patriarchate primarily for his commentaries during a lecture tour in the United States regarding the lack of religious freedom in the USSR.

On April 11, 1990, Archimandrite Valentin and his parish were received into the Russian Orthodox Church Outside Russia, and on October 4 of the same year, he was appointed exarch of the Russian Orthodox Church Outside Russia within the territory of the USSR.

On February 10, 1991, by the decision of the Synod of Bishops of the Russian Church Abroad, Archimandrite Valentin was consecrated bishop of Suzdal and Vladimir in the church of St Job the Much-Suffering in Brussels, Belgium. His consecrators were Archbishop Anthony (Bartoshevich) of Geneva and Western Europe, Archbishop Mark (Arndt) of Berlin and Germany, Bishop Barnabas (Prokofiev) of Cannes and Bishop Gregory (Grabbe) of Washington, all members of the episcopacy of the Russian Orthodox Church Outside Russia.

In 1992-1993 followed a conflict with the Synod of Bishops of ROCOR. In July 1993 he was retired by the Synod.

In March 1994, Bishop Valentine founded the Higher Church Administration of the Russian Orthodox Church.

In June 1995 the Temporary Higher Church Administration (THCA) of the Russian Church was re-established, Archbishop Lazar (Zhurbenko) of Tambov and Odessa becoming its leader. At this time, by synodal decree of the THCA, Bishop Valentine was raised to the rank of Archbishop.

Two years later, in 1996, the Hierarchal Synod of the Russian Orthodox Church was created with the official name of Russian Orthodox Autonomous Church (ROAC).

At the Synod meeting of March 15, 2001, it was decided that the primate of the Russian Orthodox Autonomous Church should have the rank of Metropolitan.

Metropolitan Valentine Rusantsov died on January 16, 2012, in Moscow, Russia.
