= Rudzāti =

Town in Latvia

- Village
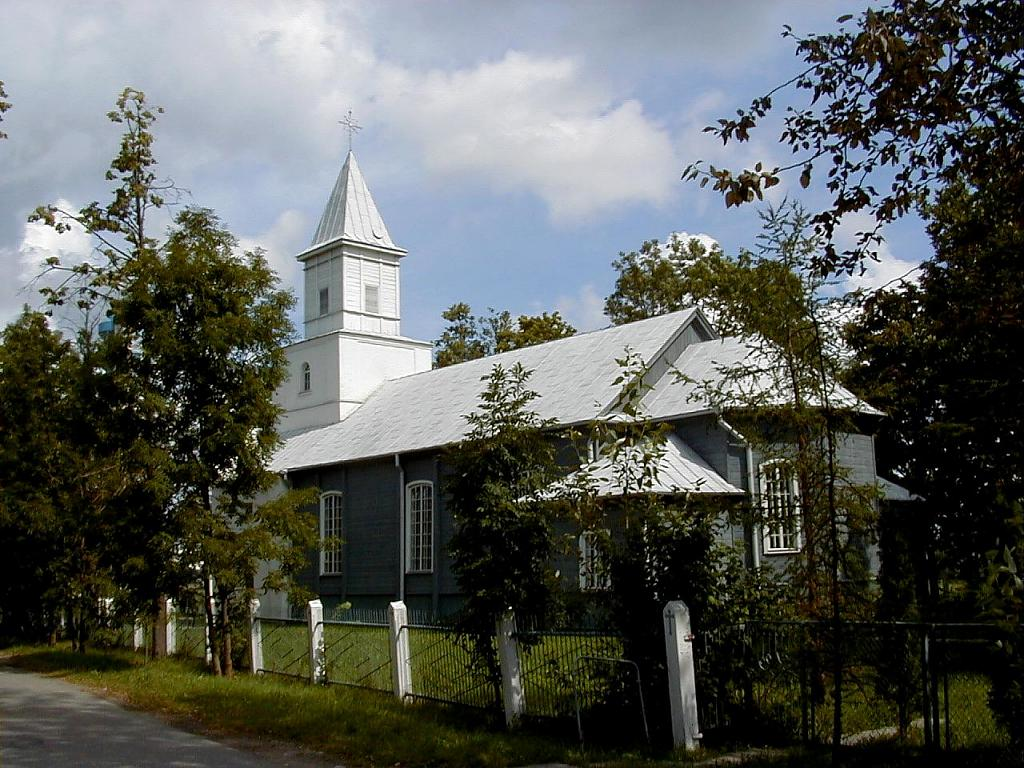
- Saint James the Greater church in Rudzāti

- Location in Latvia
- Coordinates: 56°25′02″N 26°27′10″E
- Country: Latvia
- Municipality: Līvāni Municipality
- Municipality: Rudzāti Parish

Population (2021)
  - Total: 282
- Time zone: UTC+2 (EET)
  - Summer (DST): UTC+3 (EEST)
- Postal code: LV-5328
- Calling code: +371 653

Rudzāti is a village in Līvāni Municipality in the Latgale region of Latvia, the administrative centre of the Rudzāti Parish. It is situated in the southern part of the parish near the P62 road.

== History ==
The ancient village of Rudzāti was located on the left bank of Ūša at the mouth of Sauna. On the opposite bank of the river was the center of the Rudzāti manor belonging to the Plater-Ziberg families, from which a few outbuildings have survived to this day. The earliest Rudzāti village was included in Preiļi Parish, while Rudzātu manor was in Stirnienes Parish.

During the first independence of Latvia, agricultural production was developed in the parish and several strong farms were established (Mazā Zemgale).

During the Soviet era, the kolkhoz "Gaisma" was organized in Rudzāti in 1949, which was later merged with others and transformed into the state farm "Rudzāti".

== Education ==
The first school in Rudzāti was founded in 1905. In 1908, Būmani and Mālkalnas 1st grade elementary schools operated in the parish, and in 1920, Eleonorvile, Steķu-Jaudzemu, Pelši and Rusiņi 1st grade elementary schools also opened. All schools were located in farmers' houses until October 1936, when the newly built Rudzātu six-grade elementary school was opened.

The Rudzāti elementary school building was destroyed in the battles of 1944. In 1948, Rudzātu seven-year school was opened, which with the decision of the government of the Latvian SSR of 18 October 1952 no. 1359 was transformed into a secondary school. The school was located in several buildings in the center of the parish, but on 4 November 1955, the new school in Luzeniekos was opened, and in June 1956, the first graduation of this school took place.

On 1 September 1981, the new building of the Rudzāti High School, built in the center of the parish in Rudzāti, was opened. The school was built by the PMK brigade of the Daugavpils General Construction Trust under the leadership of V. Orupa. Pupils worked a lot in the greening of the school's surroundings under the guidance of teachers, an apple orchard was created.

In 1987, the "Rue Cup" sports tourism competition was held for the first time in Steķu forest. Ten years later, the sils was cut down, after which the sports tourism competition "Oša kaus" began to be held in Rudzāts, where around 40 teams, including Lithuanians, participate.

The students of the school participated in the movement "Mēs tavi saimnieki, zeme!" (We are your owners, the land!), during the summer vacation they helped with work on the Rudzātu Soviet farm and the Oškalns collective farm. In 1990, a competition was organized to test the skills of young mechanics in driving and tractor training.
