= Turki Parish =

Administrative unit in Latvia

- parish of Latvia
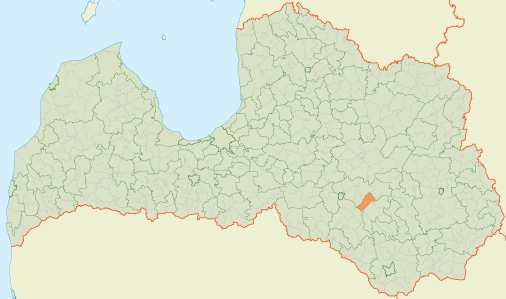
- Coordinates: 56°26′47″N 26°14′18″E
- Country: Latvia

Population (1 January 2026)
  - Total: 646

Turki Parish (Latvian: Turku pagasts) is an administrative unit of Līvāni Municipality in the Latgale region of Latvia.
