= Ves, Vladimir Oblast =

Ves Весь
- Selo
- Location within Vladimir Oblast Location within Russia
- Coordinates: 56°29′N 40°21′E
- Country: Russia
- Region: Vladimir Oblast
- District: Suzdalsky District
- Time zone: UTC+3:00

Ves (Russian: Весь) is a rural locality (a selo) in Seletskoye Rural Settlement, Suzdalsky District, Vladimir Oblast, Russia. The population was 612 as of 2010. There are 7 streets.

== Geography ==
Ves is located on the Irmes River, 11 km northwest of Suzdal (the district's administrative centre) by road. Romanovo is the nearest rural locality.
