= Līvāni Municipality =

Municipality of Latvia

Coordinates: 56°22′N 26°11′E

Līvāni Municipality Līvānu novads
- Municipality
- Flag Coat of arms

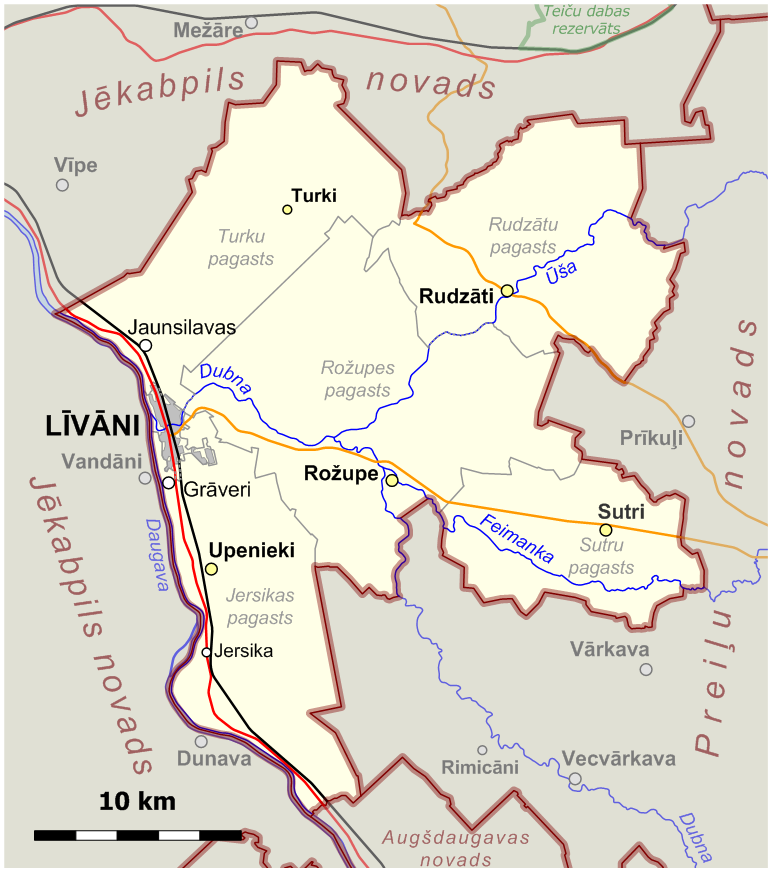
- Country: Latvia
- Formed: 1999
- Centre: Līvāni

Government
  - Council Chair: Dāvids Rubens (JKP)

Area
  - Total: 622.57 km^{2} (240.38 sq mi)
  - Land: 602.40 km^{2} (232.59 sq mi)
  - Water: 20.17 km^{2} (7.79 sq mi)

Population (2026)
  - Total: 9,897
  - Density: 16.43/km^{2} (42.55/sq mi)
- Website: www.livani.lv

Līvāni Municipality (Latvian: Līvānu novads, Latgalian: Leivuona nūvods) is a municipality in Latgale, Latvia. The municipality was formed in 1999 by merging Rožupe Parish, Turki Parish and Līvāni town. In 2009 it absorbed Jersika Parish, Rudzāti Parish and Sutri Parish, the administrative centre being Līvāni.

== Notable people ==
- Jānis Cakuls (1926 – 2022), Roman Catholic prelate, auxiliary bishop of the Roman Catholic Archdiocese of Riga until 1993
- Valdis Muktupāvels (1958 in Līvāni), ethnomusicologist, composer, musician, teacher and doctor of art criticism.
- Ilona Jurševska (born 1970 in Līvāni), politician, Minister of Welfare, 2010 to 2011

=== Sport ===
- Egils Bojārs (born 1968 in Līvāni), bobsledder, competed at the 1998 Winter Olympics
- Gatis Čakšs (born 1995 in Līvāni), javelin thrower, competed at the 2024 Summer Olympics
