= Krapivye =

Krapivye Крапивье
- Selo
- Location within Vladimir Oblast Location within Russia
- Coordinates: 56°24′N 40°20′E
- Country: Russia
- Region: Vladimir Oblast
- District: Suzdalsky District
- Time zone: UTC+3:00

Krapivye (Russian: Крапивье) is a rural locality (a selo) in Seletskoye Rural Settlement, Suzdalsky District, Vladimir Oblast, Russia. The population was 107 as of 2010.

== Geography ==
Krapivye is located on the Kamenka River, 8 km west of Suzdal (the district's administrative centre) by road. Yanyovo is the nearest rural locality.
