= Omutskoye, Vladimir Oblast =

Omutskoye Омутское
- Selo
- Location within Vladimir Oblast Location within Russia
- Coordinates: 56°29′N 40°25′E
- Country: Russia
- Region: Vladimir Oblast
- District: Suzdalsky District
- Time zone: UTC+3:00

Omutskoye (Russian: Омутское) is a rural locality (a selo) in Seletskoye Rural Settlement, Suzdalsky District, Vladimir Oblast, Russia. The population was 289 as of 2010. There are 2 streets.

== Geography ==
Omutskoye is located on the Nerl River, 11 km north of Suzdal (the district's administrative centre) by road. Pantelikha is the nearest rural locality.
