= Sutri Parish =

Parish of Latvia

- parish of Latvia
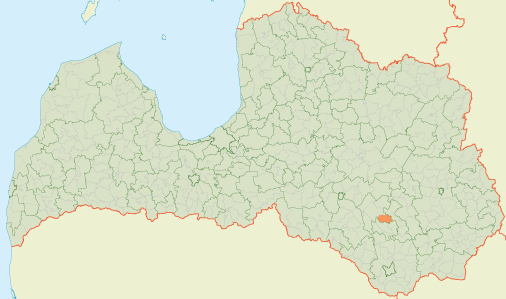
- Coordinates: 56°18′22″N 26°30′08″E
- Country: Latvia

Population (1 January 2026)
  - Total: 411

Sutri Parish (Latvian: Sutru pagasts) is an administrative unit of Līvāni Municipality in the Latgale region of Latvia.

== Towns, villages and settlements of Sutri Parish ==
- Sutri, Latvia - parish administrative center
