= Revelation of Christ Church, Riga =

Church in Riga, Latvia

Revelation of Christ Church
- Church of the Holy Transfiguration
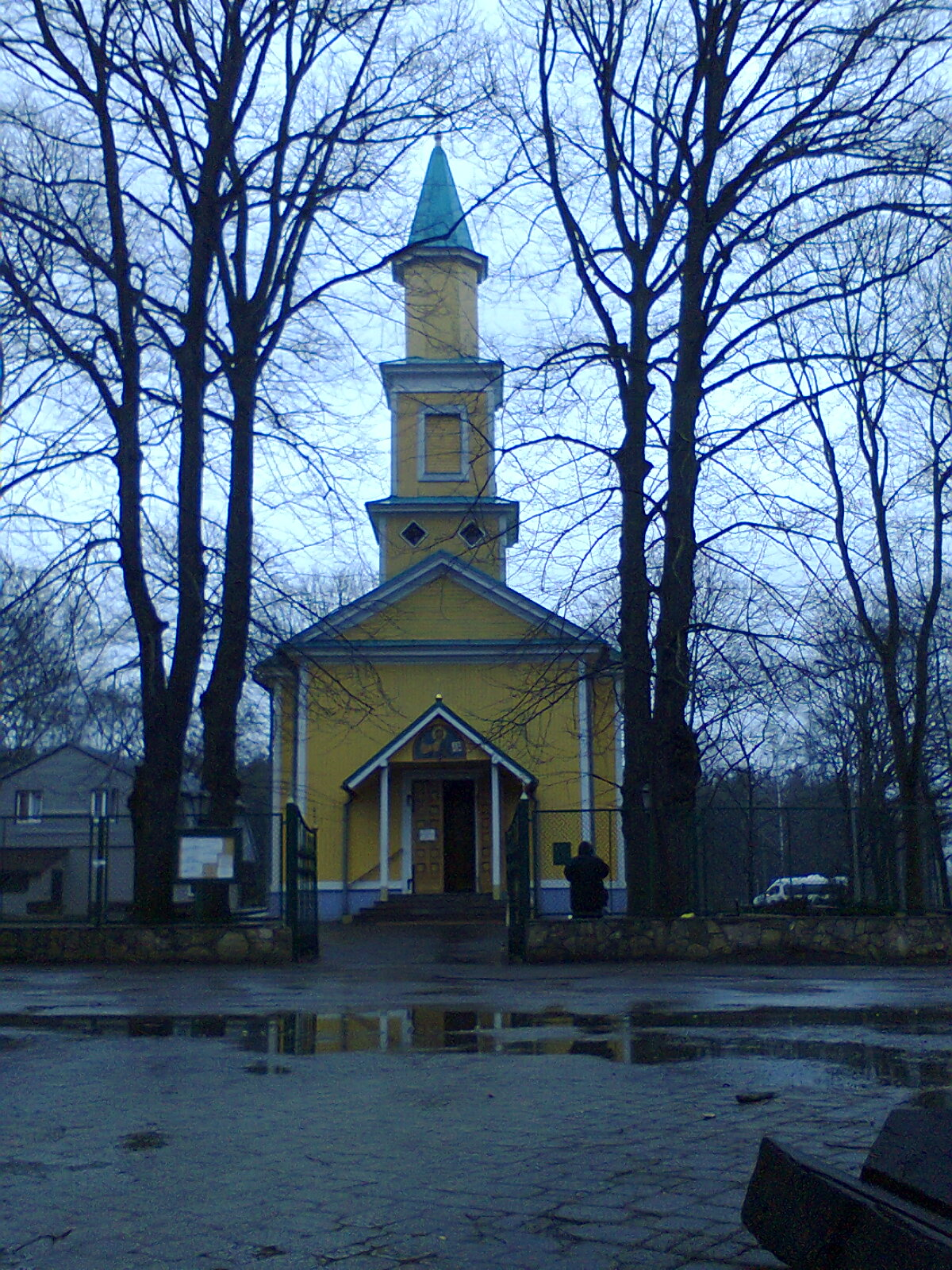

- Location within Latvia
- 56°59′47″N 24°07′59″E
- Location: Meža prospekts 11, Ziemeļu rajons, Rīga, LV-1005,
- Country: Latvia
- Denomination: Eastern Orthodox

Revelation of Christ Church (Latvian: Kristus Apskaidrošanās Pareizticīgā Baznīca, Russian: Храм Преображения Господня, also referred to as Alexander Vysotskaya) is an Eastern Orthodox church in Riga. It is located near the Sarkandaugava railway station. Church was built in 1890 by architect Apoloniuss Aleksandrs Edelsons. The church is situated at the address 11 Meža Prospect.

== History ==
The opening of the parish and the construction of an Orthodox church in this area was extremely necessary, since among the then ten thousand population of the Alexander height and its environs there were up to 1000 souls Orthodox, for whom it was far and difficult to go to the city temple s Of God.

Concerns about the construction of a temple here arose long ago, even during the reign of Bishop Philaret I of Riga, but did not succeed until 1887 when he entered the administration of Riga Diocese Arseniy.

In 1847, correspondence began between the Bishop of Riga Filaret I and the civil authorities about the construction of an Orthodox church and the appointment of a special clergyman for the order of public charity held in a charitable institution at Alexander's height and working in nearby factories. Due to the refusal of the Synod (1848-1850) to release from its own funds the amount for the construction of the church and in the absence of local funds, it was decided in 1852 to turn to private charity. According to the collected books issued until 1854, only 393 rubles were collected. 90 kopecks. Although, at the request of the Riga Diocesan Authority, the city also allocated free of charge a place for the construction of a church near the most pious institution of Alexander's height, and at the same time, on behalf of the Diocesan Authority, a plan and estimate was drawn up for the construction of a wooden church for 300 worshipers, but for lack of funds, the case of the construction of this church remained without movement for more than 20 years, and a pharmacy, a house of a Lutheran pastor and a Lutheran school were built on the once allotted place.

In 1878, Bishop Philaret II again raised the question of the church at Alexander's height. Instead of a built-up place, the Diocesan Administration asked for the allotment of the place where the sealed prayer house was once common for the Orthodox and Lutherans (on the ground of a charitable institution) for church buildings, but the Governor of Livonia refused the request on the grounds that the place where there was a prayer house, as if it was necessary for the construction of other buildings of the institution, and the material of this house is supposedly asked by the Riga Magistrate for "Evangelical-Lutheran decrees." Blessed Donat continued the work of his predecessor. At the suggestion of the Diocesan Administration, the military archpriest I.M.Popov took upon himself the labor of collecting donations for the construction of the Alexander-Vysotskaya church, and within a year he collected up to 1,860 rubles. But this money, together with the money collected in the 50s, was not enough to build a new church, and therefore the business again remained without further progress until 1887.

Having learned at the end of 1887 about the existence of the Alexander Heights and the urgent need for a separate church for it, Arseniy, with his characteristic energy, set to work. At the request and thanks to the intensified efforts of this Archpastor, the Riga City Duma allocated the necessary soil for the construction of a church and school and parish buildings near the Aleksandrovskaya Vysota (Aleksandrovskaya Vysota) Mulgraben railway station (now the Sarkandaugava station), with payment annually in favor of the city for 1 ruble. And after many troubles, by the Highest command, the building of a closed prayer house (which once served both for Orthodox Christians and for Lutherans in religious needs) was handed over for demolition to build a new church. To speed up the construction of the temple, one of the members of the Consistory was entrusted with conducting it with the obligation to personally report to Arseniytwice a month with a verbal report on the progress of the case. The construction of the church under the supervision of the building committee and the Eprachial architect was commissioned for 4042 rubles. Due to the lack of funds for the interior decoration of the church, the construction committee, during the construction of the church, collected voluntary donations, at which 469 rubles were collected. 6 kopecks The shield of the iconostasis and several icons were requested from the Illukst convent, some of the icons (6) and some utensils were obtained from the Ustdvinsk fortress church, and four icons were painted again. “Apparently, the Lord blessed our work,” said Arseniy at the consecration of this temple. “Less than a year has passed since its foundation, but now we have consecrated it.” Vladyka was amazed and spiritually rejoiced at the speedy and successful completion of the case of building a church at Alexander's height with him, thanking God for the success.
