= Jersika Parish =

Administrative unit in Latvia

- parish of Latvia
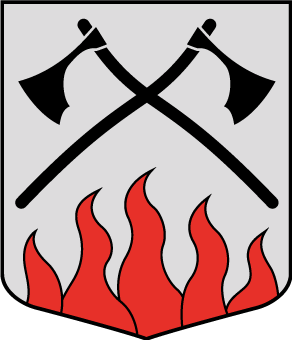
- Coat of arms

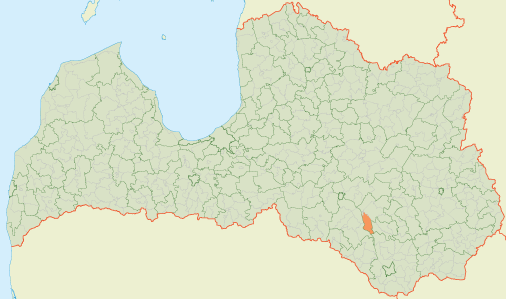
- Coordinates: 56°16′20″N 26°14′41″E
- Country: Latvia

Population (1 January 2026)
  - Total: 596

Jersika Parish (Latvian: Jersikas pagasts) is an administrative unit of Līvāni Municipality in the Latgale region of Latvia.
