= Latvian Orthodox Autonomous Church =

Location
- Country: Latvia
- Headquarters: Daugavpils
- Coordinates: 55°51′59.5″N 26°31′36.4″E

Statistics
- Parishes: 11
- Denomination: True Orthodoxy

Current leadership
- Parent church: Russian Orthodox Autonomous Church
- Archbishop of Daugavpils and Latvia: Viktor Konturozov (1995–2022)

The Latvian Orthodox Autonomous Church (Latvian: Latvijas Pareizticīgā Autonomā Baznīca), or All Holy Orthodox Church of Latvia, is a True Orthodox church in Latvia which is part of the Russian Orthodox Autonomous Church.

Since 2011, the LOAC has declared itself a part of the Patriarchate of Constantinople, commemorating the Ecumenical Patriarch of Constantinople in its liturgies.

The current primate of the LOAC is Archbishop Victor of Daugavpils and Latvia.

== History ==
Since 1994, this church had asked the Latvian State to be recognized as an Eastern Orthodox religious association, because the Latvian law only allows for one institution to be registered for each religious denomination and that the Latvian Orthodox Church is already registered.

As of March 2018, the LOAC had not been recognized by Latvia as an Orthodox religious organization. However, in October 2019, the LOAC managed to be officially registered along with the Latvian Orthodox Church, because the LOAC claimed it (the LOAC) was already registered in 1936.

The church had around 14 parishes as of 2006. The church had around 220 believers in Latvia as of 2015. It was officially registered in 2019.
