= Rudzāti Parish =

Parish of Latvia

- parish of Latvia
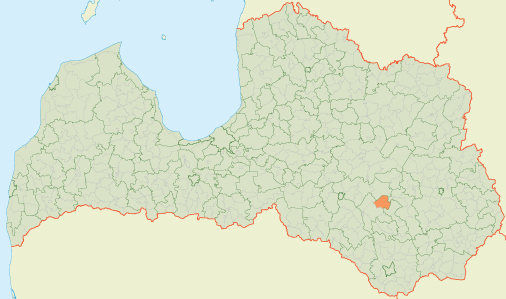
- Coordinates: 56°26′14″N 26°28′43″E
- Country: Latvia

Population (1 January 2026)
  - Total: 617

Rudzāti Parish (Latvian: Rudzātu pagasts) is an administrative unit of Līvāni Municipality in the Latgale region of Latvia. Prior to the 2009 administrative reforms it was part of Preiļi district.

== Towns, villages and settlements of Rudzāti Parish ==
- Rudzāti
